= Cadillac micropolitan area =

Micropolitan Statistical Area in Michigan, United States

- Micropolitan statistical area
- Cadillac, MI Micropolitan Statistical Area
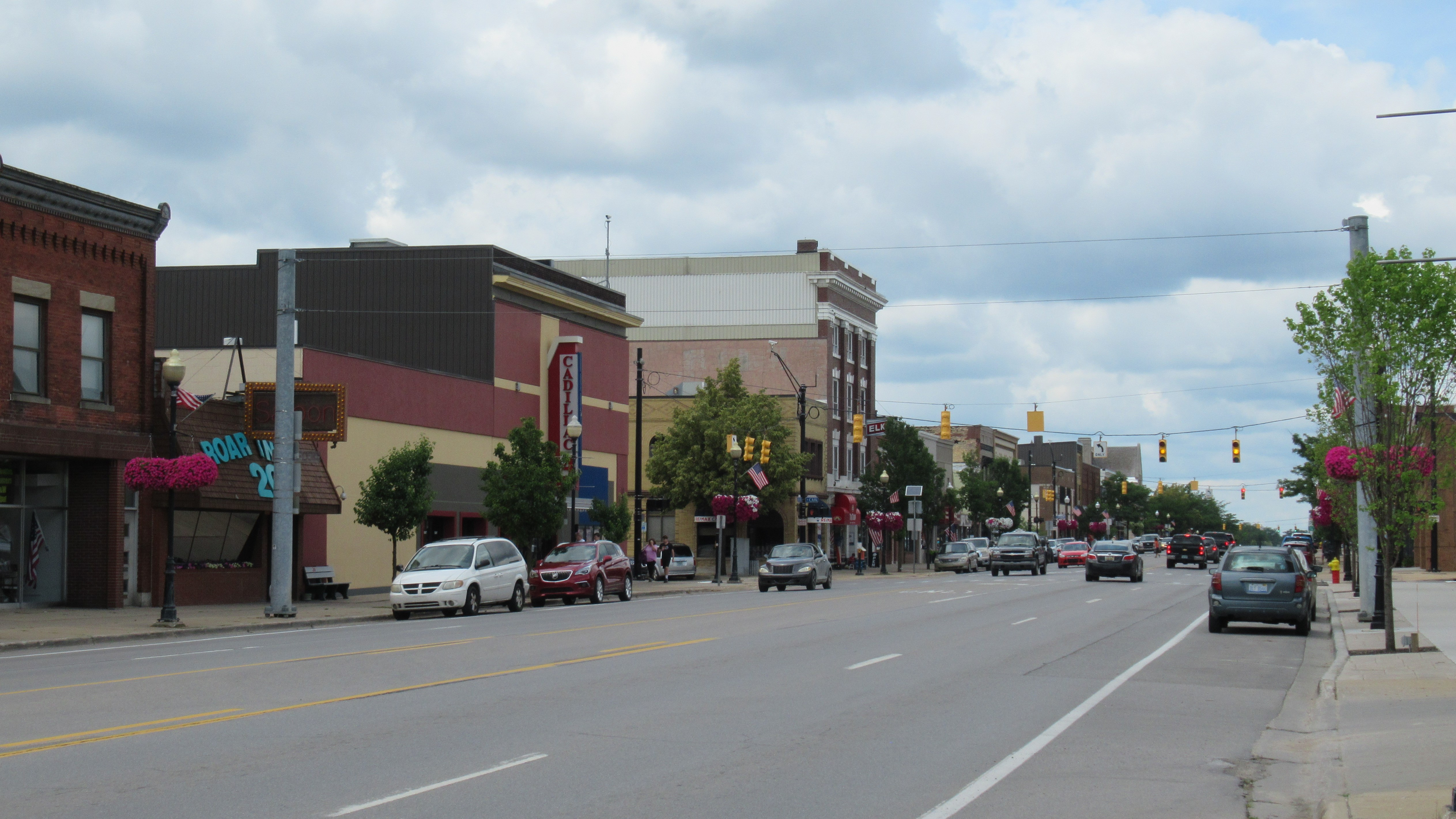
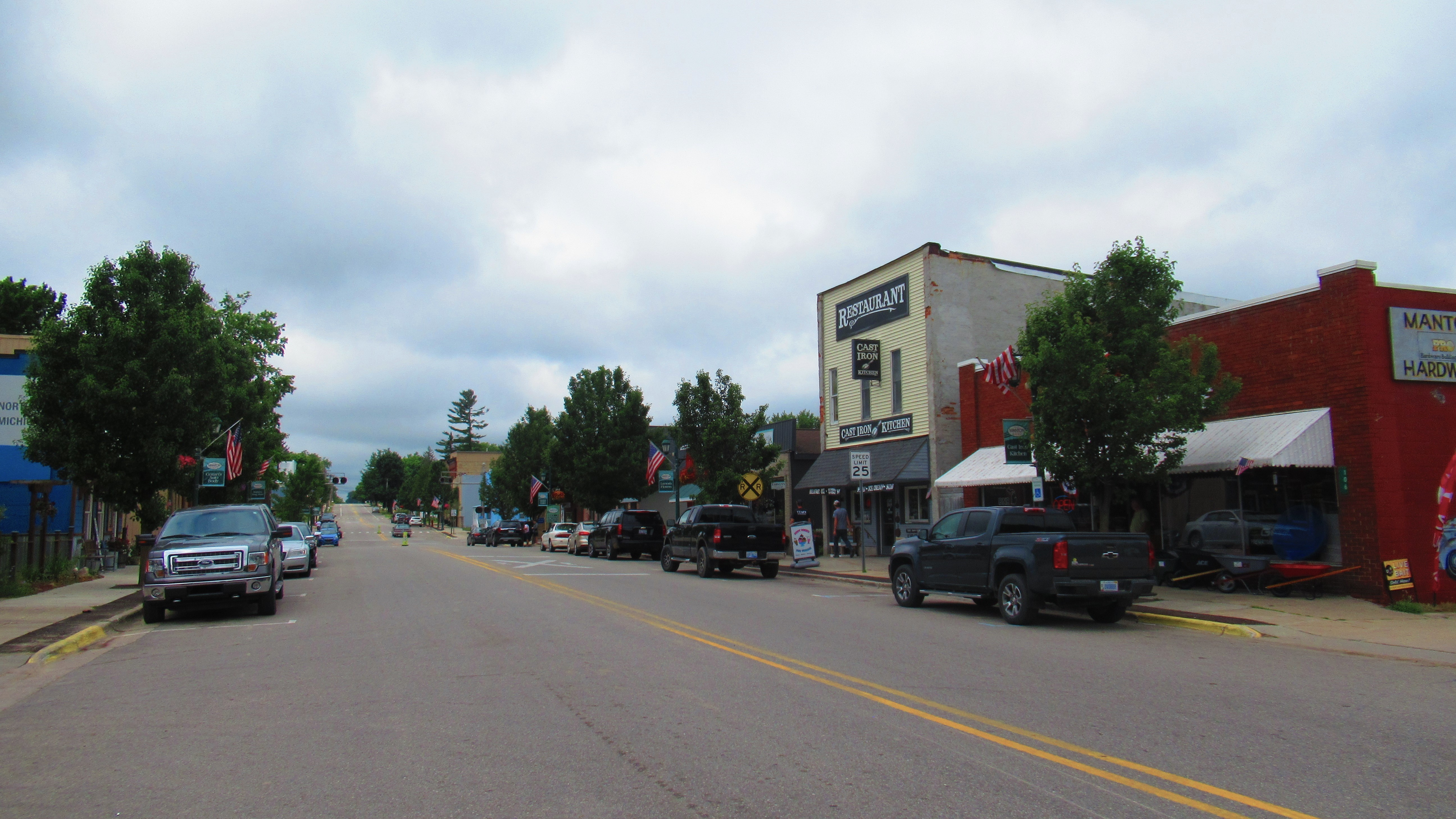
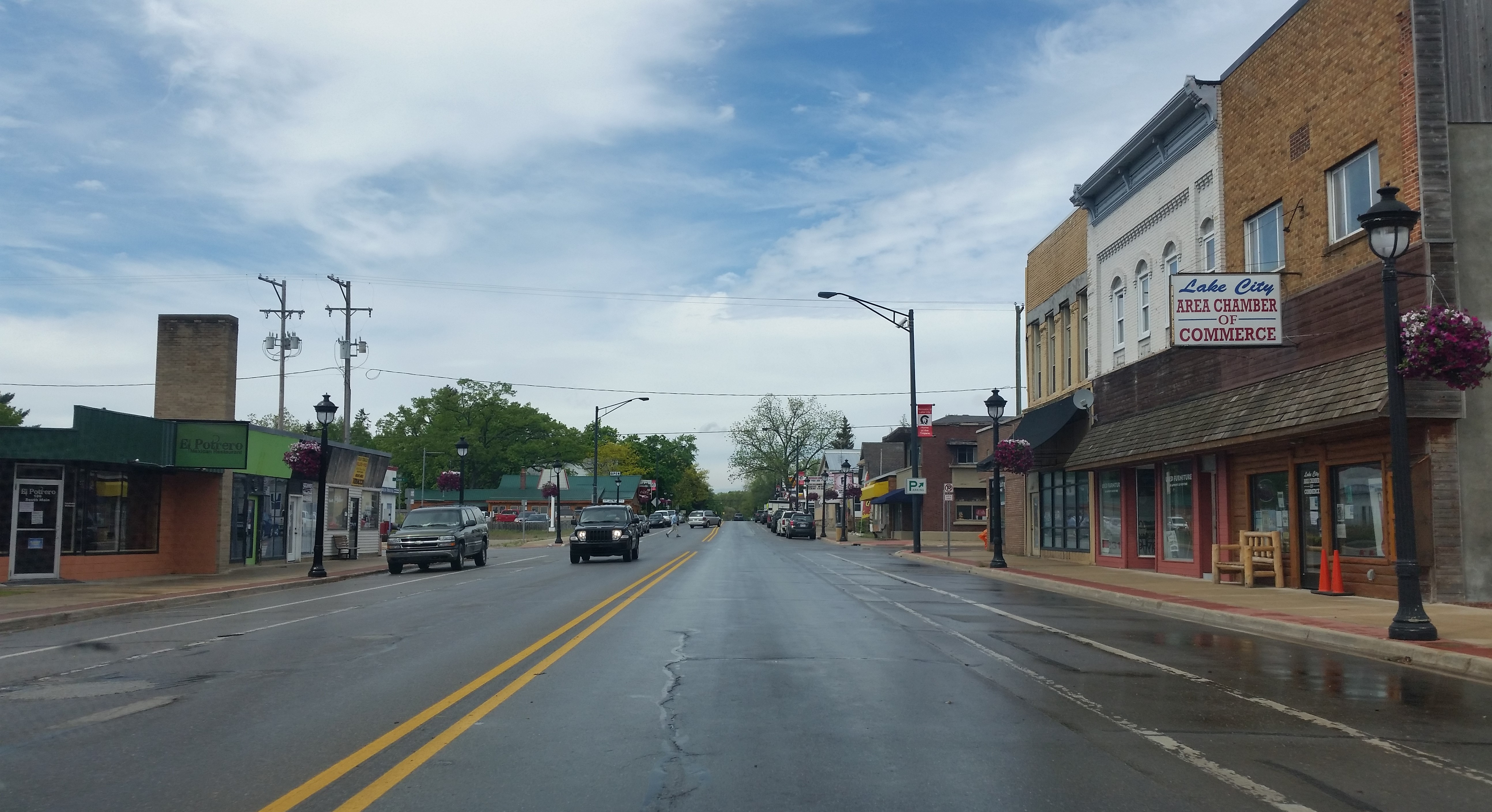
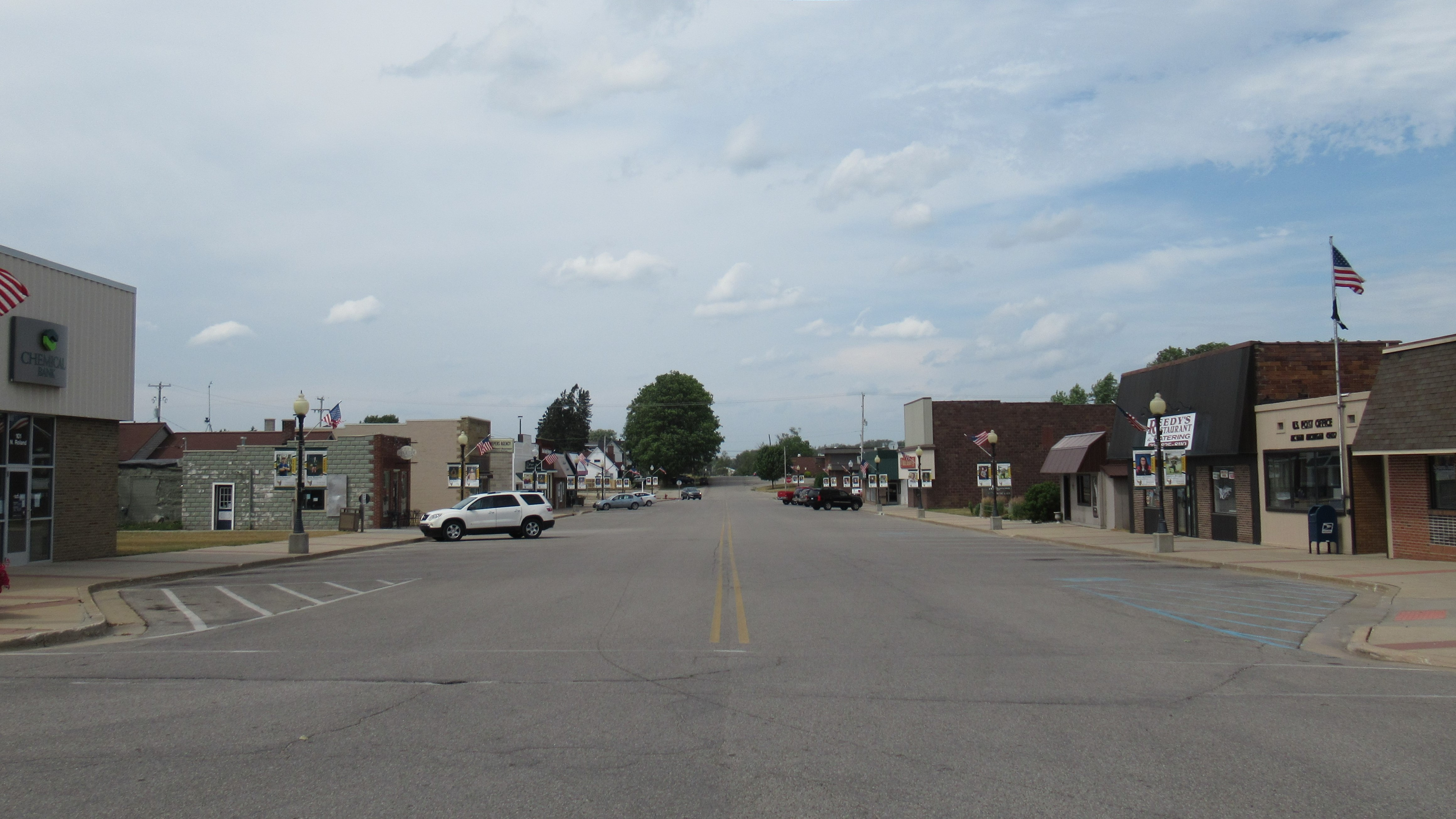
- The city of Cadillac (top) and the other incorporated cities of Manton, Lake City, and McBain
Interactive Map of Cadillac, MI μSA
City of Cadillac
Cadillac, MI μSA
- Coordinates: 44°20′21″N 85°20′20″W
- Country: United States
- State: Michigan
- Counties: Missaukee; Wexford
- Principal city: Cadillac

Area
  - Total: 1,149.46 sq mi (2,977.09 km^{2})
  - Land: 1,129.90 sq mi (2,926.43 km^{2})
  - Water: 19.56 sq mi (50.66 km^{2})

Population (2020)
  - Total: 48,725 (219th)
  - Density: 43.12/sq mi (16.65/km^{2})
- Time zone: UTC−5 (EST)
  - Summer (DST): UTC−4 (EDT)
- Area code: 231

The Cadillac micropolitan area is a micropolitan statistical area (μSA) defined by the United States Census Bureau as an area encompassing two counties (Missaukee and Wexford) in the U.S. state of Michigan. The population of the μSA was 48,725 at the 2020 census (33,673 in Wexford County and 15,052 in Missaukee County).

The principal city of the μSA is Cadillac, which had a population of 10,371 at the 2020 census.

== Counties ==
- Missaukee County
- Wexford County

== Incorporated municipalities ==
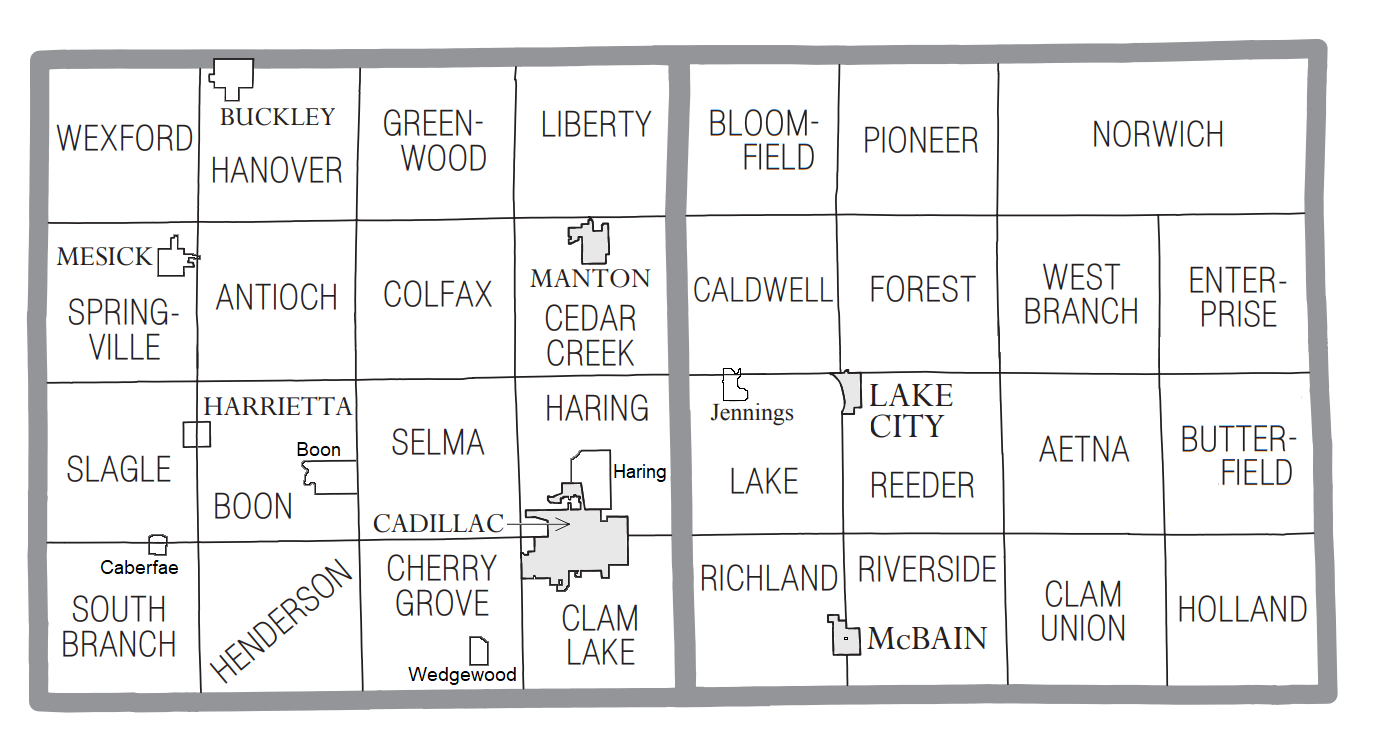
U.S. Census data map showing local municipal boundaries within Wexford County (left) and Missaukee County (right). Shaded areas represent incorporated cities.

=== Cities ===
- Cadillac
- Lake City
- Manton
- McBain

=== Villages ===
- Buckley
- Harrietta
- Mesick

== Townships ==
=== Charter township ===
- Haring Charter Township

=== Civil townships ===
- Aetna Township
- Antioch Township
- Bloomfield Township
- Boon Township
- Butterfield Township
- Caldwell Township
- Cedar Creek Township
- Cherry Grove Township
- Clam Lake Township
- Clam Union Township
- Colfax Township
- Enterprise Township
- Forest Township
- Greenwood Township
- Hanover Township
- Henderson Township
- Holland Township
- Lake Township
- Liberty Township
- Norwich Township
- Pioneer Township
- Reeder Township
- Richland Township
- Riverside Township
- Selma Township
- Slagle Township
- South Branch Township
- Springville Township
- West Branch Township
- Wexford Township

== Unincorporated communities ==
=== Census-designated places ===
- Boon
- Caberfae
- Falmouth
- Haring
- Jennings
- Wedgewood

=== Other unincorporated communities ===
- Arlene
- Axin
- Bagnall
- Baxter
- Benson
- Butterfield
- Cutcheon
- Dinca
- Dolph
- Garletts Corner
- Gilbert
- Glengary
- Harlan
- Hobart
- Hoxeyville
- Keelans Corner
- Lucas
- Meauwataka
- Merritt
- Millersville
- Missaukee Junction
- Moddersville
- Moorestown
- Morey
- Pioneer
- Prosper
- Sherman
- Star City
- Stittsville
- Stoney Corner
- Vogel Center
- Walton
- Wexford Corner
- Yuma

=== Ghost towns ===
- Angola
- Bond's Mill
- Bunyea
- Cherry Grove
- Claggettville
- Coline
- Elton
- Frey
- Haire
- Mystic
- Round Lake
- Soper
- Thorp
- Wexford

== See also ==
- List of census-designated places in Michigan
- List of municipalities in Michigan
- Michigan statistical areas
