= West Branch Township, Missaukee County, Michigan =

West Branch Township, Michigan
- Civil township
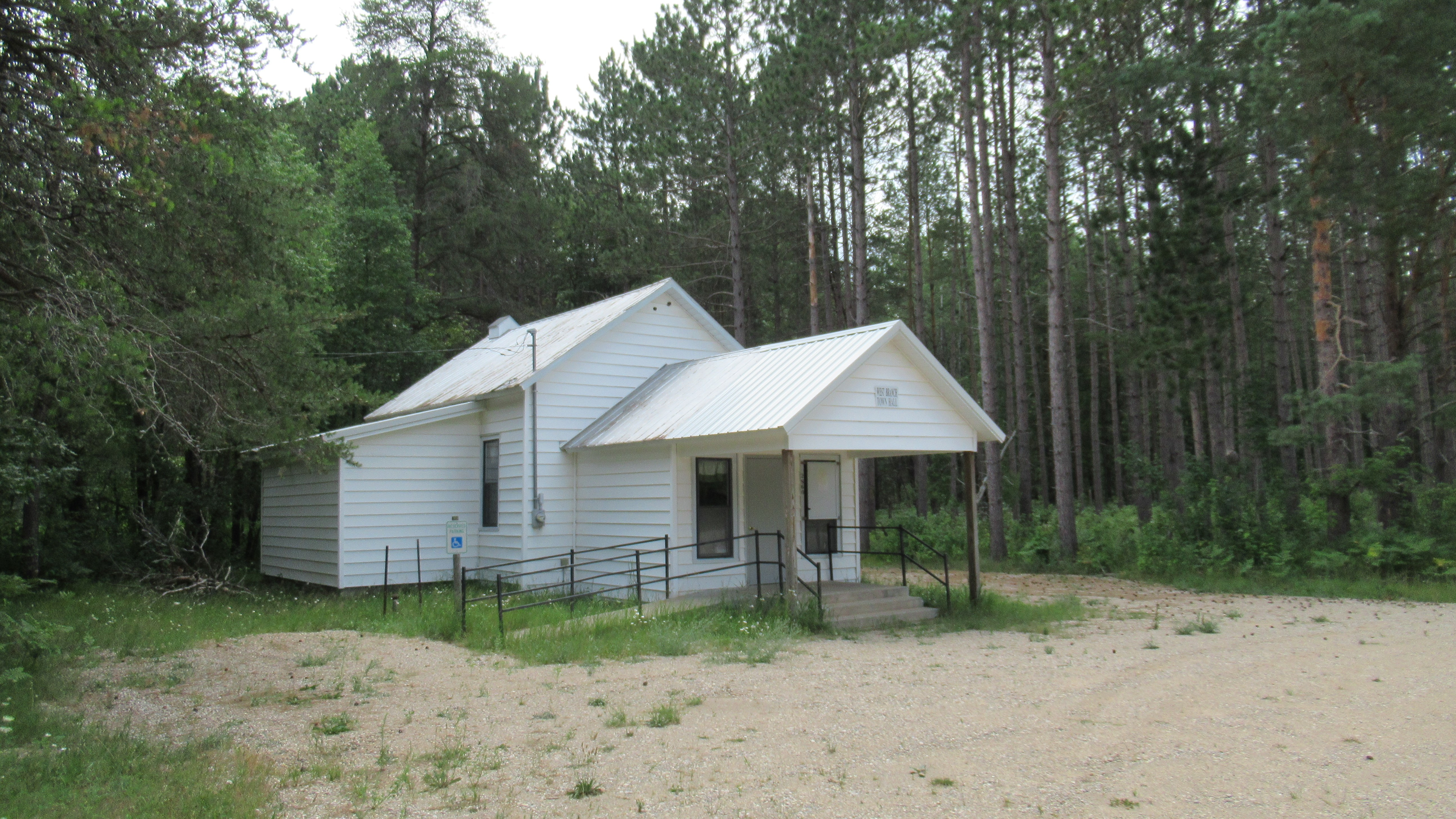
- West Branch Township Hall

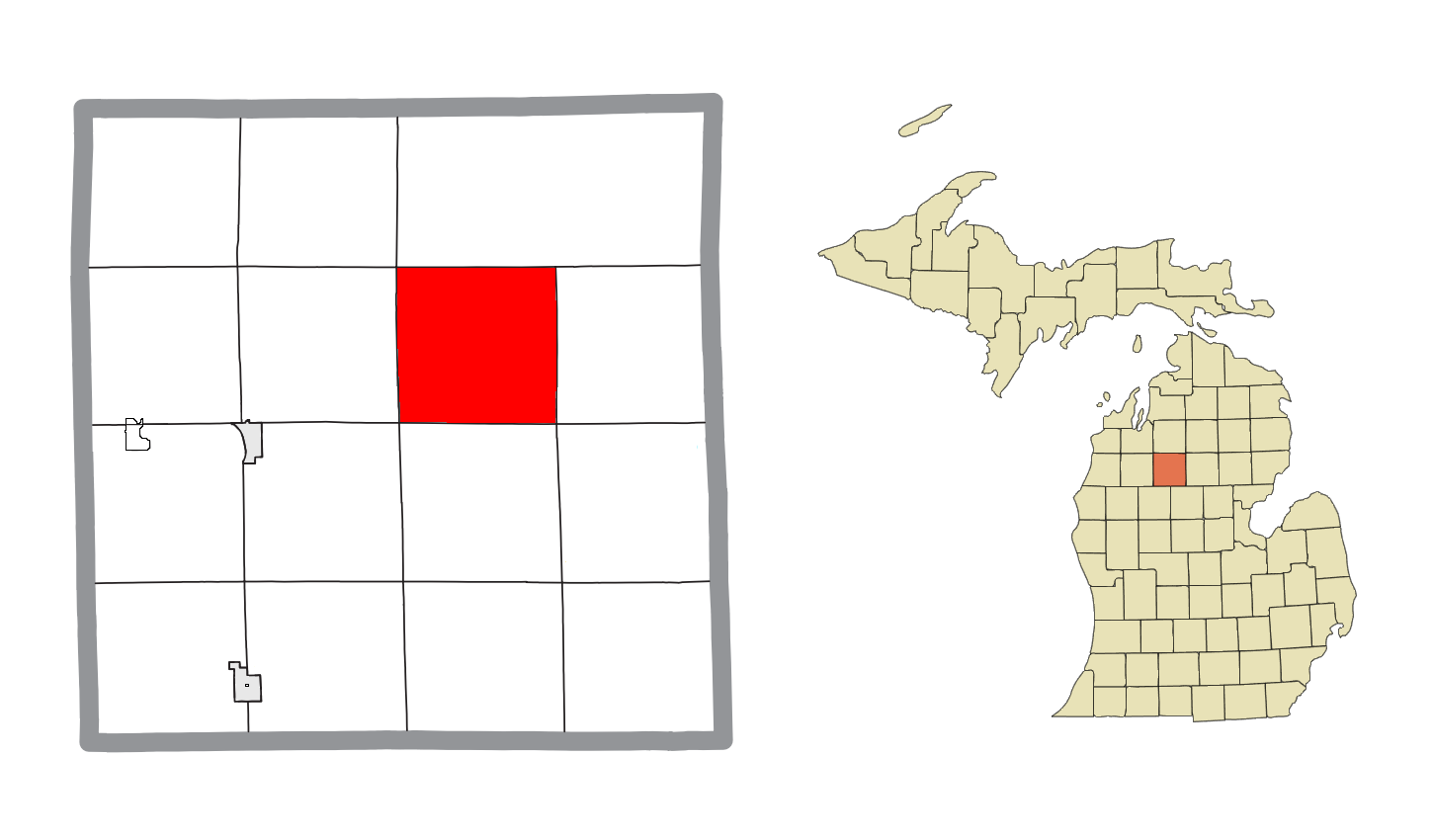
- Location within Missaukee County

- Location within Michigan Location within the United States
- Coordinates: 44°22′46″N 85°02′04″W
- Country: United States
- State: Michigan
- County: Missaukee
- Established: 1880

Government
  - Supervisor: Kevin Travelbee
  - Clerk: Yvonne Ahrens

Area
  - Total: 35.63 sq mi (92.28 km^{2})
  - Land: 35.55 sq mi (92.07 km^{2})
  - Water: 0.081 sq mi (0.21 km^{2})
- Elevation: 1,188 ft (362 m)

Population (2020)
  - Total: 452
  - Density: 12.7/sq mi (4.9/km^{2})
- Time zone: UTC-5 (Eastern (EST))
  - Summer (DST): UTC-4 (EDT)
- ZIP code(s): 49651 (Lake City); 49667 (Merritt)
- Area code: 231
- FIPS code: 26-85560
- GNIS feature ID: 1627247
- Website: Official website

West Branch Township is a civil township of Missaukee County in the U.S. state of Michigan. The population was 452 at the 2020 census.

== Communities ==
- Star City is an unincorporated community in the township at 44°22′16″N 84°59′06″W. The settlement dates from approximately 1872. A post office named "Roy" opened February 27, 1880, with Chauncey Brace as the first postmaster. The name changed to "Putnam" on June 6, 1883, with Elizabeth Putnam as postmaster. The name changed again to "Star City" on February 13, 1885, and was discontinued on December 15, 1923.
- Keelans Corner is a small community in the township at 44°20′16″N 85°04′32″W near the southern boundary with Aetna Township.
- Missaukee 44°21′05″N 85°03′20″W was a rural post office approximately 8 miles (13 km) northeast of Lake City. The post office operated from June 6, 1901, until June 15, 1921.

== Geography ==
The township is in central Missaukee County, with the township center about 12 miles (19 km) northeast of Lake City. According to the U.S. Census Bureau, the township has a total area of 35.63 square miles (92.28 km^{2}), of which 35.55 square miles (92.07 km^{2}) are land and 0.08 square miles (0.21 km^{2}), or 023%, are water. The West Branch of the Muskegon River flows from west to east across the township.

== Demographics ==
Historical population
Census	Pop.	Note	%±
1880	65		—
1890	230		253.8%
1900	315		37.0%
1910	426		35.2%
1920	330		−22.5%
1930	299		−9.4%
1940	318		6.4%
1950	264		−17.0%
1960	218		−17.4%
1970	234		7.3%
1980	371		58.5%
1990	473		27.5%
2000	532		12.5%
2010	466		−12.4%
2020	452		−3.0%
U.S. Decennial Census

As of the census of 2000, there were 532 people, 182 households, and 137 families residing in the township. The population density was 14.9 per square mile (5.8/km^{2}). There were 316 housing units at an average density of 8.9 per square mile (3.4/km^{2}). The racial makeup of the township was 95.86% White, 0.19% African American, 1.13% Native American, 0.56% from other races, and 2.26% from two or more races. Hispanic or Latino of any race were 0.94% of the population.

There were 182 households, out of which 36.8% had children under the age of 18 living with them, 62.1% were married couples living together, 5.5% had a female householder with no husband present, and 24.7% were non-families. 20.9% of all households were made up of individuals, and 8.8% had someone living alone who was 65 years of age or older. The average household size was 2.85 and the average family size was 3.23.

In the township the population was spread out, with 29.3% under the age of 18, 7.3% from 18 to 24, 27.3% from 25 to 44, 22.6% from 45 to 64, and 13.5% who were 65 years of age or older. The median age was 37 years. For every 100 females, there were 100.0 males. For every 100 females age 18 and over, there were 104.3 males.

The median income for a household in the township was $36,161, and the median income for a family was $41,042. Males had a median income of $31,667 versus $21,667 for females. The per capita income for the township was $14,057. About 4.5% of families and 12.0% of the population were below the poverty line, including 7.4% of those under age 18 and 12.3% of those age 65 or over.
