= Reeder Township, Michigan =

- Civil township
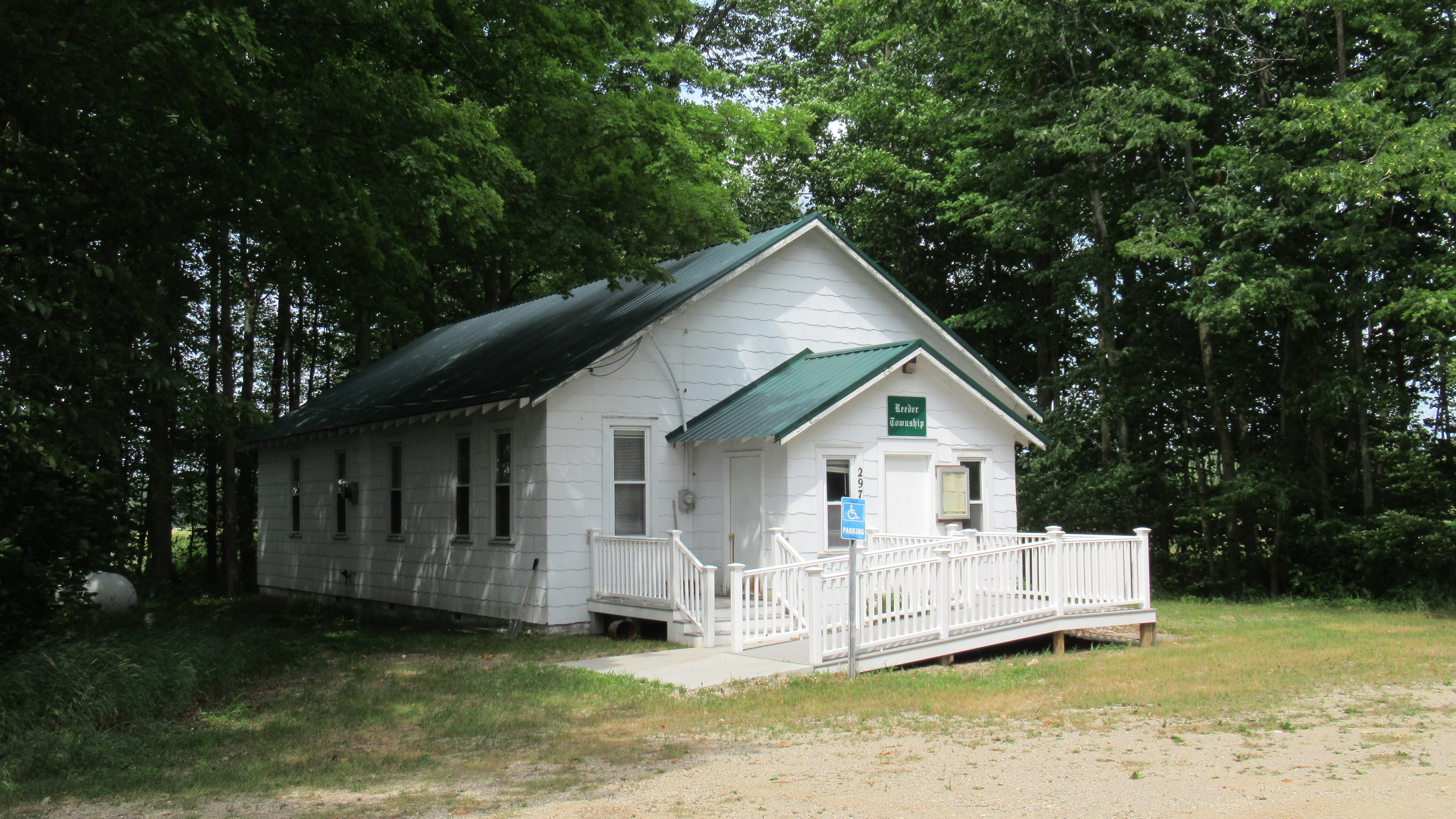
- Reeder Township Hall

- Location within Missaukee County

- Location within the state of Michigan Location within the United States
- Coordinates: 44°17′04″N 85°09′07″W
- Country: United States
- State: Michigan
- County: Missaukee
- Established: 1869

Government
  - Supervisor: Josh Pellow
  - Clerk: Ann Roberts

Area
  - Total: 34.91 sq mi (90.42 km^{2})
  - Land: 34.78 sq mi (90.08 km^{2})
  - Water: 0.13 sq mi (0.34 km^{2})
- Elevation: 1,201 ft (366 m)

Population (2020)
  - Total: 1,199
  - Density: 34.5/sq mi (13.3/km^{2})
- Time zone: UTC-5 (Eastern (EST))
  - Summer (DST): UTC-4 (EDT)
- ZIP code(s): 49651 (Lake City); 49657 (McBain); 49632 (Falmouth)
- Area code: 231
- FIPS code: 26-67840
- GNIS feature ID: 1626962
- Website: Official website

Reeder Township is a civil township of Missaukee County in the U.S. state of Michigan. As of the 2020 census, the township population was 1,199.

== Communities ==
- The city of Lake City, a separate municipality, is situated at the northwest corner of the township along the east shore of Lake Missaukee and incorporates land that had been in sections 6 and 7 of Reeder Township. Lake City was at first known as "Reeder", after Daniel Reeder, who built the first log cabin on what was then known as Lake Muskrat. The Lake City post office, with ZIP code 49651, serves the northern two-thirds of Reeder Township.
- Frey was a post office and a station on the Grand Rapids and Indiana Railroad at 44°18′35″N 85°09′18″W. The post office operated from March 23, 1900, until June 15, 1903.

== Geography ==
According to the United States Census Bureau, the township has a total area of 34.91 square miles (90.42 km^{2}), of which 34.78 square miles (90.08 km^{2}) are land and 0.12 square miles (0.31 km^{2}), or 0.36%, are water. The Clam River, a tributary of the Muskegon River, flows west to east for a small distance across the southern part of the township.

== Highways ==
- M-55 forms the northern boundary of the township.
- M-66, which runs concurrently with M-55, forms the western boundary of the township.

== Demographics ==
Historical population
Census	Pop.	Note	%±
1870	130		—
1880	323		148.5%
1890	832		157.6%
1900	1,439		73.0%
1910	1,335		−7.2%
1920	1,196		−10.4%
1930	1,094		−8.5%
1940	524		−52.1%
1950	519		−1.0%
1960	440		−15.2%
1970	462		5.0%
1980	647		40.0%
1990	772		19.3%
2000	1,112		44.0%
2010	1,128		1.4%
2020	1,199		6.3%
U.S. Decennial Census

As of the 2000 United States census, there were 1,112 people, 394 households, and 321 families residing in the township. The population density was 31.9 inhabitants per square mile (12.3/km^{2}). There were 535 housing units at an average density of 15.3 per square mile (5.9/km^{2}). The racial makeup of the township was 97.03% White, 1.44% Native American, 0.09% Asian, 0.27% from other races, and 1.17% from two or more races. Hispanic or Latino of any race were 1.35% of the population.

There were 394 households, out of which 39.3% had children under the age of 18 living with them, 71.1% were married couples living together, 5.8% had a female householder with no husband present, and 18.5% were non-families. 14.5% of all households were made up of individuals, and 5.3% had someone living alone who was 65 years of age or older. The average household size was 2.82 and the average family size was 3.08.

In the township the population was spread out, with 30.3% under the age of 18, 7.7% from 18 to 24, 28.7% from 25 to 44, 21.4% from 45 to 64, and 11.9% who were 65 years of age or older. The median age was 34 years. For every 100 females, there were 109.4 males. For every 100 females age 18 and over, there were 106.1 males.

The median income for a household in the township was $33,424, and the median income for a family was $35,192. Males had a median income of $30,417 versus $19,583 for females. The per capita income for the township was $13,962. About 7.7% of families and 10.6% of the population were below the poverty line, including 9.3% of those under age 18 and 15.3% of those age 65 or over.
