= List of Michigan metropolitan areas =

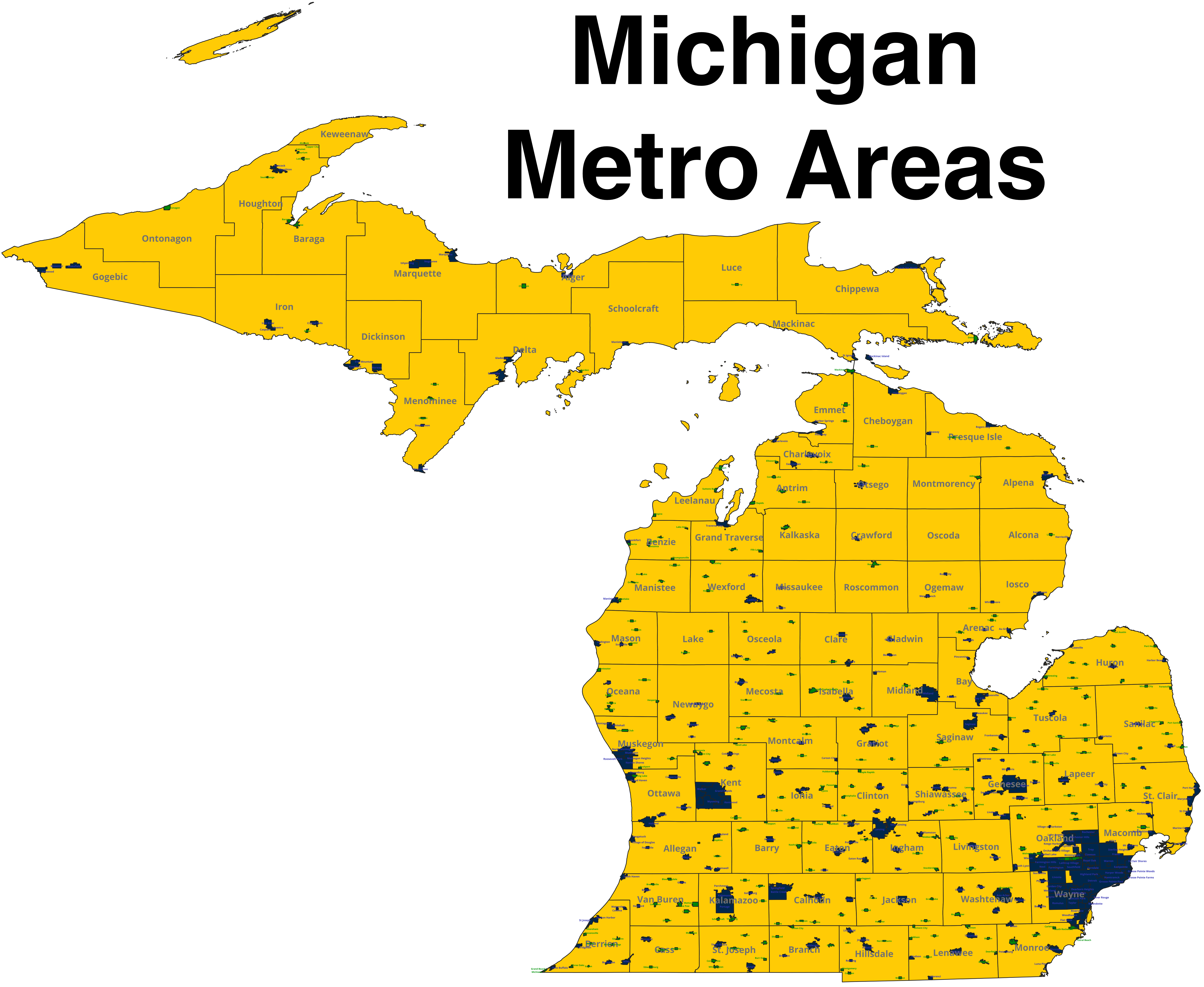
Michigan metro areas

The following is a list of the metropolitan statistical areas in the U.S. state of Michigan, as defined by the U.S. Office of Management and Budget. Shiawassee County was added to the Lansing metropolitan area in 2018; the county is included in the Lansing MSA 2010 population.

== Metropolitan statistical areas ==
Largest metropolitan statistical areas in Michigan
MI rank	U.S. rank	Metropolitan statistical area	Image	2025 estimate	2020 estimate	Change
1	14	Detroit–Warren–Dearborn, MI		4,390,913	4,385,353	+0.13%
2	49	Grand Rapids–Wyoming–Kentwood, MI		1,183,645	1,151,530	+2.79%
3	114	Lansing–East Lansing, MI		479,722	473,347	+1.35%
4	136	Flint, MI		401,093	405,746	−1.15%
5	153	Ann Arbor, MI		370,214	371,814	−0.43%
6	190	Kalamazoo–Portage, MI		263,795	261,780	+0.77%
7	239	Saginaw, MI		187,688	189,853	−1.14%
8	251	Muskegon, MI		177,901	174,783	+1.78%
9	270	Jackson, MI		159,552	160,215	−0.41%
10	275	Traverse City, MI		156,972	153,666	+2.15%
11	281	Monroe, MI		156,004	154,912	+0.70%
12	285	Niles, MI		152,444	154,395	−1.26%
13	308	Battle Creek, MI		133,408	134,198	−0.59%
14	358	Bay City, MI		102,123	103,739	−1.56%
15	376	Midland, MI		83,754	83,488	+0.32%

== See also ==
- Michigan statistical areas
