= Michigan statistical areas =

Coordinates: 44.3467°N 85.4102°W

The U.S. State of Michigan currently has 43 statistical areas that have been delineated by the Office of Management and Budget (OMB). On July 21, 2023, the OMB delineated eight combined statistical areas, 16 metropolitan statistical areas, and 19 micropolitan statistical areas in Michigan. As of 2025, the largest of these was the Detroit–Warren–Ann Arbor, MI CSA, comprising the area surrounding Michigan's largest city, Detroit.

== Statistical areas ==
The Office of Management and Budget (OMB) has designated more than 1,000 statistical areas for the United States and Puerto Rico. These statistical areas are important geographic delineations of population clusters used by the OMB, the United States Census Bureau, planning organizations, and federal, state, and local government entities.

The OMB defines a core-based statistical area (CBSA) as the county or counties (or county-equivalents) surrounding at least one densely-settled core of at least 10,000 population, "plus adjacent counties having a high degree of social and economic integration with the core as measured through commuting ties with the counties containing the core". The OMB further divides a CBSA based on population into a metropolitan statistical area (MSA) for those with at least 50,000 people or a micropolitan statistical area (μSA) for those with 10,000 to 49,999 people.

The OMB defines a combined statistical area (CSA) as two or more adjacent CBSAs where the employment interchange rate (percent commuting from A to B plus percent commuting from B to A) is at least 15%. A primary statistical area (PSA) includes all CSAs and any CBSA that is not a constituent of a combined statistical area.

The 43 United States statistical areas and 83 counties of the State of Michigan (Note: An out-of-state area and its population are displayed in green. An area that extends into more than one state is displayed in purple. A purple population number over a black population number show the total population versus the in-state population. The state's abbreviation is also shown next to the in-state total.)
Combined statistical area	2025 population (est.)	Core-based statistical area	2025 population (est.)	County	2025 population (est.)	Metropolitan division	2025 population (est.)
Detroit–Warren–Ann Arbor, MI CSA	5,416,003	Detroit–Warren–Dearborn, MI MSA	4,390,913	Oakland County, Michigan	1,288,337	Warren–Troy–Farmington Hills, MI MD	2,621,875
Detroit–Warren–Ann Arbor, MI CSA	5,416,003	Detroit–Warren–Dearborn, MI MSA	4,390,913	Macomb County, Michigan	886,221	Warren–Troy–Farmington Hills, MI MD	2,621,875
Detroit–Warren–Ann Arbor, MI CSA	5,416,003	Detroit–Warren–Dearborn, MI MSA	4,390,913	Livingston County, Michigan	197,315	Warren–Troy–Farmington Hills, MI MD	2,621,875
Detroit–Warren–Ann Arbor, MI CSA	5,416,003	Detroit–Warren–Dearborn, MI MSA	4,390,913	St. Clair County, Michigan	160,486	Warren–Troy–Farmington Hills, MI MD	2,621,875
Detroit–Warren–Ann Arbor, MI CSA	5,416,003	Detroit–Warren–Dearborn, MI MSA	4,390,913	Lapeer County, Michigan	89,516	Warren–Troy–Farmington Hills, MI MD	2,621,875
Detroit–Warren–Ann Arbor, MI CSA	5,416,003	Detroit–Warren–Dearborn, MI MSA	4,390,913	Wayne County, Michigan	1,769,038	Detroit–Dearborn–Livonia, MI MD	1,769,038
Detroit–Warren–Ann Arbor, MI CSA	5,416,003	Flint, MI MSA	401,093	Genesee County, Michigan	401,093	none	
Detroit–Warren–Ann Arbor, MI CSA	5,416,003	Ann Arbor, MI MSA	370,214	Washtenaw County, Michigan	370,214	none	
Detroit–Warren–Ann Arbor, MI CSA	5,416,003	Monroe, MI MSA	156,004	Monroe County, Michigan	156,004	none	
Detroit–Warren–Ann Arbor, MI CSA	5,416,003	Adrian, MI μSA	97,779	Lenawee County, Michigan	97,779	none	
Grand Rapids–Wyoming, MI CSA	1,527,054	Grand Rapids–Wyoming–Kentwood, MI MSA	1,183,645	Kent County, Michigan	675,232	none	
Grand Rapids–Wyoming, MI CSA	1,527,054	Grand Rapids–Wyoming–Kentwood, MI MSA	1,183,645	Ottawa County, Michigan	308,459	none	
Grand Rapids–Wyoming, MI CSA	1,527,054	Grand Rapids–Wyoming–Kentwood, MI MSA	1,183,645	Montcalm County, Michigan	69,406	none	
Grand Rapids–Wyoming, MI CSA	1,527,054	Grand Rapids–Wyoming–Kentwood, MI MSA	1,183,645	Ionia County, Michigan	66,557	none	
Grand Rapids–Wyoming, MI CSA	1,527,054	Grand Rapids–Wyoming–Kentwood, MI MSA	1,183,645	Barry County, Michigan	63,991	none	
Grand Rapids–Wyoming, MI CSA	1,527,054	Muskegon–Norton Shores, MI MSA	177,901	Muskegon County, Michigan	177,901	none	
Grand Rapids–Wyoming, MI CSA	1,527,054	Holland, MI μSA	123,188	Allegan County, Michigan	123,188	none	
Grand Rapids–Wyoming, MI CSA	1,527,054	Big Rapids, MI μSA	42,320	Mecosta County, Michigan	42,320	none	
Lansing–East Lansing–Owosso, MI CSA	547,403	Lansing–East Lansing, MI MSA	479,722	Ingham County, Michigan	289,709	none	
Lansing–East Lansing–Owosso, MI CSA	547,403	Lansing–East Lansing, MI MSA	479,722	Eaton County, Michigan	109,581	none	
Lansing–East Lansing–Owosso, MI CSA	547,403	Lansing–East Lansing, MI MSA	479,722	Clinton County, Michigan	80,432	none	
Lansing–East Lansing–Owosso, MI CSA	547,403	Owosso, MI μSA	67,681	Shiawassee County, Michigan	67,681	none	
Kalamazoo–Battle Creek–Portage, MI CSA	458,171	Kalamazoo–Portage, MI MSA	263,795	Kalamazoo County, Michigan	263,795	none	
Kalamazoo–Battle Creek–Portage, MI CSA	458,171	Battle Creek, MI MSA	133,408	Calhoun County, Michigan	133,408	none	
Kalamazoo–Battle Creek–Portage, MI CSA	458,171	Sturgis, MI μSA	60,968	St. Joseph County, Michigan	60,968	none	
Saginaw–Midland–Bay City, MI CSA	373,565	Saginaw, MI MSA	187,688	Saginaw County, Michigan	187,688	none	
Saginaw–Midland–Bay City, MI CSA	373,565	Bay City, MI MSA	102,123	Bay County, Michigan	102,123	none	
Saginaw–Midland–Bay City, MI CSA	373,565	Midland, MI MSA	83,754	Midland County, Michigan	83,754	none	
South Bend–Elkhart–Mishawaka, IN-MI CSA	813,247; 204,121 (MI)	South Bend–Mishawaka, IN-MI MSA	324,538; 51,677 (MI)	St. Joseph County, Indiana	272,861	none	
South Bend–Elkhart–Mishawaka, IN-MI CSA	813,247; 204,121 (MI)	South Bend–Mishawaka, IN-MI MSA	324,538; 51,677 (MI)	Cass County, Michigan	51,677	none	
South Bend–Elkhart–Mishawaka, IN-MI CSA	813,247; 204,121 (MI)	Elkhart–Goshen, IN MSA	208,774	Elkhart County, Indiana	208,774	none	
South Bend–Elkhart–Mishawaka, IN-MI CSA	813,247; 204,121 (MI)	Niles, MI MSA	152,444	Berrien County, Michigan	152,444	none	
South Bend–Elkhart–Mishawaka, IN-MI CSA	813,247; 204,121 (MI)	Warsaw, IN μSA	80,892	Kosciusko County, Indiana	80,892	none	
South Bend–Elkhart–Mishawaka, IN-MI CSA	813,247; 204,121 (MI)	Plymouth, IN μSA	46,599	Marshall County, Indiana	46,599	none	
none		Jackson, MI MSA	159,552	Jackson County, Michigan	159,552	none	
none		Traverse City, MI MSA	156,972	Grand Traverse County, Michigan	96,729	none	
none		Traverse City, MI MSA	156,972	Leelanau County, Michigan	22,982	none	
none		Traverse City, MI MSA	156,972	Kalkaska County, Michigan	18,693	none	
none		Traverse City, MI MSA	156,972	Benzie County, Michigan	18,568	none	
Mount Pleasant–Alma, MI CSA	105,881	Mount Pleasant, MI μSA	64,691	Isabella County, Michigan	64,691	none	
Mount Pleasant–Alma, MI CSA	105,881	Alma, MI μSA	41,190	Gratiot County, Michigan	41,190	none	
none		Marquette, MI μSA	68,064	Marquette County, Michigan	68,064	none	
none		Cadillac, MI μSA	49,719	Wexford County, Michigan	34,445	none	
none		Cadillac, MI μSA	49,719	Missaukee County, Michigan	15,274	none	
Marinette–Iron Mountain, WI-MI CSA	96,090; 48,768 (MI)	Marinette, WI-MI μSA	65,515; 22,941 (MI)	Marinette County, Wisconsin	42,574	none	
Marinette–Iron Mountain, WI-MI CSA	96,090; 48,768 (MI)	Marinette, WI-MI μSA	65,515; 22,941 (MI)	Menominee County, Michigan	22,941	none	
Marinette–Iron Mountain, WI-MI CSA	96,090; 48,768 (MI)	Iron Mountain, MI-WI μSA	30,575; 25,827 (MI)	Dickinson County, Michigan	25,827	none	
Marinette–Iron Mountain, WI-MI CSA	96,090; 48,768 (MI)	Iron Mountain, MI-WI μSA	30,575; 25,827 (MI)	Florence County, Wisconsin	4,748	none	
none		Coldwater, MI μSA	45,993	Branch County, Michigan	45,993	none	
none		Hillsdale, MI μSA	45,738	Hillsdale County, Michigan	45,738	none	
none		Houghton, MI μSA	40,028	Houghton County, Michigan	37,842	none	
none		Houghton, MI μSA	40,028	Keweenaw County, Michigan	2,186	none	
none		Escanaba, MI μSA	36,582	Delta County, Michigan	36,582	none	
none		Sault Ste. Marie, MI μSA	36,081	Chippewa County, Michigan	36,081	none	
none		Petoskey, MI μSA	33,775	Emmet County, Michigan	33,775	none	
none		Ludington, MI μSA	29,040	Mason County, Michigan	29,040	none	
none		Alpena, MI μSA	28,853	Alpena County, Michigan	28,853	none	
none		none		Van Buren County, Michigan	76,071	none	
none		none		Tuscola County, Michigan	52,680	none	
none		none		Newaygo County, Michigan	51,622	none	
none		none		Sanilac County, Michigan	40,083	none	
none		none		Clare County, Michigan	31,543	none	
none		none		Huron County, Michigan	30,530	none	
none		none		Oceana County, Michigan	27,177	none	
none		none		Otsego County, Michigan	26,080	none	
none		none		Gladwin County, Michigan	26,077	none	
none		none		Charlevoix County, Michigan	26,036	none	
none		none		Cheboygan County, Michigan	25,793	none	
none		none		Manistee County, Michigan	25,656	none	
none		none		Iosco County, Michigan	25,266	none	
none		none		Antrim County, Michigan	24,698	none	
none		none		Roscommon County, Michigan	23,914	none	
none		none		Osceola County, Michigan	23,516	none	
none		none		Ogemaw County, Michigan	21,121	none	
none		none		Arenac County, Michigan	15,068	none	
none		none		Gogebic County, Michigan	14,285	none	
none		none		Crawford County, Michigan	13,722	none	
none		none		Lake County, Michigan	13,182	none	
none		none		Presque Isle County, Michigan	13,128	none	
none		none		Iron County, Michigan	11,757	none	
none		none		Mackinac County, Michigan	11,236	none	
none		none		Alcona County, Michigan	10,556	none	
none		none		Montmorency County, Michigan	9,842	none	
none		none		Oscoda County, Michigan	8,723	none	
none		none		Alger County, Michigan	8,641	none	
none		none		Schoolcraft County, Michigan	8,187	none	
none		none		Baraga County, Michigan	8,169	none	
none		none		Luce County, Michigan	6,339	none	
none		none		Ontonagon County, Michigan	5,823	none	
State of Michigan					10,127,884	none	

The 35 core-based statistical areas of the State of Michigan (Note: For CBSAs comprising populations from multiple states, they are listed twice to show both their intrastate population within that CBSA as well as the CBSA's total population. Only the intrastate population is ranked.)
2025 rank	Core-based statistical area	Population				
2025 rank	Core-based statistical area	2025 estimate	Change	2020 Census	Change	2010 Census
1	Detroit–Warren–Dearborn, MI MSA	4,390,913	−0.03%	4,392,041	+2.23%	4,296,250
2	Grand Rapids–Wyoming–Kentwood, MI MSA	1,183,645	+2.92%	1,150,015	+9.23%	1,052,843
3	Lansing–East Lansing, MI MSA	479,722	+1.38%	473,203	+1.98%	464,036
4	Flint, MI MSA	401,093	−1.26%	406,211	−4.60%	425,790
5	Ann Arbor, MI MSA	370,214	−0.55%	372,258	+7.97%	344,791
6	Kalamazoo–Portage, MI MSA	263,795	+0.81%	261,670	+4.53%	250,331
7	Saginaw, MI MSA	187,688	−1.28%	190,124	−5.02%	200,169
8	Muskegon–Norton Shores, MI MSA	177,901	+1.18%	175,824	+2.11%	172,188
9	Jackson, MI MSA	159,552	−0.51%	160,366	+0.07%	160,248
10	Traverse City, MI MSA	156,972	+2.30%	153,448	+7.03%	143,372
11	Monroe, MI MSA	156,004	+0.77%	154,809	+1.83%	152,021
12	Niles, MI MSA	152,444	−1.21%	154,316	−1.59%	156,813
13	Battle Creek, MI MSA	133,408	−0.67%	134,310	−1.35%	136,146
14	Holland, MI μSA	123,188	+2.23%	120,502	+8.16%	111,408
15	Bay City, MI MSA	102,123	−1.67%	103,856	−3.63%	107,771
16	Adrian, MI μSA	97,779	−1.65%	99,423	−0.47%	99,892
17	Midland, MI MSA	83,754	+0.31%	83,494	−0.16%	83,629
18	Owosso, MI μSA	67,681	−0.61%	68,094	−3.62%	70,648
19	Marquette, MI μSA	68,064	+3.10%	66,017	−1.58%	67,077
20	Mount Pleasant, MI μSA	64,691	+0.46%	64,394	−8.42%	70,311
21	Sturgis, MI μSA	60,968	+0.05%	60,939	−0.58%	61,295
22	South Bend–Mishawaka, IN-MI MSA (MI)	51,677	+0.17%	51,589	−1.35%	52,293
23	Cadillac, MI μSA	49,719	+2.04%	48,725	+2.40%	47,584
24	Coldwater, MI μSA	45,993	+2.52%	44,862	−0.85%	45,248
25	Hillsdale, MI μSA	45,738	−0.02%	45,746	−2.02%	46,688
26	Big Rapids, MI μSA	42,320	+6.56%	39,714	−7.21%	42,798
27	Alma, MI μSA	41,190	−1.37%	41,761	−1.68%	42,476
28	Houghton, MI μSA	40,028	+1.58%	39,407	+1.61%	38,784
29	Escanaba, MI μSA	36,582	−0.87%	36,903	−0.45%	37,069
30	Sault Ste. Marie, MI μSA	36,081	−1.91%	36,785	−4.50%	38,520
31	Petoskey, MI μSA	33,775	−0.99%	34,112	+4.34%	32,694
32	Ludington, MI μSA	29,040	−0.04%	29,052	+1.21%	28,705
33	Alpena, MI μSA	28,853	−0.19%	28,907	−2.33%	29,598
34	Iron Mountain, MI-WI μSA (MI)	25,827	−0.46%	25,947	−0.84%	26,168
35	Marinette, WI-MI μSA (MI)	22,941	−2.39%	23,502	−2.19%	24,029
	Iron Mountain, MI-WI μSA	30,575	+0.23%	30,505	−0.28%	30,591
	Marinette, WI-MI μSA	65,515	+0.22%	65,374	−0.61%	65,778
	South Bend–Mishawaka, IN-MI MSA	324,538	+0.01%	324,501	+1.65%	319,224

The eight combined statistical areas of the State of Michigan (Note: For CSAs comprising populations from multiple states, they are listed twice to show both their intrastate population within that CSA as well as the CSA's total population. Only the intrastate population is ranked.)
2025 rank	Combined statistical area	Population				
2025 rank	Combined statistical area	2025 estimate	Change	2020 Census	Change	2010 Census
1	Detroit–Warren–Ann Arbor, MI CSA	5,416,003	−0.16%	5,424,742	+1.99%	5,318,744
2	Grand Rapids–Wyoming, MI CSA	1,527,054	+2.76%	1,486,055	+7.74%	1,379,237
3	Lansing–East Lansing–Owosso, MI CSA	547,403	+1.13%	541,297	+1.24%	534,684
4	Kalamazoo–Battle Creek–Portage, MI CSA	458,171	+0.27%	456,919	+2.04%	447,772
5	Saginaw–Midland–Bay City, MI CSA	373,565	−1.04%	377,474	−3.60%	391,569
6	South Bend–Elkhart–Mishawaka, IN-MI CSA (MI)	204,121	−0.87%	205,905	−1.53%	209,106
7	Mount Pleasant–Alma, MI CSA	105,881	−0.26%	106,155	−5.88%	112,787
8	Marinette–Iron Mountain, WI-MI CSA (MI)	48,768	−1.38%	49,449	−1.49%	50,197
	Marinette–Iron Mountain, WI-MI CSA	96,090	+0.22%	95,879	−0.51%	96,369
	South Bend–Elkhart–Mishawaka, IN-MI CSA	813,247	+0.13%	812,199	+1.78%	798,005

== See also ==
- Geography of Michigan
  - Demographics of Michigan
