= Clam Union Township, Michigan =

- Civil township
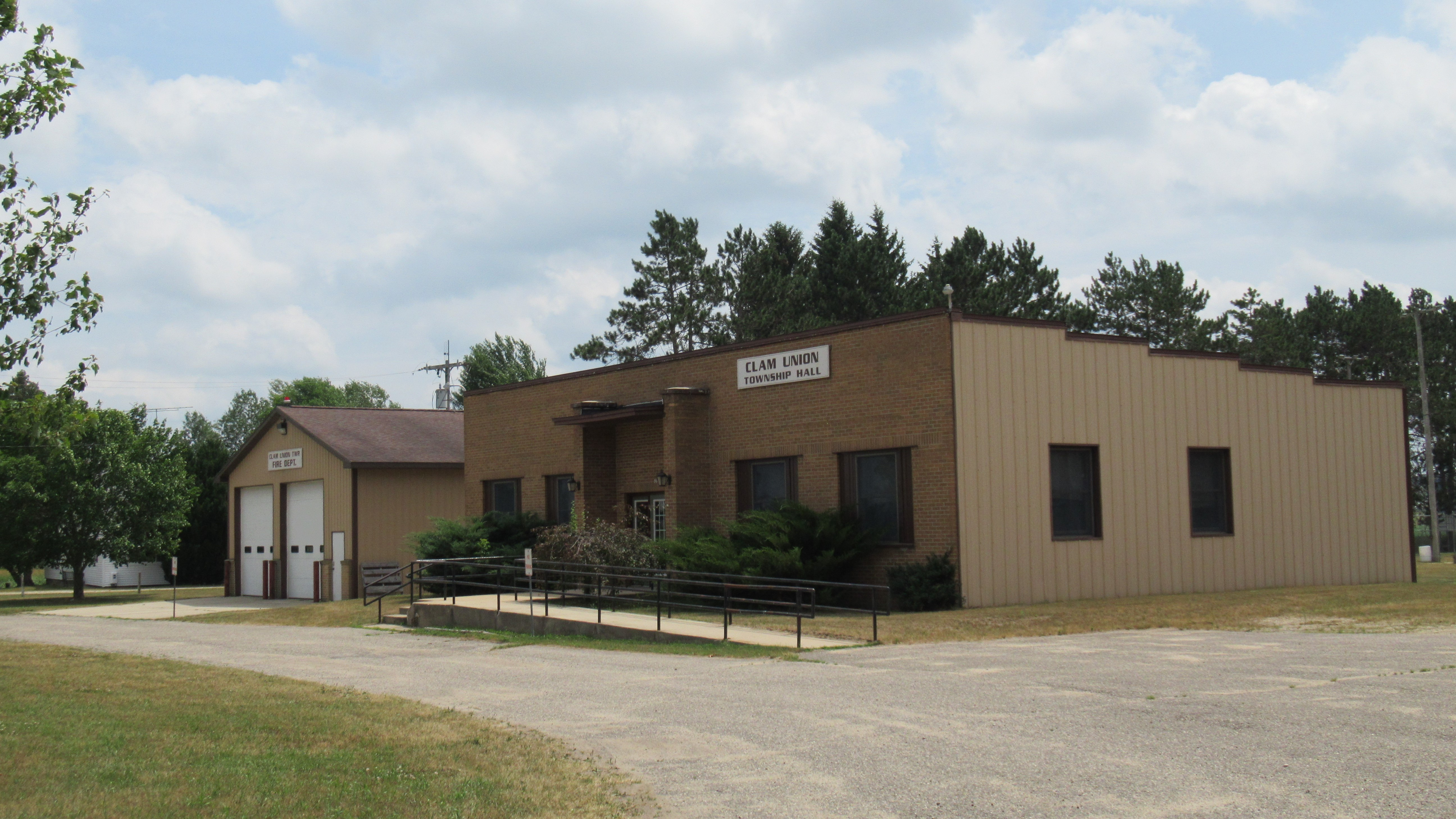
- Clam Union Township Hall and Fire Department

- Location within Missaukee County (red) and the administered CDP of Falmouth (pink)

- Location within the state of Michigan Location within the United States
- Coordinates: 44°12′23″N 85°01′54″W
- Country: United States
- State: Michigan
- County: Missaukee
- Established: 1871

Government
  - Supervisor: Mark DeZeeuw
  - Clerk: Steven Ebels

Area
  - Total: 36.00 sq mi (93.24 km^{2})
  - Land: 35.59 sq mi (92.18 km^{2})
  - Water: 0.41 sq mi (1.06 km^{2})
- Elevation: 1,142 ft (348 m)

Population (2020)
  - Total: 907
  - Density: 25.5/sq mi (9.8/km^{2})
- Time zone: UTC-5 (Eastern (EST))
  - Summer (DST): UTC-4 (EDT)
- ZIP code(s): 49632 (Falmouth); 49657 (McBain); 49665 (Marion)
- Area code: 231
- FIPS code: 26-15900
- GNIS feature ID: 1626084
- Website: Official website

Clam Union Township is a civil township of Missaukee County in the U.S. state of Michigan. The population was 907 at the 2020 census.

== Communities ==
- Falmouth is an unincorporated community and census-designated place in the northwest part of the township at 44°14′36″N 85°05′13″W
- Prosper is an unincorporated community in the northern part of the township at 44°14′34″N 85°01′59″W A post office operated from July 5, 1901, until May 31, 1914.
- Vogel Center, or Centre, is an unincorporated community in the township at 44°11′33″N 85°03′09″W It was named for John Vogel, the first settler in the township. A post office opened in his store on February 25, 1879, with Arie de Jong as the first postmaster. The office was discontinued on May 31, 1914.

== Geography ==
According to the U.S. Census Bureau, the township has a total area of 36.00 square miles (93.24 km^{2}), of which 35.59 square miles (92.18 km^{2}) are land and 0.41 square miles (1.1 km^{2}), or 1.15%, are water.

The Clam River, a tributary of the Muskegon River, flows northwest to southeast across the township. The Clam River Dam is in the northwest corner of the township at Falmouth.

== Demographics ==
Historical population
Census	Pop.	Note	%±
1880	402		—
1890	678		68.7%
1900	987		45.6%
1910	1,381		39.9%
1920	882		−36.1%
1930	801		−9.2%
1940	846		5.6%
1950	750		−11.3%
1960	632		−15.7%
1970	679		7.4%
1980	797		17.4%
1990	854		7.2%
2000	882		3.3%
2010	882		0.0%
2020	907		2.8%
U.S. Decennial Census

As of the census of 2000, there were 882 people, 311 households, and 238 families residing in the township. The population density was 24.6 inhabitants per square mile (9.5/km^{2}). There were 473 housing units at an average density of 13.2 per square mile (5.1/km^{2}). The racial makeup of the township was 98.53% White, 0.23% Native American, 0.11% Asian, 0.68% from other races, and 0.45% from two or more races. Hispanic or Latino of any race were 1.25% of the population.

There were 311 households, out of which 40.5% had children under the age of 18 living with them, 68.8% were married couples living together, 5.1% had a female householder with no husband present, and 23.2% were non-families. 21.2% of all households were made up of individuals, and 10.0% had someone living alone who was 65 years of age or older. The average household size was 2.84 and the average family size was 3.29.

In the township the population was spread out, with 33.2% under the age of 18, 8.8% from 18 to 24, 26.4% from 25 to 44, 18.4% from 45 to 64, and 13.2% who were 65 years of age or older. The median age was 33 years. For every 100 females, there were 95.6 males. For every 100 females age 18 and over, there were 96.3 males.

The median income for a household in the township was $35,542, and the median income for a family was $36,793. Males had a median income of $30,078 versus $20,547 for females. The per capita income for the township was $13,542. About 7.7% of families and 10.4% of the population were below the poverty line, including 14.2% of those under age 18 and 6.1% of those age 65 or over.
