= Riverside Township, Michigan =

- Civil township
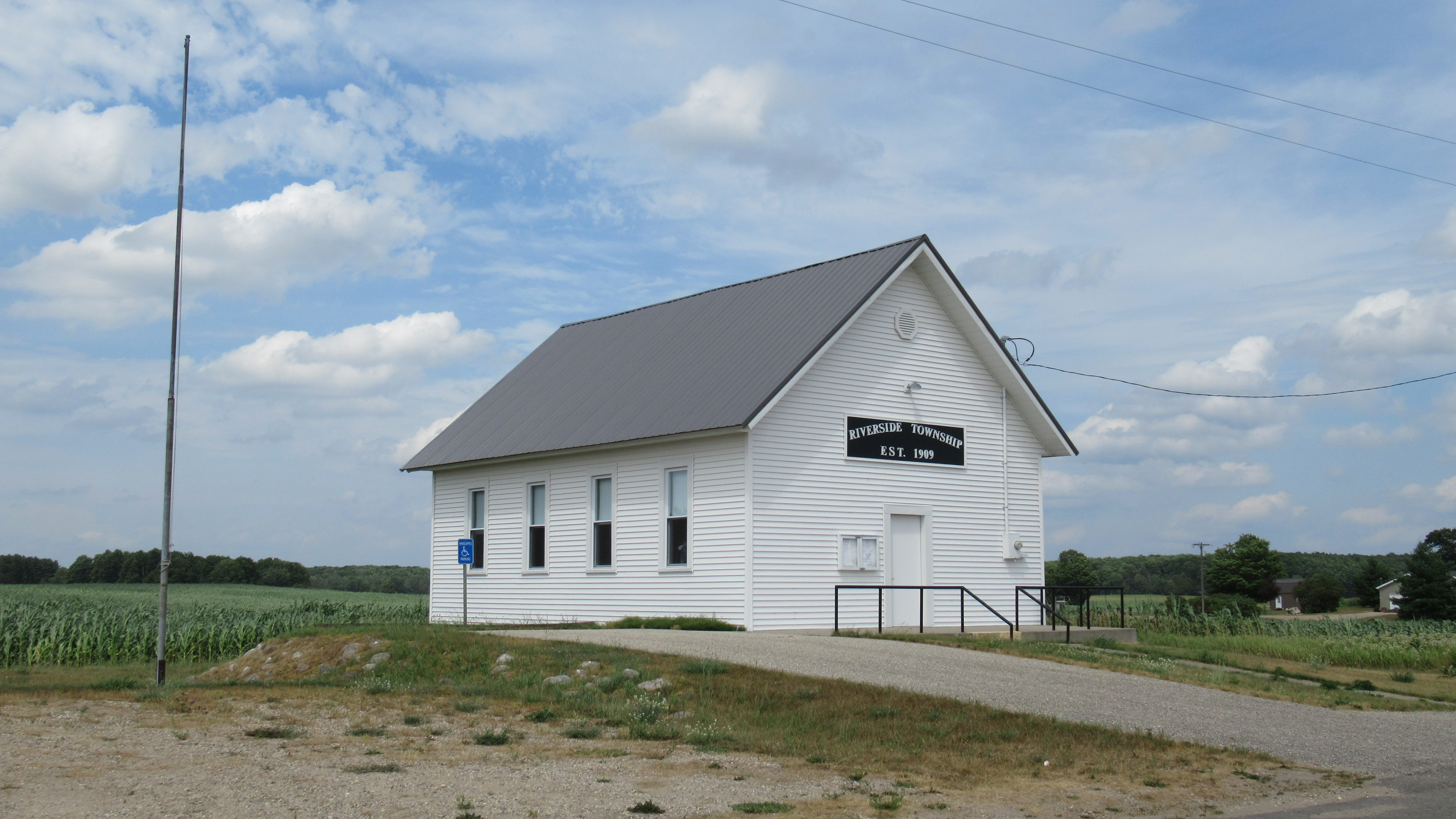
- Riverside Township Hall

- Location within Missaukee County

- Location within the state of Michigan Location within the United States
- Coordinates: 44°12′31″N 85°09′16″W
- Country: United States
- State: Michigan
- County: Missaukee
- Established: 1871

Government
  - Supervisor: David Rozeveld
  - Clerk: Jill Geeseman

Area
  - Total: 35.55 sq mi (92.07 km^{2})
  - Land: 35.35 sq mi (91.56 km^{2})
  - Water: 0.20 sq mi (0.52 km^{2})
- Elevation: 1,220 ft (372 m)

Population (2020)
  - Total: 1,124
  - Density: 31.8/sq mi (12.3/km^{2})
- Time zone: UTC-5 (Eastern (EST))
  - Summer (DST): UTC-4 (EDT)
- ZIP code(s): 49657 (McBain); 49632 (Falmouth); 49665 (Marion)
- Area code: 231
- FIPS code: 26-68820
- GNIS feature ID: 1626984
- Website: Official website

Riverside Township is a civil township of Missaukee County in the U.S. state of Michigan. The population was 1,124 at the 2020 census.

== Communities ==
- Forward was the name of a rural post office in the eastern part of Riverside Township at 44°18′35″N 85°09′18″W at the junction of Forward Road and Meyering Road and operated from October 10, 1903, until January 15, 1908. Joseph Nederhoed was the first postmaster.
- Galt was the name of a post office and settlement in the township. William McBain was the first postmaster when the office was established on June 23, 1874. The office closed on January 20, 1879, re-opened on March 28, 1879, and was discontinued on September 15, 1908. Locally it was known as "Galt Farms."

== Geography ==
Riverside Township is in southern Missaukee County, bordered to the south by Osceola County. According to the U.S. Census Bureau, the township has a total area of 35.55 square miles (92.1 km^{2}), of which 35.35 square miles (91.6 km^{2}) are land and 0.20 square miles (0.52 km^{2}), or 0.57%, are water. The Clam River flows west to east across the northern part of the township.

== Highway ==
- M-66 runs through the southwest portion of the township and also forms the western border north of the city of McBain.

== Demographics ==
Historical population
Census	Pop.	Note	%±
1880	158		—
1890	617		290.5%
1900	773		25.3%
1910	841		8.8%
1920	837		−0.5%
1930	674		−19.5%
1940	695		3.1%
1950	607		−12.7%
1960	572		−5.8%
1970	587		2.6%
1980	773		31.7%
1990	853		10.3%
2000	1,050		23.1%
2010	1,179		12.3%
2020	1,124		−4.7%
U.S. Decennial Census

As of the census of 2000, there were 1,050 people, 320 households, and 263 families residing in the township. The population density was 29.5 inhabitants per square mile (11.4/km^{2}). There were 409 housing units at an average density of 11.5 per square mile (4.4/km^{2}). The racial makeup of the township was 96.00% White, 1.24% African American, 0.10% Native American, 0.10% Asian, 0.86% from other races, and 1.71% from two or more races. Hispanic or Latino of any race were 2.19% of the population.

There were 320 households, out of which 40.9% had children under the age of 18 living with them, 72.2% were married couples living together, 6.9% had a female householder with no husband present, and 17.8% were non-families. 14.1% of all households were made up of individuals, and 7.2% had someone living alone who was 65 years of age or older. The average household size was 2.96 and the average family size was 3.27.

In the township the population was spread out, with 27.4% under the age of 18, 7.9% from 18 to 24, 27.2% from 25 to 44, 18.6% from 45 to 64, and 18.9% who were 65 years of age or older. The median age was 38 years. For every 100 females, there were 100.4 males. For every 100 females age 18 and over, there were 93.9 males.

The median income for a household in the township was $37,857, and the median income for a family was $39,732. Males had a median income of $29,338 versus $23,906 for females. The per capita income for the township was $16,167. About 7.3% of families and 10.3% of the population were below the poverty line, including 14.8% of those under age 18 and none of those age 65 or over.
