= Aetna Township, Missaukee County, Michigan =

Aetna Township, Michigan
- Civil township
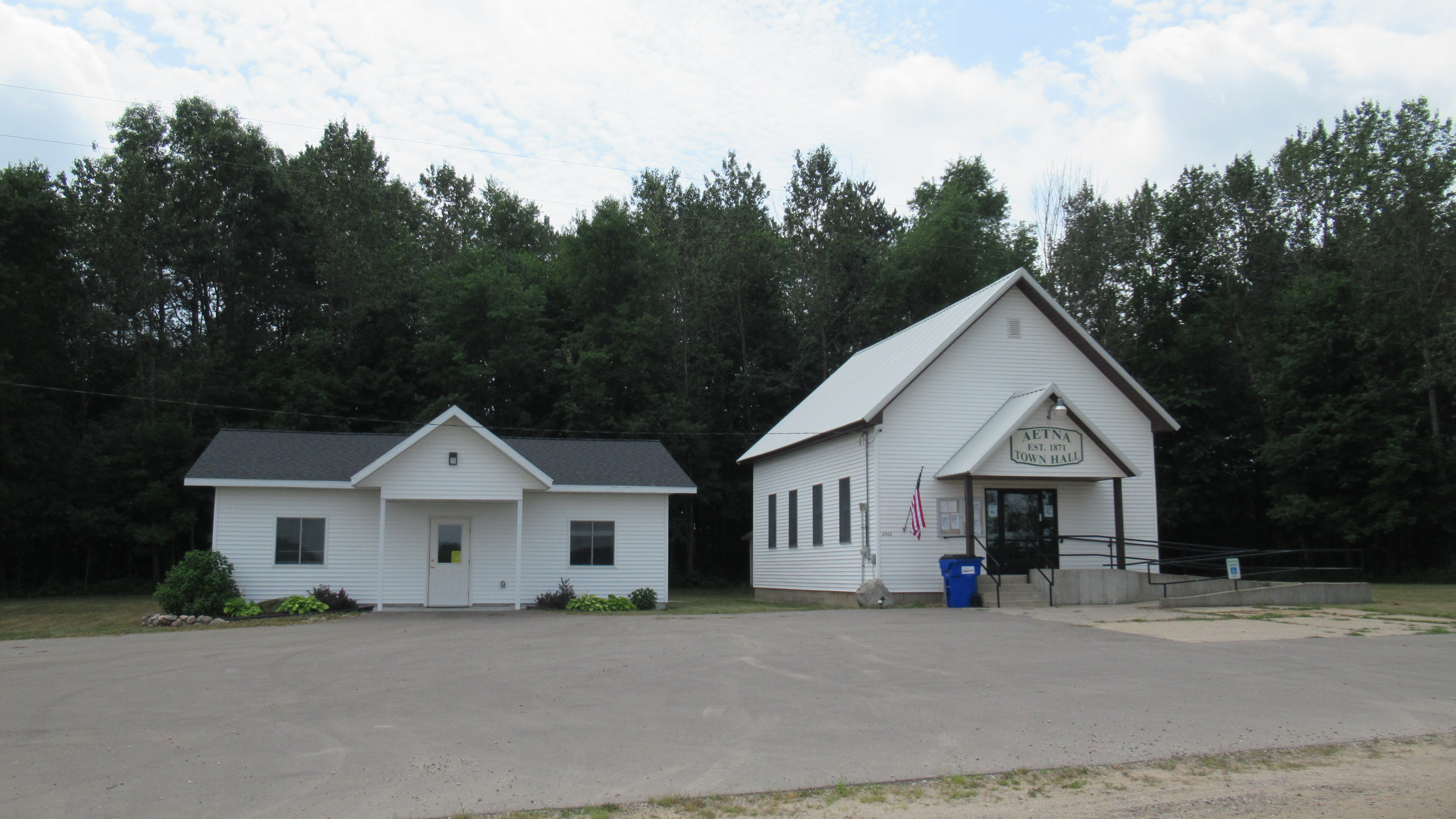
- Aetna Town Hall

- Location within Missaukee County

- Location within the state of Michigan Location within the United States
- Coordinates: 44°17′04″N 85°02′15″W
- Country: United States
- State: Michigan
- County: Missaukee
- Established: 1881

Government
  - Supervisor: Keith Dick
  - Clerk: Linda Brown

Area
  - Total: 35.89 sq mi (92.95 km^{2})
  - Land: 35.88 sq mi (92.93 km^{2})
  - Water: 0.0077 sq mi (0.02 km^{2})
- Elevation: 1,250 ft (381 m)

Population (2020)
  - Total: 429
  - Density: 12/sq mi (4.6/km^{2})
- Time zone: UTC-5 (Eastern (EST))
  - Summer (DST): UTC-4 (EDT)
- ZIP code(s): 49632 (Falmouth); 49651 (Lake City); 49667 (Merritt)
- Area code: 231
- FIPS code: 26-00520
- GNIS feature ID: 1625806
- Website: Official website

Aetna Township is a civil township of Missaukee County in the U.S. state of Michigan. As of the 2020 census, the township population was 429.

== Communities ==
- Dinca is a small unincorporated community in the township at 44°16′44″N 85°03′15″W near the junction of E. Lotan and S. 8 Mile Roads. A rural post office operated from October 20, 1906, until May 31, 1914.
- Barger 44°16′17″N 85°00′10″W was a rural post office in the township, named for farmer Martin S. Barger, that operated from April 5, 1902, until April 29, 1905.
- Mynnings 44°19′20″N 85°04′30″W was a post office and lumber settlement named for lumberman Christen F. Mynning. The post office operated from January 15, 1900, until December 31, 1907.

== Geography ==
According to the U.S. Census Bureau, the township has a total area of 35.88 square miles (92.93 km^{2}), of which 0.01 square miles (0.03 km^{2}), or 0.02%, are water. The township is drained by east-flowing tributaries of the Muskegon River, most notably Butterfield Creek, which crosses the southern portion of the township.

== Highways ==
- M-55 forms the entire northern boundary of the township. The highway leads west to Lake City, the Missaukee county seat, and east to Houghton Lake.

== Demographics ==
Historical population
Census	Pop.	Note	%±
1890	169		—
1900	384		127.2%
1910	631		64.3%
1920	545		−13.6%
1930	513		−5.9%
1940	553		7.8%
1950	507		−8.3%
1960	439		−13.4%
1970	395		−10.0%
1980	437		10.6%
1990	416		−4.8%
2000	491		18.0%
2010	413		−15.9%
2020	429		3.9%
U.S. Decennial Census

As of the census of 2000, there were 491 people, 166 households, and 125 families residing in the township. The population density was 13.7 per square mile (5.3/km^{2}). There were 292 housing units at an average density of 8.1 per square mile (3.1/km^{2}). The racial makeup of the township was 97.76% White, 0.20% African American, 0.41% Native American, 0.20% Asian, 0.61% from other races, and 0.81% from two or more races. Hispanic or Latino of any race were 0.81% of the population.

There were 166 households, out of which 41.0% had children under the age of 18 living with them, 65.7% were married couples living together, 7.2% had a female householder with no husband present, and 24.1% were non-families. 21.7% of all households were made up of individuals, and 9.6% had someone living alone who was 65 years of age or older. The average household size was 2.96 and the average family size was 3.50.

In the township the population was spread out, with 31.2% under the age of 18, 6.7% from 18 to 24, 26.9% from 25 to 44, 22.0% from 45 to 64, and 13.2% who were 65 years of age or older. The median age was 36 years. For every 100 females, there were 103.7 males. For every 100 females age 18 and over, there were 107.4 males.

The median income for a household in the township was $36,964, and the median income for a family was $41,406. Males had a median income of $30,000 versus $21,875 for females. The per capita income for the township was $15,530. About 4.1% of families and 5.4% of the population were below the poverty line, including 1.9% of those under age 18 and 8.3% of those age 65 or over.
