= Missaukee County, Michigan =

County in Michigan, United States

- County
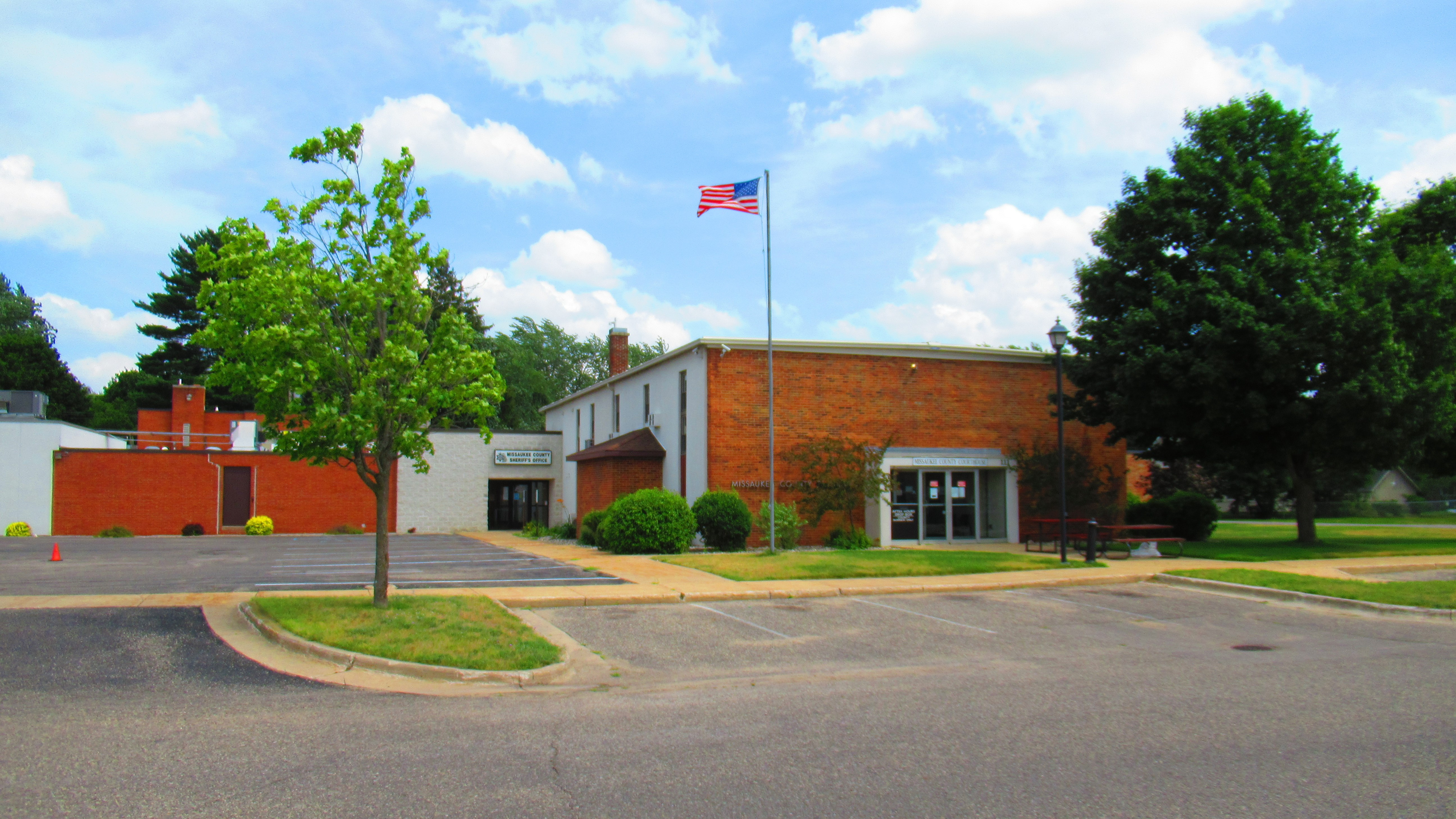
- Missaukee County Courthouse in Lake City

- Location within the U.S. state of Michigan
- Coordinates: 44°20′N 85°06′W
- Country: United States
- State: Michigan
- Created: 1840
- Organized: 1871
- Seat: Lake City
- Largest city: Lake City

Area
  - Total: 574 sq mi (1,490 km^{2})
  - Land: 565 sq mi (1,460 km^{2})
  - Water: 9.1 sq mi (24 km^{2}) 1.6%

Population (2020)
  - Total: 15,052
  - Estimate (2025): 15,274 ▲
  - Density: 26/sq mi (10/km^{2})
- Time zone: UTC−5 (Eastern)
  - Summer (DST): UTC−4 (EDT)
- Congressional district: 1st
- Website: www.missaukee.org

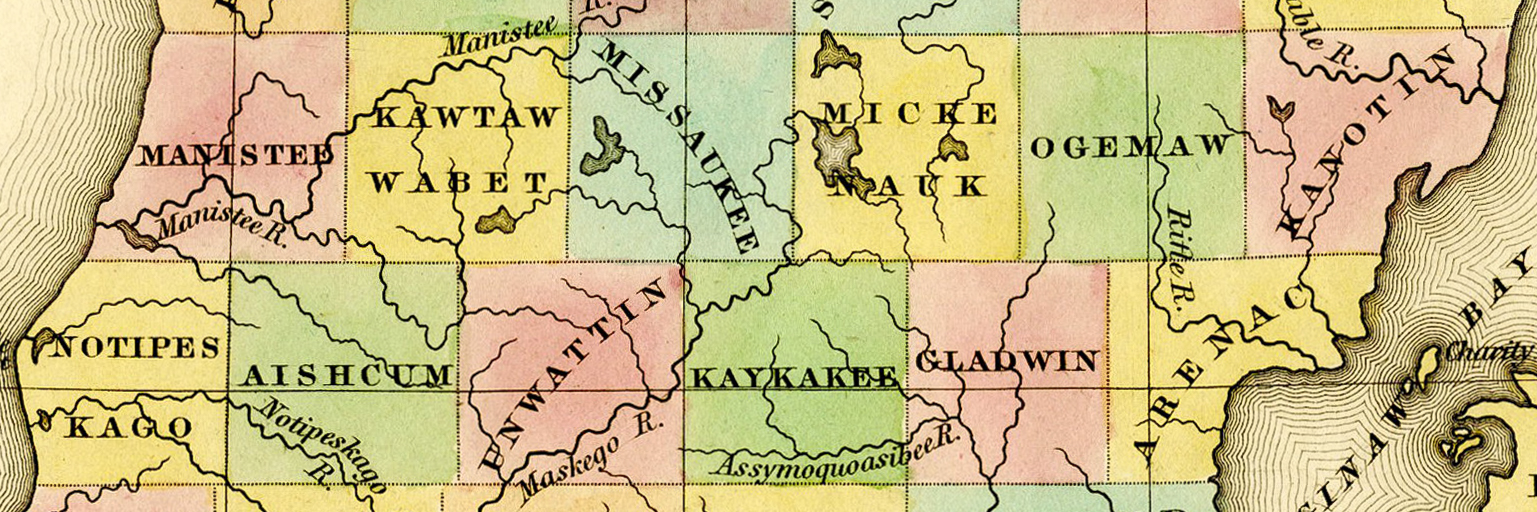
1842 map, showing Missaukee County, then existing only on paper.

Missaukee County (/mɪˈsɔːki/ mih-SAW-kee) is a county located in the U.S. state of Michigan. As of the 2020 census, the population was 15,052. The county seat is Lake City.

Missaukee County is part of the Cadillac, MI micropolitan statistical area. The county is considered to be part of Northern Michigan.

== History ==
Missaukee County was partitioned from Mackinac County, on April 1, 1840, due to expected population growth. In 1851, the county was attached to Grand Traverse County for legal purposes. It was subsequently attached to Manistee County in 1855 and Wexford County in 1869, before being organized in its own right in 1871.

=== Etymology ===
Missaukee County may be named after a prominent Ottawa chief, Nesaukee, who signed the treaties of 1831 and 1833. However, it may also derive from misizaagii, meaning 'large mouth of the river' (and thus a doublet of Mississauga and massasauga).

== Geography ==
According to the U.S. Census Bureau, the county has a total area of 574 square miles (1,490 km^{2}), of which 565 square miles (1,460 km^{2}) is land and 9.1 square miles (24 km^{2}) (1.6%) is water.

=== Lakes and rivers ===
There are 33 natural freshwater lakes in Missaukee County. The largest of these, Lake Missaukee, has a surface area of 1,800 acres (730 ha). The lakes and streams in much of the county drain into the Muskegon River, which flows generally north to south through its eastern tier of townships. The 51.1-mile-long (82.2 km) Clam River, a tributary of the Muskegon, flows generally west to east through the county. The Reedsburg Dam is located within Missaukee County. The Manistee River also flows southwesterly through the extreme northwest of the county.

=== Major highways ===
- M-42 is a short east–west route in the northwest of the county, connecting M-66 near Lake City to US Highway 131 at Manton.
- M-55 is an east–west route traversing the Lower Peninsula.
- M-66 is a north–south route running from the Indiana border to US Highway 31 in Charlevoix.

=== Adjacent counties ===
- Kalkaska County - north
- Crawford County - northeast
- Roscommon County - east
- Clare County - southeast
- Osceola County - southwest
- Wexford County - west
- Grand Traverse County - northwest

== Communities ==
U.S. Census data map showing local municipal boundaries within Missaukee County, including two CDP boundaries. Shaded areas represent incorporated cities.

=== Cities ===
- Lake City (county seat)
- McBain

=== Civil townships ===
- Aetna Township
- Bloomfield Township
- Butterfield Township
- Caldwell Township
- Clam Union Township
- Enterprise Township
- Forest Township
- Holland Township
- Lake Township
- Norwich Township
- Pioneer Township
- Reeder Township
- Richland Township
- Riverside Township
- West Branch Township

=== Census-designated places ===
- Falmouth
- Jennings

=== Other unincorporated communities ===
- Arlene
- Butterfield
- Dinca
- Lucas
- Merritt
- Moddersville
- Moorestown
- Pioneer
- Prosper
- Star City
- Vogel Center

=== Ghost towns ===
- Barger
- Dolph
- Edson Corners
- Forward
- Frey
- Galt
- Garfield
- Keelans Corner
- Missaukee
- Mynnings
- Stratford

== Demographics ==
Historical population
Census	Pop.	Note	%±
1870	130		—
1880	1,553		1,094.6%
1890	5,048		225.0%
1900	9,308		84.4%
1910	10,606		13.9%
1920	9,004		−15.1%
1930	6,992		−22.3%
1940	8,034		14.9%
1950	7,458		−7.2%
1960	6,784		−9.0%
1970	7,126		5.0%
1980	10,009		40.5%
1990	12,147		21.4%
2000	14,478		19.2%
2010	14,849		2.6%
2020	15,052		1.4%
2025 (est.)	15,274	▲	1.5%
U.S. Decennial Census; 1790-1960 1900-1990; 1990-2000 2010-2018

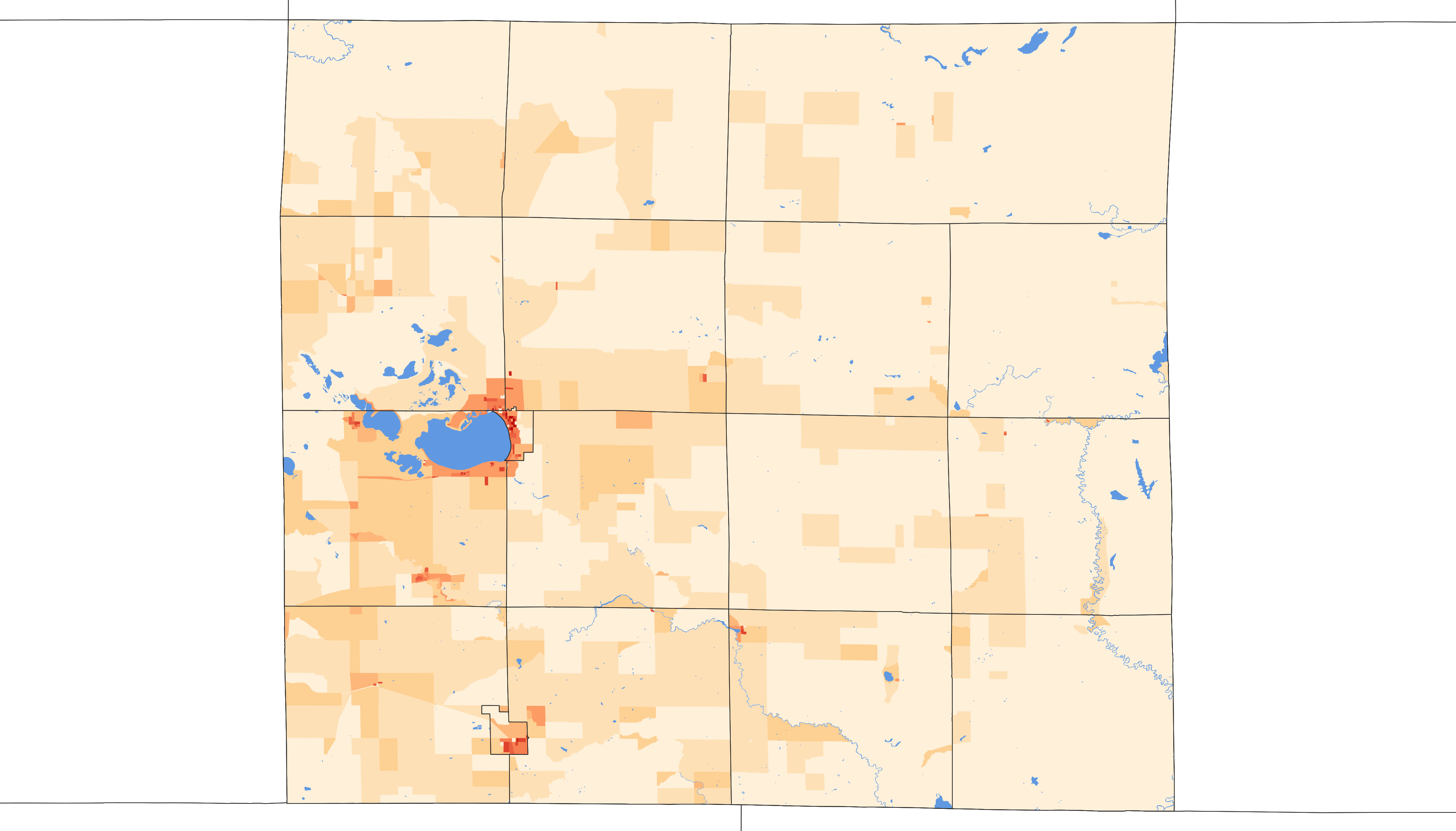
2020 population density of Missaukee County MI by census block

=== Racial and ethnic composition ===
Missaukee County, Michigan – Racial and ethnic composition Note: the US Census treats Hispanic/Latino as an ethnic category. This table excludes Latinos from the racial categories and assigns them to a separate category. Hispanics/Latinos may be of any race.
Race / Ethnicity (NH = Non-Hispanic)	Pop 1980	Pop 1990	Pop 2000	Pop 2010	Pop 2020	% 1980	% 1990	% 2000	% 2010	% 2020
White alone (NH)	9,903	11,978	14,030	14,230	13,940	98.94%	98.61%	96.91%	95.83%	92.61%
Black or African American alone (NH)	2	3	27	42	33	0.02%	0.02%	0.19%	0.28%	0.22%
Native American or Alaska Native alone (NH)	34	74	69	71	48	0.34%	0.61%	0.48%	0.48%	0.32%
Asian alone (NH)	15	25	35	45	43	0.15%	0.21%	0.24%	0.30%	0.29%
Native Hawaiian or Pacific Islander alone (NH)	x	x	0	1	1	x	x	0.00%	0.01%	0.01%
Other race alone (NH)	29	0	6	0	23	0.29%	0.00%	0.04%	0.00%	0.15%
Mixed race or Multiracial (NH)	x	x	142	154	465	x	x	0.98%	1.04%	3.09%
Hispanic or Latino (any race)	26	67	169	306	499	0.26%	0.55%	1.17%	2.06%	3.32%
Total	10,009	12,147	14,478	14,849	15,052	100.00%	100.00%	100.00%	100.00%	100.00%

=== 2020 census ===
As of the 2020 census, the county had a population of 15,052. The median age was 43.8 years; 22.7% of residents were under the age of 18 and 21.3% were 65 years of age or older. For every 100 females there were 103.6 males, and for every 100 females age 18 and over there were 103.8 males age 18 and over.

The racial makeup of the county was 93.6% White, 0.2% Black or African American, 0.5% American Indian and Alaska Native, 0.3% Asian, <0.1% Native Hawaiian and Pacific Islander, 1.3% from some other race, and 4.1% from two or more races. Hispanic or Latino residents of any race comprised 3.3% of the population, and the county remained predominantly non-Hispanic white.

<0.1% of residents lived in urban areas, while 100.0% lived in rural areas.

There were 5,923 households in the county, of which 28.2% had children under the age of 18 living in them. Of all households, 54.5% were married-couple households, 18.8% were households with a male householder and no spouse or partner present, and 19.1% were households with a female householder and no spouse or partner present. About 24.8% of all households were made up of individuals and 11.8% had someone living alone who was 65 years of age or older.

There were 8,615 housing units, of which 31.2% were vacant. Among occupied housing units, 82.3% were owner-occupied and 17.7% were renter-occupied. The homeowner vacancy rate was 1.2% and the rental vacancy rate was 7.6%.

=== 2000 census ===
At the census of 2000, there were 14,478 people, 5,450 households, and 4,043 families residing in the county. The population density was 26 inhabitants per square mile (10/km^{2}). There were 8,621 housing units at an average density of 15 per square mile (5.8/km^{2}). The racial makeup of the county was 97.50% White, 0.20% Black or African American, 0.50% Native American, 0.24% Asian, 0.37% from other races, and 1.19% from two or more races. 1.17% of the population were Hispanic or Latino of any race. 24.6% were of Dutch, 18.3% German, 10.8% American, 10.0% English and 7.4% Irish ancestry. 97.9% spoke English and 1.1% Spanish as their first language.

In 2000, the median income for a household in the county was $35,224, and the median income for a family was $39,057. Males had a median income of $30,565 versus $20,905 for females. The per capita income for the county was $16,072. About 8.20% of families and 10.70% of the population were below the poverty line, including 13.20% of those under age 18 and 10.40% of those age 65 or over.

=== Religion ===
The Christian Reformed Church in North America was the biggest denomination in the county with 2,010 members and 7 congregations, almost 50% of the counties population adhere to the CRCNA, followed by the Reformed Church in America with 3 congregations and 830 members, the third is the United Methodist Church with 3 churches and 500 members, the PC(USA) has 2 congregations and 200 members, but the Evangelical Presbyterian Church, the Lutherans (ELCA), baptists are also represented with 1 congregations each. Missaukee County is part of the Roman Catholic Diocese of Gaylord and has 1 congregations and 800 members. There is an Amish community in the county, founded in 2000, with two church districts in 2013.

== Education ==
The Wexford-Missaukee Intermediate School District, based in Cadillac, services the school districts in the county. The intermediate school district offers regional special education services and technical career programs to students of its districts. Missaukee County is served by two regular public school districts, Lake City Area Schools and McBain Rural Agricultural School. Missaukee County has one private school, Northern Michigan Christian School.

== Government and politics ==
United States presidential election results for Missaukee County, Michigan
Year	Republican		Democratic		Third party(ies)	
Year	No.	%	No.	%	No.	%
1884	470	54.09%	373	42.92%	26	2.99%
1888	632	50.44%	572	45.65%	49	3.91%
1892	665	48.61%	622	45.47%	81	5.92%
1896	899	55.15%	687	42.15%	44	2.70%
1900	1,421	67.12%	616	29.10%	80	3.78%
1904	1,781	80.77%	345	15.65%	79	3.58%
1908	1,570	74.98%	445	21.25%	79	3.77%
1912	671	32.88%	347	17.00%	1,023	50.12%
1916	1,160	54.46%	917	43.05%	53	2.49%
1920	1,801	82.46%	345	15.80%	38	1.74%
1924	1,723	85.09%	208	10.27%	94	4.64%
1928	1,756	87.19%	247	12.26%	11	0.55%
1932	1,439	51.60%	1,282	45.97%	68	2.44%
1936	1,730	54.69%	1,385	43.79%	48	1.52%
1940	2,154	66.83%	1,037	32.17%	32	0.99%
1944	1,979	71.63%	759	27.47%	25	0.90%
1948	1,742	68.21%	750	29.37%	62	2.43%
1952	2,525	80.01%	600	19.01%	31	0.98%
1956	2,433	76.80%	727	22.95%	8	0.25%
1960	2,531	79.82%	627	19.77%	13	0.41%
1964	1,786	58.08%	1,288	41.89%	1	0.03%
1968	2,161	67.72%	736	23.06%	294	9.21%
1972	2,647	71.79%	924	25.06%	116	3.15%
1976	2,943	62.87%	1,688	36.06%	50	1.07%
1980	3,221	63.47%	1,563	30.80%	291	5.73%
1984	3,970	75.53%	1,256	23.90%	30	0.57%
1988	3,566	68.26%	1,621	31.03%	37	0.71%
1992	2,829	46.70%	1,893	31.25%	1,336	22.05%
1996	3,012	49.99%	2,256	37.44%	757	12.56%
2000	4,274	65.79%	2,062	31.74%	160	2.46%
2004	5,055	68.12%	2,319	31.25%	47	0.63%
2008	4,469	59.65%	2,898	38.68%	125	1.67%
2012	4,665	66.39%	2,274	32.36%	88	1.25%
2016	5,386	73.61%	1,565	21.39%	366	5.00%
2020	6,648	75.93%	1,967	22.47%	140	1.60%
2024	7,066	77.21%	1,945	21.25%	141	1.54%

United States Senate election results for Missaukee County, Michigan1
Year	Republican		Democratic		Third party(ies)	
Year	No.	%	No.	%	No.	%
2024	6,828	75.72%	1,934	21.45%	256	2.84%

Michigan Gubernatorial election results for Missaukee County
Year	Republican		Democratic		Third party(ies)	
Year	No.	%	No.	%	No.	%
2022	5,306	71.24%	1,995	26.79%	147	1.97%

The county government operates the jail, maintains rural roads, operates the major local courts, keeps files of deeds and mortgages, maintains vital records, administers public health regulations, and participates with the state in the provision of welfare and other social services. The county board of commissioners controls the budget but has only limited authority to make laws or ordinances. In Michigan, most local government functions — police and fire, building and zoning, tax assessment, street maintenance, etc. — are the responsibility of individual cities and townships.

=== Elected officials ===
- Prosecuting Attorney: David DenHouten
- Sheriff: Wilbur "Wil" Yancer
- County Clerk/Register of Deeds: Jessica Nielsen
- County Treasurer: Lori Cox
- Road Commissioners: Jack McGee; Larry Norman; Lonny Lutke

(information as of February 2021)

=== Election history ===
Missaukee County is one of Michigan's most strongly Republican counties, and one of the most consistently Republican in the nation since that party was founded. No Democratic presidential candidate has ever won Missaukee County since it was organized: even Lyndon Johnson in 1964 when he swept the Northeast received no more than 42 percent of the county's vote, which made Missaukee Barry Goldwater’s strongest county north or east of the Great Lakes. No Democrat since has received more than Barack Obama's 38 percent in 2008. In 2004, Republican George W. Bush received 68.1% in Missaukee County, his second highest percentage among Michigan's 83 counties. In 2008, Republican candidate John McCain was held down to below 60 percent, the only time and it has happened since 1964 without a strong third-party showing (Ross Perot in both 1992 and 1996) and just the second time since 1936. Regardless, it was still his second-strongest county in Michigan after Ottawa County, as he won by 21 points while Barack Obama carried the state by 16.4 points. In 2016, 2020, and 2024, the county was Donald Trump's strongest in Michigan as he won it all three times by more than 50 points. In 2002, Republican gubernatorial nominee Dick Posthumus received 66.1% in Missaukee, which also ranked it as the #2 most Republican county in the state.

Despite its strong Republican leanings, Missaukee County has voted for Democratic gubernatorial candidates on two rare occasions, those being for James Blanchard in 1986 and William B. Fitzgerald Jr. in 1978.

== See also ==
- List of Michigan State Historic Sites in Missaukee County, Michigan
- National Register of Historic Places listings in Missaukee County, Michigan

== Bibliography ==
- "Bibliography on Missaukee County". Clarke Historical Library, Central Michigan University.
