= Richland Township, Missaukee County, Michigan =

Richland Township, Michigan
- Civil township
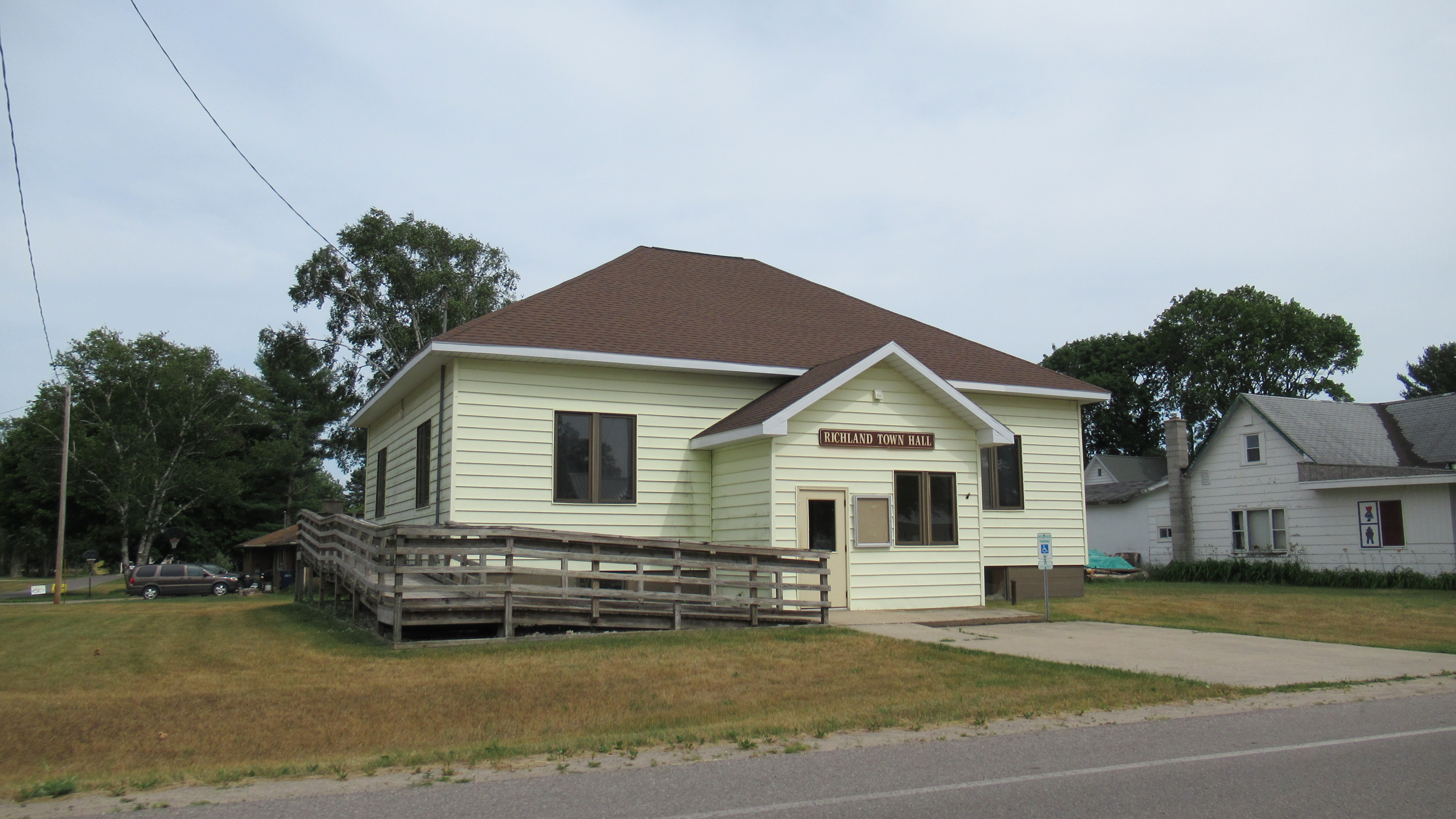
- Richland Town Hall

- Location within Missaukee County

- Location within the state of Michigan Location within the United States
- Coordinates: 44°12′35″N 85°16′14″W
- Country: United States
- State: Michigan
- County: Missaukee
- Established: 1876

Government
  - Supervisor: Greg Buning
  - Clerk: Sarah Lutke

Area
  - Total: 35.58 sq mi (92.15 km^{2})
  - Land: 35.51 sq mi (91.97 km^{2})
  - Water: 0.069 sq mi (0.18 km^{2})
- Elevation: 1,306 ft (398 m)

Population (2020)
  - Total: 1,489
  - Density: 41.9/sq mi (16.2/km^{2})
- Time zone: UTC-5 (Eastern (EST))
  - Summer (DST): UTC-4 (EDT)
- ZIP code(s): 49657 (McBain); 49601 (Cadillac); 49665 (Marion)
- Area code: 231
- FIPS code: 26-68280
- GNIS feature ID: 1626971
- Website: Official website

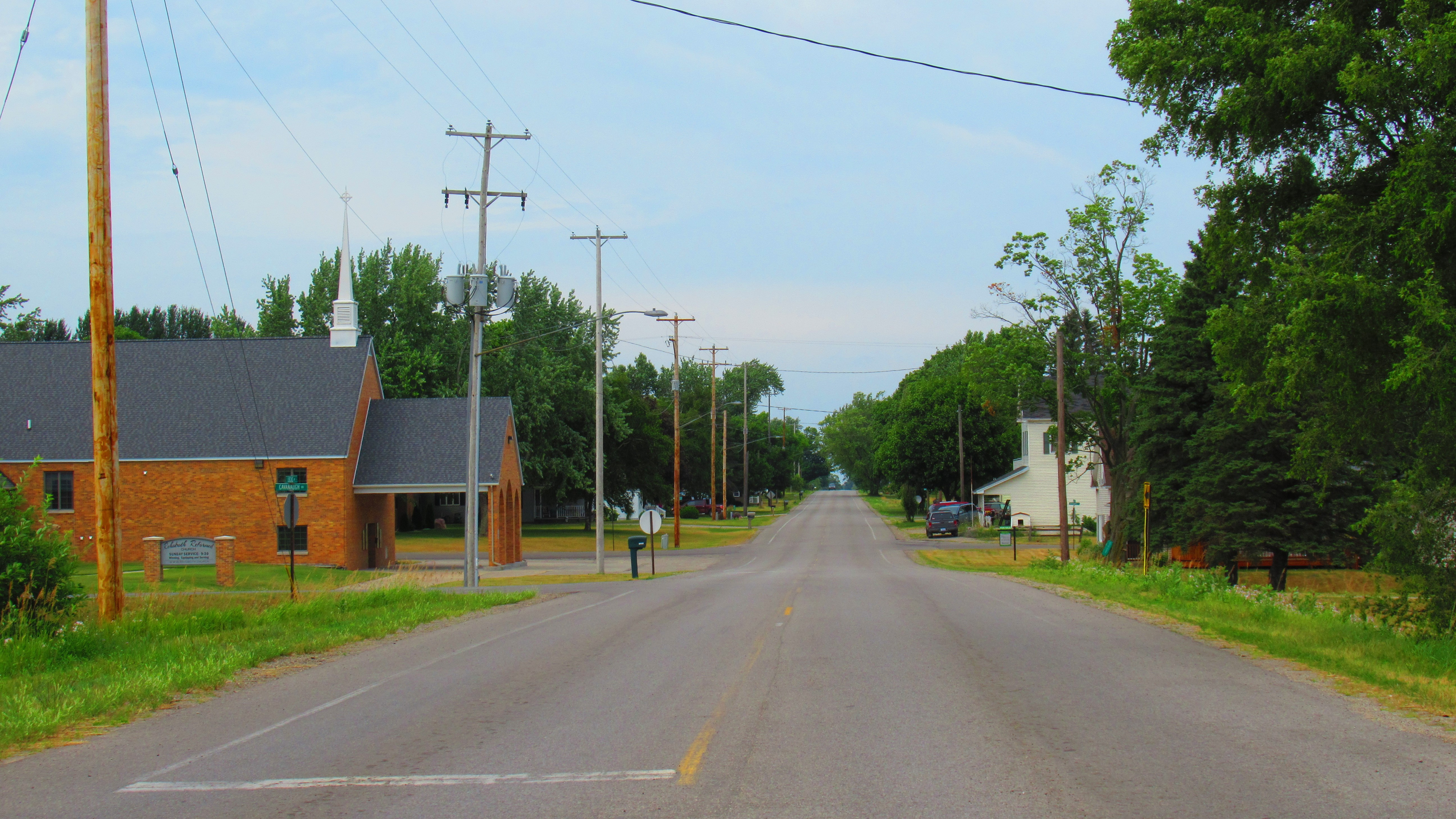
Community of Lucas

Richland Township is a civil township of Missaukee County in the U.S. state of Michigan. The population was 1,489 at the 2020 census.

== Communities ==
- Lucas is an unincorporated community in the township at 44°13′06″N 85°17′06″W. It was founded in 1878 by William Taylor. A number of Dutch settlers, including Harm Lucas and his five sons, arrived in 1882. A post office was established on February 23, 1883, named "Lucas" after Harm Lucas, with Abraham Lucas as the first postmaster. The office closed on February 16, 1885, and re-opened on September 7, 1886, with Peter Van den Bosch as postmaster. The office was discontinued on June 30, 1957, and became a rural branch/station of McBain until 1972.
- Garfield was a rural post office in the township. The post office opened on July 12, 1880, with farmer William N. Taylor as the first postmaster, and operated until June 15, 1882.
- The city of McBain borders the township to the east (with half of its area incorporating land from the township). The McBain post office with ZIP code 49657 serves most of Richland Township.

== Geography ==
Richland Township is in the southwest corner of Missaukee County, bordered to the west by Wexford County and to the south by Osceola County. According to the U.S. Census Bureau, the township has a total area of 35.58 square miles (92.15 km^{2}), of which 35.51 square miles (91.97 km^{2}) are land and 0.07 square miles (0.18 km^{2}), or 0.20%, are water. The Clam River, an east-flowing tributary of the Muskegon River, crosses the northeast corner of the township.

== Highways ==
- M-55 touches the northwest corner of the township.
- M-66 forms the eastern boundary of the township north of McBain.

== Demographics ==
Historical population
Census	Pop.	Note	%±
1880	76		—
1890	534		602.6%
1900	1,166		118.4%
1910	1,187		1.8%
1920	971		−18.2%
1930	878		−9.6%
1940	903		2.8%
1950	862		−4.5%
1960	844		−2.1%
1970	865		2.5%
1980	1,008		16.5%
1990	1,236		22.6%
2000	1,445		16.9%
2010	1,491		3.2%
2020	1,489		−0.1%
U.S. Decennial Census

As of the census of 2000, there were 1,445 people, 486 households, and 393 families residing in the township. The population density was 40.6 inhabitants per square mile (15.7/km^{2}). There were 558 housing units at an average density of 15.7 per square mile (6.1/km^{2}). The racial makeup of the township was 98.69% White, 0.14% Native American, 0.35% Asian, 0.21% from other races, and 0.62% from two or more races. Hispanic or Latino of any race were 0.48% of the population.

There were 486 households, out of which 45.7% had children under the age of 18 living with them, 73.7% were married couples living together, 4.5% had a female householder with no husband present, and 19.1% were non-families. 15.6% of all households were made up of individuals, and 4.7% had someone living alone who was 65 years of age or older. The average household size was 2.97 and the average family size was 3.34.

In the township the population was spread out, with 32.9% under the age of 18, 8.0% from 18 to 24, 30.6% from 25 to 44, 19.0% from 45 to 64, and 9.6% who were 65 years of age or older. The median age was 33 years. For every 100 females, there were 103.2 males. For every 100 females age 18 and over, there were 101.2 males.

The median income for a household in the township was $45,833, and the median income for a family was $48,947. Males had a median income of $35,250 versus $20,956 for females. The per capita income for the township was $15,834. About 4.3% of families and 4.6% of the population were below the poverty line, including 7.2% of those under age 18 and 5.7% of those age 65 or over.
