= McBain, Michigan =

- City
- City of McBain
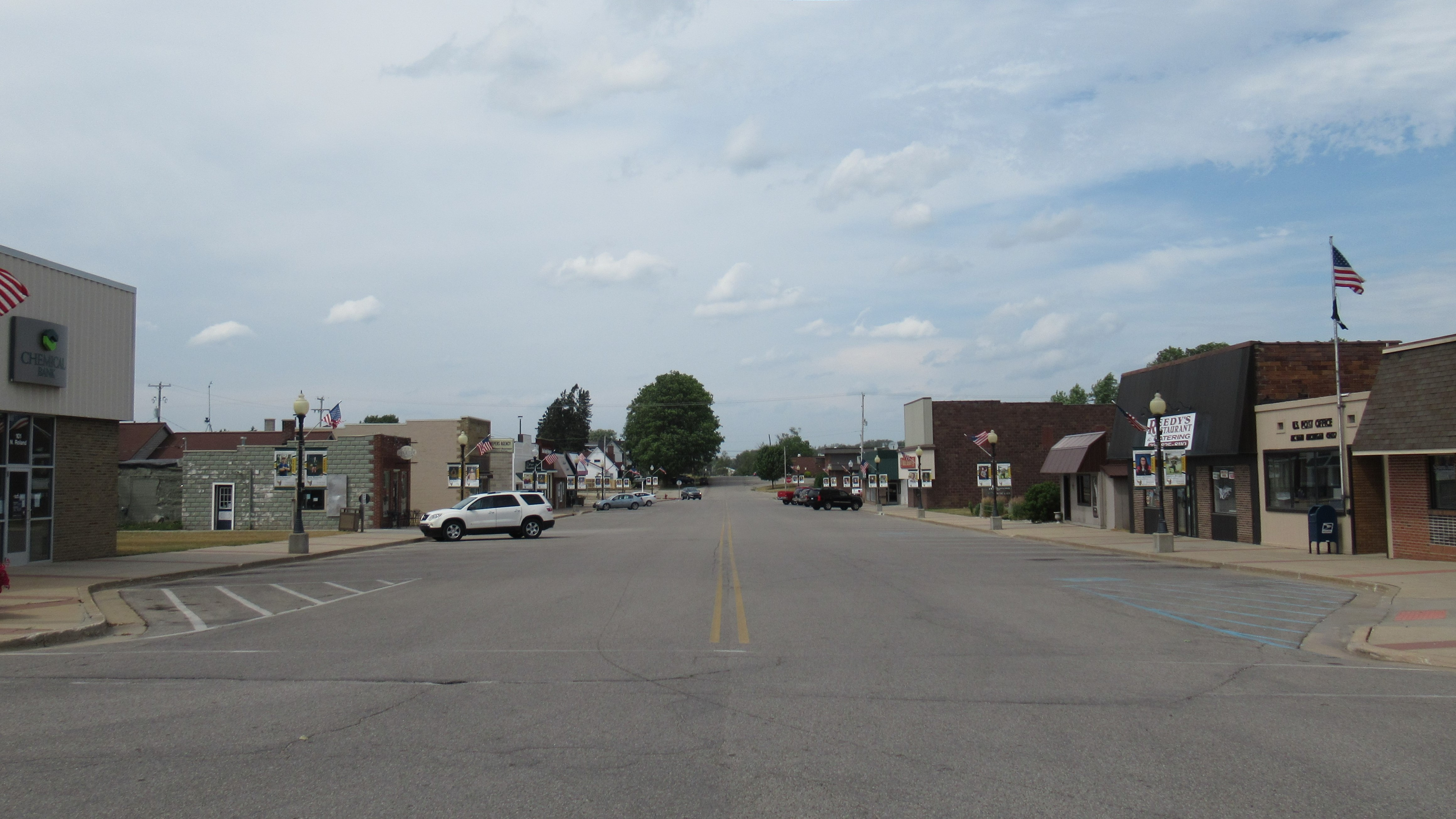
- N. Roland Street looking north toward M-66

- Location within Missaukee County

- Location within the state of Michigan Location within the United States
- Coordinates: 44°11′37″N 85°12′48″W
- Country: United States
- State: Michigan
- County: Missaukee
- Settled: 1887
- Incorporated: 1893 (village); 1907 (city)

Government
  - Type: Mayor–council
  - Mayor: Joey Roberts
  - Clerk: Paula Dykhouse

Area
  - Total: 1.26 sq mi (3.26 km^{2})
  - Land: 1.26 sq mi (3.26 km^{2})
  - Water: 0 sq mi (0.00 km^{2})
- Elevation: 1,237 ft (377 m)

Population (2020)
  - Total: 637
  - Density: 505.56/sq mi (195.20/km^{2})
- Time zone: UTC-5 (Eastern (EST))
  - Summer (DST): UTC-4 (EDT)
- ZIP code(s): 49657
- Area code: 231
- FIPS code: 26-49980
- GNIS feature ID: 631799
- Website: Official website

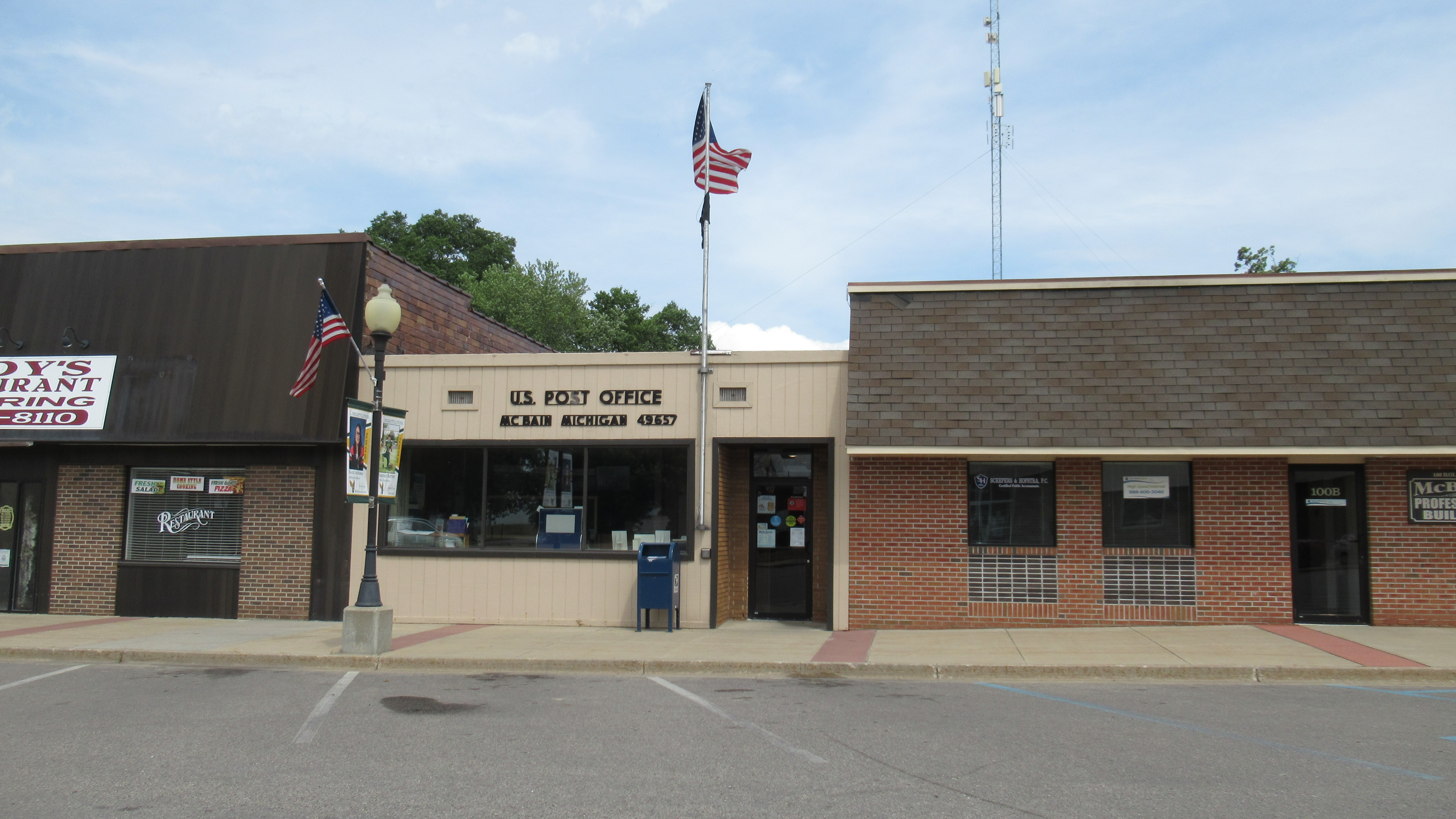
U.S. Post Office in McBain

McBain is a city in Missaukee County in the U.S. state of Michigan. The population was 637 at the 2020 census, making McBain the eighth-smallest city in the state of Michigan by population.

== History ==
McBain began as a settlement around a sawmill in Riverside Township, founded by John McBain in 1887. A station on the Toledo, Ann Arbor and North Michigan Railway opened on August 27, 1888 and a post office with the name Owens opened on September 10, 1888. The post office was renamed McBain on September 17, 1889. McBain incorporated as a village in 1893 and as a city in 1907.

== Geography ==
McBain is in southwestern Missaukee County, bordered to the east by Riverside Township and to the west by Richland Township. It is 10 miles (16 km) south of Lake City, the county seat, and 13 miles (21 km) east-southeast of Cadillac.

According to the U.S. Census Bureau, the city has a total area of 1.26 square miles (3.26 km^{2}), all land.

== Demographics ==
Historical population
Census	Pop.	Note	%±
1900	709		—
1910	546		−23.0%
1920	547		0.2%
1930	463		−15.4%
1940	489		5.6%
1950	506		3.5%
1960	551		8.9%
1970	520		−5.6%
1980	519		−0.2%
1990	692		33.3%
2000	584		−15.6%
2010	656		12.3%
2020	637		−2.9%
U.S. Decennial Census

=== 2010 census ===
As of the census of 2010, there were 656 people, 249 households, and 159 families residing in the city. The population density was 524.8 inhabitants per square mile (202.6/km^{2}). There were 275 housing units at an average density of 220.0 per square mile (84.9/km^{2}). The racial makeup of the city was 95.6% White, 0.3% African American, 0.3% Native American, 0.5% Asian, 2.6% from other races, and 0.8% from two or more races. Hispanic or Latino of any race were 3.4% of the population.

There were 249 households, of which 30.5% had children under the age of 18 living with them, 46.2% were married couples living together, 14.1% had a female householder with no husband present, 3.6% had a male householder with no wife present, and 36.1% were non-families. 32.9% of all households were made up of individuals, and 16.1% had someone living alone who was 65 years of age or older. The average household size was 2.29 and the average family size was 2.89.

The median age in the city was 45.9 years. 22.1% of residents were under the age of 18; 8.1% were between the ages of 18 and 24; 18.9% were from 25 to 44; 22.3% were from 45 to 64; and 28.7% were 65 years of age or older. The gender makeup of the city was 42.1% male and 57.9% female.

=== 2000 census ===
As of the census of 2000, there were 584 people, 246 households, and 154 families residing in the city. The population density was 478.6 inhabitants per square mile (184.8/km^{2}). There were 271 housing units at an average density of 222.1 per square mile (85.8/km^{2}). The racial makeup of the city was 98.12% White, 0.86% African American, 0.34% Native American, 0.17% Asian, and 0.51% from two or more races. Hispanic or Latino of any race were 1.20% of the population.

There were 246 households, out of which 30.1% had children under the age of 18 living with them, 53.3% were married couples living together, 8.1% had a female householder with no husband present, and 37.0% were non-families. 33.7% of all households were made up of individuals, and 22.8% had someone living alone who was 65 years of age or older. The average household size was 2.35 and the average family size was 3.07.

In the city, the population was spread out, with 25.7% under the age of 18, 9.1% from 18 to 24, 22.6% from 25 to 44, 19.5% from 45 to 64, and 23.1% who were 65 years of age or older. The median age was 40 years. For every 100 females, there were 77.0 males. For every 100 females age 18 and over, there were 72.2 males.

The median income for a household in the city was $35,156, and the median income for a family was $43,594. Males had a median income of $31,538 versus $21,607 for females. The per capita income for the city was $19,356. About 3.8% of families and 5.2% of the population were below the poverty line, including 5.8% of those under age 18 and 7.3% of those age 65 or over.

== Education ==
McBain Rural Agricultural School and Northern Michigan Christian School serves the community.

== Notable people ==
- Former Chicago Bears defensive lineman Dan Bazuin is from McBain.

== Climate ==
This climatic region is typified by large seasonal temperature differences, with warm to hot (and often humid) summers and cold (sometimes severely cold) winters. According to the Köppen Climate Classification system, McBain has a humid continental climate, abbreviated "Dfb" on climate maps.
