= Lake City, Michigan =

- City
- City of Lake City
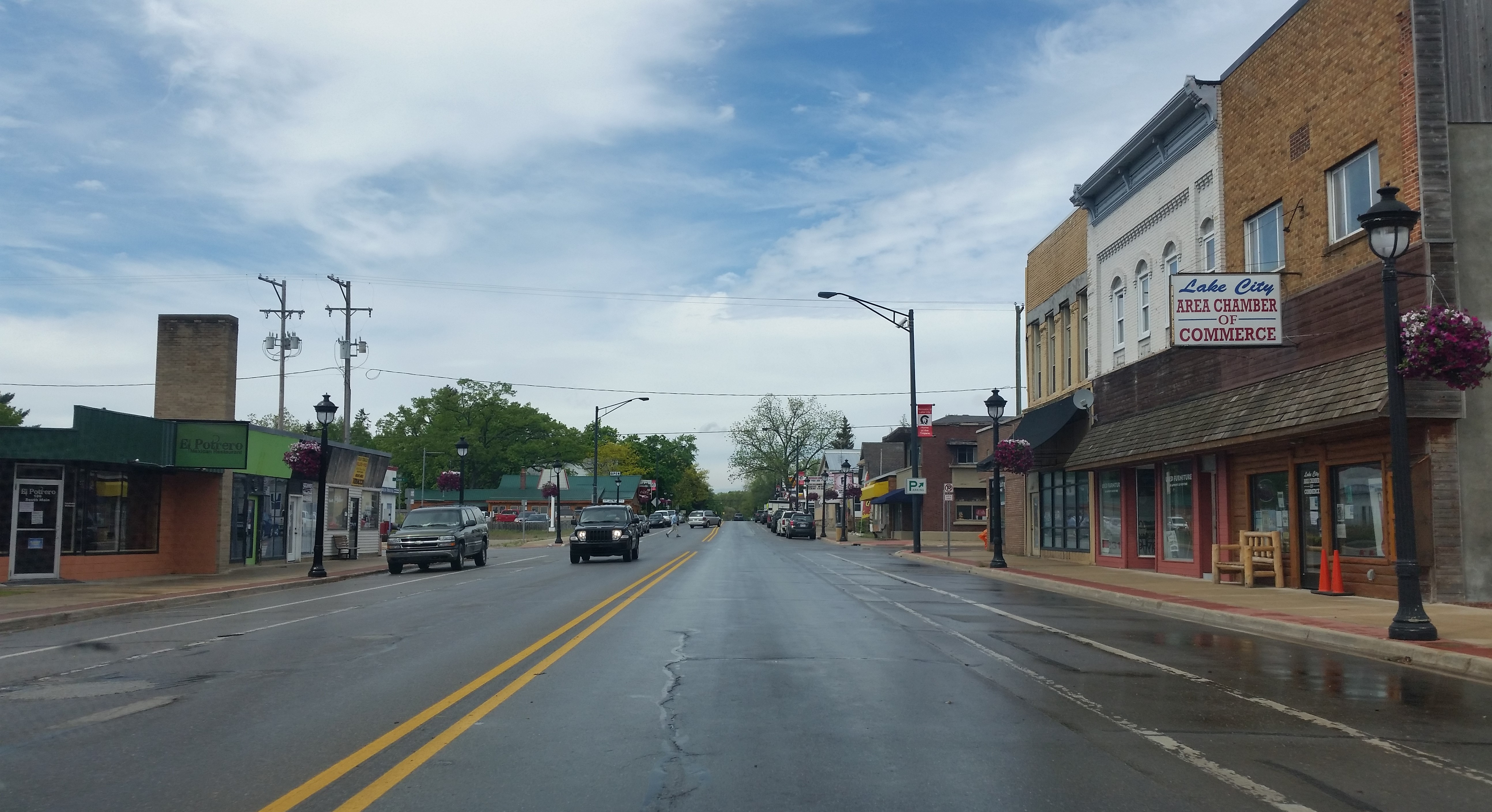
- Looking north along Main Street (M-66)
- Nickname: "Michigan's Christmas Tree Capital"
- Location within Missaukee County

- Location within the state of Michigan Location within the United States
- Coordinates: 44°19′57″N 85°12′47″W
- Country: United States
- State: Michigan
- County: Missaukee
- Settled: 1868
- Incorporated: 1889 (village); 1932 (city)

Government
  - Type: Mayor–council
  - Mayor: Cheryl Sellers-Seger
  - Clerk: Maria Grgurich
  - Administrator: Patrick Smith

Area
  - Total: 1.05 sq mi (2.71 km^{2})
  - Land: 1.05 sq mi (2.71 km^{2})
  - Water: 0 sq mi (0.00 km^{2})
- Elevation: 1,250 ft (381 m)

Population (2020)
  - Total: 829
  - Density: 789.52/sq mi (304.84/km^{2})
- Time zone: UTC-5 (Eastern (EST))
  - Summer (DST): UTC-4 (EDT)
- ZIP code(s): 49651
- Area code: 231
- FIPS code: 26-44480
- GNIS feature ID: 0629968, 1626581
- Website: Official website

Lake City is a city in and county seat of Missaukee County in the U.S. state of Michigan. As of the 2020 census, the population of Lake City was 829. Lake City has been nicknamed "Michigan's Christmas Tree Capital", due to the high number of farms near the city.

== History ==
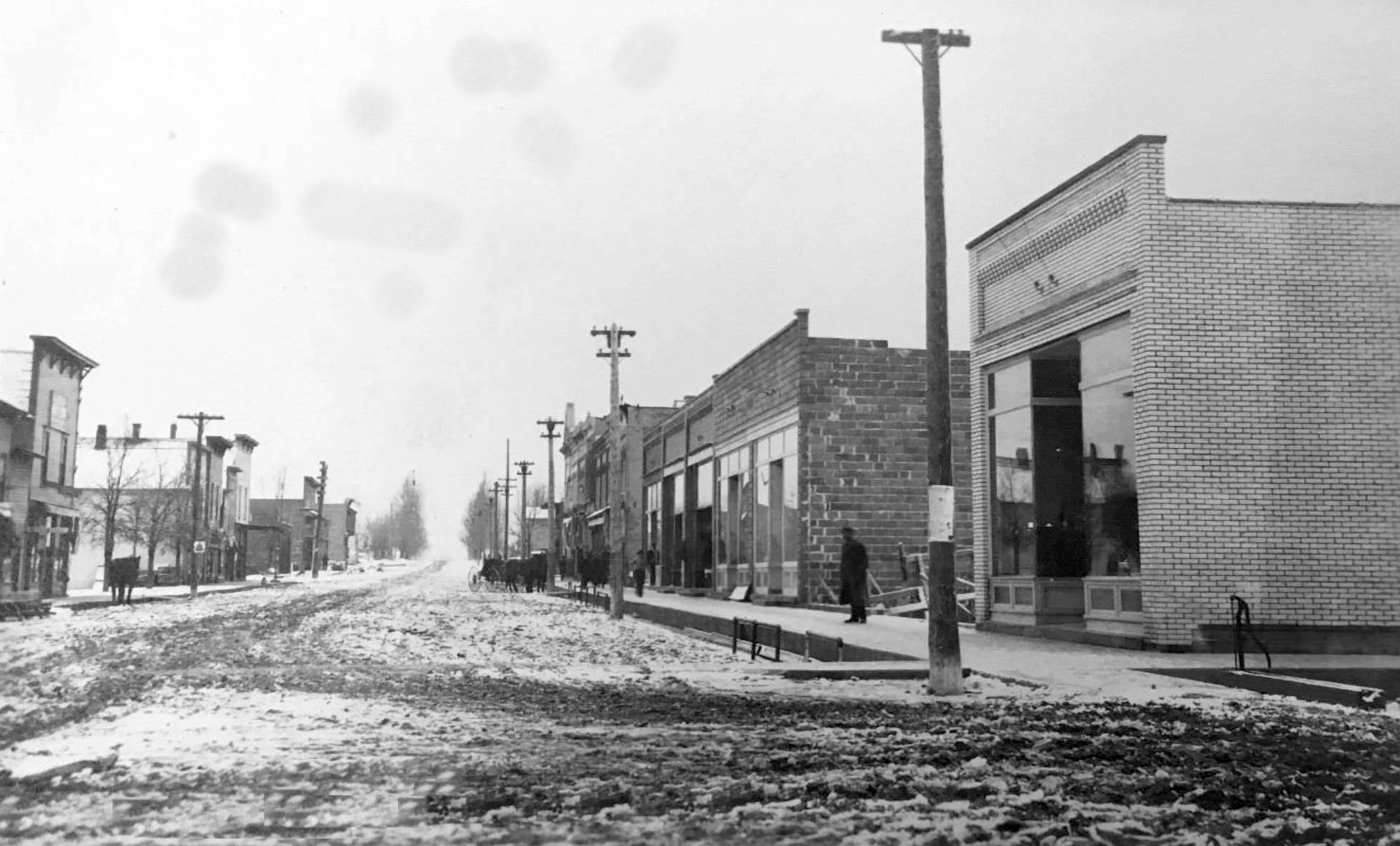
Lake City, 1890s

The community's first settler, Daniel Reader, built his cabin on Muskrat Lake, now Lake Missaukee, in 1868. On January 22, 1872, Reeder was the name of post office open and the last name of its first postmaster, Daniel. The county selected Reeder by a one-vote margin as the county seat in 1873. The community became a station of the Grand Rapids and Indiana Railroad. The community was renamed on January 25, 1877, to Lake City. Lake City was incorporated as a village and platted in 1889. The village became a city in 1932.

Much of Missaukee County grew in the early 20th century because of the region's timber industry. The community continues to thrive because of local lumber mills.

== Geography ==
Lake City is in western Missaukee County, 14 miles (23 km) by road northeast of Cadillac and 13 miles (21 km) southeast of Manton. According to the United States Census Bureau, the city has a total area of 1.05 square miles (2.72 km^{2}), all land.

Lake City derives its name from the numerous lakes within the vicinity, including Lake Missaukee, which forms the western boundary of the city. Other large lakes nearby include Crooked Lake and Sapphire Lake.

=== Climate ===
Climate data for Lake City, Michigan (1991–2020 normals, extremes 1896–present)
Month	Jan	Feb	Mar	Apr	May	Jun	Jul	Aug	Sep	Oct	Nov	Dec	Year
Record high °F (°C)	61 (16)	69 (21)	86 (30)	87 (31)	93 (34)	103 (39)	106 (41)	100 (38)	97 (36)	89 (32)	76 (24)	64 (18)	106 (41)
Mean maximum °F (°C)	45.0 (7.2)	48.1 (8.9)	61.2 (16.2)	74.6 (23.7)	83.6 (28.7)	89.1 (31.7)	90.1 (32.3)	89.1 (31.7)	85.3 (29.6)	75.9 (24.4)	61.6 (16.4)	49.0 (9.4)	92.4 (33.6)
Mean daily maximum °F (°C)	27.3 (−2.6)	30.3 (−0.9)	40.5 (4.7)	53.2 (11.8)	66.3 (19.1)	76.2 (24.6)	80.4 (26.9)	78.6 (25.9)	71.1 (21.7)	57.3 (14.1)	43.4 (6.3)	32.6 (0.3)	54.8 (12.7)
Daily mean °F (°C)	18.6 (−7.4)	19.9 (−6.7)	28.9 (−1.7)	41.3 (5.2)	53.6 (12.0)	63.4 (17.4)	67.5 (19.7)	65.7 (18.7)	57.9 (14.4)	46.1 (7.8)	34.8 (1.6)	25.0 (−3.9)	43.6 (6.4)
Mean daily minimum °F (°C)	9.9 (−12.3)	9.6 (−12.4)	17.3 (−8.2)	29.4 (−1.4)	40.9 (4.9)	50.7 (10.4)	54.5 (12.5)	52.8 (11.6)	44.7 (7.1)	35.0 (1.7)	26.2 (−3.2)	17.5 (−8.1)	32.4 (0.2)
Mean minimum °F (°C)	−12.6 (−24.8)	−13.0 (−25.0)	−6.1 (−21.2)	14.4 (−9.8)	26.2 (−3.2)	36.1 (2.3)	41.8 (5.4)	40.3 (4.6)	30.9 (−0.6)	22.5 (−5.3)	11.6 (−11.3)	−3.2 (−19.6)	−17.5 (−27.5)
Record low °F (°C)	−37 (−38)	−41 (−41)	−37 (−38)	−11 (−24)	17 (−8)	24 (−4)	32 (0)	27 (−3)	20 (−7)	11 (−12)	−13 (−25)	−25 (−32)	−41 (−41)
Average precipitation inches (mm)	1.88 (48)	1.45 (37)	1.88 (48)	3.53 (90)	3.47 (88)	3.48 (88)	3.11 (79)	3.42 (87)	3.04 (77)	3.67 (93)	2.52 (64)	1.94 (49)	33.39 (848)
Average snowfall inches (cm)	18.7 (47)	13.9 (35)	9.4 (24)	5.2 (13)	0.3 (0.76)	0.0 (0.0)	0.0 (0.0)	0.0 (0.0)	0.0 (0.0)	1.4 (3.6)	9.0 (23)	16.1 (41)	74.0 (188)
Average extreme snow depth inches (cm)	11.1 (28)	12.9 (33)	11.8 (30)	2.6 (6.6)	0.2 (0.51)	0.0 (0.0)	0.0 (0.0)	0.0 (0.0)	0.0 (0.0)	0.6 (1.5)	3.7 (9.4)	8.3 (21)	15.4 (39)
Average precipitation days (≥ 0.01 in)	16.2	12.2	11.1	12.5	13.0	11.6	11.1	11.2	12.1	14.9	13.6	15.1	154.6
Average snowy days (≥ 0.1 in)	14.8	11.5	7.8	3.8	0.2	0.0	0.0	0.0	0.0	1.0	6.5	13.2	58.8
Source: NOAA

== Education ==
Lake City is served by the Lake City Area Schools district. High school students are served by Lake City High School.

== Transportation ==
=== Major highways ===
- M-55 is an east–west highway, traversing the Lower Peninsula from Manistee on Lake Michigan to Tawas City on Lake Huron. Other communities M-55 passes through include Cadillac, Houghton Lake, Prudenville, and West Branch.
- M-66 is a north–south highway, running from the Indiana border neat Sturgis to Charlevoix on Lake Michigan. The second-longest state trunkline highway in Michigan, M-66 passes through Battle Creek, Ionia, and the nearby communities of McBain and Kalkaska. North of Lake City, M-66 reaches a junction with M-42 which can be used to access Manton.

== Demographics ==
Historical population
Census	Pop.	Note	%±
1880	61		—
1890	663		986.9%
1900	816		23.1%
1910	740		−9.3%
1920	582		−21.4%
1930	610		4.8%
1940	693		13.6%
1950	719		3.8%
1960	718		−0.1%
1970	704		−1.9%
1980	843		19.7%
1990	858		1.8%
2000	923		7.6%
2010	836		−9.4%
2020	829		−0.8%
U.S. Decennial Census

=== 2010 census ===
As of the census of 2010, there were 836 people, 337 households, and 216 families living in the city. The population density was 796.2 inhabitants per square mile (307.4/km^{2}). There were 489 housing units at an average density of 465.7 per square mile (179.8/km^{2}). The racial makeup of the city was 95.2% White, 1.2% African American, 1.7% Native American, 0.7% Asian, and 1.2% from two or more races. Hispanic or Latino of any race were 2.9% of the population.

There were 337 households, of which 28.8% had children under the age of 18 living with them, 45.4% were married couples living together, 12.2% had a female householder with no husband present, 6.5% had a male householder with no wife present, and 35.9% were non-families. 32.0% of all households were made up of individuals, and 17% had someone living alone who was 65 years of age or older. The average household size was 2.35 and the average family size was 2.89.

The median age in the city was 40.5 years. 23.4% of residents were under the age of 18; 8.6% were between the ages of 18 and 24; 21.2% were from 25 to 44; 27.5% were from 45 to 64; and 19.3% were 65 years of age or older. The gender makeup of the city was 51.2% male and 48.8% female.

=== 2000 census ===
As of the census of 2000, there were 923 people, 381 households, and 238 families living in the city. The population density was 854.9 inhabitants per square mile (330.1/km^{2}). There were 493 housing units at an average density of 456.6 per square mile (176.3/km^{2}). The racial makeup of the city was 97.72% White, 0.11% African American, 0.43% Native American, 0.76% Asian, 0.43% from other races, and 0.54% from two or more races. Hispanic or Latino of any race were 1.63% of the population.

There were 381 households, out of which 29.1% had children under the age of 18 living with them, 46.7% were married couples living together, 12.9% had a female householder with no husband present, and 37.3% were non-families. 33.1% of all households were made up of individuals, and 15.7% had someone living alone who was 65 years of age or older. The average household size was 2.32 and the average family size was 2.93.

In the city, the population was spread out, with 24.1% under the age of 18, 9.6% from 18 to 24, 22.5% from 25 to 44, 23.6% from 45 to 64, and 20.2% who were 65 years of age or older. The median age was 41 years. For every 100 females, there were 89.9 males. For every 100 females age 18 and over, there were 86.4 males.

The median income for a household in the city was $28,864, and the median income for a family was $34,286. Males had a median income of $27,361 versus $19,044 for females. The per capita income for the city was $17,067. About 10.7% of families and 13.1% of the population were below the poverty line, including 13.7% of those under age 18 and 17.2% of those age 65 or over.

== Notable people ==
- Albert J. Engel, former politician
- Albert J. Engel Jr., former judge for the United States Court of Appeals for the Sixth Circuit
- Bruce Rendon, politician
- Daire Rendon, former Republican state representative Indicted for conspiracy for undue possession of a voting machine and false pretenses relating to 2020 election.
- Burt Reynolds, Oscar-nominated and Golden Globe award-winning actor, film and television star
- James Wieghart, former newspaper editor
