= Boon (surname) =

Boon is a surname that can be of Dutch, Old French or Chinese origin. The rather common Dutch name Boon (Dutch pronunciation: [boːn]) often represents a patronymic, where the given name Boon was a short form of Boudewijn, Bonifacius or Bonaventure. Alternatively, boon meaning "bean" in Dutch, it can have a metonymic or metaphorical origin, referring to someone growing or selling beans, or one of small stature, respectively. The English surname can be from an attested variant form of Bohon/Bohun, a family descending from a Norman knight.

Notable people with the surname include:

== A ==
- Alethea Boon (born 1984), Fiji-born New Zealand gymnast and weightlifter
- Alexis Boon, British police officer
- Amos Boon (born 1972), Singaporean football goalkeeper
- Anson Boon (born 2000), English actor

== C ==
- Charles Boon (1877–1943), English publisher
- Clint Boon (born 1959), English musician, DJ and radio presenter

== D ==
- D. Boon (1958–1985), American punk guitarist and singer of The Minutemen
- Dante Boon (born 1973), Dutch composer and pianist
- Dany Boon stage name of Daniel Hamidou (born 1966), French comedian
- David Boon (born 1960), Australian cricketer
- Dickie Boon (1878–1961), Canadian ice hockey forward and manager

== E ==
- Ed Boon (born 1964), American video game programmer; co-creator of Mortal Kombat
- Emilie Boon (born 1959), Dutch-born American children's book author and illustrator
- Eric Boon (1919–1981), English boxer

== G ==
- Gerrit Boon (1768–1821), Dutch agent of the Holland Land Company, settler of Boonville, New York

== H ==
- Hugh P. Boon (1831–1908), American Union soldier in the American Civil War

== I ==
- Ingrid Tieken-Boon van Ostade (born 1954), Dutch sociolinguist

== J ==
- Jaak Boon (born 1948), Belgian television writer
- Jan Boon (1911–1974), Dutch writer, journalist, and activist
- Jazz Boon, Hong Kong television producer, director, and writer
- Jill Boon (born 1987), Belgian field hockey player
- John D. Boon (1817–1864), American merchant and Oregon politician

== K ==
- Karel Boon (1909–1996), Dutch art historian and museum curator

== L ==
- Louis Paul Boon (1912–1979), Flemish novelist

== M ==
- Martin J. Boon (1840–1888), British trade unionist
- Mick Boon (1902–1988), New Zealand cricketer
- Mike Boon (born 1970), New Zealand stand-up comedian

== N ==
- Nika Boon, British singer-songwriter
- Nikki Boon (born 2001), Dutch heptathlete

== R ==
- Ratliff Boon (1781–1844), American politician, Governor of Indiana in 1822
- Robert Boon (1916–2015), Dutch-born American film, television, and theater actor
- Ronnie Boon (1909–1998), Welsh rugby player

== S ==
- Stuart Boon (1934–1989), English cricketer

== T ==
- Thierry Boon (born 1944), Belgian immunologist
- Tim Boon (born 1961), English cricketer
- Tom Boon (born 1990), Belgian field hockey player

== W ==
- William Boon (1911–1994), British chemist

== Van der Boon ==
- Anthony Hendrik van der Boon Mesch (1804–1874), Dutch chemist and University Dean
- Karla van der Boon (born 1968), Dutch water polo goalkeeper

== See also ==
- Boom (surname)
- Boone (surname)
