= Boon =

Boon may refer to:

== Arts, entertainment, and media ==
- Boon (game), a trick-taking card game
- Boon (novel), a 1915 satirical work by H. G. Wells
- Boon (TV series), a British television series starring Michael Elphick
- The Ultimate Boon, a stage in Joseph Campbell's hero's journey or monomyth
- Boon (film), a 2022 American direct to DVD film by Neal McDonough

== People ==
=== Surname ===
- Boon (surname), a list of people with the surname Boon

=== Given name ===
- Boon Gould (1955–2019), English lead guitarist of Level 42
- Boon Mark Gittisarn (1898–1987), Thai Protestant pastor
- Boon Thau Loo, Singaporean-American computer scientist
- Lim Boon Keng (1869–1957), Chinese doctor, social and educational reformer in China and Singapore

=== Fictional ===
- Marukubi Boon, an Osamu Tezuka stock character

== Places ==
=== North America ===
- Boon, Michigan, United States
  - Boon Township, Michigan
- Boon, Ontario, Canada
- Boon Island, Maine, United States
- Boon Point, Saint John, Antigua and Barbuda
- Boon Township, Indiana, United States
- Boon Lake Township, Minnesota, United States
- Boones Mill, Virginia, United States (originally known as Boon Mill)

=== Other ===
- Boon, Awdal, Somaliland
- Boon (Pontus), Turkey, a town of ancient Pontus
- Boon Farm, Scotland, United Kingdom

== Other uses ==
- Boon Brewery, a Belgian brewery
- Boon language, a nearly extinct East Cushitic language
- Daihatsu Boon, a Japanese subcompact hatchback

== See also ==
- Boone (disambiguation)
- Boom (disambiguation)
- Bon (disambiguation)
