= South Branch Township, Wexford County, Michigan =

South Branch Township, Michigan
- Civil township
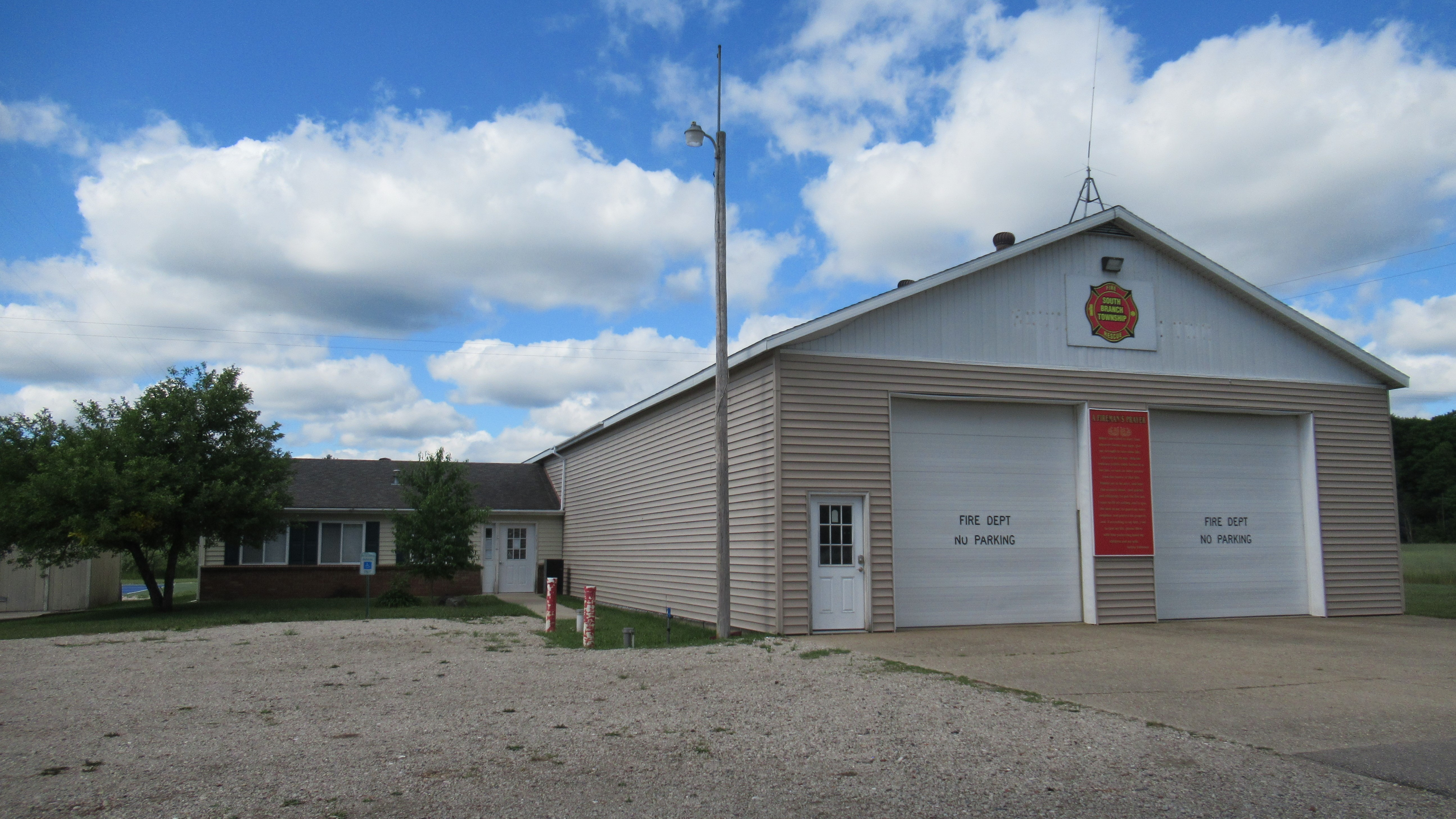
- South Branch Township Hall and Fire Department

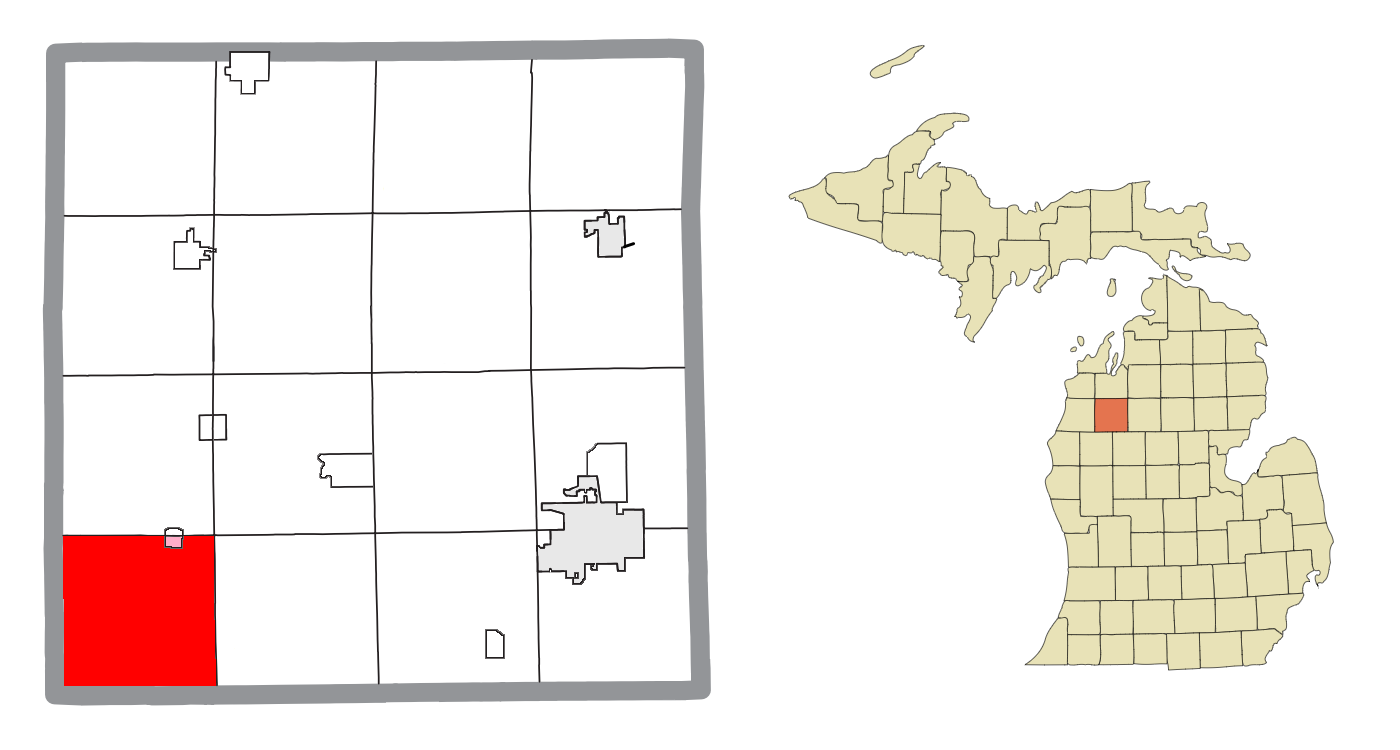
- Location within Wexford County (red) and a portion of the Caberfae CDP (pink)

- Location within the state of Michigan Location within the United States
- Coordinates: 44°12′48″N 85°45′41″W
- Country: United States
- State: Michigan
- County: Wexford

Government
  - Supervisor: Lori Goodrich
  - Clerk: Julie Ceislak

Area
  - Total: 36.05 sq mi (93.37 km^{2})
  - Land: 36.03 sq mi (93.32 km^{2})
  - Water: 0.019 sq mi (0.05 km^{2})
- Elevation: 1,180 ft (360 m)

Population (2020)
  - Total: 348
  - Density: 9.66/sq mi (3.73/km^{2})
- Time zone: UTC-5 (Eastern (EST))
  - Summer (DST): UTC-4 (EDT)
- ZIP code(s): 49601 (Cadillac); 49638 (Harrietta); 49644 (Irons); 49689 (Wellston)
- Area code: 231
- FIPS code: 26-74820
- GNIS feature ID: 1627094
- Website: https://southbranchtownshipwexfordmi.gov/

South Branch Township is a civil township of Wexford County of the U.S. state of Michigan. The population was 348 at the 2020 census.

== Communities ==
- Caberfae is an unincorporated community and census-designated place located in the northern portion of the township at 44°14′59″N 85°43′30″W. A portion of the CDP extends north into Slagle Township, but the majority of the CDP, including Caberfae Peaks Ski & Golf Resort, is located within South Branch Township.
- Garletts Corner is an unincorporated community located at the intersection of M-37 and M-55 at 44°13′21″N 85°48′23″W.
- Hoxeyville is an unincorporated community in the eastern portion of the township at 44°11′37″N 85°42′53″W. The community began as a lumbering settlement and given a post office named Clay Hill on July 20, 1870. It was renamed after resident John Hoxie on April 25, 1891.
- Thorp is a former settlement within the township. A brief rural post office opened on August 21, 1883.

== Geography ==
According to the U.S. Census Bureau, the township has a total area of 36.05 square miles (93.37 km^{2}), of which 36.03 square miles (93.32 km^{2}) is land and 0.02 square miles (0.05 km^{2}) (0.06%) is water.

The Caberfae Peaks Ski & Golf Resort is located within South Branch Township.

=== Major highways ===
- M-37 runs south–north through the western portion of the township.
- M-55 runs east–west through the center of the township and has an intersection with M-37.

== Demographics ==
As of the census of 2000, there were 330 people, 148 households, and 92 families residing in the township. The population density was 9.1 per square mile (3.5/km^{2}). There were 429 housing units at an average density of 11.9 per square mile (4.6/km^{2}). The racial makeup of the township was 98.18% White, 0.30% from other races, and 1.52% from two or more races. Hispanic or Latino of any race were 1.52% of the population.

There were 148 households, out of which 22.3% had children under the age of 18 living with them, 54.7% were married couples living together, 6.1% had a female householder with no husband present, and 37.8% were non-families. 32.4% of all households were made up of individuals, and 11.5% had someone living alone who was 65 years of age or older. The average household size was 2.23 and the average family size was 2.82.

In the township the population was spread out, with 21.5% under the age of 18, 4.8% from 18 to 24, 25.5% from 25 to 44, 26.1% from 45 to 64, and 22.1% who were 65 years of age or older. The median age was 44 years. For every 100 females, there were 108.9 males. For every 100 females age 18 and over, there were 108.9 males.

The median income for a household in the township was $31,667, and the median income for a family was $40,536. Males had a median income of $31,979 versus $19,375 for females. The per capita income for the township was $16,620. About 6.9% of families and 9.5% of the population were below the poverty line, including 13.0% of those under age 18 and 1.3% of those age 65 or over.

== Education ==
South Branch Township is served entirely by Cadillac Area Public Schools to the east in Cadillac.
