= Boone =

Boone may refer to:

== People ==
- Boone (surname)
- Boone Carlyle, a character from the Lost TV series
- Boone Helm (1828–1864), an American mountain man, gunfighter, and serial killer known as the Kentucky Cannibal
- Boone Jenner, an ice hockey forward
- Boone Logan, a baseball pitcher
- Boone Niederhofer, an American bobsledder

== Places in the United States ==
- Boone, Colorado
- Boone, Iowa
- Boone, Missouri
- Boone, Nebraska
- Boone, North Carolina
- Boone, Tennessee
- Boone, West Virginia
- Boone Grove, Indiana
- Boone Township (disambiguation)
- Boones Mill, Virginia
- Boonesboro, Missouri
- Boonesborough, Kentucky
- Booneville (disambiguation)
- Boone County (disambiguation)
- Boone River, Iowa

== Ships ==
- USS Boone (FFG-28)
- USS Boone County (LST-389)
- USS Daniel Boone (SSBN-629)

== Schools ==
- Boone County High School, Florence, Kentucky
- Boone’s University School, Berkeley, California: NRHP-listed
- Daniel Boone High School (disambiguation)
- William R. Boone High School, Orlando, Florida

== Other ==
- MiniBooNE, a physics experiment at Fermilab to detect neutrinos.
- Boone Hall, a southern plantation in Mount Pleasant, South Carolina
- Daniel Boone (TV series), a 1964–1970 NBC television series starring Fess Parker
- Boone, a 1983–1984 NBC television series starring Tom Byrd
- Denver Boone, or Boone the Pioneer, mascot of the University of Denver from 1968 to 1998

== See also ==
- Boon (disambiguation)
- Bone (disambiguation)
