= Cheryl Finley =

American visual artist (born 1964)

- Born: February 15, 1964 (age 62); Philadelphia, Pennsylvania, U.S.
- Education: Wellesley College (B.A.); Yale University (M.A.; PhD)
- Occupations: Art historian, author, curator and critic
- Notable work: Committed to Memory: The Art of the Slave Ship Icon (2018)

Cheryl Finley (born February 15, 1964) is an American art historian, author, curator and critic. She was a professor at Cornell University and Director of the AUC Art History + Curatorial Studies Collective. In 2019, she won Bard Graduate Center's Horowitz Book Prize for her book Committed to Memory: the Art of the Slave Ship Icon.

== Early life and education ==
Cheryl Finley was born on February 15, 1964, in Philadelphia, Pennsylvania, to Gail Tabourne Finley and Harold Eugene Finley, Jr.

Finley studied at Wellesley College, where in 1986 she received a B.A. degree in Spanish. She went on to earn an M.A. degree (1988) and then her PhD (2002) in Art History and African American studies from Yale University, where she co-founded the Photographic Memory Workshop in 1998 with Laura Wexler, Leigh Raiford and Robin Bernstein.

== Career ==
Finley began in the art world as an art appraiser specializing in photography. Until 2024, she was Associate Professor and Director of Visual Studies in the History of Art Department at Cornell University. In 2016, Finley helped organize and host Black Portraitures III with Deborah Willis, Awam Amkpa and Manthia Diawara in Johannesburg. This nomadic annual conference convenes artists and scholars to discuss imagery of the African Diaspora in visual culture. In 2017, she was a speaker at the 28th Annual James Porter Colloquium at Howard University along with Lorna Simpson, Fred Wilson, Dawoud Bey, Kinshasa Holman Conwill, and Kellie Jones. That same year, Finley spoke with Deborah Willis and Kellie Jones about Black social movements on a panel at the annual College Art Association's conference in New York.

In 2019, Finley took a leave of absence from her teaching job at Cornell University to become the inaugural Director of the Atlanta University Center Collective for the Study of Art History and Curatorial Studies. The Collective culls together students from Clark Atlanta, Morehouse, and Spelman to study curatorial and art historical practices, and is the only program in the US focused on training professionals of color in this field. In 2019, she was a panelist for Miami Art Basel's tenth annual Discussion on African Diaspora Art, along with Dr. Moyo Okediji, and Sopo Aluko.

Finley writes primarily about Black contemporary artists. Among her publications are monographs on the photographer Teenie Harris, on Terry Adkins, a book about the use of the slave ship image in art and culture, a pictorial book about Harlem, and most recently an exhibition catalog from the collection of Souls Grown Deep Foundation. In 2019, Finley won the Horowitz Book Prize from the Bard Graduate Center for her book Committed to Memory: The Art of the Slave Ship Icon. Finley has also contributed to Artforum and ARTnews.

In 2023, Finley became a member of the board of directors of the Menil Foundation, and in 2024, she joined the board of Creative Capital. On November 10, 2026, she was appointed to the board of the Andy Warhol Foundation for the Visual Arts.

== Bibliography ==
- Finley, Cheryl (contributor), Kalia Brooks Nelson, Deborah Willis, Ellyn Toscano (editors) (2019). "Lois Mailou Jones in the World", Women and Migration: Responses in Art and History. Open Book Publishers. ISBN 9781783745685.
- Finley, Cheryl, Randall R. Griffey, Amelia Peck, Darryl Pinckney (2018). My Soul Has Grown Deep: Black Art from the American South. Metropolitan Museum of Art. ISBN 9781588396099.
- Finley, Cheryl (2018). Committed to Memory: the Art of the Slave Ship Icon. Princeton University Press. ISBN 9780691136844.
- Finley, Cheryl, Ian Berry, Anthony Elms, Okwui Enwezor, Charles Gaines (2017). Terry Adkins: Recital. Prestel. ISBN 9783791352756.
- Finley, Cheryl, Laurence A. Glasco, Joe W. Trotter (2011). Teenie Harris, Photographer: Image, Memory, History. University of Pittsburgh Press. ISBN 9780822961741.
- Finley, Cheryl, Deborah Willis, Elizabeth Alexander, Thelma Golden (2010). Harlem: A Century in Images. Skira Rizzoli. ISBN 9780847833351.
- Finley, Cheryl, Salah M. Hassan (2008). Diaspora Memory Place: David Hammons, Maria Magdalena Campos-pons, Pamela Z. Prestel Pub. ISBN 9783791339139.
- Finley, Cheryl, Solange Oliviera Farkas, Zita Nunes, et al. (2005). Mostra Pan Africana de Arte Contemporanea / Pan-African Exhibition of Contemporary Art. Associacao Cultural Videobrasil. ASIN: B005MKQ67E.
- Finley, Cheryl (2002). James VanDerZee: Harlem Guaranteed. Michael Rosenfeld Gallery. ASIN: B00I9OL5I0.
- Finley, Cheryl, Daniell Cornell (2000). Imaging African Art: Documentation and Transformation. Yale University Art Gallery. ISBN 9780894670916.
- Finley, Cheryl, Nell Andrew, Adam Jolles, Ann Vollmann Bible, et al. (1999). "Tracing Memory", Chicago Art Journal, Spring 1999. University of Chicago. ASIN: B00E7VKR2E.
- Finley, Cheryl, William Barlow (1994). From Swing to Soul: An Illustrated History of African American Popular Music from 1930 to 1960. Elliott & Clark Pub. ISBN 9781880216187.

== Awards ==
- 1998: Sylvia Ardyn Boone Prize from Yale University
- 2019: Bard Graduate Center's Horowitz Book Prize for Committed to Memory: The Art of the Slave Ship Icon
- 2019: Historians of British Art Book Prize
- 2023: James A. Porter Book Prize from Howard University
