= Boone micropolitan area =

The Boone micropolitan area may refer to:

- The Boone, Iowa micropolitan area, United States
- The Boone, North Carolina micropolitan area, United States

== See also ==
- Boone (disambiguation)
