= Daniel Boone (disambiguation) =

Daniel Boone (1734–1820) was an American pioneer and hunter whose frontier exploits made him one of the first folk heroes of the United States.

Daniel Boone or Dan Boone may also refer to:

== People ==
- Daniel Boone (MP), British Member of Parliament for Grampound, Ludgershall, Minehead and Stockbridge in 1741
- Daniel Morgan Boone (1769–1839), son of Daniel Boone, American pioneer, explorer, and frontiersman important in the history of Missouri
- Alfred M. Boone (1893–1961), American college football and college baseball player, athletics administrator, and insurance executive
- Dan Boone (baseball) (1895–1968), Major League Baseball pitcher
- Daniel Boone (singer) (1942–2023), English pop musician
- Danny Boone (born 1954), Major League Baseball pitcher
- Dany Boon (born 1966), French comedian and filmmaker
- Dan Boone (minister) (fl. 2000s), Nazarene minister, author, and university president

== Media ==
- Daniel Boone (1907 film), a film by Edwin S. Porter
- In the Days of Daniel Boone or Daniel Boone, a 1923 film by William James Craft
- Daniel Boone (1936 film), an American film by David Howard starring George O'Brien
- Daniel Boone, Trail Blazer, a 1956 film starring Bruce Bennett
- Daniel Boone (1960 TV series), an ABC television miniseries that aired on Walt Disney Presents
- Daniel Boone (1964 TV series), an NBC television series starring Fess Parker
- Daniel Boone: Frontier Trail Rider, a 1966 film by George Sherman
- Daniel Boone (book), a 1940 book by James Daugherty

== Military ==
- USS Daniel Boone (SSBN-629), a U.S. Navy ballistic missile submarine
- Operation Daniel Boone, a military operation during the Vietnam war

== Places ==
- Daniel Boone, Kentucky
- Daniel Boone Arboretum, Tennessee
- Daniel Boone National Forest, Kentucky
- Daniel Boone Corridor, a proposed light rail route in St. Louis

== Buildings ==
- Daniel Boone Hotel (Boone, North Carolina)
- Daniel Boone Hotel (Charleston, West Virginia)
- Daniel Boone School, Pennsylvania
- Daniel Boone Bridge, spanning the Missouri River

== Schools ==
- Daniel Boone Area High School, Pennsylvania
- Daniel Boone High School (Tennessee)

== See also ==
- Boone (disambiguation)
- Davy Crockett (1786–1836), American frontiersman sometimes confused with Daniel Boone
