= Boone (surname) =

Boone is a Dutch and English surname, from the Middle Dutch bone or boene meaning 'bean' or 'someone who farmed beans'. It is found in the United States more than any other country in the world, and found in Belgium more than any other country in Europe. Notable people with the surname include:

- Aaron Boone (born 1973), American baseball player and manager
- Bob Boone (born 1947), baseball player, coach and manager
- Benson Boone (born 2002), American singer-songwriter
- Brendon Boone, American actor and writer
- Bret Boone (born 1969), baseball player
- Daniel Boone (disambiguation), multiple people
- David Boone (1951–2005), Canadian football player
- David Sheldon Boone (born 1952), American-born Soviet spy
- Debby Boone (born 1956), singer and daughter of Pat
- Eunetta T. Boone (1955–2019), American television writer and producer
- Fernand Boone (1934–2013), Belgian footballer
- Herman Boone (1935–2019), American football coach
- Ilsley Boone (1879–1968), former head of the first naturist organization in the U.S.
- Jack Boone (1918–1984), American college sports coach
- Joel Thompson Boone (1889–1974), World War I Medal of Honor recipient
- John William Boone (1864–1927), American ragtime musician
- Josh Boone (born 1984), basketball player
- Laurence Boone (born 1969), French economist
- Levi Boone (1808–1882), Daniel's nephew and a mayor of Chicago in the 1850s
- Mark Boone Junior (born 1955), American actor
- Megan Boone (born 1983), American actress
- Mike Boone (born 1995), American football player
- Pat Boone (born 1934), American singer, actor and writer
- Pat Boone (politician), American rancher and politician in New Mexico
- Pete Boone, athletics director for the University of Mississippi
- Randy Boone (1942–2025), American actor and singer
- Richard Boone (1917–1981), American actor
- Richard B. Boone (1930–1999), American jazz musician
- Ron Boone (born 1946), basketball player
- Squire Boone (1744–1815), Daniel's brother and an important figure in American history
- Sylvia Ardyn Boone (1941–1993), American art historian
- Walker Boone (1944–2021), Canadian actor
