= Caberfae, Michigan =

- Census-designated place (CDP) & unincorporated community
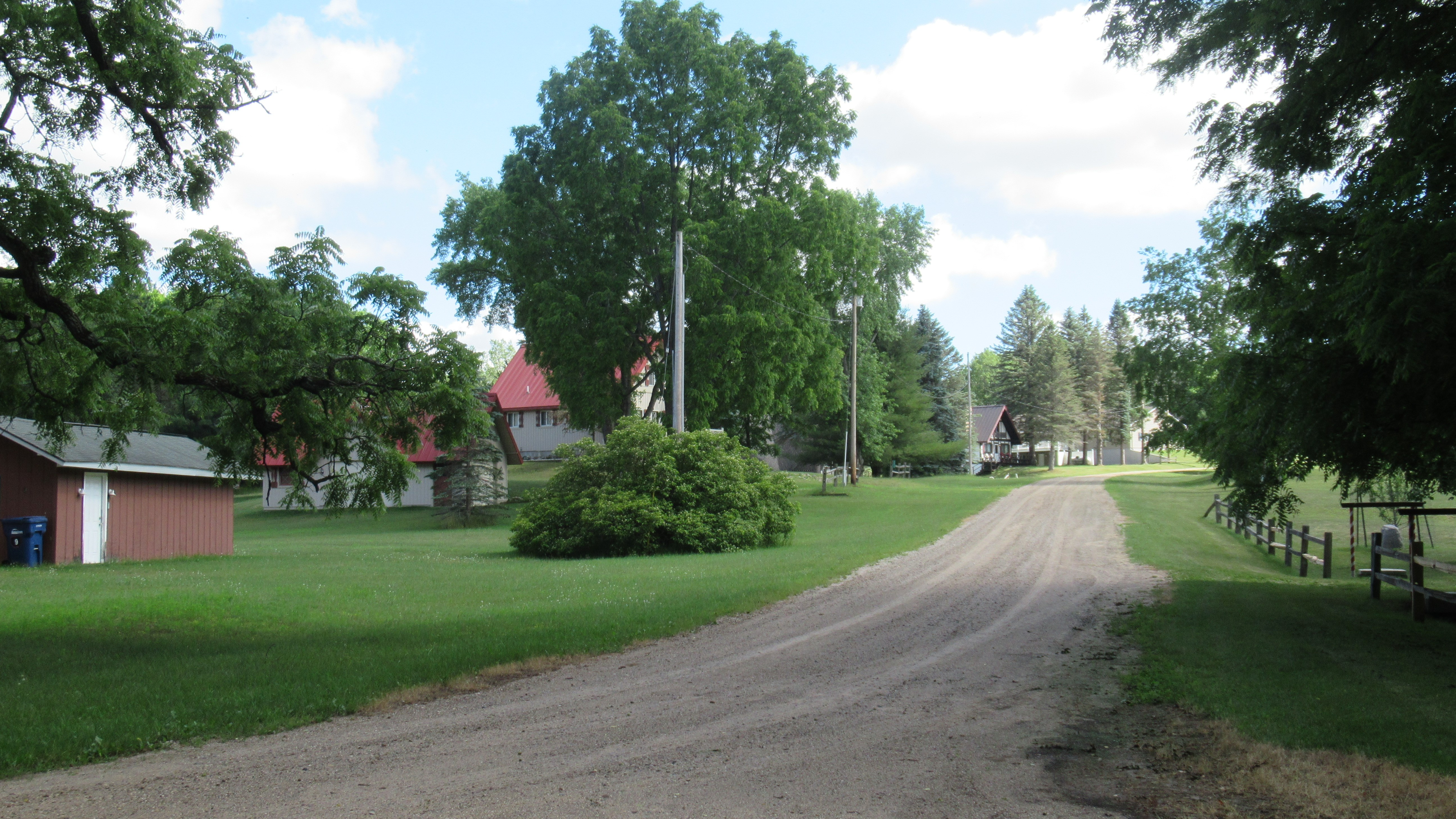
- Looking south along Dogwood Drive

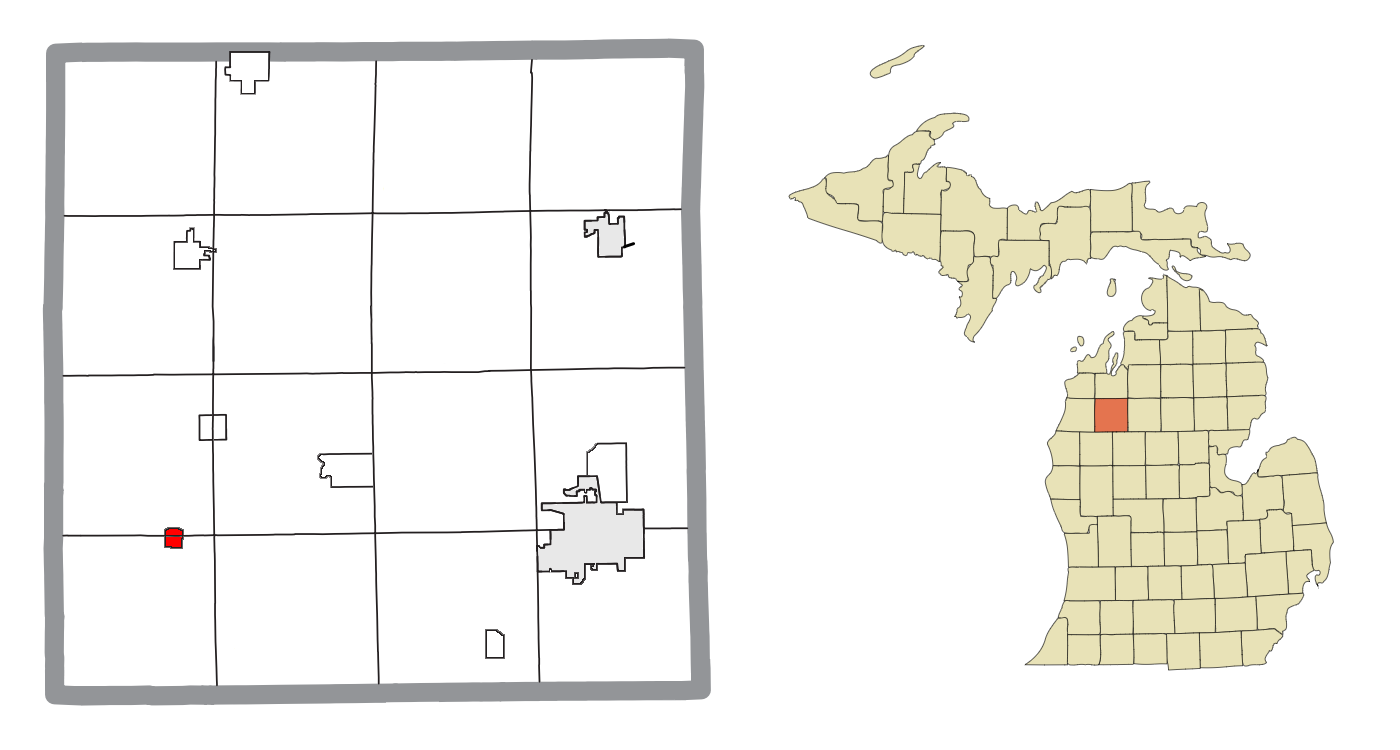
- Location within Wexford County

- Location within the state of Michigan Location within the United States
- Coordinates: 44°14′59″N 85°43′30″W
- Country: United States
- State: Michigan
- County: Wexford
- Townships: Slagle and South Branch

Area
  - Total: 0.44 sq mi (1.15 km^{2})
  - Land: 0.44 sq mi (1.15 km^{2})
  - Water: 0 sq mi (0.00 km^{2})
- Elevation: 1,175 ft (358 m)

Population (2020)
  - Total: 72
  - Density: 162.8/sq mi (62.87/km^{2})
- Time zone: UTC-5 (Eastern (EST))
  - Summer (DST): UTC-4 (EDT)
- ZIP code(s): 49601 (Cadillac)
- Area code: 231
- GNIS feature ID: 2583725

Caberfae (/ˈkæbərˌfeɪ/ KAB-ər-fay) is an unincorporated community and census-designated place (CDP) in Wexford County in the U.S. state of Michigan. The community is located within Slagle Township to the north and South Branch Township to the south. The population of the CDP was 72 at the 2020 census.

== History ==
Caberfae was named by Kenneth MacKenzie after the Scottish Gaelic term "cabar-fèidh", meaning "antler". The community served as the Caberfae Ranch, a private hunting club that was eventually sold to the United States during the Great Depression. It became part of the Manistee National Forest. It is now home to the Caberfae Peaks Ski & Golf Resort, a mix of government-owned and private property.

The community of Caberfae was listed as a newly organized census-designated place for the 2010 census, meaning it now has officially defined boundaries and population statistics for the first time.

== Geography ==
According to the U.S. Census Bureau, the community has an area of 0.44 square miles (1.14 km^{2}), all land.

== Demographics ==
As of recent estimates, Caberfae has about 64 residents, a sharp decline from 72 in 2020 — making it one of the smallest census-designated places in Michigan. Its median age is 63.5 years, far higher than average — indicating an older population overall. The residents are overwhelmingly White and U.S.-born, with 100% identifying as non-Hispanic White and 100% citizens.

Economically, the community shows modest but stable conditions: median household income is around $58,000, and per-capita income about $41,252. The poverty rate remains low at just over 3%, well below state and national levels. Homeownership is universal: virtually all housing units are owner-occupied, and the median property value is about $160,700.

Historical population
Census	Pop.	Note	%±
2010	64		—
2020	72		12.5%
U.S. Decennial Census

== Education ==
Education in Caberfae is shaped by its small population and rural setting, with no schools located within the community itself. Caberfae is served entirely by Cadillac Area Public Schools to the southeast in the city of Cadillac.

The district operates Cadillac High School, Mackinaw Trail Middle School, and multiple elementary schools.
