= Slagle Township, Michigan =

- Civil township
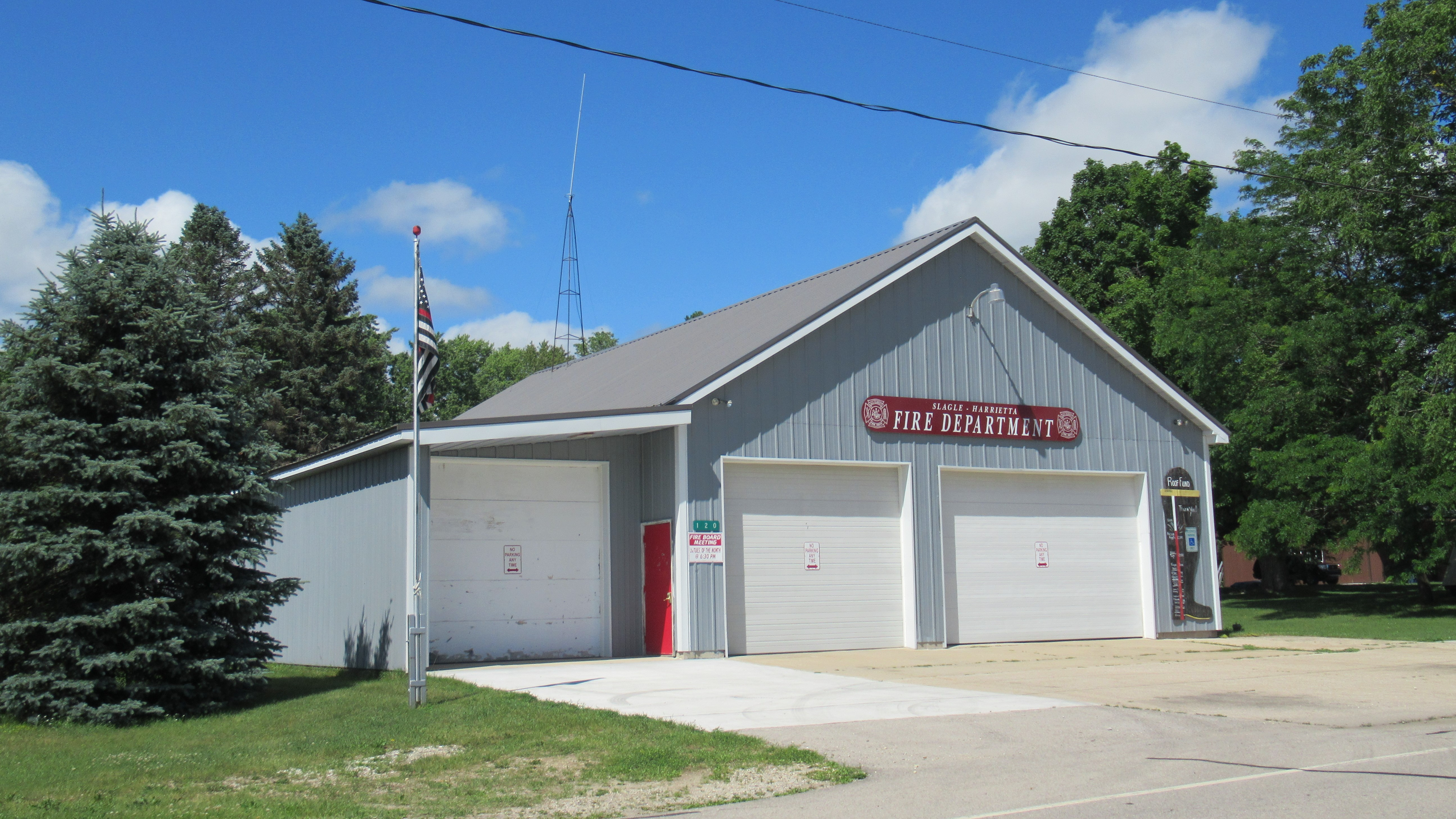
- Slagle–Harrietta Fire Department

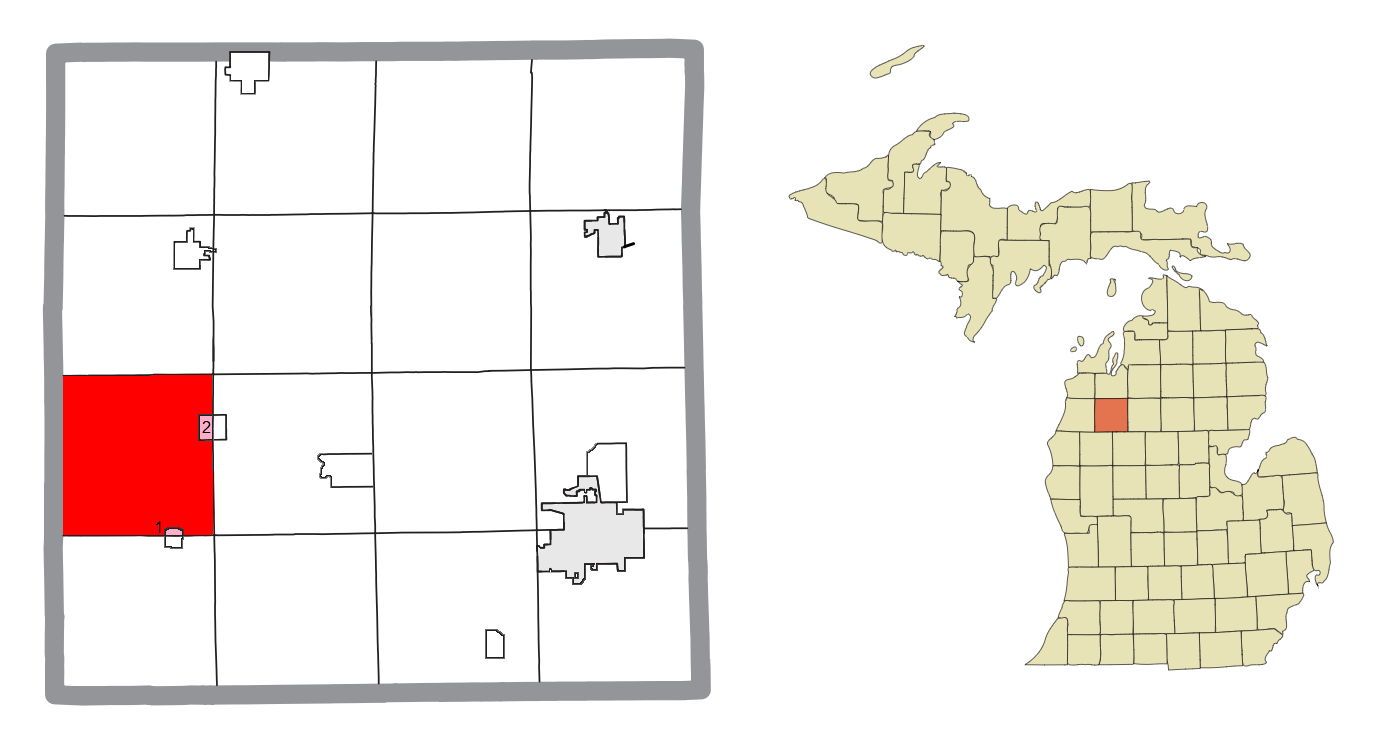
- Location within Wexford County and portions of the Caberfae CDP (1) and village of Harrietta (2)

- Location within the state of Michigan Location within the United States
- Coordinates: 44°17′47″N 85°45′44″W
- Country: United States
- State: Michigan
- County: Wexford

Government
  - Supervisor: Thomas Mannor
  - Clerk: Tammy Porterfield

Area
  - Total: 35.79 sq mi (92.70 km^{2})
  - Land: 35.79 sq mi (92.70 km^{2})
  - Water: 0 sq mi (0.00 km^{2})
- Elevation: 1,010 ft (308 m)

Population (2020)
  - Total: 509
  - Density: 14.2/sq mi (5.49/km^{2})
- Time zone: UTC-5 (Eastern (EST))
  - Summer (DST): UTC-4 (EDT)
- ZIP code(s): 49601 (Cadillac); 49638 (Harrietta); 49668 (Mesick)
- Area code: 231
- FIPS code: 26-74220
- GNIS feature ID: 1627086
- Website: https://slagletownship.org/

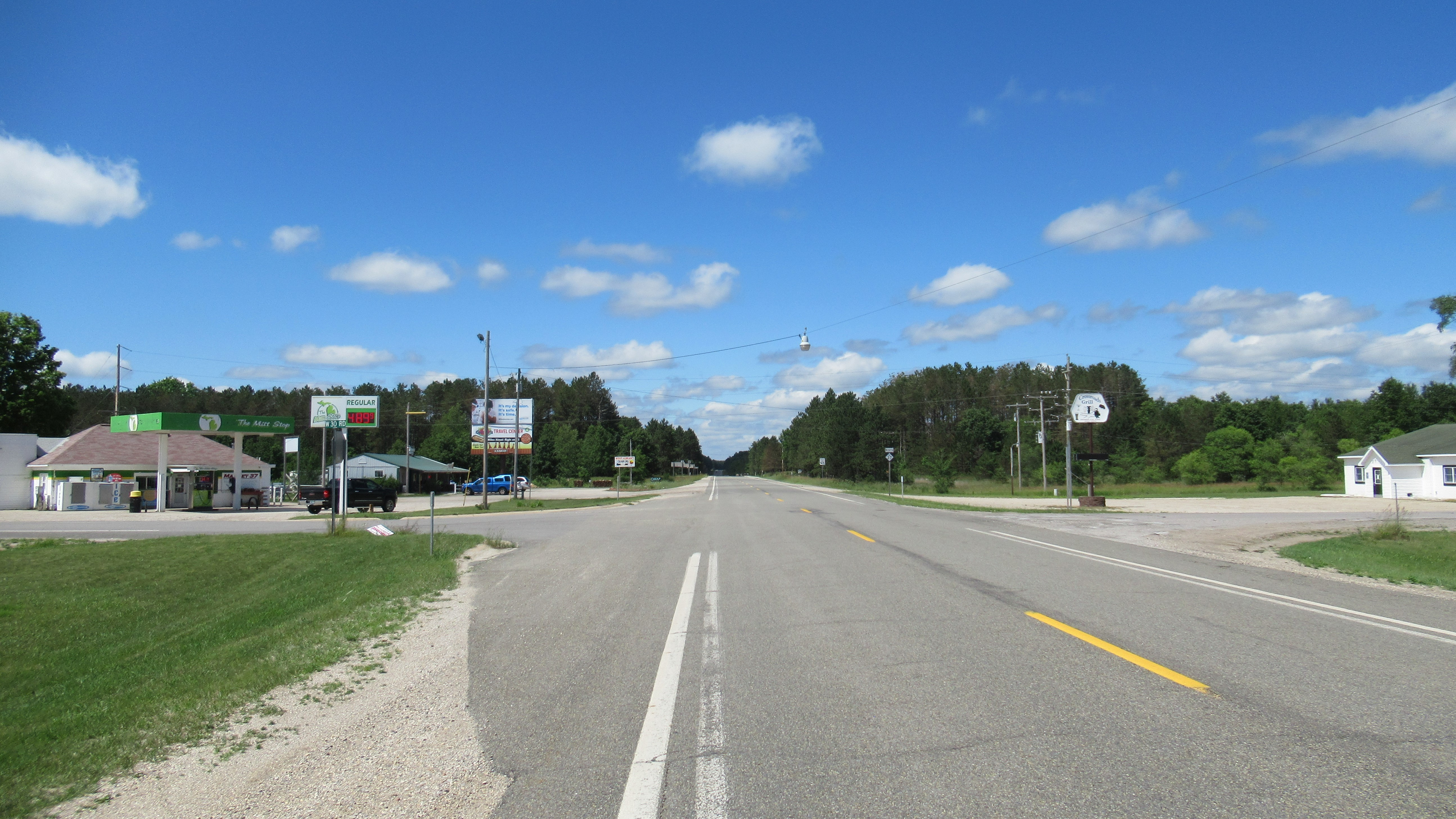
Looking north along M-37 at W. 30 Road

Slagle Township is a civil township of Wexford County in the U.S. state of Michigan. The population was 509 at the 2020 census.

== Communities ==
- Caberfae is an unincorporated community and census-designated place (CDP) partially located within the township. Most of the CDP and its population are within South Branch Township to the south.
- Harrietta is a village partially located within the township. The majority of the village is located within Boon Township to the east.

== Geography ==
According to the U.S. Census Bureau, the township has a total area of 35.79 square miles (92.70 km^{2}), all land.

=== Major highways ===
- M-37 runs south–north through the center of the township.

== Demographics ==
As of the census of 2000, there were 569 people, 225 households, and 166 families residing in the township. The population density was 15.9 per square mile (6.1/km^{2}). There were 391 housing units at an average density of 10.9 per square mile (4.2/km^{2}). The racial makeup of the township was 98.77% White, 0.88% Native American, and 0.35% from two or more races.

There were 225 households, out of which 27.6% had children under the age of 18 living with them, 62.7% were married couples living together, 7.1% had a female householder with no husband present, and 25.8% were non-families. 20.0% of all households were made up of individuals, and 10.7% had someone living alone who was 65 years of age or older. The average household size was 2.53 and the average family size was 2.86.

In the township the population was spread out, with 24.1% under the age of 18, 4.7% from 18 to 24, 26.4% from 25 to 44, 25.8% from 45 to 64, and 19.0% who were 65 years of age or older. The median age was 43 years. For every 100 females, there were 101.1 males. For every 100 females age 18 and over, there were 96.4 males.

The median income for a household in the township was $29,250, and the median income for a family was $33,036. Males had a median income of $28,750 versus $26,500 for females. The per capita income for the township was $14,069. About 12.7% of families and 17.2% of the population were below the poverty line, including 25.6% of those under age 18 and 18.8% of those age 65 or over.

== Education ==
Slagle Township is served by two public school districts. The majority of the township is served by Mesick Consolidated Schools to the north in Mesick, while the eastern portion of the township is served by Cadillac Area Public Schools to the east in Cadillac.
