= Ellyn Toscano =

Arts administrator, curator and author

- Education: New York University School of Law (LLM)
- Occupations: Arts administrator, curator and author
- Organizations: Villa La Pietra; Hawrhornden Foundatiion
- Notable work: Women and Migration: Responses in Art and History

Ellyn Toscano is an arts administrator, curator and author who serves as executive director of the Hawthornden Foundation, an American organisation supporting contemporary writers and the literary arts, particularly through international residency programs in Scotland, Italy, and Brooklyn. She co-edited the two-volume series Women and Migration: Responses in Art and History.

Toscano holds an LLM degree in International Law from New York University School of Law.

She served for two decades as Chief of Staff to US Congressman José Serrano of New York, directing his work on the House Appropriations Committee, and she was also Counsel to the New York State Assembly Committee on Education for nine years.

Toscano subsequently worked for 18 years for New York University, including as Executive Director of NYU Florence, where from 2004, she was the director of Villa La Pietra. Her initiatives there included founding a summer festival in the Villa's gardens and a year-long series of conferences, talks and exhibitions.

She was co-organizer of the Black Portraitures conference at NYU Florence and also produced the exhibition ReSignifications, held at three venues in Florence.

== Bibliography ==
- Co-editor (with Deborah Willis and Kalia Brooks Nelson, Women and Migration: Responses in Art and History, 2019.
- Co-editor (with Kalia Brooks, Cheryl Finley and Deborah Willis), Women and Migration(s) II, 2022.
- Co-editor (with Michael DiNiscia), Civility Unbound: Contesting a Democratic Value, NYU Press, 2026.
