= Trevecca Nazarene University =

Private university in Nashville, Tennessee, US

- Seal of Trevecca Nazarene University
- Former names: Literary and Bible Training School for Christian Workers (1901–1911), Trevecca College (1911–1934), Trevecca Nazarene College (1934–1995)
- Motto: Esse quam videri
- Motto in English: "To be, rather than to seem"
- Type: Private
- Established: 1901; 125 years ago
- Religious affiliation: Nazarene
- Academic affiliations: CCCU, SACS
- Endowment: $72.1 million (2024)
- President: Dan Boone
- Students: 3,196 (fall 2023)
- Undergraduates: 1,825 (fall 2023)
- Postgraduates: 1,371 (fall 2023)
- Location: Nashville, Tennessee, United States; 36.1427°N 86.7531°W
- Campus: Urban
- Colors: Purple & white
- Nickname: Trojans
- Sporting affiliations: NCAA Division II (Gulf South)
- Mascot: Troy Trevecca
- Website: trevecca.edu
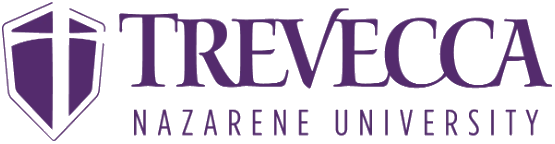

Trevecca Nazarene University (TNU) is a private Nazarene liberal arts college in Nashville, Tennessee. It was founded in 1901.

== History ==
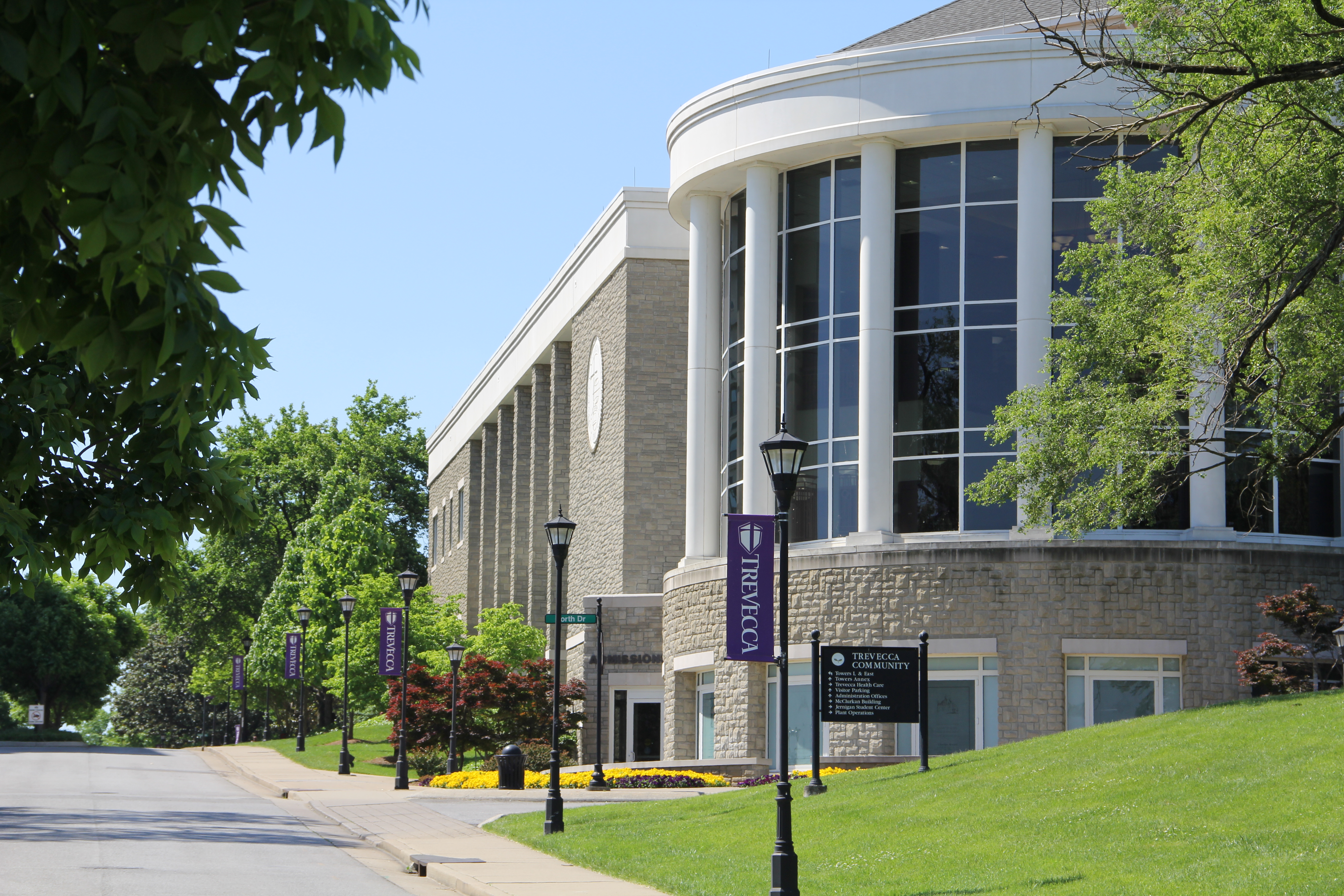
The Waggoner Library

TNU was founded in 1901 by Cumberland Presbyterian minister J. O. McClurkan as the "Pentecostal Literary and Bible Training School". Part of the Pentecostal Alliance, it started offering bachelor's degrees in 1910, and the school's name was changed to Trevecca College for Christian Workers in 1911, after Trevecca College (now Coleg Trefeca) in Wales. The school was located in downtown Nashville until 1914, when it was moved to East Nashville on Gallatin Road. In 1917, the campus suffered a disastrous fire, and its students and faculty temporarily transferred to Ruskin Cave College. That same year, the school became an official college of the Church of the Nazarene, in order to save itself financially. Shortly after it had become a Nazarene institution, it absorbed the Southeastern Nazarene College of Georgia but still found itself in bankruptcy and forced to sell its campus by 1932.

After occupying a temporary space on the former campus of the defunct Walden University on White's Creek, it was unable to buy the property and relocated to the Nashville First Church of the Nazarene, taking on the name Trevecca Nazarene College (TNC) in 1934. In 1935, the college moved back to its present location on Murfreesboro Pike in southeast Nashville, where it once again leased and then took over the 7-acre campus of Walden University in 1937. President A. B. Mackey bought an adjoining 40-acre (160,000 m^{2}) plot for himself and later transferred it to the college. It was first accredited in 1969 and began offering master's degrees in 1984. In 1995, the school's name was changed from Trevecca Nazarene College to Trevecca Nazarene University (TNU). In 1999, Trevecca offered its first doctoral degree (an Ed.D.), and in 2011, added its first Ph.D. degree (in clinical counseling).

On March 24, 2017, Trevecca announced a partnership with Eastern Nazarene College in Quincy, Massachusetts. At that time, Trevecca's president, Dan Boone, was also announced as president-elect of Eastern Nazarene College. In March 2017, the boards of trustees of both institutions voted to approve a Memorandum of Understanding that would begin a three-year partnership exploring the possibility of an eventual merger. As the president of both institutions, Boone was to provide leadership and oversight for both Trevecca and ENC. Both were to retain separate boards of governance and continue to operate as independent institutions under their respective accrediting bodies. In March 2018, the proposed merger was called off.

Trevecca's Presidents: J. O. MCClurkan (1901–1914), Dr. C. E. Hardy (1915–1919, 1920–1925, 1928–1936), Stephen S. White (1919–1920), John T. Benson (1925–1926), A. O. Hendricks (1926–1928), A.B. Mackey (1936–1963), W. M. Greathouse (1963–1968), Mark R. Moore (1968–1979), Homer J. Adams (1979–1991), Millard C. Reed (1991–2005), Dan Boone (2005–Present)

== Affiliation ==
TNU is one of eight U.S. liberal arts colleges affiliated with the Church of the Nazarene. TNU is the college for the "Southeast Region" of the United States, comprising the Kentucky, MidSouth, East Tennessee, Alabama North, Alabama South, North Carolina, South Carolina, Georgia, Florida, and Southern Florida districts, which include Tennessee, North Carolina, South Carolina, Mississippi, Alabama, Georgia, Florida, and part of Kentucky. Each college receives financial backing from the Nazarene churches in its region; part of each church budget is paid into a fund for its regional school. Each college or university is also bound by a gentlemen's agreement not to physically recruit outside its respective "educational region." TNU has been accredited by the Southern Association of Colleges and Schools since 1969.

== Campus ==
Trevecca has a 90+-acre campus in an urban neighborhood environment, located 1.7 miles southeast of downtown Nashville. The campus of Trevecca Nazarene University is part of the Trevecca Community, which includes other entities that are adjacent to the campus: Trevecca Community Church of the Nazarene; Trevecca Towers, a Christian retirement community; and Trevecca Center for Rehabilitation and Healing, a nursing home/long-term care facility.

== Academics ==
Trevecca is organized into eight schools: the School of Arts and Social Sciences, the Skinner School of Business, the School of Education, the School of Leadership and Interdisciplinary Studies, the Millard Reed School of Theology and Christian Ministry, the School of Music and Worship Arts, the School of STEM & Health Sciences, and the School of Graduate and Continuing Studies. Each of these schools is divided into departments. Most of the degrees offered by TNU are for traditional undergraduates; however, Trevecca offers 81 baccalaureate majors, 20 associate degree majors, 25 master's degrees, three doctorates, and six certificate programs. The management and human relations degree is a non-traditional undergraduate degree for working adults. Programs for associate degrees, the master's degrees, a doctor of philosophy degree, and a doctor of education degree are also available.

== Student life ==
There were 3,000-plus students at the college in fall 2023, 1,374 of whom were traditional undergraduates. The undergraduate population has a 1:1.56 male to female ratio, as of fall 2023. As of the spring of 2025, undergraduates represented 47 states, 39 countries, and 28 religious affiliations. The majority of undergraduate students live on campus in residence halls or apartment-style housing.

Students participate in spiritual life activities throughout the school year and summers, including chapels three times a week (a number of which each semester are required for all undergraduates), local community service projects, mission trips both in the U.S. and around the world, small groups (each designed for specific types of spiritual growth and learning), and other spiritually formational activities.

Trevecca has organizations such as the Student Government Association that are in charge of planning and hosting many social life events. Events that have gained the most popularity among the student body include "Friday Night Live" (a rendition of the popular skit show Saturday Night Live), "Trojan Idol" (a rendition of the popular singing show American Idol), and the Songwriter's Challenge.

In addition to SGA, TNU has a large number of student organizations and groups, including ministry-related clubs, service organizations, political and social interest clubs, and clubs or ensembles for many individual majors.

Trevecca has cooperative agreements with other local universities for programs not available directly through Trevecca, including the Army ROTC at Vanderbilt University, which offers a commission in the Army as well as a degree from Trevecca once the bachelor's program at TNU and the ROTC program at Vanderbilt are both successfully completed. Trevecca and Vanderbilt also have a joint program allowing students interested in marching band to participate in the Vandy band during Vanderbilt's football season. Through a 3-2 program with Vanderbilt University, students can obtain an applied physics degree at Trevecca. After completion of the program's requirements (usually three years at Trevecca and one at Vanderbilt), Trevecca will award the student an applied physics degree. Upon completion of the requirements in the student's chosen engineering discipline at Vanderbilt, that institution will award the student an engineering degree.

=== Athletics ===
Trevecca Nazarene is a member of NCAA Division II and primarily competes in the Gulf South Conference (GSC) since the 2024–25 academic year. They were previously a member of the Great Midwest Athletic Conference from 2012–2013 to 2023–2024 as well as the TranSouth Athletic Conference of the NAIA from 1996–1997 to 2011–2012. They compete in baseball, softball, STUNT, and women's volleyball as well as men's and women's teams in each of these sports basketball, golf, soccer, cross country, and track.

Some notable athletic accomplishments include the Trojan women's basketball team reaching the NAIA Championship game in 2008. The 2021 Trojan baseball team reached the NCAA Division II College World Series in Cary, North Carolina. The 1987 men's basketball team was the first TNU team to reach a national tournament. They advanced to the Elite Eight at the NAIA National Championships at Kemper Arena in Kansas City, Missouri. The 2015–2016 Women's Volleyball team won the GMAC Championship, beating #1 Cedarville University.

In addition to intercollegiate sports, Trevecca fields a cheerleading and an ultimate team and supports a variety of intramural sports, including flag football, softball, and beach volleyball.

== Notable alumni ==
=== Academic Officials ===
- Dan Boone, president of Trevecca Nazarene University

=== Religion ===
- William M. Greathouse, general superintendent emeritus in the Church of the Nazarene
- Jesse Middendorf, general superintendent emeritus in the Church of the Nazarene
- Nina Gunter, general superintendent emeritus in the Church of the Nazarene
- R.T. Kendall, Christian writer, speaker, pastor/teacher, and senior minister at Westminster Chapel in London

=== Others ===
- Kevin Dyson, former NFL player
- Wes Hampton, Grammy Award-winning American gospel singer, tenor for the Gaither Vocal Band.
- James Austin Johnson, cast member for SNL
- Stipe Miocic, professional mixed martial arts fighter, former UFC heavyweight champion
- Chonda Pierce, comedian
- Abner Ramirez, part of the duo Johnnyswim
