= Boonville =

Boonville may refer to:

== Places in the United States ==
- Boonville, California
- Boonville, Indiana
- Boonville, Missouri
  - Boonville Township, Cooper County, Missouri
- Boonville (town), New York
  - Boonville (village), New York, within the town of Boonville
- Boonville, North Carolina
- Boonville, Texas

== Other uses ==
- Boonville (novel), by Robert Mailer Anderson, set in Boonville, California

== See also ==
- Booneville (disambiguation)
