= Harrietta, Michigan =

- Village
- Village of Harrietta
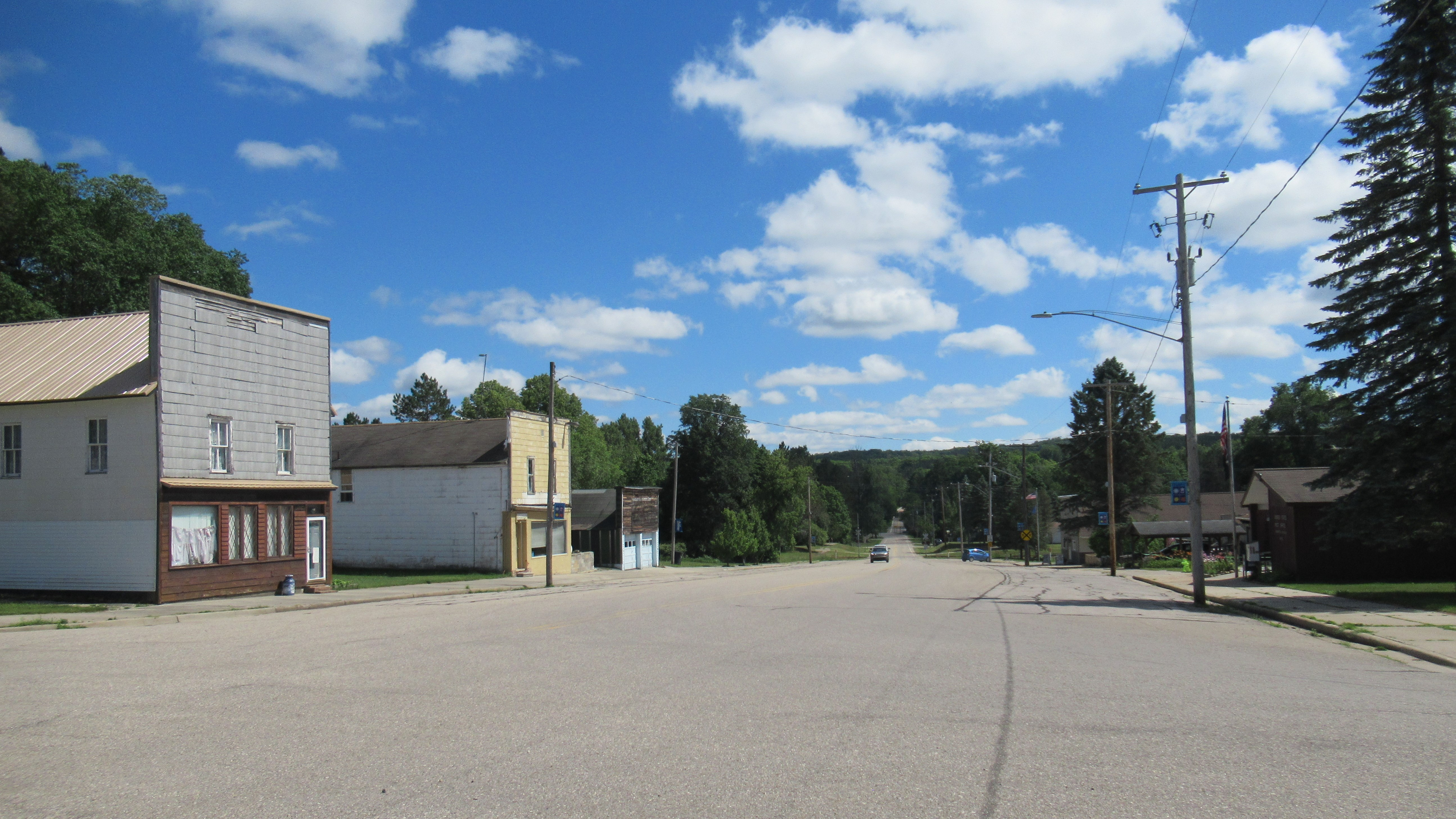
- Looking south along Davis Avenue

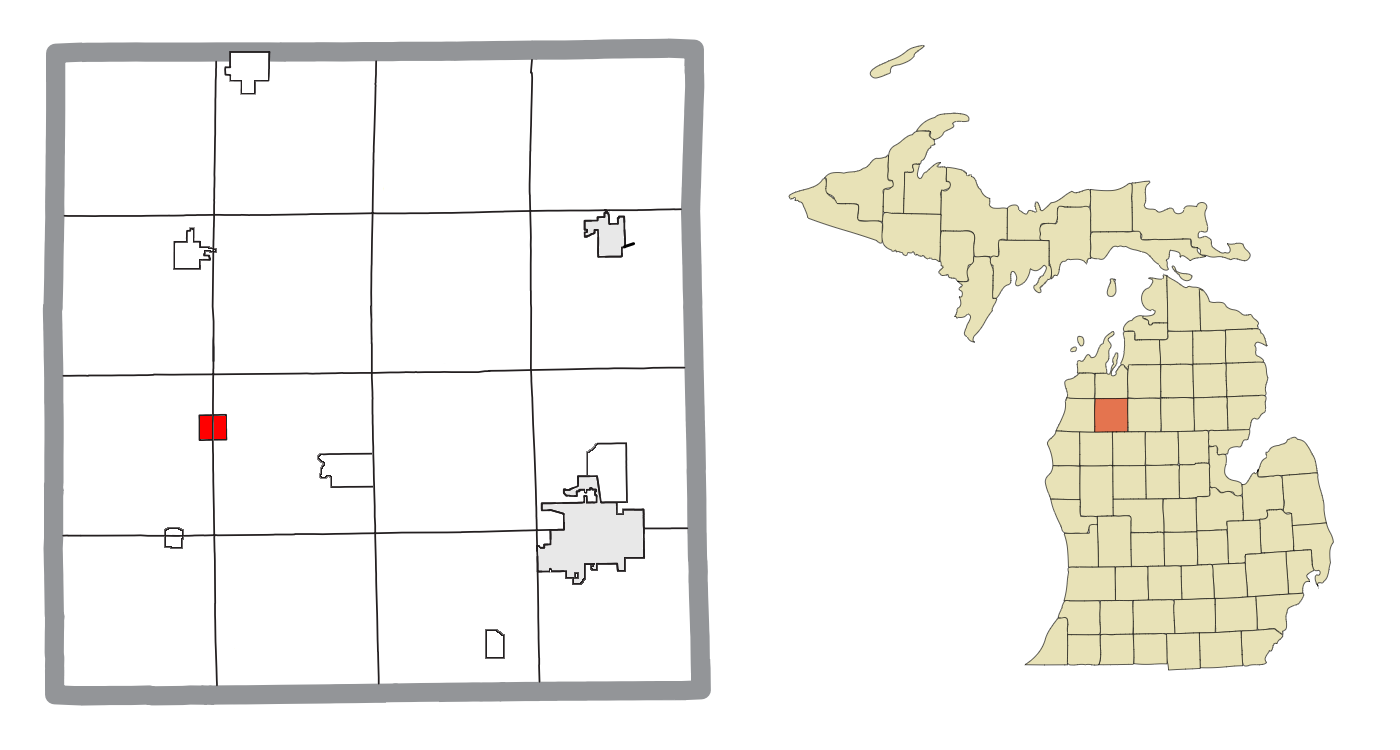
- Location within Wexford County

- Location within the state of Michigan Location within the United States
- Coordinates: 44°18′30″N 85°41′57″W
- Country: United States
- State: Michigan
- County: Wexford
- Townships: Boon and Slagle
- Settled: 1889
- Incorporated: 1891

Government
  - Type: Village council
  - President: Keith Broughton
  - Clerk: Mary Morisette

Area
  - Total: 0.99 sq mi (2.57 km^{2})
  - Land: 0.99 sq mi (2.57 km^{2})
  - Water: 0 sq mi (0.00 km^{2})
- Elevation: 1,145 ft (349 m)

Population (2020)
  - Total: 151
  - Density: 152.1/sq mi (58.72/km^{2})
- Time zone: UTC-5 (Eastern (EST))
  - Summer (DST): UTC-4 (EDT)
- ZIP code(s): 49638
- Area code: 231
- FIPS code: 26-36720
- GNIS feature ID: 1620134
- Website: https://harriettamichigan.com/

Harrietta is a village in Wexford County of the U.S. state of Michigan. The population was 151 at the 2020 census, which ranked it as the eighth least-populated village in the state. The village is split almost evenly between Slagle Township on the west and Boon Township on the east.

== History ==
The community first platted in 1889 along the Toledo, Ann Arbor and North Michigan Railway. It was recorded with the spelling Harriette, which early founder James Ashley chose from combining his father's name of Harry and his fiancé Henriette Burt. The Springdale post office, which was established earlier to the north in 1874, moved to Harriette in 1890 but retained is original name. The community incorporated as a village in 1891 under the name Gaston, but railway executives insisted on returning the community to its original name of Harriette in 1892. The community and post office name was again changed to its current name of Harrietta in 1925.

== Geography ==
According to the U.S. Census Bureau, the village has a total area of 0.99 square miles (2.56 km^{2}), all land.

== Demographics ==
Historical population
Census	Pop.	Note	%±
1890	335		—
1900	419		25.1%
1910	336		−19.8%
1920	226		−32.7%
1930	149		−34.1%
1940	208		39.6%
1950	112		−46.2%
1960	119		6.3%
1970	132		10.9%
1980	139		5.3%
1990	157		12.9%
2000	169		7.6%
2010	143		−15.4%
2020	151		5.6%
U.S. Decennial Census

=== 2010 census ===
As of the census of 2010, there were 143 people, 60 households, and 40 families residing in the village. The population density was 153.8 inhabitants per square mile (59.4/km^{2}). There were 103 housing units at an average density of 110.8 units per square mile (42.8 units/km^{2}). The racial makeup of the village was 94.4% White, 0.7% African American, 0.7% Asian, and 4.2% from two or more races. Hispanic or Latino of any race were 4.2% of the population.

There were 60 households, of which 21.7% had children under the age of 18 living with them, 53.3% were married couples living together, 5.0% had a female householder with no husband present, 8.3% had a male householder with no wife present, and 33.3% were non-families. 26.7% of all households were made up of individuals, and 10% had someone living alone who was 65 years of age or older. The average household size was 2.38 and the average family size was 2.80.

The median age in the village was 46.1 years. 21% of residents were under the age of 18; 4.2% were between the ages of 18 and 24; 23.1% were from 25 to 44; 34.3% were from 45 to 64; and 17.5% were 65 years of age or older. The gender makeup of the village was 53.8% male and 46.2% female.

=== 2000 census ===
As of the census of 2000, there were 169 people, 63 households, and 43 families residing in the village. The population density was 182.0 inhabitants per square mile (70.3/km^{2}). There were 93 housing units at an average density of 100.2 units per square mile (38.7 units/km^{2}). The racial makeup of the village was 98.22% White, 0.59% from other races, and 1.18% from two or more races. Hispanic or Latino of any race were 4.73% of the population.

There were 63 households, out of which 27.0% had children under the age of 18 living with them, 54.0% were married couples living together, 12.7% had a female householder with no husband present, and 30.2% were non-families. 23.8% of all households were made up of individuals, and 12.7% had someone living alone who was 65 years of age or older. The average household size was 2.68 and the average family size was 3.18.

In the village, the population was spread out, with 26.6% under the age of 18, 8.3% from 18 to 24, 28.4% from 25 to 44, 20.1% from 45 to 64, and 16.6% who were 65 years of age or older. The median age was 37 years. For every 100 females, there were 96.5 males. For every 100 females age 18 and over, there were 90.8 males.

The median income for a household in the village was $33,500, and the median income for a family was $34,286. Males had a median income of $28,125 versus $31,563 for females. The per capita income for the village was $15,258. About 4.8% of families and 6.9% of the population were below the poverty line, including 5.6% of those under the age of eighteen and none of those sixty-five or over.

== Images ==
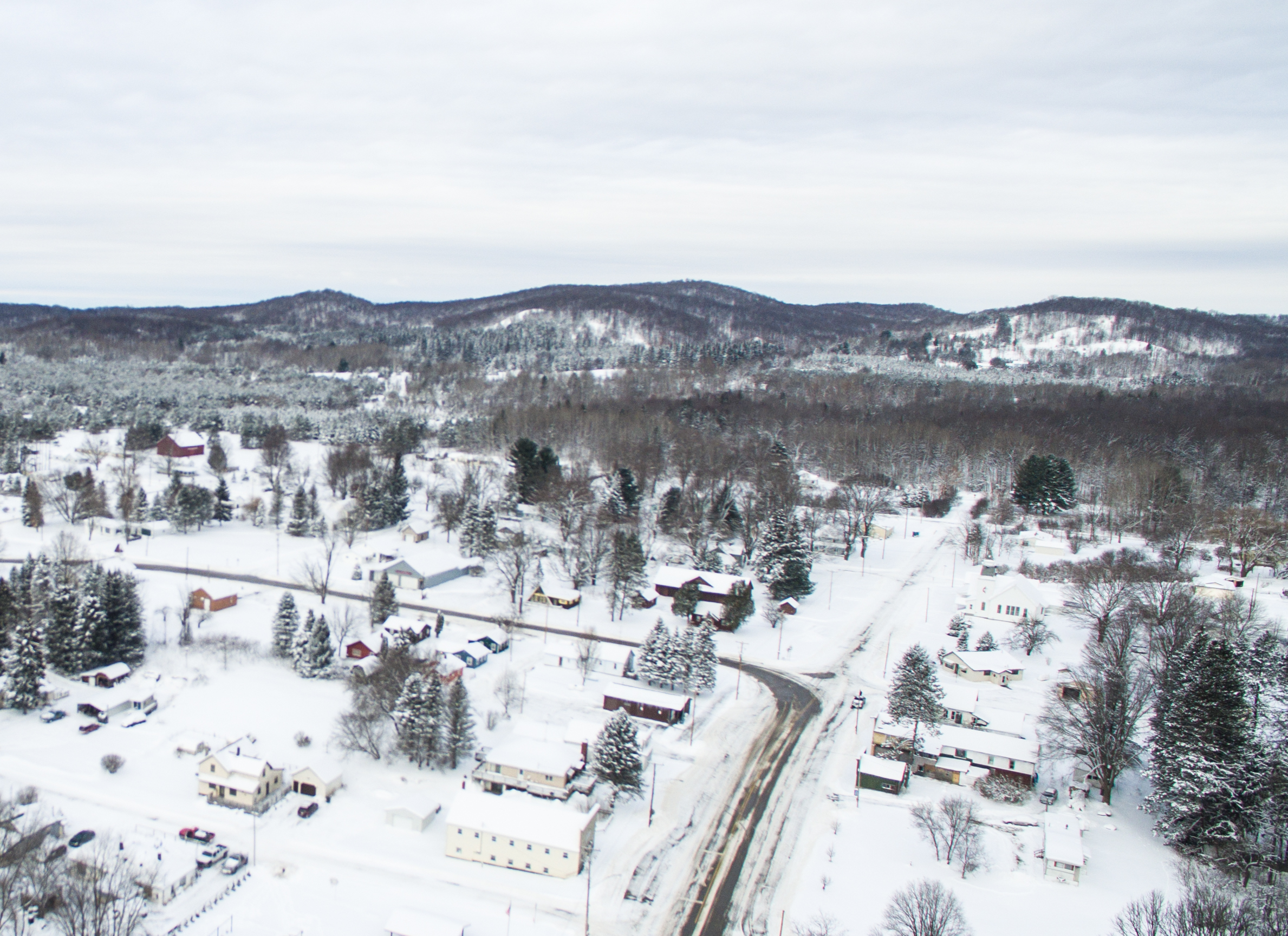
Aerial view in December 2017

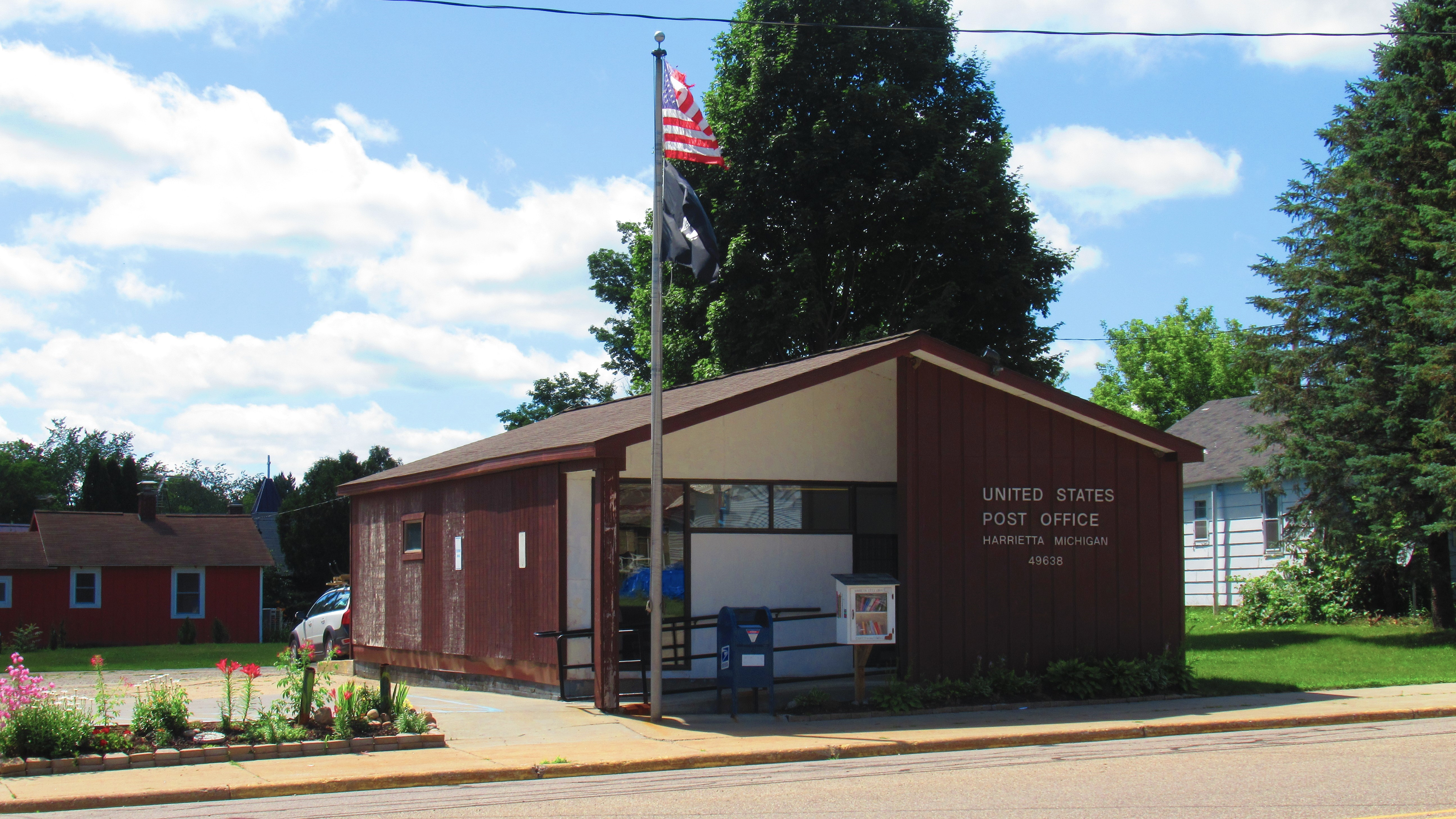
U.S. Post Office in Harrietta

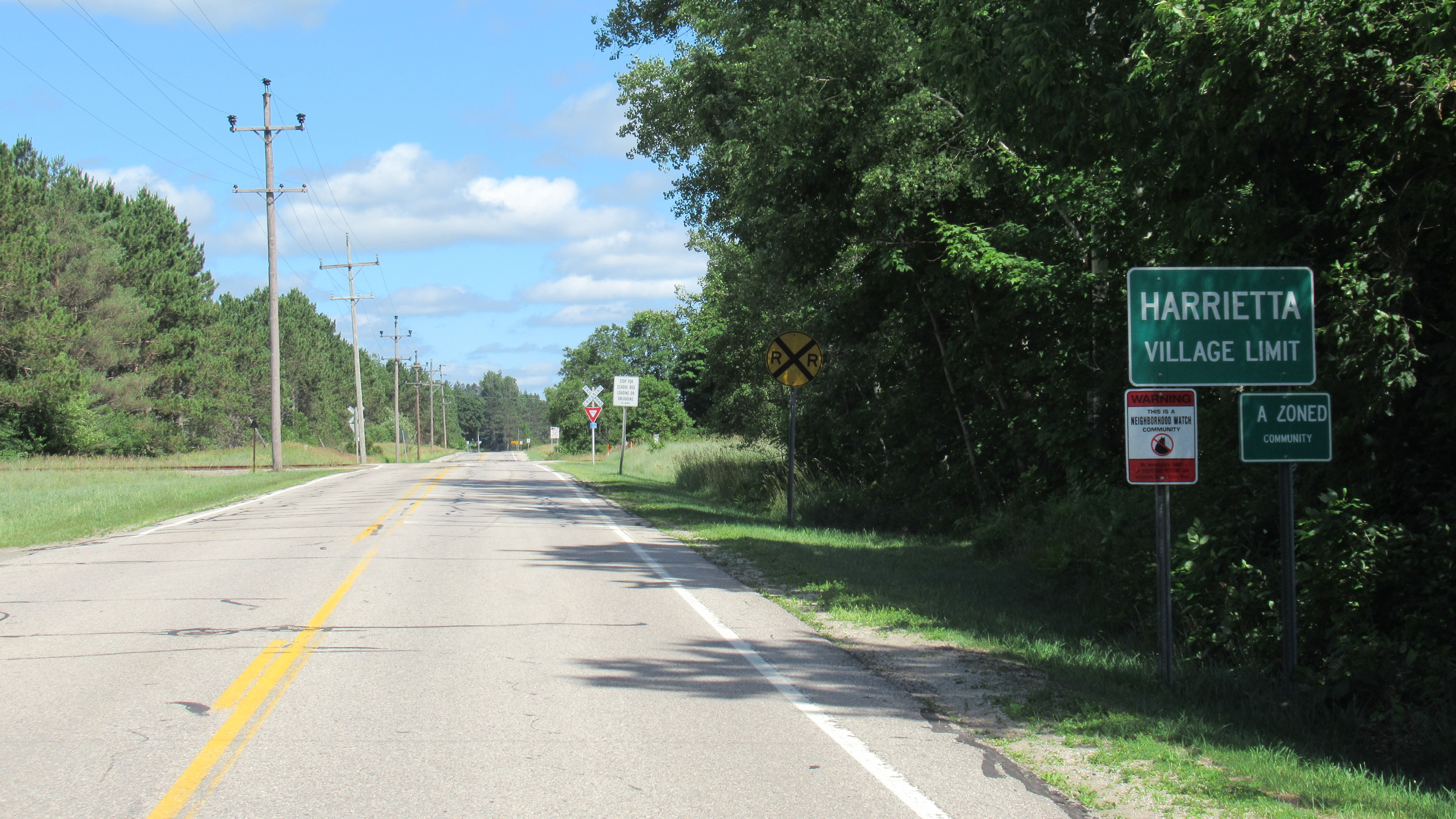
Road signage along Slagle Street

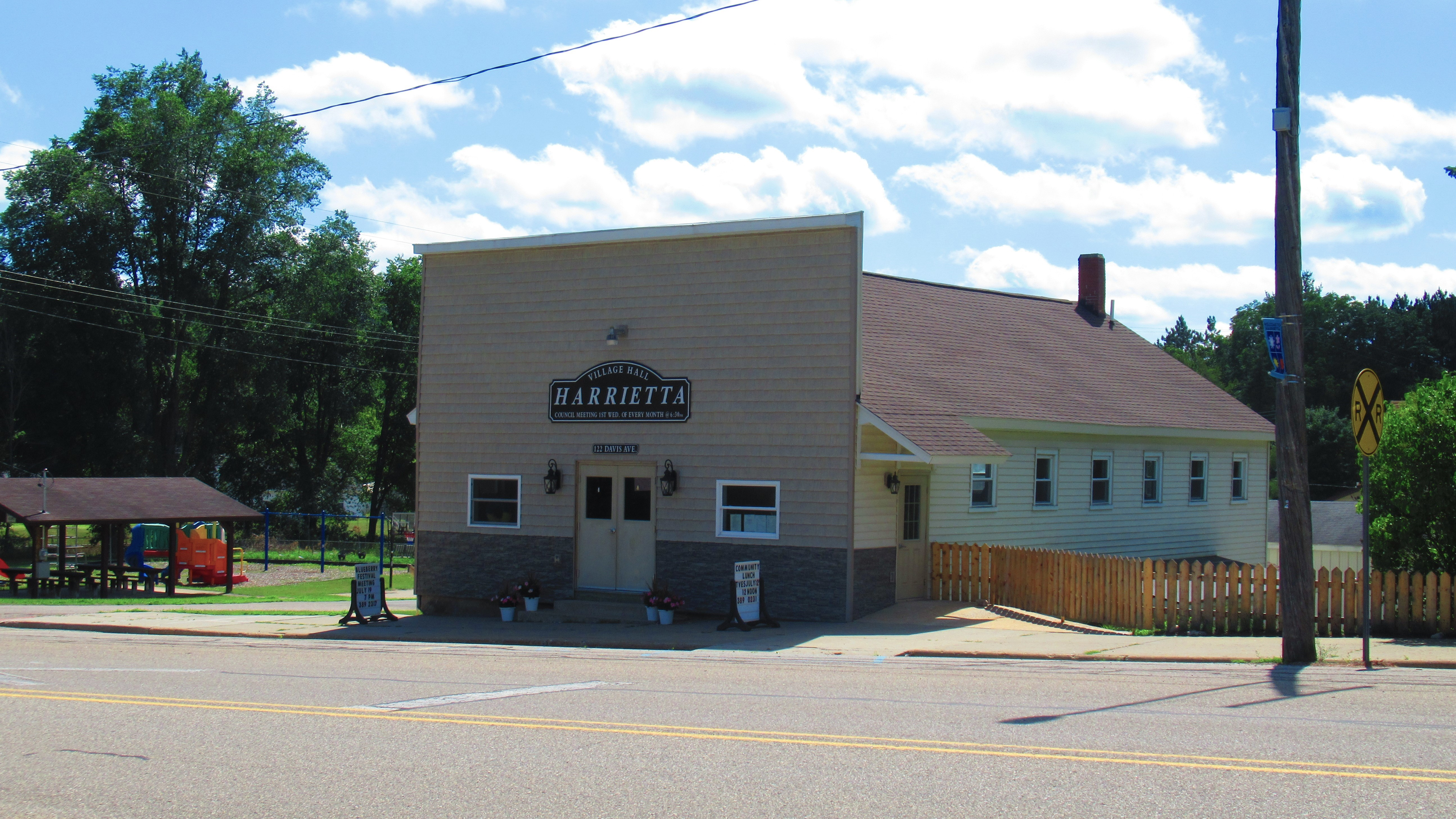
Harrietta Village Hall
