= Caberfae Peaks Ski & Golf Resort =

Ski area in Michigan, United States

Caberfae Peaks Ski Resort
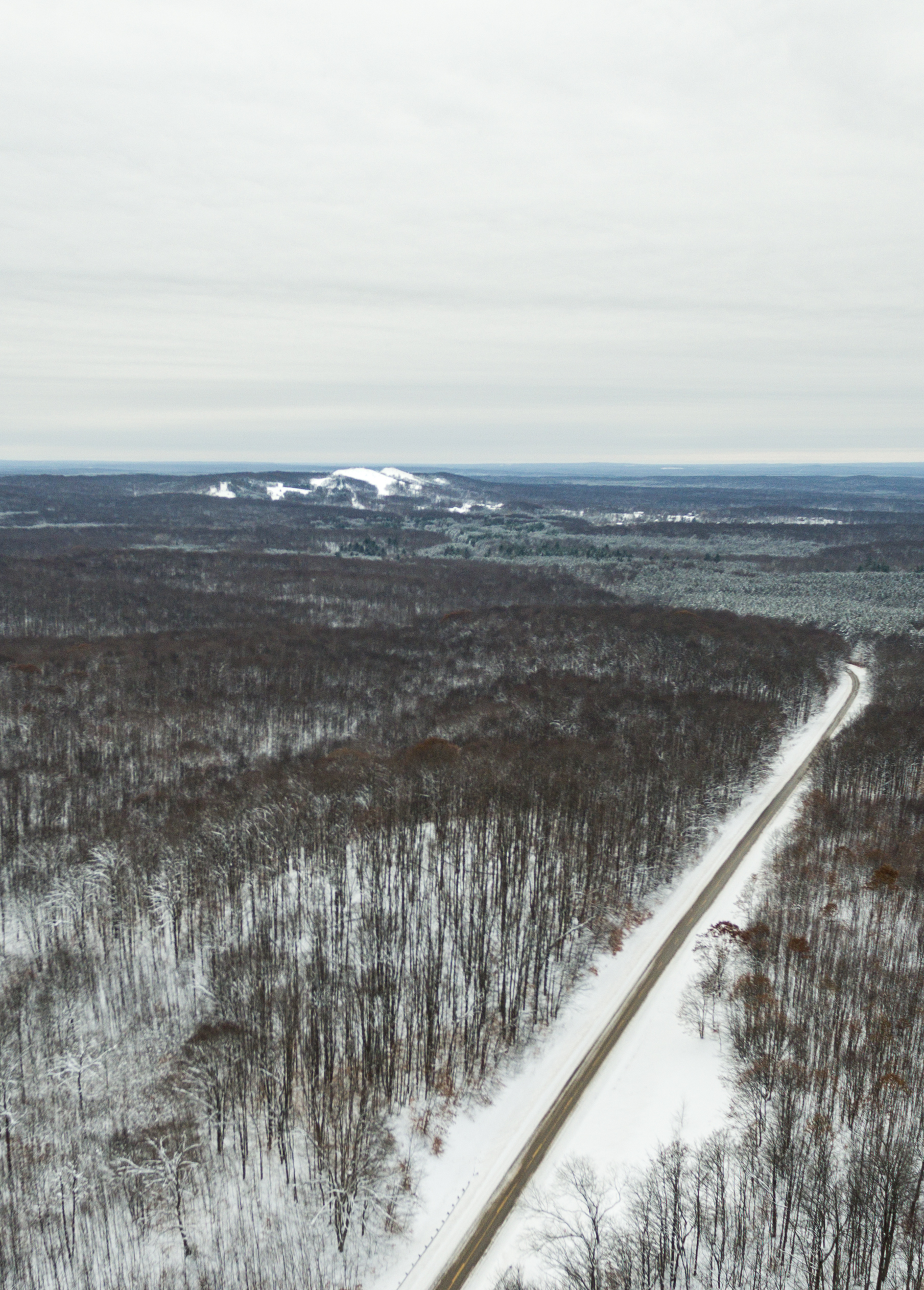
- Aerial view of Caberfae facing south, early December 2017

- Location within Michigan
- Location: Caberfae, Michigan
- Nearest city: Cadillac, Michigan
- Coordinates: 44°14′59″N 85°43′30″W
- Vertical: 429 feet (131 m)
- Top elevation: 1,533 ft (467 m)
- Base elevation: 1,181 ft (360 m)
- Skiable area: 225 acres (0.91 km^{2})
- Trails: 34
- Longest run: 3,960 feet (1,210 m)
- Lift system: 4 chair lifts, 1 surface lifts
- Lift capacity: 9,207 skiers/hr
- Terrain parks: Yes - 1
- Snowfall: 125 inches (320 cm) annual
- Snowmaking: Yes
- Night skiing: Yes
- Website: http://caberfaepeaks.com

Caberfae Ski Resort Company
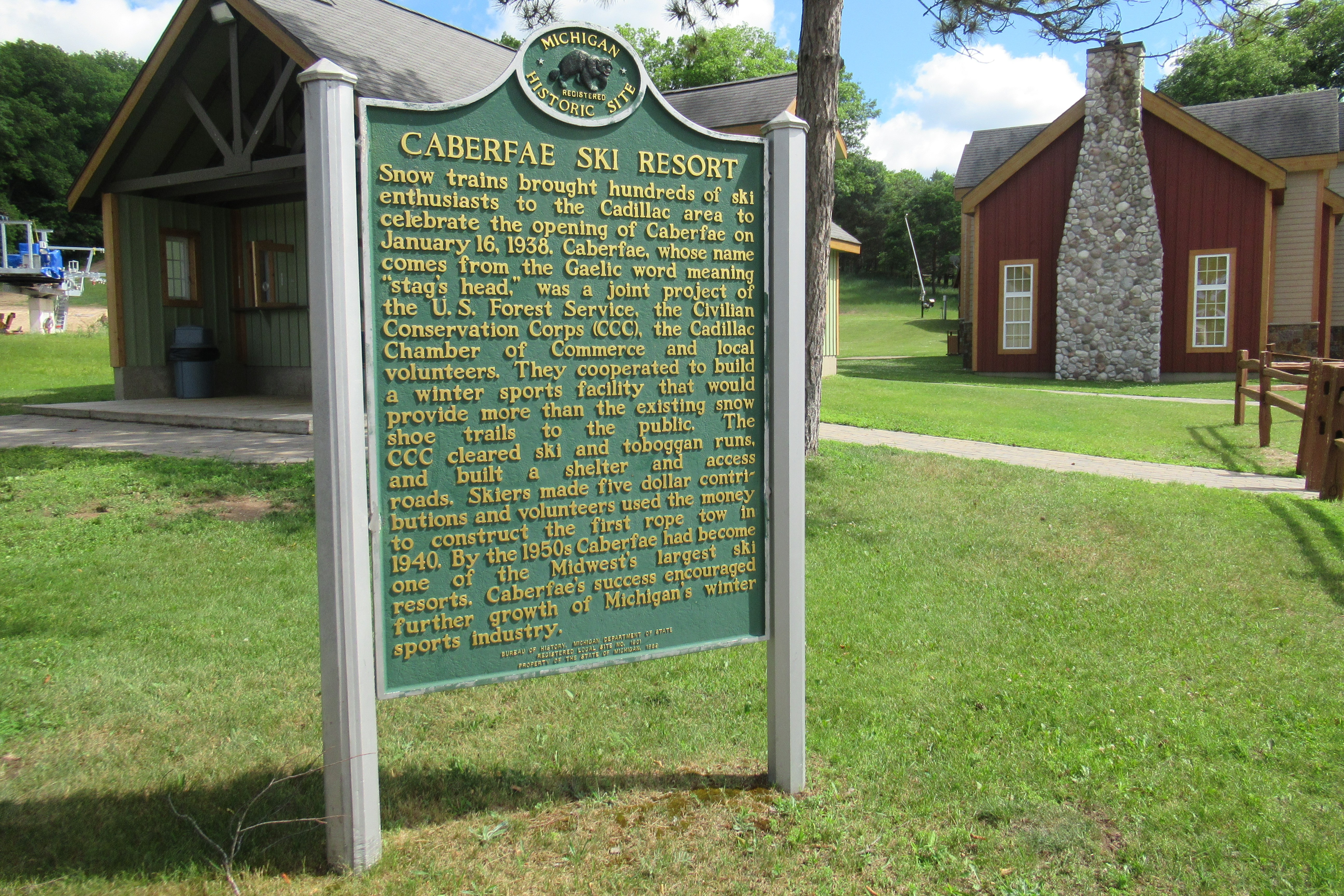
- Caberfae Ski Resort Company historic marker
- Interactive map of Caberfae Ski Resort Company

Michigan State Historic Site
- Designated: November 1, 1988

Caberfae Peaks (/kæbərfeɪ/ KAB-ər-fay) is a downhill ski area located in the Lower Peninsula of Michigan near Cadillac, Michigan. It gets its name from the Gaelic word for "stag's head".

== History ==
Caberfae Peaks' official opening was in January, 1937, making it one of the oldest ski resorts in the US. The resort opened with a lodge built by the Civilian Conservation Corps and one ski trail named "Number One". The first rope tow was powered by a Ford Model A car engine. Over the next five years, a dozen more trails were cleared and several rope tows were installed. It closed after the 1942–43 season and didn't open again until after the end of World War II.

With its ten-year head-start on Boyne Mountain, Caberfae became Michigan's largest winter sports area by the mid-1950s. Regularly scheduled "snow trains" brought thousands of skiers to the area, with daily crowds sometimes exceeding 4000. A snowmaking system was installed in 1957.

The resort continued to expand throughout the 1960s, adding trails and lifts to bring the count up to 35 trails serviced by 20 lifts. However, poor snow during the 1965 and 1966 holiday periods caused financial difficulties for the operation and the resort was sold to a private company in 1967. Prior to this it had been managed as a non-profit.

The resort struggled financially throughout the 70s. New owners in 1980 began expanding the resort, bringing in fill dirt to raise the summit of the North Peak and opening the South Peak. The South Peak opened in 1983 and the North Peak expansion was completed in 1992, increasing the vertical drop to 429'. Meanwhile, many of the trails cleared in the 50s and 60s were abandoned and most of the rope tows removed.

For the 2013–2014 season, Caberfae opened 25 acres of gladed terrain off the North Peak.

== Winter activities ==
The area offers cross-country skiing and alpine skiing. Snowshoeing, ice skating, and snowmobiling are available nearby.

== Summer activities ==
=== Golf ===
The 9 hole regulation length golf course opened in 1995.
