= Nika Boon =

Polish singer-songwriter based in London UK

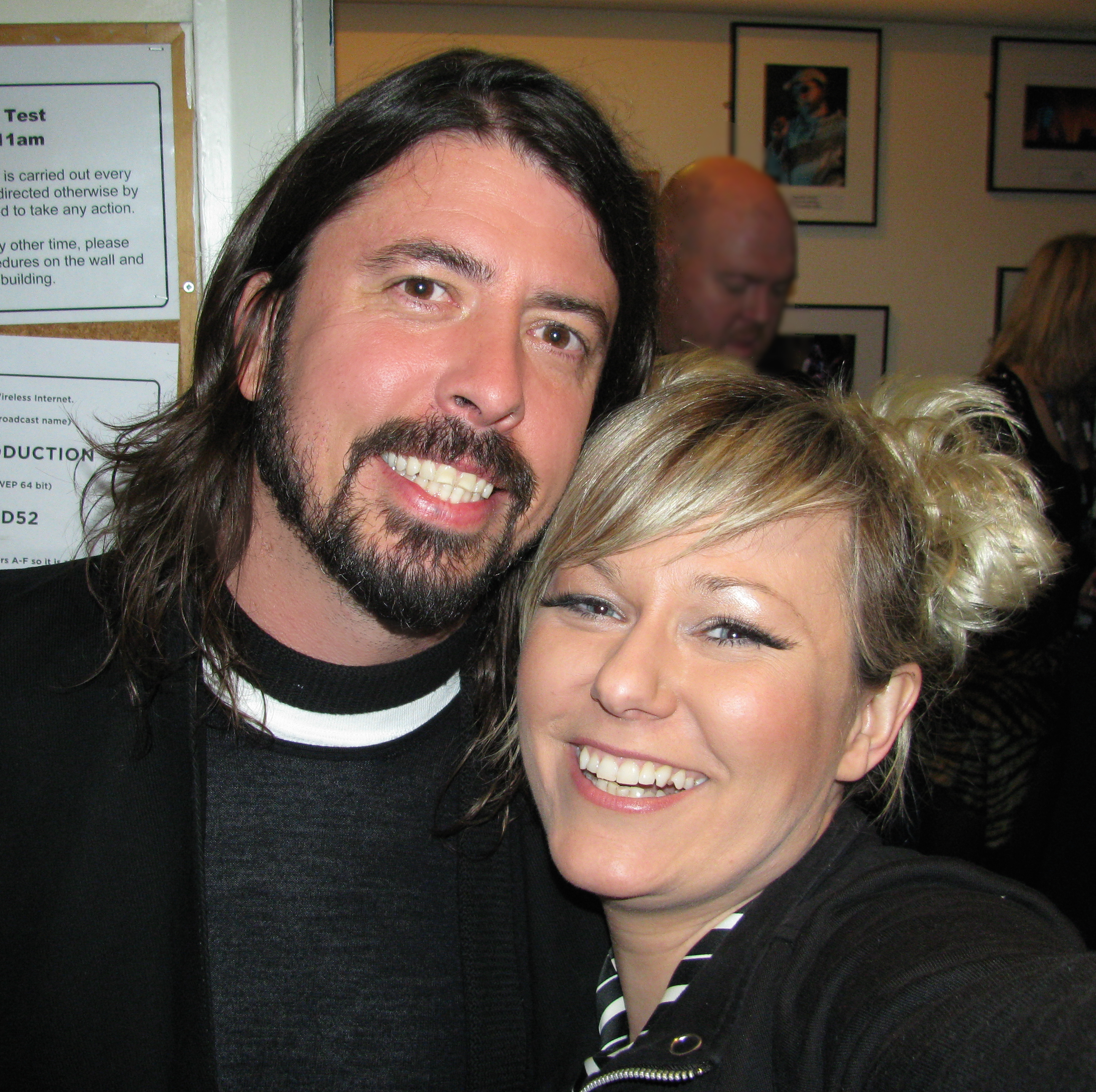
- Nika Boon with Dave Grohl at Brixton Academy in London

Background information
- Born: Gdańsk, Poland
- Genres: alternative rock, electro, chill-out, dance and trip-hop
- Occupations: singer and songwriter
- Website: www.nikaboon.com

Nika Boon is a Polish singer-songwriter based in London, UK. She is best known for her husky vocal style. She released her album Rebel in 2017, in collaboration with musicians John Baggott (who plays keyboard & moogs for Massive Attack, Portishead, Robert Plant), Ian Matthews (drummer from Kasabian), and Jay Stapley (guitarist associated with Pink Floyd and Mike Oldfield).

== Career ==
When Nika arrived in London, she submerged herself in the London music scene and become a part of British bands like Blue Drag signed to Black on Black Records from original Hoxton Square crew and later Talismantra managed by then Prodigy's manager Mike Champion. As a songwriter and vocalist, Boon collaborated with an eclectic mix of artists over the years in a variety of styles including alternative rock, electro, chill-out, dance and trip-hop with producers like Andy Gill (from Gang of Four) on one end of spectrum and Solu Music on the other.

In 2000, Nika met Top New York DJ, Roger Sanchez during Madonna's much-anticipated comeback concert at the Brixton Academy. Impressed by her voice, Sanchez signed Nika to his own label leading to her first Stealth label release "Alone". Sanchez kept on releasing Nika's songs on his yearly compilations “Release Yourself” until 2006.

Boon has collaborated with DJs and producers like Timo Garcia, Sandy Rivera from Kings of Tomorrow, G-Club, Fingertapp, Eric Kupper, Dario G, Cheshire Catz, Tall Paul amongst others. Her tracks can also be found on Defected Records and Berwick Street Records. However, in her 2017 album “Rebel” she is firmly going back to her rock roots that inspired her at the beginning of her musical adventure.

== Early life ==
Boon was born in Gdańsk, Poland. At the age of sixteen, she went to art school in Gdynia Orłowo, Poland (Zespół Szkół Plastycznych w Gdyni) to study photography and fine arts. While studying, she was able to form her own grunge and punk-rock band Energia in which she practiced and developed her songwriting and vocal abilities. Later on in life, her early knowledge of visual arts helped her create costumes, on stage props and styling. Until now, she gets heavily involved in her video production and stage presence. Boon performed at a well known Polish Jarocin Festival as a vocalist of band Out Of Site. At this festival she met Muniek Staszczyk from the band, T-Love who confirmed her determination of pursuing a music path.

Nika's first media exposure happened when she won first ever show of "Szansa Na Sukces" (A Chance for Success), a talent show on a Polish Television Network (that ran from November 1993 to April 2012). During the show, she sang “Rozmowa Przez Ocean” by Maryla Rodowicz. After the airing of this show by Polonia TV in 1994, English record company Orca contacted the show to invite her for a recording in London, marking it the start of her career in the UK. She moved to the London Covent Garden and explored the London music scene. She later went on to study music at the University of Westminster and art at Central Saint Martins.

== Discography ==
| Album title | Release date | Label |
|---|---|---|
| Alone | March 25, 2002 | Defected & Stealth Records |
| Release Yourself compilations | 2006 | Stealth Records |
| Just Get Over It | March 26, 2007 | Berwick Street Records |
| I Will Never | October 1, 2008 | Effectiva Records |
| Troublemaker | April 24, 2011 | Effectiva Records |
| Faces | May 1, 2012 | Effectiva Records |

- "Just Get Over It" (2007) on Berwick Street Records – Single
- "I Will Never"(2008) on Effectiva Records - Single
- "Troublemaker"(2011) on Effectiva Records - Album
- "Faces"(2012) on Effectiva Records - Album
- "Rebel" - Mar. 24, 2017 label: Polskie Radio
