= Laura Wexler =

American feminist

Academic background
- Education: Sarah Lawrence; Columbia University; Massachusetts Institute of Technology

Academic work
- Discipline: Visual culture American studies Gender studies Feminism
- Institutions: Yale University; Columbia University

Laura Wexler is Professor of American Studies, Professor of Women's, Gender, and Sexuality Studies, and co-chair of the Women's Faculty Forum at Yale University. An American feminist theorist her academic concerns are in the disciplines of women's studies and visual culture.

She completed her undergraduate studies at Sarah Lawrence College, having also attended the Massachusetts Institute of Technology where she studied photography. She holds M.A., M.Phil., and Ph.D. degrees from Columbia University in English and Comparative Literature.

Wexler is a current Fellow of the Center for the Critical Analysis of Social Difference at Columbia University, a former Fellow of the Whitney Humanities Center of Yale University. She is a member of the Board of Trustees of the Muriel Gardiner Society for Psychoanalysis and the Humanities, and the Board of Trustees of the Joseph Slifka Center for Jewish Life at Yale.

Wexler's book Tender Violence: Domestic Visions in an Age of U. S. Imperialism (2000) was a recipient of the American Historical Association's Joan Kelley Memorial Prize.

== Books ==
- Tender Violence: Domestic Visions in an Age of U. S. Imperialism (2000).
- Pregnant Pictures (2000), with photographer Sandra Matthews.
- Interpretation and the Holocaust. Wexler is co-editor, with Laura Frost, Amy Hungerford and John MacKay.
