= Ingrid Tieken-Boon van Ostade =

Dutch socio-historical linguist

Ingrid Marijke Tieken-Boon van Ostade (born 1954, The Hague) is a professor emeritus of English Sociohistorical Linguistics at Leiden University's Centre for Linguistics. She has researched widely in the area of English socio-historical linguistics having looked at such diverse fields as English negations, historical social network analysis, the standardisation process and the language of 18th-century letters. She has recently published a book on Bishop Lowth (1710–1787) (the author of one of the most influential textbooks of English grammar). Her work on a collaborative project on English usage was featured in the BBC Radio 4's Making History programme.

She is the editor of the journal Historical Sociolinguistics and Sociohistorical linguistics and has presented plenary sessions at important conferences and symposiums in her field.

In the 2020s she is supervising the project Bridging the Unbridgeable: linguists, prescriptivists and the general public.

She became a member of the Royal Netherlands Academy of Arts and Sciences in 2014.

On the 11th of September 2020, Tieken-Boon van Ostade was appointed knight in the Order of the Netherlands Lion.

== Selected publications ==
- Tieken-Boon van Ostade, I.M. (2010) The Bishop's Grammar: Robert Lowth and the Rise of Prescriptivism. Oxford: OUP
- Tieken-Boon van Ostade, I.M. (2009) An Introduction to Late Modern English. Edinburgh: Edinburgh University Press.
- Tieken-Boon van Ostade, I.M. (Ed.) (1996) Two hundred years of Lindley Murray. Münster: Nodus Publikationen.
- Tieken-Boon van Ostade, I.M. (1995) The two versions of Malory's Morte Darthur: Multiple negation and the editing of the text. Cambridge: Brewer.
