= Dan Boone (minister) =

American minister

- Education: McCormick Theological Seminary
- Occupations: Nazarene minister Author; University President

Dan Boone is a Nazarene minister, author, and President of Trevecca Nazarene University.

== Biography ==
Dan Boone is a descendant of the frontiersman Daniel Boone. He has served as the senior pastor of North Raleigh Church of the Nazarene in Raleigh, North Carolina, Trevecca Community Church of the Nazarene in Nashville, Tennessee and College Church of the Nazarene in Bourbonnais, Illinois, which serves Olivet Nazarene University, as well as the Kankakee-Bradley-Bourbonnais, Illinois community.

In 2005, Dan Boone was elected to serve as the 11th president of Trevecca Nazarene University. He finished his first term as president in 2009 and was elected to a second four-year term in the Spring of 2009.

Dan Boone earned his Doctor of Ministry from McCormick Theological Seminary. He is also a 1977 graduate of Nazarene Theological Seminary and a 1974 graduate of Trevecca Nazarene University. In 2009 he was selected to be part of the 34th Leadership Nashville class.

On March 24, 2017, Trevecca announced a partnership with Eastern Nazarene College in Quincy, Mass., which includes Boone serving as president of both institutions while they worked toward a merger. Boone served as president-elect of ENC until 2018. In March 2018, the merger process was discontinued and Boone stepped away from his ENC role as required by Trevecca's accrediting association. In 2021, his contract at Trevecca was extended for an additional four years.

== Author ==
The following books have been written by Dan Boone. They were all published by Nazarene Publishing House/Beacon Hill Press of Kansas City.

- Answers for Chicken Little-A No-Nonsense Look at the Book of Revelation (2006)
- Dirty Hands, Pure Hearts: Sermons and Conversations with Holiness Preachers (2006) Beacon Hill Press of Kansas City
- The Worship Plot: Finding Unity in Our Common Story (2007)
- Seven Deadly Sins: The Uncomfortable Truth (2008)
- Preaching The Story That Shapes Us (2008)
- Dancing With the Law: The Ten Commandments (2010)
- A Charitable Discourse: Talking About The Things That Divide Us (2011)
- The Lord's Prayer: Imagine It Answered (October 1, 2012); Dust Jacket Press
- The Church in Exile: Interpreting Where We Are (October 2, 2012); Dust Jacket Press
- The Dark Side of God (2013); Elevate Entertainment LLC.
- The Way We Work: How Faith Makes a Difference on the Job (July 2014); Beacon Hill Press/Nazarene Publishing House
- Human Sexuality: A Primer for Christians (Trevecca Press, 2015)
