= Booneville =

Booneville is the name of some places in the United States:

- Booneville, Arkansas
- Booneville, Iowa
- Booneville, Kentucky
- Booneville, Mississippi
- Booneville, Tennessee
- Booneville, New York
- Booneville Channel (Oregon), a Benton County, Oregon channel to the Willamette River

== See also ==
- Boonville (disambiguation)
