= Mick Boon =

New Zealand cricketer

Personal information
- Full name: Malcolm Kittson Boon
- Born: 22 July 1902; Christchurch, New Zealand
- Died: 12 July 1988 (aged 85); Christchurch, New Zealand
- Batting: Right-handed
- Role: Wicket-keeper

Domestic team information
- Years: Team
- 1922–23 to 1927–28: Canterbury

Career statistics
Competition	First-class
Matches	13
Runs scored	376
Batting average	15.66
100s/50s	0/2
Top score	72
Catches/stumpings	10/5
- Source: Cricinfo, 18 April 2019

Malcolm Kittson "Mick" Boon (22 July 1902 – 12 July 1988) was a New Zealand cricketer who played first-class cricket for Canterbury between 1923 and 1927, and represented New Zealand in 1923–24. He also represented New Zealand at lawn bowls.

== Cricket career ==
Boon was a wicket-keeper and useful lower-order batsman. He was selected to play in both of New Zealand's matches against New South Wales in 1923–24, but after the first match in Christchurch his employer, the Public Trustee, refused to grant him leave to travel to Wellington for the second. His highest first-class score was 72 for Canterbury against Auckland in 1926–27.

Boon's first-class career ended when he left Christchurch and moved to Gisborne in 1930. He represented Poverty Bay in Hawke Cup cricket in the 1930s.

== Later life ==
Boon left Gisborne late in 1937 and moved to Wellington, where he worked in the civil service. Later he returned to Christchurch, where he retired.

Boon also represented Canterbury and New Zealand at lawn bowls. He was a member of New Zealand's team at the 1962 Commonwealth Games in Perth.

Boon married Rita Millard in the Christchurch suburb of Linwood in March 1930. He died aged 85 in Christchurch in July 1988.
