= Stuart Boon =

English cricketer

Stuart Boon (25 February 1934 – 13 August 1989) was an English cricketer who played for Hertfordshire. He was born in Stafford and died in Stoke-on-Trent.

Booth, who debuted in the Minor Counties Championship in 1955 for Staffordshire, moved to Hertfordshire in 1961, and played for the team between 1961 and 1968.

He made a single List A appearance for the team, during the 1964 Gillette Cup, against Hertfordshire. From the lower-middle order, he scored a single run.
