= Boone, Missouri =

Ghost town in Missouri, United States

Coordinates: 38.259215°N 91.3232055°W

Boone is an extinct town in Franklin County, in the U.S. state of Missouri.

A post office called Boone was established in 1851, and remained in operation until 1907. The community most likely took its name from Boone Township.
