= Alexis Boon =

British constable

Alexis Bryan Boon QPM (born May 1976) is the Chief Constable of the Hampshire and Isle of Wight Constabulary.

== Career ==
Boon started his policing career in 1998, joining Surrey Police. Later in his career, he led the Metropolitan Police's Flying Squad and served as a Metropolitan Police deputy assistant commissioner. He took up the role of Chief Constable of the Hampshire and Isle of Wight Constabulary in August 2025.

== Honours ==

Ribbon	Description	Notes
	Queen's Police Medal (QPM)	2021
	Queen Elizabeth II Diamond Jubilee Medal	
	Queen Elizabeth II Platinum Jubilee Medal	
	King Charles III Coronation Medal	
	Police Long Service and Good Conduct Medal	

Boon was awarded the Queen's Police Medal for distinguished service in the 2021 Birthday Honours.
