= Mike Boon =

New Zealand stand-up comedian (born 1970)

- Born: 1970 (age 55–56); Hastings, New Zealand

Comedy career
- Genres: Sketch and character comedy

Mike Boon (born 1970, Hastings, New Zealand) is a stand-up comedian from New Zealand.

== Career ==
=== Comedy ===
After establishing himself as an original performer and writer of sketch and character comedy, Boon emigrated to the United Kingdom. In 2003, he performed The Boon Show: Live for three and a half weeks at the Edinburgh Festival Fringe, which he claims resulted in a financial loss of £7,500. His 2010 show at the Herald Theatre in Auckland, Mr Boon’s Big Time Last Chance Kids’ Show, featured special guest New Zealand comedian Rhys Darby. Boon has performed a number of further shows in Auckland, including Mr Boon Saves Christmas and Mr Boon's Fairy Tales in 2010 and 2012 respectively, which have been positively reviewed for both adults and children.
