= Daniel Boone High School =

Daniel Boone High School may refer to:

- Daniel Boone High School (Pennsylvania)
- Daniel Boone High School (Tennessee)
