= Boon Township, Michigan =

- Civil township
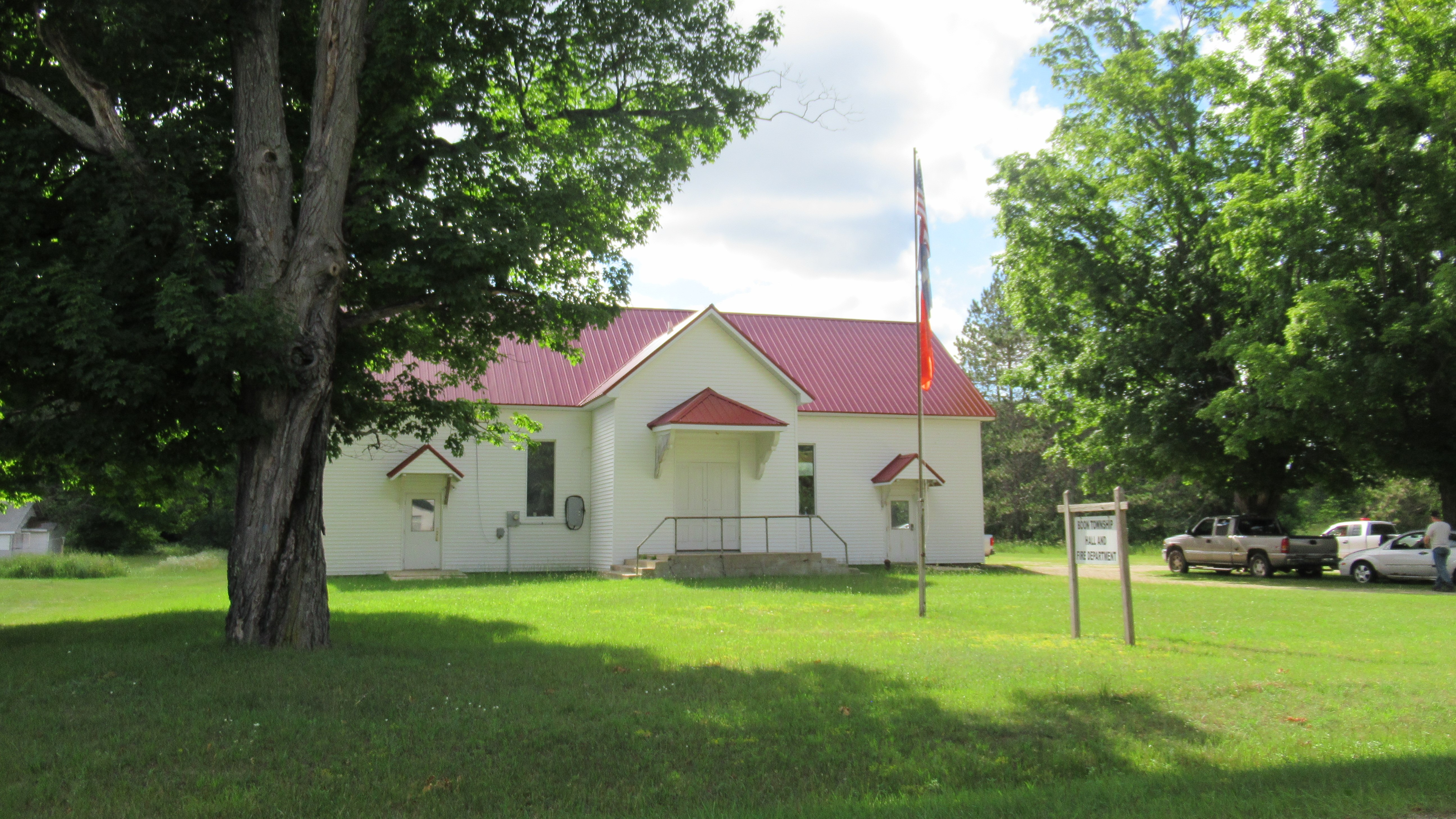
- Boon Township Hall and Fire Department

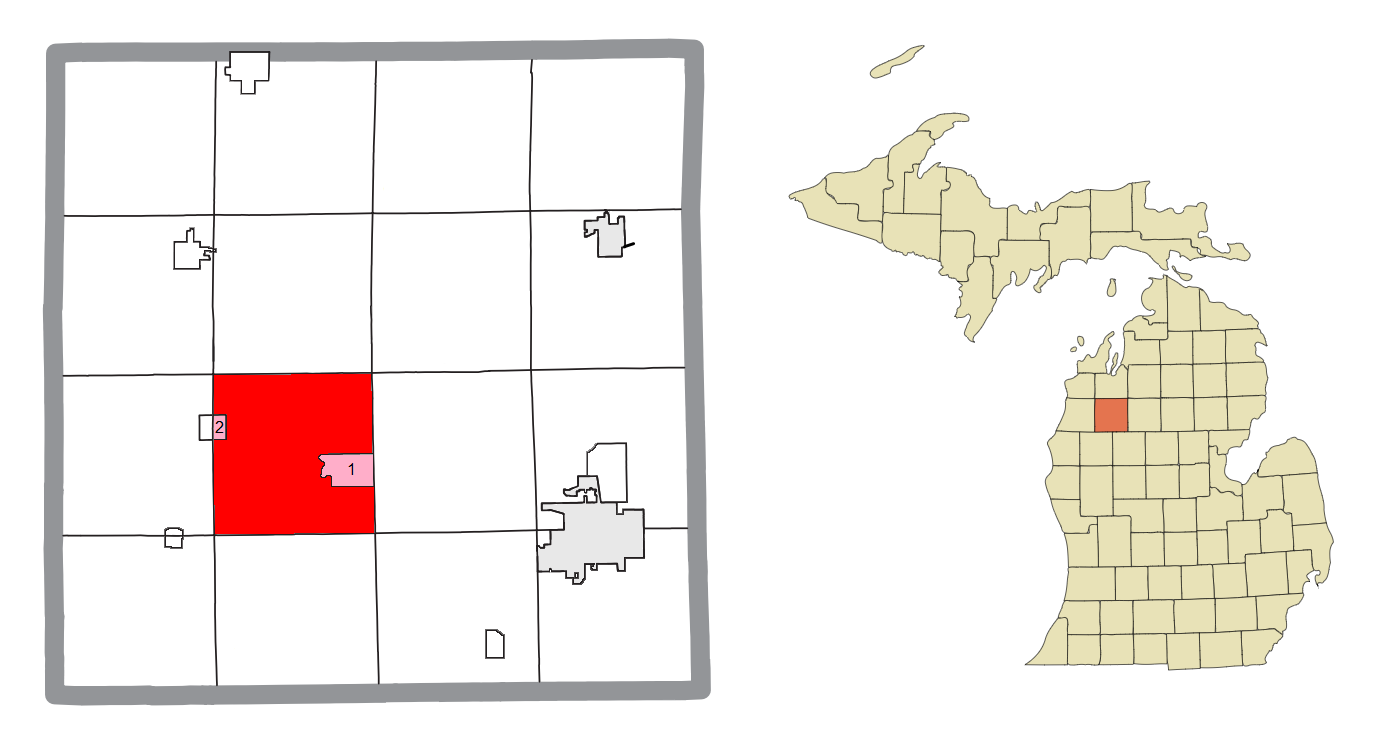
- Location within Wexford County and the administered CDP of Boon (1) and portion of the village of Harrietta (2)

- Location within the state of Michigan Location within the United States
- Coordinates: 44°18′05″N 85°38′36″W
- Country: United States
- State: Michigan
- County: Wexford

Government
  - Supervisor: Mathew Beattie
  - Clerk: Sheila Pratt

Area
  - Total: 36.01 sq mi (93.27 km^{2})
  - Land: 36.01 sq mi (93.27 km^{2})
  - Water: 0 sq mi (0.00 km^{2})
- Elevation: 1,217 ft (371 m)

Population (2020)
  - Total: 650
  - Density: 18/sq mi (7.0/km^{2})
- Time zone: UTC-5 (Eastern (EST))
  - Summer (DST): UTC-4 (EDT)
- ZIP code(s): 49618 (Boon); 49638 (Harrietta)
- Area code: 231
- FIPS code: 26-09580
- GNIS feature ID: 1625961
- Website: https://boontownshipmichigan.gov/

Boon Township is a civil township of Wexford County in the U.S. state of Michigan. The population was 650 at the 2020 census.

== Communities ==
- Boon is an unincorporated community and census-designated place located in the Manistee National Forest at 44°17′23″N 85°36′07″W. The Boon 49618 ZIP Code serves the eastern portion of the township. The community was settled as early as 1888.
- Harrietta is a village located in the northwestern portion of the township. A smaller portion of the village extends to the west into Slagle Township. The Harrietta 49638 ZIP Code serves the western portion of the township.

== Geography ==
According to the U.S. Census Bureau, the township has a total area of 36.01 square miles (93.27 km^{2}), all land.

=== Major highways ===
- M-115 runs diagonally through the northeast corner of the township.

== Demographics ==
As of the census of 2000, there were 670 people, 234 households, and 190 families residing in the township. The population density was 18.6 inhabitants per square mile (7.2/km^{2}). There were 342 housing units at an average density of 9.5 per square mile (3.7/km^{2}). The racial makeup of the township was 98.36% White, 0.15% Native American, 0.15% from other races, and 1.34% from two or more races. Hispanic or Latino of any race were 1.64% of the population.

There were 234 households, out of which 35.9% had children under the age of 18 living with them, 67.1% were married couples living together, 8.1% had a female householder with no husband present, and 18.8% were non-families. 14.5% of all households were made up of individuals, and 5.6% had someone living alone who was 65 years of age or older. The average household size was 2.86 and the average family size was 3.13.

In the township the population was spread out, with 27.9% under the age of 18, 7.8% from 18 to 24, 30.1% from 25 to 44, 23.7% from 45 to 64, and 10.4% who were 65 years of age or older. The median age was 36 years. For every 100 females, there were 108.1 males. For every 100 females age 18 and over, there were 101.3 males.

The median income for a household in the township was $41,042, and the median income for a family was $43,304. Males had a median income of $28,917 versus $21,771 for females. The per capita income for the township was $16,294. About 5.7% of families and 7.2% of the population were below the poverty line, including 8.4% of those under age 18 and 6.7% of those age 65 or over.

== Education ==
Boon Township is served by two separate school districts. The majority of the township is served by Cadillac Area Public Schools, while a smaller northern portion of the township is served by Mesick Consolidated Schools in Mesick to the northwest.
