= Boon, Michigan =

- Census-designated place (CDP) & unincorporated community
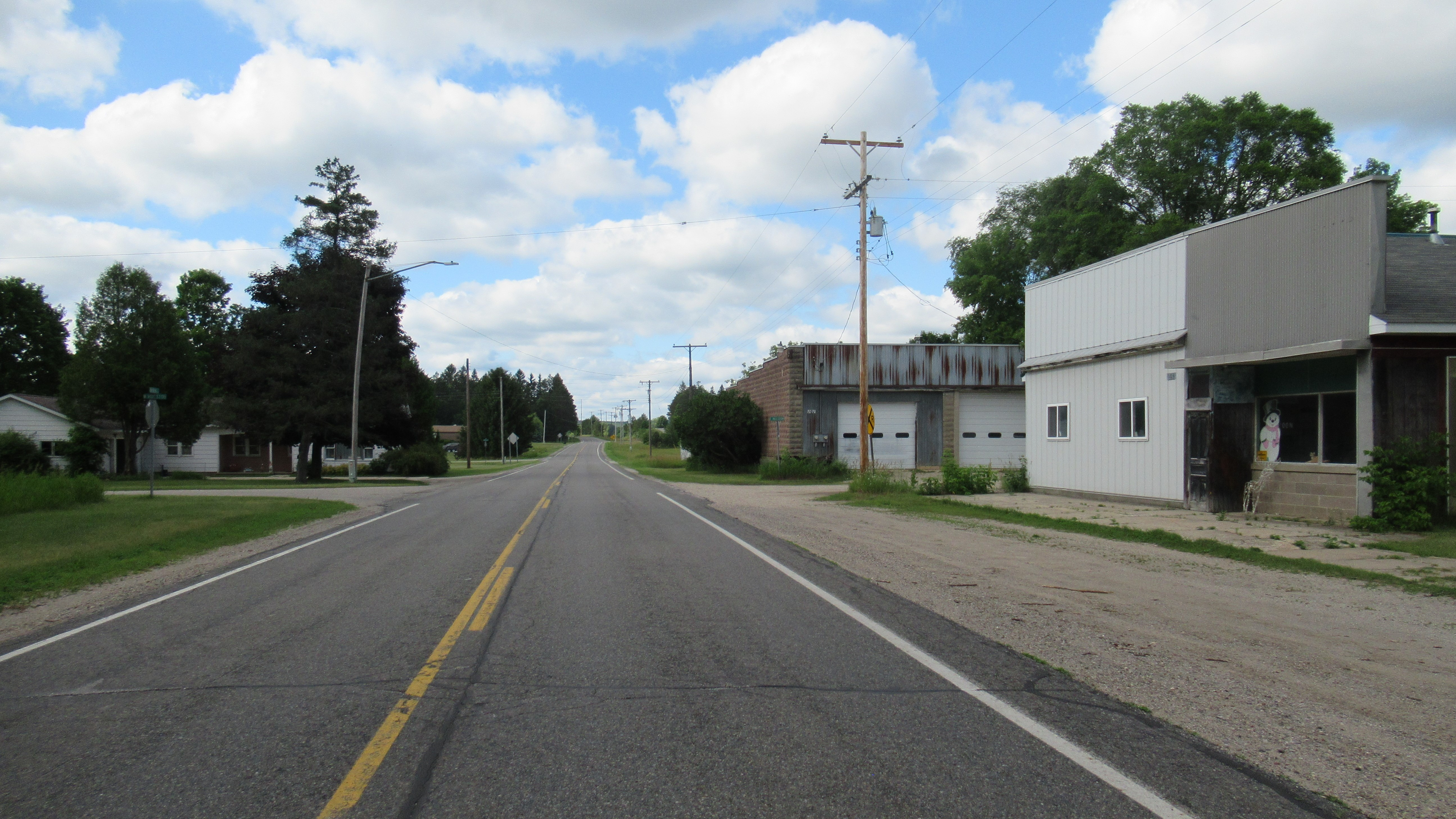
- Looking north along South 23 Road

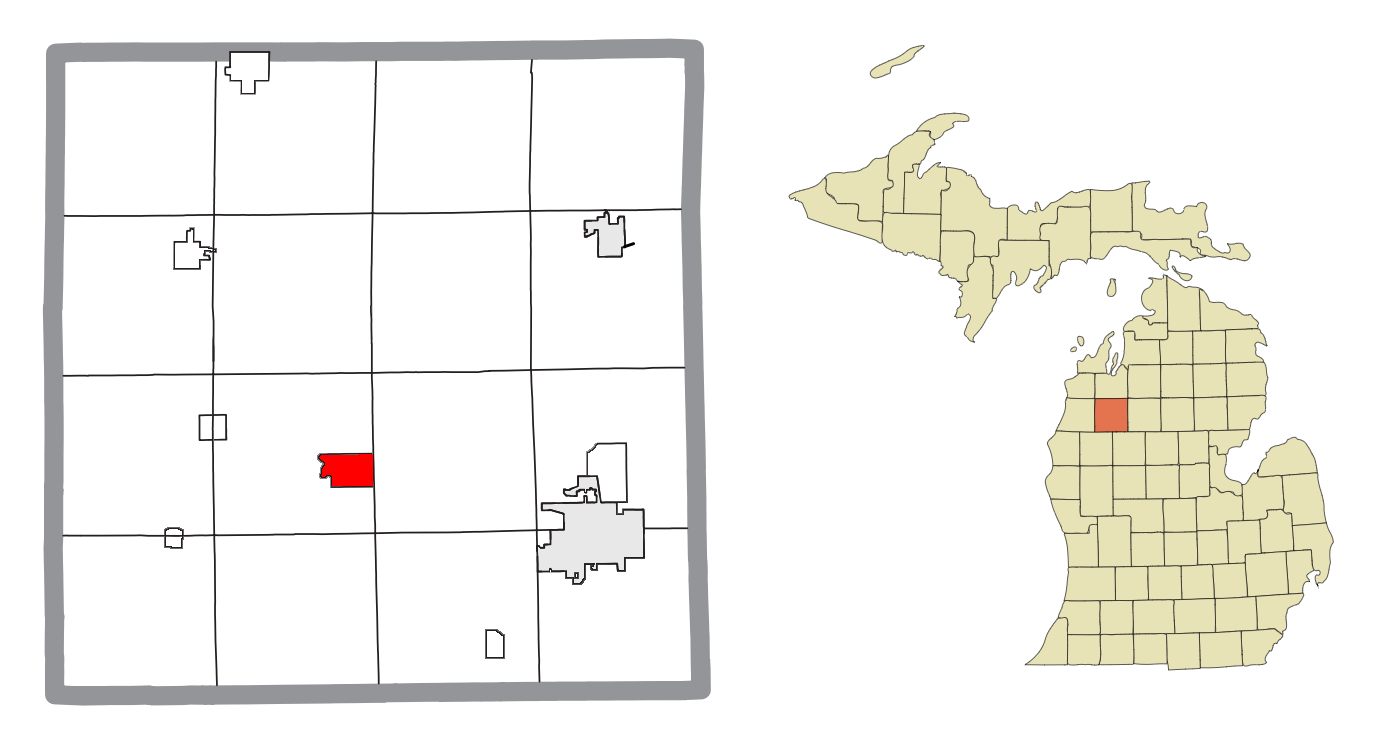
- Location within Wexford County

- Location within the state of Michigan Location within the United States
- Coordinates: 44°17′23″N 85°36′07″W
- Country: United States
- State: Michigan
- County: Wexford
- Township: Boon

Area
  - Total: 0.84 sq mi (2.18 km^{2})
  - Land: 0.84 sq mi (2.18 km^{2})
  - Water: 0 sq mi (0.00 km^{2})
- Elevation: 1,378 ft (420 m)

Population (2020)
  - Total: 90
  - Density: 107.1/sq mi (41.37/km^{2})
- Time zone: UTC-5 (Eastern (EST))
  - Summer (DST): UTC-4 (EDT)
- ZIP code(s): 49618
- Area code: 231
- GNIS feature ID: 1619282

Boon is an unincorporated community and census-designated place (CDP) in Wexford County in the U.S. state of Michigan. The community is located within Boon Township. The population of the CDP was 90 at the 2020 census.

As an unincorporated community, Boon has no legal autonomy of its own but does have its own post office with the 49618 ZIP Code.

== History ==
Prior to European settlement, the area that is now Boon was utilized by the Hopewell as a site for building mounds and circles, as well as for farming several species of corn, bean and squash. The area was located along what is now known as the Old Indian Trail, which was used to connect the Cadillac area to the Traverse City area.

Boon was first settled as early as 1888 as a station on the Toledo, Ann Arbor, and Northern Michigan Railroad. The community was platted in 1889 and received its first office on December 19, 1899.

The community of Boon was listed as a newly-organized census-designated place for the 2010 census, meaning it now has officially defined boundaries and population statistics for the first time.

== Geography ==
According to the U.S. Census Bureau, the community has an area of 0.84 square miles (2.18 km^{2}), all land.

== Demographics ==
Historical population
Census	Pop.	Note	%±
2010	167		—
2020	90		−46.1%
U.S. Decennial Census

== Education ==
The community of Boon is served by two separate school districts. Residents may attend Cadillac Area Public Schools in Cadillac to the southeast, while others might attend Mesick Consolidated Schools in Mesick to the northwest.

== Images ==
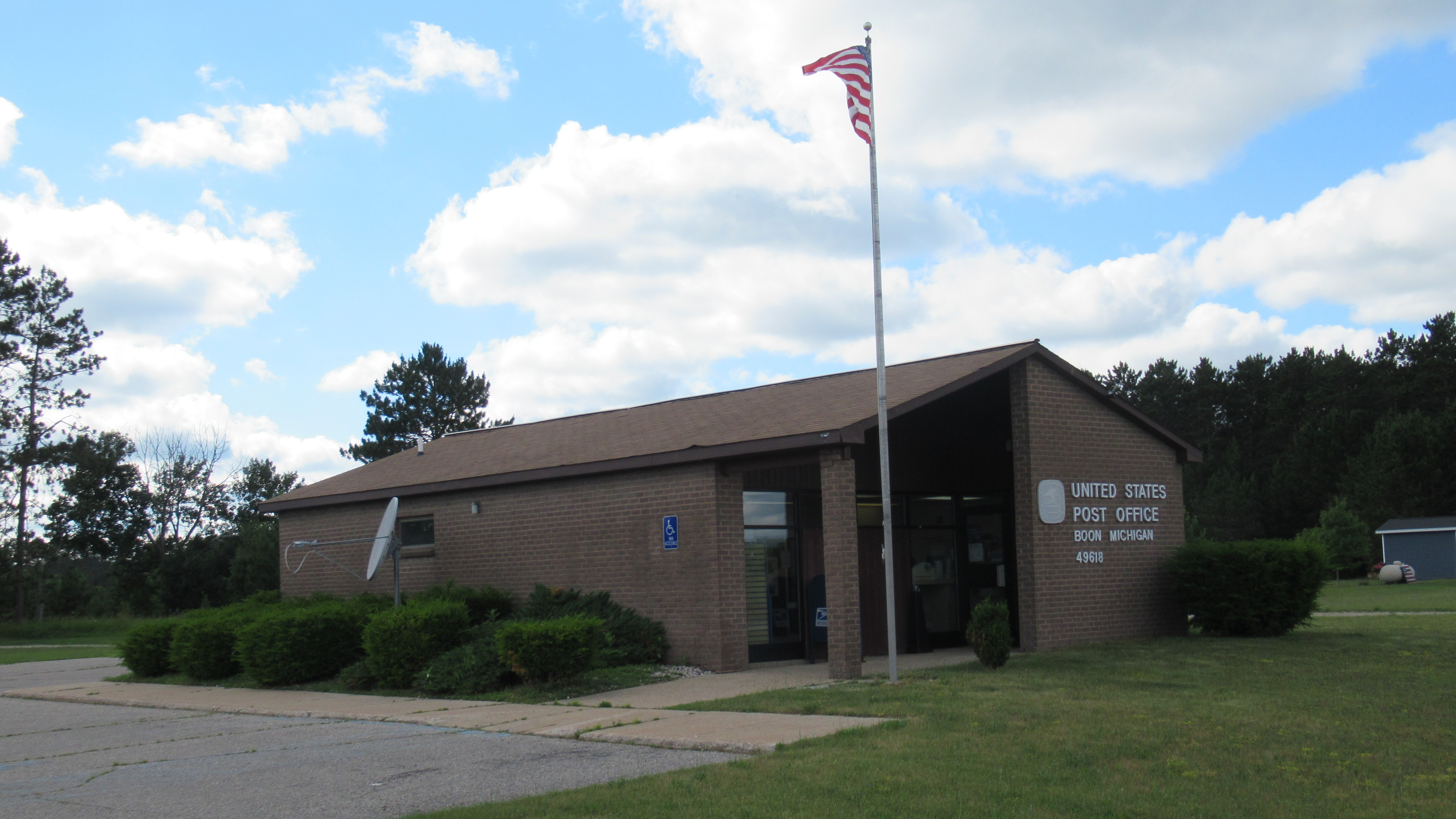
U.S. Post Office in Boon

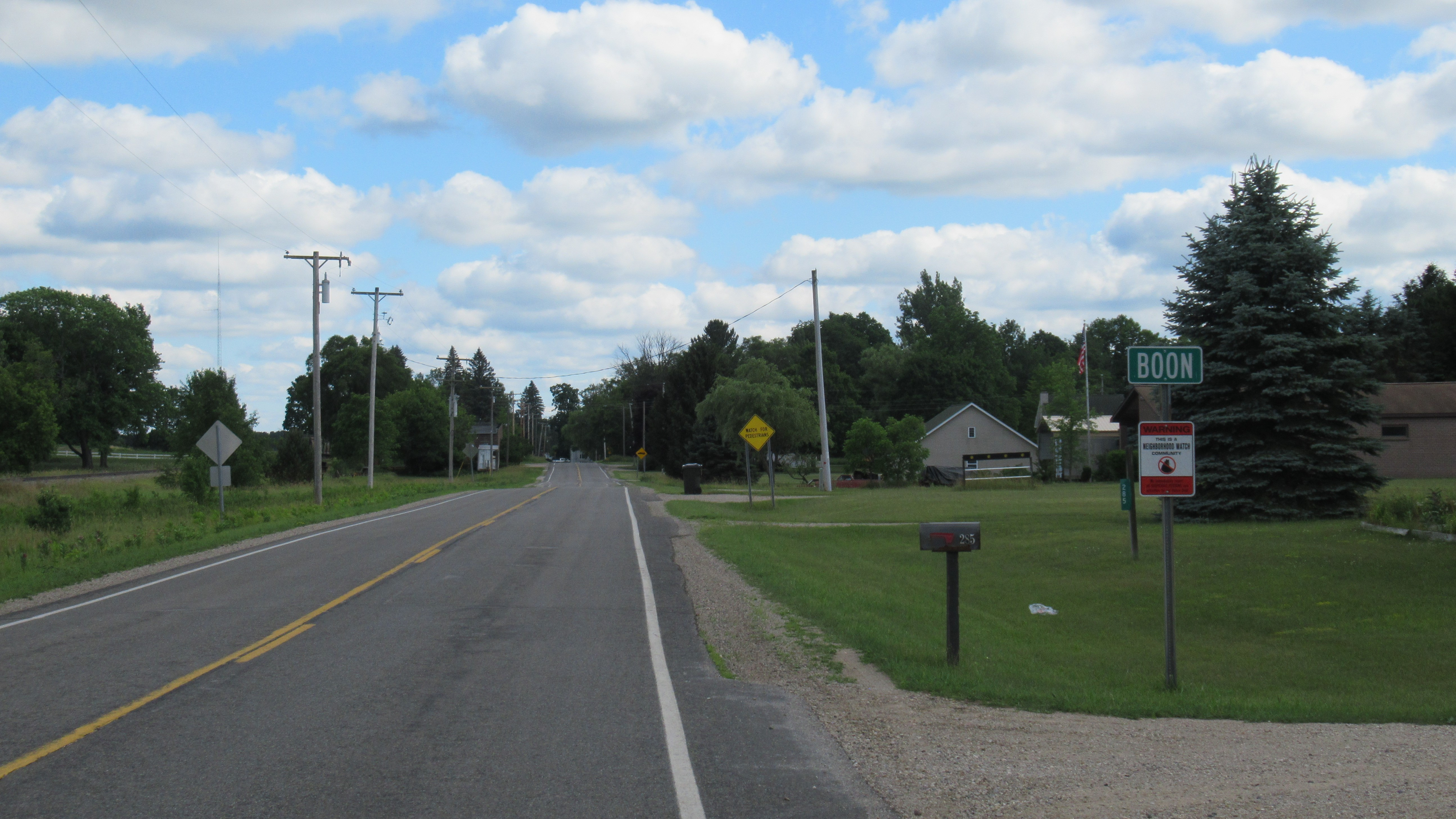
Road signage along South 23 Road

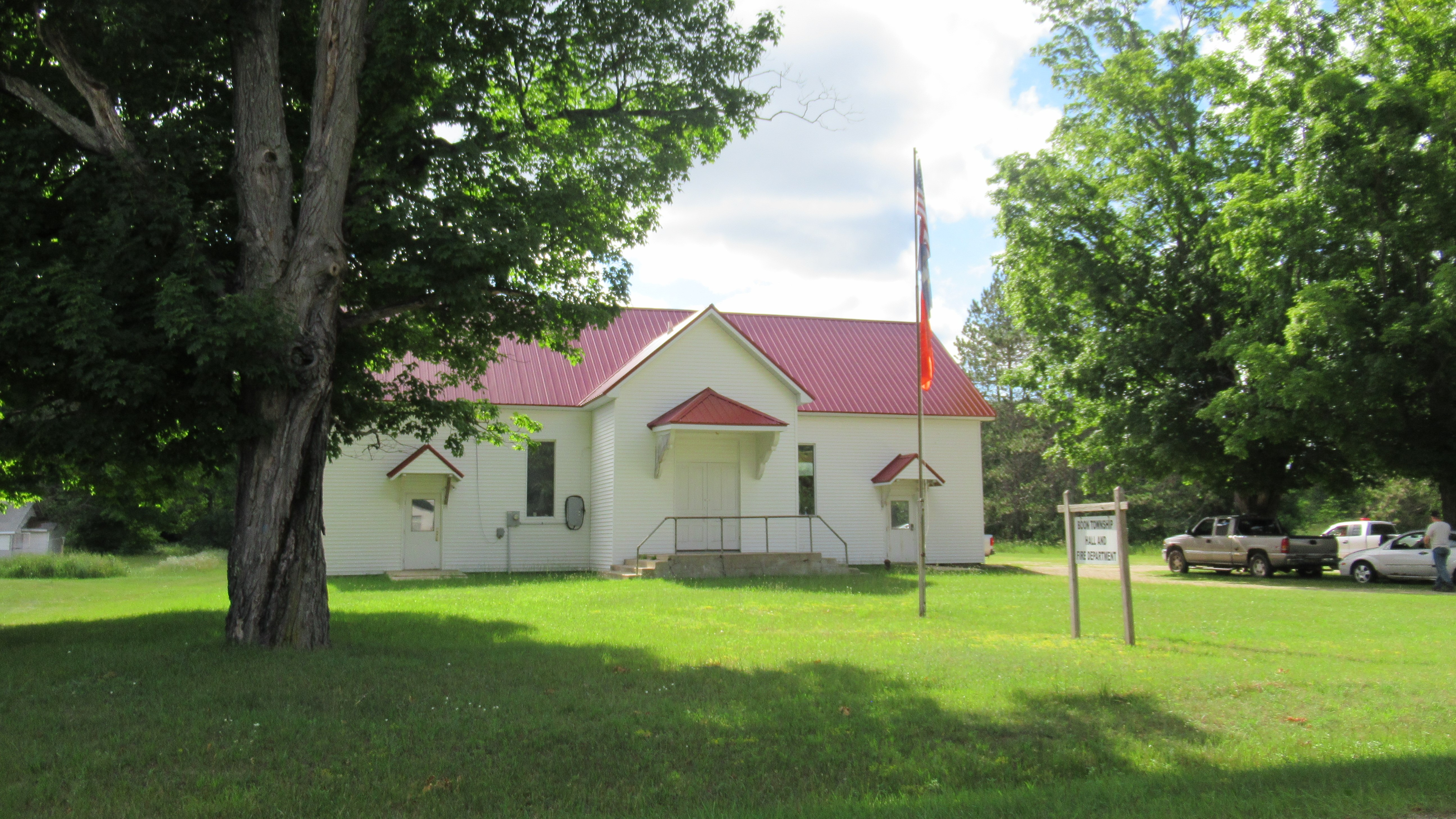
Boon Township Hall and Fire Department
