= Sylvia Ardyn Boone =

African-American art historian (1940–1993)

- Born: September 30, 1940
- Died: April 27, 1993 (aged 52); New Haven, Connecticut, U.S.
- Education: Brooklyn College (BA); Columbia University (MA); Yale University (PhD)

Sylvia Ardyn Boone (September 30, 1940 – April 27, 1993) was an African-American art historian specializing in African art, female imagery, women's arts and masks. In 1988, she became the first African-American woman to receive tenure at Yale University.

== Biography ==
Sylvia Ardyn Boone was born on September 30, 1940. She attended Brooklyn College as an undergraduate and received a graduate degree in social sciences from Columbia University.

After a period at the University of Ghana, she returned to the United States and earned degrees in art history at Yale University in the 1970s. Her doctoral dissertation won the Blanshard Prize in 1979.

She joined the faculty of Yale in 1979, and received tenure in 1988. Topics of her courses included African art and the aesthetics of female imagery in African art.

In 1989, Boone was active in the organization of the commemoration of the 150th anniversary of the 1839 Amistad Affair.

== Death and legacy ==
Boone died on April 27, 1993, of heart failure, at her home on campus in New Haven, Connecticut. In 1996, Yale University's History of Art and African and African-American Studies departments awarded the first Sylvia Ardyn Boone Prize. It has been awarded annually since then.

== Works ==
- West African Travels: A Guide to Peoples and Places in libraries (WorldCat catalog) (Random House, 1974)
- Radiance from the Waters: Ideals of Feminine Beauty in Mende Art in libraries (WorldCat catalog) (Yale University Press, 1986)
- Sowo Art in Sierra Leone: The Mind and Power of Woman on the Plane of the Aesthetic Disciplines in libraries (WorldCat catalog) (UMI Dissertation Services, 1997)
