= Tuscola Intermediate School District =

Intermediate school district in Michigan

Address
- 1385 Cleaver Road, Caro Tuscola County, Michigan; United States
- Coordinates: 43.50612°N 83.38897°W

District information
- Type: Public intermediate school district
- President: James Welke
- Vice-president: Nancy Laethem
- Superintendent: Eugene Pierce
- Schools: 1
- Budget: US$23,328,000 (2011-12)
- NCES District ID: 2680980

Students and staff
- Students: 395 (2013-14)
- Teachers: 50.56 (2013-14)
- Staff: 209.58 (2013-14)
- Student–teacher ratio: 7.81 (2013-14)

Other information
- Website: www.tisd.k12.mi.us

The Tuscola Intermediate School District (Tuscola ISD) is an intermediate school district in Michigan, headquartered in Caro.

Most of Tuscola County is served by the Tuscola Intermediate School District, which coordinates the efforts of local boards of education, but has no operating authority over schools. Local school boards in Michigan retain great autonomy over day-to-day operations.

== Governance ==
The Tuscola Intermediate School District is governed by a publicly elected board of education, which is responsible for hiring a superintendent.

== Composition ==
The Tuscola Intermediate School District includes public school districts and non-public schools.

=== Public school districts ===
As of the 2015–2016 school year, the communities of Tuscola County are served by the following members of the Tuscola Intermediate School District:

- Akron-Fairgrove Schools
- Caro Community Schools
- Cass City Public Schools
- Kingston Community Schools
- Mayville Community Schools
- Millington Community Schools
- Reese Public Schools
- Unionville-Sebewaing Area Schools
- Vassar Public Schools

=== Non-public schools ===
The Tuscola Intermediate School District includes non-public schools, including Deford Christian Academy and Juniata Christian School.

== See also ==
- List of intermediate school districts in Michigan
