= Wexford–Missaukee Intermediate School District =

Intermediate school district in Michigan

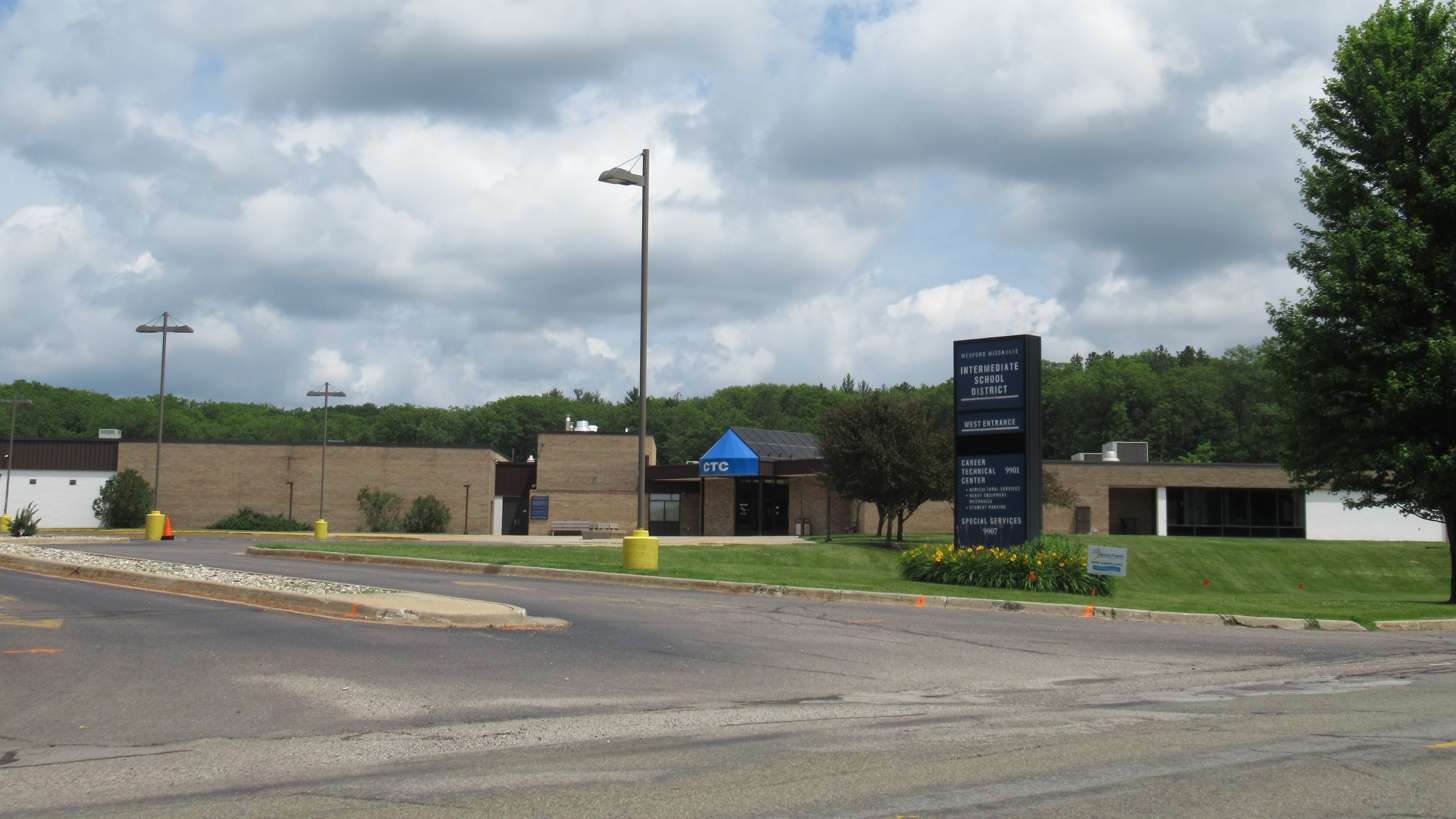
- West entrance along 36 Road

Address
- 9907 East 13th Street, Cadillac Missaukee and Wexford Counties; United States
- Coordinates: 44.26696°N 85.38268°W

District information
- Type: Public intermediate school district
- President: Bill Sparks
- Vice-president: Harold Kibbe
- Superintendent: Jeff Jennette
- Schools: 2
- Budget: US$17,535,000 (2011-12)
- NCES District ID: 2680000

Students and staff
- Students: 366 (2013-14)
- Teachers: 53.21 (2013-14)
- Staff: 119.52 (2013-14)
- Student–teacher ratio: 6.88 (2013-14)

Other information
- Website: www.wmisd.org

The Wexford–Missaukee Intermediate School District is an intermediate school district in Michigan, headquartered in Cadillac.

Most of Missaukee and Wexford Counties are served by the Wexford–Missaukee Intermediate School District, which coordinates the efforts of local boards of education, but has no operating authority over schools. Local school boards in Michigan retain great autonomy over day-to-day operations.

== Composition ==
The Wexford–Missaukee Intermediate School District includes many public school districts and private schools.

== Governance ==
The Wexford–Missaukee Intermediate School District is governed by a publicly elected board of education, who is responsible for hiring a superintendent to serve as the chief administrative officer of the agency.

=== Primary school districts ===
As of the 2015–2016 school year, the following communities are served by the following members of the Wexford–Missaukee Intermediate School District:

- Cadillac Area Public Schools
- Lake City Area Schools
- Manton Consolidated Schools
- Marion Public Schools
- McBain Rural Agricultural School
- Mesick Consolidated Schools
- Pine River Area Schools

=== Additional school districts ===
The Wexford–Missaukee Intermediate School District also provides services to additional schools and districts, including:

- Bear Lake School District
- Cadillac Heritage Christian School
- Crawford AuSable School District
- Kaleva Norman Dickson School District
- Northern Michigan Christian School
- Roscommon Area Public Schools

== See also ==
- List of intermediate school districts in Michigan
