= Ingham Intermediate School District =

Regional educational service agency in Michigan, US

Address
- 2630 West Howell Road Mason, Ingham (primary), and portions of six surrounding counties, Michigan, 48854; United States

District information
- Type: Public intermediate school district
- Motto: "Lead and Serve for the Achievement and Success of All Learners"
- Grades: PK–12
- Established: 1962
- Schools: 12 (directly operated)
- Budget: $39,500,000 (2025–26)
- NCES District ID: 2680520
- Affiliation: Michigan Association of Intermediate School Administrators (MAISA)
- Enrollment: 44,000+ (served students, 2023–24)

Other information
- Website: inghamisd.org

The Ingham Intermediate School District (Ingham ISD) is a regional educational service agency headquartered in Mason, Michigan, serving Ingham County and portions of six surrounding counties in the U.S. state of Michigan. It is one of 56 intermediate school districts in Michigan, a tier of public educational governance created by the Michigan Legislature in 1962 under Public Act 190, which reorganized the state's existing 83 county school districts into the new intermediate school district structure.

Ingham ISD serves twelve public school districts, ten public school academies, and more than 44,000 students across its service area, with a total staff of 661.27 full-time equivalents as of the 2024–25 school year. Many staff members work directly in local schools and community settings rather than at the main campus. The main campus is located at 2630 West Howell Road in Mason, at the corner of Howell Road and Hagadorn Road, just east of US-127. The agency's mission is to "lead and serve for the achievement and success of all learners."

== History ==
Michigan's system of intermediate school districts was created in 1962 by Public Act 190, which took the state's existing 83 county school districts and reorganized them under the new name of "intermediate school districts." The legislation established ISDs as separate taxing units with elected boards of education, tasked with providing administrative and instructional services to local school districts that individual districts could not efficiently provide on their own. All Michigan ISDs have elected board members; however, unlike local school district boards, many ISD boards are chosen by the board members of each constituent local school district within their borders rather than by direct popular election.

The Michigan Association of Intermediate School Administrators (MAISA), which represents all 56 Michigan ISDs, describes the 1962 legislation as establishing agencies designed to "maximize resources for K–12 districts by providing shared operational services," train teachers and support staff, pilot innovative programs, and coordinate special education and other specialized services across regions. In 1989, the Michigan Legislature allowed some ISDs to be renamed as Regional Educational Service Agencies or Educational Service Agencies to better reflect their missions, though Ingham retained the ISD designation.

Ingham ISD has operated out of its Mason campus since its founding, growing alongside the Lansing metropolitan area to serve an increasingly diverse population. The agency's annual revenue stood at approximately $39.5 million in 2026, reflecting decades of growth in programming. In 2004, member district superintendents formalized regional collaboration through the Superintendents' Round Table, a structure that continues to convene monthly during the school year. In the 2022–23 school year, Ingham ISD marked the 50th anniversary of CTE programming at the Wilson Talent Center.

== Member districts ==
Ingham ISD serves twelve constituent public school districts, all primarily within Ingham County, though some boundaries extend into neighboring counties. All twelve districts have historically participated in Michigan's Schools of Choice program, which allows students to enroll in districts outside their home district, though participation is not mandated and varies by district. The Superintendents' Round Table includes the superintendent from each of the following districts:

District	Headquarters
Dansville Schools	Dansville, MI
East Lansing Public Schools	East Lansing, MI
Haslett Public Schools	Haslett, MI
Holt Public Schools	Holt, MI
Lansing School District	Lansing, MI
Leslie Public Schools	Leslie, MI
Mason Public Schools	Mason, MI
Okemos Public Schools	Okemos, MI
Stockbridge Community Schools	Stockbridge, MI
Waverly Community Schools	Lansing, MI
Webberville Community Schools	Webberville, MI
Williamston Community Schools	Williamston, MI

In addition, the agency serves ten public school academies (charter schools) operating within its service area.

== Programs and services ==
MAISA describes ISDs statewide as providing services including special education, vocational training, interdisciplinary subjects, language programs, early childhood education, parent services, transportation, and adult education — delivered across districts as a shared resource to make specialized programming affordable where it otherwise would not be feasible. Ingham ISD organizes its programming across several broad areas described below.

=== Early childhood services ===
Ingham ISD operates a suite of early childhood programs serving children from birth through pre-kindergarten age. The Early On Michigan program provides federally mandated early intervention services free of charge to infants and toddlers ages 0–3 with developmental delays or disabilities, with evaluations covering vision, hearing, motor skills, speech and language, and social-emotional development. For children ages 3–5, Early Childhood Special Education services are offered under the Individuals with Disabilities Education Act (IDEA, Part B, Section 619), providing free and appropriate public education in the least restrictive environment to eligible children with qualifying disabilities. Additional programs include the Great Parents Great Start home visiting initiative, the Build Up Michigan kindergarten readiness program, and the PreK for All preschool access initiative.

=== Special education ===
Special education administration and coordination is one of Ingham ISD's core statutory responsibilities. The agency provides program oversight and coordination across all twelve member districts, ensuring compliance with federal and state mandates. The Lansing School District, Ingham ISD's largest member, describes adult transition services as coordinated directly with Ingham ISD and community agencies for students obtaining a certificate of completion, and credits Ingham ISD's coordination for a range of related services including speech-language pathology, school social work, occupational therapy, and physical therapy. In recent years, Ingham ISD pursued a Special Education Facilities Bond to upgrade physical spaces for special education programming, including the Beekman and Heartwood facilities.

=== Career and technical education – Wilson Talent Center ===
The Wilson Talent Center (WTC), operated by Ingham ISD and located in Mason, is the agency's flagship career and technical education (CTE) facility for high school students. The WTC offers 20 programs across 12 career clusters to juniors and seniors from all twelve member districts — Dansville, East Lansing, Haslett, Holt, Leslie, Mason, Okemos, Stockbridge, Waverly, Webberville, and Williamston — with applications also accepted from Lansing School District, Fowlerville Community Schools, and schools in Eaton and Clinton counties. Students attend the WTC for half of each school day, earning up to three high school credits, free college credit, and state or national industry certifications, while completing required coursework at their home district for the other half. Programs span career pathways in healthcare, skilled trades, information technology, culinary arts, criminal justice, manufacturing, and hospitality, among others.

Ingham ISD has offered CTE programming continuously since the early 1970s; the 2022–23 school year marked its 50th year of operation. The CTE February 2022 newsletter noted that statewide, 96% of Michigan high school students enrolled in CTE programs graduated that year, compared to Michigan's overall graduation rate of 81%, and cited the CTE Executive Director's observation that more than half the jobs in Michigan require skills training beyond a high school diploma but less than a four-year degree. The WTC's programs are also listed through the Capital Region Technical Early College (CRTEC), a dual enrollment pathway that allows students to earn college credit while still in high school.

=== Ingham Academy ===
Ingham Academy is an alternative high school operated by Ingham ISD in partnership with Highfields and the Ingham County Circuit Court, located at 1601 W. Holmes Road in Lansing. Founded in 2007 with two classrooms and 20 students in the Grady Porter Building in downtown Lansing, the school has grown to serve students in grades 8–12 at its current Holmes Road location, with an enrollment of approximately 40 students as of 2024–25 and school colors of black and blue. The school focuses on educating at-risk youth through the Michigan academic curriculum alongside life skills needed for productive citizenship.

=== Spartan Project SEARCH ===
In October 2024, in partnership with Michigan State University, Ingham ISD launched Spartan Project SEARCH, a transition program placing young adults with intellectual and developmental disabilities into year-long unpaid internship rotations at Michigan State University facilities, combined with classroom instruction in employability and independent living skills. Project SEARCH is a nationally recognized transition model; for Michigan's graduating class of 2024, 67.2% of Project SEARCH graduates statewide were employed for at least 16 hours per week at wages comparable to non-disabled peers performing the same jobs — approximately three times the overall employment rate for people with disabilities. Ingham ISD Project SEARCH instructor Brooke Locher has noted the importance of not "pigeonholing" students with disabilities into certain roles, emphasizing individualized placement across diverse job settings. The Michigan Legislature included $1 million for Project SEARCH in the 2024 state budget, though ongoing funding has been subject to advocacy efforts.

=== Instructional and district support services ===
Beyond direct student programming, Ingham ISD provides a broad range of support to member school districts, including professional development, instructional coaching, gifted and talented programming, arts education, data systems and analysis, information technology services, pupil accounting and truancy support, transportation coordination, human resources support, and business and finance services. The agency also administers Medicaid billing support and the REMCSave cooperative purchasing program for member districts. In 2025, Ingham ISD launched a dedicated artificial intelligence resource section providing guidance for educators, families, and administrators on AI use in educational settings.

== Academics ==
Niche ranks Ingham ISD #23 among the best places to teach in Michigan and #29 among Michigan school districts overall, based on government data and community reviews. U.S. News & World Report data for the district records a minority enrollment of 60%, with the student body composed of approximately 42% white, 24.2% Black, 15.9% Hispanic or Latino, 5.7% Asian or Pacific Islander, 11.8% two or more races, and 0.4% American Indian or Alaska Native students. The district's student-to-teacher ratio is 27:1 for its directly operated schools, and 45% of directly enrolled students scored at or above proficiency in math, with 65% at or above proficiency in reading, on state assessments.

== Governance ==
Ingham ISD is governed by a locally elected Board of Education that sets policy, approves budgets, and provides strategic direction for the agency. Board meetings are open to the public; meeting notices, agendas, and briefs are published on the agency's official website, and the board maintains a published strategic plan. The Superintendents' Round Table convenes all twelve member district superintendents and the Ingham ISD superintendent monthly during the school year to discuss shared concerns and coordinate regional initiatives — a structure formalized in 2004.

As a publicly funded agency, Ingham ISD is subject to Michigan's transparency requirements under MCL 380.620 (Public Act 413 of 2004), which require ISDs to post specific financial and programmatic information on their websites annually by December 31. There are 56 ISDs or regional educational service agencies in Michigan, each structured individually based on the specific needs of its constituent districts and community; no two are exactly alike.

== See also ==
- Mason, Michigan
- Ingham County, Michigan
- Intermediate school district
- Michigan Department of Education
- Michigan Association of Intermediate School Administrators
- Haslett Public Schools
- Lansing School District
- East Lansing School District
- Okemos Public Schools
- Ingham Academy High School (Michigan)
- List of intermediate school districts in Michigan
