= Hopkins High School (disambiguation) =

Hopkins High School may refer to:

- Hopkins High School, Minnetonka, Minnesota
- Hopkins High School (Michigan), Hopkins, Michigan
- North Hopkins High School, Birthright, Texas
- Hopkins West Junior High School, Minnetonka, Minnesota
- Madisonville North Hopkins High School, Madisonville, Kentucky

== See also ==
- Hopkins School
- Hopkins Public Schools (disambiguation)
