= Administrative divisions of Michigan =

Human settlement in United States of America

The state of Michigan is largely divided in the same way as many other U.S. states, but is distinct in its usage of charter townships. Michigan ranks 13th among the fifty states in terms of the number of local governmental entities.

The state is divided into 83 counties, and further divided into 1,240 townships, 280 cities, and 253 villages. Additionally, the state consists of 553 school districts, 57 intermediate school districts, 14 planning and development regions, and over 300 special districts and authorities.

== County ==
Michigan is divided into 83 counties, the primary administrative division of Michigan. This local government division has its greatest effect on unincorporated lands within the county, and can provide service which can include law enforcement, justice administration, health care, among other basic services. Where places within the county are incorporated, and thus granted home rule, the power of the county government is greatly diminished.

The government of the state's counties is generally structured as county board of commissioners, which function as the legislative body of the county with some executive powers with several elected executive officers as required by the state constitution from the sheriff, county clerk, county treasurer, register of deeds, and prosecuting attorney.

With few exceptions, most local government services in Michigan are provided at the city or township level. County governments are limited mostly to operating the local criminal justice system, maintaining vital records and partnering with the state in providing social services.

County government in Michigan has very limited autonomy, as they lacked general police power. Notably, county governments do not have general ordinance-making powers granted to the municipalities, meaning that they can not pass regulations or laws contrary to those of the state or municipal governments.

=== Types and forms of government ===
Counties are organized into three types or options: general law, optional unified, and charter, and six forms: county board of commissioners, county administrator, county controller, county manager, county executive, and chief administrative officer. The type of government dictates the form of government.

==== General law counties ====
A general law county is governed under general law in which the county board of commissioners shares executive and legislative functions with other county-wide elected and appointed officials. Most general law counties operate under a regular board of commissioners form of government in which the board shares executive functions with an elected county treasurer and clerk, but performs all other executive functions. But they may operate under a county administrator or a county controller form of government in which a county administrator or county controller carries out many of the day-to-day functions of the government. In either case, these appointed officials serve at the pleasure of the board. The differences between the county administrator and county controller form is that it requires a 2/3 majority to dismiss a controller but only a simple majority to dismiss an administrator. General law counties are the most numerous; 79 of the state's 83 counties are governed under the general law form with 61 choosing an administrator or a county controller option.

==== Optional unified counties ====
An optional unified form of county government is organized under Public Act 139 of 1973 in which a county board of commissioners shares executive functions with either an appointed county manager (Unified form, Alternate A) or an elected county executive (Unified form, Alternate B). Differences between these two options include that a county manager is a bureaucrat who serves at the pleasure of the board, while a county executive is a political official who serves for a term set by law; also, only a county executive has veto power. PA 139 also requires any county reorganizing under this act the creation of certain boards, commissions, authorities, and elective offices, while also requiring the abolition of others that may exist prior to reorganization of the county government. The optional unified form of government centralizes and streamlines the administrative structure of the county, but provides for less administrative flexibility than either general law or charter counties.

Bay County and Oakland County operate under the optional unified type of government, and both have chosen the Alternate B county executive form of government.

==== Charter counties ====
A charter county is organized under Public 293 of 1966 (amended in 1980) which permits a county to exercise limited home rule under a charter. The charter form of government is the most flexible of the three forms of county government. For counties whose population is at least 1,500,000, the proposal submitted to the electorate for reorganization as a charter county must provide for two alternative officers:

- a county executive elected on a partisan basis;
- a chief administrative officer selected by the board of commissioners for a four-year term who may only be removed by a 2/3 majority of the board.

The major difference between the two options is that the elected county executive has veto power. The proposed options may also differ in how the county executive or chief administrative officer is removed. For counties whose population is less than 1,500,000, only the elected county executive alternative is permitted. In all counties organized under the charter form of government, the county board of commissioners must have no fewer than 5 members and no more than 21 members. Unlike in the general law or optional unified counties, the size of the board in a charter county is not additionally limited in size by the population of the county.

Macomb County and Wayne County operate under the charter form of government, and both have chosen the county executive option.

=== Road commissions ===
While considered a part of the county government in Michigan, the county road commission is a separate independent unit of government from the general county government. A county road commission may be dissolved and its powers, duties, and functions transferred to general county government either by a resolution of the county board of commissioners in counties which have appointed road commissioners or by an election in counties with elected road commissioners. A board of county road commissioners consists of three or five members either elected or appointed by the county board of commissioners. Road commissions are responsible for snow removal, maintaining road, bridge and roadside ditches.

== City ==
The city is one of two types of incorporated municipality, the other being the village. Of the three types of local government, cities are the most autonomous type as they all have some level of home rule. Upon incorporation a city is withdrawn from the township(s) in which it was incorporated. Cities report to the state through the county or counties in which they are located but they are not subject to county oversight. Cities also have the most delegated responsibilities and duties of any municipality having more things they shall do than may do.

As of 2016, there are 280 incorporated cities in Michigan of which 275 have a regular charter, one a special charter, and four a fourth class charter (Harrisville, Omer, Sandusky, and Yale).

=== Types and forms of government ===
Cities may choose between a mayor-council form of government, a city commission form of government, or a council-manager form of government depending upon their type.

==== Home rule cities ====
Home rule cities are the most numerous in Michigan. Upon the enactment of the Home Rule Cities Act in 1909, all new cities were required to incorporate under this streamlined process, which allowed for a framework for incorporation and for a city to enact and amend its own charter without an act of the state legislature. To incorporate as a home rule city the area seeking incorporation must have a population of at least 2,000 and 500 people per square mile, though a 1931 amendment allowed existing villages within that population range to incorporate as cities without the population density requirement.

Prior to the Home Rule Cities Act existed the option of incorporating as fourth class cities. Settlements could incorporate as fourth class cities under the Fourth Class City Act of 1895. A settlement seeking to incorporate under this act had to have populations between 3,000 and 10,000 to incorporate. They were required to have a weak mayor-council form of government in which the mayor could only appoint certain city officers with the council's consent, and the city clerk was required to be an elected position. Fourth class cities were also required to publish their annual financial report in a local newspaper. Because of the lack of flexibility, all but a handful of fourth class cities have reincorporated as regular charter cities. All remaining cities that have not yet reincorporated as home rule cities became home rule fourth class cities upon the Public Act 334 of 1976, which allowed fourth class cities to continue to exist by making the Fourth Class Cities Act the charter for this type of city.

As part of the Home Rule Cities Act, a provision was made for the incorporation of fifth class cities. The provision was added to allow for villages that weren't large enough under the provisions of the main act to become home rule cities. The only difference between a fifth-class city and a regular home rule city was that settlements only had to have a population between 750 and 2,000 with a density of 500 people per square mile - though the density requirement was waived for settlements which had already incorporated as villages - and that all elected officials had to be elected at-large. No fifth class cities currently exist.

==== Special charter cities ====
All cities incorporated by act of the state legislature before the enactment of the Fourth Class City Act of 1895 became "special charter cities" upon its enactment. These cities were governed by the charters enacted directly by the state legislature, and all changes to these cities charters had to be amended by the legislature. All but one these cities has since re-incorporated under the Home Rule Cities Act: Mackinac Island.

== Villages ==
Villages are the second kind of incorporated place in Michigan. Unlike cities, villages are not completely administratively autonomous of the townships in which they are located, reducing their home rule powers. Because of this, statistically, their population is also included in the population of the township in which they reside. Village governments are required to share some of the responsibilities and duties to their residents with the township. Hence, village residents pay both township and village taxes.

As of 2016, there are 253 villages in Michigan, of which 46 are designated home rule villages, and 207 as general law villages.

=== Types and forms of government ===
All villages are required to have a weak mayor-council form of government. The legislative body is a village council composed of elected trustees. An elected village president serves as president of the council. Other elected village officers are a clerk and a treasurer.

==== General law villages ====
General law villages are governed under the provisions of the General Law Village Act of 1895, which provide a framework for the governance of villages in Michigan, which like cities had formerly been incorporated by acts of the state legislature. The act brought all existing villages under its provisions eliminating their special act status. General law villages can make basic changes to their local laws, but are prohibited from changing their form of government. While the act has provisions for governance of a general law village, the Home Rule Villages Act of 1909 superseded the General Law Village Act of 1895 as it related to the incorporation of villages. Thus, all settlements seeking to become villages must first incorporate as home rule villages, and can then choose to adopt the provisions of the General Law Village Act as their charter.

General law village must have a president elected by the village electors, but can have an appointed clerk and treasurer instead of an elected clerk and treasurer. The village council may establish additional officers of the village such as a village manager, who is appointed by the president with the council's consent. Besides the president, clerk and treasurer the village council may have either four or six trustees with six as the default number. Villages under the act elect three trustees annually for two-year terms with a president elected annually. However, they have the option to elected three trustees biennially for four-year terms or all six biennially for two-year terms. Reducing the number of trustees to four, appointing the clerk and treasurer or creating the position of village manager takes a village ordinance approved by a two-thirds majority of the council subject to referendum. Additional village boards, both appointed and ex officio, can include the boards of registration, election commissioners, election inspectors and cemetery trustees.

==== Home rule villages ====
Home rule villages are governed and incorporated under the Home Rule Village Act of 1909. Like home rule cities, the act provides a framework for a home rule village to create and amend its charter giving them more flexibility than general law villages. For any settlement to incorporate as a village, be it home rule or general, it must have a population of at least 150 and have a population density of at least 100 people per square mile.

Home rule villages must have an elected president, clerk and legislative body and indicate the election or appointment of other essential officers and boards. However unlike general law villages, the president in a home rule village may be elected by the village legislative body from its own ranks instead of being directly elected by the village electors. Other than these basic requirements, home rule village governments vary greatly in structure and size.

== Township ==
In Michigan, townships are a statutory unit of local government, meaning that they have only those powers expressly granted by state law, any power fairly implied by state law, and those powers essential to the township's existence. They are the most basic form of local government in Michigan, and should be distinguished from survey townships. All Michigan residents who do not live in an incorporated city live in a township. As of May 2024, there were 1,240 civil townships, divided into general law townships with the basic powers of local government, and charter townships with somewhat superior authority and privileges.

=== Types and forms of government ===
All townships function under a weak mayor-council form of government, and must have an elected supervisor, clerk, treasurer and a number of trustees.

==== General law township ====
General law townships form the majority of civil townships in Michigan; these offer the most basic of services, and generally follow the boundary lines of survey townships. In sparsely populated areas of Northern Michigan and the Upper Peninsula, a township may consist of several survey townships and cover hundreds of square miles. In other areas of the state, townships are typically the 36 square miles (93 km^{2}) of land of a single survey township, or less, due to city formation, irregular geographical boundaries, or when one survey township has been subdivided into two or more civil townships.

A general law township is governed by a board of trustees composed of a township supervisor, clerk, treasurer and either 2 or 4 trustees. In this form of government which combines executive and legislative functions, the township supervisor is the presiding and chief executive officer of the township board and is simply "first among equals" on the board.

==== Charter township ====
A unique form of civil township in Michigan is the charter township, a status created by act of the state legislature in 1947, which grants additional powers and streamlined administration of townships. Charter townships that meet certain criteria are also provided greater protection against annexation by a city or village. Townships must have at least 2,000 residents before they can seek charter status. The means by which a charter is approved affects a charter township's taxing ability. If township voters approve the charter status, the township may levy up to 5 mills without voter approval. If the charter status is approved by the township board alone, the township board may not levy any millage beyond that allowed for general law townships without voter approval. As of April 2001, there were 127 charter townships in Michigan.

A charter township is governed by a board of trustees composed of a township supervisor, clerk, treasurer and 4 trustees. A significant difference in the form of government between a charter township and general law township is that a charter township may appoint a township superintendent as the township's chief administrative officer (CAO) who is delegated specific duties and responsibilities by law. If a charter township does not appoint a superintendent it can employ a township manager as the township's CAO, however, the township manager only has duties and responsibilities directly delegated to it by the township board of trustees.

==== Michigan Townships Association ====
The Michigan Townships Association (MTA) is a non-profit organization that is one of the largest local government associations in the United States. The MTA was formed in 1953 and now claims nearly 99% of Michigan's 1,242 townships as members.

== Special units ==
Special districts and other public bodies may be set up as authorized by the legislation required by the State Constitution Article VIII sections 27 (Metropolitan governments and authorities) and 28 (cooperative agreements). The primary laws passed under sections 28 was the Urban Cooperation Act 7 of 1967 (Ex. Sess.) that allow cooperative agreements between existing municipalities to form joint governmental bodies to operate a share governmental function.

- Beecher Metropolitan Water and Sewer District
- Education Achievement Authority (interlocal agreement school system)
- Karegnondi Water Authority
- Swartz Creek Area Fire Department
- South Kalamazoo County Fire Authority
