= Marble Elementary School =

Marble Elementary School may refer to the school in:

- East Lansing Public Schools
- Cherokee County Schools (North Carolina)
