= Manistee Intermediate School District =

Intermediate school district in Michigan

Address
- 772 East Parkdale Avenue, Manistee Manistee County, Michigan; United States
- Coordinates: 44.27011°N 86.28740°W

District information
- Type: Public intermediate school district
- President: Mary Becker-Witt
- Vice-president: Margaret Cloutier
- Superintendent: Jeff Jennette
- Schools: 1
- Budget: US$5,023,000 (2011-12)
- NCES District ID: 2680740

Students and staff
- Students: 42 (2013-14)
- Teachers: 14.95 (2013-14)
- Staff: 49.20 (2013-14)
- Student–teacher ratio: 2.81 (2013-14)

Other information
- Website: www.manistee.org

The Manistee Intermediate School District (Manistee ISD) is an intermediate school district in Michigan, headquartered in Manistee.

Most of Manistee County is served by the Manistee Intermediate School District, which coordinates the efforts of local boards of education, but has no operating authority over schools. Local school boards in Michigan retain great autonomy over day-to-day operations.

== Governance ==
The Manistee Intermediate School District is governed by a publicly elected board of education, who is responsible for hiring a superintendent.

== Composition ==
The Manistee Intermediate School District includes four public school districts, one charter school, two private schools, and one community college.

=== Public school districts ===
As of the 2015–2016 school year, the communities of Manistee County are served by the following members of the Manistee Intermediate School District:

- Bear Lake Schools
- Kaleva Norman Dickson Schools
- Manistee Area Public Schools
- Onekama Consolidated Schools

=== Charter school ===
The Manistee Intermediate School District includes the Casman Alternative Academy charter school.

=== Private schools ===
The Manistee Intermediate School District includes two private schools, including Catholic Central High School.

=== Community college ===
The Manistee Intermediate School District includes West Shore Community College.

== See also ==
- List of intermediate school districts in Michigan
