= Washtenaw Intermediate School District =

Intermediate school district in Michigan

Address
- 1735 South Wagner Road, Ann Arbor Washtenaw County, Michigan; United States
- Coordinates: 42.26027°N 83.79893°W

District information
- Type: Public intermediate school district
- Established: 1962
- President: R. Stephen Olsen
- Vice-president: Diane B. Hockett
- Superintendent: Naomi Norman
- Schools: 8
- Budget: US$34,114,000 (2011-12)
- NCES District ID: 2680990

Students and staff
- Students: 1,112 (2013-14)
- Teachers: 87.56 (2013-14)
- Staff: 434.99 (2013-14)
- Student–teacher ratio: 12.70 (2013-14)

Other information
- Website: washtenawisd.org

The Washtenaw Intermediate School District (Washtenaw ISD) is an intermediate school district in Michigan, headquartered in Ann Arbor.

Most of Washtenaw County is served by the Washtenaw Intermediate School District, which coordinates the efforts of local boards of education, but has no operating authority over schools. Local school boards in Michigan retain great autonomy over day-to-day operations.

== History ==
The Washtenaw Intermediate School District was formed in 1962 when the State of Michigan created intermediate school districts. Its first superintendent was Julius Haab. The ISD offices were located in the county building and then temporarily at 130 South First in Ann Arbor until construction of a service center on Wagner Road in Ann Arbor was completed in 1969.

The High Point School was completed in 1974 after a bond to build the facility and support expanded services for the ISD was passed approved by voters in 1971.

In 1987, a bond was approved by voters to remodel High Point School and the Teaching and Learning Center, which were rededicated in 1992.

In 1993, voters approved an increase in the special education operating millage to support the ISD's increased programming for students with special needs. A seven-year increase in the millage was approved by voters in 2004.

The ISD led the 2012 to 2013 consolidation of the Willow Run Community Schools and Ypsilanti Public Schools into the Ypsilanti Community Schools.

== Governance ==
The Washtenaw Intermediate School District is governed by a publicly elected board of education, who is responsible for hiring a superintendent.

=== Superintendent ===
The Washtenaw Intermediate School District has had seven superintendents, who serve as the chief administrative officer of the agency.

- Julius Haab
- Nick A. Ianni
- Dr. Michael O. Emlaw
- Dr. William Miller
- Richard Leyshock (interim)
- Scott A. Menzel
- Naomi Norman

== Composition ==
The Washtenaw Intermediate School District includes many public school districts, academies, and facilities.

=== Public school districts ===
As of the 2015–2016 school year, the communities of Washtenaw County are served by the following members of the Washtenaw Intermediate School District:

- Ann Arbor Public Schools
- Chelsea School District
- Dexter Community Schools
- Lincoln Consolidated Schools
- Manchester Community Schools
- Milan Area Schools
- Saline Area Schools
- Whitmore Lake Public Schools
- Ypsilanti Community Schools

=== Academies and facilities ===
The Washtenaw Intermediate School District includes academies and facilities, including:

- Ann Arbor Learning Community
- Arbor Preparatory High School
- Central Academy
- Honey Creek Community School
- Washtenaw Technical Middle College

== See also ==
- List of intermediate school districts in Michigan
