= WISD =

WISD is an acronym that may refer to:

- Independent School Districts in Texas - W
- Washtenaw Intermediate School District
- Weidenfeld Institute for Strategic Dialogue
- Wine Industry Smoke Detector; pronounced Wizard!
