= Livingston Educational Service Agency =

Location
- Livingston County, Michigan US-MI United States
- Coordinates: 42.61242°N 83.95276°W

District information
- Type: Public intermediate school district
- Established: 1962
- President: LuAnn Loy
- Vice-president: Donald K. Cortez
- Superintendent: R. Michael Hubert, Ed.D
- Schools: 1
- Budget: US$39,708,000 (2010-11)
- NCES District ID: 2680700

Students and staff
- Students: 548 (2012-13)
- Teachers: 42.00 (2012-13)
- Staff: 477.32 (2012-13)
- Student–teacher ratio: 13.05 (2012-13)

Other information
- Website: www.livingstonesa.org

The Livingston Educational Service Agency (LESD) is an intermediate school district in Michigan, headquartered in Howell.

Most of Livingston County is served by the Livingston Educational Service Agency, which coordinates the efforts of local boards of education, but has no operating authority over schools. Local school boards in Michigan retain great autonomy over day-to-day operations.

== History ==
The district was formed in 1962 when the Michigan Legislature created intermediate school districts in each county in the state. The district was originally known as the Livingston Intermediate School District, and was renamed in 1990 to better reflect the services provided by the agency.

== Composition ==
The Livingston Educational Service Agency supports many public school districts, private schools, charter schools, colleges, and facilities. Livingston Educational Service Agency administrates all Special Education programs in the county. Livingston Educational Service Agency administrates School Bus Transportation in Livingston County (excepting in the Fowlerville School District) via the Regional Transportation Collaborative (RTC).

== Governance ==
The Livingston Educational Service Agency is governed by a publicly elected board of education, who is responsible for hiring a superintendent to serve as the chief administrative officer of the agency.

=== Public school districts ===
As of the 2017–2018 school year, these are the school districts in Livingston County, Michigan. Livingston Education Service Agency supports these school districts.:

- Brighton Area Schools
- Fowlerville Community Schools
- Hartland Consolidated Schools
- Howell Public Schools
- Pinckney Community Schools

=== Private schools ===
The Livingston Educational Service Agency includes several private schools, such as Shepherd of the Lakes Lutheran School.

=== Charter schools ===
The Livingston Educational Service Agency includes charter schools, such as the Kensington Woods High School.

=== Colleges ===
The Livingston Educational Service Agency includes these colleges:

- Cleary University (Howell Campus)
- Eastern Michigan University
- Ferris State University
- Lansing Community College
- Madonna University
- Mott Community College
- Washtenaw Community College

=== Agencies and facilities ===
The Livingston Educational Service Agency includes agencies and facilities such as the Pathway School which supports Special Education.

== See also ==
- List of intermediate school districts in Michigan
