= Allegan Area Educational Service Agency =

Address
- 310 Thomas Street, Allegan Allegan County, Michigan; United States
- Coordinates: 42.51812°N 85.86002°W

District information
- Type: Public intermediate school district
- President: Larry E. Collier
- Vice-president: Steve Tibbitts
- Superintendent: Mark R. Dobias
- Schools: 3
- Budget: US$22,896,000 (2011-12)
- NCES District ID: 2680100

Students and staff
- Students: 318 (2013-14)
- Teachers: 51.49 (2013-14)
- Staff: 199.64 (2013-14)
- Student–teacher ratio: 6.18 (2013-14)

Other information
- Website: www.alleganaesa.org

The Allegan Area Educational Service Agency (AAESA) is an intermediate school district in Michigan, headquartered in Allegan.

Most of Allegan County is served by the Allegan Area Educational Service Agency, which coordinates the efforts of local boards of education, but has no operating authority over schools. Local school boards in Michigan retain great autonomy over day-to-day operations.

== Composition ==
The Allegan Area Educational Service Agency includes many public school districts, private schools, charter schools, and facilities.

== Governance ==
The Allegan Area Educational Service Agency is governed by a publicly elected board of education, who is responsible for hiring a superintendent to serve as the chief administrative officer of the agency.

=== Public school districts ===
As of the 2014–2015 school year, the communities of Allegan County are served by the following members of the Allegan Area Educational Service Agency:

- Allegan Public Schools
- Fennville Public Schools
- Glenn Public School
- Hopkins Public Schools
- Martin Public Schools
- Otsego Public Schools
- Plainwell Community Schools
- Wayland Union Schools

=== Private schools ===
The Allegan Area Educational Service Agency includes several private schools, such as East Martin Christian High School and Heritage Christian Academy.

=== Charter schools ===
The Allegan Area Educational Service Agency includes charter schools, such as Outlook Academy.

=== Agencies and facilities ===
The Allegan Area Educational Service Agency includes agencies and facilities such as Allegan County Area Technical & Education Center and the Hillside Learning & Behavior Centers.

== See also ==
- List of intermediate school districts in Michigan
