= AALC =

AALC may refer to:

- American Association of Lutheran Churches, a Lutheran denomination
- Asociación Atlética Luján de Cuyo, a football club from Luján de Cuyo in Mendoza, Argentina
- AALC, ATM Adaptation Layer Connection
- Ann Arbor Learning Community, a public charter school in Ann Arbor, Michigan
- Australian Army Legal Corps
