= Bay–Arenac Intermediate School District =

Intermediate school district in Michigan, United States

Location
- Bay County, Michigan US-MI United States
- Coordinates: 43.61743°N 83.93188°W

District information
- Type: Public intermediate school district
- President: William A. Jordan
- Vice-president: David A. Lovely
- Superintendent: Deborah Kadish
- Schools: 4
- Budget: US$32,329,000 (2010-11)
- NCES District ID: 2680504

Students and staff
- Students: 614 (2012-13)
- Teachers: 80.72 (2012-13)
- Staff: 205.93 (2012-13)
- Student–teacher ratio: 7.61 (2012-13)

Other information
- Website: www.baisd.net

The Bay–Arenac Intermediate School District (also known as Bay–Arenac ISD) is an intermediate school district in Michigan, headquartered in Bay City.

Most of Bay County and Arenac County is served by the Bay–Arenac Intermediate School District, which coordinates the efforts of local boards of education, but has no operating authority over schools. Local school boards in Michigan retain great autonomy over day-to-day operations.

== History ==
In 2017, Arenac-Eastern School began sending students to Standish-Sterling due to declining enrollment. On March 10, 2020, the vote passed by the three districts for Arenac-Eastern to be dissolved effective in June 2020 and split between Standish-Sterling Community Schools and Au Gres-Sims School District along M-65.

== Composition ==
The Bay–Arenac Intermediate School District includes many public school districts, private schools, charter schools, colleges, and facilities.

== Governance ==
The Bay–Arenac Intermediate School District is governed by a publicly elected board of education, who is responsible for hiring a superintendent to serve as the chief administrative officer of the agency.

=== Public school districts ===
As of the 2014–2015 school year, the communities of Bay and Arenac Counties are served by the following members of the Bay–Arenac Intermediate School District:

- Arenac-Eastern School District
- Au Gres-Sims School District
- Bangor Township Schools
- Bay City Public Schools
- Essexville-Hampton Public Schools
- Pinconning Area Schools
- Standish-Sterling Community Schools

=== Private schools ===
The Bay–Arenac Intermediate School District includes several private schools, such as All Saints Central High School.

=== Charter schools ===
The Bay–Arenac Intermediate School District includes charter schools, such as the Bay-Arenac Community High School.

=== Agencies and facilities ===
The Bay–Arenac Intermediate School District includes agencies and facilities such as the Bay-Arenac ISD Career Center.

== See also ==
- List of intermediate school districts in Michigan
