= Haslett Public Schools =

School District

Address
- 5593 Franklin St Haslett, Ingham, Michigan, 48840; United States

District information
- Type: Public school district
- Motto: "A+ Tradition of Excellence"
- Grades: Pre-K–12
- Established: 1900
- Superintendent: Patrick Malley (2024–present)
- Schools: 5
- Budget: $44,813,000
- NCES District ID: 2617940
- Affiliations: Capital Area Activities Conference (CAAC); Ingham Intermediate School District

Students and staff
- Enrollment: 2,559 (2023–24)
- Student–teacher ratio: 15:1

Other information
- Website: haslettschools.org

Haslett Public Schools is a public school district serving Haslett, Michigan, a census-designated place in Ingham County in the U.S. state of Michigan. Spanning approximately 30 square miles, the district is centered in Meridian Charter Township and also encompasses portions of Bath, Woodhull, and Williamston townships, crossing three county boundaries: Ingham, Clinton, and Shiawassee. Haslett Public Schools is a member of the Ingham Intermediate School District (Ingham ISD), one of 12 local districts served by that regional educational agency.

As of the 2023–24 school year, the district enrolled approximately 2,559 students across five schools serving grades Pre-Kindergarten through 12. The district ranked #40 out of 845 school districts in Michigan based on combined math and reading proficiency for the 2022–23 school year, placing it in the top 5% statewide.

Haslett High School, the district's sole secondary institution, competes in athletics under the nickname the Vikings, with school colors of blue and gold. Alumni include American author and poet Jim Harrison (class of 1956), known for works such as Legends of the Fall, and Lori Garver (class of 1979), who served as Deputy Administrator of NASA from 2009 to 2013.

== History ==
=== Origins and early education (pre-1900) ===
Formal schooling in the Haslett area preceded the district's organization by several decades. The land now comprising the Haslett school district lies in Meridian Township, which was first settled by European-American pioneers in 1836, when Obed Marshall purchased 180 acres near present-day Haslett and the earliest settlers made use of pine stands at Pine Lake (now Lake Lansing) to build their cabins. Prior to European settlement, the area was used seasonally for hunting and fishing by Native American peoples, primarily the Chippewa and Ottawa, whose leaders—including Chief John Okemos—participated in the Treaty of Saginaw in 1819.

As Meridian Township grew through the mid-nineteenth century, small single-room schoolhouses served scattered farming communities. One such institution, the Pine Lake School, educated the earliest generations of students in the Haslett area before being succeeded by more centralized facilities. The development of plank roads and railroads through the region played a major role in the area's growth, making Haslett a logical gathering point for farmers shipping harvests to markets and creating demand for organized schooling infrastructure.

The community takes its name from James and Sarah Haslett, a couple who established a Spiritualist camp on the shore of Pine Lake in the late 1880s that drew thousands of visitors to summer meetings and lectures. Sarah Haslett's philanthropic contribution to local education would prove lasting: in 1898, she donated a parcel of land for a new school site, directly enabling the district's formal establishment.

=== Formalization and growth (1900–1950) ===
In September 1900, construction was completed on a two-room brick schoolhouse on present-day School Street, near the current location of Vera Ralya Elementary School. Originally named "Haslett School," the building served students through ten grades and represented the community's first centralized educational institution, replacing the earlier one-room schoolhouses. The school's first graduating class, consisting of six students, completed their studies in 1906.

By 1910, a second story was added to the original building, providing four additional classrooms. In 1921, further additions were constructed and the institution was renamed Haslett Agricultural School, reflecting the district's rural character and the community's dependence on farming.

In 1924, the broader Haslett–Lake Lansing area experienced a cultural and tourism boom with the construction of the Dells ballroom, described as among the most popular in Michigan. Population growth through the 1920s and 1930s continued to increase the school-age population, and continuous building additions were made through the following decades.

=== Postwar expansion (1950–1980) ===
The postwar suburban migration that reshaped much of American public education transformed Haslett significantly. In 1957, the district constructed Wilkshire School, now Wilkshire Early Childhood Center. That same year and the following year, land was purchased south of Franklin Street for a new high school building. By 1958, Haslett High School opened at its current site with an original capacity of approximately 400 students.

The new high school anchored a reorganized district structure that by the mid-1970s included the early childhood center, two elementary schools, a middle school, and the high school—a configuration consistent with the district's present-day organization.

=== Modern era (1980–present) ===
The district's proximity to Michigan State University in neighboring East Lansing has facilitated ongoing academic partnerships. Meridian Charter Township, within which the district is primarily located, has been described as having two of the best school districts in the state alongside Okemos Public Schools.

== Schools ==
The district operates five schools serving Pre-Kindergarten through grade 12, all located within Meridian Charter Township, Ingham County. The two elementary schools serving grades 2–5—Vera Ralya and Murphy—assign students to one building or the other based on residential address.

| School | Grades | Address | Enrollment (2023–24) | NCES ID |
|---|---|---|---|---|
| Haslett High School | 9–12 | 5450 Marsh Rd, Haslett, MI 48840 | 774 | 261794005467 |
| Haslett Middle School | 6–8 | Franklin St, Haslett, MI 48840 | 660 | 261794005464 |
| Murphy Elementary School | 2–5 | 1875 Lake Lansing Rd, Haslett, MI 48840 | 386 | 261794005463 |
| Vera Ralya Elementary School | 2–5 | 5645 School St, Haslett, MI 48840 | 391 | 261794005465 |
| Wilkshire School (Early Childhood Center) | PK–1 | 5750 Academic Way, Haslett, MI 48840 | 390 | 261794005466 |

=== Haslett High School ===
Haslett High School, located at 5450 Marsh Road in Meridian Charter Township, is the district's sole secondary institution for grades 9–12. It enrolled 779 students in the 2023–24 school year with a student-to-teacher ratio of approximately 19.6:1 and a teaching staff of 39.70 full-time equivalent teachers. The school's principal is Brandy Butcher and the student newspaper is the Viking Longboat.

Haslett High School is ranked #75 within Michigan and #2,415 nationally by U.S. News & World Report, based on state-required test performance, graduation rates, and college-readiness indicators.

=== Haslett Middle School ===
Haslett Middle School, located on Franklin Street, serves grades 6–8. Haslett Middle School is ranked #43 among Michigan middle schools by U.S. News & World Report.

=== Elementary schools and early childhood ===
Murphy Elementary School and Vera Ralya Elementary School both serve grades 2–5, with student assignment determined by home address. Murphy Elementary recorded math proficiency of 68% and reading proficiency of 67% in recent state assessments, above district averages. Vera Ralya recorded math proficiency of 54% and reading proficiency of 58%.

Wilkshire School enrolls students from pre-kindergarten through first grade and functions as the district's early childhood center. It was originally constructed in 1957 as "Wilkshire School" before being repurposed as an early childhood center.

== Academics and performance ==
Haslett Public Schools consistently outperforms state averages on standardized assessments administered under Michigan's accountability system, which uses the Michigan Student Test of Educational Progress (M-STEP) for grades 3–8 and the Michigan Merit Examination (MME) for grade 11.

For the 2022–23 school year, district students recorded a math proficiency rate of 59%, compared to a Michigan-wide average of 35%, and a reading proficiency rate of 66%, compared to the state average of 46%. The Michigan Department of Education reported that in spring 2023, scores increased in 15 of 20 statewide assessments compared to 2022, part of a gradual statewide recovery following disruptions from the COVID-19 pandemic. These results placed Haslett Public Schools at #40 among 845 Michigan school districts—within the top 5% statewide—with the district additionally ranking in Michigan's top 5% for graduation rate and top 10% for science proficiency. SchoolDigger ranks the district 32nd out of 610 Michigan districts using its own composite methodology drawn from state and federal data.

The district's curriculum is aligned to benchmarks established by the Michigan Department of Education and conforms to the Common Core State Standards and Career and College Readiness Standards in core academic areas. Annual education progress is published in the district's Annual Education Report, available through the district website and in each school's principal office.

Per-pupil expenditure stands at $13,639 annually, with a total annual revenue of approximately $44.8 million. Approximately 21% of students are eligible for the federal free and reduced price meal program. The district's total staff count is 366.31 full-time equivalent employees per NCES data for the 2024–25 school year.

| Metric | Haslett Public Schools | Michigan State Average | Source |
|---|---|---|---|
| Math Proficiency (2022–23) | 59% | 35% | Public School Review |
| Reading Proficiency (2022–23) | 66% | 46% | Public School Review |
| State District Rank | #40 of 845 | — | Public School Review |
| Graduation Rate (state percentile) | Top 5% | — | Public School Review |
| Student–Teacher Ratio | 15:1 | 17:1 | NeighborhoodScout |
| Per-Pupil Expenditure | $13,639 | — | U.S. News & World Report |
| AP Participation (Haslett HS) | 42% | — | U.S. News & World Report |
| SchoolDigger District Rank | #32 of 610 | — | SchoolDigger |
| Middle School Rank (Michigan) | #43 | — | U.S. News & World Report |

== Student demographics ==
As of the most recent data, the student body of Haslett Public Schools is predominantly white, with a minority enrollment of approximately 30%—below the Michigan state average of 37%. The district's racial and ethnic composition, reported by U.S. News & World Report from government data, is as follows:

| Race / Ethnicity | Percentage |
|---|---|
| White | 70.3% |
| Hispanic or Latino | 11.2% |
| Two or more races | 9.2% |
| Asian or Pacific Islander | 5.0% |
| Black or African American | 4.0% |
| American Indian or Alaska Native | 0.4% |

By gender, 53% of students are male and 47% are female. Approximately 26% of students are economically disadvantaged as measured by eligibility for the free and reduced price lunch program, per National Center for Education Statistics data. GreatSchools rates a majority of schools in the district above the state average in school quality.

== Athletics ==
Haslett High School competes under the athletic nickname the Vikings, the school colors of blue and gold, and the mascot Victor the Viking. Haslett's athletic programs compete in the Capital Area Activities Conference (CAAC), a high school sports league based in the Lansing area whose member schools come from Clinton, Eaton, Ingham, Ionia, and Livingston counties; Haslett competes in the CAAC's Red Division. The CAAC is itself a member of the Michigan High School Athletic Association (MHSAA).

The district's choral program has received recognition at the state level, with Niche reviewers noting it as a particular strength of the district.

== Notable alumni ==
- Jim Harrison (December 11, 1937 – March 26, 2016) was an American poet, novelist, and essayist widely regarded as one of the most significant literary voices to emerge from Michigan.
- Lori Garver (born May 22, 1961, in Lansing, Michigan) a former Deputy Administrator of NASA, having served as NASA's second-in-command from July 17, 2009, to September 6, 2013, under President Barack Obama.

== Administration and governance ==
Haslett Public Schools Administration Building
- Interactive map of the Haslett Public Schools Administration Building area

General information
- Location: 5593 Franklin Street, Haslett, Michigan 48840
- Coordinates: 42.7444°N 84.4059°W
- Owner: Haslett Public Schools

Website
- haslettschools.org

The Haslett Public Schools Administration Building is located at 5593 Franklin Street in Haslett, Michigan, and serves as the central hub for district-wide operations. The Superintendent's Office and the Business Office—which oversees district finances, payroll, and operations—are both housed within the building, with the Business Office situated on the second floor. The building's Board Room serves as the regular venue for Board of Education meetings, which are held twice monthly at 7:00 p.m. and open to public comment, with each speaker allotted up to five minutes. The building's main phone number is (517) 339-7000, and general office hours are 8:00 a.m. to 4:30 p.m. on weekdays.

Haslett Public Schools is governed by a seven-member Board of Education, with members serving six-year terms. The current Superintendent is Patrick Malley, appointed in 2024. Board meeting schedules, agendas, and minutes are published on the district's official website, and board meetings are recorded and made available via the district's YouTube channel.

As a Michigan public school district, Haslett Public Schools is subject to oversight by the Michigan Department of Education and receives intermediate support services through the Ingham Intermediate School District (Ingham ISD), a regional educational service agency in operation since 1962 that serves twelve local districts and more than 44,000 students. The district's finances and academic data are reported annually to the National Center for Education Statistics (NCES), with the district assigned NCES District ID 2617940.

District boundaries span approximately 30 square miles (78 km^{2}), primarily within Meridian Charter Township (Ingham County), with portions extending into Bath Township (Clinton County) and Woodhull and Williamston townships (Shiawassee County). Neighboring school districts include Okemos Public Schools, East Lansing School District, Williamston Community Schools, and Bath Community Schools.
