= Midland County Educational Service Agency =

Location
- Midland County, Michigan US-MI United States
- Coordinates: 43.63296°N 84.22762°W

District information
- Type: Public intermediate school district
- Established: 1962
- President: Kevin A. Heye
- Vice-president: Sara Grivetti
- Superintendent: John Searles
- Schools: 1
- Budget: US$15,170,000 (2010-11)
- NCES District ID: 2680800

Students and staff
- Teachers: 30.00 (2012-13)
- Staff: 219.78 (2012-13)

Other information
- Website: www.midlandesa.org

The Midland County Educational Service Agency (MCESA) is an intermediate school district in Michigan, headquartered in Midland.

Most of Midland County is served by the Midland County Educational Service Agency, which coordinates the efforts of local boards of education, but has no operating authority over schools. Local school boards in Michigan retain great autonomy over day-to-day operations.

== History ==
The district was formed in 1962 when the Michigan Legislature created intermediate school districts in each county in the state.

== Composition ==
The Midland County Educational Service Agency includes many public school districts, private schools, charter schools, colleges, and facilities.

== Governance ==
The Midland County Educational Service Agency is governed by a publicly elected board of education, which is responsible for hiring a superintendent to serve as the chief administrative officer of the agency.

=== Public school districts ===
As of the 2014–2015 school year, the communities of Midland County are served by the following members of the Midland County Educational Service Agency:

- Bullock Creek Public Schools
- Coleman Community Schools
- Meridian Public Schools
- Midland Public Schools

=== Private schools ===
The Midland County Educational Service Agency includes private parochial schools.

=== Charter schools ===
The Midland County Educational Service Agency includes charter schools, such as the Academic and Career Education Academy, the Midland Academy of Advanced and Creative Studies, and Windover High School.

== See also ==
- List of intermediate school districts in Michigan
