= Jake Lampman =

American football player (born 1993)

No. 19, 89,
- Position: Wide receiver

Personal information
- Born: June 11, 1993 (age 33); East Lansing, Michigan, U.S.
- Listed height: 6 ft 0 in (1.83 m)
- Listed weight: 205 lb (93 kg)

Career information
- High school: Haslett (Haslett, Michigan)
- College: Ferris State
- NFL draft: 2016: undrafted

Career history
- New Orleans Saints (2016); Tampa Bay Buccaneers (2017–2018)*; Team 9 (2020)*; Tampa Bay Vipers (2020); New Orleans Saints (2020–2021)*; BC Lions (2023)*
- * Offseason or practice squad member only
- Stats at Pro Football Reference

Jake Lampman (born June 11, 1993) is an American football wide receiver. He played college football at Ferris State. He was signed by the New Orleans Saints as an undrafted free agent after the 2016 NFL draft.

== Early life ==
Lampman attended Haslett High School where he earned three letters in football. He was a two-year starter, where as a junior, he earned All-conference honorable mention in 2009. He was also an All-Capital Area Gold Conference selection. Aside from football, he also competed in both track & field and basketball.

== College career ==
Lampman then attended Ferris State University.

As a freshman in 2011, he appeared in 11 games. He recorded six receptions for 114 yards and one touchdown. As a sophomore in 2012, he appeared in 11 games with 10 starts. He recorded 43 receptions for 717 yards and seven touchdowns. He also rushed the ball 10 times for 66 yards. He ranked third on the team in total scoring (42). He also finished third in all-purpose yards with 802 (72 yards-per-game). In 2013, as a junior, he appeared in 11 games as a starter. He recorded 38 receptions for 542 yards and five touchdowns. He also rushed the ball 18 times for 132 yards and four touchdowns. He also recorded 14 tackles on special teams. He was named All-Great Lakes Intercollegiate Athletic Conference (GLIAC). In 2014 as a senior, he appeared in three games. He recorded 14 receptions for 216 yards and five touchdowns. After his injury in the third game of the season, he received a medical redshirt. He was named a member of the 2014 GLIAC Championship and NCAA Playoff teams. In 2015 as a redshirt senior, he appeared in 12 games. He recorded 52 receptions for 731 yards and eight touchdowns.

== Professional career ==
=== New Orleans Saints ===
After going undrafted in the 2016 NFL draft, Lampman had an unsuccessful try out with the Baltimore Ravens. However, a week later, he joined the New Orleans Saints for a rookie mini-camp, after which he was signed to the Saints' 90–man roster. In his rookie debut against the Carolina Panthers he recorded 3 solo tackles on special teams and was awarded a Game ball following the contest. He stayed active for 12 games and played in 6 games recording 6 special teams tackles. On September 6, he was signed to the Saints' practice squad. On October 15, he was promoted from the practice squad to the active roster. On September 2, 2017, he was waived by the Saints.

=== Tampa Bay Buccaneers ===
On November 22, 2017, Lampman was signed to the Tampa Bay Buccaneers' practice squad. On December 23, 2017, he was released by the Buccaneers, but was re-signed four days later. He signed a reserve/future contract with the Buccaneers on January 3, 2018.

On August 25, 2018, Lampman was waived/injured by the Buccaneers and was placed on injured reserve. He was released on September 3, 2018.

=== Tampa Bay Vipers ===
Lampman signed with the XFL's Team 9 practice squad during the regular season. He was signed off of Team 9 by the Tampa Bay Vipers on March 9, 2020. He had his contract terminated when the league suspended operations on April 10, 2020.

=== New Orleans Saints (second stint) ===
Lampman had a tryout with the New Orleans Saints on August 17, 2020. On December 23, 2020, Lampman signed with the Saints' practice squad. On January 13, 2021, Lampman was released. On January 18, 2021, Lampman signed a reserve/futures contract with the Saints. On August 18, 2021, Lampman was waived by the New Orleans Saints.

=== BC Lions ===
On January 26, 2023, Lampman signed with the BC Lions of the Canadian Football League (CFL). On May 24, 2023, Lampman was released by the Lions.
