= List of school districts in Michigan =

There are three distinct types of school districts in the U.S. state of Michigan.

- For local education agency (LEA), or public school districts, see List of local education agency districts in Michigan
- For intermediate school districts (ISDs), see list of intermediate school districts in Michigan
- For public school academy (PSA) districts, which include charter schools, see list of public school academy districts in Michigan

LEA school districts are generally independent governmental agencies as per the U.S. Census Bureau.

== See also ==
- List of high schools in Michigan
- List of schools in the Roman Catholic Archdiocese of Detroit
