= Lake City High School (Michigan) =

Location
- 251 E. Russell Street; Lake City, Michigan 49651; United States
- Coordinates: 44°20′15″N 85°12′42″W

Information
- Type: Public high school
- School district: Lake City Area Schools
- Superintendent: Tim Hejnal
- Principal: Jessica Vanderbrook
- Teaching staff: 23.94 (on an FTE basis)
- Grades: 9–12
- Enrollment: 384 (2023-2024)
- Student to teacher ratio: 16.04
- Colors: Red and black
- Nickname: Trojans
- Rival: McBain High School
- Feeder schools: Lake City Middle School; Lake City Elementary School
- Website: www.lakecitytrojans.org/o/lchs

Lake City High School (LCHS) is a public high school in Lake City, Michigan, United States. It serves grades 9–12 for the Lake City Area Schools.

== Demographics ==
The demographic breakdown of the 370 students enrolled in 2018-19 was:

- Male - 48.6%
- Female - 51.4%
- Native American - 0.5%
- Asian - 0.5%
- Black - 0.5%
- Hispanic - 4.9%
- White - 90.0%
- Multiracial - 3.5%

== See also ==
- List of high schools in Michigan
- List of local education agency districts in Michigan
