= Haslett High School =

Public high school in Michigan, United States

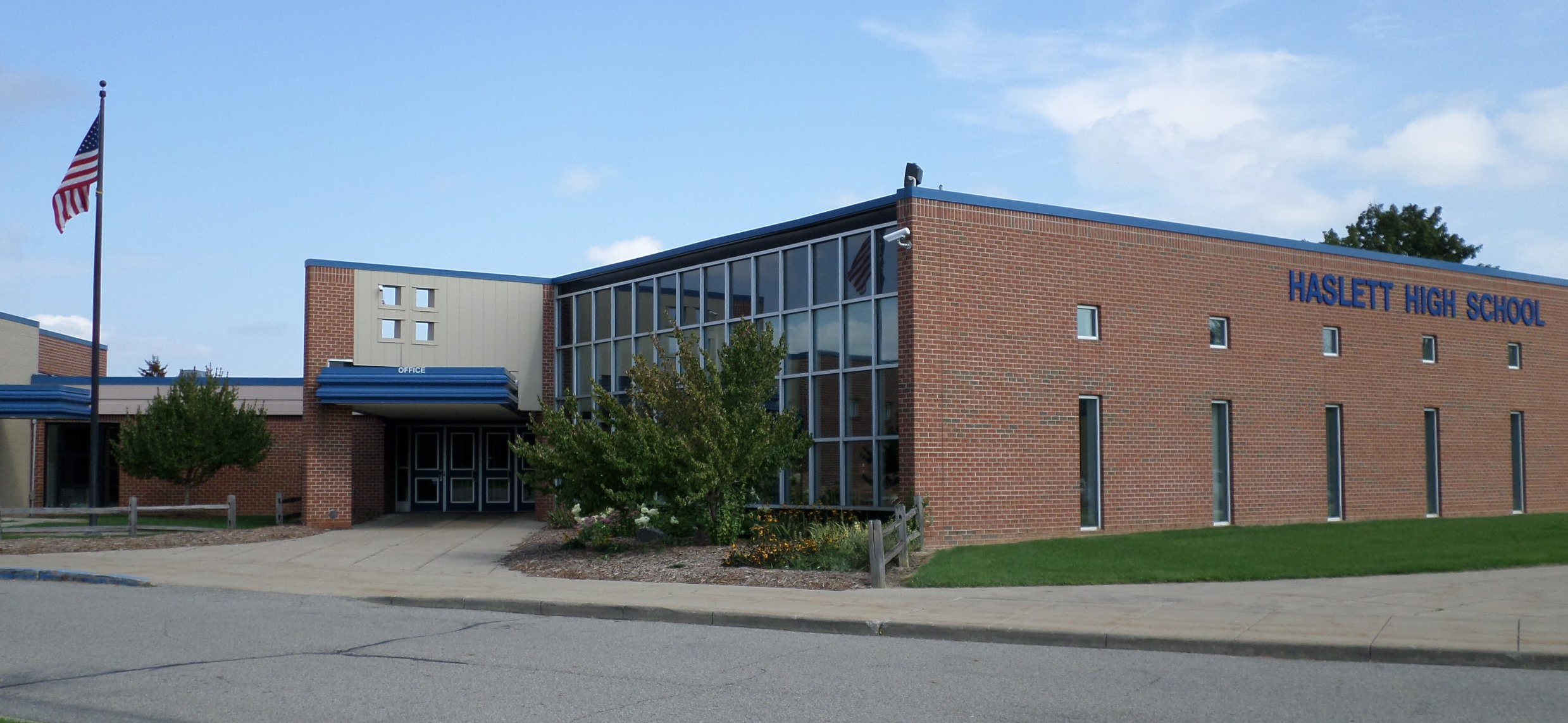

Location
- 5450 Marsh Road; Meridian Township; Haslett, Ingham, Michigan 48840; United States
- 42°44′22″N 84°24′24″W

Information
- School type: Public
- School district: Haslett Public Schools
- Superintendent: Patrick Malley
- NCES School ID: 261794005467
- Principal: Brandy Butcher
- Teaching staff: 39.70 (FTE)
- Grades: 9-12
- Enrollment: 779 (2023-2024)
- Student to teacher ratio: 19.62
- Hours in school day: 6
- Colours: Blue & Gold
- Mascot: Victor the Viking
- Nickname: Vikings
- Newspaper: Viking Longboat
- Alumni: Jim Harrison; Lori Garver
- Website: haslett.k12.mi.us

Student assessments
- 2021–22 school year Change vs. prior year

M-STEP 11th grade proficiency rates (Science / Social Studies)
- Advanced %: 32.3 / 20.7
- Proficient %: 30.3 / 31.3
- PR. Proficient %: 15.7 / 39.9
- Not Proficient %: 21.7 / 8.1

Average test scores
- SAT Total: 1030.7 (▼ −88.3)

Haslett High School is a public high school located in Haslett, Michigan. It is the only high school in the Haslett Public Schools district. It is located a few miles northeast of Michigan State University on Marsh Road between Haslett Road and Grand River Avenue.

== History ==
In September 1900, a two-room brick building was constructed on present-day School Street near the current location of Vera Ralya Elementary School. "Haslett School" was taught in this building until 1910 when a second story addition was constructed adding more classrooms. In 1921, more additions were made and the school was named "Haslett Agricultural School." Continuous additions occurred until 1957 when "Wilkshire School," now the "Wilkshire Early Childhood Center," was built. Later that year—and the following year—land was bought for the building of a new high school south of Franklin Street. By 1958, Haslett High School was built with room for 400 students.

== Notable alumni ==
- Lori Garver
- Jim Harrison
- Jake Lampman
