= Local government in New Mexico =

Local government in New Mexico consists of counties and municipalities.

== Municipalities ==
A municipality may call itself a: village, town, or city. There is no distinction in the statutes and no correlation to any particular form (Mayor-Council, Commission-Manager, etc.). Unless provided otherwise in a municipality's charter, municipal elections are held on the first Tuesday in March of every even-numbered year. Elections are non-partisan, and election materials (cards, signs, ads, etc.) are exempted from the requirements for all other elections that the responsible party be identified (as in "paid for by Committee to Elect Joe Candidate").

Municipalities are governed under Dillon's rule, unless they elect to be governed by home rule. Currently, there are 10 home rule municipalities in New Mexico (Alamogordo, Albuquerque, Clovis, Gallup, Grants, Hobbs, Las Cruces, Los Alamos, Rio Rancho, and Santa Fe), as well as two chartered cities (Las Vegas and Silver City).

== Other bodies ==
In addition to municipalities, limited local authority can be vested in landowners' associations and districts. An example of the former is the Madrid Landowners' Association, which is the closest thing to local government in Madrid, New Mexico. Its authority comes from the restrictive covenants that are written into all deeds.

== See also ==
- Local government in the United States
- New Mexico Supreme Court Building
