= Hopkins Public Schools =

Hopkins Public Schools can refer to:

- Hopkins Public Schools (Michigan)
- Hopkins Public Schools (Minnesota)
