= Ingham Academy High School (Michigan) =

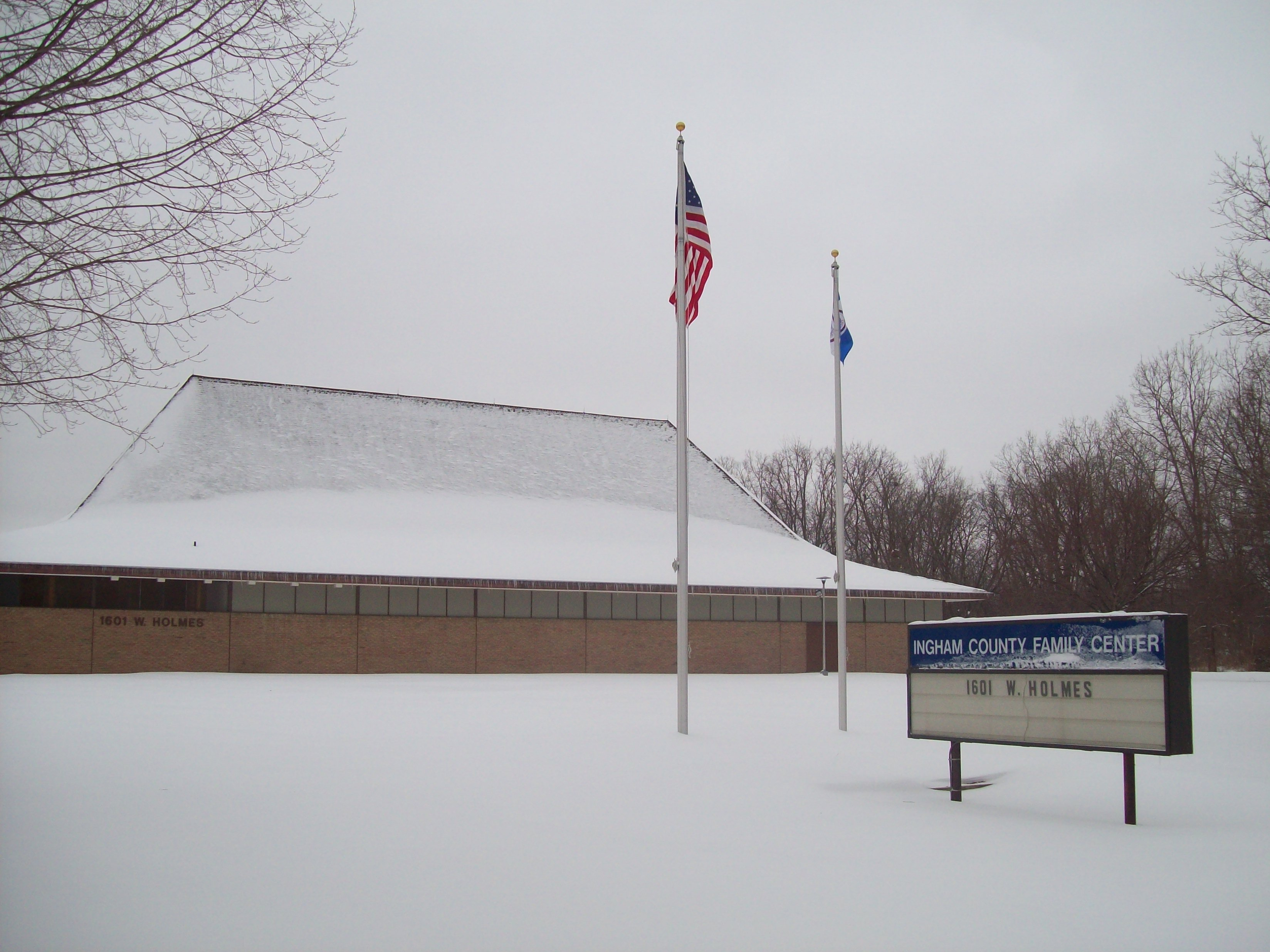

Location
- 1601 W Holmes Rd; Lansing, Michigan; United States; 42°41′49″N 84°34′25″W

Information
- Type: Alternative School
- Established: 2007
- School district: Ingham Intermediate School District
- Principal: Denise Lycos
- Grades: 8 to 12
- Enrollment: 40 (2024-25)
- Colors: Black and Blue
- Mascot: Panthers
- Team name: Panthers
- Website: Ingham Academy High School Website

Ingham Academy High School is an alternative high school located in Lansing, Michigan. It is run with a partnership between Ingham Intermediate School District, Highfields, and the Ingham County Circuit Court. With the partnership of these three agencies, the focus of the Ingham Academy is to educate at risk students with the Michigan school curriculum and the life-skills needed for being a productive citizen.

The Ingham Academy was founded in 2007 with 2 high school classrooms and 20 students in the Grady Porter Building in downtown Lansing. It has grown to 6 teachers and nearly 60 students, including one 8th grade classroom, at its new location at 1601 W Holmes Rd.
