= Local government in the United States =

Governmental jurisdictions below the level of the state

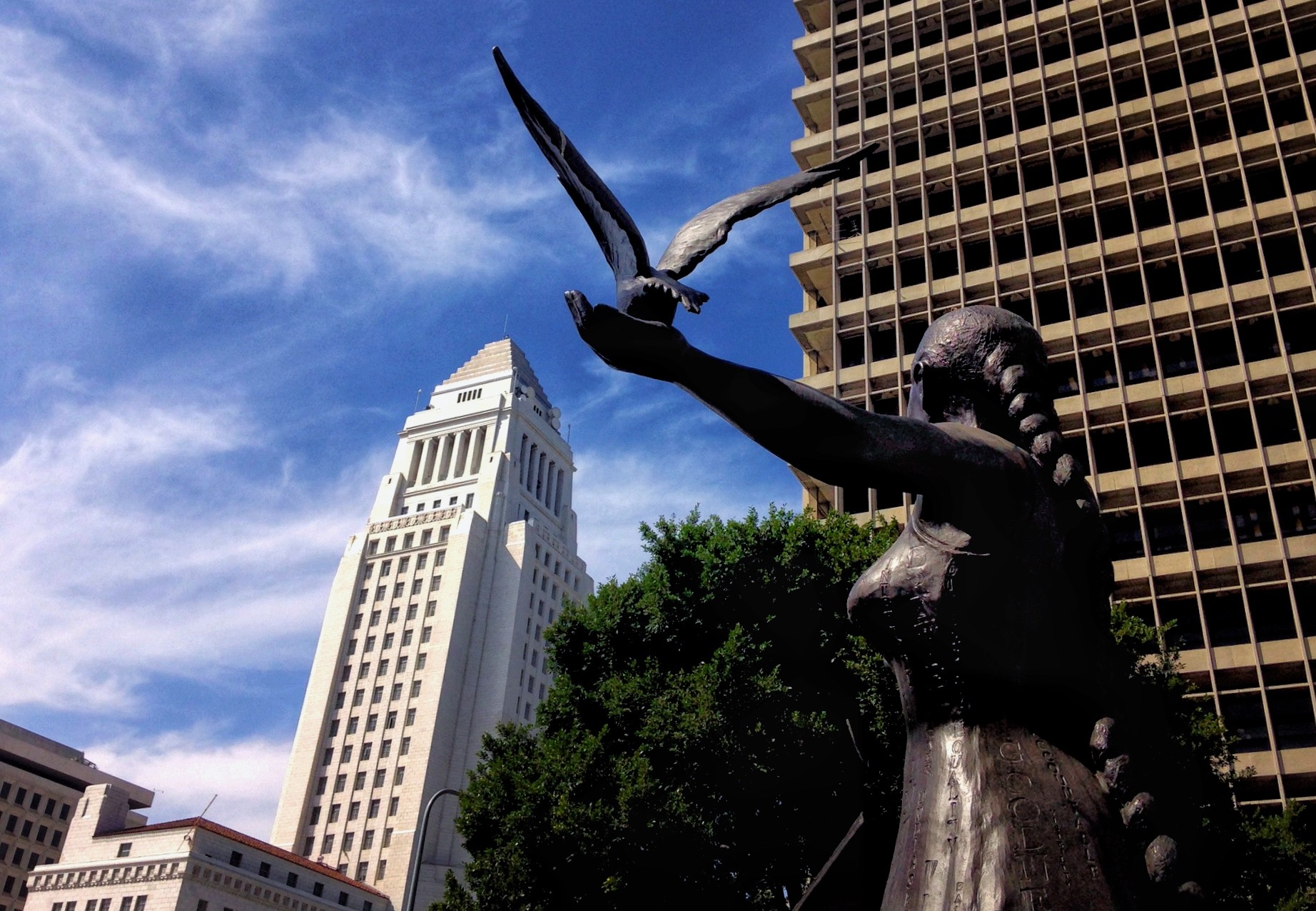
The "Embodied" statue, representing justice, in the Civic Center neighborhood of Los Angeles, California, which mostly consists of city, county, and state government offices. Visible in the background are the Los Angeles City Hall and the Clara Shortridge Foltz Criminal Justice Center.

Local government in the United States is a topic exclusively in the domain of the states (except for the non-sovereign District of Columbia) (Note: The territories are not in the United States, but belong to and are under the sovereignty of the same. Local government in the territories is therefore granted by and governed by federal law. See the page for the Insular Cases for more information.) Most states and territories have at least two tiers of local government: counties and municipalities. Louisiana uses the term parish and Alaska uses the term borough for what the U.S. Census Bureau terms county equivalents in those states. Civil townships or towns are used as subdivisions of a county in 20 states, mostly in the Northeast and Midwest. Local governments are merely creatures of the state itself, with them being state departments which have their powers and geographic jurisdiction granted by and limited by state law.

Population centers may be organized into incorporated municipalities of several types, including the city, town, borough, and village. The types and nature of these municipal entities are defined by state law, and vary from state to state. In addition to these general-purpose local governments, states may also create special-purpose local governments. Depending on the state, local governments may operate under their own charters, under the states general law, or a state may have a mix of chartered and general-law local governments. Generally, in a state having both chartered and general-law local governments, the chartered local governments have more local autonomy and home rule. Municipalities are typically subordinate to a county government, with some exceptions. Certain cities, for example, have consolidated with their county government as consolidated city-counties. In Virginia, cities are completely independent from the county in which they would otherwise be a part. In a few other states, both the county and a municipality within their jurisdiction may have home rule, in which case they may divide or harmonize or augment their functions and services. In some states, particularly in New England, towns form the primary unit of local government below the state level, in some cases eliminating the need for county government entirely. Many rural areas and even some suburban areas of many states have no municipal government below the county level.

In addition to counties and municipalities, states often create special purpose authorities, such as school districts and districts for fire protection, sanitary sewer service, public transportation, public libraries, public parks or forests, water resource management, and conservation districts. Such special purpose districts may encompass areas in multiple municipalities or counties. According to the US Census Bureau's data collected in 2012, there were 89,004 local government units in the United States. This data shows a decline from 89,476 units since the last census of local governments performed in 2007. In 2024 PoliEngine also reported that there were a total of 500,396 total elected officials in local governments in the United States, including 135,531 elected mayors and town council members, 126,958 elected township members, 58,818 elected county officers, 95,000 school board members, and 84,089 special district members. This made up a total of 96% of all elected officials in the United States.

Each of the five permanently inhabited U.S. territories is also subdivided into smaller entities. Puerto Rico has 78 municipalities, and the Northern Mariana Islands has four municipalities. Guam has 19 villages, the U.S. Virgin Islands has districts, and American Samoa has districts and unorganized atolls.

Each Indian Reservation is subdivided in various ways. For example, the Navajo Nation is subdivided into agencies and Chapter houses, while the Blackfeet Nation is subdivided into Communities.

== History ==
When North America was colonized by Europeans from the 17th century onward, there was initially little control from governments back in Europe. Many settlements began as shareholder or stockholder business enterprises, and while the king of Britain had technical sovereignty, in most instances "full governmental authority was vested in the company itself." Settlers had to fend for themselves; compact towns sprung up based as legal corporations in what has been described as "pure democracy":

The people, owing to the necessity of guarding against the Indians and wild animals, and to their desire to attend the same church, settled in small, compact communities, or townships, which they called towns. The town was a legal corporation, was the political unit, and was represented in the General Court. It was a democracy of the purest type. Several times a year the adult males met in town meeting to discuss public questions, to lay taxes, to make local laws, and to elect officers. The chief officers were the "selectmen," from three to nine in number, who should have the general management of the public business; the town clerk, treasurer, constables, assessors, and overseers of the poor. To this day the town government continues in a large measure in some parts of New England.––historian Henry William Elson writing in 1904.

Propertied men voted; in no colonies was there universal suffrage. The founding of the Massachusetts Bay Colony in 1629 by a group of Puritans led by John Winthrop came with the understanding that the enterprise was to be "based in the new world rather than in London." The notion of self-government became accepted in the colonies, although it was not totally free from challenges; in the 1670s, the Lords of Trade and Plantations (a royal committee regulating mercantile trade in the colonies) tried to annul the Massachusetts Bay charter, but by 1691, the New England colonies had reinstalled their previous governments.

Voting was established as a precedent early on; in fact, one of the first things that Jamestown settlers did was conduct an election. Typically, voters were white males described as "property owners" aged twenty-one and older, but sometimes the restrictions were greater, and in practice, persons able to participate in elections were few. Women were prevented from voting (although there were a few exceptions) and African Americans were excluded. The colonists never thought of themselves as subservient but rather as having a loose association with authorities in London. Representative government sprung up spontaneously in various colonies, and during the colonial years, it was recognized and ratified by later charters. But the colonial assemblies passed few bills and did not conduct much business, but dealt with a narrow range of issues, and legislative sessions lasted weeks (occasionally longer), and most legislators could not afford to neglect work for extended periods; so wealthier people tended to predominate in local legislatures. Office holders tended to serve from a sense of duty and prestige, and not for financial benefit.

Campaigning by candidates was different from today's. There were no mass media or advertising. Candidates talked with voters in person, walking a line between undue familiarity and aloofness. Prospective officeholders were expected to be at the polls on election day and made a point to greet all voters. Failure to appear or to be civil to all could be disastrous. In some areas, candidates offered voters food and drink, evenhandedly giving "treats" to opponents as well as supporters.––Ed Crews.

Rules and orders for the regulation of the corporation when met in Common Council, Philadelphia, c. 1800–1809

Taxes were generally based on real estate since it was fixed in place and plainly visible, its value was generally well known, and revenue could be allocated to the government unit where the property was located.

After the American Revolution, the electorate chose the governing councils in almost every American municipality, and state governments began issuing municipal charters. During the 19th century, many municipalities were granted charters by the state governments and became technically municipal corporations. Townships and county governments and city councils shared much of the responsibility for decision-making which varied from state to state. As the United States grew in size and complexity, decision-making authority for issues such as business regulation, taxation, environmental regulation moved to state governments and the national government, while local governments retained control over such matters as zoning issues, property taxes, and public parks. The concept of "zoning" originated in the U.S. during the 1920s, according to one source, in which state law gave certain townships or other local governing bodies authority to decide how land was used; a typical zoning ordinance has a map of a parcel of land attached with a statement specifying how that land can be used, how buildings can be laid out, and so forth. Zoning legitimacy was upheld by the Supreme Court in its Euclid v. Ambler decision.

== Types ==
The Tenth Amendment to the United States Constitution makes local government a matter of state rather than federal law, with special cases for territories and the District of Columbia. As a result, the states have adopted a wide variety of systems of local government. The United States Census Bureau conducts the Census of Governments every five years to compile statistics on government organization, public employment, and government finances. The categories of local government established in this Census of Governments is a convenient basis for understanding local government in the United States. The categories are as follows:

1. County Governments
2. Town or Township Governments
3. Municipal Governments
4. Special-Purpose Local Governments

=== County governments ===
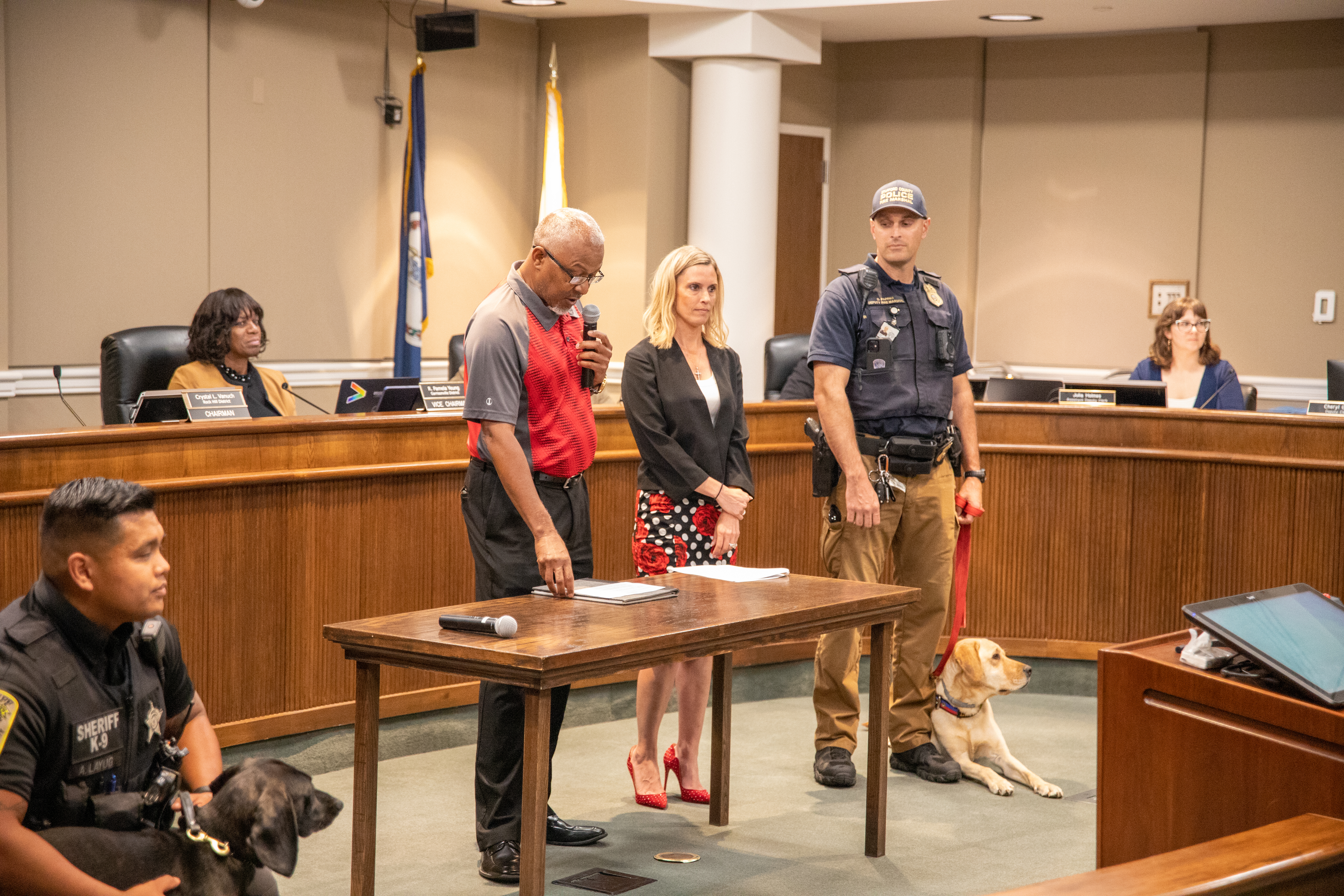
A county board meeting in Stafford County, Virginia

County governments are organized local governments authorized in state constitutions and statutes. Counties and county-equivalents form the first-tier administrative division of the states. The county equivalents in Louisiana are called parishes, while those in Alaska are called boroughs.

All the states are divided into counties or county-equivalents for administrative purposes, with most, although not all counties or county-equivalents, having an organized county government. County government has been eliminated throughout Connecticut and Rhode Island, as well as in parts of Massachusetts. The Unorganized Borough in Alaska also does not operate under a county level government.

The specific governmental powers of counties vary widely between the states. In some states, mainly in New England, they are primarily used as judicial districts. In other states, counties have broad powers in housing, education, transportation and recreation. In areas lacking a county government, services are provided either by lower level townships or municipalities, or the state.

Counties may contain a number of cities, towns, villages, or hamlets. Some cities including Philadelphia, Honolulu, San Francisco, Nashville, and Denver are consolidated city-counties, where the municipality and the county have been merged into a unified, coterminous jurisdiction—that is to say, these counties consist in their entirety of a single municipality whose city government also operates as the county government. Some counties, such as Arlington County, Virginia, do not have any additional subdivisions. Some states contain independent cities that are not part of any county; although it may still function as if it was a consolidated city-county, an independent city was legally separated from any county. Some municipalities are in multiple counties; New York City is uniquely partitioned into five boroughs that are each coterminous with a county.

=== Town or township governments ===
In many states, most or all of the land area of counties is divided into townships, which may or may not be incorporated. In New York, Wisconsin and New England, county subdivisions are called towns. The U.S. Census divides counties in states not having such subdivisions into other minor civil divisions, sometimes using electoral districts.

The terms "township" and "town" are closely related (in many historical documents the terms are used interchangeably). The powers granted to townships or towns vary considerably from state to state. Many states grant townships some governmental powers (making them civil townships, either independently or as a part of the county government). In others, survey townships are non-governmental. Towns in the six New England states and townships in New Jersey and Pennsylvania are included in this category by the Census Bureau, despite the fact that they are legally municipal corporations, since their structure has no necessary relation to concentration of population, which is typical of municipalities elsewhere in the United States. In particular, towns in New England have considerably more power than most townships elsewhere and often function as legally equivalent to cities, typically exercising the full range of powers that are divided between counties, townships, and cities in other states. In New England, towns are a principal form of local municipal government, providing many of the functions of counties in other states. In California, by contrast, the pertinent statutes of the Government Code clarify that "town" is simply another word for "city", especially a general law city as distinct from a charter city. In some states, large areas have no general-purpose local government below the county level.

Town or township governments are organized local governments authorized in the state constitutions and statutes of 20 Northeastern and Midwestern states, established to provide general government for a defined area, generally based on the geographic subdivision of a county.

An additional dimension that distinguishes township governments from municipalities is the historical circumstance surrounding their formation. For example, towns in New England are also defined by a tradition of local government presided over by town meetings — assemblies open to all voters to express their opinions on public policy.

The term "town" is also used for a local level of government in New York and Wisconsin. The terms "town" and "township" are used interchangeably in Minnesota.

Some townships or other incorporated areas like villages, boroughs, plantations, and hamlets have governments and political power; others are simply geographic designations. Townships in many states are generally the product of the Public Land Survey System.

=== Municipal governments ===
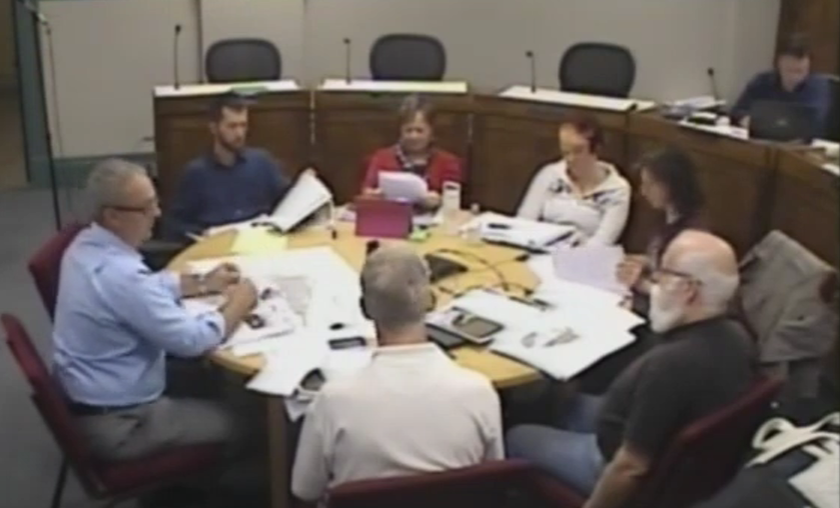
The city councillors of Montpelier, Vermont, a municipality, at a roundtable meeting

Municipal governments are organized local governments authorized in state constitutions and statutes, established to provide general government for a defined area, generally corresponding to a population center rather than one of a set of areas into which a county is divided. The category includes those governments designated as cities, boroughs (except in Alaska), towns (except in Minnesota and Wisconsin), and villages. This concept corresponds roughly to the "incorporated places" that are recognized in Census Bureau reporting of population and housing statistics, although the Census Bureau excludes New England towns from their statistics for this category, and the count of municipal governments excludes places that are governmentally inactive.

Municipalities range in size from the very small (e.g., the village of Monowi, Nebraska, with only 1 resident), to the very large (e.g., New York City, with about 8.5 million people), and this is reflected in the range of types of municipal governments that exist in different areas. There are approximately 30,000 incorporated cities in the United States, with varying degrees of self-rule.

In most states, county and municipal governments exist side by side. There are exceptions to this, however. In some states, a city can, either by separating from its county or counties or by merging with one or more counties, become independent of any separately functioning county government and function both as a county and as a city. Depending on the state, such a city is known as either an independent city or a consolidated city-county. A consolidated city-county differs from an independent city in that in a consolidated city-county, the city and county both nominally exist, although they have a consolidated government, whereas in an independent city, the county does not even nominally exist. Such a jurisdiction constitutes a county-equivalent and is analogous to a unitary authority in other countries. In Connecticut, Rhode Island, and parts of Massachusetts, counties exist only to designate boundaries for such state-level functions as park districts or judicial offices (Massachusetts). In Puerto Rico, Guam, and Northern Mariana Islands, there are municipalities (villages in Guam) and no counties. (Municipalities in PR and the NMI are used as county equivalents by the U.S. Census, but Guam is treated as a single county.) There are no municipal governments in the District of Columbia and the United States Virgin Islands; only the district-wide and territory-wide governments under federal jurisdiction.

=== Special-purpose local governments ===
In addition to general-purpose government entities legislating at the state, county, and city level, special-purpose areas may exist as well. Conservation districts are one such type of special purpose area, created for the purpose of conserving land, natural scenery, flora, and fauna.

There are also numerous "special district governments" in existence throughout the various states. According to the U.S. Census Bureau, such governments are:

independent, special-purpose governmental units (other than school district governments) that exist as separate entities with substantial administrative and fiscal independence from general-purpose local governments. Special district governments provide specific services that are not being supplied by existing general-purpose governments. Most perform a single function, but, in some instances, their enabling legislation allows them to provide several, usually related, types of services. The services provided by these districts range from such basic social needs as hospitals and fire protection to the less conspicuous tasks of mosquito abatement and upkeep of cemeteries. The Census Bureau classification of special district governments covers a wide variety of entities, most of which are officially called districts or authorities.

Additionally, U.S. courts have ruled that there are smaller areas which are to be considered as fulfilling government functions, and should therefore be bound by the same restrictions placed on "traditional" local government bodies. These include homeowners associations (determined in Shelley v. Kraemer, Loren v. Sasser, Committee for a Better Twin Rivers v. Twin Rivers Homeowners' Association), and company-owned towns (both for employees and for consumers, decided in the USSC case Marsh v. Alabama in 1946). Many homeowners' and neighborhood associations are considered non-profit organizations, but have the ability to raise taxes or fees, fine members for infractions against association-rules, and initiate lawsuits. The question of civil rights in such communities has not yet been conclusively determined, and varies from state to state.

==== School districts ====
School districts are organized local entities providing public elementary and secondary education which, under state law, have sufficient administrative and fiscal autonomy to qualify as separate governments. The category excludes dependent public school systems of county, municipal, township, or state governments (e.g., school divisions).

==== Special districts ====
Special districts are all organized local entities other than the four categories listed above, authorized by state law to provide designated functions as established in the district's charter or other founding document, and with sufficient administrative and fiscal autonomy to qualify as separate governments; known by a variety of titles, including districts, authorities, boards, commissions, etc., as specified in the enabling state legislation. A special district may serve areas of multiple states if established by an interstate compact. Special districts are widely popular and have enjoyed "phenomenal growth". From 1952 to 2007, the number of special districts increased by 203%, from 12,340 to 37,381. They are "the most common form of government in the United States."

== Councils of governments ==
It is common for residents of major U.S. metropolitan areas to live under six or more layers of special districts as well as a town or city, and a county or township. In turn, a typical metro area often consists of several counties, several dozen towns or cities, and a hundred (or more) special districts. In one state, California, the fragmentation problem became so bad that in 1963 the California Legislature created Local Agency Formation Commissions in 57 of the state's 58 counties; that is, government agencies to supervise the orderly formation and development of other government agencies. One effect of all this complexity is that victims of government negligence occasionally sue the wrong entity and do not realize their error until the statute of limitations has run against them.

Because efforts at direct consolidation have proven futile, U.S. local government entities often form "councils of governments", "metropolitan regional councils", or "associations of governments". These organizations serve as regional planning agencies and as forums for debating issues of regional importance, but are generally powerless relative to their individual members. Since the late 1990s, "a movement, frequently called 'New Regionalism', accepts the futility of seeking consolidated regional governments and aims instead for regional structures that do not supplant local governments."

== Dillon's Rule ==
Unlike the relationship of federalism that exists between the U.S. government and the states (in which power is shared), municipal governments have no power beyond what is granted to them by their states. This legal doctrine, called Dillon's Rule, was established by Judge John Forrest Dillon in 1872 and upheld by the U.S. Supreme Court in Hunter v. Pittsburgh, 207 U.S. 161 (1907), which upheld the power of Pennsylvania to consolidate the city of Allegheny into the city of Pittsburgh, despite the wishes of the majority of Allegheny residents.

In effect, state governments can place whatever restrictions they choose on their municipalities (including merging municipalities, controlling them directly, or abolishing them outright), as long as such rules do not violate the state's constitution.

== Home Rule ==
Dillon's Rule is the default rule, but some state constitutions and state statutes provide home rule authority for local governments. State constitutions and statutes which allow counties or municipalities to enact ordinances without the legislature's express permission are said to provide home rule authority. New Jersey, for example, provides for home rule.

Under home rule authority, local governments have implicit authority to govern themselves, unless specifically denied by the state. This is especially true of matters of local concern.

== Structure ==
The nature of both county and municipal government varies not only between states, but also between different counties and municipalities within them. Local voters are generally free to choose the basic framework of government from a selection established by state law.

In most cases both counties and municipalities have a governing council, governing in conjunction with a mayor or president. Alternatively, the institution may be of the council–manager government form, run by a city manager under direction of the city council. In the past the municipal commission was also common. In March 2025, local governments employed 14.7 million people, or 72.2 percent of combined state and local government employment. Of the local government total, 11.7 million employees were full-time and 3.0 million were part-time.

The ICMA has classified local governments into five common forms: mayor–council, council–manager, commission, town meeting, and representative town meeting.

=== Elections ===
In addition to elections for a council or mayor, elections are often also held for positions such as local judges, the sheriff, prosecutors, and other offices. Local governments across the US consist of hundreds of thousands of elected officials. Local elections are often marked by "abysmally low" voter turnout, as these elections are de-synchronized from state and federal elections. A 2009 study found that less than 40% of registered voters participate in local elections for mayor and city council. Turnout is highest among homeowners, the elderly, and the wealthy.

== Indian reservations ==
While their territory nominally falls within the boundaries of individual states, Indian reservations actually function outside of state control. The reservation is usually controlled by an elected tribal council which provides local services, and some reservations have their own determined subdivisions.

=== Chapter (Navajo Nation) ===
Navajo Nation is divided into five agencies. The most local form of government in the Navajo Nation is the Chapter, which deals with local responsibilities expected of a municipal government.

== Census of local government ==
A census of all local governments in the country is performed every five years by the United States Census Bureau, in accordance with 13 USC 161.

Governments in the United States (not including insular areas)
Type	Number
Federal	1
State	50
County	3,034
Municipal (city, town, village...) *	19,429
Township (in some states called Town) **	16,504
School district	13,506
Special purpose (utility, fire, police, library, etc.)	35,052
Total	87,576

* note: Municipalities are any incorporated places, such as cities, towns, villages, boroughs, etc.
** note: New England towns and towns in New York and Wisconsin are classified as civil townships for census purposes.

== Examples in individual states ==
The following sections provide details of the operation of local government in a selection of states, by way of example of the variety that exists across the country.

=== Alabama ===
Alabama has 67 counties. Each county has its own elected legislative branch, usually called the county commission. It also has limited executive authority in the county. Because of the constraints of the Alabama Constitution, which centralizes power in the state legislature, only seven counties (Jefferson, Lee, Mobile, Madison, Montgomery, Shelby, and Tuscaloosa) in the state have limited home rule. Instead, most counties in the state must lobby the Local Legislation Committee of the state legislature to get simple local policies approved, ranging from waste disposal to land use zoning.

=== Alaska ===
Alaska calls its county equivalents "boroughs", functioning similarly to counties in the Lower 48; however, unlike any other state, not all of Alaska is subdivided into county-equivalent boroughs. Owing to the state's low population density, most of the land is contained in what the state terms the Unorganized Borough which, as the name implies, has no intermediate borough government of its own, but is administered directly by the state government. Many of Alaska's boroughs are consolidated city-borough governments; other cities exist both within organized boroughs and the Unorganized Borough.

=== Arizona ===
Arizona is divided into political jurisdictions designated as counties, which derive all of their power from the state. Incorporated cities and towns are those that have been granted home rule, possessing a local government in the form of a city or town council.

=== California ===
California has several different and overlapping forms of local government. Cities, counties, and the one consolidated city-county can make ordinances (local laws), including the establishment and enforcement of civil and criminal penalties.

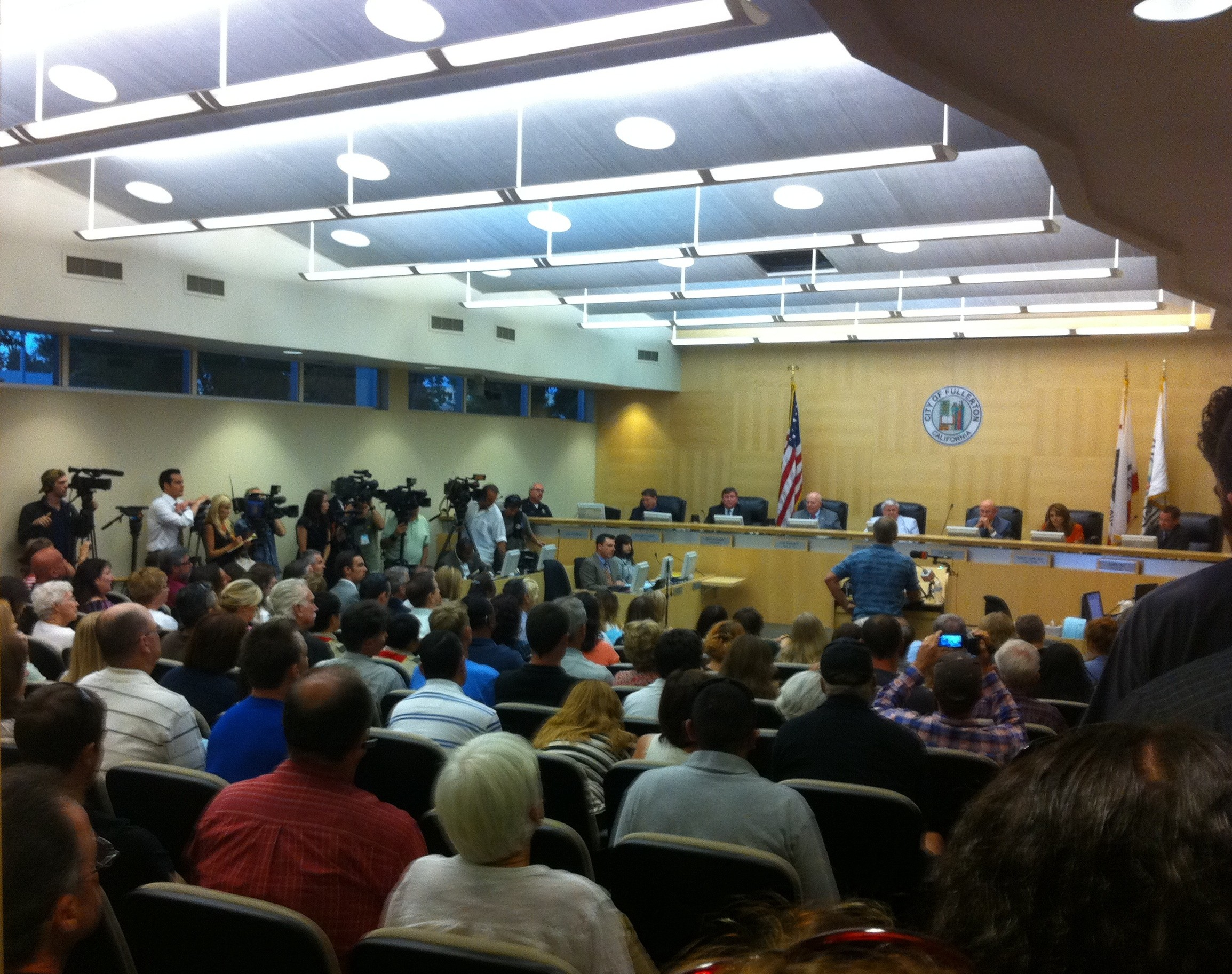
A city council meeting in Fullerton, California

The entire state is subdivided into 58 counties. The only type of municipal entity is the city, although cities may either operate under "general law" or a custom-drafted charter. California has never had villages. Some cities call themselves "towns", but the name "town" is purely cosmetic with no legal effect. As a result, California has several towns with large populations in the tens of thousands and several cities that are home to only a few hundred people.

California cities are granted broad plenary powers under the California Constitution. For example, Los Angeles runs its own water and power utilities and its own elevator inspection department, while many other cities rely upon private utilities and the state elevator inspectors. San Francisco is the only consolidated city-county in the state.

The city of Lakewood pioneered the Lakewood Plan, a plan under which the city reimburses a county for performing services which are more efficiently performed on a countywide basis. Such contracts have become more widespread throughout California, as they enable city governments to concentrate on particular local concerns. A city that contracts out most of its services is known as a contract city.

There are also "special districts", which are areas with a defined territory in which a specific service is provided, such as port or fire districts. These districts lack plenary power to enact laws, but do have the power to promulgate administrative regulations that often carry the force of law within land directly regulated by such districts. Many special districts, particularly those created to provide public transportation or education, have their own police departments.

=== District of Columbia ===
The District of Columbia is unique within the United States in that it is under the direct authority of the U.S. Congress, rather than forming part of any state. Actual government has been delegated under the District of Columbia Home Rule Act to a district council which effectively also has the powers given to county or state governments in other areas. Under the act, the Council of the District of Columbia has the power to write laws, as a state's legislature would, moving the bill to the mayor to sign into law. Following this, the United States Congress has the power to overturn the law.

=== Georgia ===
The state of Georgia is divided into 159 counties (the largest number of any state other than Texas), each of which has had home rule since at least 1980. This means that Georgia's counties not only act as units of state government, but also in much the same way as municipalities.

All municipalities are classed as a "city", regardless of population size. For an area to be incorporated as a city, special legislation has to be passed by the General Assembly (state legislature); typically the legislation requires a referendum amongst local voters to approve incorporation, to be passed by a simple majority. This most recently happened in 2005 and 2006 in several communities near Atlanta. Sandy Springs, a city of 85,000 bordering the north side of Atlanta, incorporated in December 2005. One year later, Johns Creek (62,000) and Milton (20,000) incorporated, which meant that the entirety of north Fulton County was now municipalized. The General Assembly also approved a plan that would potentially establish two new cities in the remaining unincorporated portions of Fulton County south of Atlanta: South Fulton and Chattahoochee Hills. Chattahoochee Hills voted to incorporate in December 2007; South Fulton voted against incorporation, and was the only remaining unincorporated portion of Fulton County until 2017.

City charters may be revoked either by the legislature or by a simple majority referendum of the city's residents; the latter last happened in 2004, in Lithia Springs. Revocation by the legislature last occurred in 1995, when dozens of cities were eliminated en masse for not having active governments, or even for not offering at least three municipal services required of all cities.

New cities may not incorporate land less than 3 miles (4.8 km) from an existing city without approval from the General Assembly. The body approved all of the recent and upcoming creations of new cities in Fulton County.

Four areas have a "consolidated city-county" government: Columbus, since 1971; Athens, since 1991; Augusta, since 1996; and Macon, which was approved by voters in 2012.

=== Hawaii ===
Hawaii is the only U.S. state that has no incorporated municipalities. Instead it has five counties, generally coextensive with one or more of the islands. Most of the state's population resides in the "consolidated city-county" of Honolulu, on Oahu. All communities are considered to be census-designated places, with the exact boundaries being decided upon by co-operative agreement between the Governor's office and the U.S. Census Bureau.

Kalawao County, formed exclusively as a leper colony, is the second smallest county in the United States by population, lacks most government powers, and is often considered part of adjoining Maui County.

=== Louisiana ===
In Louisiana, counties are called parishes; likewise, the county seat is known as the parish seat. The difference in nomenclature does not reflect a fundamental difference in the nature of government, but is rather a reflection of the state's unique status as a former French and Spanish colony (although a small number of other states once had parishes too).

=== Maryland ===
Maryland has 23 counties. The State Constitution charters the City of Baltimore as an independent city, which is the functional equivalent of a county, and is separate from any county — e.g., there is also a Baltimore County, but its county seat is in Towson, not in the City of Baltimore. Other than Baltimore, all cities are the same, and there is no difference between a municipality called a city or a town. Cities and towns are chartered by the legislature.

=== Mississippi ===
Mississippi has 82 counties. The state law in the State Constitution establishes six different types of municipal governments.

=== New Mexico ===
New Mexico has 33 counties. These and cities and towns (Los Alamos County is a consolidated city-county) are established by Article X ("County and Municipal Corporations") of the state constitution.

=== North Carolina ===
North Carolina has 100 counties, the seventh highest number in the country.

The North Carolina Councils of Government (or the Regional Councils of Government) are voluntary associations of county and municipal governments, established by the North Carolina General Assembly in 1972 that serve as an avenue for local governments across North Carolina to discuss issues that are particular to their region. In banding together at the regional level, the voice of one community becomes the voice of many, thus providing a better opportunity for those issues to be addressed. Today the majority of citizens and local governments in North Carolina are represented by regional councils, making them an increasingly important facet of local government operations.

Today North Carolina calls itself home to 16 regional councils of government. Regional councils in North Carolina are committed to working together. In 2010 the seventeen regional councils existing at that time signed an inter-regional cooperative agreement that established a policy to enhance their value by sharing member resources and capacity to deliver services to the state of North Carolina. This agreement also endorses regional councils, to carry out activities in regions outside their boundaries with consent when those services are to benefit the region and the state. Regional boundaries correspond to county borders, with each council being made up of both county and municipal governments. Although the number of regional councils in North Carolina has decreased over the years, the number of citizens served by the councils continues to rise. As of 2007, it is reported that the number of local governments served by regional councils in North Carolina has increased by 16% since 1994. Throughout this same time period the number of citizens served by regional councils has increased by 35% or approximately 2.3 million. This equates to 92% of local governments and 97% of all North Carolina citizens being represented by regional councils as of July 1, 2007.

=== Pennsylvania ===
Pennsylvania has 67 counties. With the exception of Philadelphia and Allegheny County, counties are governed by three to seven county commissioners who are elected every four years; the district attorney, county treasurer, sheriff, and certain classes of judge ("judges of election") are also elected separately. Philadelphia has been a consolidated city-county since 1854 and has had a consolidated city-county government since 1952. Allegheny County has had a council/chief executive government since 2001, while still retaining its townships, boroughs and cities.

Each county is divided into municipal corporations, which can be one of four types: cities, boroughs, townships, and incorporated towns. The Commonwealth does not contain any unincorporated land that is not served by a local government. However, the US Postal Service has given names to places within townships that are not incorporated separately. For instance King of Prussia is a census-designated place, having no local government of its own. It is rather contained within Upper Merion Township, governed by Upper Merion's supervisors, and considered to be a part of the township.

Townships are divided into two classes, depending on their population size and density. Townships of the "First Class" have a board made up of five to fifteen commissioners who are elected either at-large or for a particular ward to four-year terms, while those of the "Second Class" have a board of three to five supervisors who are elected at-large to six-year terms. Some townships have adopted a home rule charter which allows them to choose their form of government. One example is Upper Darby Township, in Delaware County, which has chosen to have a "mayor-council" system similar to that of a borough.

Boroughs in Pennsylvania are governed by a "mayor-council" system in which the mayor has only a few powers (usually that of overseeing the municipal police department, if the borough has one), while the borough council has very broad appointment and oversight. The council president, who is elected by the majority party every two years, is equivalent to the leader of a council in the United Kingdom; with powers to operate within boundaries set by the state constitution and the borough's charter. A small minority of the boroughs have dropped the mayor-council system in favor of the council-manager system, in which the council appoints a borough manager to oversee the day-to-day operations of the borough. As in the case of townships, a number of boroughs have adopted home rule charters; one example is State College, which retains the mayor-council system that it had as a borough.

Bloomsburg is the Commonwealth's only incorporated town; McCandless Township in Allegheny County calls itself a town, but it officially remains a township with a home rule charter.

Cities in Pennsylvania are divided into four classes: Class 1, Class 2, Class 2A, and Class 3. Class 3 cities, which are the smallest, have either a mayor-council system or a council-manager system like that of a borough, although the mayor or city manager has more oversight and duties compared to their borough counterparts. Pittsburgh and Scranton are the state's only Class 2 and Class 2A cities respectively, and have mayors with some veto power, but are otherwise still governed mostly by their city councils.

Philadelphia is the Commonwealth's only Class 1 city. It has a government similar to that of the Commonwealth itself, with a mayor with strong appointment and veto powers and a 17-member city council that has both law-making and confirmation powers. Certain types of legislation that can be passed by the city government require state legislation before coming into force. Unlike the other cities in Pennsylvania, the Philadelphia city government also has oversight of county government, and as such controls the budget for the district attorney, sheriff, and other county offices that have been retained from the county's one-time separate existence; these offices are elected for separately than those for the city government proper.

=== Texas ===
Texas has 254 counties, the most of any state.

Each county is governed by a five-member Commissioners Court, which consists of a county judge (elected at-large) and four commissioners (elected from single-member precincts). The county judge has no veto authority over the decisions of the court; and has one vote along with the other commissioners. In smaller counties, the county judge also performs judicial functions, while in larger counties the county judge's role is limited to the court. Elections are held on a partisan basis.

Counties have no home rule authority; their authority is strictly limited by the State. They operate in areas which are considered "unincorporated" (those parts not within the territory of a city; Texas does not have townships) unless the city has contracted with the county for essential services. In plain English, Texas counties merely exist to deliver specific types of services at the local level as prescribed by state law, but cannot enact or enforce local ordinances.

As one textbook produced for use in Texas schools has openly acknowledged, Texas counties are prone to inefficient operations and are vulnerable to corruption, for several reasons. First, most of them do not have a merit system but operate on a spoils system, so that many county employees obtain their positions through loyalty to a particular political party and commissioner rather than whether they actually have the skills and experience appropriate to their positions. Second, most counties have not centralized purchasing into a single procurement department which would be able to seek quantity discounts and carefully scrutinize bids and contract awards for unusual patterns. Third, in 90% of Texas counties, each commissioner is individually responsible for planning and executing their own road construction and maintenance program for their own precinct, which results in poor coordination and duplicate construction machinery.

All incorporated municipalities are technically considered cities, even though the municipality may refer to itself as a town or village. Cities may be either general law or home rule. Once a city reaches 5,000 in population, it may submit a ballot petition to create a "city charter" and operate under home rule status (they will maintain that status even if the population falls under 5,000) and may choose its own form of government (weak or strong mayor-council, commission, council-manager). Otherwise the city operates under general law; those cities have only those powers authorized by the State. Annexation policies are highly dependent on whether the city is general law (annexation can only occur with the consent of the landowners) or home rule (no consent is required, but if the city fails to provide essential services, the landowners can petition for de-annexation), and city boundaries can cross county ones. The city council can be elected either at-large or from single-member districts (Houston uses a two-layer single-member district structure), or a mixture of the two. Ballots are on a nonpartisan basis (though, generally, the political affiliation of the candidates is commonly known).

With the exception of the Stafford Municipal School District, all 1,000+ school districts in Texas are "independent" school districts. State law requires seven trustees, which can be elected either at-large or from single-member districts. Ballots are non-partisan. Although Texas law allows for home rule school districts, no district has applied to become such. The Texas Education Agency (TEA) has state authority to order closure and consolidation of school districts, generally for repeated failing performance; the former Wilmer-Hutchins Independent School District was an example of a failing district closed by TEA.

In addition, state law allows the creation of special districts, such as hospital districts or water supply districts. All of these districts are governed by state law; there is no home rule option.

Texas does not provide for independent cities nor for consolidated city-county governments. However, local governments are free to enter into "interlocal agreements" with other ones, primarily for efficiency purposes. (A common example is for cities and school districts in a county to contract with the county for property tax collection; thus, each resident receives only one property bill.)

=== Virginia ===
Virginia is divided into 95 counties and 38 cities. All cities are independent cities, which mean that they are separate from, and independent of, any county they may be near or within. Cities in Virginia thus are the equivalent of counties, as they have no higher local government intervening between them and the state government. The equivalent in Virginia to what would normally be an incorporated city in any other state, e.g. a municipality subordinate to a county, is a town. For example, there is a County of Fairfax as well as a totally independent City of Fairfax, which technically is not part of Fairfax County even though the City of Fairfax is the county seat of Fairfax County. Within Fairfax County, however, is the incorporated town of Vienna, which is part of Fairfax County. Similar names do not necessarily reflect relationships; Franklin County is far from the city of Franklin, while Charles City is an unincorporated community in Charles City County, and there is no city of Charles.

=== Other states ===
- Local government in Colorado
- Local government in Connecticut
- Administrative divisions of Indiana
- Administrative divisions of Massachusetts
- Administrative divisions of Michigan
- Local government in New Hampshire
- Local government in New Jersey
- Local government in New Mexico
- Administrative divisions of New York
- Administrative divisions of Ohio
- Administrative divisions of Wisconsin

== List of city governments ==
US City Councils of the 30 largest Cities
2020 city pop. rank	City	City Council	Government Type	Total Number of Seats	District Elected Seats	At-large represented Seats	2020 pop. estimate	Constituents per Councilmember
1	New York City	New York City Council	Mayor–council	51	51		8,253,213	161,828
2	Los Angeles	Los Angeles City Council	Mayor–council	15	15		3,970,219	264,681
3	Chicago	Chicago City Council	Mayor–council	50	50		2,677,643	53,523
4	Houston	Houston City Council	Mayor–council	16	11	5	2,316,120	144,758
5	Phoenix	Phoenix City Council	Council–manager	9	8	1 (Mayor)	1,708,127	189,791
6	Philadelphia	Philadelphia City Council	Mayor–council	17	10	7	1,578,487	92,852
7	San Antonio	San Antonio City Council	Council–manager	11	10	1 (Mayor)	1,567,118	142,465
8	San Diego	San Diego City Council	Mayor–council	9	9		1,422,420	158,047
9	Dallas	Dallas City Council	Council–manager	15	14	1 (Mayor)	1,343,266	89,551
10	San Jose	San Jose City Council	Council–manager	11	10	1 (Mayor)	1,013,616	92,147
11	Austin	Austin City Council	Council–manager	11	10	1 (Mayor)	995,484	90,499
12	Fort Worth	Fort Worth City Council	Council–manager	9	8	1 (Mayor)	927,720	103,080
13	Jacksonville	Jacksonville City Council	Mayor–council	19	14	5	920,570	48,451
14	Columbus	Columbus City Council	Mayor–council	7		7	903,852	129,122
15	Charlotte	Charlotte City Council	Council–manager	12	7	5 (Mayor +4)	900,350	75,029
16	Indianapolis	Indianapolis City-County Council	Mayor–council	25	25		877,903	35,116
17	San Francisco	San Francisco Board of Supervisors	Mayor–council	11	11		866,606	78,782
18	Seattle	Seattle City Council	Mayor–council	9	7	2	769,714	85,524
19	Denver	Denver City Council	Mayor–council	13	11	2	735,538	56,580
20	Washington, D.C.	Council of the District of Columbia	N/A (District of Columbia Home Rule Act)	13	8	5	712,816	54,832
21	Boston	Boston City Council	Mayor–council	13	9	4	691,531	53,195
22	El Paso	El Paso City Council	Council–manager	9	8	1 (Mayor)	681,534	75,726
23	Nashville	Metropolitan Council of Nashville and Davidson County	Mayor–council	41	35	6 (Vice-Mayor +5)	671,295	16,373
24	Detroit	Detroit City Council	Mayor–council	9	7	2	665,369	73,930
25	Las Vegas	Las Vegas City Council	Council–manager	7	6	1 (Mayor)	662,368	94,624
26	Oklahoma City	Oklahoma City Council	Council–manager	9	8	1 (Mayor)	662,314	73,590
27	Portland	Portland City Council	Mayor–council	12	12 (3 per district)		656,751	54,729
28	Memphis	Memphis City Council	Mayor–council	13	13		649,705	49,977
29	Louisville	Louisville Metro Council	Mayor–council	26	26		618,338	23,782
30	Milwaukee	Milwaukee Common Council	Mayor–council	15	15		589,067	39,271

== See also ==
- Home rule
- Partial list of chapter 9 bankruptcies of the United States
- Urban politics in the United States
