= Caro Community Schools =

School district in Michigan, United States

Address
- 301 North Hooper Street Caro, Tuscola County, Michigan, 48723; United States

District information
- Motto: Cultivate Excellence
- Grades: Pre-Kindergarten-12
- Superintendent: George Rierson
- Schools: 5
- Budget: $22,952,000 2022-2023 expenditures
- NCES District ID: 2608040

Students and staff
- Students: 1,383 (2024-2025)
- Teachers: 89.33 (on an FTE basis) (2024-2025)
- Staff: 281.79 FTE (2024-2025)
- Student–teacher ratio: 15.48 (2024-2025)

Other information
- Website: www.carok12.org

Caro Community Schools is a public school district in the Thumb region of Michigan. It serves Caro, Indianfields Township, and parts of the townships of Almer, Columbia, Fairgrove, Fremont, Juniata, and Wells.

== History ==
The first school in Caro (then called Centerville) was built by pioneer Peter D. Bush in 1857. The public school district was organized the next year. Bush would go on to build other schools in Caro during the 1800s. On the site of the current Schall Elementary, a Union School was built in 1868, and a high school was added to the site in 1887. When Schall Elementary was built in 1924, it replaced the 1868 building and was connected to the 1887 building. Schall Elementary was named after a long-serving superintendent. In 1948, a one-story elementary school was built on the same site.

The current Caro High School began as an elementary school building known as Kern Hall in 1955. Around this time, Caro's school district was attempting to consolidate with the small, independent school districts in its outlying townships to expand its tax base so it could build a modern high school. Caro was growing and would one day no longer be able to guarantee a high school education to those districts' students, who attended Caro High on a tuition basis.

Contributing to this need was the closure of the 1887 school. It had become a grade school when the Schall building opened in 1924. The old school was closed in March 1954 because it was a safety hazard, and that May the school board deemed it uneconomical to repair. The 1887 school was then torn down.

In 1956, a bond issue passed to substantially expand Kern Hall to become a middle/high school, reopening in fall 1958. It was dedicated on January 25, 1959. Additions were built in 1964 and 1978.

McComb Elementary was dedicated on January 29, 1967. It was named after Ben H. McComb, a county school commissioner.

Most of the wing housing Caro Middle School, the former Kern Hall wing, was rebuilt around 2006. (Note: Comparing the high school floor plan in the 1959 yearbook with current satellite images shows the wing labelled "Kern Hall" was torn down and a building with the address of the middle school was built to the east of the 1958 high school building.)

== Schools ==
Schools in Caro Community Schools district
School	Address	Notes
Caro High School	301 North Hooper St., Caro	Grades 9–12. Built 1958.
Caro Middle School	299 North Hooper St., Caro	Grades 6–8
Schall Elementary	325 East Frank St., Caro	Grades 3–5. Built 1924.
McComb Elementary	303 North Hooper St., Caro	Grades PreK-2
Caro Alternative High School	217 N State St., Caro	Alternative high school
