= Mayville Community Schools =

School district in Michigan

Address
- 6250 Fulton Street Mayville, Tuscola County, Michigan, 48741; United States

District information
- Grades: Kindergarten–12
- Superintendent: Mike Seaman
- Schools: 2
- Budget: $9,390,000 2022–2023 expenditures
- NCES District ID: 2623280

Students and staff
- Students: 532 (2024–2025)
- Teachers: 31.71 (on an FTE basis) (2024–2025)
- Staff: 98.17 FTE (2024–2025)
- Student–teacher ratio: 16.78 (2024–2025)
- District mascot: Wildcats

Other information
- Website: www.mayvilleschools.org

Mayville Community Schools is a public school district in The Thumb region of Michigan. In Tuscola County, it serves Mayville and parts of the townships of Dayton, Fremont, and Watertown. In Lapeer County, it serves parts of Burlington and Rich townships.

== History ==
There has been a school on the current site of Mayville High School since 1880, when a one-room school was moved there and a second classroom was built onto it. The first class graduated in 1886.

A two-story brick school was built in 1888 and expanded in 1912. A fire destroyed the school on March 17, 1932.

The oldest section of the current Mayville Middle/High School, built on the same site, opened on June 8, 1933 with a presentation of the student play "Are You Girl Shy?" The building opened for classes that fall, and was dedicated on November 24, 1933 as the culmination of the annual Thumb potato exhibit. The school was described in the Flint Journal:

The building, which will house 12 grades, an auditorium to be used as a social center, manual training and home economic departments, will cost $54,000... The building is constructed of face brick with Bedford limestone trim and steel construction joists are being used in the wall, roof and floors. The auditorium and class room floors will be of maple, while terrazzo floors will be laid in the fireproof corridors and wash rooms. A feature of the classrooms will be the oak trim.

Mayville Elementary was built in 1960. In April 1969, a new high school opened next to the previous high school. The bell from the 1888 school was installed in a brick enclosure on the lawn and on October 9, 1970, it was dedicated to long-serving school board member Duane Sugden. The bell had been discovered underground with the buried debris of the burned school in 1955.

By 1973, the district was overcrowded. At that time, the district had two elementary schools: The one near the high school and a small school in Fostoria that held only third grade. The high school was located in the 1969 building, and the 1933 building held grades four to eight. To alleviate the crowding, voters approved an addition to Mayville Elementary, built in 1974 and 1975.

Voters approved a $14.135 million bond issue in 2004 to renovate and improve district facilities. The issue passed by seven votes.

== Schools ==
Schools in Mayville Community Schools
School	Address	Notes
Mayville Middle & High School	6250 Fulton St., Mayville	Grades 6–12
Mayville Elementary	106 Orchard St, Mayville	Grades K-5
