= McBain Rural Agricultural School =

American public school

Coordinates: 44.1947°N 85.2094°W

Address
- 107 East Maple Street McBain, Missaukee County, Michigan, 49657; United States

District information
- Grades: PreKindergarten-12
- Superintendent: Scott Akom
- Schools: 3
- Budget: $13,371,000 2021-2022 expenditures
- NCES District ID: 2623310

Students and staff
- Students: 1,081 (2024-2025)
- Teachers: 61.81 (on an FTE basis) (2024-2025)
- Staff: 143.23 FTE (2024-2025)
- Student–teacher ratio: 17.49 (2024-2025)

Other information
- Website: www.mcbain.org

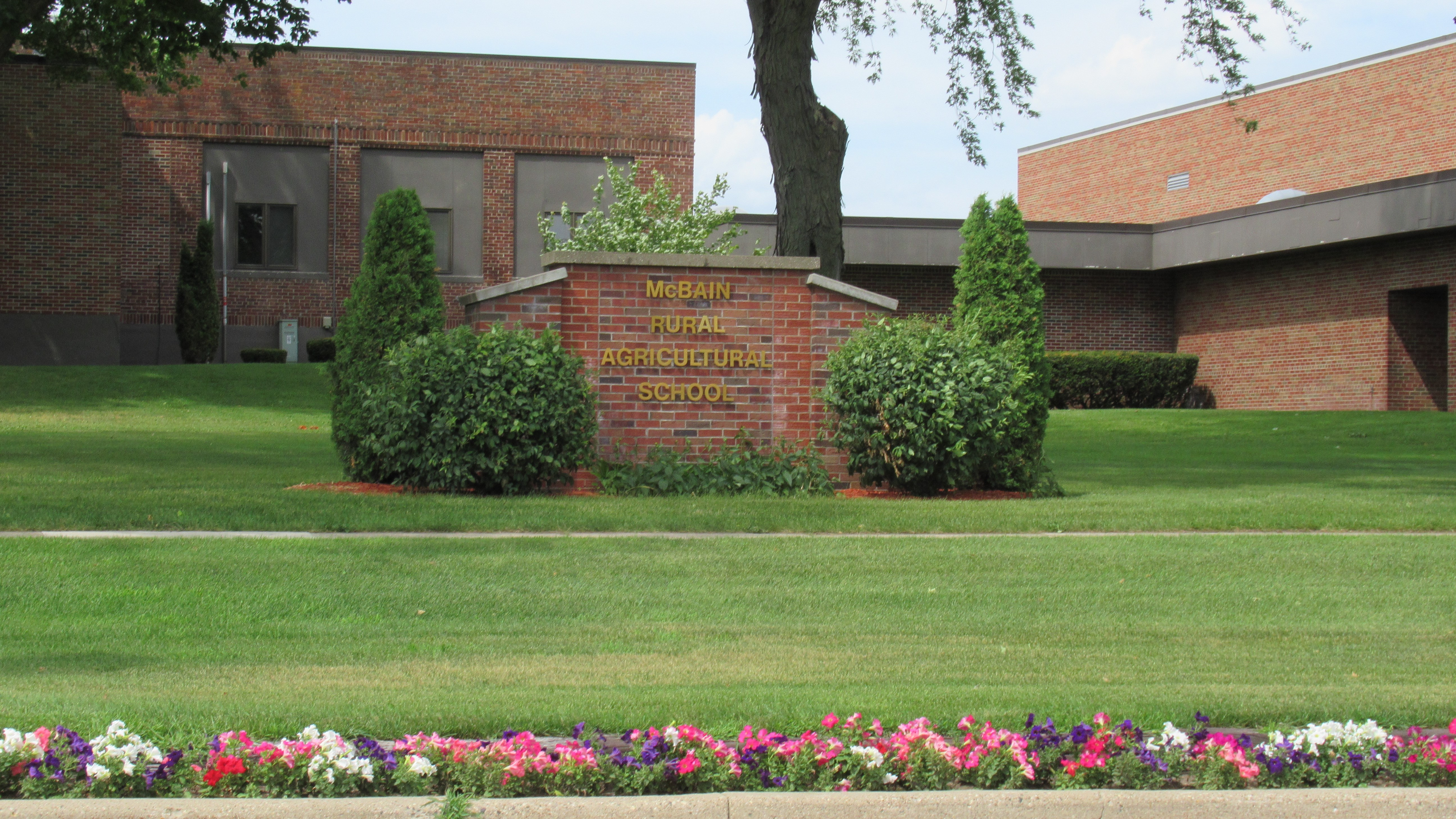
McBain High School along M-66

McBain Rural Agricultural School is a K-12 public school in McBain, Michigan. It is within the McBain Rural Agricultural School District. The school is also known as McBain Public School. The school was founded in 1880.

Origin of Mascot- Ramblers

Though there is no official history to the origin of the mascot, there are 2 popular stories to how McBain Rural Agricultural School became the McBain Ramblers. Story number 1- When McBain High School built its first gym in 1951, it was only half a court. Therefore, McBain was unable to play any home games and had to "ramble" across the countryside to play games. The name stuck and McBain High School became the Ramblers. Story number 2- The founding fathers of Owen (later to be renamed McBain) they came across on two different ships from the Netherlands-Wandelaar and Komeet. Wandelaar translates in English to Rambler and Komeet translates in English to Comet. Therefore, in honor of the founders, McBain Rural Agricultural School became the Ramblers and McBain Northern Michigan Christian School adopted the Comets as their mascot.

Noteworthy events in school history On January 5, 1929, a fire broke out in the old school building, causing the destruction of the building.

Reconstruction of the new school building began soon after, preparing the school district for the new school to open in the fall of 1929. This newly constructed school building featured a number of new rooms, including 7 spacious classrooms, a fully equipped gym, and a study hall.

In 1945, surrounding school districts joined the McBain schools. Those schools included: Galt, Forward, Vogel Center, Hillside, Lucas, Blodgett, Summerville, Cavanagh, Ardis, Pleasant Valley, Diremeyer, and Pleasant Point. Two more schools joined McBain in 1958: Brunink and Bosscher Schools.

In 2015, the school posted a job advertisement for a superintendent stating that the applicant must have "a strong Christian background and philosophy". The quote was removed after the American Civil Liberties Union criticized it, and the school made an apology.

The Origin of McBain Football

In 1924, William DeHart, a 1st year teacher at McBain Rural Agricultural School, assembled the first high school football team. They played one game their first season against the Trojans of Lake City High School. Lake City was victorious 68-0.

Rebirth of McBain football

In the spring of 1970, the male students of McBain Rural Agricultural School submitted a petition to reinstate high school football. The petition was approved. In the fall of 1971, the McBain Ramblers played a 9 game JV schedule. In 1972, the team was moved to varsity level of competition and has been playing continuously since.

Notable Alumni

Trent Mulder Interceptions in a Season (2001): 18 Interception in his Career (2000-2001): 24

Hall of Fame

In 2025, McBain inaugurated the first class into the McBain Athletic Hall of Fame. The inductees were Bruce Brummels, Jim Racignol, and Harv Lucas.

McBain Hall of Fame:

Bruce Brumels

Coach Brumels is credited with laying the very foundations for the start of the McBain Boys Basketball program. Under his coaching from 1962 - 1987, the McBain Boys Varsity basketball program had 365 wins - 171 losses, 6 conference championships, 10 district championships, and the school’s very first regional championship in 1964!

Bruce Brumels’s contributions and influence extend way beyond the basketball court. He was an exceptional teacher for 26 years, teaching from history to government. He additionally became an Athletic Director for 14 years, before ending his career with 10 years as Principal.

Harvey Lucas

Mr. Harvey Lucas has made a profound impact on both the McBain football and basketball teams over the years. His voice is the one that welcomes us, informs us, and records our athletic history. This distinguished career makes Mr. Harvey Lucas the “Voice of McBain.”

His work has become fundamental to each and every single game played. During this time, when digital communication and high-tech systems are regular, Mr. Harvey Lucas has remained in his high pillar of accuracy, diligently keeping the official scorebook.

Jim Racignol

Coach James Racignol built his legacy not only by championships, but with character, commitment, and lifelong impact for generations of student athletes. Under Coach Racignol's leadership from 1977-2006. The softball program reached great success, securing 521 wins, 209 losses, 10 conference championships, and was a State-Runner-up in 1985.

Coach Racignol’s commitment to excellence elevated the athletic department and left a lasting legacy of McBain Softball. His passion for softball, for his athletes, and belief in the power of teamwork embodied the spirit of the Hall of Fame.

Coach James Racignol was inducted into the Michigan High School Softball Coaches Association Hall of Fame in 2004. Additionally, he was an outstanding teacher who gave 33 years to the McBain Math Department.
