= Lake City Area Schools =

School district in Michigan, United States

Address
- 710 East Mitchell St. Lake City, Missaukee, Michigan, 49651; United States

District information
- Grades: PreKindergarten-12
- Superintendent: Dr. Timothy Hejnal
- Schools: 3
- Budget: $15,869,000 2021-2022 expenditures
- NCES District ID: 2620610

Students and staff
- Students: 1,142 (2023-2024)
- Teachers: 72.4 (on an FTE basis) (2023-2024)
- Staff: 190.18 FTE (2023-2024)
- Student–teacher ratio: 15.77 (2023-2024)

Other information
- Website: www.lakecityschools.net

Lake City Area Schools is a public school district in Northern Michigan. In Missaukee County, it serves Lake City, the townships of Forest, Norwich, and Pioneer, and parts of the townships of Aetna, Bloomfield, Butterfield, Caldwell, Enterprise, Lake, Reeder, and West Branch.

== History ==
The current Lake City High School was built around 1958.

In 2016, a bond issue passed to renovate and expand school facilities. The project moved the middle school students to the high school campus and the former middle school became an elementary school.

== Schools ==
Schools in Lake City Area Schools district
School	Address	Notes
Lake City High School	251 Russell Road., Lake City	Grades 9-12.
Lake City Middle School	251 Russell Road, Lake City	Grades 6-8.
Lake City Elementary	5534 West Davis Road, Lake City	Grades K-5.
Lake City Schools Pre-K	710 East Mitchell St., Lake City	Preschool
Lake City Schools Virtual Academy	251 Russell Road, Lake City	Online learning options
