= Ann Arbor Learning Community =

Coordinates: 42°13′53.2″N 83°44′02.2″W

Ann Arbor Learning Community (AALC) is a K-12 public charter school in Ann Arbor, Michigan, authorized by Eastern Michigan University. Enrollment is open to all K-12 students residing within the state of Michigan. Because AALC is part of the public school system, tuition is not charged to any student desiring to attend.

AALC first opened its doors in the fall of 1998. With small, multi-age classrooms, AALC seeks to meet the individual needs of all students. The school currently has one Early Primary (K-1) classroom, one Primary (2-3) classroom, one Intermediate (4-5) classroom and two Middle School (6-8) classrooms. Students also have music, art, and physical education classes. Intermediate and Middle School students are given the opportunity to be a member of the instrumental music program.

In the fall of 2021, Eastern Michigan University (EMU) announced that it would not renew AALC's charter, which was scheduled to expire in the summer of 2022, citing a steep drop in enrollment and other concerns. AALC contended that it should not be penalized for the enrollment drop, alleging that the management company which it had hired, Global Educational Excellence had falsely inflated its enrollment figures. According to EMU, AALC's enrollment had declined from 273 students in the 2020-21 school year to less than forty, and had lost virtually all of its high school enrollment following the dispute with GEE.

== Extracurricular Activities ==
Ann Arbor Learning Community does not offer any sports teams, although girls can choose to participate in Girls on the Run. Intermediate and middle school students may also join an after school history club with the goal of participating in the Michigan History Day and National History Day competitions. In the 2011–2012 school year, two middle school students from Ann Arbor Learning Community advanced to the national level of competition and another was named an alternate.
