= Hopkins Public Schools (Michigan) =

School district in Michigan

Address
- 400 Clark Street Hopkins, Allegan County, Michigan, 49230; United States
- Coordinates: 42°37′16.07″N 85°45′39.42″W

District information
- Type: Public
- Grades: Pre-Kindergarten-12
- Established: 1884; 142 years ago
- Superintendent: Scott VanBonn
- Schools: 4
- Budget: $22,700,000 2022-2023 expenditures
- NCES District ID: 2618570

Students and staff
- Students: 1,419 (2024-2025)
- Teachers: 93.58 (on an FTE basis) (2024-2025)
- Staff: 163.54 FTE (2024-2025)
- Student–teacher ratio: 15.16 (2024-2025)
- District mascot: Vikings
- Colors: Blue, White

Other information
- Website: www.hpsvikings.org

Hopkins Public Schools is a public school district in Allegan County, Michigan. It serves Hopkins and parts of the townships of Allegan, Dorr, Hopkins, Monterey, Salem, and Watson. It is a member of the Allegan Area Educational Service Agency.

== History ==
The public school district in Hopkins was established in 1844. In 1941, the community was discussing consolidation with the outlying small school districts in the township, with the intention of ultimately consolidating with districts outside of the township as well. This had occurred by at least 1945, when voters approved an addition to the Hopkins Township Consolidated School.

The 1958 yearbook shows photographs of the school from that time: An older multistory red brick building with central bell tower and the aforementioned addition, which was built around 1946. An addition housing the high school opened in fall 1958, replacing the oldest section of the school. Guido Binda was the architect.

In 1985, 55 acres of a historic farm property called the Wise Farm was donated to the school district. It is used in the district's science and history curriculums and for recreation.

A millage increase in 1996 funded construction of the current Hopkins High School. The previous middle/high school, which housed grades seven to twelve, had been overcrowded. The new high school opened in fall 1999 and the former middle/high school was renovated to be a middle school for grades six to eight.

A $17,950,000 bond issue passed in 2007 to expand and renovate district facilities. It funded additions at the high school and elementary schools.

== Schools ==
Hopkins Public Schools operates four schools. Sycamore Elementary is located in Dorr Township, and the others are located on a campus in Hopkins.

Schools in Hopkins Public Schools
School	Address	Notes
Hopkins High School	333 S Clark Street, Hopkins	Grades 9-12. Built 1999.
Hopkins Middle School	215 Clark Street, Hopkins	Grades 6-8.
Hopkins Elementary	400 Clark Street, Hopkins	Grades PreK-5
Sycamore Elementary School	2163 142nd Ave., Dorr	Grades PreK-5
