= List of intermediate school districts in Michigan =

An intermediate school district (ISD) in the state of Michigan is a government agency usually organized at the county or multi-county level that assists a local school district in providing programs and services. The following table lists every Intermediate school district in Michigan.

- For local education agency (LEA) districts, which include public schools, see list of local education agency districts in Michigan.
- For public school academy (PSA) districts, which include charter schools, see list of public school academy districts in Michigan.

District name	Dist. ID	County	Web site
Allegan Area Educational Service Agency	03000	Allegan	www.alleganaesa.org
Alpena–Montmorency–Alcona Education Service District	04000	Alpena; Montmorency; Alcona	www.amaesd.net
Barry Intermediate School District	08000	Barry	www.barryisd.org
Bay–Arenac Intermediate School District	09000	Arenac; Bay	www.baisd.net
Berrien Regional Educational Service Agency	11000	Berrien	www.berrienresa.org
Branch Intermediate School District	12000	Branch	branch-isd.org
C.O.O.R. Intermediate School District	72000	Crawford; Oscoda; Ogemaw; Roscommon	www.coorisd.net
Calhoun Intermediate School District	13000	Calhoun	www.calhounisd.org
Charlevoix–Emmet Intermediate School District	15000	Charlevoix; Emmet	www.charemisd.org
Cheboygan–Otsego–Presque Isle Education Service District	16000	Cheboygan; Otsego; Presque Isle	copesd.eup.k12.mi.us
Clare–Gladwin Regional Education Service District	18000	Clare; Gladwin	www.cgresd.net
Clinton County Regional Educational Service Agency	19000	Clinton	www.ccresa.org
Copper Country Intermediate School District	31000	Baraga; Houghton; Keweenaw	www.copperisd.org
Delta–Schoolcraft Intermediate School District	21000	Delta; Schoolcraft	www.dsisd.net/
Dickinson–Iron Intermediate School District	22000	Dickinson; Iron	www.diisd.org
Eastern Upper Peninsula Intermediate School District	17000	Chippewa; Luce; Mackinac	www.eupschools.org/
Eaton Intermediate School District	23000	Eaton	www.eatonresa.org
Genesee Intermediate School District	25000	Genesee	www.geneseeisd.org
Gogebic–Ontonagon Intermediate School District	27000	Gogebic; Ontonagon	www.goisd.org
Gratiot–Isabella Regional Education Service District	29000	Gratiot; Isabella	www.giresd.net/
Heritage Southwest Intermediate School District	14000	Cass	www.hsisd.org
Hillsdale Intermediate School District	30000	Hillsdale	hillsdale-isd.org
Huron Intermediate School District	32000	Huron	www.hisd.k12.mi.us
Ingham Intermediate School District	33000	Ingham	inghamisd.org
Ionia Intermediate School District	34000	Ionia	www.ioniaisd.org
Iosco Regional Educational Service Agency	35000	Iosco	www.ioscoresa.net
Jackson Intermediate School District	38000	Jackson	www.jcisd.org
Kalamazoo Regional Educational Service Agency	39000	Kalamazoo	www.kresa.org
Kent Intermediate School District	41000	Kent	www.kentisd.org
Lapeer Intermediate School District	44000	Lapeer	www.lcisd.k12.mi.us
Lenawee Intermediate School District	46000	Lenawee	lisd.us
Livingston Educational Service Agency	47000	Livingston	www.livingstonesa.org
Macomb Intermediate School District	50000	Macomb	www.misd.net
Manistee Intermediate School District	51000	Manistee	www.manistee.org
Marquette–Alger Regional Educational Service Agency	52000	Alger; Marquette	www.maresa.org
Mecosta–Osceola Intermediate School District	54000	Mecosta; Osceola	moisd.org
Menominee Intermediate School District	55000	Menominee	mc-isd.org
Midland County Educational Service Agency	56000	Midland	www.midlandesa.org
Monroe Intermediate School District	58000	Monroe	monroeisd.us
Montcalm Area Intermediate School District	59000	Montcalm	www.maisd.com
Muskegon Area Intermediate School District	61000	Muskegon	www.muskegonisd.org
Newaygo County Regional Educational Service Agency	62000	Newaygo	ncresa.org
Northwest Educational Services	28000	Antrim; Benzie; Grand Traverse; Kalkaska; Leelanau	www.northwested.org
Oakland Schools	63000	Oakland	oakland.k12.mi.us
Ottawa Area Intermediate School District	70000	Ottawa	www.oaisd.org
Saginaw Intermediate School District	73000	Saginaw	www.sisd.cc
Saint Clair County Regional Educational Service Agency	74000	St. Clair	www.sccresa.org
Saint Joseph County Intermediate School District	75000	St. Joseph	www.sjcisd.org
Sanilac Intermediate School District	76000	Sanilac	www.sanilac.k12.mi.us
Shiawassee Regional Educational Service District	78000	Shiawassee	www.sresd.org
State of Michigan	84000	Ingham	www.michigan.gov
Tuscola Intermediate School District	79000	Tuscola	www.tuscolaisd.org
Van Buren Intermediate School District	80000	Van Buren	www.vbisd.org
Washtenaw Intermediate School District	81000	Washtenaw	washtenawisd.org
Wayne County Regional Educational Service Agency	82000	Wayne	www.resa.net
West Shore Educational Service District	53000	Lake; Mason Oceana	www.wsesd.org/
Wexford–Missaukee Intermediate School District	83000	Missaukee; Wexford	www.wmisd.org
