= East Lansing Public Schools =

School district in Michigan

Address
- 501 Burcham Dr. East Lansing, Ingham, Michigan, 48823; United States

District information
- Grades: PreK-12
- Established: 1900
- Superintendent: Dori Leyko
- Schools: 8
- Budget: US$67,938,000 (2022–23 expenditures)
- NCES District ID: 2612600

Students and staff
- Students: 3,726 (2024–2025)
- Teachers: 221.09 FTE (2024–25)
- Staff: 486.25 FTE (2024–2025)
- Student–teacher ratio: 16.85 (2024–25)

Other information
- Website: elps.us

East Lansing Public Schools is a public school district in Ingham County, Michigan. It serves much of East Lansing, portions of Lansing and Haslett, and portions of Lansing Charter Township and Meridian Charter Township. A portion of the district is in Clinton County, where it serves portions of the parts of East Lansing in the county, as well as sections of Bath Charter Township.

== History ==
East Lansing Public Schools district was formed in 1900. In 1901, Central School was built at Grand River and Charles Street, and it received an addition in 1909 designed by architect Edwyn A. Bowd. In 1916, it burned down, on the same night as the same architect's Michigan State University College of Engineering Building burned.

Bowd also designed the replacement school, which opened in 1917 and housed a high school. A dedicated high school was built in 1926 at 819 Abbott Road and opened in May 1927. In 1936, seventh and eighth grade were added to the building. The current high school was built in 1956, at which time the 1926 building became entirely a middle school. It was named Hannah Middle School in 1971 and closed in 1997.

The district is governed by a seven-person Board of Education. Since 1973, the Board has included a student-elected, non-voting student representative from East Lansing High School.

== Schools ==
Schools in East Lansing Public Schools district
School	Address	Notes
East Lansing High School	509 Burcham Dr., East Lansing	Grades 9–12. Built 1956.
MacDonald Middle School	1601 Burcham Dr., East Lansing	Grades 6–8. Built 1968; mascot: Trojan; colors: blue and white
Glencairn Elementary School	939 N Harrison Rd., East Lansing	Grades K–5; mascot: Glencairn Terrier; colors: red and black
Whitehills Elementary School	621 Pebblebrook Ln., East Lansing	Grades K–5; mascot: Wolfie the wolf; colors: blue and white
Donley Elementary School	2961 E. Lake Lansing Rd., East Lansing	Grades K–5; mascot: dolphin
Marble Elementary School	729 N. Hagadorn, East Lansing	Grades K–5; mascot: Muskie the muskrat; colors: blue and white
Robert L Green Elementary School	1811 Pinecrest Dr., East Lansing	Grades K–5; mascot: gator; colors: green and black
Red Cedar Elementary School	1110 Narcissus, East Lansing	Grades K–5; mascot: raccoon; color: red
