= Intermediate school district =

Type of school district in some U.S. states

An intermediate school district, in the United States, is a term used by some states to classify a special agency that operates outside the traditional charter of a school district. The specific role of these agencies varies by state.

== Michigan ==
In Michigan, an intermediate school district (also known as an educational service agency) is a government agency usually organized at the county or multi-county level that assists a local school district in providing programs and services. Those services and programs include teacher education, enhancing education for very young or disenfranchised youth, providing resources for curriculum development, and training in new technologies. They collect data for the Michigan Department of Education, and act as liaisons to the State of Michigan government. An intermediate school district has a board of education chosen by a group of electors with one member from each local school district's board of education. Additionally, they may recommend a merger of school districts to the Michigan State Board of Education.

== Minnesota ==
In Minnesota, an intermediate school district is a special designation applied to a school district formed as a cooperative effort of two or more school districts "offering integrated services for secondary, post-secondary and adult students in the areas of vocational education, special education, and other authorized services."

== See also ==
- List of intermediate school districts in Michigan
- List of school districts in Minnesota
