= Michigan's 103rd House of Representatives district =

American legislative district

Michigan's 103rd State House of Representatives district
Representative
Betsy Coffia; D–Traverse City
- Demographics: 90.2% White; 0.9% Black; 3.4% Hispanic; 0.6% Asian; 0.9% Native American; 0.2% Other; 4% Multiracial
- Population (2024): 94,555

Michigan's 103rd House of Representatives district (also referred to as Michigan's 103rd House district) is a legislative district within the Michigan House of Representatives located in parts of Benzie and Grand Traverse counties, as well as all of Leelanau County. The district was created in 1965, when the Michigan House of Representatives district naming scheme changed from a county-based system to a numerical one.

== List of representatives ==
Representative	Party	Dates	Residence	Notes
Nelson G. Tisdale	Republican	1965–1970	Midland	
Louis K. Cramton	Republican	1971–1972	Midland	
Ralph Ostling	Republican	1973–1992	Roscommon	
Thomas Alley	Democratic	1993–1998	West Branch	
Dale Sheltrown	Democratic	1999–2004	Gladwin	Lived in West Branch until around 2003.
Joel Sheltrown	Democratic	2005–2010	West Branch	
Bruce Rendon	Republican	2011–2016	Lake City	
Daire Rendon	Republican	2017–2022	Lake City	
Betsy Coffia	Democratic	2023–present	Traverse City	

== Recent elections ==
=== 2020s ===
2026 Michigan House of Representatives election
Party	Candidate	Votes	%
Democratic	Betsy Coffia (incumbent)	32,791	57.18
Republican	Edwin B. Dean	23,773	41.45
Libertarian	Michael Gorbe	787	1.37
Total votes		57,351	100
Democratic hold			

2022 Michigan House of Representatives election
Party	Candidate	Votes	%
Democratic	Betsy Coffia	27,805	49.84
Republican	Jack O'Malley	27,040	48.47
Libertarian	Courtney Evans	945	1.69
Total votes		55,790	100
Democratic gain from Republican			

2020 Michigan House of Representatives election
Party	Candidate	Votes	%
Republican	Daire Rendon	36,935	71.02
Democratic	Zach Larson	15,073	28.98
Total votes		52,008	100
Republican hold			

2018 Michigan House of Representatives election
Party	Candidate	Votes	%
Republican	Daire Rendon	25,966	64.71
Democratic	Tim Schaiberger	14,161	35.29
Total votes		40,127	100
Republican hold			

2016 Michigan House of Representatives election
Party	Candidate	Votes	%
Republican	Daire Rendon	25,988	58.30%
Democratic	Jordan Stancil	18,589	41.70%
Total votes		44,577	100.00%
Republican hold			

2014 Michigan House of Representatives election
Party	Candidate	Votes	%
Republican	Bruce Rendon	18,257	60.23
Democratic	James Cromwell	10,396	34.30
Independent	Brad Richards	1,658	5.47
Total votes		30,311	100.0
Republican hold			

2012 Michigan House of Representatives election
Party	Candidate	Votes	%
Republican	Bruce Rendon	23,308	52.80
Democratic	Lon Johnson	20,832	47.20
Total votes		44,140	100.0
Republican hold			

2010 Michigan House of Representatives election
Party	Candidate	Votes	%
Republican	Bruce Rendon	19,930	62.5
Democratic	Van Sheltrown	11,958	37.5
Total votes		31,888	100.0
Republican gain from Democratic			

2008 Michigan House of Representatives election
Party	Candidate	Votes	%
Democratic	Joel Sheltrown	29,927	66.61
Republican	Dave Ryan	15,003	33.39
Total votes		44,930	100.0
Democratic hold			

== Historical district boundaries ==
Map	Description	Apportionment Plan	Notes
	Crawford County; Gladwin County; Midland County (part); Homer Township; Hope Township; Ingersoll Township; Jerome Township; Larkin Township; Lincoln Township; Midland; Midland Township; Mills Township; Mount Haley Township; Missaukee County (part); Aetna Township; Bloomfield Township; Butterfield Township; Caldwell Township; Clam Union Township; Enterprise Township; Forest Township; Holland Township; Lake City; Lake Township; Norwich Township; Pioneer Township; Reeder Township; Riverside Township; West Branch Township; Roscommon County	1964 Apportionment Plan	
	Antrim County; Warner Township; Charlevoix County (part); Excluding; Boyne City; Boyne Valley Township; Chandler Township; Evangeline Township; Hudson Township; Melrose Township; Clare County; Excluding; Clare; Sheridan Township; Crawford County; Grand Traverse County (part); Whitewater Township; Isabella County; Gilmore Township; Kalkaska County; Missaukee County; Osceola County; Excluding; Evart Township; Roscommon County (part); Excluding; Au Sable Township; Backus Township; Nester Township	1972 Apportionment Plan	
	Antrim County; Charlevoix County; Crawford County; Oscoda County; Otsego County; Roscommon County	1982 Apportionment Plan	
	Arenac County; Gladwin County; Iosco County; Roscommon County	1992 Apportionment Plan	
	Iosco County; Missaukee County; Ogemaw County; Roscommon County	2001 Apportionment Plan	
	Crawford County; Kalkaska County; Missaukee County; Ogemaw County; Roscommon County	2011 Apportionment Plan	
