= Merritt, Michigan =

- Unincorporated community
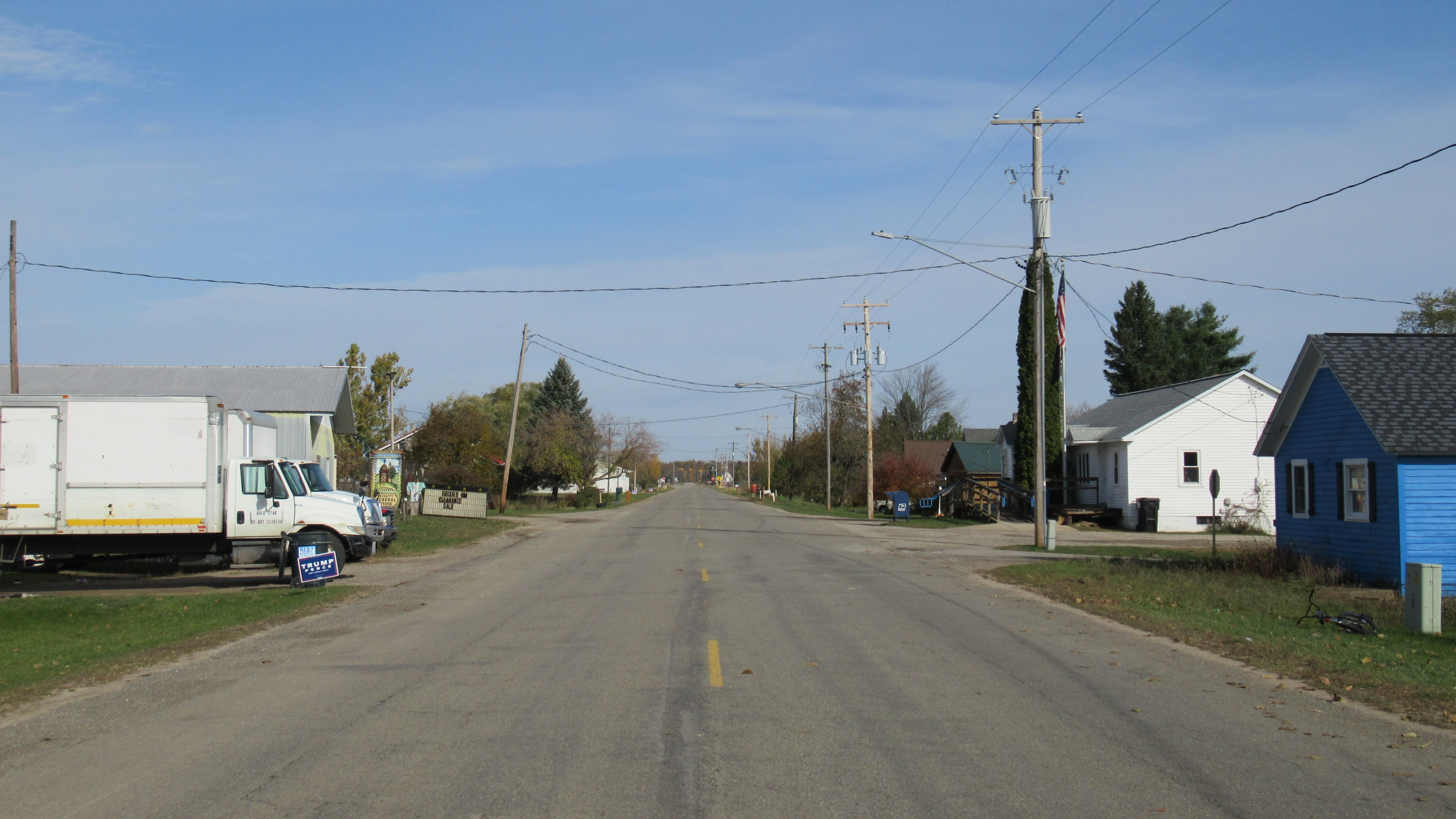
- Looking north along Merritt Road toward M-55

- Location within the state of Michigan Location within the United States
- Coordinates: 44°19′47″N 84°56′41″W
- Country: United States
- State: Michigan
- County: Missaukee
- Townships: Butterfield and Enterprise
- Settled: 1901
- Elevation: 1,155 ft (352 m)
- Time zone: UTC-5 (Eastern (EST))
  - Summer (DST): UTC-4 (EDT)
- ZIP code(s): 49667
- Area code: 231
- GNIS feature ID: 632136

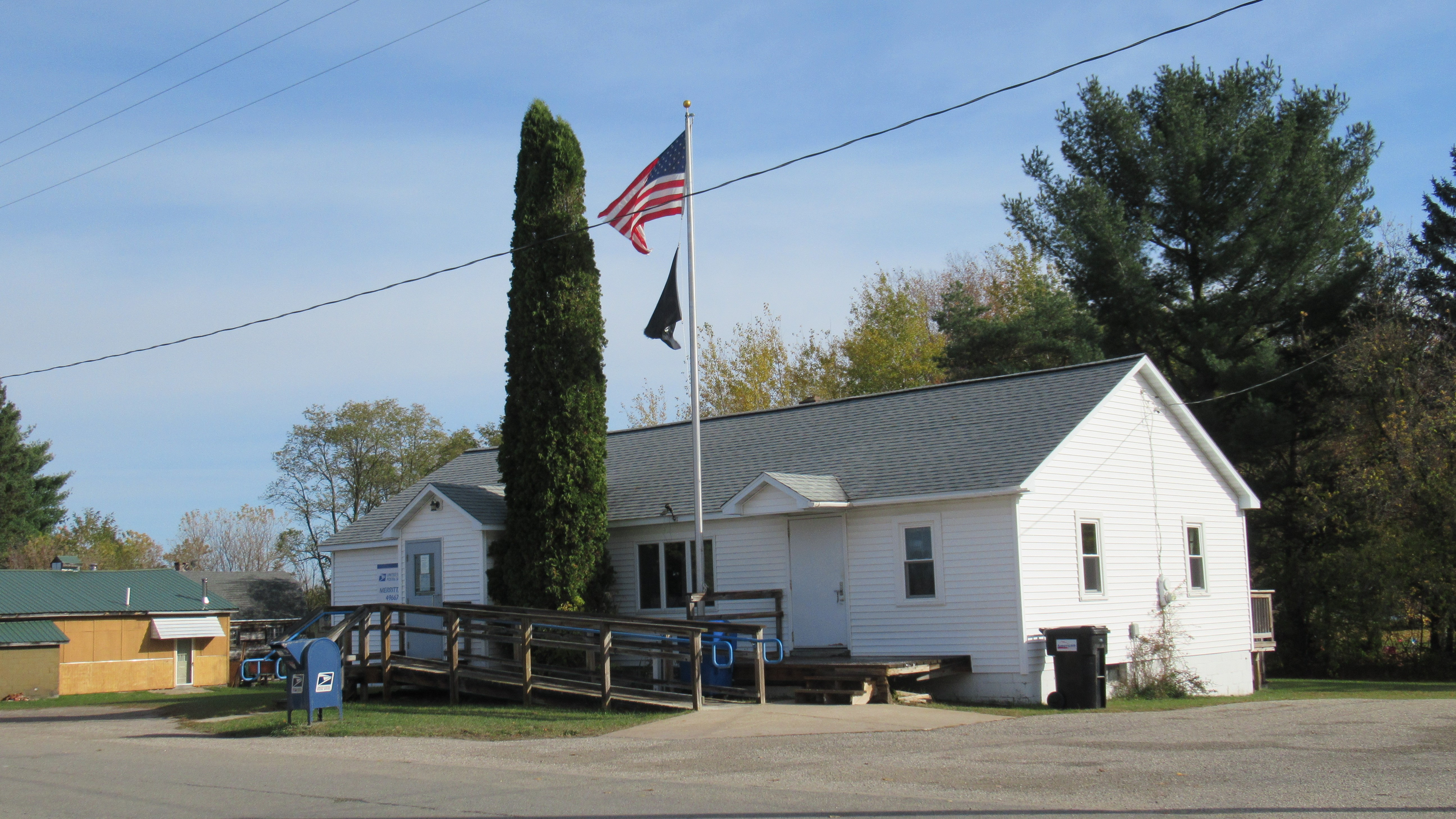
U.S. Post Office in Merritt

Merritt is an unincorporated community in Missaukee County in the U.S. state of Michigan. The community is centered between Butterfield Township to the south and Enterprise Township to the north. As an unincorporated community, Merritt has no legally defined boundaries or population statistics of its own but does have its own post office with the 49667 ZIP Code.

== Geography ==
The community is centered along Merritt Road and M-55 in eastern Missaukee County about 15 miles (24.1 km) east of Lake City.

The Merritt post office currently uses the 49667 ZIP Code, which covers most of the eastern portion of Missaukee County, including the northern portion of Butterfield Township and the southern portion of Enterprise Township. The ZIP Code also includes a very small portion of Aetna Township to the west, as well as Lake Township in Roscommon County to the east.

The community is surrounded by portions of the Cadillac Forest Management Unit of Pere Marquette State Forest and is located about 25 miles (40.2 km) east of the city of Cadillac. Portions of the Muskegon River flow near Merritt, and other notable places within the area include Dead Stream Flooding State Wildlife Management Area, Merritt Speedway, and the Reedsburg Dam.

Merritt is served by two separate school districts. Residents in the western portion of the community may attend Lake City Area School District, while the majority of residents to the east may attend Houghton Lake Community School.

== History ==
In 1901, Charles and Elizabeth Merritt traveled from Belleville near Detroit on a covered wagon trip that took three weeks. They settled in the rural area, and other families soon joined them. In 1908, the community was given the name Merritt for the first time when a railway was opened through the area. The area become popular for its abundant supply of lumber. Farming soon became a dominant industry in the area. A school district was established in 1920, and the District No. 3 of Butterfield built a high school in Merritt in 1936. A fire department was established in Merritt in 1955. In 1993, a new fire station was built along M-55.

M-74 was a formerly designated state highway that existed from 1919 to 1939 near Merritt. The highway was located just northeast of the center of the community. After being decommissioned, it continues to exist as a local roadway called North Star Road, which connects Merritt to the community of Pioneer.

The area received its first post office on November 22, 1910 with merchant Charles P. Sherman as the first postmaster. The post office remains in operation and is located at 329 South Merritt Road. The post office has been in its present location since 1956.

== Notable people ==
- Burt Reynolds, actor, director, and producer who lived part of his childhood in Merritt
