= Dead Stream Flooding State Wildlife Management Area =

Protected wildlife area in Michigan, United States

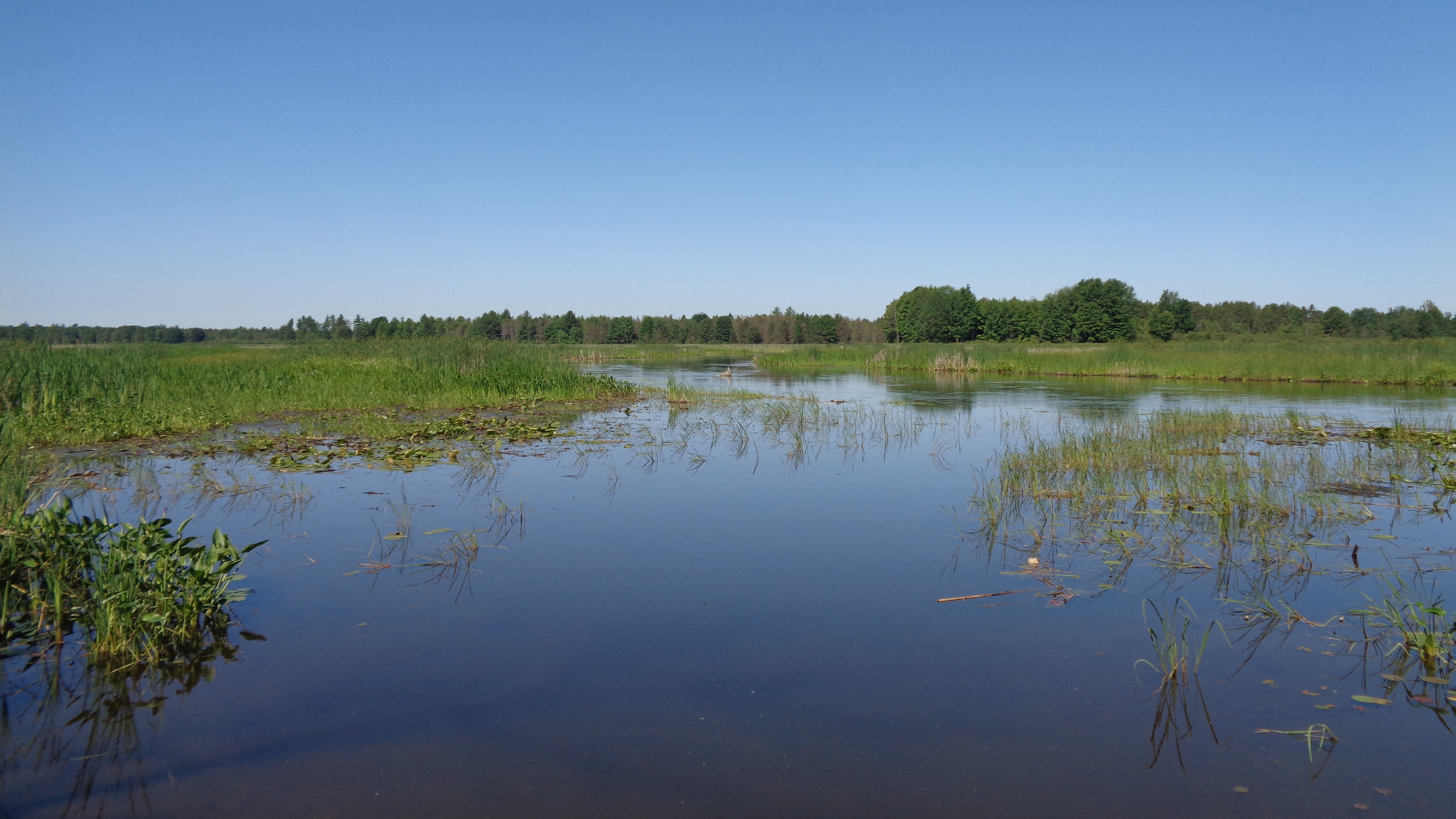
- View from N. Michelson Road in July 2019

- Location within Michigan Location within the United States
- Location: Muskegon River; Enterprise Township and Lake Township, Michigan
- Nearest city: Lake City, Michigan
- Coordinates: 44°22′46″N 84°50′41″W
- Area: 1,024 acres (4.14 km^{2})
- Elevation: 1,142 feet (348 m)
- Governing body: Michigan Department of Natural Resources

The Dead Stream Flooding State Wildlife Management Area is a protected wildlife area located in the U.S. state of Michigan. The wildlife management area centers along the Muskegon River about 2 miles (3.2 km) from its source at Houghton Lake. It incorporates rural areas in Enterprise Township within Missaukee County and Lake Township within Roscommon County for an approximate total area of 1,024 acres (4.14 km^{2}). It is controlled and maintained by the Michigan Department of Natural Resources.

The wildlife management area owes its creation to the Reedsburg Dam, which was constructed in 1940 along the Muskegon River to alleviate flooding from Houghton Lake. The resulting reservoir became known as the Dead Stream Flooding (or Dead Stream Swamp) at a fluctuating size of approximately 540 acres (2.19 km^{2}).

== Location ==
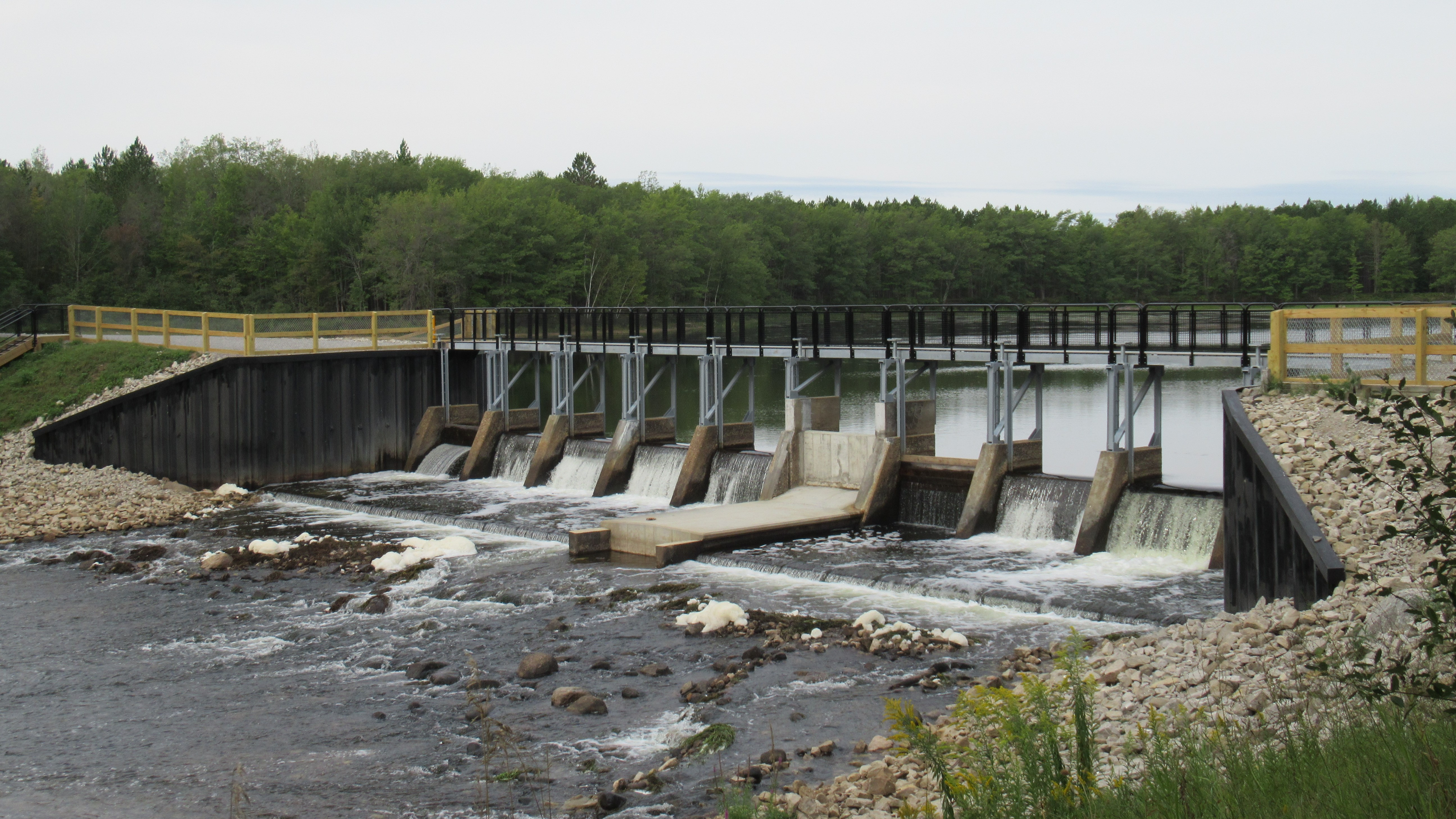
Completed reconstruction of the Reedsburg Dam in September 2020

The area's headquarters are located at the Houghton Lake DNR Wildlife Office at 8717 North Roscommon Road (M-18) in the nearby village of Roscommon. The wildlife management area itself is mostly accessible from U.S. Route 127 exit 194 (M-55) and County Road 300, and the overall area is sparsely populated. Other nearby sizable communities are Houghton Lake just to the southeast and Lake City about 20 miles (32 km) west.

The unconnected Houghton Lake Flats Flooding State Wildlife Management Area is just to the east, and a number of other protected areas are within close proximity, including North Higgins Lake State Park, South Higgins Lake State Park, Hartwick Pines State Park, Houghton Lake State Wildlife Research Area, Bear Creek Flooding State Wildlife Management Area, Backus Creek State Game Area, and Denton Creek Flooding State Wildlife Management Area.

The forests surrounding the Dead Stream Flooding State Wildlife Management Area are also protected as state forest land managed by the Michigan Department of Natural Resources in the Au Sable State Forest and Pere Marquette State Forest.

== Activities ==
The area is popular among campers, tourists, fishermen, and hunters. Common fish within the waters include pumpkinseed, bluegill, small and largemouth bass, native crayfish, northern pike, yellow perch, and bowfin. There are ample shore fishing locations and two public boating access points. The Dead Stream Flooding is mostly shallow and contains numerous underwater obstacles that make larger motorized vessels discouraged. The surrounding woodlands are open to seasonal waterfowl, turkey, and deer hunting. Other popular activities include bird watching, geocaching, photography, and canoeing/kayaking. Rustic camping is available at the Reedsburg Dam State Forest Campground on the northeast side of the dam. The campground is operated by the nearby North Higgins Lake State Park.

== Recent history ==
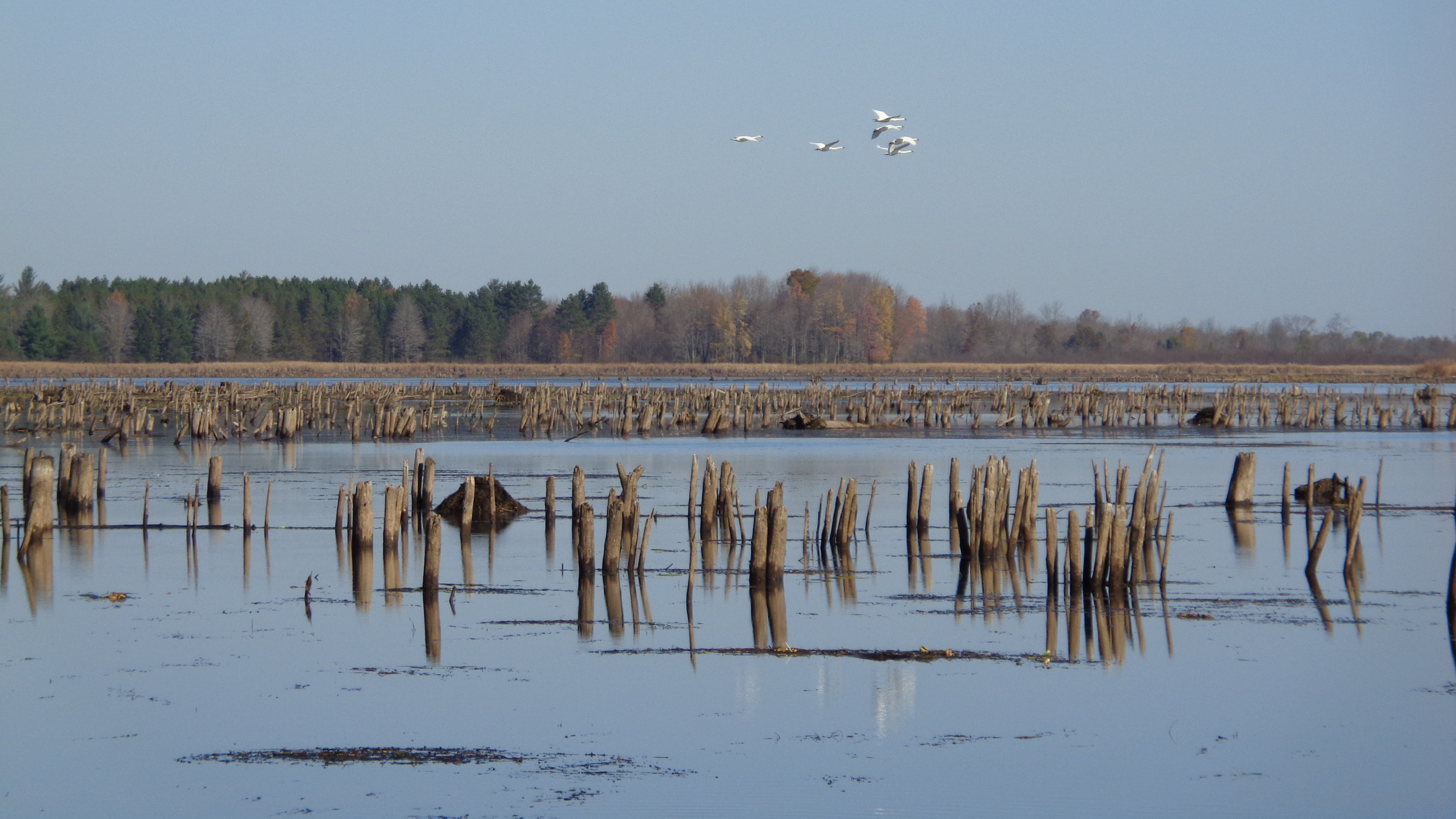
The draining reservoir in October 2018

Beginning in August 2018, the Reedsburg Dam underwent major reconstruction that lasted for almost two years. The Dead Stream Flooding reservoir was significantly lowered to allow for only the original flow of the Muskegon River. The construction was necessary to repair and rebuild the nearly 80-year-old earthen dike and concrete and steel structures of the dam. During the project, portions of the wetlands of the Dead Stream Flooding State Wildlife Management Area were temporarily dried up; most of the lower water levels took place near the dam and not further upstream along the Muskegon River. When the construction project was completed, the reservoir was projected to return to its normal levels by the end of summer 2020.

However, due to the COVID-19 pandemic in Michigan, construction work on the dam was delayed. While more than 90% of the dam project was completed prior to the delay, water levels were expected to return to normal levels by the end of 2020. The construction project itself was completed by September 2020, and water levels were slowly raised to their original level.
