= Reedsburg Dam =

Dam in Michigan, United States

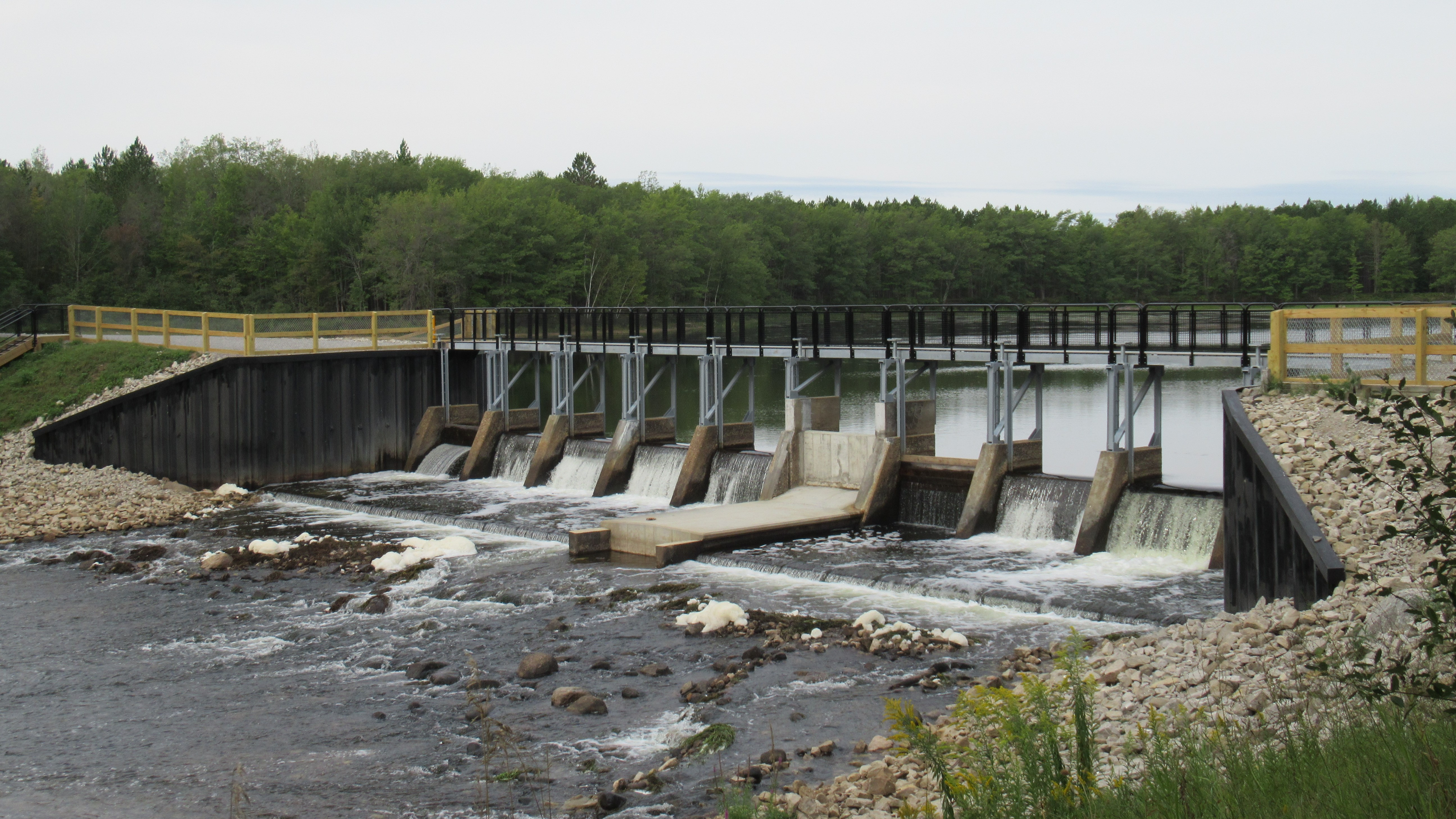
- The Reedsburg Dam in September 2020

- Location within the state of Michigan
- Country: United States
- Location: Enterprise Township; Missaukee County, Michigan
- Coordinates: 44°21′22″N 84°51′33″W
- Purpose: Flood control
- Status: Operational
- Opening date: 1940; 86 years ago
- Built by: Civilian Conservation Corps

Dam and spillways
- Type of dam: Barrage
- Impounds: Muskegon River

Reservoir
- Creates: Dead Stream Flooding
- Total capacity: 540 acres (219 ha)

The Reedsburg Dam is a non-hydroelectric barrage dam crossing the Muskegon River in eastern Missaukee County in the U.S. state of Michigan. Located in rural Enterprise Township, the dam was constructed in 1940 by the Civilian Conservation Corps to alleviate flooding from Houghton Lake, which is the source of the Muskegon River approximately 6 miles (9.7 km) upstream.

The resulting reservoir is known as the Dead Stream Flooding, and the area is incorporated into the Dead Stream Flooding State Wildlife Management Area, which extends east into neighboring Roscommon County. The Reedsburg Dam is the smallest and newest of the four remaining dams along the Muskegon River, which includes the Croton Dam, Hardy Dam, and Rogers Dam much further downstream.

== Activities ==
The Reedsburg Dam is located along County Road 300 about 5 miles (8.0 km) northwest of the community of Houghton Lake—3 miles (4.8 km) west of U.S. Route 127 and 1.5 miles (2.4 km) north of M-55. The nearest incorporated city is Lake City about 18 miles (29.0 km) west along M-55.

Common fauna in the Muskegon River and Dead Stream Flooding includes bluegill, pumpkinseed, small and largemouth bass, walleye, yellow perch, native crayfish, northern pike, and bowfin (colloquially referred to as "dogfish"). The surrounding area is open to seasonal waterfowl, turkey, and deer hunting. The footpath across the dam is commonly used by hunters to access the more remote wilderness trails—some of which belonged to the long-defunct and removed railway lines of the Missaukee Branch of the Pennsylvania Railroad.

Other popular activities include bird watching, geocaching, photography, and canoeing/kayaking. Rustic camping is available at the adjacent Reedsburg Dam State Forest Campground on the northeast side of the dam, which is operated by the nearby North Higgins Lake State Park. The campground contains a public boat launch, but larger boats are discouraged due to the shallowness and underwater hazards within the Dead Stream Flooding.

== Recent history ==
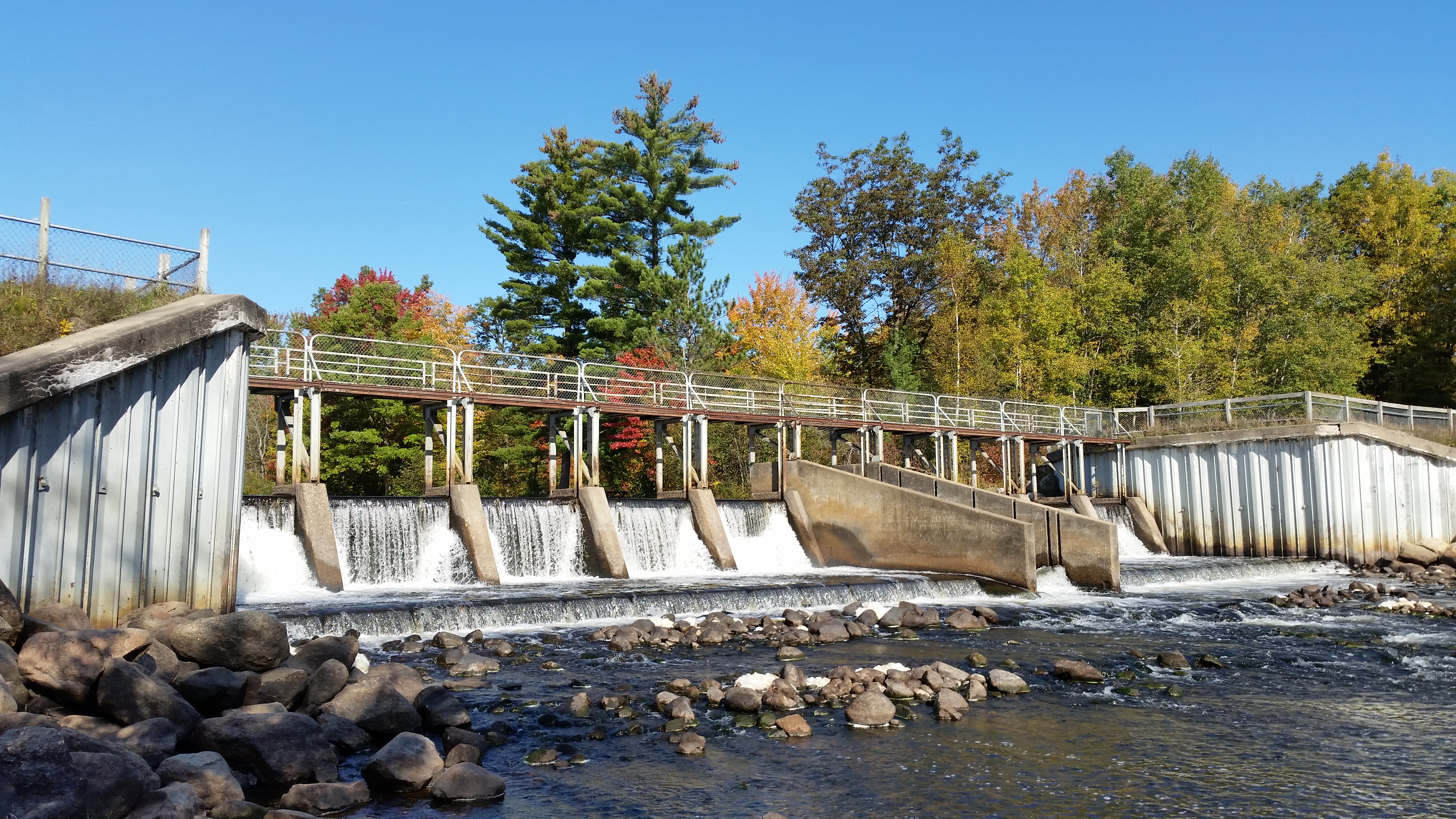
The original Reedsburg Dam (shown here in 2017) was rebuilt in 2019–2020

Beginning in August 2018, the dam underwent major reconstruction that continued for over one year. The construction was necessary to repair and rebuild the nearly 80-year-old earthen dike and concrete and steel structures. During the project, the Dead Stream Flooding was slowly drained and eventually allowed for only the regular flow of the Muskegon River. In addition, a new steel walkway and staircase replaced the older wooden structures, and a large number of rocks were trucked in to strengthen the dike along the reservoir and immediate downstream embankments.

Due to the COVID-19 pandemic in Michigan in early 2020, the finishing steps on the construction project were delayed. According to the Michigan Department of Natural Resources, more than 90% of the project was complete before government shutdowns were implemented by Governor Gretchen Whitmer. While the reservoir saw a significant increase in water levels after the dam was rebuilt, the pre-construction water level was originally slated to return to normal by summertime. The dam reconstruction project was completed in September 2020, but water levels within the reservoir were still noticeably lower for quite some time.

The campground remained open throughout the project. The dock at the public boat launch, which no longer reached the lowering water level, was moved out of place. The launch itself remains open and usable, although the water levels throughout the reservoir decreased significantly. With the completion of the project, water levels were raised very slowly.

== Images ==
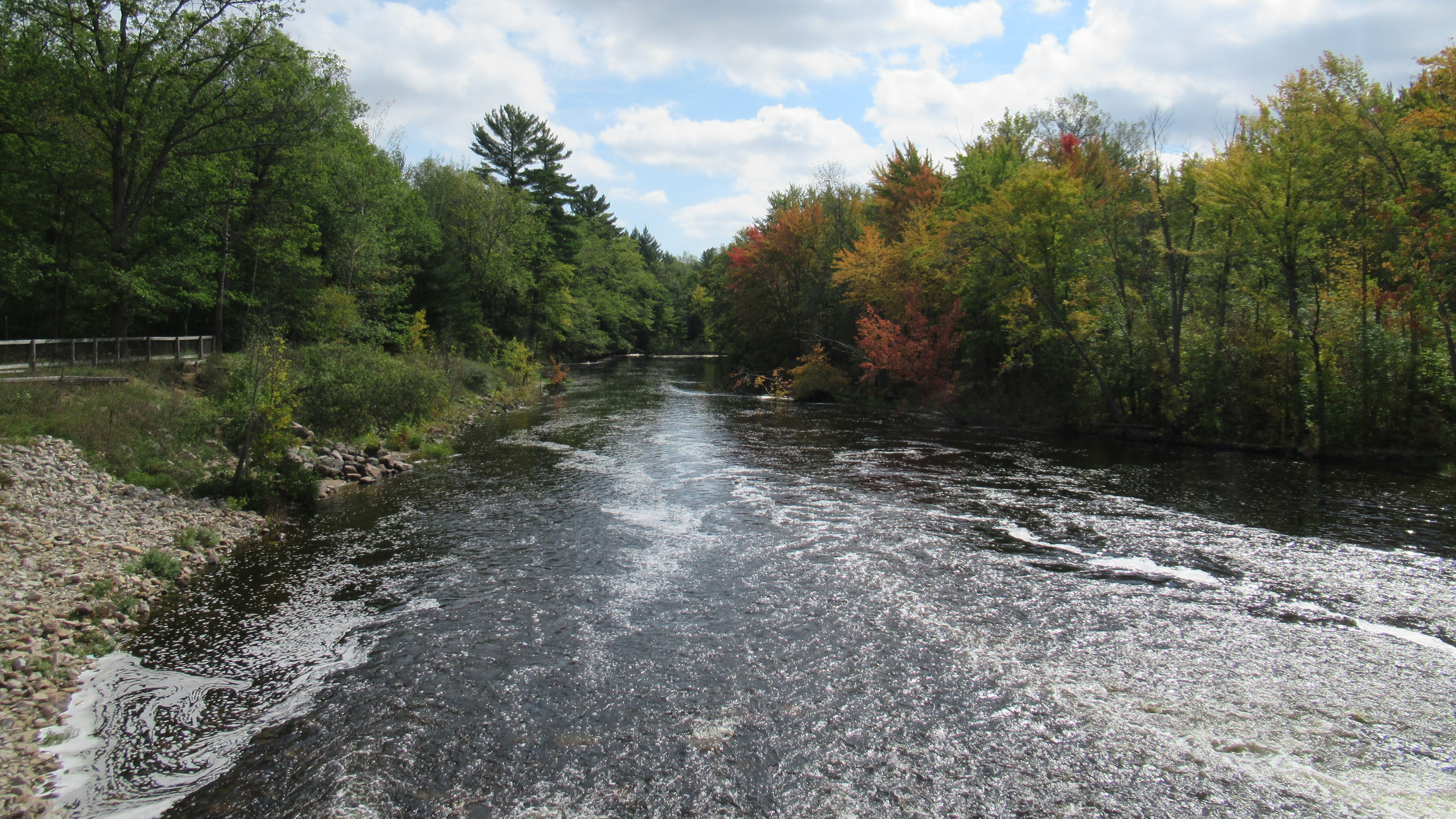
Downstream Muskegon River

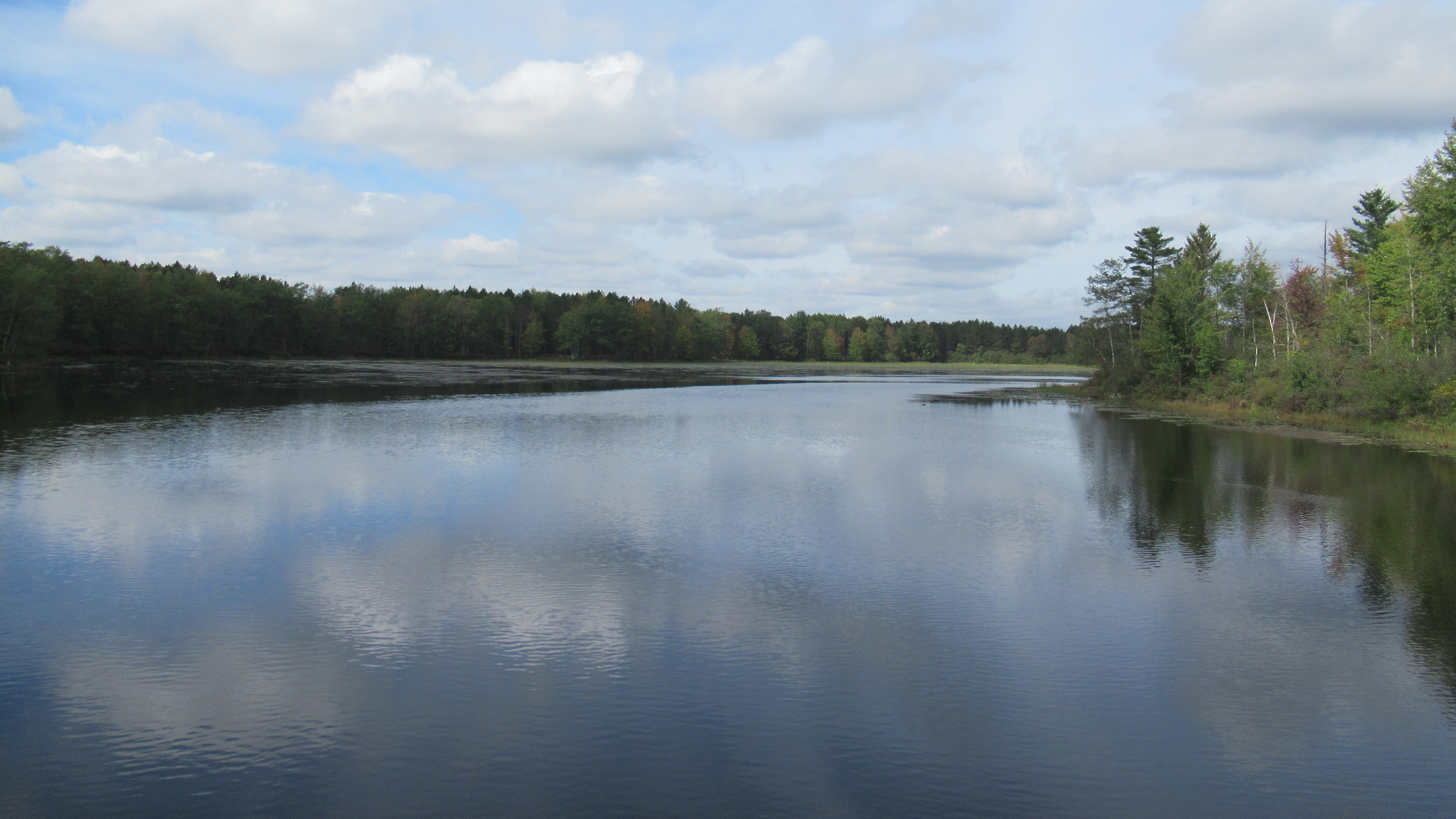
Dead Stream Flooding

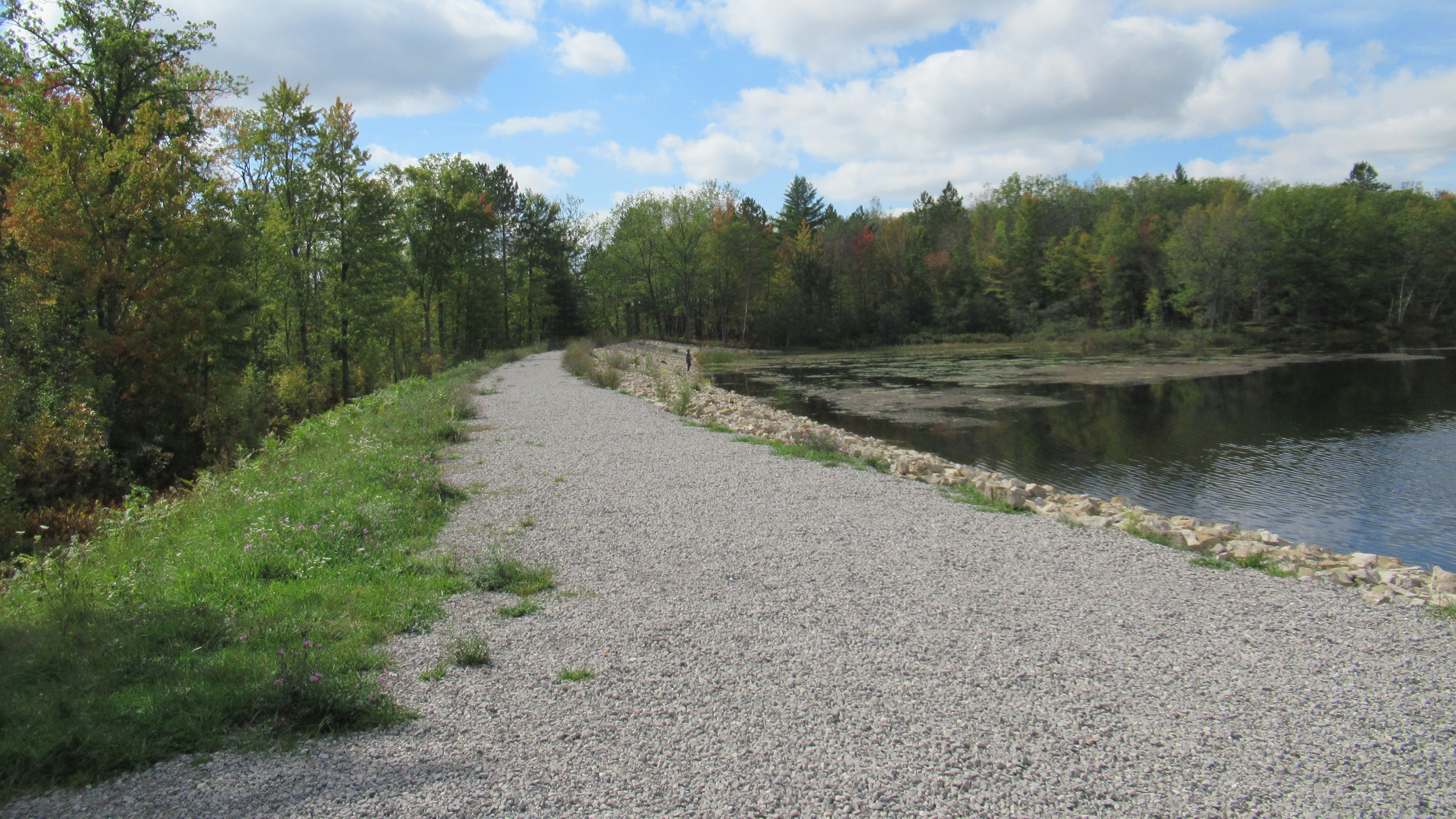
Gravel and earthen embankment
