= Jennings, Michigan =

- Census-designated place (CDP) & unincorporated community
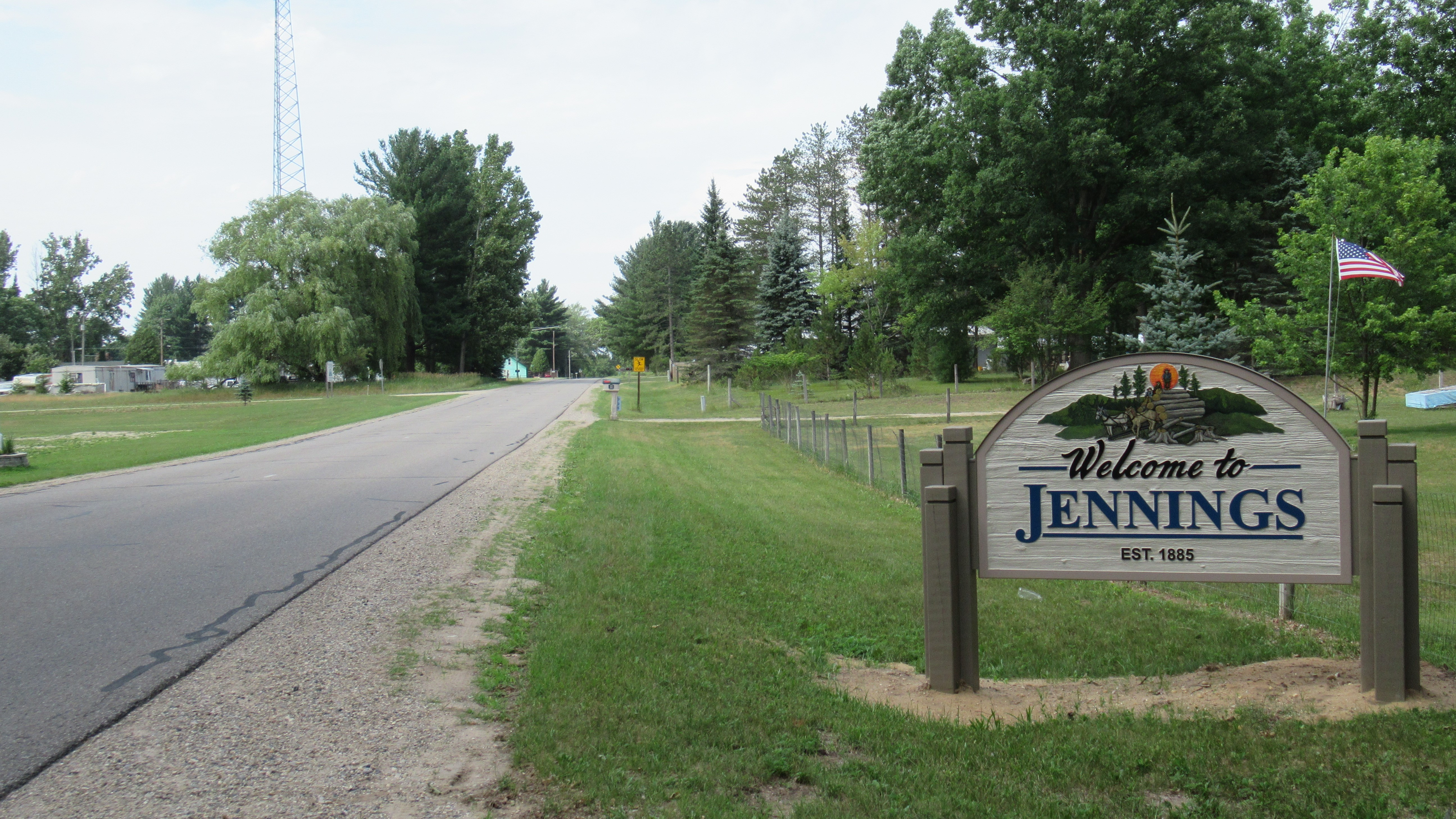
- Welcome sign along S. La Chance Road

- Location within Missaukee County

- Location within the state of Michigan Location within the United States
- Coordinates: 44°19′58″N 85°17′53″W
- Country: United States
- State: Michigan
- County: Missaukee
- Townships: Caldwell and Lake
- Established: 1885

Area
  - Total: 0.76 sq mi (1.97 km^{2})
  - Land: 0.76 sq mi (1.97 km^{2})
  - Water: 0 sq mi (0.00 km^{2})
- Elevation: 1,306 ft (398 m)

Population (2020)
  - Total: 229
  - Density: 301.32/sq mi (116.34/km^{2})
- Time zone: UTC-5 (Eastern (EST))
  - Summer (DST): UTC-4 (EDT)
- ZIP code(s): 49651 (Lake City)
- Area code: 231
- GNIS feature ID: 629259
- FIPS Code: 26-41720

Jennings is an unincorporated community and census-designated place (CDP) in Missaukee County in the U.S. state of Michigan. The population was 229 at the 2020 census, down from 264 in 2010. The CDP is mostly located in Lake Township and a small portion extends north into Caldwell Township.

== History ==
Jennings was a lumbering center founded by Austin and William Mitchell, who named it for William Jennings Bryan. A post office opened on March 8, 1883, with J. Frank Schryer as the first postmaster. It was discontinued on July 31, 1956. Jennings was a terminus of the Missaukee spur of the Grand Rapids and Indiana Railroad, with a junction on the main line named Round Lake.

The community of Jennings was listed as a newly organized census-designated place for the 2010 census, giving it officially defined boundaries and population statistics.

== Geography ==
Jennings is in western Missaukee County and bordered to the east by Crooked Lake. It is 7 miles (11 km) by road west of Lake City, the county seat and 10 miles (16 km) northeast of Cadillac. According to the U.S. Census Bureau, the Jennings CDP is an area of 0.76 square miles (1.97 km^{2}), all land.

The census-designated place is defined as being within Caldwell and Lake townships. All 264 residents and 0.67 square miles (1.74 km^{2}) of land are within Lake Township, while no residents and 0.09 square miles (0.23 km^{2}) of land are in Caldwell Township to the north.

== Demographics ==
Historical population
Census	Pop.	Note	%±
2010	264		—
2020	229		−13.3%
U.S. Decennial Census
