= Lake Missaukee =

Lake in the state of Michigan, United States

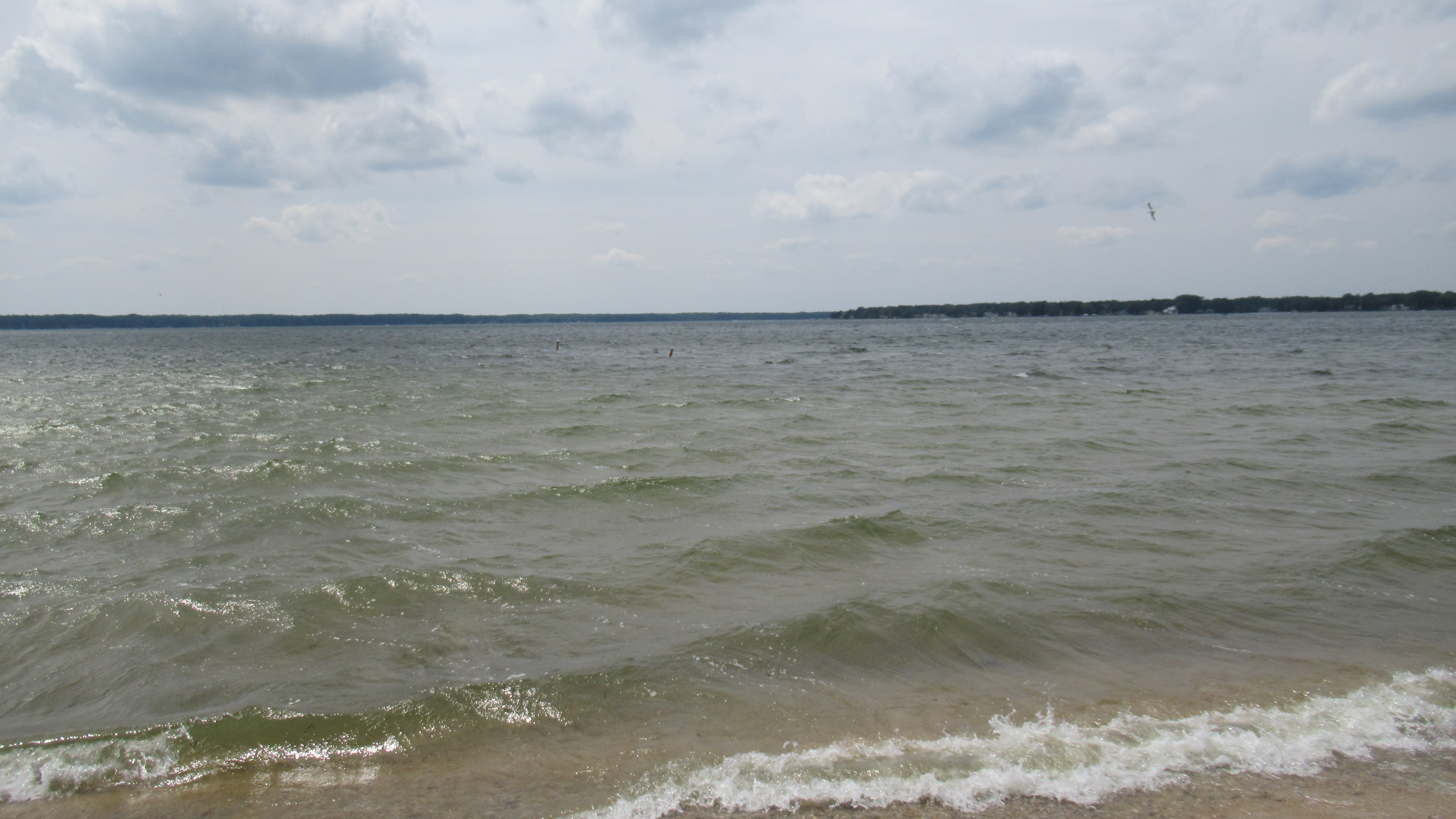
- View from Miltner Park in Lake City

- Location within the state of Michigan
- Location: Missaukee County, Michigan
- Coordinates: 44°19′23″N 85°14′15″W
- Type: Glacial lake
- Primary inflows: groundwater and rainfall
- Primary outflows: Mosquito Creek to Clam River
- Basin countries: United States
- Surface area: 1,880 acres (760 ha)
- Max. depth: 27 ft (8.2 m)
- Surface elevation: 1,237 ft (377 m)
- Settlements: Caldwell Township; Lake City; Lake Township

Lake Missaukee is a freshwater lake located in Missaukee County in the U.S. state of Michigan. The lake is mostly surrounded by Lake Township, while bordering Lake City to the east and a very small portion extending north into Caldwell Township.

== Geology ==
Lake Missaukee is classified as a glacial lake, and it has its origins about 11,000 years ago at the end of the Last Glacial Period. The lake has a surface area of approximately 1,880 acres (760 ha) and a maximum depth of 27 feet (8.2 m). Most of the lake has a depth of less than 15 feet (4.6 m). The lake has a surface elevation of 1,237 feet (377 m) and is close to several other lakes, including Crooked Lake and Sapphire Lake, as well as numerous smaller lakes.

It is the largest lake in Missaukee County and is considered part of the Muskegon River watershed. Because Lake Missaukee sits at a relatively high elevation, the lake has a very small watershed of only 1,775 acres (718 ha), which is smaller than the lake itself. The lake has no primary outflow, but water levels are controlled with drainage into the small Mosquito Creek. The creek eventually flows into the Clam River, which leads into the Muskegon River to Lake Michigan.

== Activities ==
The shores of the lake were first inhabited by European settlers as early as the late 1860s, and logging was a prominent industry until the early 1900s. The lake was used to float logs to the numerous sawmills and other factories surrounding the lake. None of these industries presently exist along the lake, although debris remnants of the past logging industry can still be found in the lake.

Lake Missaukee is easily accessible, with the city of Lake City to the east. M-55/M-66 runs along the eastern coastline through Lake City. The larger city of Cadillac is located 15 minutes west.

The lake serves as a recreational area for fishing, swimming, and boating, and there are numerous parks and beaches surrounding the lake. There are several public access boat launches, including one maintained by the Michigan Department of Natural Resources at the northern end of the lake at Missaukee County Park.

=== Fishing ===
Popular among fishermen, common fish include bluegill, black crappie, brown bullhead, large and smallmouth bass, pumpkinseed, northern pike, walleye, and yellow perch. There are also rare sightings of common carp. The Michigan Department of Natural Resources stocks walleye in the lake, and the numerous fish populations are routinely monitored. Lake Missaukee contains numerous listings on the state's Master Angler Entries, in which the largest recorded fish caught was a northern pike at 19.67 pounds (8.92 kg) and 40 inches (101.6 cm) long. Invasive species within the lake include Eurasian milfoil and zebra mussels.
