= Dale Sheltrown =

American politician

Member of the Michigan House of Representatives from the 103rd district
- In office January 1, 1999 – December 31, 2004
- Preceded by: Thomas Alley
- Succeeded by: Joel Sheltrown

Member of the Ogemaw County Board of Commissioners
- In office 1988–1998
- In office 1974–1982

Personal details
- Born: November 5, 1940 (age 85)
- Party: Democratic
- Spouse: Lori
- Education: Michigan State University

Dale Sheltrown is a Democratic politician from Michigan who served in the Michigan House of Representatives from 1999 to 2004, when he was succeeded by his brother Joel Sheltrown.

Sheltrown's father, Ed, was a township supervisor for 35 years, and two of his five siblings are also elected officials or public servants. He operated a farm from 1965 to 1974, and, after two years working in sales at a John Deere dealership, Sheltrown began a career in real estate.
