= Joel Sheltrown =

American politician

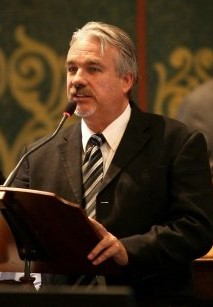

Member of the Michigan House of Representatives from the 103rd district
- In office January 1, 2005 – December 31, 2010
- Preceded by: Dale Sheltrown
- Succeeded by: Bruce Rendon

Personal details
- Born: 1947 (age 78–79) West Branch, Michigan
- Party: Democratic
- Spouse: Teresa Sheltrown
- Profession: Small-business owner, musician

Joel Sheltrown (born 1947) is an American politician from the state of Michigan. A Democrat, he served in the Michigan House of Representatives, representing the 103rd district, which at the time included all of Iosco, Missaukee, Ogemaw, and Roscommon counties. He was elected on November 2, 2004 to replace outgoing Rep. Dale Sheltrown, his brother. He left office in 2010 due to term limits and is now a member of the national advisory board of Democrats for Life of America.

== Biography ==
Joel Sheltrown is a lifelong resident of northern Michigan's Ogemaw County. He graduated from West Branch High School in 1965 and then attended Western Michigan University and Kirtland Community College.

In 1966, Joel Sheltrown enlisted in the United States Navy and was sent to Vietnam. He achieved the rank of 2nd Class Petty Officer as a Communications Technician with a Top Secret Crypto Clearance. He received an honorable discharge in 1970 following two tours in Viet Nam, and service in the Philippines and West Germany.

Following his wartime military service overseas, Joel Sheltrown returned to West Branch where he managed his father's John Deere dealership. In 1978, he purchased a propane dealership in West Branch. He continued in that business until being elected to the Michigan House of Representatives. Joel Sheltrown is married to Teresa Sheltrown. They have three children: Alison, Nick and Don and two grandchildren.

== Political career ==
Following the traditions of his politically active family from an early age, Joel Sheltrown served as an Ogemaw Township Trustee from 1978–1988 and as the Ogemaw Township Supervisor from 2000–2004. He has also served as the vice president of the Ogemaw County chapter of the Michigan Townships Association.

Sheltrown was elected from the 103rd House District to the Michigan House of Representatives in 2004, and subsequently re-elected in 2006 and 2008. Over the three elections, Sheltrown performed 15 points above the Democratic Party base in the 103rd House District. He is the only Democratic legislative candidate in Michigan history to win a majority of votes in Missaukee County, the second most Republican county in the state.

As a member of the Democratic majority in the Michigan House of Representatives, Sheltrown was appointed to chair the House Tourism, Outdoor Recreation and Natural Resources Committee in 2007 and re-appointed in 2009. Sheltrown focused the committee's attention on economic development by increasing funding for promotion of Michigan's tourism industry through the award winning Pure Michigan campaign and by supporting broader recreational opportunity and access. Joel Sheltrown was the primary sponsor of a new state law allowing All-terrain vehicles to access county roads. He organized a hunters' coalition that won broader inclusion of crossbows in the archery deer hunting season.

Joel Sheltrown is a centrist Democrat. He takes traditionally conservative stands on constitutional issues such as abortion, the second amendment, personal freedoms and parental rights. Joel Sheltrown is a life member of the National Rifle Association. He is a supporter of the labor movement, public education, and a progressive tax structure. He has been an advocate of a hybrid economic model pursuing both an active state role in job creation and job security and a passive role through the elimination of many regulations that hinder business growth.

Sheltrown founded Northeast Michigan Future, a non-profit economic development advocacy coalition of private sector and public sector partners serving 14 counties in Northeast Michigan from 2009 until 2011. Through his legislative efforts and his guidance of NEMF, he secured a 5 million dollar grant from the State of Michigan. The grant was the major financial piece used for construction of a super hangar used to repair and rebuild wide body aircraft in Oscoda, Michigan. The construction of the hangar resulted in significant numbers of aircraft maintenance jobs previously outsourced to Indonesia and Singapore, to be returned to the United States creating 300 high wage jobs in the area.

== Post-legislative career ==
In February 2011, after leaving the House, Sheltrown became Vice President of Governmental Affairs of Elio Motors. He is responsible for any state or federal statutes or regulations affecting the company and any of its suppliers. He provides language and legislative guidance to legislators and regulatory agencies in numerous states. He also lobbies for the elimination of helmet and motorcycle endorsement requirements.
