= Butterfield Township, Michigan =

- Civil township
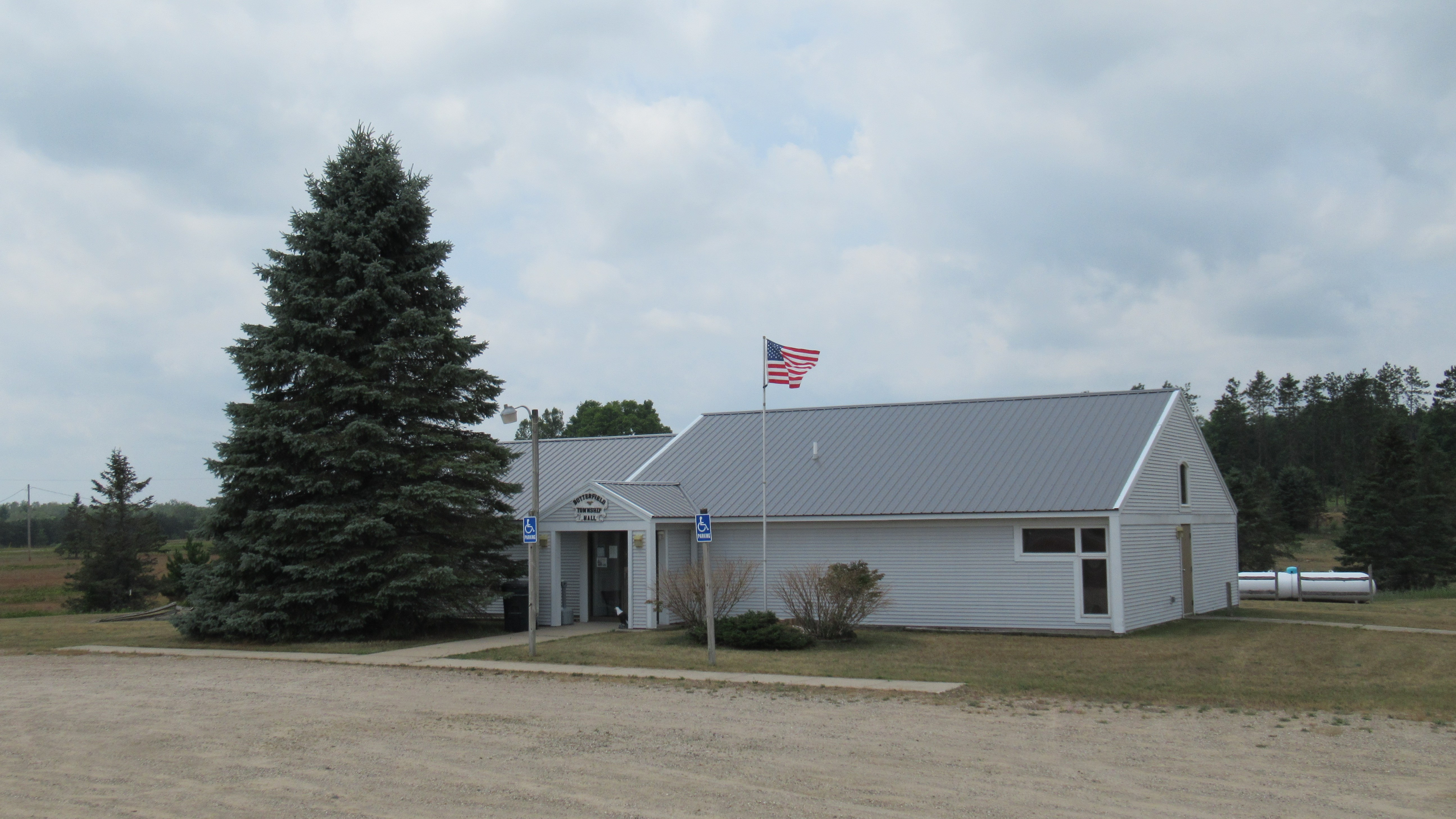
- Butterfield Township Hall

- Location within Missaukee County

- Location within the state of Michigan Location within the United States
- Coordinates: 44°17′53″N 84°55′14″W
- Country: United States
- State: Michigan
- County: Missaukee
- Established: 1891

Government
  - Supervisor: Mike Rockey
  - Clerk: Marilyn Myers

Area
  - Total: 36.02 sq mi (93.29 km^{2})
  - Land: 35.40 sq mi (91.69 km^{2})
  - Water: 0.62 sq mi (1.61 km^{2})
- Elevation: 1,132 ft (345 m)

Population (2020)
  - Total: 473
  - Density: 13.4/sq mi (5.2/km^{2})
- Time zone: UTC-5 (Eastern (EST))
  - Summer (DST): UTC-4 (EDT)
- ZIP code(s): 49667 (Merritt); 49632 (Falmouth)
- Area code: 231
- FIPS code: 26-12200
- GNIS feature ID: 1626015
- Website: Official website

Butterfield Township is a civil township of Missaukee County in the U.S. state of Michigan. As of the 2020 census, the township population was 473.

== Communities ==
- Butterfield is a small unincorporated community in the southeast portion of the township at 44°16′40″N 84°57′12″W. It is approximately three and a half miles south of Merritt on County Road 565 and the eastern terminus of County Road 584. A rural post office operated from October 30, 1895, until October 31, 1922.
- Merritt is an unincorporated community in the northern part of the township on County Road 565 just south of M-55 at 44°19′47″N 84°56′41″W.
- Edson Corners 44°17′30″N 84°53′22″W was a community and former post office in the township on the Muskegon River. It was named for Edson Witherell. The post office operated from August 21, 1878, until March 15, 1900.

== Geography ==
According to the U.S. Census Bureau, the township has a total area of 36.02 square miles (93.29 km^{2}), of which 35.40 square miles (91.69 km^{2}) are land and 0.62 square miles (1.61 km^{2}), or 1.72%, are water.

The Muskegon River, a tributary of Lake Michigan, flows north to south across the township.

== Highways ==
- M-55 forms the northern boundary of the township.
- M-74 was a former state highway that existed from 1919 to 1939.

== Demographics ==
Historical population
Census	Pop.	Note	%±
1900	221		—
1910	323		46.2%
1920	283		−12.4%
1930	294		3.9%
1940	375		27.6%
1950	302		−19.5%
1960	276		−8.6%
1970	272		−1.4%
1980	390		43.4%
1990	452		15.9%
2000	548		21.2%
2010	489		−10.8%
2020	473		−3.3%
U.S. Decennial Census

As of the census of 2000, there were 548 people, 211 households, and 155 families residing in the township. The population density was 15.3 inhabitants per square mile (5.9/km^{2}). There were 388 housing units at an average density of 10.8 per square mile (4.2/km^{2}). The racial makeup of the township was 97.63% White, 0.18% African American, 0.55% Native American, 0.18% Asian, and 1.46% from two or more races. Hispanic or Latino of any race were 0.18% of the population.

There were 211 households, out of which 31.3% had children under the age of 18 living with them, 59.7% were married couples living together, 10.4% had a female householder with no husband present, and 26.5% were non-families. 21.8% of all households were made up of individuals, and 8.1% had someone living alone who was 65 years of age or older. The average household size was 2.60 and the average family size was 2.97.

In the township the population was spread out, with 25.2% under the age of 18, 7.8% from 18 to 24, 27.7% from 25 to 44, 25.9% from 45 to 64, and 13.3% who were 65 years of age or older. The median age was 40 years. For every 100 females, there were 98.6 males. For every 100 females age 18 and over, there were 101.0 males.

The median income for a household in the township was $37,188, and the median income for a family was $40,357. Males had a median income of $27,375 versus $21,250 for females. The per capita income for the township was $16,993. About 7.1% of families and 8.8% of the population were below the poverty line, including 13.8% of those under age 18 and 7.0% of those age 65 or over.
