= Norwich Township, Missaukee County, Michigan =

Norwich Township, Michigan
- Civil township
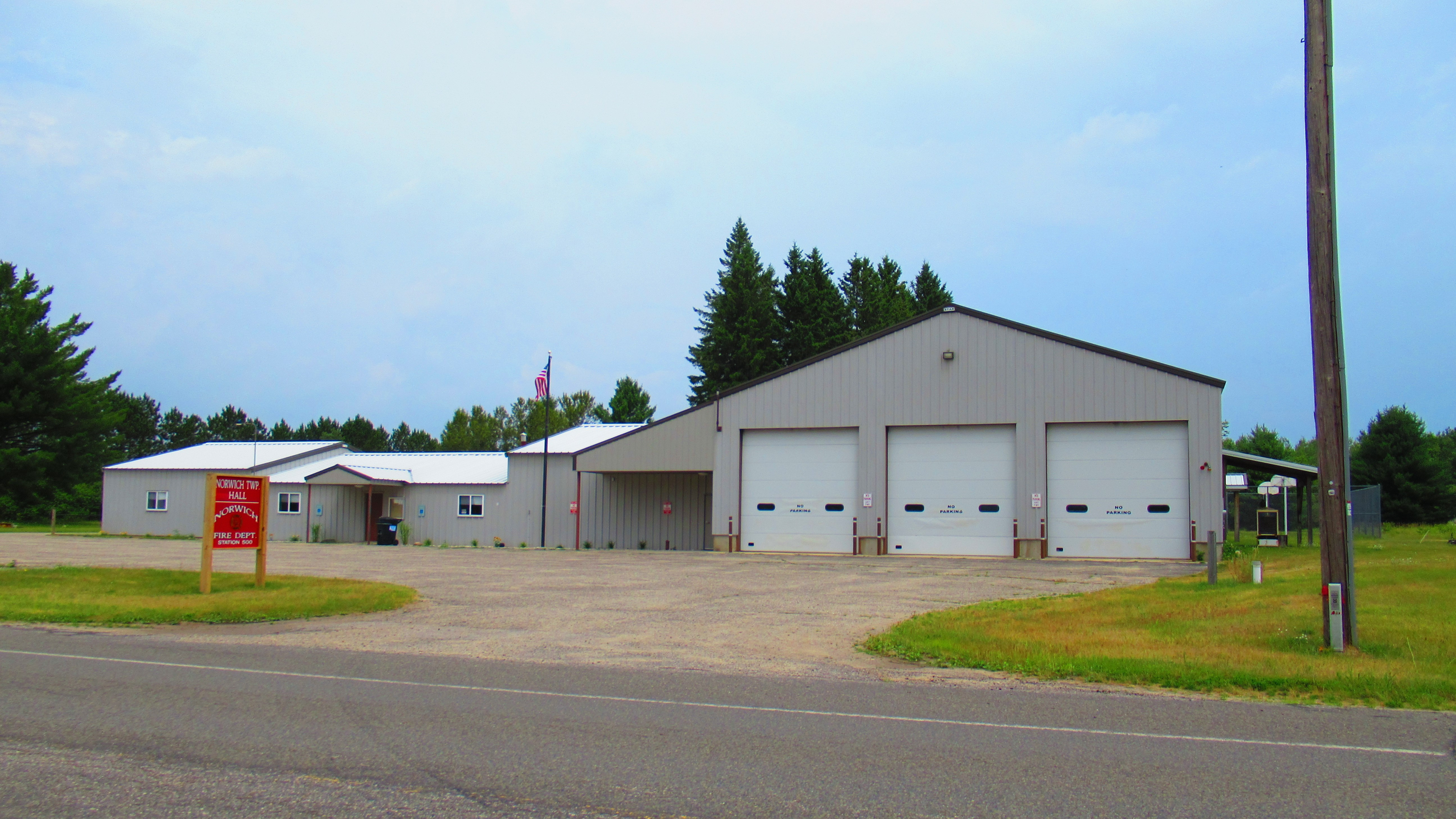
- Norwich Township Hall and Fire Department

- Location within Missaukee County

- Location within the state of Michigan Location within the United States
- Coordinates: 44°28′50″N 84°57′19″W
- Country: United States
- State: Michigan
- County: Missaukee
- Established: 1881

Government
  - Supervisor: Lois Whipple
  - Clerk: Heather Klein

Area
  - Total: 72.60 sq mi (188.03 km^{2})
  - Land: 71.92 sq mi (186.27 km^{2})
  - Water: 0.68 sq mi (1.76 km^{2})
- Elevation: 1,191 ft (363 m)

Population (2020)
  - Total: 631
  - Density: 8.77/sq mi (3.39/km^{2})
- Time zone: UTC-5 (Eastern (EST))
  - Summer (DST): UTC-4 (EDT)
- ZIP code(s): 49651 (Lake City); 48653 (Roscommon); 49667 (Merritt)
- Area code: 231
- FIPS code: 26-59280
- GNIS feature ID: 1626823
- Website: Official website

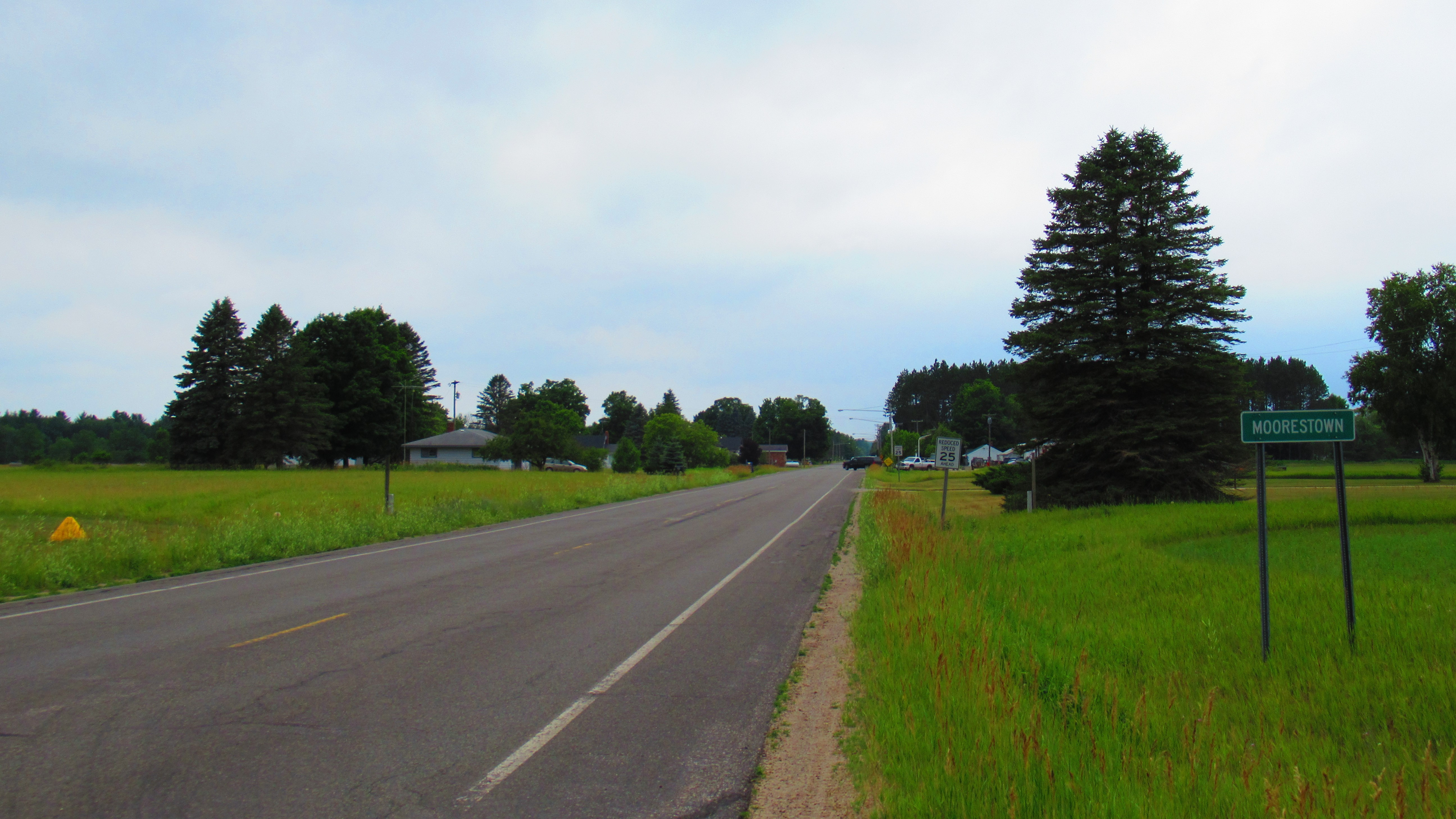
Community of Moorestown

Norwich Township is a civil township of Missaukee County in the U.S. state of Michigan. The population was 631 at the 2020 census.

== Communities ==
- Moorestown is a small unincorporated community in the township at 44°27′57″N 85°00′07″W. The township hall is located in Moorestown. In the 1920s, Moorestown was on the route of highway M-74.
- Stratford is a ghost town within the township, located at 44°29′44.3″N 84°57′08.4″W. The community was established in 1898 as a station along the Chicago and West Michigan Railway. A post office operated in Stratford from 1898 until 1908. The community has largely been abandoned since 1937.

== Geography ==
Norwich Township is in the northeast corner of Missaukee County, bordered to the north by Kalkaska County, to the east by Roscommon County, and at its northeast corner by Crawford County. According to the U.S. Census Bureau, the township has a total area of 72.60 square miles (188.03 km^{2}), of which 71.92 square miles (186.27 km^{2}) are land and 0.68 square miles (1.76 km^{2}), or 0.94%, are water.

=== Climate ===
Kalkaska 11SE is a weather station 8.5 miles (13.7 km) north of Norwich Township.

Climate data for Kalkaska 11SE, Michigan, 1991–2020 normals: 1083ft (330m)
| Month | Jan | Feb | Mar | Apr | May | Jun | Jul | Aug | Sep | Oct | Nov | Dec | Year |
|---|---|---|---|---|---|---|---|---|---|---|---|---|---|
| Record high °F (°C) | 51 (11) | 59 (15) | 86 (30) | 85 (29) | 93 (34) | 94 (34) | 96 (36) | 96 (36) | 91 (33) | 88 (31) | 74 (23) | 59 (15) | 96 (36) |
| Mean maximum °F (°C) | 43.3 (6.3) | 46.3 (7.9) | 58.5 (14.7) | 75.3 (24.1) | 86.7 (30.4) | 88.5 (31.4) | 90.1 (32.3) | 88.4 (31.3) | 85.4 (29.7) | 75.5 (24.2) | 61.6 (16.4) | 47.7 (8.7) | 91.8 (33.2) |
| Mean daily maximum °F (°C) | 23.9 (−4.5) | 27.4 (−2.6) | 37.4 (3.0) | 51.1 (10.6) | 65.3 (18.5) | 74.0 (23.3) | 76.6 (24.8) | 75.7 (24.3) | 68.2 (20.1) | 54.6 (12.6) | 41.0 (5.0) | 30.2 (−1.0) | 52.1 (11.2) |
| Daily mean °F (°C) | 16.8 (−8.4) | 17.7 (−7.9) | 26.7 (−2.9) | 39.7 (4.3) | 52.6 (11.4) | 61.6 (16.4) | 64.6 (18.1) | 63.9 (17.7) | 55.8 (13.2) | 44.4 (6.9) | 33.2 (0.7) | 23.9 (−4.5) | 41.7 (5.4) |
| Mean daily minimum °F (°C) | 9.8 (−12.3) | 8.0 (−13.3) | 16.0 (−8.9) | 28.3 (−2.1) | 39.8 (4.3) | 49.2 (9.6) | 52.5 (11.4) | 52.1 (11.2) | 43.4 (6.3) | 34.3 (1.3) | 25.3 (−3.7) | 17.6 (−8.0) | 31.4 (−0.4) |
| Mean minimum °F (°C) | −11.9 (−24.4) | −11.2 (−24.0) | −8.0 (−22.2) | 12.5 (−10.8) | 24.9 (−3.9) | 33.1 (0.6) | 40.8 (4.9) | 38.7 (3.7) | 31.1 (−0.5) | 22.8 (−5.1) | 11.1 (−11.6) | 0.9 (−17.3) | −15.1 (−26.2) |
| Record low °F (°C) | −25 (−32) | −33 (−36) | −26 (−32) | −5 (−21) | 18 (−8) | 29 (−2) | 37 (3) | 32 (0) | 26 (−3) | 19 (−7) | 1 (−17) | −19 (−28) | −33 (−36) |
| Average precipitation inches (mm) | 2.26 (57) | 1.99 (51) | 2.14 (54) | 3.49 (89) | 3.65 (93) | 3.55 (90) | 3.27 (83) | 3.57 (91) | 3.54 (90) | 3.77 (96) | 3.03 (77) | 2.22 (56) | 36.48 (927) |
| Average snowfall inches (cm) | 28.50 (72.4) | 25.30 (64.3) | 15.40 (39.1) | 9.50 (24.1) | 0.50 (1.3) | 0.00 (0.00) | 0.00 (0.00) | 0.00 (0.00) | 0.00 (0.00) | 2.60 (6.6) | 14.00 (35.6) | 30.50 (77.5) | 126.3 (320.9) |
Source 1: NOAA
Source 2: XMACIS (records & monthly max/mins)

== Demographics ==
Historical population
| Census | Pop. | Note | %± |
|---|---|---|---|
| 1890 | 441 | | — |
| 1900 | 789 | | 78.9% |
| 1910 | 695 | | −11.9% |
| 1920 | 417 | | −40.0% |
| 1930 | 299 | | −28.3% |
| 1940 | 443 | | 48.2% |
| 1950 | 361 | | −18.5% |
| 1960 | 307 | | −15.0% |
| 1970 | 321 | | 4.6% |
| 1980 | 418 | | 30.2% |
| 1990 | 505 | | 20.8% |
| 2000 | 646 | | 27.9% |
| 2010 | 611 | | −5.4% |
| 2020 | 631 | | 3.3% |
U.S. Decennial Census

As of the census of 2000, there were 646 people, 258 households, and 186 families residing in the township. The population density was 9.0 per square mile (3.5/km^{2}). There were 547 housing units at an average density of 7.6 per square mile (2.9/km^{2}). The racial makeup of the township was 97.83% White, 0.15% African American, 0.46% Native American, 0.31% Asian, 0.15% from other races, and 1.08% from two or more races. Hispanic or Latino of any race were 0.93% of the population.

There were 258 households, out of which 29.1% had children under the age of 18 living with them, 60.5% were married couples living together, 5.4% had a female householder with no husband present, and 27.9% were non-families. 24.8% of all households were made up of individuals, and 10.1% had someone living alone who was 65 years of age or older. The average household size was 2.50 and the average family size was 2.96.

In the township the population was spread out, with 25.5% under the age of 18, 6.3% from 18 to 24, 24.8% from 25 to 44, 26.8% from 45 to 64, and 16.6% who were 65 years of age or older. The median age was 40 years. For every 100 females, there were 104.4 males. For every 100 females age 18 and over, there were 107.3 males.

The median income for a household in the township was $27,788, and the median income for a family was $32,045. Males had a median income of $29,318 versus $14,167 for females. The per capita income for the township was $16,460. About 13.8% of families and 18.2% of the population were below the poverty line, including 26.5% of those under age 18 and 23.0% of those age 65 or over.
