= Betsy Coffia =

American politician (born 1977)

Member of the Michigan House of Representatives from the 103rd district
- Incumbent
- Assumed office January 1, 2023
- Preceded by: Daire Rendon

Member of the Grand Traverse County Commission
- In office 2019–2023

Personal details
- Born: September 7, 1977 (age 48) Valparaiso, Indiana, U.S.
- Party: Democratic
- Education: Northwestern Michigan College (AA); Ferris State University (BSW)

Betsy Coffia is an American politician serving as a member of the Michigan House of Representatives from the 103rd district. Elected in November 2022, she assumed office on January 1, 2023. She is a member of the Democratic Party.

== Early life and education ==
Coffia was born in Valparaiso, Indiana, on September 7, 1977, and was raised in Rapid City, Michigan. She earned an Associate degree from Northwestern Michigan College and a Bachelor of Social Work degree (BSW) from Ferris State University.

== Career ==
Coffia began her career as a newspaper reporter in 1997, and worked for six years as a weekly newspaper editor. After receiving a degree from Ferris State University, she became a Head Start social worker.

In 2016, Coffia ran for Michigan's 104th district, but lost to incumbent Larry Inman. In 2018, Coffia successfully ran for a seat in the Grand Traverse County Commission, having flipped a district with a multi-term Republican incumbent. She was re-elected in 2020. In 2020, while serving on the Grand Traverse County commission, Coffia underwent surgery to remove a benign brain tumor.

In 2022, Coffia ran for the newly redrawn 103rd district, and won, defeating Republican Jack O'Malley, who was then serving from the 101st district.

In 2024, Coffia won renomination in the Democratic primary, and was endorsed by Secretary of State Jocelyn Benson and EMILY's List. Coffia won reelection, defeating Republican challenger Lisa Trombley.

== Political positions ==
Coffia supports protecting reproductive rights and voting rights. In addition, she supports public education and fighting climate change.

Political offices
| Preceded by Daire Rendon | Michigan Representatives; 103rd District; 2023–present | Succeeded by Incumbent |
