= Daire Rendon =

American politician

Member of the Michigan House of Representatives from the 103rd district
- In office January 1, 2017 – January 1, 2023
- Preceded by: Bruce Rendon
- Succeeded by: Betsy Coffia

Personal details
- Born: May 26, 1952 (age 74) Jacksonville, North Carolina, U.S.
- Party: Republican
- Spouse: Bruce Rendon

Daire Rendon (born May 26, 1952) is an American politician who served in the Michigan House of Representatives from the 103rd district from 2017 to 2023, succeeding her husband, Bruce, who was term-limited in 2016.

== Career ==
On November 18, 2020, Rendon introduced House Resolution No. 324 to impeach Governor Whitmer. The state senate majority leader and state house speaker (both Republicans) opposed calls for impeachment, calling it "shameful". The resolution was "dead on arrival", as the legislature had been adjourned and not expected to take action in a lame-duck session.

In December 2020, Rendon and Matt Maddock joined a federal lawsuit filed by Trump supporters to overturn the election results. The suit asked for state lawmakers to certify the election results, therefore allowing the Republican-led Michigan Legislature to overturn Biden's victory in the state. The judge dismissed the suit, stating that their arguments were "flat-out wrong" and "a fundamental and obvious misreading of the Constitution."

In August 2022, it was reported that Michigan Attorney General candidate Matthew DePerno, Rendon, and Barry County Sheriff Dar Leaf were among nine Michigan Republicans who could potentially face criminal charges over allegedly illegally accessing voting equipment in a quest to prove false claims of voter fraud in the 2020 election. In a letter to Michigan Secretary of State Jocelyn Benson, Chief Deputy Attorney General Christina M. Grossi requested a special prosecutor to consider bringing charges against the nine individuals. Rendon and DePerno were indicted by a grand jury on August 1, 2023. A third defendant, pro-Trump attorney Stefanie Lambert, was also indicted in the case on August 4.
