= Bruce Rendon =

American politician

Bruce R. Rendon

Member of the Michigan House of Representatives from the 103rd district
- In office January 1, 2011 – December 31, 2016
- Preceded by: Joel Sheltrown
- Succeeded by: Daire Rendon

Personal details
- Born: September 17, 1951 (age 75) Hastings, Michigan
- Party: Republican
- Spouse: Daire
- Children: 2 daughters, 3 grandchildren
- Education: Ferris State University
- Website: Rep. Bruce Rendon

Bruce R. Rendon is a former member of the Michigan House of Representatives, first elected in 2010 and re-elected to a second term in 2012. His district consists of Missaukee, Roscommon, Ogemaw, Kalkaska, and Otsego Counties. He was term-limited in 2016 and was succeeded by his wife, Daire.

He is the owner and operator of Rendon Quality Construction, the owner of Renmoor Jersey Farm, a former president and director of the Michigan Jersey Cattle Club, a member and three-time president of the Northwest Michigan Home Builders Association, and a former president of the Michigan Association of Home Builders.
