= Caldwell Township, Michigan =

- Civil township
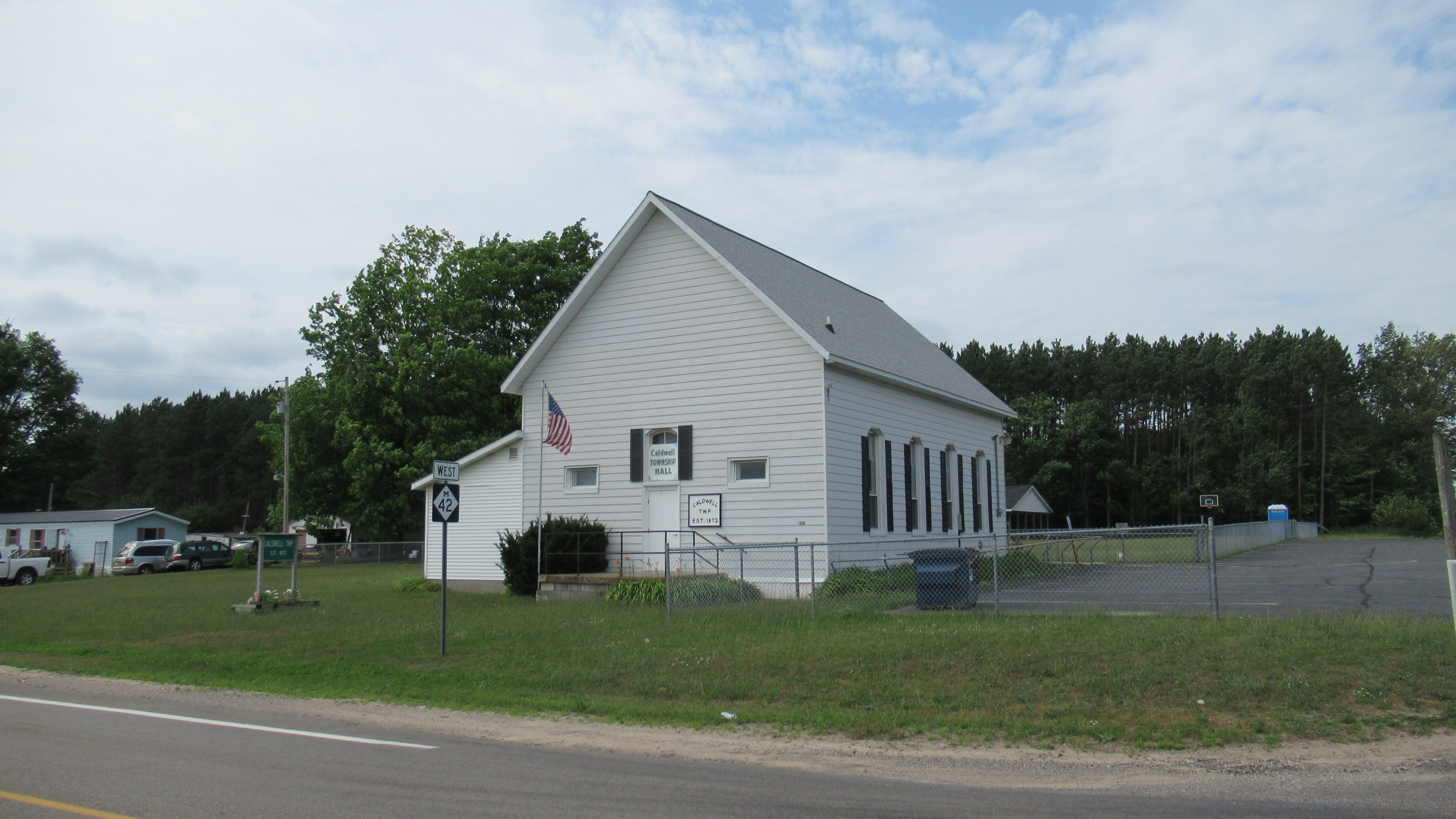
- Caldwell Township Hall

- Location within Missaukee County (red) and an administered portion of the Jennings CDP (pink)

- Location within the state of Michigan Location within the United States
- Coordinates: 44°22′35″N 85°15′28″W
- Country: United States
- State: Michigan
- County: Missaukee
- Established: 1872

Government
  - Supervisor: Mike Lutke
  - Clerk: Shelley Sloat

Area
  - Total: 35.59 sq mi (92.18 km^{2})
  - Land: 34.21 sq mi (88.60 km^{2})
  - Water: 1.38 sq mi (3.57 km^{2})
- Elevation: 1,273 ft (388 m)

Population (2020)
  - Total: 1,394
  - Density: 40.7/sq mi (15.7/km^{2})
- Time zone: UTC-5 (Eastern (EST))
  - Summer (DST): UTC-4 (EDT)
- ZIP code(s): 49663 (Manton); 49651 (Lake City)
- Area code: 231
- FIPS code: 26-12440
- GNIS feature ID: 1626018
- Website: Official website

Caldwell Township is a civil township of Missaukee County in the U.S. state of Michigan. The population was 1,394 at the 2020 census.

== Geography ==
According to the U.S. Census Bureau, the township has a total area of 35.59 square miles (92.18 km^{2}), of which 34.21 square miles (88.60 km^{2}) are land and 1.38 square miles (3.57 km^{2}) (3.88%) are water.

The northernmost shores of Lake Missaukee extend into Caldwell Township. More than a dozen other named lakes occupy the southern part of the township, including Twin Lake, Dyer Lake, Goose Lake, and the northern end of Crooked Lake.

=== Major highways ===
- M-42 runs east–west through the township.
- M-66 forms the eastern boundary of the township.

== Communities ==
- Arlene is an unincorporated community at 44°23′24″N 85°17′12″W. A post office opened at Arlene in 1903, with Walter W. Combs as its first postmaster.
- Jennings is an unincorporated community and census-designated place (CDP) that is partially within the township.
- The city of Lake City is adjacent to the township, to the southeast.

== Demographics ==
Historical population
| Census | Pop. | Note | %± |
|---|---|---|---|
| 1880 | 104 | | — |
| 1890 | 405 | | 289.4% |
| 1900 | 708 | | 74.8% |
| 1910 | 687 | | −3.0% |
| 1920 | 561 | | −18.3% |
| 1930 | 377 | | −32.8% |
| 1940 | 566 | | 50.1% |
| 1950 | 516 | | −8.8% |
| 1960 | 436 | | −15.5% |
| 1970 | 511 | | 17.2% |
| 1980 | 856 | | 67.5% |
| 1990 | 1,104 | | 29.0% |
| 2000 | 1,363 | | 23.5% |
| 2010 | 1,317 | | −3.4% |
| 2020 | 1,394 | | 5.8% |
U.S. Decennial Census

As of the census of 2000, there were 1,363 people, 523 households, and 369 families residing in the township. The population density was 39.6 inhabitants per square mile (15.3/km^{2}). There were 838 housing units at an average density of 24.3 per square mile (9.4/km^{2}). The racial makeup of the township was 96.70% White, 0.73% Native American, 1.03% from other races, and 1.54% from two or more races. Hispanic or Latino of any race were 1.17% of the population.

There were 523 households, out of which 33.8% had children under the age of 18 living with them, 54.1% were married couples living together, 11.7% had a female householder with no husband present, and 29.4% were non-families. 23.9% of all households were made up of individuals, and 11.1% had someone living alone who was 65 years of age or older. The average household size was 2.56 and the average family size was 3.04.

In the township the population was spread out, with 27.9% under the age of 18, 7.5% from 18 to 24, 27.7% from 25 to 44, 22.2% from 45 to 64, and 14.7% who were 65 years of age or older. The median age was 36 years. For every 100 females, there were 96.1 males. For every 100 females age 18 and over, there were 92.0 males.

The median income for a household in the township was $31,719, and the median income for a family was $35,214. Males had a median income of $28,558 versus $21,719 for females. The per capita income for the township was $14,674. About 15.5% of families and 19.4% of the population were below the poverty line, including 26.0% of those under age 18 and 14.8% of those age 65 or over. Caldwell township's population was 1,423 people as of 2007. It has had a population growth of 4.40% since 2000. The median home cost is $128,900. Caldwell township's cost of living is 19.81% lower than the U.S. average.
