= Pioneer Township, Michigan =

- Civil township
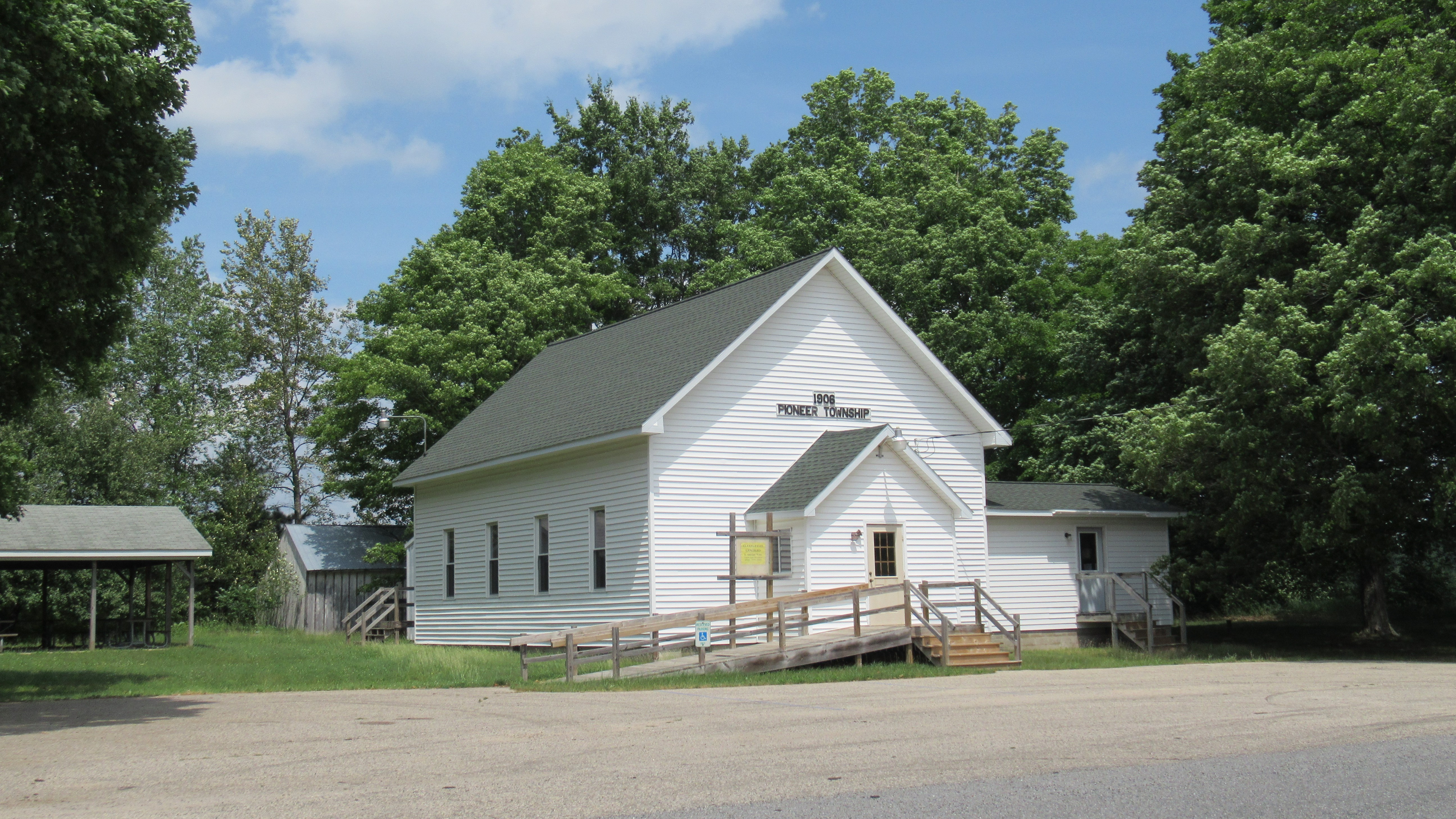
- Pioneer Township Hall

- Location within Missaukee County

- Location within the state of Michigan Location within the United States
- Coordinates: 44°28′42″N 85°09′40″W
- Country: United States
- State: Michigan
- County: Missaukee
- Established: 1871

Government
  - Supervisor: Emily Alexander
  - Clerk: Karen Emond

Area
  - Total: 35.97 sq mi (93.16 km^{2})
  - Land: 35.93 sq mi (93.06 km^{2})
  - Water: 0.039 sq mi (0.10 km^{2})
- Elevation: 1,319 ft (402 m)

Population (2020)
  - Total: 508
  - Density: 14.1/sq mi (5.4/km^{2})
- Time zone: UTC-5 (Eastern (EST))
  - Summer (DST): UTC-4 (EDT)
- ZIP code(s): 49651 (Lake City); 49663 (Manton)
- Area code: 231
- FIPS code: 26-64460
- GNIS feature ID: 1626907
- Website: Official website

Pioneer Township is a civil township of Missaukee County in the U.S. state of Michigan. The population was 508 at the 2020 census, up from 451 in 2010.

== Communities ==
- Pioneer is an unincorporated community near the center of the township at 44°28′03″N 85°09′21″W. In the 1920s, Pioneer was on the route of highway M-74.

== Geography ==
Pioneer Township is in northern Missaukee County, bordered to the north by Kalkaska County. According to the U.S. Census Bureau, the township has a total area of 35.97 square miles (93.16 km^{2}), of which 35.93 square miles (93.06 km^{2}) are land and 0.04 square miles (0.10 km^{2}), or 0.10%, are water.

== Demographics ==
Historical population
Census	Pop.	Note	%±
1880	299		—
1890	154		−48.5%
1900	263		70.8%
1910	196		−25.5%
1920	161		−17.9%
1930	151		−6.2%
1940	237		57.0%
1950	211		−11.0%
1960	210		−0.5%
1970	235		11.9%
1980	323		37.4%
1990	388		20.1%
2000	460		18.6%
2010	451		−2.0%
2020	508		12.6%
U.S. Decennial Census

As of the census of 2000, there were 460 people, 184 households, and 138 families residing in the township. The population density was 12.8 per square mile (4.9/km^{2}). There were 346 housing units at an average density of 9.6 per square mile (3.7/km^{2}). The racial makeup of the township was 97.39% White, 0.65% Native American, 0.22% Asian, 0.22% from other races, and 1.52% from two or more races. Hispanic or Latino of any race were 0.87% of the population.

There were 184 households, out of which 29.9% had children under the age of 18 living with them, 65.8% were married couples living together, 4.3% had a female householder with no husband present, and 25.0% were non-families. 19.0% of all households were made up of individuals, and 9.2% had someone living alone who was 65 years of age or older. The average household size was 2.49 and the average family size was 2.81.

In the township the population was spread out, with 22.0% under the age of 18, 6.3% from 18 to 24, 25.0% from 25 to 44, 35.0% from 45 to 64, and 11.7% who were 65 years of age or older. The median age was 43 years. For every 100 females, there were 110.0 males. For every 100 females age 18 and over, there were 113.7 males.

The median income for a household in the township was $32,000, and the median income for a family was $35,833. Males had a median income of $33,750 versus $20,125 for females. The per capita income for the township was $16,837. About 7.8% of families and 8.9% of the population were below the poverty line, including 4.9% of those under age 18 and 14.0% of those age 65 or over.
