= M-74 (Michigan highway) =

Former state highway in Michigan

M-74
- M-74 highlighted in red on a modern map

Route information
- Maintained by MSHD
- Length: 18.4 mi (29.6 km)
- Existed: 1919–December 23, 1939

Major junctions
- West end: M-66 in Pioneer
- South end: M-55 near Merritt

Location
- Country: United States
- State: Michigan
- Counties: Missaukee

Highway system
- Michigan State Trunkline Highway System; Interstate; US; State; Byways
← M-73	→ I-75

M-74 was the designation of a state trunkline highway in the US state of Michigan. The highway ran through rural Missaukee County connecting Pioneer with Merritt. The highway was designated by 1919 along a longer route. It was shortened before it was totally removed from the highway system in the late 1930s. The Missaukee County Road Commission initially refused to accept jurisdiction over the roadway and refused to maintain it leading to a legal fight with the state highway commissioner.

== Route description ==
M-74 started at a junction with M-66 near the community of Pioneer. It ran east on Moorestown Road through Stittsville to Moorestown before turning south on Nelson Road. There it ran through the community of Star City, turning west briefly on Walker Road and running south on Star City Road before terminating at a junction with M-55 west of Merritt. All of M-74 was a gravel highway.

== History ==
On July 1, 1919, M-74 ran between Pioneer and M-55 west of Merritt. There it turned east running concurrently with M-55 to Merritt where it turned south to Moddersville and terminated. In 1933, federal funding for a replacement bridge over the west branch of the Muskegon River south of Star City was approved at a cost of $12,000 (equivalent to $230,000 in 2024), and another $4,600 (equivalent to $88,000 in 2024) for the replacement of the bridge over Butterfield Creek north of Moddersville.

The spur south of Merrit remained a state highway through at least late 1938. Late that year or early the next, the roadway between Merritt and Moddersville was turned back to local control and removed from the highway system. In December 1939, the remainder of the highway was decommissioned in its entirety, as part of 212 miles (341 km) of highway in Northern Michigan that was turned back to local control. Those highways, at the time, cost $300,000 (equivalent to $5.29 million in 2024) a year to maintain. The transfer was approved by the State Administrative Board on December 23, 1939. The Missaukee County Road Commission had refused to accept responsibility for the roadway's maintenance in a notice to the board. State Highway Commissioner Murray D. Van Wagoner stated at the time, "as far as I'm concerned, those are county roads now and the counties will have to maintain them."

The next month, Van Wagoner and the Missaukee County prosecutor appealed to the state Attorney General Thomas Read to settle the status of the roadways. The prosecutor claimed that the commissioner lacked the authority to transfer an entire highway to local control. Van Wagoner had described traffic levels on the roadways as insufficient to justify their status as a state highway. At the time, the former highways averaged 156 vehicles per day, while all state highways averaged 1,070.

The later that month on January 31, a group of farmers stole snow plows to clear the route of M-74 of snow after a recent storm. The county had refused to clear snow from the roadway, stating it lacked the funds to do so. Van Wagoner declared that the state would plow the roadway as a matter of emergency assistance and "arbitrate who is going to pay the bill later". The state continued to maintain M-74 and bill the county after the incident.

Read refused to settle the dispute on February 5, and referred the matter to the courts instead. Delta County refused to take their portion of the dispute to court on February 10, 1940 and accepted jurisdiction at that time. The Michigan Association of Road Commissioners and Engineers offered to negotiate a truce during the annual Michigan highway conference in mid-February with the state highway commissioner on future highway transfers. The attorney general assigned an assistant to work with Van Wagoner on a test case later that month.

The Missaukee County Road Commission took over maintenance of the state highways in the county under contract with the state in August 1943. The M-74 highway designation has not been used since its decommissioning.

== Major intersections ==
The entire highway was in Missaukee County.

Location	mi	km	Destinations	Notes
Pioneer	0.0	0.0	M-66 – Lake City, Kalkaska	Historic western terminus
Merritt	18.4	29.6	M-55 – Lake City, Houghton Lake	Southern terminus at time of decommissioning
1.000 mi = 1.609 km; 1.000 km = 0.621 mi
