= Enterprise Township, Michigan =

- Civil township
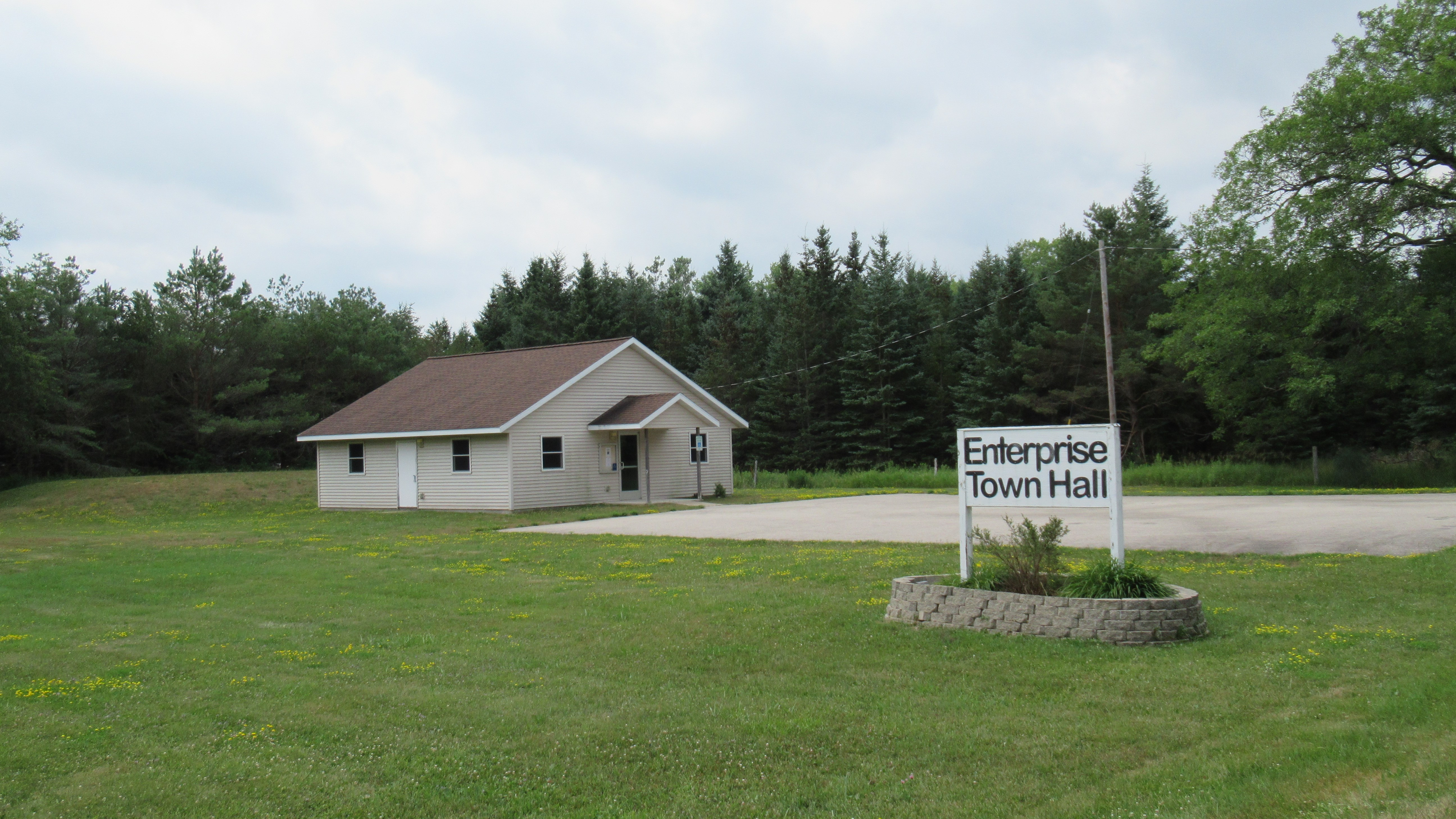
- Enterprise Town Hall

- Location within Missaukee County

- Location within the state of Michigan Location within the United States
- Coordinates: 44°22′57″N 84°54′35″W
- Country: United States
- State: Michigan
- County: Missaukee
- Established: 1904

Government
  - Supervisor: Wyatt Howey
  - Clerk: K. Lynn Pope

Area
  - Total: 35.02 sq mi (90.70 km^{2})
  - Land: 34.47 sq mi (89.28 km^{2})
  - Water: 0.55 sq mi (1.42 km^{2})
- Elevation: 1,152 ft (351 m)

Population (2020)
  - Total: 174
  - Density: 5.05/sq mi (1.95/km^{2})
- Time zone: UTC-5 (Eastern (EST))
  - Summer (DST): UTC-4 (EDT)
- ZIP code(s): 49667 (Merritt); 49651 (Lake City); 48629 (Houghton Lake)
- Area code: 231
- FIPS code: 26-26200
- GNIS feature ID: 1626244
- Website: Official website

Enterprise Township is a civil township of Missaukee County in the U.S. state of Michigan. The population was 174 at the 2020 census.

== Geography ==
According to the United States Census Bureau, the township has a total area of 35.02 square miles (90.70 km^{2}), of which 34.47 square miles (89.28 km^{2}) are land and 0.55 square miles (1.4 km^{2}) (1.57%) are water.

The Reedsburg Dam and portions of the Dead Stream Flooding State Wildlife Management Area are located in the southeast part of Enterprise Township along the Muskegon River.

=== Major highways ===
- M-55 forms the southern boundary of the township.

== Demographics ==
Historical population
Census	Pop.	Note	%±
1910	174		—
1920	150		−13.8%
1930	135		−10.0%
1940	152		12.6%
1950	146		−3.9%
1960	147		0.7%
1970	118		−19.7%
1980	127		7.6%
1990	127		0.0%
2000	194		52.8%
2010	194		0.0%
2020	174		−10.3%
U.S. Decennial Census

As of the census of 2000, there were 194 people, 75 households, and 53 families residing in the township. The population density was 5.6 inhabitants per square mile (2.2/km^{2}). There were 195 housing units at an average density of 5.6 per square mile (2.2/km^{2}). The racial makeup of the township was 97.94% White, 1.55% from other races, and 0.52% from two or more races. Hispanic or Latino of any race were 1.55% of the population.

There were 75 households, out of which 28.0% had children under the age of 18 living with them, 65.3% were married couples living together, 4.0% had a female householder with no husband present, and 29.3% were non-families. 20.0% of all households were made up of individuals, and 6.7% had someone living alone who was 65 years of age or older. The average household size was 2.59 and the average family size was 3.06.

In the township the population was spread out, with 27.3% under the age of 18, 6.2% from 18 to 24, 27.8% from 25 to 44, 28.9% from 45 to 64, and 9.8% who were 65 years of age or older. The median age was 37 years. For every 100 females, there were 106.4 males. For every 100 females age 18 and over, there were 113.6 males.

The median income for a household in the township was $33,889, and the median income for a family was $35,875. Males had a median income of $22,188 versus $15,417 for females. The per capita income for the township was $14,061. About 4.3% of families and 3.9% of the population were below the poverty line, including 4.9% of those under the age of eighteen and none of those 65 or over.
