= Lake Township, Missaukee County, Michigan =

Lake Township, Michigan
- Civil township
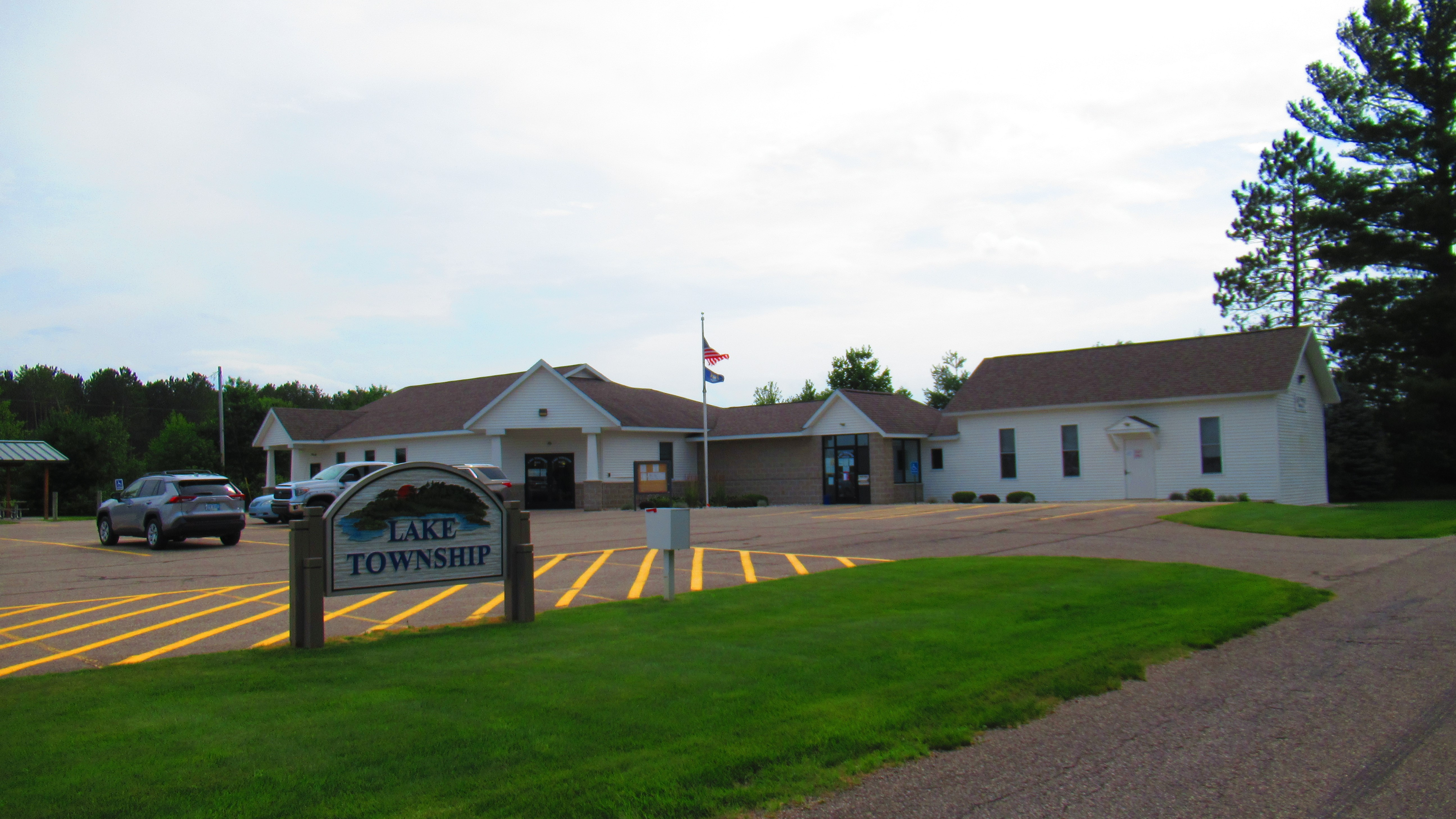
- Lake Township Hall

- Location within Missaukee County and an administered portion of the Jennings CDP (pink)

- Location within the state of Michigan Location within the United States
- Coordinates: 44°17′18″N 85°16′32″W
- Country: United States
- State: Michigan
- County: Missaukee
- Established: 1883

Government
  - Supervisor: Rob Hall
  - Clerk: Korinda Winkelmann

Area
  - Total: 36.04 sq mi (93.34 km^{2})
  - Land: 31.56 sq mi (81.74 km^{2})
  - Water: 4.47 sq mi (11.58 km^{2})
- Elevation: 1,253 ft (382 m)

Population (2020)
  - Total: 2,827
  - Density: 89.6/sq mi (34.6/km^{2})
- Time zone: UTC-5 (Eastern (EST))
  - Summer (DST): UTC-4 (EDT)
- ZIP code(s): 49651 (Lake City); 49601 (Cadillac); 49657 (McBain)
- Area code: 231
- FIPS code: 26-44380
- GNIS feature ID: 1626577
- Website: Official website

Lake Township is a civil township of Missaukee County in the U.S. state of Michigan. The population was 2,827 at the 2020 census, which makes it the county's most-populated municipality.

== Communities ==
- Jennings is an unincorporated community and census-designated place in the north portion of the township at 44°19′58″N 85°17′53″W.

== Geography ==
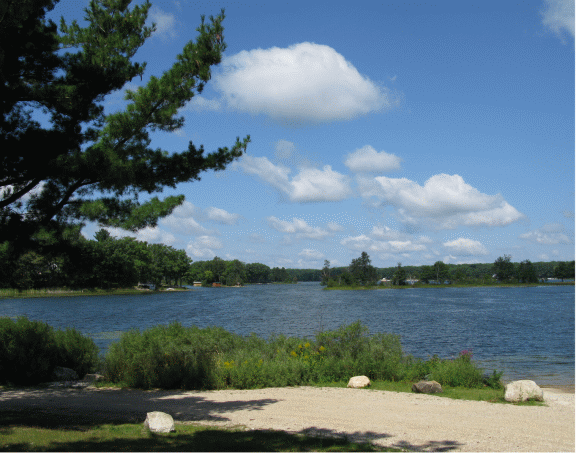
Lake Sapphire

Lake Township is in western Missaukee County, bordered to the northeast by Lake City, the county seat, and to the west by Wexford County. The township center is 7 miles (11 km) by road southwest of Lake City and the same distance northeast of the city of Cadillac.

According to the U.S. Census Bureau, the township has a total area of 36.04 square miles (93.34 km^{2}), of which 31.56 square miles (81.74 km^{2}) are land and 4.47 square miles (11.58 km^{2}), or 12.41%, are water.

Lake Township includes several large lakes, including Lake Missaukee, Crooked Lake, Lake Sapphire, and Round Lake. The Clam River, a tributary of the Muskegon River, flows west to southeast across the southern part of the township.

== Highways ==
- M-55 runs mostly concurrently with M-66 before splitting off to run east–west through the southern portion of the township.
- M-66 forms most of the eastern boundary of the township.

== Demographics ==
Historical population
Census	Pop.	Note	%±
1890	636		—
1900	1,099		72.8%
1910	1,405		27.8%
1920	1,207		−14.1%
1930	351		−70.9%
1940	410		16.8%
1950	433		5.6%
1960	427		−1.4%
1970	524		22.7%
1980	1,345		156.7%
1990	1,980		47.2%
2000	2,468		24.6%
2010	2,800		13.5%
2020	2,827		1.0%
U.S. Decennial Census

As of the census of 2000, there were 2,468 people, 1,005 households, and 756 families residing in the township. The population density was 77.9 inhabitants per square mile (30.1/km^{2}). There were 1,689 housing units at an average density of 53.3 per square mile (20.6/km^{2}). The racial makeup of the township was 97.61% White, 0.12% African American, 0.53% Native American, 0.49% Asian, 0.04% from other races, and 1.22% from two or more races. Hispanic or Latino of any race were 1.09% of the population.

There were 1,005 households, out of which 28.9% had children under the age of 18 living with them, 64.1% were married couples living together, 7.0% had a female householder with no husband present, and 24.7% were non-families. 20.2% of all households were made up of individuals, and 8.6% had someone living alone who was 65 years of age or older. The average household size was 2.45 and the average family size was 2.78.

In the township the population was spread out, with 22.9% under the age of 18, 6.2% from 18 to 24, 27.3% from 25 to 44, 27.2% from 45 to 64, and 16.5% who were 65 years of age or older. The median age was 42 years. For every 100 females, there were 98.7 males. For every 100 females age 18 and over, there were 99.5 males.

The median income for a household in the township was $36,934, and the median income for a family was $42,059. Males had a median income of $30,339 versus $22,148 for females. The per capita income for the township was $18,332. About 7.0% of families and 9.4% of the population were below the poverty line, including 11.3% of those under age 18 and 6.9% of those age 65 or over.
