= Holland Township, Missaukee County, Michigan =

Holland Township, Michigan
- Civil township
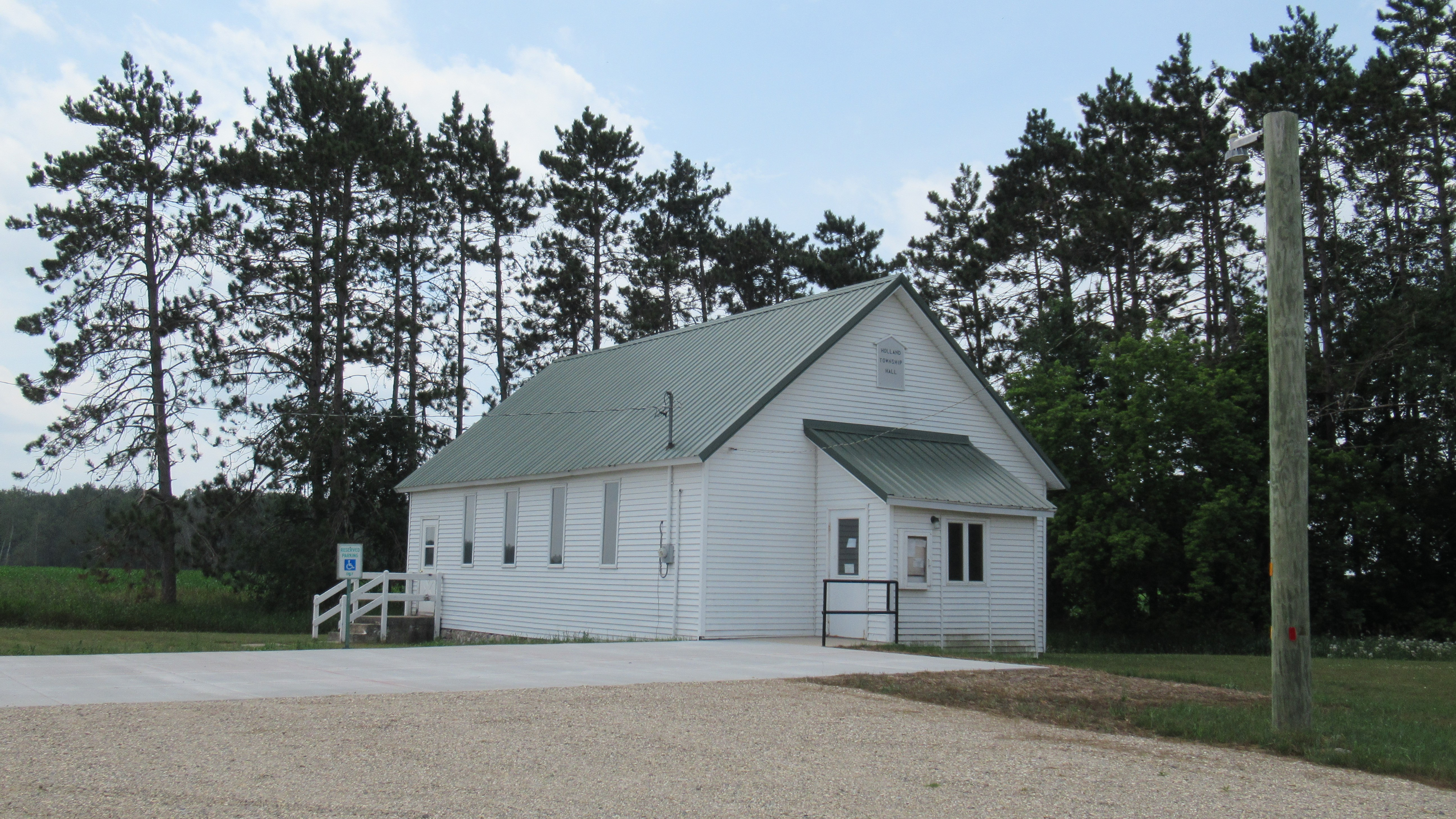
- Holland Township Hall

- Location within Missaukee County

- Location within the state of Michigan Location within the United States
- Coordinates: 44°12′34″N 84°54′48″W
- Country: United States
- State: Michigan
- County: Missaukee
- Established: 1911

Government
  - Supervisor: Robert Warson
  - Clerk: Donna Bode

Area
  - Total: 35.90 sq mi (92.98 km^{2})
  - Land: 35.62 sq mi (92.26 km^{2})
  - Water: 0.28 sq mi (0.73 km^{2})
- Elevation: 630 ft (192 m)

Population (2020)
  - Total: 221
  - Density: 6.2/sq mi (2.4/km^{2})
- Time zone: UTC-5 (Eastern (EST))
  - Summer (DST): UTC-4 (EDT)
- ZIP code(s): 49632 (Falmouth); 48625 (Harrison)
- Area code: 231
- FIPS code: 26-38620
- GNIS feature ID: 1626479
- Website: Official website

Holland Township is a civil township of Missaukee County in the U.S. state of Michigan. The population was 221 at the 2020 census.

== Communities ==
- Dolph is a small historical locale in the northeast of the township along the Muskegon River at 44°14′00″N 84°52′45″W. It was named for storekeeper Charles L. Dolph, who became the first postmaster on April 13, 1898. The post office was discontinued on June 15, 1926.
- Moddersville is a small unincorporated community in the township at 44°13′13″N 84°57′09″W. The first settlers here, the White family, arrived in 1875 but later moved away. Wynand Modders and his family moved here in 1878 and were soon followed by others, many of whom, like the Modders, were from the Netherlands. When a post office was established on August 6, 1890, it was named for the Modders, and Wynand became the first postmaster. The office was discontinued on October 31, 1934. In the 1920s, Moddersville was on the route of M-74.

== Geography ==
The township is in the southeast corner of Missaukee County, bordered to the east by Roscommon County and to the south by Clare County. According to the U.S. Census Bureau, the township has a total area of 35.90 square miles (92.98 km^{2}), of which 35.62 square miles (92.26 km^{2}) are land and 35.28 square miles (91.37 km^{2}), or 0.81%, are water.

Portions of the Muskegon River flow across the northeast and southeast corners of Holland Township.

== Demographics ==
Historical population
Census	Pop.	Note	%±
1920	328		—
1930	221		−32.6%
1940	173		−21.7%
1950	139		−19.7%
1960	80		−42.4%
1970	92		15.0%
1980	159		72.8%
1990	169		6.3%
2000	223		32.0%
2010	248		11.2%
2020	221		−10.9%
U.S. Decennial Census

As of the census of 2000, there were 223 people, 95 households, and 68 families residing in the township. The population density was 6.2 per square mile (2.4/km^{2}). There were 264 housing units at an average density of 7.4 per square mile (2.9/km^{2}). The racial makeup of the township was 99.55% White, and 0.45% from two or more races. Hispanic or Latino of any race were 1.35% of the population.

There were 95 households, out of which 25.3% had children under the age of 18 living with them, 65.3% were married couples living together, 4.2% had a female householder with no husband present, and 27.4% were non-families. 24.2% of all households were made up of individuals, and 13.7% had someone living alone who was 65 years of age or older. The average household size was 2.35 and the average family size was 2.74.

In the township the population was spread out, with 19.7% under the age of 18, 7.2% from 18 to 24, 29.1% from 25 to 44, 26.5% from 45 to 64, and 17.5% who were 65 years of age or older. The median age was 41 years. For every 100 females, there were 104.6 males. For every 100 females age 18 and over, there were 101.1 males.

The median income for a household in the township was $31,000, and the median income for a family was $31,500. Males had a median income of $36,875 versus $20,625 for females. The per capita income for the township was $16,200. About 10.7% of families and 11.9% of the population were below the poverty line, including 15.2% of those under the age of eighteen and 16.3% of those 65 or over.
