= Turkey hunting =

Turkey hunting is a sport involving the pursuit of the elusive wild turkey. Long before the European settlers arrived in North America, the Native Americans took part in hunting wild turkeys.

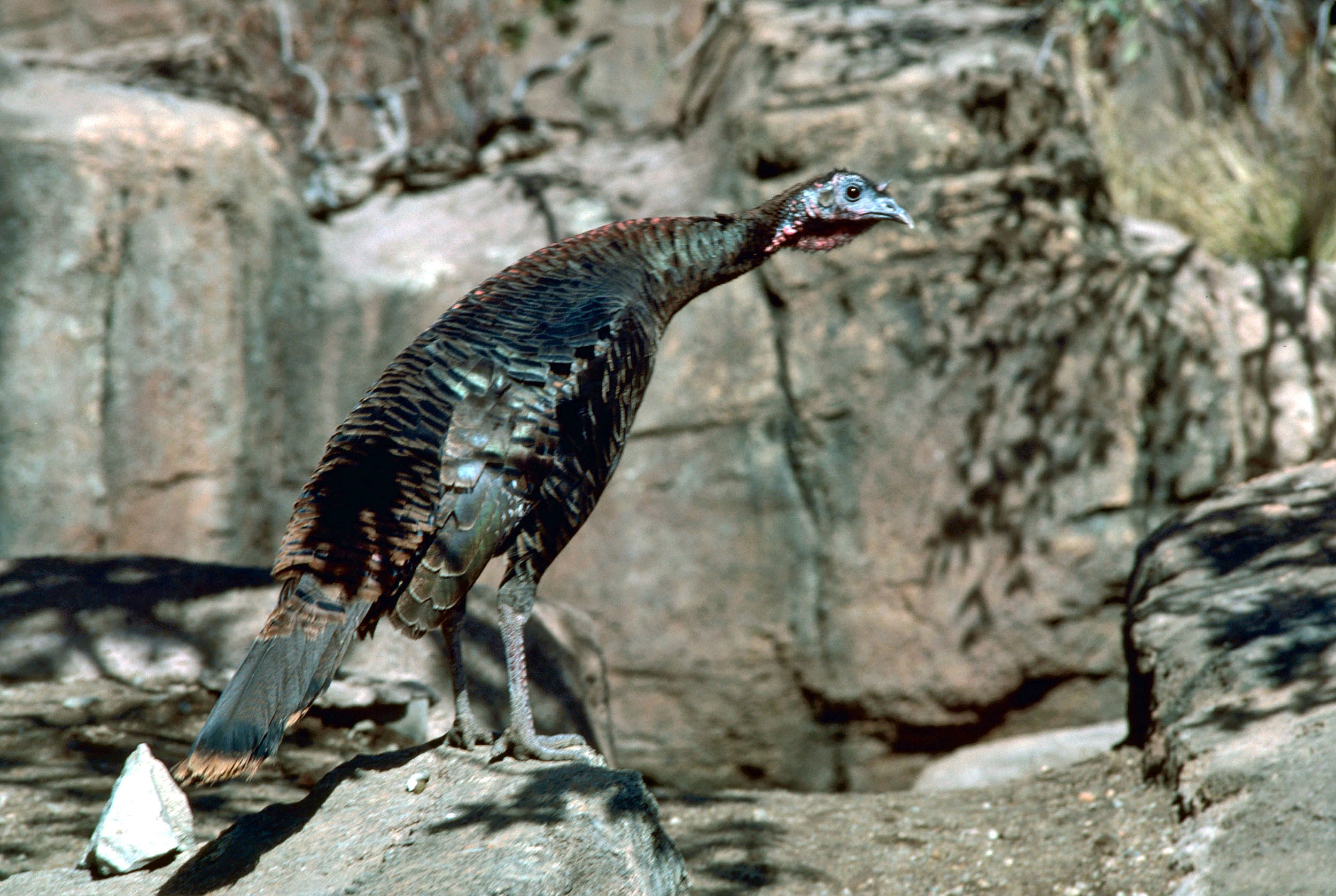
Female (hen) turkey

== History ==
By the early 1900s, the turkey population had been decimated in North America because of habitat destruction, commercial hunting, and a lack of wildlife regulations. Hunters, wildlife agencies and conservation organizations intervened and turkey populations rebounded dramatically. More than 7 million wild turkeys now roam North America, with populations in every U.S. state but Alaska. Wild turkeys are also hunted in parts of Mexico and Canada.

=== Species and subspecies ===
There are two species of turkey pursued as game animals in North America, the wild turkey (Meleagris gallopavo) and the ocellated turkey (Meleagris ocellata). The wild turkey is further divided into six subspecies. To harvest a bird from the Eastern, Osceola, Rio Grande, and Merriam's wild turkey subspecies is known in turkey hunting circles as a "grand slam". Harvesting a bird from all the subspecies in the "grand slam" as well as the Gould's wild turkey subspecies and the ocellated turkey is known as a "world slam".

=== Techniques and equipment ===
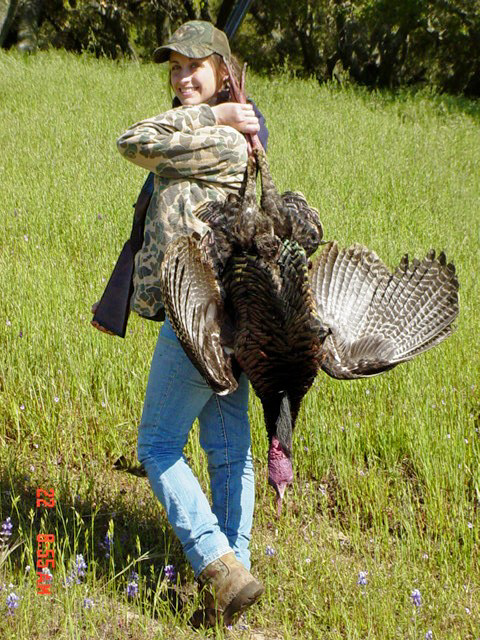
Woman carrying a dead turkey after a hunt in California

Depending on local rules and regulations, the wild turkey is hunted either in the spring or fall. Spring hunts target gobblers (male turkeys) and fall hunts usually target either sex. Spring hunting coincides with the wild turkey mating season, where gobblers can be called into gun range with calls that mimic the sounds of a hen. Fall seasons occur when turkeys are in flocks, and the typical fall hunt strategy is to "bust up" or "scatter" a flock of turkeys, and then use turkey calls to encourage the scattered birds to group back up together.

Scent control contributes to the turkey hunter's technique. While artificial or synthetic scents like those used by hunters of deer and other game are not typically utilized while hunting turkey, removal or masking of foreign scents from the hunter and their equipment is a technique which is commonly used.

== See also ==
- Hunting
- Wild turkey
