= Pere Marquette State Forest =

State Forest in Michigan, US

- IUCN category V (protected landscape/seascape)
- Map showing state forests in Michigan
- Interactive map of Pere Marquette State Forest
- Location: Lower Peninsula, Michigan
- Coordinates: 44.05°N 85.78°W
- Area: 5,860.50 acres (2,371.66 ha)
- Governing body: Michigan Department of Natural Resources
- Website: www.michigan.gov/dnr/managing-resources/forestry

The Pere Marquette State Forest encompasses 5,860.50 acres (2,371.66 ha) in the northern Lower Peninsula of Michigan, United States, on the western side of the state. Counties within the Pere Marquette are: Leelanau, Benzie, Grand Traverse, Kalkaska, Manistee, Wexford, Missaukee, Mason, Lake, Osceola, Oceana, Newaygo and Mecosta.

There are several trail-ways in the Pere Marquette, the longest of which are the Muncie Lake Pathway, at 11.5 miles (18.5 km) in length; the VASA Pathway, at 16.7 miles (26.9 km); and the Cadillac Pathway, at 11.3 miles (18.2 km). The trails are well suited to biking, hiking and cross country skiing.

The North Country Trail includes 65 miles (105 km) within the Pere Marquette, and over 1,500 miles (2,400 km) in Michigan as a whole.

It is named after French explorer Jacques Marquette, who founded the first European settlement of Michigan in 1668.
