= Newton Airport (disambiguation) =

Newton Airport may refer to:

- Newton Airport (New Jersey), in Newton, New Jersey, United States (FAA: 3N5)
- Newton City/County Airport in Newton, Kansas, United States (FAA: EWK)
- Newton Field, in Jackman, Maine, United States (FAA: 59B)
- Newton Municipal Airport (Iowa), in Newton, Iowa, United States (FAA: TNU)
- Newton Municipal Airport (Texas), in Newton, Texas, United States (FAA: 61R)

== See also ==
- Newton Municipal Airport (disambiguation)
