= Cadillac and Lake City Railway =

Railway in the United States

Cadillac and Lake City Railroad
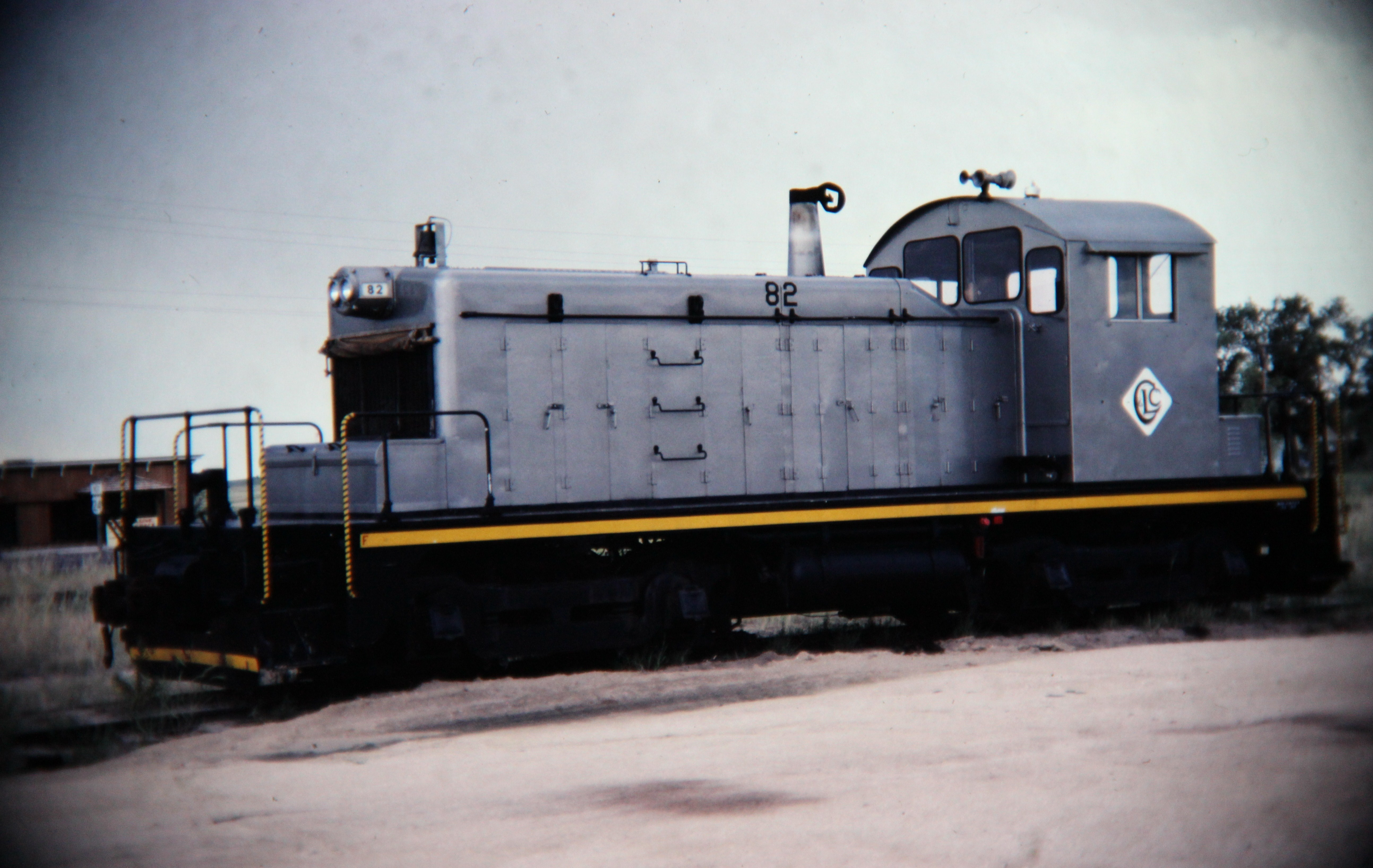
- CLK's EMD SW1 diesel locomotive #82

Overview
- Headquarters: Colorado Springs, CO
- Reporting mark: CLK
- Locale: Colorado, Kansas, Michigan
- Dates of operation: 1964–1988
- Successor: Kyle Railroad

Technical
- Track gauge: 4 ft 8 1/2 in (1,435 mm) standard gauge

The Cadillac & Lake City Railway (reporting mark CLK) was a railroad which operated in the Midwestern United States. The operation was owned by Western States Properties, Inc. and several investors who operated lines in three states; Colorado, Kansas, and Michigan during its time.

== Michigan operations ==
The Cadillac & Lake City Railway began operations in 1964 over former Pennsylvania Railroad (PRR), ex:Grand Rapids and Indiana Railroad (GR&I) trackage between its namesake cities of Cadillac, Michigan, and Lake City, Michigan, 21 miles (34 km). The actual terminus for the Cadillac, Michigan end of the operation was at Missaukee Junction, Michigan, 1 mile north of Haring, Michigan where Ephraim Shay had a residence during the development of the Shay locomotive and just over 2 miles north of Cadillac, Michigan. It was here that all traffic was transferred to and from the Pennsylvania Railroad (PRR); prior to the 1968 merger of the PRR with the New York Central (NYC); thence becoming the Penn Central (PC). All operations ceased in 1971, with the entire Michigan operation abandoned in September 1984 and all rail since removed.

== Colorado and Kansas Operations ==
In 1980, CLK started serving freight customers on industrial trackage in Denver's Airlawn Industrial Park.

In July 1981, the Cadillac & Lake City Railway began operations over a former portion of the Chicago, Rock Island and Pacific Railroad between Simla through Limon, Colorado, to Colby, Kansas, about 171 miles (275 km). The CLK also had trackage rights via the Union Pacific Railroad from Limon to Denver, 84 miles (135 km), but rarely exercised them.

Power for the CLK trains consisted of former Burlington Northern Railroad EMD F units, and Union Pacific Railroad GP7s, and former Colorado & Wyoming switchers at Colorado Springs and Denver.

In May 1984, the Limon to Colby operations were turned over to the Kyle Railroad. Operations of the CLK then consisted of Cimarron Hills in Colorado Springs to Limon, about 69 miles (111 km) of trackage. Power consisted of two Cleburne, Texas, rebuilt CF7s, one EMD SW1, and an ex-CMStP&P GP20. All of the Cadillac & Lake City's rail operations have since ceased with most of the tracks between Powers Boulevard (in Colorado Springs) to the Wye in Limon, Colorado being removed in 1993. There is still (2008) a lot of evidence of the former railroad simply left to rot away. Items such as an old box car just west of Marksheffel road in Colorado Springs, many telegraph poles, insulators strewn about near the old line, and the old raised grade are a common sight on the 70-mile (110 km) route. A depot remains in Calhan, CO in deteriorating but rather good shape. East of Matheson, CO, a long trestle remains, where the line crosses Big Sandy Creek.

Originally Milwaukee road GP9 #2405, this unit rebuilt to GP20m and relettered for the C&LC is seen near Limon, CO in September 1984.
