= Shay Locomotive (Cadillac, Michigan) =

- U.S. National Register of Historic Places
- Michigan State Historic Site
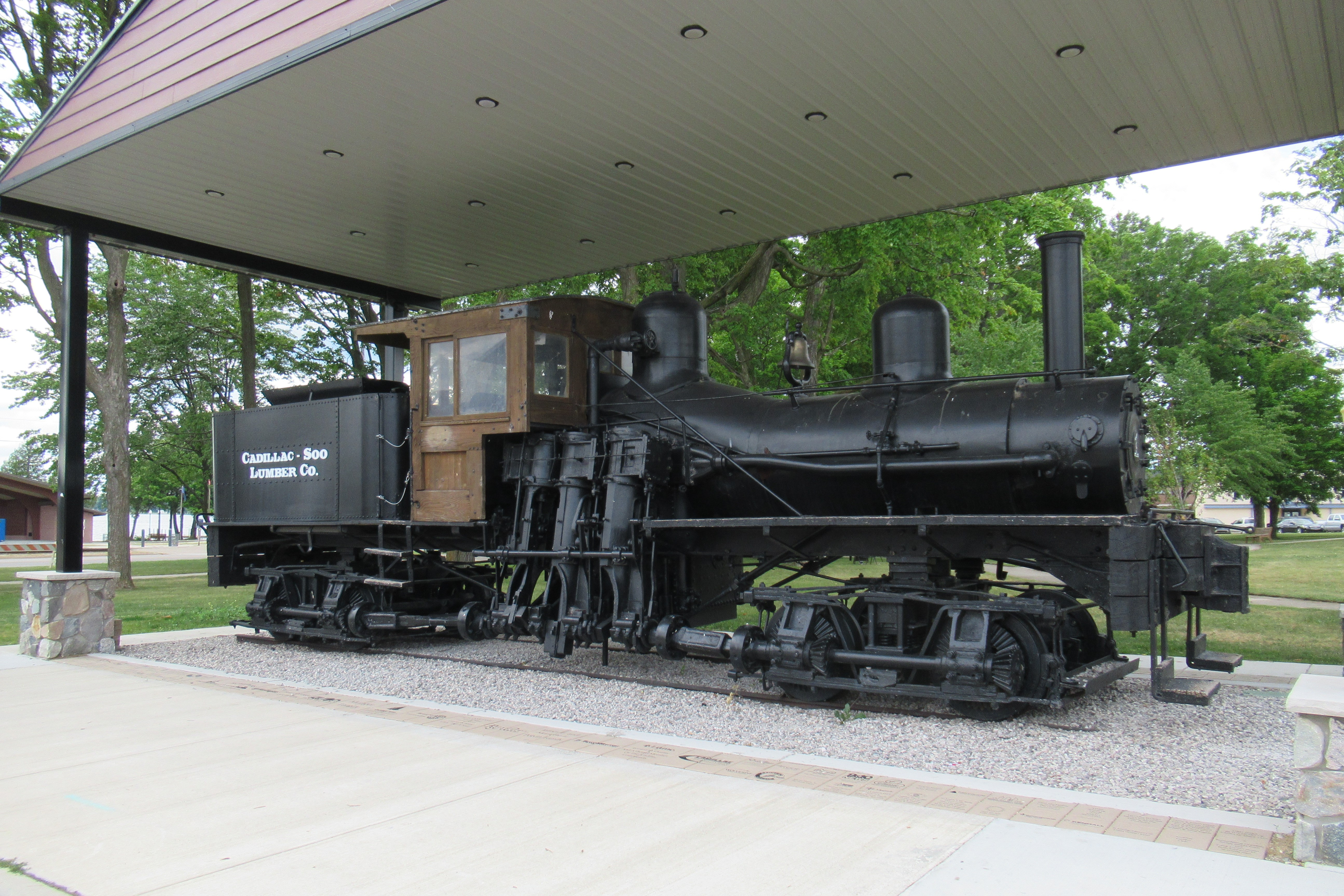

- Location within Michigan Location within the United States
- Interactive map
- Location: Cass St., Cadillac, Michigan
- Coordinates: 44°14′41″N 85°23′56″W
- Area: less than one acre
- Built: 1898
- Built by: Lima Locomotive Works
- Architect: Ephraim Shay
- Architectural style: Shay locomotive #549
- NRHP reference No.: 81000321

Significant dates
- Added to NRHP: October 26, 1981
- Designated MSHS: August 3, 1979

The Shay Logging Locomotive is a standard gauge Shay locomotive engine located on Cass Street in City Park in Cadillac, Michigan. It was designated a Michigan State Historic Site in 1979 and listed on the National Register of Historic Places in 1981.

== History ==
Ephraim Shay was a logger from Haring, Michigan, near Cadillac. Shay was in the logging industry, and realized that a method of moving logs when the ground was muddy and damp would increase productivity immensely. He experimented with horse-drawn trams with limited success, then hit on the idea of building temporary rail lines. In 1879, Shay invented a type of steam powered locomotive specifically for use in the logging industry. This Shay locomotive was small and powerful, and was geared to operate on tracks with steep grades and articulated to handle sharp curves. Shay patented the locomotive in 1881.

This Shay locomotive was constructed in 1898 by the Lima Locomotive Works for the Boyne City Southeastern Railroad Company. In 1918, it was sold to Michigan Forest Products in Strongs, Michigan, and then, in 1924, to William L. Saunders, President of the Cadillac Lumber & Chemical Company, later called the Cadillac-Soo Lumber Company, for service in Sault Sainte Marie, Michigan. It was used there until 1954, when T. Walter Kelly, Mayor of Cadillac and Saunders' son-in-law, obtained it from the Cadillac-Soo Lumber Company and donated the locomotive to the city of Cadillac. It was partially restored in 1964, and further restored in 1985. It now serves as a tourist attraction in Cadillac's City Park.

== Gallery ==
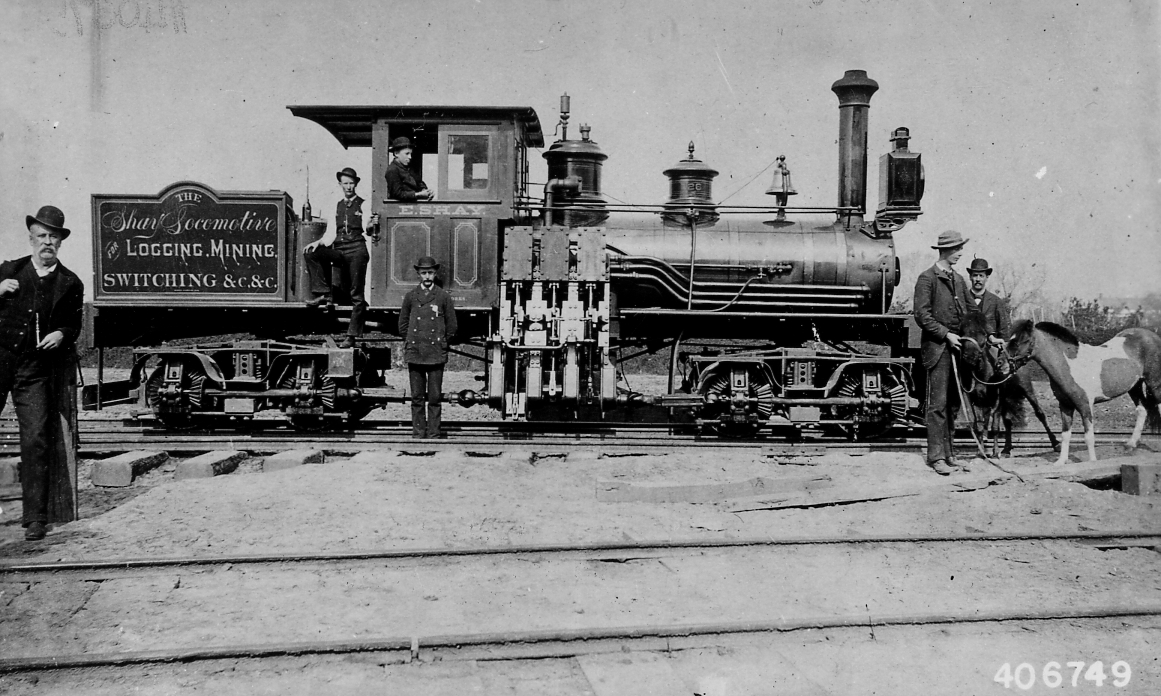
Historic image of the locomotive in 1904

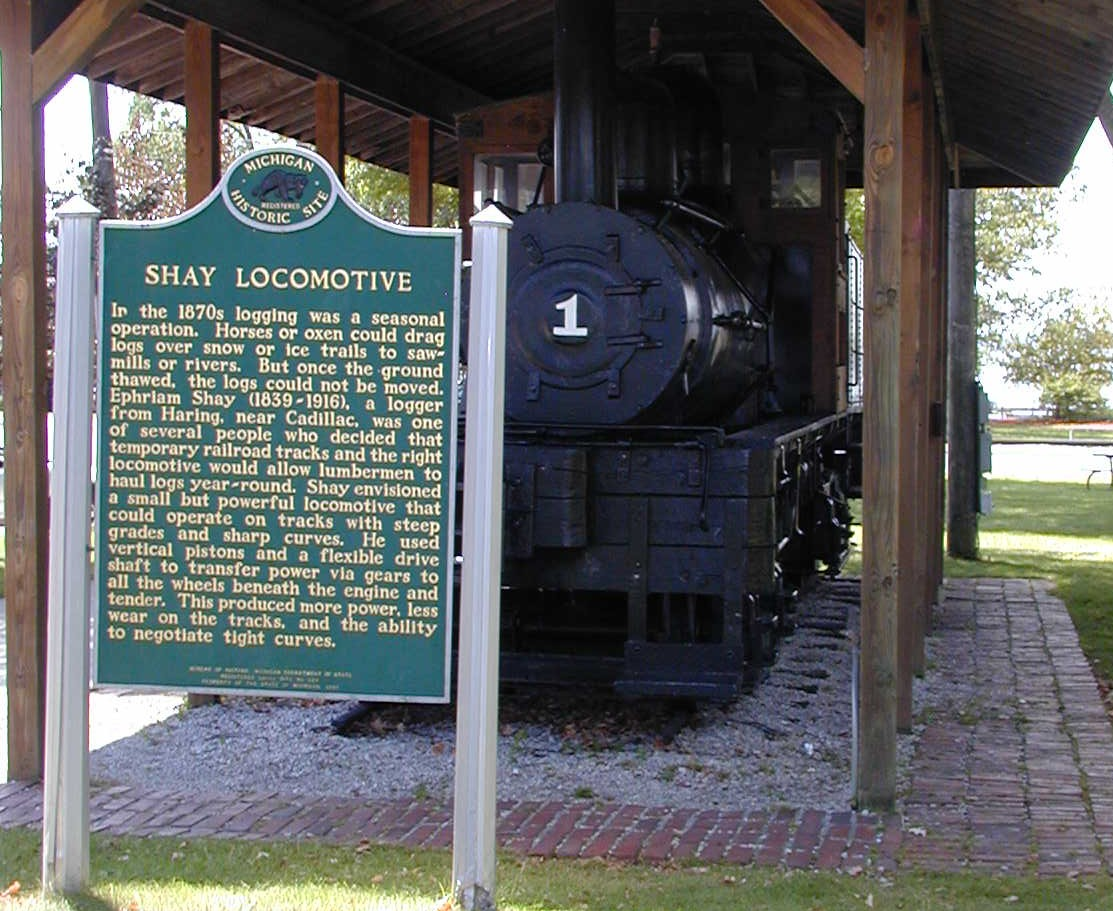
Shay Locomotive with its historic marker

== Description ==
The Shay Logging Locomotive is a Class B steam-powered Shay locomotive designated number 549. It is powered by three 10 inches (250 mm) bore, 12 inches (300 mm) stroke cylinders. It is 35 feet (11 m) in length and weighs 45 tons
