= Harbor Springs Railway =

Narrow-gauge railway in Michigan

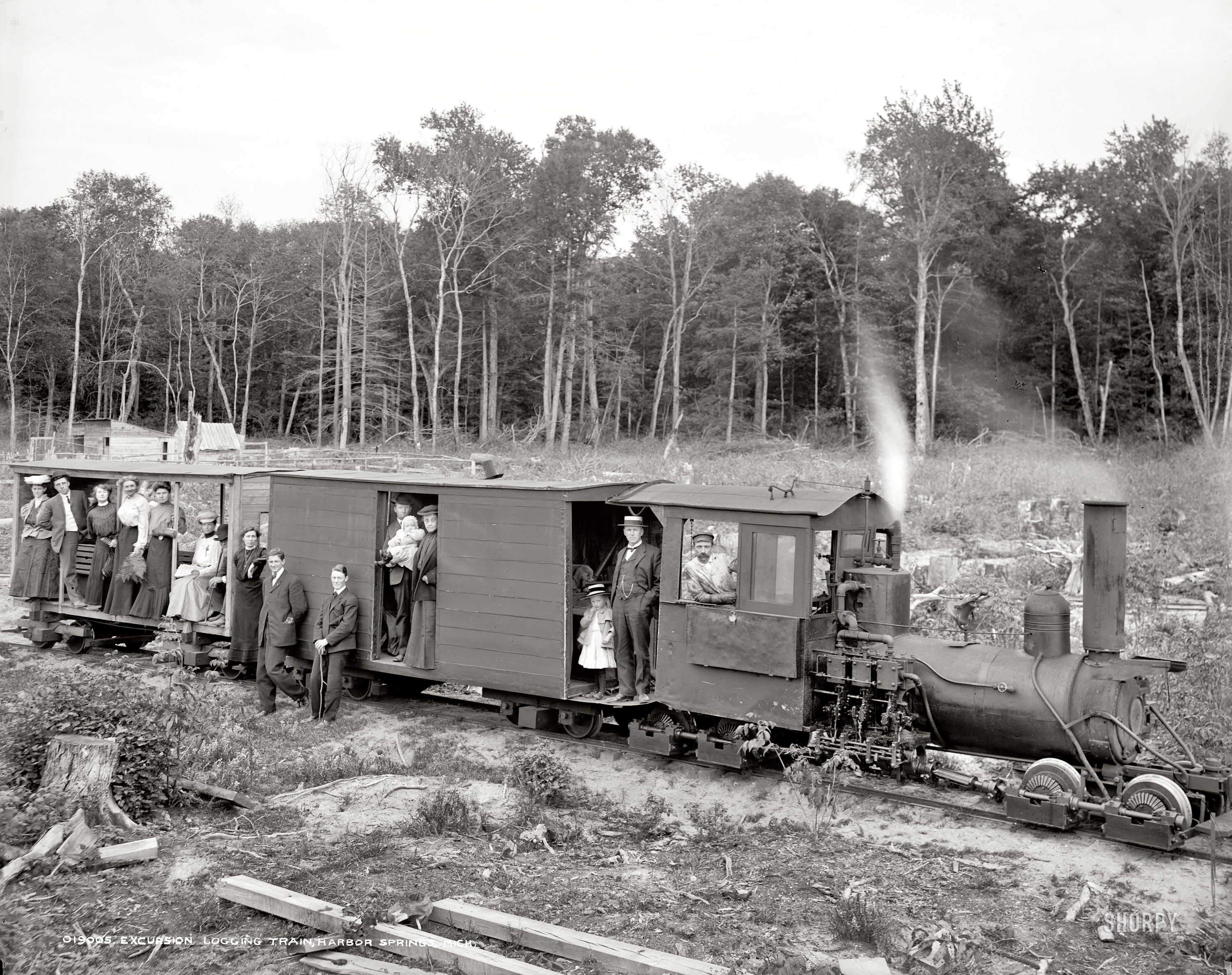
Harbor Springs #1, a frameless geared locomotive built by Ephraim Shay.

The Harbor Springs Railway was a 2 ft 6 in (762 mm) narrow-gauge railway built at Harbor Springs, Michigan, on Little Traverse Bay on Lake Michigan. It was nicknamed the Hemlock Central because of the great numbers of hemlock trees growing in the area. The railway was chartered by Ephraim Shay, the inventor of the Shay locomotive, on February 2, 1902, but may have started construction as early as December 10, 1900. (Note: Graydon Meints puts the incorporation date in 1900, while Hilton places in 1902.Hilton (1990), p. 421 A report by the Michigan State Tax Commission, dated 1901, refers to the Harbor Springs as an "unincorporated railway" with 4 miles (6.4 km) of track.)

== History ==
It was primarily a lumber-hauling operation, although summer vacationing tourists were carried for a fare of 25¢. It originally operated a route of seven miles (11 km) to Stutsman and Race Mill; it was extended a mile to Carter's Mill in 1904. Small temporary branches were also constructed as well as the moving of the right of way when logging operations moved, as was typical for a logging railroad.

The line was laid with very light rail of 16 pounds per yard (7.9 kg/m) and worked by three locomotives built by the railroad to the design of its president and general manager, Ephraim Shay. They were geared locomotives of the typical Shay pattern but were unusual in that they had no frames, the boiler being the main structural component. The line was built and funded without debt (thanks to Shay's royalties and licenses from his locomotive designs), and by 1906 the investment in physical plant was estimated at $51,346 (equivalent to $1.31 million in 2023).

The line ceased operations in 1910 and was dismantled in 1912. The company dissolved on January 17, 1912. (Note: Meints asserts that abandonment occurred in 1910, while Hilton places it in "about 1911". Both agree that the company dissolved in 1912.)
