= TNU =

TNU may refer to:

- Tajik National University
- Tavrida National V.I. Vernadsky University, Ukraine
- Televisión Nacional Uruguay
- Tianjin Normal University, China
- Thái Nguyên University, Vietnam
- Trevecca Nazarene University, United States
- Tungnan University, Taiwan
- Newton Municipal Airport (Iowa), with IATA, FAA LIT codes:TNU
- Terrestrial Neutrino Units, a measurement of geoneutrinos
