= Jackman, Maine =

Town in Maine, United States

- Town
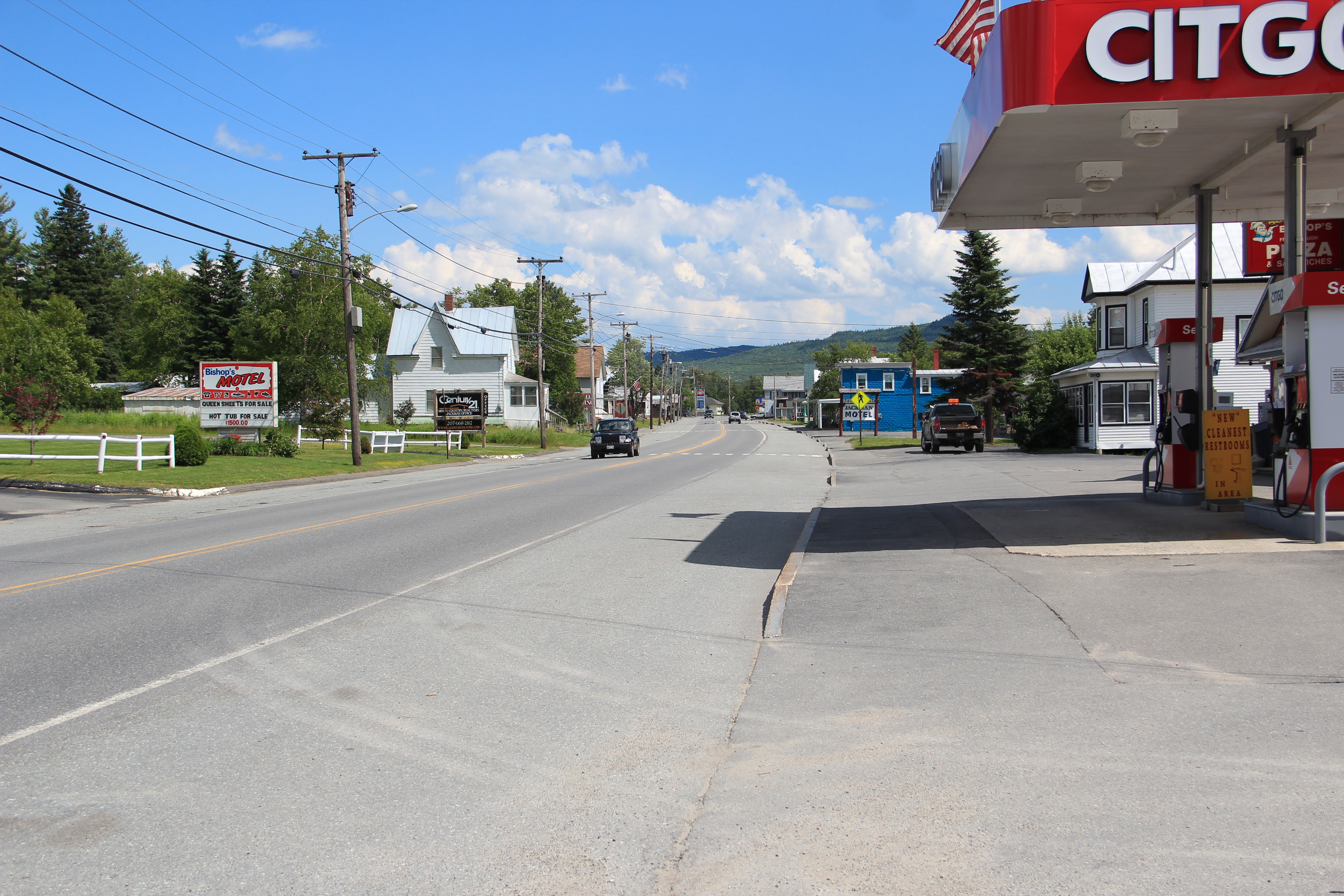
- Street scene in Jackman

- Logo
- Nickname: Switzerland Of Maine
- Location within Maine Location within the United States
- Coordinates: 45°36′30″N 70°11′23″W
- Country: United States
- State: Maine
- County: Somerset
- Incorporated: 1895

Area
  - Total: 42.42 sq mi (109.87 km^{2})
  - Land: 41.26 sq mi (106.86 km^{2})
  - Water: 1.16 sq mi (3.00 km^{2})
- Elevation: 1,673 ft (510 m)

Population (2020)
  - Total: 783
  - Density: 19/sq mi (7.3/km^{2})
- Time zone: UTC-5 (Eastern (EST))
  - Summer (DST): UTC-4 (EDT)
- ZIP code: 04945
- Area code: 207
- FIPS code: 23-35345
- GNIS feature ID: 582532
- Website: jackmanme.net

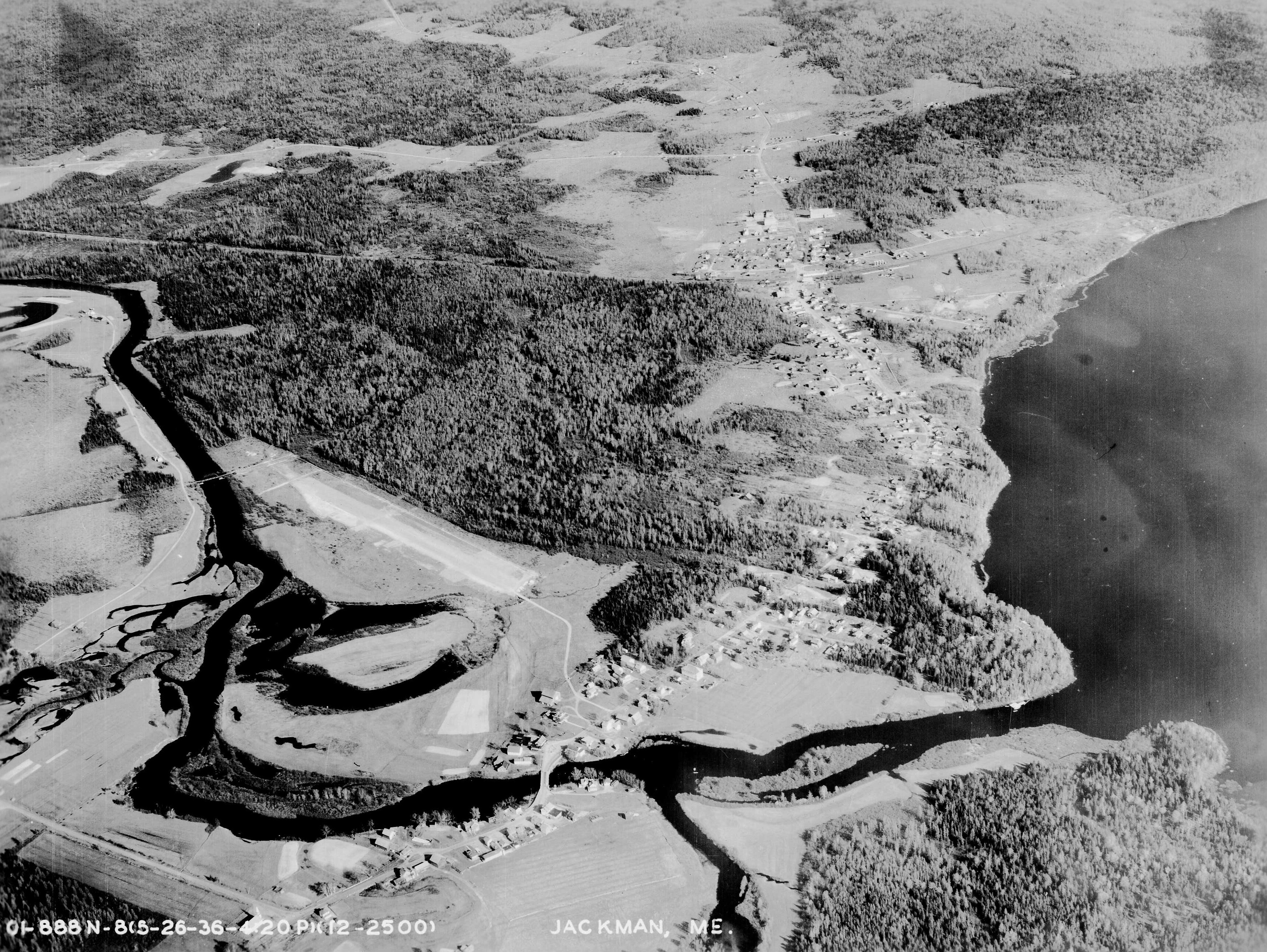
Jackman in 1936

Jackman is a town in Somerset County, Maine, United States. The population was 783 at the 2020 census.

== Geography ==
According to the United States Census Bureau, the town has a total area of 42.42 square miles (109.87 km^{2}), of which 41.26 square miles (106.86 km^{2}) is land and 1.16 square miles (3.00 km^{2}) is water.

== History ==
Jackman was named after Captain James Jackman, who was hired by the State of Maine in the 1830s to build the road connecting the United States with Canada.

On April 8, 2024, Jackman was on the path of totality for a total eclipse of the sun. The eclipse was to sweep across most of the United States, but as the date approached, cloudy skies were forecast for most of that path. However, Jackman was expected to have clear skies that day, so the town of less than a thousand residents was inundated by more than 10,000 visitors from across the country. Officials said it was probably the largest crowd ever seen in Jackman.

== Climate ==
This climatic region is typified by large seasonal temperature differences, with only warm (but not hot) summers and cold (sometimes severely cold) winters. According to the Köppen Climate Classification system, Jackman has a humid continental or "hemiboreal" climate (due its lack of true summer heat), abbreviated "Dfb" (or sometimes "Dbf") on climate maps, as does all of Maine.

Climate data for Jackman, Maine, 1991–2020 normals, extremes 1897–present
Month	Jan	Feb	Mar	Apr	May	Jun	Jul	Aug	Sep	Oct	Nov	Dec	Year
Record high °F (°C)	58 (14)	65 (18)	75 (24)	81 (27)	97 (36)	95 (35)	102 (39)	97 (36)	92 (33)	83 (28)	73 (23)	64 (18)	102 (39)
Mean maximum °F (°C)	44.5 (6.9)	46.3 (7.9)	54.6 (12.6)	68.4 (20.2)	80.6 (27.0)	86.4 (30.2)	86.8 (30.4)	85.7 (29.8)	82.3 (27.9)	72.3 (22.4)	60.5 (15.8)	48.3 (9.1)	89.4 (31.9)
Mean daily maximum °F (°C)	22.4 (−5.3)	25.7 (−3.5)	35.3 (1.8)	48.1 (8.9)	63.0 (17.2)	72.0 (22.2)	76.5 (24.7)	75.8 (24.3)	68.6 (20.3)	53.9 (12.2)	40.8 (4.9)	28.6 (−1.9)	50.9 (10.5)
Daily mean °F (°C)	11.2 (−11.6)	13.1 (−10.5)	22.9 (−5.1)	36.4 (2.4)	50.0 (10.0)	59.8 (15.4)	64.8 (18.2)	63.4 (17.4)	55.6 (13.1)	43.1 (6.2)	31.5 (−0.3)	19.1 (−7.2)	39.2 (4.0)
Mean daily minimum °F (°C)	0.0 (−17.8)	0.4 (−17.6)	10.5 (−11.9)	24.8 (−4.0)	36.9 (2.7)	47.5 (8.6)	53.1 (11.7)	50.9 (10.5)	42.5 (5.8)	32.4 (0.2)	22.3 (−5.4)	9.6 (−12.4)	27.6 (−2.5)
Mean minimum °F (°C)	−21.3 (−29.6)	−19.6 (−28.7)	−13.0 (−25.0)	11.4 (−11.4)	26.3 (−3.2)	35.1 (1.7)	42.5 (5.8)	39.2 (4.0)	29.9 (−1.2)	20.7 (−6.3)	4.8 (−15.1)	−12.2 (−24.6)	−24.9 (−31.6)
Record low °F (°C)	−38 (−39)	−44 (−42)	−30 (−34)	−9 (−23)	14 (−10)	28 (−2)	30 (−1)	25 (−4)	17 (−8)	11 (−12)	−15 (−26)	−33 (−36)	−44 (−42)
Average precipitation inches (mm)	2.54 (65)	2.31 (59)	2.56 (65)	3.25 (83)	3.67 (93)	4.64 (118)	4.57 (116)	4.00 (102)	3.46 (88)	4.28 (109)	3.07 (78)	3.42 (87)	41.77 (1,063)
Average snowfall inches (cm)	21.5 (55)	25.2 (64)	19.4 (49)	7.6 (19)	0.2 (0.51)	0.0 (0.0)	0.0 (0.0)	0.0 (0.0)	0.0 (0.0)	1.6 (4.1)	7.2 (18)	24.2 (61)	106.9 (270.61)
Average extreme snow depth inches (cm)	21.8 (55)	30.7 (78)	30.6 (78)	15.1 (38)	0.2 (0.51)	0.0 (0.0)	0.0 (0.0)	0.0 (0.0)	0.0 (0.0)	1.2 (3.0)	5.2 (13)	16.0 (41)	36.5 (93)
Average precipitation days (≥ 0.01 in)	12.0	10.4	10.9	12.1	13.5	13.6	14.0	12.6	10.5	13.8	12.5	14.8	150.7
Average snowy days (≥ 0.1 in)	8.2	8.2	6.8	2.7	0.2	0.0	0.0	0.0	0.0	0.8	3.9	9.3	40.1
Source 1: NOAA
Source 2: National Weather Service

== Demographics ==
Historical population
Census	Pop.	Note	%±
1840	10		—
1850	12		20.0%
1870	65		—
1880	95		46.2%
1890	217		128.4%
1900	352		62.2%
1910	667		89.5%
1920	902		35.2%
1930	1,099		21.8%
1940	1,069		−2.7%
1950	964		−9.8%
1960	984		2.1%
1970	848		−13.8%
1980	1,003		18.3%
1990	920		−8.3%
2000	718		−22.0%
2010	862		20.1%
2020	783		−9.2%
U.S. Decennial Census

=== 2010 census ===
As of the census of 2010, there were 862 people, 383 households, and 228 families living in the town. The population density was 20.9 inhabitants per square mile (8.1/km^{2}). There were 726 housing units at an average density of 17.6 per square mile (6.8/km^{2}). The racial makeup of the town was 96.4% White, 0.1% African American, 1.0% Native American, 0.6% Asian, 0.1% from other races, and 1.7% from two or more races. Hispanic or Latino of any race were 1.7% of the population.

There were 383 households, of which 23.0% had children under the age of 18 living with them, 51.2% were married couples living together, 6.3% had a female householder with no husband present, 2.1% had a male householder with no wife present, and 40.5% were non-families. 32.1% of all households were made up of individuals, and 12% had someone living alone who was 65 years of age or older. The average household size was 2.19 and the average family size was 2.78.

The median age in the town was 44.8 years. 19.5% of residents were under the age of 18; 5.8% were between the ages of 18 and 24; 25.1% were from 25 to 44; 32.1% were from 45 to 64; and 17.5% were 65 years of age or older. The gender makeup of the town was 49.3% male and 50.7% female.

=== 2000 census ===
As of the census of 2000, there were 718 people, 310 households, and 190 families living in the town. The population density was 17.5 inhabitants per square mile (6.8/km^{2}). There were 585 housing units at an average density of 14.3 per square mile (5.5/km^{2}). The racial makeup of the town was 98.75% White, 0.14% African American, 0.56% Native American, 0.56% from other races. Hispanic or Latino of any race were 1.81% of the population.

There were 310 households, out of which 33.5% had children under the age of 18 living with them, 46.8% were married couples living together, 9.4% had a female householder with no husband present, and 38.4% were non-families. 31.9% of all households were made up of individuals, and 15.5% had someone living alone who was 65 years of age or older. The average household size was 2.25 and the average family size was 2.84.

In the town, the population was spread out, with 25.8% under the age of 18, 5.3% from 18 to 24, 29.2% from 25 to 44, 25.1% from 45 to 64, and 14.6% who were 65 years of age or older. The median age was 40 years. For every 100 females, there were 96.2 males. For every 100 females age 18 and over, there were 92.4 males.

The median income for a household in the town was $29,615, and the median income for a family was $33,182. Males had a median income of $29,135 versus $21,310 for females. The per capita income for the town was $15,763. About 3.7% of families and 9.5% of the population were below the poverty line, including 16.0% of those under age 18 and 13.2% of those age 65 or over.

== Education ==
Jackman is part of Forest Hills Consolidated School, which teaches grades kindergarten to grade 12.

Jackman belongs to Maine Area School District 12.

== Transportation ==
Newton Field is a small airport located in the northwest part of the town.

US 201 runs through Jackman, connecting the town with larger cities such as Waterville and Augusta. SR 6 also runs through the town.

== Sports ==
Forest Hills Consolidated School offers six varsity high school sports: golf, cross country, baseball, softball, and boys and girls basketball.

Pommerlo Memorial Park contains an outdoor basketball court and tennis court.

== Railroad history ==
Jackman became connected to the international North American rail network upon completion of the International Railway of Maine division of the transcontinental Canadian Pacific Railway in 1889. Jackman Lumber Company built the Bald Mountain Railroad in 1915 north from Jackman up Heald Stream and across the South Branch Penobscot River into Moose River Plantation. This logging railroad brought logs to the Jackman sawmill until 1926. Passenger rail service through Jackman ended in 1981, resumed in 1985, and ended once more in 1994.

=== Jackman Lumber Company locomotives ===
Number	Builder	Type	Date	Works number	Notes
	Lima Locomotive Works	Shay locomotive	March 24, 1894	464	originally Keystone Railroad #2 of Pennsylvania; purchased from Lye Brook Railroad of Manchester, Vermont
	Lima Locomotive Works	Shay locomotive	June 26, 1908	1970	originally Beebe River Railroad #2 of Campton, New Hampshire
	Lima Locomotive Works	Shay locomotive	November 11, 1907	2036	originally Johnson Lumber Company #3 of North Woodstock, New Hampshire

== See also ==
- Armstrong–Jackman Border Crossing
