= Newton Municipal Airport =

Newton Municipal Airport may refer to:

- Newton Municipal Airport (Iowa), in Newton, Iowa, United States (FAA: TNU)
- Newton Municipal Airport (Texas), in Newton, Texas, United States (FAA: 61R)
