= Cimarron Hills, Colorado =

Census-designated place in Colorado, US

- Census-designated place
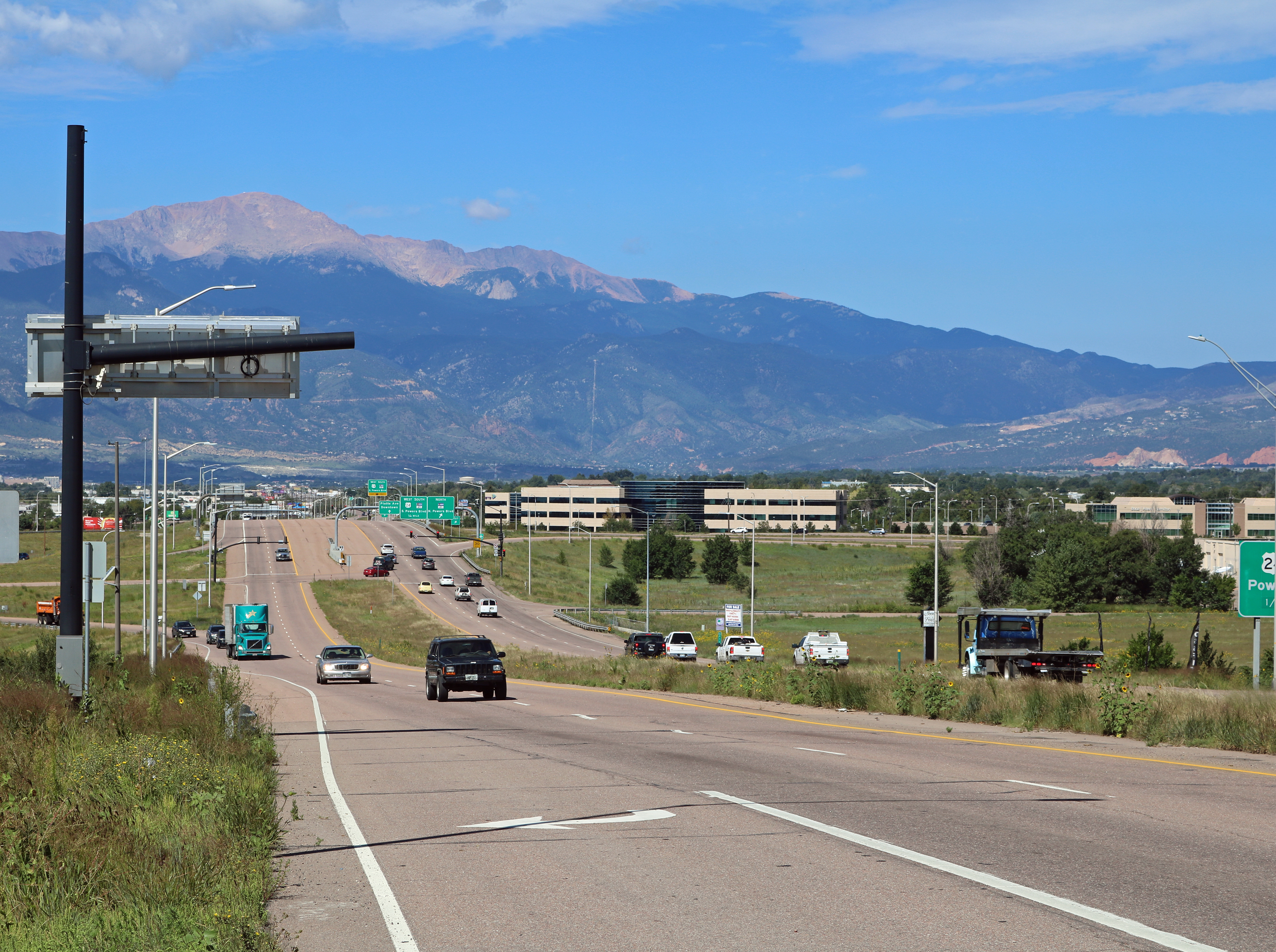
- Looking west along East Platte Avenue in Cimarron Hills.

- Location of the Cimarron Hills CDP in El Paso County, Colorado
- Coordinates: 38°52′23″N 104°41′32″W
- Country: United States
- State: Colorado
- County: El Paso

Government
  - Type: Unincorporated community
  - Body: El Paso County

Area
  - Total: 5.942 sq mi (15.391 km^{2})
  - Land: 5.939 sq mi (15.382 km^{2})
  - Water: 0.0035 sq mi (0.009 km^{2})
- Elevation: 6,447 ft (1,965 m)

Population (2020)
  - Total: 19,311
  - Density: 3,251.5/sq mi (1,255.4/km^{2})
- Time zone: UTC−07:00 (MST)
  - Summer (DST): UTC−06:00 (MDT)
- ZIP code: Colorado Springs 80914, 80915, and 80922
- Area code: 719
- GNIS CDP ID: 2407622
- FIPS code: FIPS 08 14587

Cimarron Hills is an unincorporated community and a census-designated place located in and governed by El Paso County, Colorado, United States. Cimarron Hills is an enclave of the City of Colorado Springs. The CDP is a part of the Colorado Springs, CO Metropolitan Statistical Area. The population of the Cimarron Hills CDP was 19,311 at the United States Census 2020.

== Geography ==
The Cimarron Hills CDP has an area of 3,803 acres (15.391 km^{2}), including 2.2 acres (0.009 km^{2}) of water.

== Demographics ==
The United States Census Bureau initially defined the Cimarron Hills CDP for the 1980 United States census.

=== 2020 census ===
As of the 2020 census, Cimarron Hills had a population of 19,311. The median age was 33.4 years. 25.5% of residents were under the age of 18 and 10.8% of residents were 65 years of age or older. For every 100 females there were 98.8 males, and for every 100 females age 18 and over there were 97.9 males age 18 and over.

100.0% of residents lived in urban areas, while 0.0% lived in rural areas.

There were 7,070 households in Cimarron Hills, of which 36.7% had children under the age of 18 living in them. Of all households, 49.2% were married-couple households, 19.1% were households with a male householder and no spouse or partner present, and 23.7% were households with a female householder and no spouse or partner present. About 21.7% of all households were made up of individuals and 6.3% had someone living alone who was 65 years of age or older.

There were 7,316 housing units, of which 3.4% were vacant. The homeowner vacancy rate was 0.9% and the rental vacancy rate was 5.2%.

Racial composition as of the 2020 census
Race	Number	Percent
White	12,235	63.4%
Black or African American	1,443	7.5%
American Indian and Alaska Native	283	1.5%
Asian	630	3.3%
Native Hawaiian and Other Pacific Islander	89	0.5%
Some other race	1,662	8.6%
Two or more races	2,969	15.4%
Hispanic or Latino (of any race)	4,518	23.4%

Cimarron Hills CDP, Colorado
Year	Pop.	±%
1980	6,597	—
1990	11,160	+69.2%
2000	15,194	+36.1%
2010	16,161	+6.4%
2020	19,311	+19.5%
Source: United States Census Bureau

== Transportation ==
Highway: Cimarron Hills is 1.5 miles north of U.S. Highway 24. It is also 9 miles from Interstate 25.

Air: The community is three miles north of the Colorado Springs Airport.

Rail: In 1888, the Chicago, Rock Island and Pacific Railroad began construction of a main line between Limon and Colorado Springs, passing through Cimarron Hills. The Rocky Mountain Rocket provided passenger service from 1939 to 1966. In later years, the Cadillac and Lake City Railway provided service between Cimarron Hills and Limon. Although the tracks were removed in 1993, the railroad grade can still be seen as a prominent U-shape in aerial images of Cimarron Hills.

== Education ==
The CDP is divided between School District 49 to the north (with most of the CDP) and the Colorado Springs School District 11 to the south.

== See also ==
- List of census-designated places in Colorado
