= Shay Hexagon House =

Historic house in Michigan, United States

- Shay Complex
- U.S. National Register of Historic Places
- Michigan State Historic Site
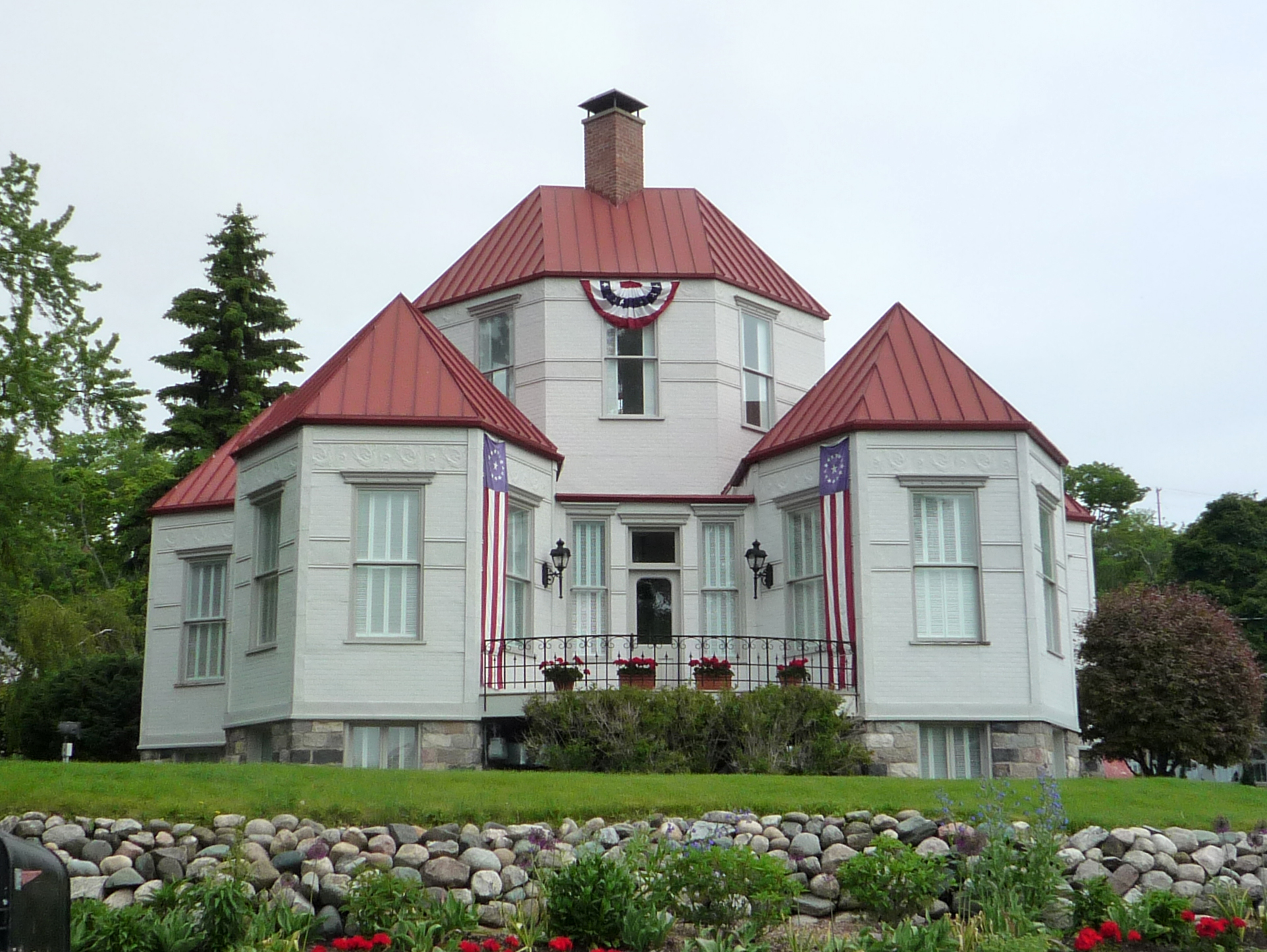
- Shay Hexagon House, 2009

- Location within Michigan Location within the United States
- Interactive map
- Location: Main and Judd Sts., Harbor Springs, Michigan
- Coordinates: 45°25′49″N 84°59′2″W
- Area: 2 acres (0.81 ha)
- Built: 1888
- Architect: Ephraim Shay
- NRHP reference No.: 72000612
- Added to NRHP: November 7, 1972

The Shay Hexagon House is a house located at 396 East Main Street in Harbor Springs, Michigan. It was part of a complex of three buildings (including a machine shop and waterworks, now demolished, located across Judd Street) built by Ephraim Shay. It was placed on the National Register of Historic Places in 1972.

== History ==
Ephraim Shay was born in Ohio in 1839. He moved to Michigan in 1864 and eventually to Harbor Springs in 1888. He was already nationally known as the inventor of the Shay locomotive, typically used in logging applications. On arriving at Harbor Springs, Shay built a hexagonal house for his own use, and a nearby machine shop, where he constructed machines (including some of his eponymous locomotives) and manufacturing tools. About a year after the construction of the machine shop, Shay built a waterworks, which supplied Harbor Springs and Harbor Point with up to 100,000 gallons of water a day. A reservoir was constructed in 1894.

Shay lived in his house until his death in 1916. The house was sold in 1924–25, and housed a series of commercial shops. As of 2017, it is privately owned and has been carefully restored.

Shay sold the waterworks to the city of Harbor Springs in the late 1890s. The machine shop was later used as a city garage, and then as the city Fire Hall. Both buildings have been subsequently demolished, leaving the Hexagon House as the only remaining structure in the complex.

== Description ==
The Shay Complex is composed of three structures: Ephraim Shay's private residence (known as the "Hexagon House"), his machine shop, and the waterworks.

The Hexagon House, located at 396 East Main Street, is sheathed entirely of metal on a foundation of cut stone. The roof, originally of metal sheet, was later covered with asphalt shingles. The sheets of metal used to construct the house were embossed to give the appearance of brick. Interior walls are of pressed steel.

The main body of the house is a two-story hexagon shape, and surrounding the center structure are four single-story hexagonal wings, each one a single room with five windows spaced around the perimeter. The room in the center was used as a sitting room, with the upper floor an observatory. Two main entrance halls lead to the front and rear of the house, and the center room opens onto a parlor, a dining / family room, a kitchen with a bath for the maid, and three bedrooms with two main baths. The interior was originally finished with oil paints in contrasting designs.

The machine shop is located on Judd Street across from the Hexagon. It is a large single-story brick building with a hip roof covered in shingles. Windows are set in segmental arches.

The waterworks is located just east of the machine shop. It has a partial hip roof covered in shingles.

Shay Hexagon House, c. 1990

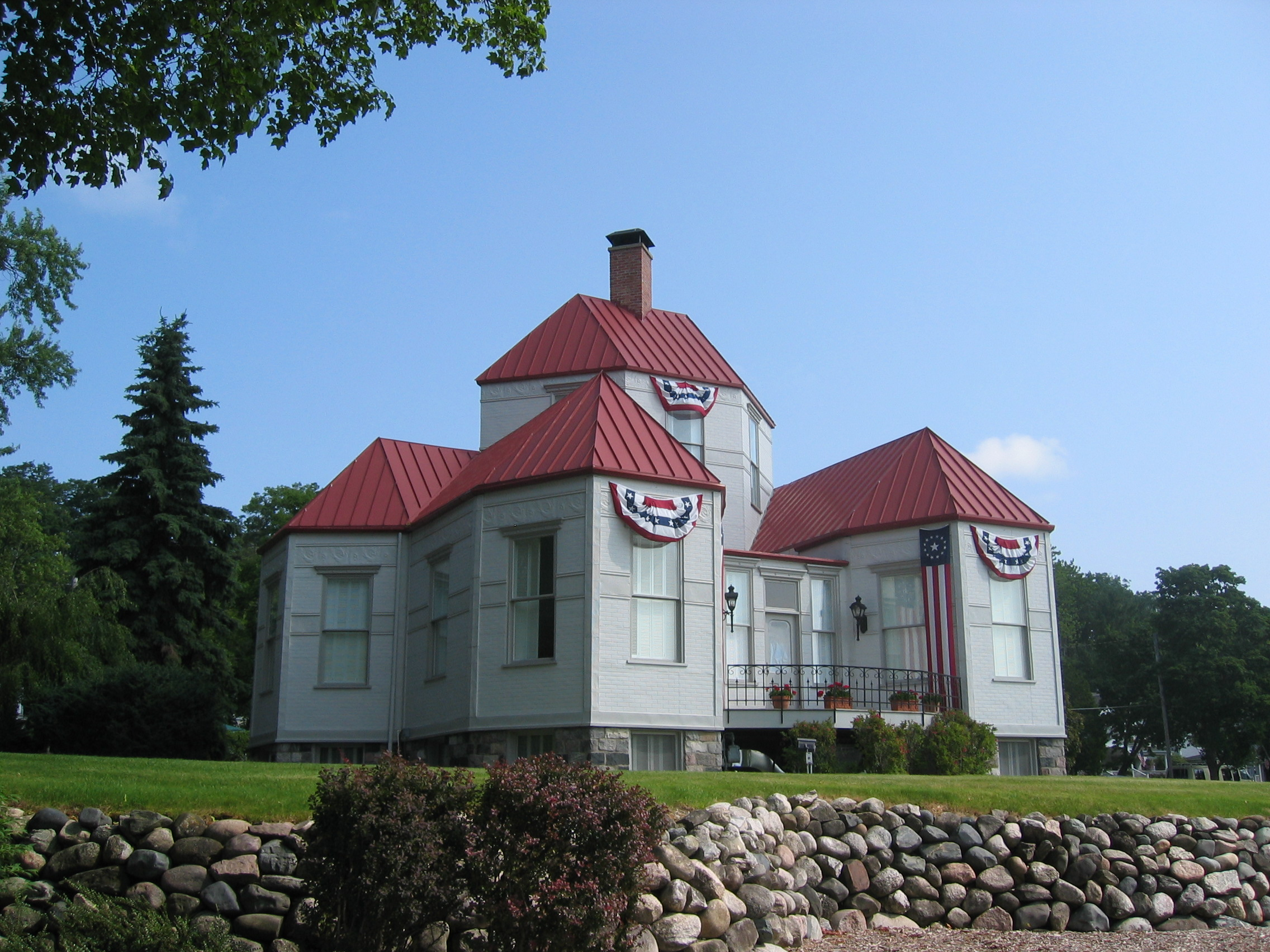
Shay Hexagon House, 2005

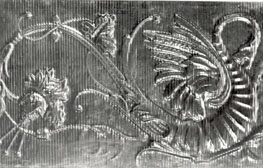
Stamped brick

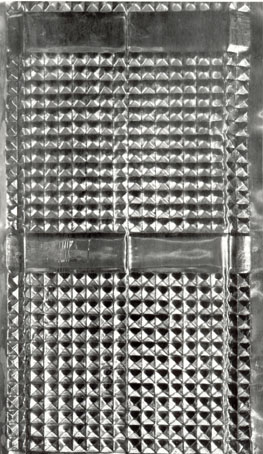
Stamped brick

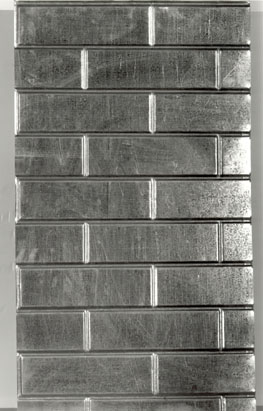
Stamped brick

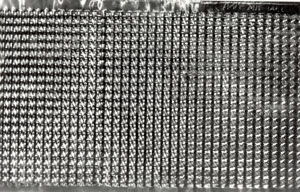
Stamped brick
