= Ephraim Shay =

American railroad engineer and entrepreneur (1839 – 1916)

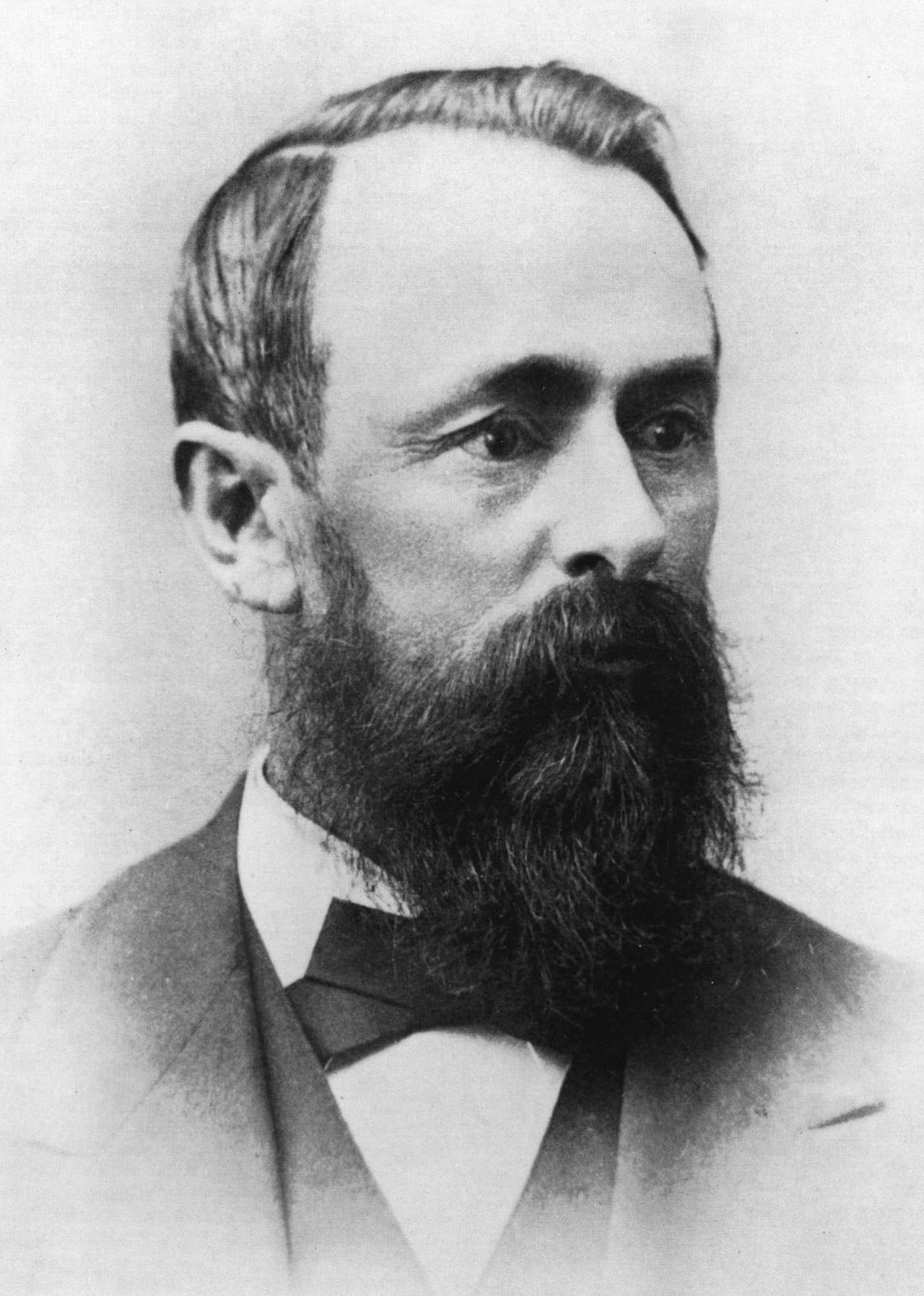
- "Received marching orders. Quite a coincidence; on the day I am 22 years old I start on my first expedition to defend my country's honor and flag." - Ephraim Shay, Civil War Diary
- Born: July 17, 1839; Huron County, Ohio, United States
- Died: April 19, 1916 (aged 76); Harbor Springs, Michigan, United States
- Occupations: Inventor, entrepreneur
- Spouse: Jane Henderson
- Awards: John Scott Award (1892)

Ephraim Shay (July 17, 1839 – April 19, 1916) was an American merchant, entrepreneur and self-taught railroad engineer who worked in the state of Michigan. He designed the Shay locomotive and patented the type. He licensed it for manufacture through what became known as Lima Locomotive Works in Ohio; from 1882 to 1892 some 300 locomotives of this type were sold.

== Early life and military service ==
Shay was born on July 17, 1839, in Sherman Township, Huron County, Ohio. His parents were James and Phoebe (Probasco) Shay, whose families went back to colonial New York. His parents were of majority-English descent, with some Dutch and Polish ancestry. His mother's paternal line descended from immigrant George (Jurriaen) Probatski, who was from Breslau, Silesia (now Wroclaw, Poland). In 1654 Probatski went to the Netherlands and immigrated with some Dutch via Amsterdam and Brazil to New Netherland (New York). Over time, through Dutch and English marriages and variations, the name in the United States evolved to Probasco, probably within the first few generations.

In 1861, Shay moved to Muir, Michigan. Shortly after, he enlisted in Company D, 8th Missouri Infantry Regiment. In his American Civil War diary, Shay wrote, "Received marching orders. Quite a coincidence; on the day I am 22 years old I start on my first expedition to defend my country's honor and flag." Shay served in the Western Theatre of the war, under General William Tecumseh Sherman. He was honorably discharged in 1864 and returned to Ohio.

== Marriage and early career ==
Shay married Jane Henderson on July 26, 1864. The couple moved to Ionia County, Michigan, to be near his family members in Portland, Lyons, Muir, and Sebewa. In 1870 they moved to Sunfield, Michigan, where Shay operated a steam sawmill. Their son, Lette, was born there on January 26, 1870.

== Lumber and locomotive ==
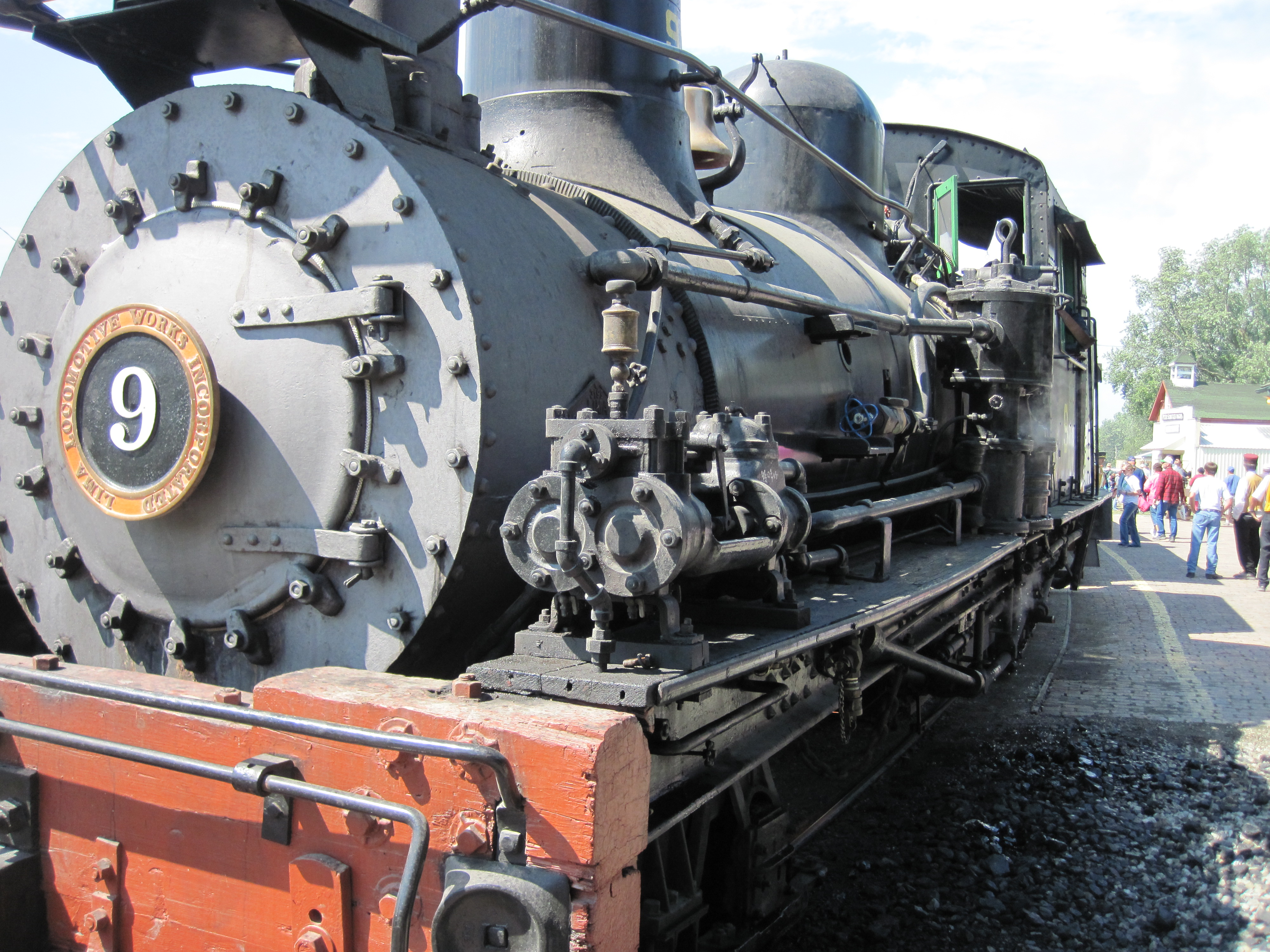
1923 Shay locomotive, West Side Lumber Co. #9, in service on the Midwest Central Railroad.

After 1873, the Shay family moved to Haring, Michigan, where Shay established a general store and sawmill, basics in a frontier town. In 1876 or 1877, he had the idea to use a locomotive to haul logs. He experimented with using maple strips on pine rails, to build rapid paths for a locomotive to travel in the forests, and developed the Shay locomotive. Shay started working with Lima Machine Works (later Lima Locomotive Works) in Lima, Ohio, licensing them to manufacture this model.

In 1880, the first Shay locomotive was shipped to a customer in Grand Rapids, Michigan, a center of logging on the Michigan peninsula. In 1881, Shay started filing patents for his works. William E. Woodard assisted Lima with improving the design of the engine. Lima built four Shay locomotives in 1881 and 37 Shays in 1883. In 1884, Lima had a 34-page catalog, featuring five models of Shay locomotives. From 1882 to 1892, Lima sold some 300 of the Shay locomotives. By the late 1890s, Shay Locomotives were shipped around the world.

== Experiments with steel ==
In 1888, Shay and his family moved to Harbor Springs, Michigan on Little Traverse Bay. There, he designed and built in about 1892 what is now known as the Shay Hexagon House, a hexagonal-shaped structure. It has four wings opening off the central core and a two-story tower on top. The house has been listed on the National Register of Historic Places. The interior and exterior walls were stamped steel, an unusual use of this relatively new product.

In 1891, Shay built an all-steel boat that was 40 feet long with a beam of 6 feet, named the Aha. Remains of the Aha have been returned to Harbor Springs and are preserved. Shay also designed and operated a private water works for the town of Harbor Springs. The use of steel for large lake freighters, developed in this period, was an important innovation to shipping on the Great Lakes.

Shay established a railroad, the Harbor Springs Railway (nicknamed the "Hemlock Central"), chartered in 1902. It was dissolved in 1912. Three locomotives of Shay's design were the only motive power. The railway primarily hauled lumber but was also used for sightseeing. Shay also made sleds with maple runners as Christmas gifts for local children, more than 400 sleds in total.

Shay's wife Jane died on July 24, 1912. He died on April 19, 1916. He is buried in the Lakeview Cemetery in Harbor Springs. The Harbor Springs Area Historical Society annually sponsors the "Shay Days" festival at Hexagon House, on a weekend close to Shay's birthday.

== Gallery ==
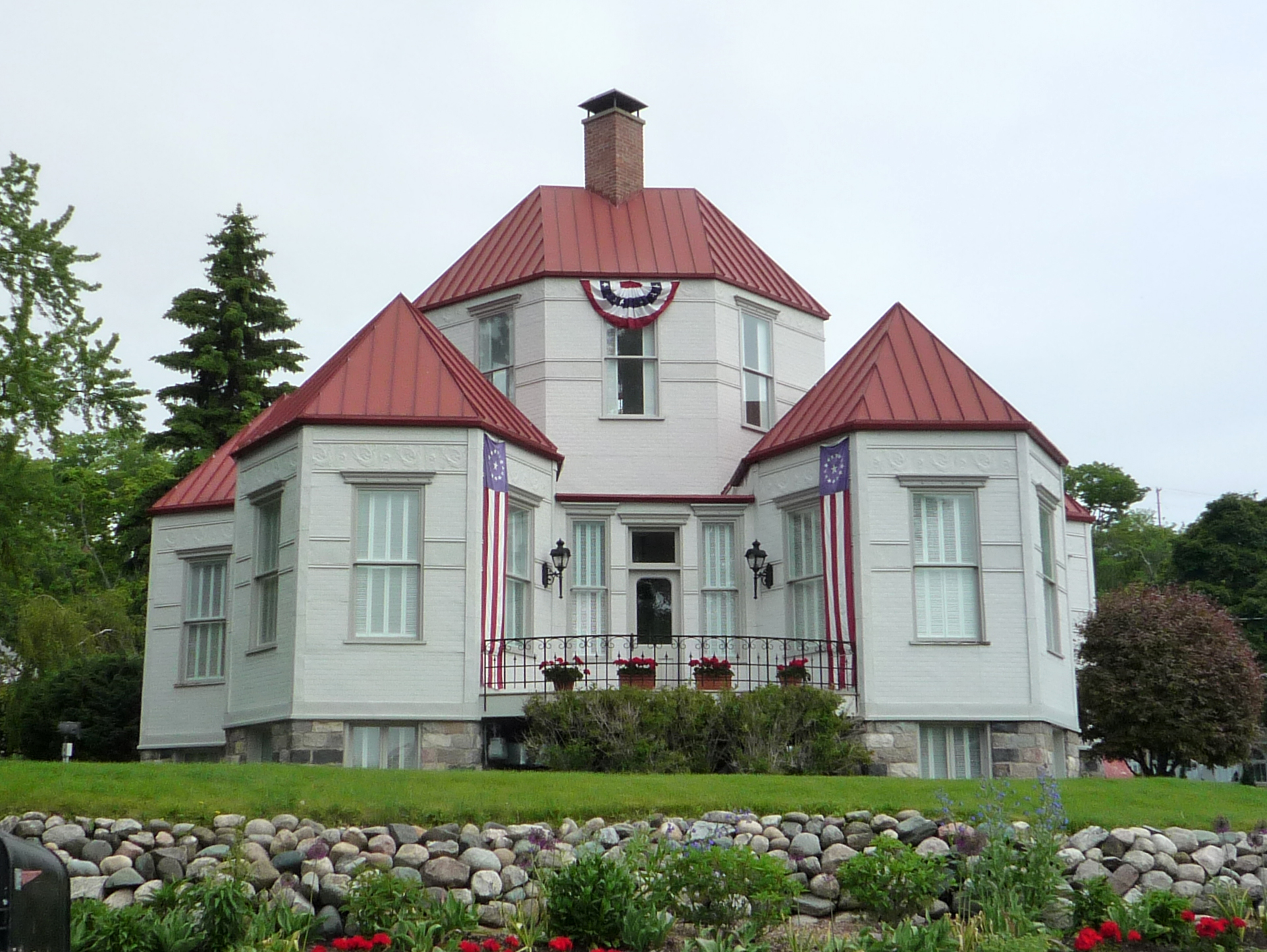
The Hexagon House in Harbor Springs, Michigan, designed and built by Shay.

== Sources ==
- Kyle Neighbors (1969) THE LIMA SHAYS ON THE GREENBRIER, CHEAT & ELK RAILROAD COMPANY, ASIN B001M07YHO
- Michael Koch The Shay Locomotive: Titan of the Timber, World Press; Limited ed edition (1971) ASIN B0006WIHIE
