= Newton Field =

- IATA: none; ICAO: none; FAA LID: 59B

Summary
- Airport type: Public
- Owner: Town of Jackman
- Serves: Jackman, Maine
- Elevation AMSL: 1,178 ft / 359 m
- Coordinates: 45°37′58″N 070°14′56″W

Map
- Location of airport in Maine 59B (the United States)

Runways
Direction	Length		Surface
Direction	ft	m	Surface
13/31	2,900	884	Asphalt

Statistics (2012)
- Aircraft operations: 3,500
- Based aircraft: 9
- Source: Federal Aviation Administration

Newton Field (FAA LID: 59B) is a town-owned, public use airport located one nautical mile (2 km) west of the central business district of Jackman, a town in Somerset County, Maine, United States. It is included in the National Plan of Integrated Airport Systems for 2011–2015, which categorized it as a general aviation facility.

== Facilities and aircraft ==
Newton Field covers an area of 132 acres (53 ha) at an elevation of 1,178 feet (359 m) above mean sea level. It has one runway designated 13/31 with an asphalt surface measuring 2,900 by 60 feet (884 x 18 m).

For the 12-month period ending August 9, 2012, the airport had 3,500 general aviation aircraft operations, an average of 291 per month. At that time there were nine single-engine aircraft based at this airport.

== See also ==
- List of airports in Maine
