= Newton Municipal Airport (Texas) =

- IATA: none; ICAO: none; FAA LID: 61R

Summary
- Airport type: Public
- Owner: Newton County
- Serves: Newton, Texas
- Elevation AMSL: 322 ft / 98 m
- Coordinates: 30°53′03″N 093°44′33″W

Map
- Location of airport in Texas

Runways
Direction	Length		Surface
Direction	ft	m	Surface
14/32	4,000	1,219	Asphalt

Statistics (2008)
- Aircraft operations: 600
- Based aircraft: 4
- Source: Federal Aviation Administration

Newton Municipal Airport (FAA LID: 61R) is a county-owned, public-use airport located three nautical miles (6 km) northeast of the central business district of Newton, a city in Newton County, Texas, United States.

== Facilities and aircraft ==
Newton Municipal Airport covers an area of 92 acres (37 ha) at an elevation of 322 feet (98 m) above mean sea level. It has one runway designated 14/32 with an asphalt surface measuring 4,000 by 60 feet (1,219 x 18 m).

For the 12-month period ending September 26, 2008, the airport had 600 general aviation aircraft operations, an average of 50 per month. At that time there were four aircraft based at this airport: 50% single-engine and 50% ultralight.

== See also ==
- List of airports in Texas
