= Newton Municipal Airport (Iowa) =

- IATA: TNU; ICAO: KTNU; FAA LID: TNU

Summary
- Airport type: Public
- Owner: City of Newton
- Serves: Newton, Iowa
- Elevation AMSL: 953 ft / 290 m
- Coordinates: 41°40′28″N 093°01′18″W

Map
- Location of airport in Iowa/United States TNU (the United States)

Runways
Direction	Length		Surface
Direction	ft	m	Surface
14/32	5,599	1,707	Asphalt

Statistics (2007)
- Aircraft operations: 9,000
- Based aircraft: 21
- Source: Federal Aviation Administration

Newton Municipal Airport (IATA: TNU, ICAO: KTNU, FAA LID: TNU) is a city-owned public-use airport located two miles (3 km) southeast of the central business district of Newton, a city in Jasper County, Iowa, United States. The airport is adjacent to Iowa Speedway.

== Facilities and aircraft ==
Newton Municipal Airport covers an area of 304 acres (123 ha) which contains one runway designated 14/32 with a 5,599 x 100 ft (1,707 x 30 m) asphalt surface. For the 12-month period ending September 12, 2007, the airport had 9,000 aircraft operations, an average of 24 per day: 93% general aviation and 7% air taxi. At that time there were 21 aircraft based at this airport: 90% single-engine and 10% multi-engine.

== Fly Iowa 2011 ==
On September 17, 2011, Newton was scheduled to be the host of the annual Fly Iowa Airshow. Fly Iowa travels to different towns in Iowa and hosts airshows for the public.

== See also ==
- List of airports in Iowa
