= Haring, Michigan =

- Census-designated place (CDP) & unincorporated community
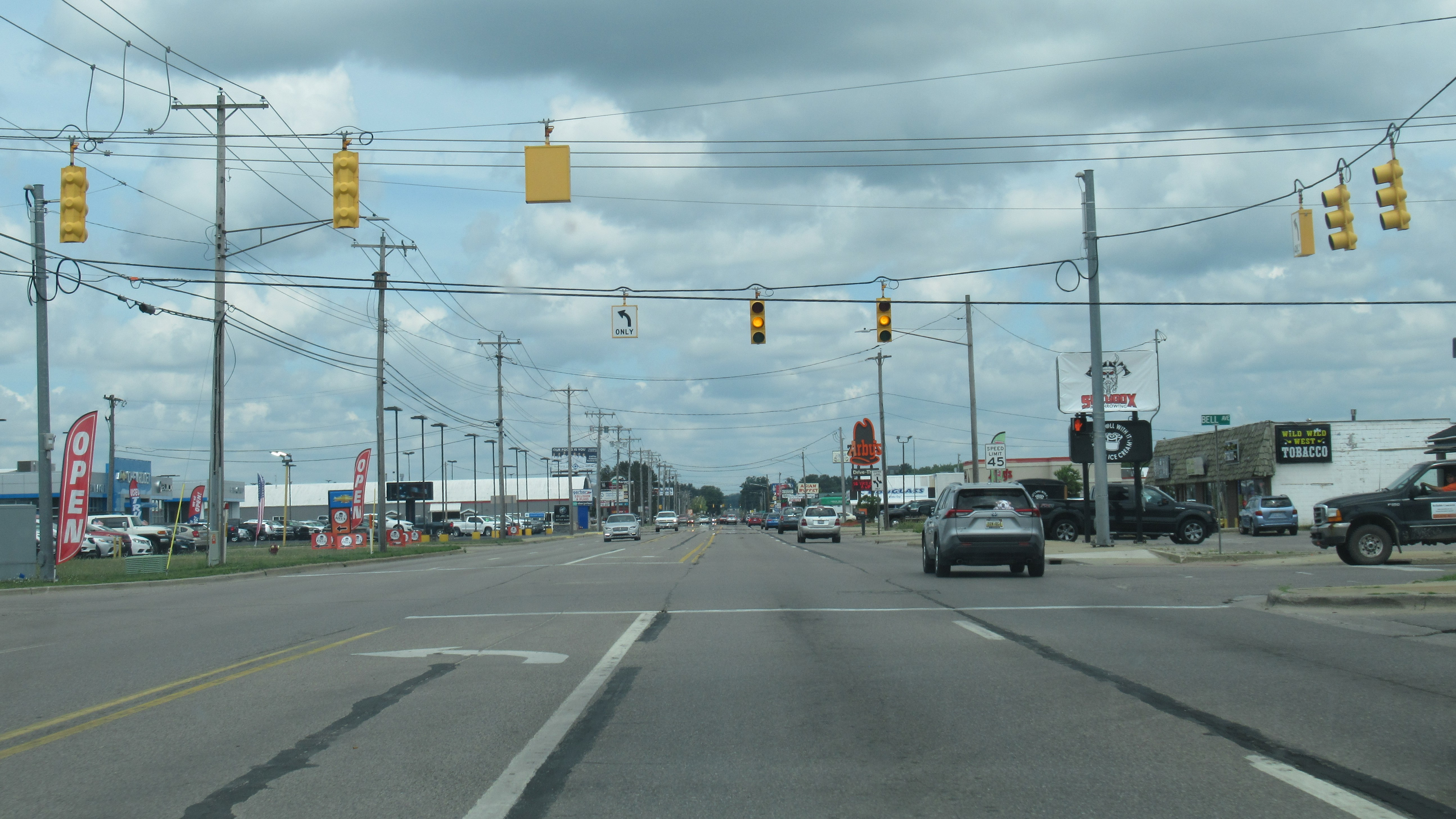
- Looking north along Bus. US 131 at Bell Road

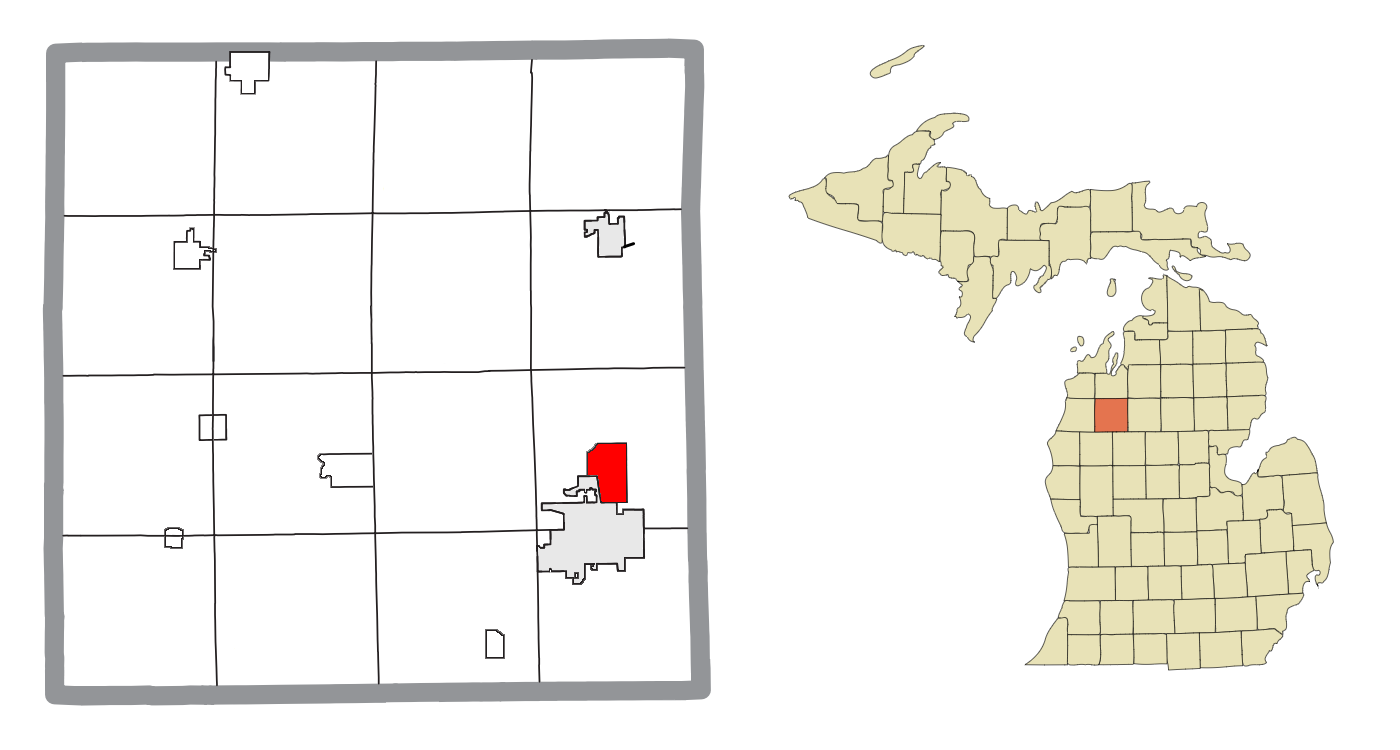
- Location within Wexford County

- Location within the state of Michigan Location within the United States
- Coordinates: 44°17′55″N 85°24′47″W
- Country: United States
- State: Michigan
- County: Wexford
- Township: Haring
- Settled: 1882

Area
  - Total: 2.31 sq mi (5.99 km^{2})
  - Land: 2.31 sq mi (5.99 km^{2})
  - Water: 0 sq mi (0.00 km^{2})
- Elevation: 1,325 ft (404 m)

Population (2020)
  - Total: 335
  - Density: 144.9/sq mi (55.95/km^{2})
- Time zone: UTC-5 (Eastern (EST))
  - Summer (DST): UTC-4 (EDT)
- ZIP code(s): 49601 (Cadillac)
- Area code: 231
- GNIS feature ID: 1620128

Haring is an unincorporated community and census-designated place (CDP) in Wexford County in the U.S. state of Michigan The population of the CDP was 335 as of the 2020 census. Haring is located within Haring Charter Township, just north of the city of Cadillac.

== History ==
Haring was first settled as early as 1872 around a mill operated by George A. Mitchell and Johnathon Cobbs. It later served as a railway station along Clam Lake (now known as Lake Cadillac). The early community was known as Linden when the post office was established on December 18, 1872. The post office and community were later renamed Haring after the township, and the post office operated until November 14, 1891.

The community of Haring was listed as a newly-organized census-designated place for the 2010 census, meaning it now has officially defined boundaries and population statistics for the first time.

== Geography ==
According to the U.S. Census Bureau, the community has an area of 2.31 square miles (5.98 km^{2}), all land.

=== Major highways ===
- US 131 runs south–north through the eastern portion of the community.
- Bus. US 131 is a business route that runs through Cadillac and north into Haring.

== Demographics ==
Historical population
Census	Pop.	Note	%±
2010	328		—
2020	335		2.1%
U.S. Decennial Census

== Education ==
Haring is served entirely by Cadillac Area Public Schools to the south in the city of Cadillac.
