= Shay locomotive =

Geared steam locomotive

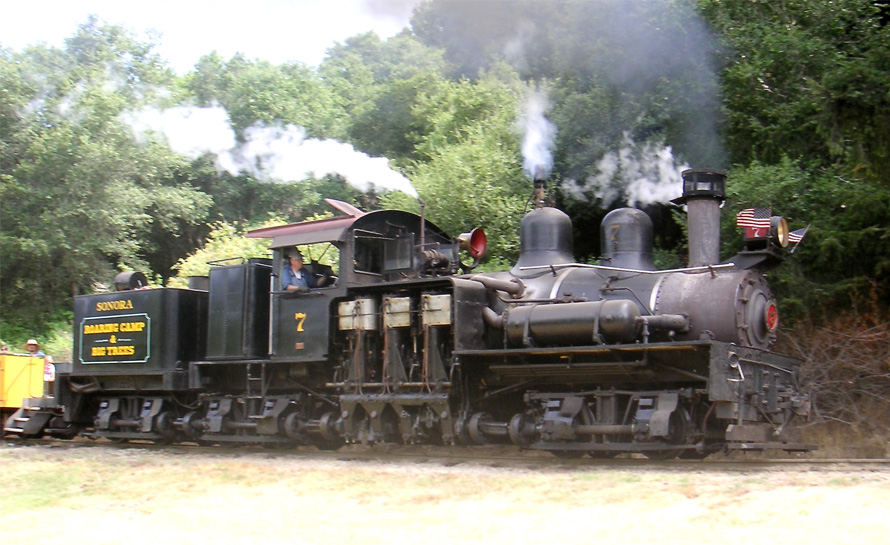
Shay Sonora Class C No. 7 (three driven trucks and articulated tender)

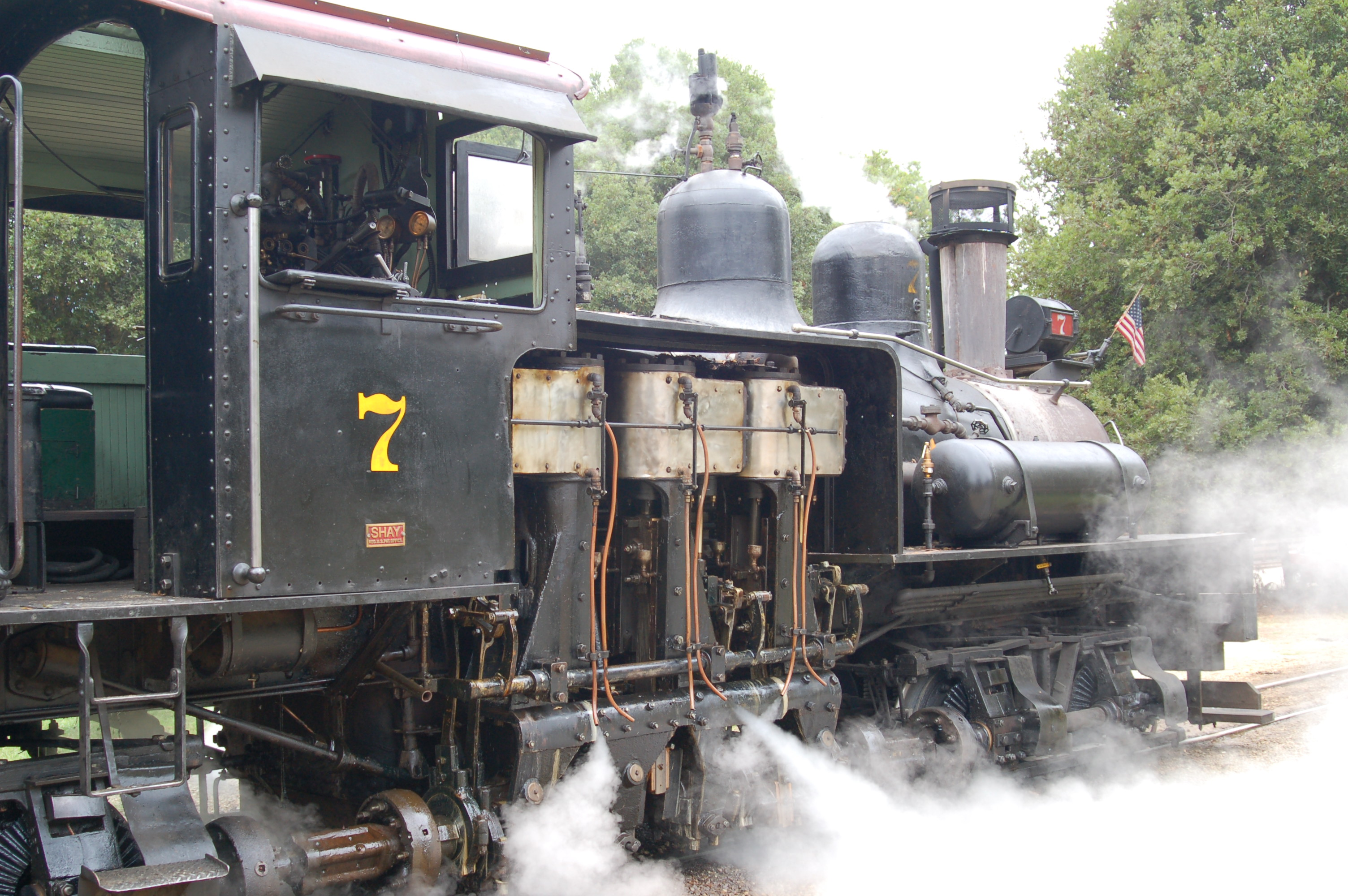
Shay Sonora Class C No. 7 Roaring Camp & Big Trees Narrow Gauge Railroad, Felton, California

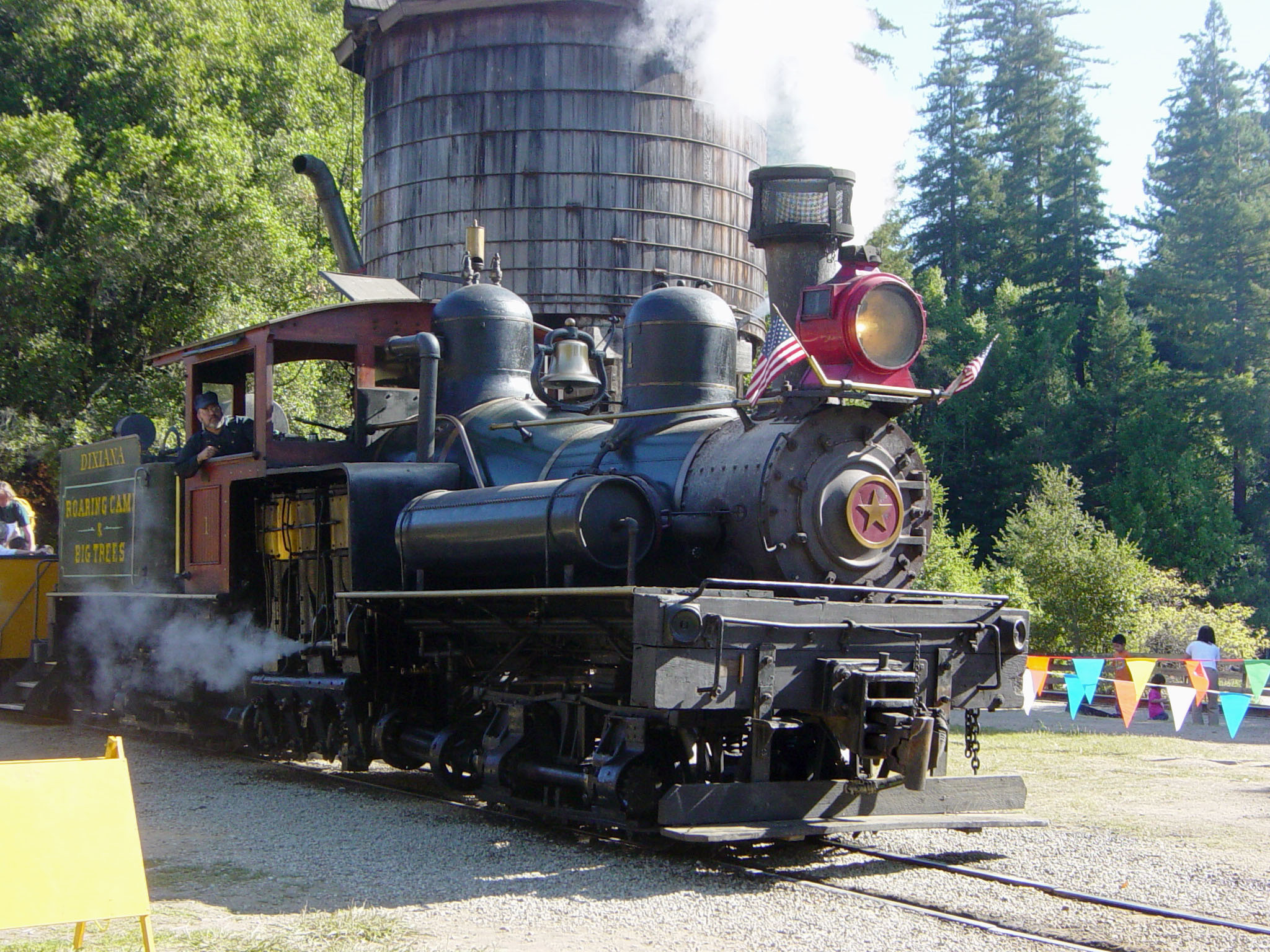
Drive side of the Class B Shay locomotive No. 1 Dixiana at the Roaring Camp & Big Trees Narrow Gauge Railroad, Felton, California

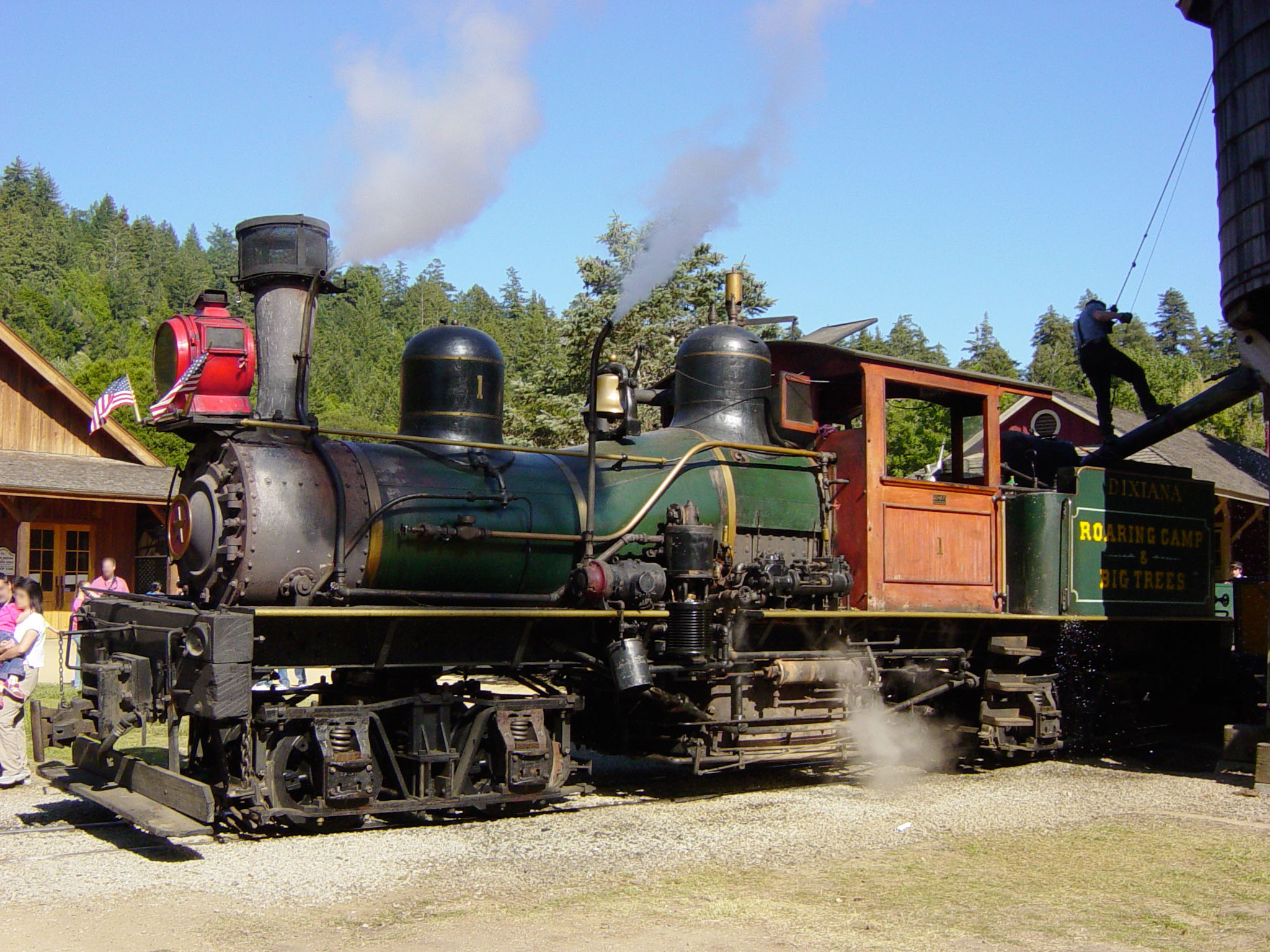
Accessory side of the No. 1 Dixiana

The Shay locomotive is a geared steam locomotive that originated and was primarily used in North America. The locomotives were built to the patents of Ephraim Shay, who has been credited with the popularization of the concept of a geared steam locomotive. Although the design of Ephraim Shay's early locomotives differed from later ones, there is a clear line of development that joins all Shays. Shay locomotives were especially suited to logging, mining and industrial operations and could operate successfully on steep or poor quality track.

== Development ==
Ephraim Shay (1839–1916), was a schoolteacher, a clerk in an American Civil War hospital, a civil servant, a logger, a merchant, a railway owner, and an inventor who lived in Michigan.

In the 1860s, Shay became a logger and wanted a better way to move logs to the mill than on winter snow sleds. He built his own tramway in 1875, on 2 ft 2 in (660 mm) gauge track on wooden ties, allowing him to log all year round. Two years later he developed the idea of having an engine sit on a flatcar with a boiler, gears, and trucks that could pivot. The first Shay only had two cylinders and the front truck was mounted normally while the rear truck was fixed to the frame and could not swivel, much as normal drivers on a locomotive. He mounted the 3-foot (910 mm) diameter by 5-foot (1,520 mm) tall boiler centered on the car with the water tank over the front trucks and with an engine supplied by William Crippen mounted crossways over the rear trucks. Shay experimented first with a chain drive from the engine through the floor to the truck axle. It is not known if he powered one or both axles, but he soon found that the chain drive was not practical and he next tried a belt drive. It did not take long for the idea to become popular.

Shay applied for and was issued a patent for the basic idea in 1881. He patented an improved geared truck for his engines in 1901.

Lima Locomotive Works of Lima, Ohio built Ephraim Shay's prototype engine in 1880. Prior to 1884, all the Shays Lima produced weighed 10 to 15 short tons (8.9 to 13.4 long tons; 9.1 to 13.6 t) each and had just two cylinders. In 1884, they delivered the first 3-cylinder (Class B) Shay, and in 1885, the first 3-truck (Class C) Shay. The success of the Shay led to a major expansion and reorganization of the Lima company. When Lima first received the Shay idea it was not impressed, until John Carnes influenced the company to use the idea, resulting in the classic Shay design.

In 1903, Lima could claim that it had delivered the "heaviest locomotive on drivers in the world", the first (class D) Shay, which still had three cylinders and three trucks, but weighing 140 short tons (120 long tons; 130 t). This was built for the El Paso Rock Island Line from Alamogordo, New Mexico to Cox Canyon, 31 miles (50 km) away over winding curves and grades of up to 6%. The use of a two-truck tender was necessary because the poor water quality along the line meant that the locomotive had to carry enough water for a round trip.

Lewis E. Feightner, working for Lima, patented improved engine mounting brackets and a superheater for the Shay in 1908 and 1909.

After the basic Shay patents had expired, Willamette Iron and Steel Works of Portland, Oregon, manufactured Shay-type locomotives, and in 1927, Willamette obtained a patent on an improved geared truck for such locomotives. These became known as Willamette locomotives. Since "Shay" was a trademark of Lima, strictly speaking it is incorrect to refer to locomotives manufactured by Willamette and others as "Shays". Six Shay Patent locomotives, known as Henderson-style Shays, were built by the Michigan Iron Works in Cadillac, Michigan.

== Overview ==
According to Lima Locomotive Works in 1925, "The Shay Geared Locomotive has a wide and varied range of service, being used in industrial, quarry, contractors, logging, mining and plantation work; (also on branch lines and mountain sections of trunk-line railways). It is especially adapted to industrial railroads in and around large manufacturing plants. Its value as a switching engine is due to the rapidity with which it will accelerate a load and to its ability to spot cars in a minimum of time. It is designed to take any curve on which standard cars can be operated." The company emphasized its performance on "steep grades", "uneven track", and "track too light for a direct engine of the same axle load".

Shay locomotives had regular fire-tube boilers offset to the left to provide space for, and counterbalance the weight of, a two or three cylinder "motor," mounted vertically on the right with longitudinal drive shafts extending fore and aft from the crankshaft at wheel axle height. These shafts had universal joints and square sliding prismatic joints to accommodate the swiveling trucks. Each axle was driven by a separate bevel gear, with no side rods.

The strength of these engines lies in the fact that all wheels (including, in some engines, those under the tender) are driven. The relatively low-friction of the steel-on-steel wheel-rail interface means that locomotives needed to apply downward pressure on the rails through their wheels to maintain traction. This pressure is nearly always in the form of weight: a heavier locomotive can thus apply more force to the rails without their wheels slipping (causing a sudden loss in traction). Before widespread adoption of diesel or electric engines, many locomotive types would have a set of wheels or bogies which were unpowered and only supported the weight of the engine. Because a Shay locomotive applies power to all wheels, every wheel on a Shay locomotive which bears weight and also develops tractive effort, and thus can be used for accelerating or braking. In addition, the Shay design is a geared steam locomotive, which allows the engine to run at a higher ratio of piston strokes to wheel revolutions, allowing the engine to be run at higher power settings while reducing the possibility of wheelslip.

Shay locomotives were often known as sidewinders or stemwinders for their side-mounted drive shafts. Most were built for use in the United States, but many were exported, to about 30 countries, either by Lima, or after they had reached the end of their usefulness in the US.

== Classes ==
Approximately 2,770 Shay locomotives were built by Lima in four classes, from 6 to 160 short tons (5.4 to 142.9 long tons; 5.4 to 145.1 t), between 1878 and 1945.

- Class A: two cylinders, two trucks. Weight between 6 and 24 short tons (5.4 and 21.4 long tons; 5.4 and 21.8 t).
- Class B: three cylinders, two trucks. Weight between 10 and 60 short tons (8.9 and 53.6 long tons; 9.1 and 54.4 t).
- Class C: three cylinders, three trucks. Weight between 40 and 160 short tons (36 and 143 long tons; 36 and 145 t).
- Class D: three cylinders, three trucks. Weight of 100 and 150 short tons (89 and 134 long tons; 91 and 136 t). They were a larger, heavier, long-frame version of a Class C, but were no more powerful than Class C, and had greater fuel and water capacity, resulting in improved adhesion.

Two 15 short tons (13 long tons; 14 t) Shays were built with two cylinders and three trucks.

Four Shays, 600 mm (1 ft 11 5/8 in) gauge, were built left-handed, all special ordered by the Sr. Octaviano B. Cabrera Co., San Luis de la Paz, Mexico.

== Survivors ==
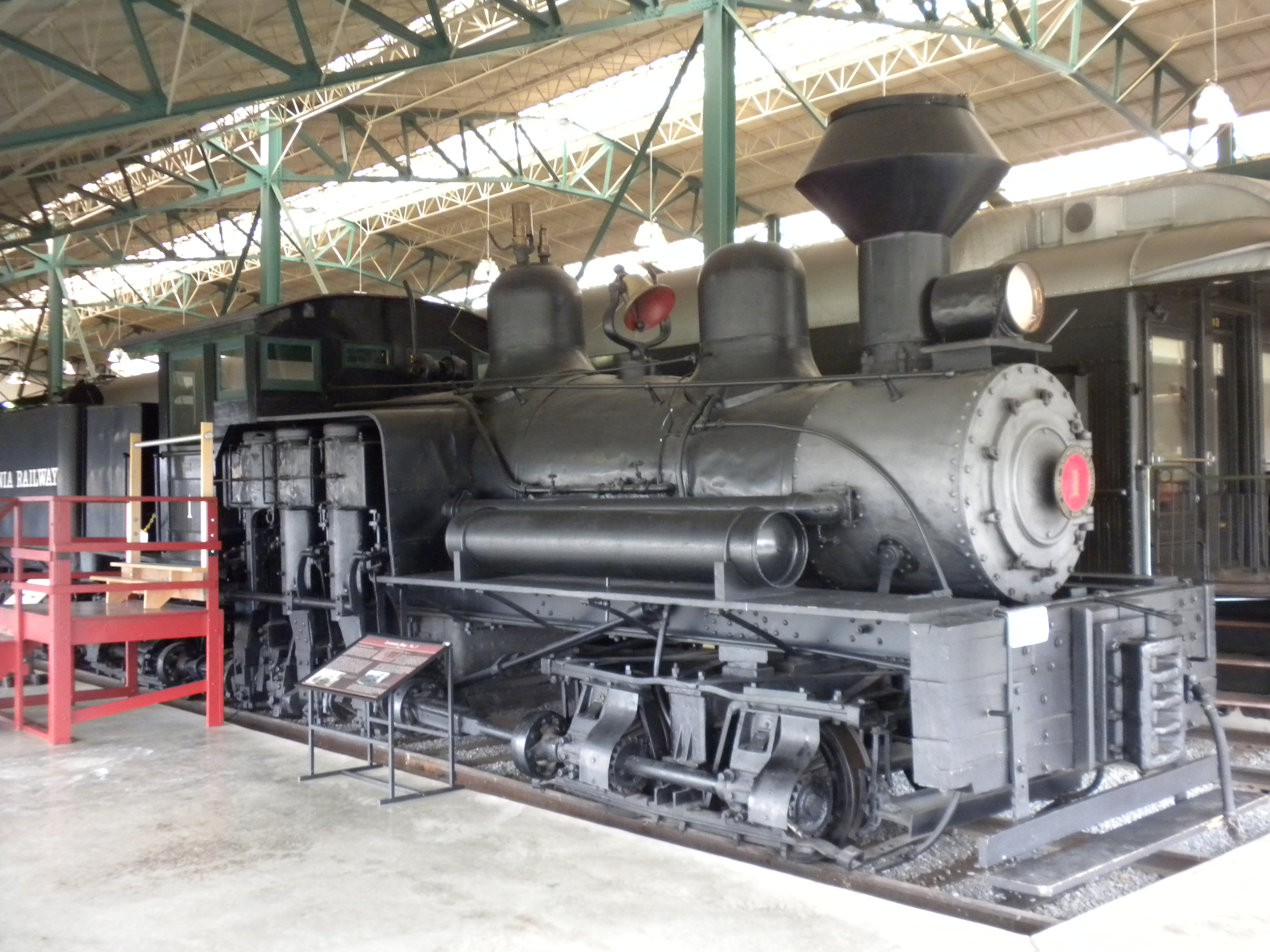
Shay "Leetonia No. 1" at the Railroad Museum of Pennsylvania

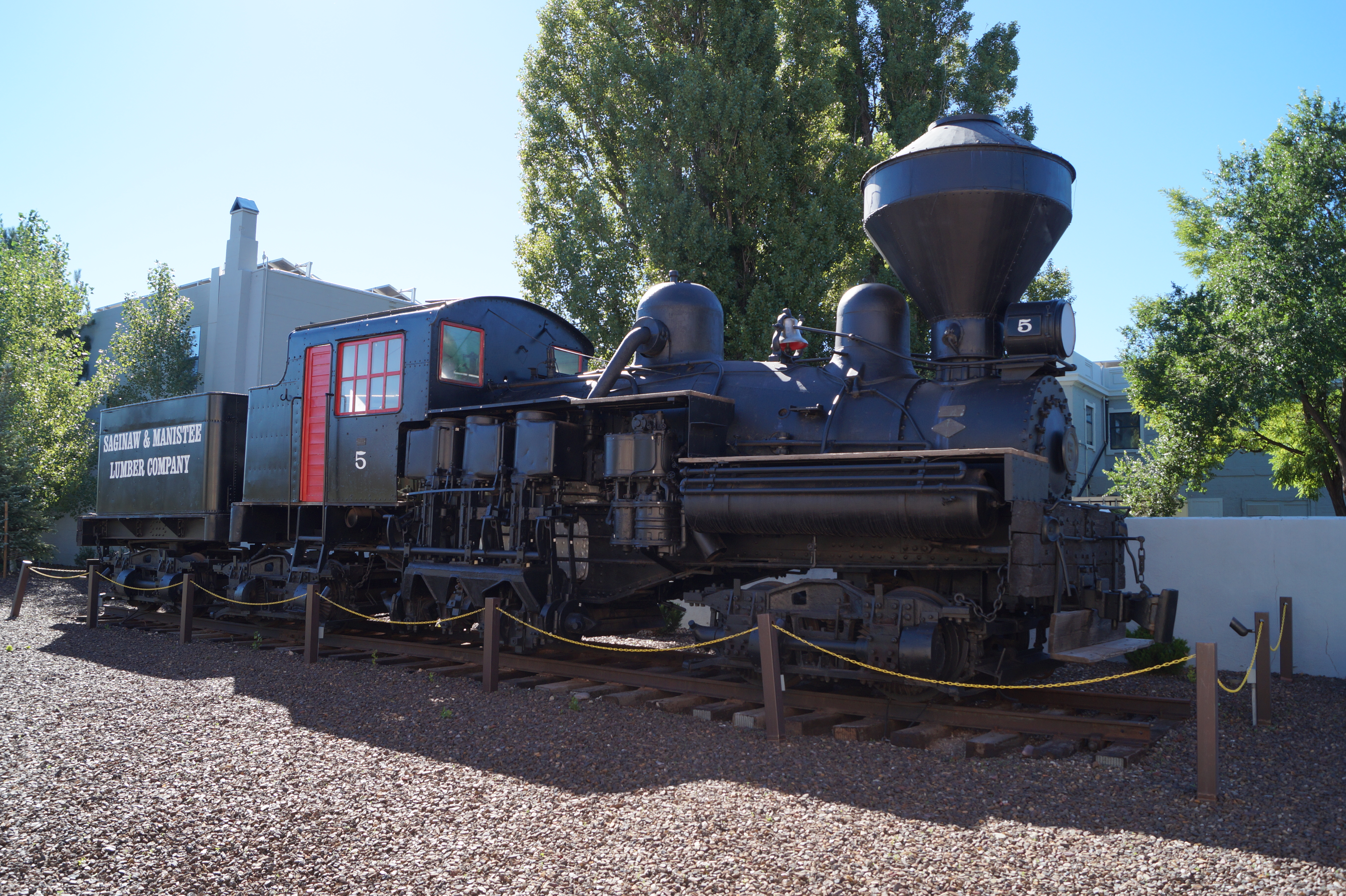
Anaconda Copper Mining Co. Shay No. 5 on static display by the Williams Depot. The drive shafts between the crankshaft and the trucks have been removed.

116 Shays survive today, some a combination of parts of two Shays. This is a partial list:

- The oldest surviving Shay, serial number 122, built in 1884, is currently displayed in Redding California, at Turtle Bay Exploration Park.
- The oldest operational Shay is located at the Cass Scenic Railroad State Park in West Virginia as their locomotive No. 5. It was first bought in 1905 by the West Virginia Pulp & Paper Co. at Cass. Number 5 is in fact still running on its original rail since it first ran in 1905, and it was designated the official state steam locomotive in 2004.
- The Yosemite Lumber Company's #4 Shay is partially restored and is on display at the Sierra Nevada Logging Museum in Arnold, California. It worked at the top of the El Portal Incline, bringing sugar pine logs to the incline head, where the loaded rail cars were lowered about 3,000 foot (910 m) in 1.5 miles (2.4 km). There they were picked up by a different railroad and taken to the mill.
- The Arizona State Railroad Museum foundation owns former Anaconda Copper Mining Shay No. 5, which was previously stored in Montana. Although it never operated in Arizona, it was acquired by the ASRM to represent the Shays used by various logging and short line railroads in Northern Arizona, such as the Saginaw and Manistee Lumber Company. It has been displayed by the Grand Canyon Hotel in Williams since 2014.
- Mount Emily Lumber Company 1 was operated by the Oregon Historical Society for several years. Since 2022, it has been owned by the Oregon Rail Heritage Foundation of Portland, Oregon.
- Stimson Lumber Company "Peggy" (a Class: B 42-2 Shay) was built in 1909, shipped to Seattle where it changed owners until eventually the Stimpson Lumber company bought it to work their Oregon and Washington holdings. Peggy worked those holdings until 1950, when it was retired from active service and donated to the City of Portland. Between 1969 and '71 she was refurbished and moved to her present location at the World Forestry Center, where she remains today.
- Restored and on outdoor display in downtown Cadillac, Michigan for free viewing is a Cadillac–Soo Lumber Company locomotive with tender.
- The Allen County Museum in Lima, Ohio displays a two-truck, 3 ft (914 mm) gauge Shay which was used in a local quarry, and is probably the survivor nearest to the factory where it was built in 1925. It was rescued in 1953 only hours before being cut up for scrap, and was restored at no cost by Baldwin-Lima-Hamilton.
- The Camino-Placerville & Lake Tahoe No. 2, a three-truck Shay, is on display at the Travel Town Museum in Los Angeles, California.
- The Roaring Camp & Big Trees Narrow Gauge Railroad in Felton, California, operates two Shays, No. 1 Dixiana (Class B, s/n 2593 of 1912) and No. 7 Sonora (Class C, s/n 2465 of 1911).
- Railtown 1897 State Historic Park preserves a class C Shay, Sierra Railroad No. 2, and occasionally runs it on its excursion trains.
- The Colorado Railroad Museum has one Shay, No. 14, which operated on the Georgetown Loop Railroad for about 20 years.
- The New Jersey Museum of Transportation at Allaire State Park is restoring the 3 ft (914 mm) gauge Ely-Thomas Lumber Company No. 6. This locomotive ran on the Pine Creek Railroad from around 1955 through 2002, when it was taken out of service for boiler work.

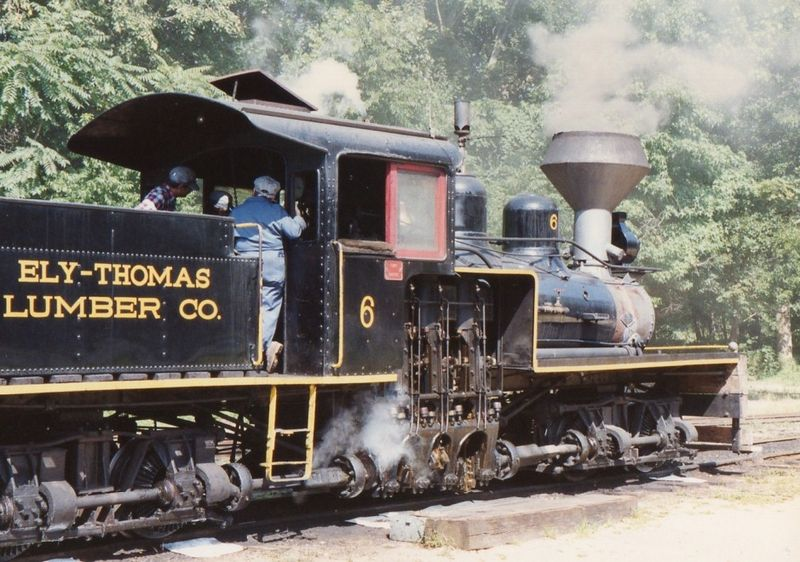
Ely-Thomas Lumber Company No. 6 operating at New Jersey Museum of Transportation

- The Yosemite Mountain Sugar Pine Railroad owns and operates three former West Side Lumber Company Shays, Nos. 10, 12, and 15, on its line just south of Yosemite National Park.
- Stephen F. Austin State University has a Shay locomotive (s/n 2005 of 1907) on display outside of the Arthur Temple College of Forestry and Agriculture in Nacogdoches, Texas.
- The Canada Science and Technology Museum owns one operational engine constructed from two locomotives, Merrill & Ring Lumber Co. numbers 3 and 4, used in their forestry operations at Theodosia Arm on the British Columbia mainland. This Shay is operated by volunteers of the Bytown Railway Society
- Graham County Railroad No. 1925, (Class C, s/n 3256 of 1925), survives at the North Carolina Transportation Museum in Spencer, North Carolina. 1925 is the fastest Shay ever recorded, recorded running at 18 miles per hour (29 km/h) during "The Great Shay Race" at Railfair '99. It ran at the museum from 1997 to 2005 when the engine required boiler work. Since then it has been stored in the roundhouse as a static exhibit, and the universal joints have been removed.
- Serial number 3345, a class C Shay was the last narrow gauge Shay. It was built in 1929 for the New Mexico Lumber Company. It was acquired by the LaPorte County Historical Steam Society and moved to the Hesston Steam Museum, where it was damaged in an engine house fire in 1985. It was rebuilt and resumed operation in 2006.

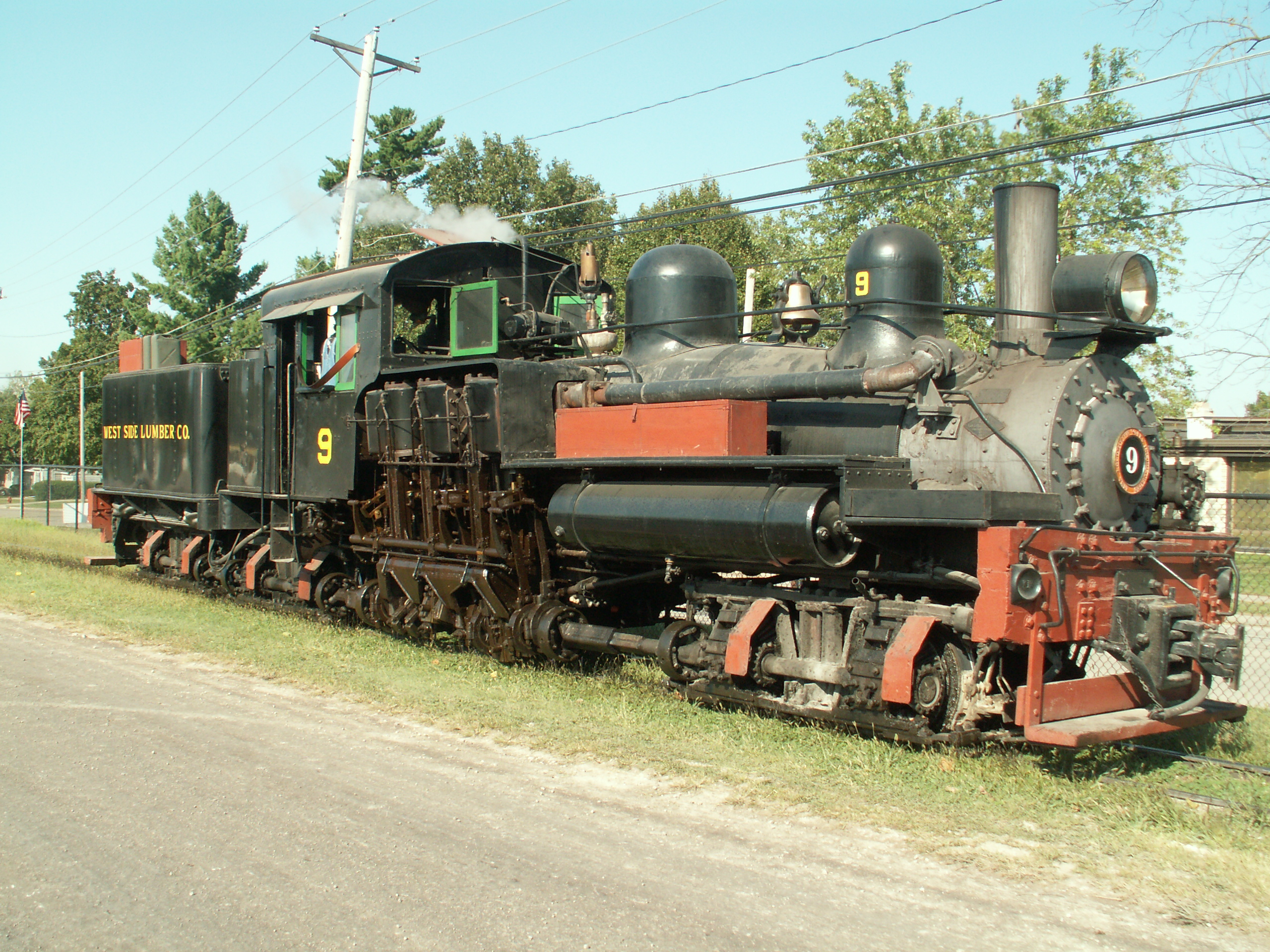
Midwest Central Railroad Three-Truck Shay No. 9

- West Side Lumber Company No. 9 (Class C, s/n 3199 of 1923) was purchased by the Midwest Central Railroad in 1966, and with a minor refurbishment in the mid 1990s, continued to operate there. In January 2011, the MCRR and the Georgetown Loop Railroad entered into a 7 to 10-year agreement where 9 was refurbished by the GLRR staff. It went into revenue passenger service at the Georgetown Loop Railroad on July 14, 2012. It returned to Iowa in late summer 2019, and began service at the 2019 Reunion.
- The Illinois Railway Museum, the largest railroad museum in the United States, runs a three-truck three-cylinder Lima built in 1929, a veteran of the J. Neils Lumber Company.

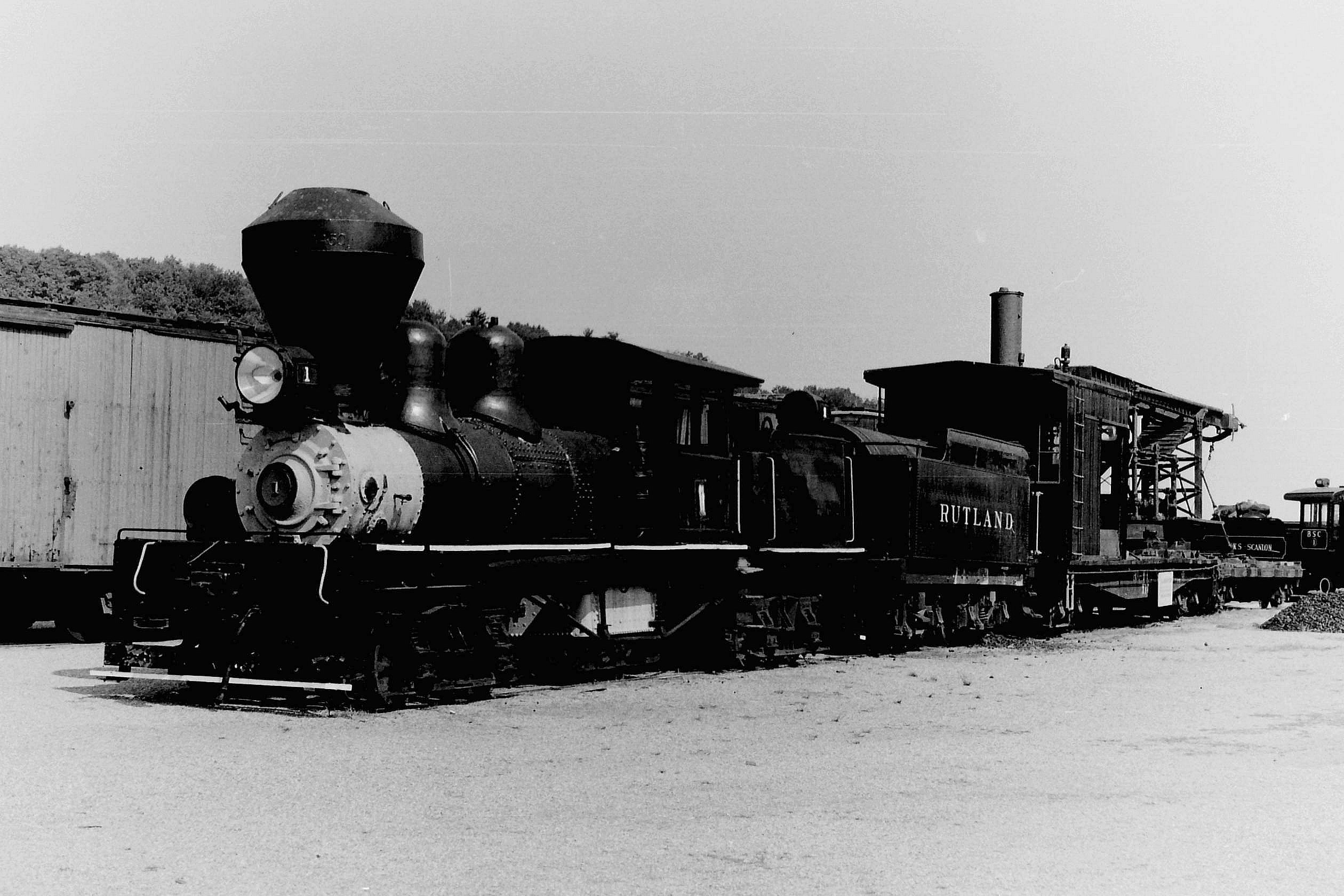
Meadow River Lumber Co. No. 1

- Meadow River Lumber Co. No.1 is the only Shay in the collection at the Steamtown National Historic Site in Scranton, Pennsylvania
- The Cass Scenic Railroad has the following Shays:
  - Class C No. 6 (s/n 3354 of 1945) built for the Western Maryland Railway and the last production Shay. It is the second largest Shay built weighing 162 tons. It was in service for only four years when it was retired and placed in the B&O Railroad Museum. In 1981 it was removed from static display, in exchange for a smaller Shay (ex- Cass Scenic No. 1) and Porter 0-4-0T Saint Elizabeth #4. It is the largest surviving Shay.
  - Class C #11, built in 1923, from the Hutchinson Lumber Company, Feather Falls, California; it weighs 103-tons.
  - Class C No. 2, a Pacific Coast Shay built in July 1928 for the Mayo Lumber Company of Paldi, Vancouver Island, British Columbia. No. 2 is the only Shay to have burned wood, coal, and oil in her lifetime..
  - Class C-70 No. 4; originally number 5 of the Birch Valley Lumber Company, Tioga, West Virginia in 1922.
  - Class C-70 No. 7, No. 4, which is non-operational.
- The 762 mm (2 ft 6 in) gauge Alishan Forest Railway in Taiwan has two classes of Shay. It has five 18-ton Class A models and ten 28-ton Class B Models. Four of Class Bs are operational: numbers. 21, 25, 26, and 31. The rest are on static on display in Taiwan. No. 14 has been exported to Australia's Puffing Billy Railway.
- Locomotive No. 22 is on display at Jiji Railway Station in Jiji, Taiwan
- The Little River Railroad And Lumber Company 70-ton Shay number 2147 resides at the company's museum in Townsend, Tennessee.

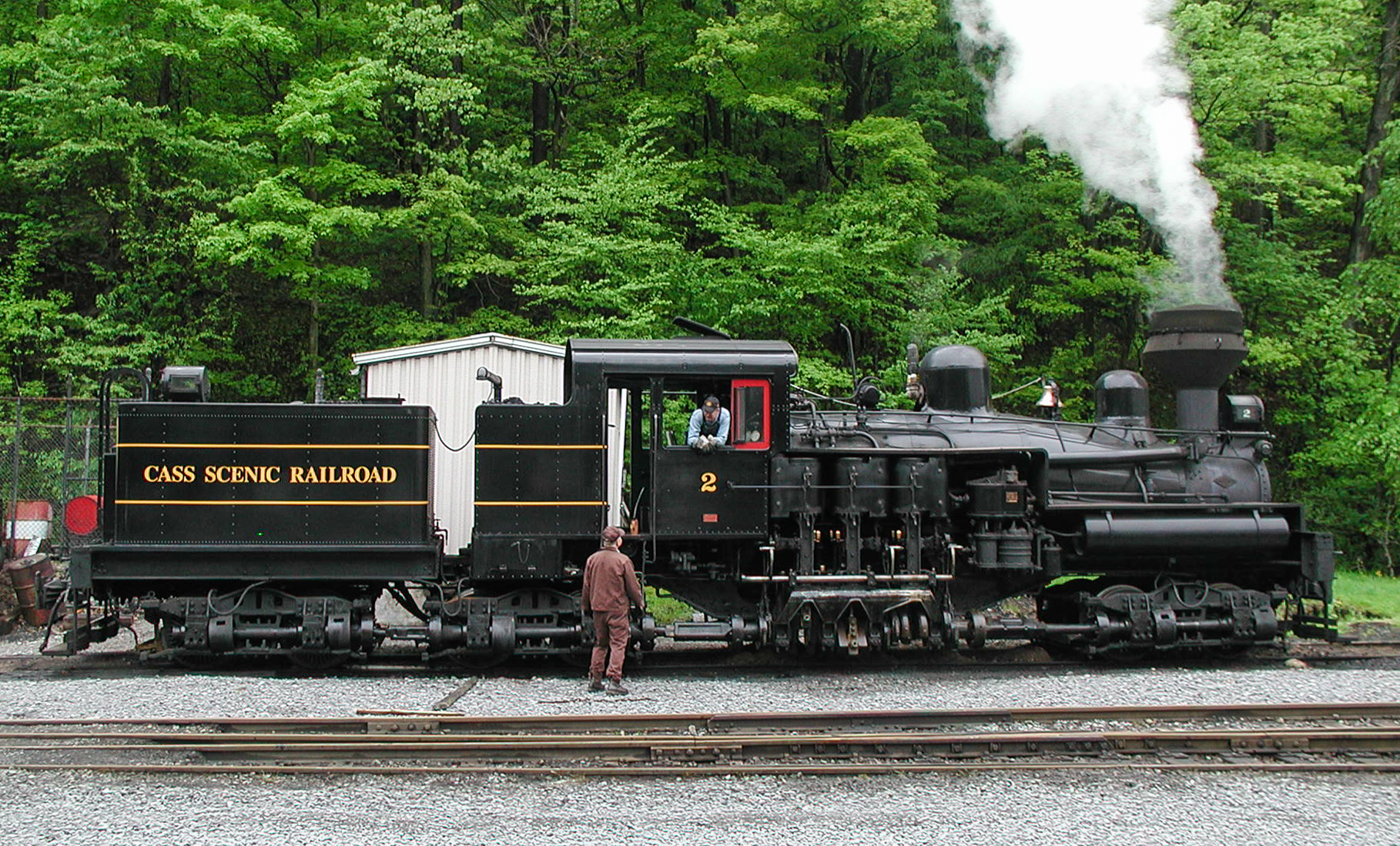
Cass Scenic Railway Shay No. 2 engine at Cass Station, WV

- The Railway Historical Society of Northern New York (RHSNNY) is home to the Class B Shay No. 8 "Livingston Lansing" which was willed to the museum by Mr. Lansing. It is on display at the RHSNNY museum in Croghan, N.Y., on the Lowville and Beaver River Railroad. It is not operational.
- Three Class B Shays are at the BC Forest Discovery Centre in Duncan, British Columbia.
  - Mayo Lumber Co. No. 3; (Shay No. 3262), built in 1924, is a wood burner which weighs in at 100,000 lb (45,000 kg). The Mayo family donated # 3 in 1967. No. 3 was rebuilt in 1995.
  - Bloedel Steward & Welch Ltd. No. 1, built in 1911, is a Class B 2 truck engine. It was purchased by Gerry Wellburn for use on his Deerholme property in 1954, where it remained in service until 1964, when he moved it to the BC forest discovery center as a static display.
- Goodman Lumber Company No. 9 is on display at Mid-Continent Railway Museum in North Freedom, WI
- The Longview Public Library in Longview, WA has a fully restored Shay on the library grounds. During special events that is close to the Library and the Civic Center, the Shay is opened up for the public to walk through. http://longviewlibrary.org/shay.php
- Shop number 2769, built in 1914 for the Great Northern Railway, is currently on display in a small park near the BNSF mainline in Columbia Falls, Montana.
- One Class C Shay is exhibited at Buenavista railway station in Mexico City, formerly belonged to Teziutlan Copper Co. as TCC-2, weighing 45 tons, with a wheel drive engaged for 29.5 in (0.75 m), vertical cylinders 10 by 12 in (250 by 300 mm), a force transmission and crankshaft gears. It used wood as fuel until 1946, when it was adapted to burn oil. The Compañía Minera Autlán SA de CV donated this locomotive to Ferrocarriles Nacionales de México as a historical piece in October 1980.
- Abitibi Power and Paper Co. Shay No. 70, Shop No. 3298, built in 1924, hauled lumber for the Abitibi Power and Paper Co. for many years before being donated to the Town of Iroquois Falls where it currently sits in a small park. Originally built for the Tallassee Power Co. as the 2,713th Shay built. It was passed to five different companies before retiring.
- The Davis-Aken Lumber Company #2 Shay is on display at the Pennsylvania Lumber Museum in Ulysses, Pennsylvania.
- Lopez Sugar Corporation No. 10 is the only known extant example in the island of Negros in the Philippines. It is displayed in front of the company headquarters as of June 2022.
- The Woodstock Lumber Co. Class B Shay No. 5, Shop No. 2958 is owned by Clark's Bears, formerly Clark's Trading Post, in Lincoln, NH. Built in 1917 and bought by the Woodstock Lumber Co., new, in 1919. The 2-truck 50-ton was used as a switcher in their yard. Other sources say that the locomotive saw service on the Beebe Railroad in Campton, NH, as well as the East Branch & Loncoln Railroad. The Woodstock Lumber Company became the Franconia Paper Co., and Clark's bought it from them between 1951 and 1952. The Shay is not operational currently, and there are no known plans to restore it. It can sometimes be found on display, along with the disassembled components of Clark's Heisler Locomotive.

== Images ==
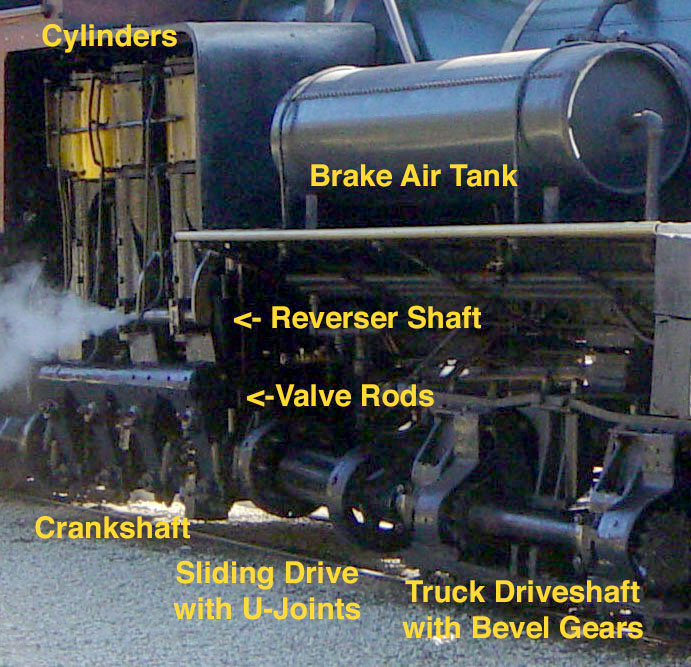
Cass Scenic Railroad ID photo

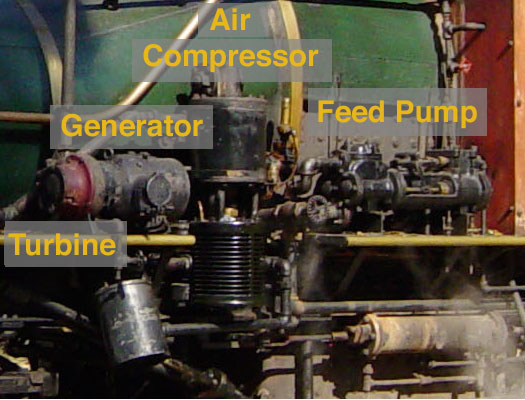
Dixiana accessory details (The device labeled "Feed Pump" is actually a Fire Pump which feeds water to a hose used for firefighting. Dixiana uses two Nathan Monitor #6 injectors as boiler feed devices.)

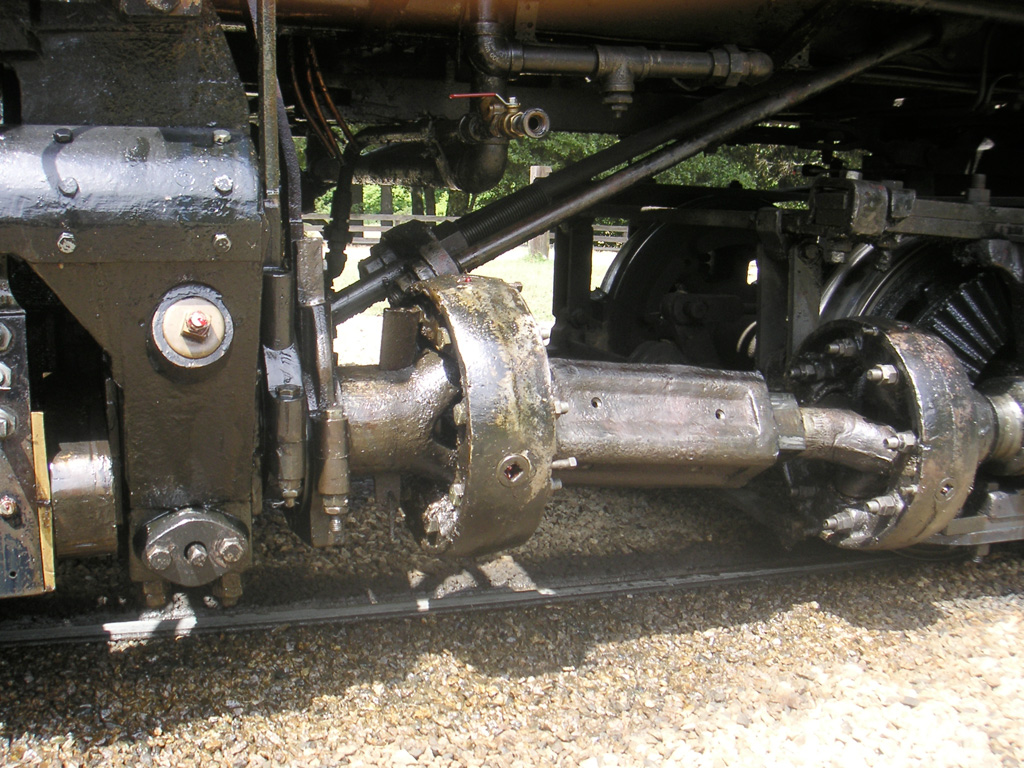
Sonora's universal joints with sliding coupling between

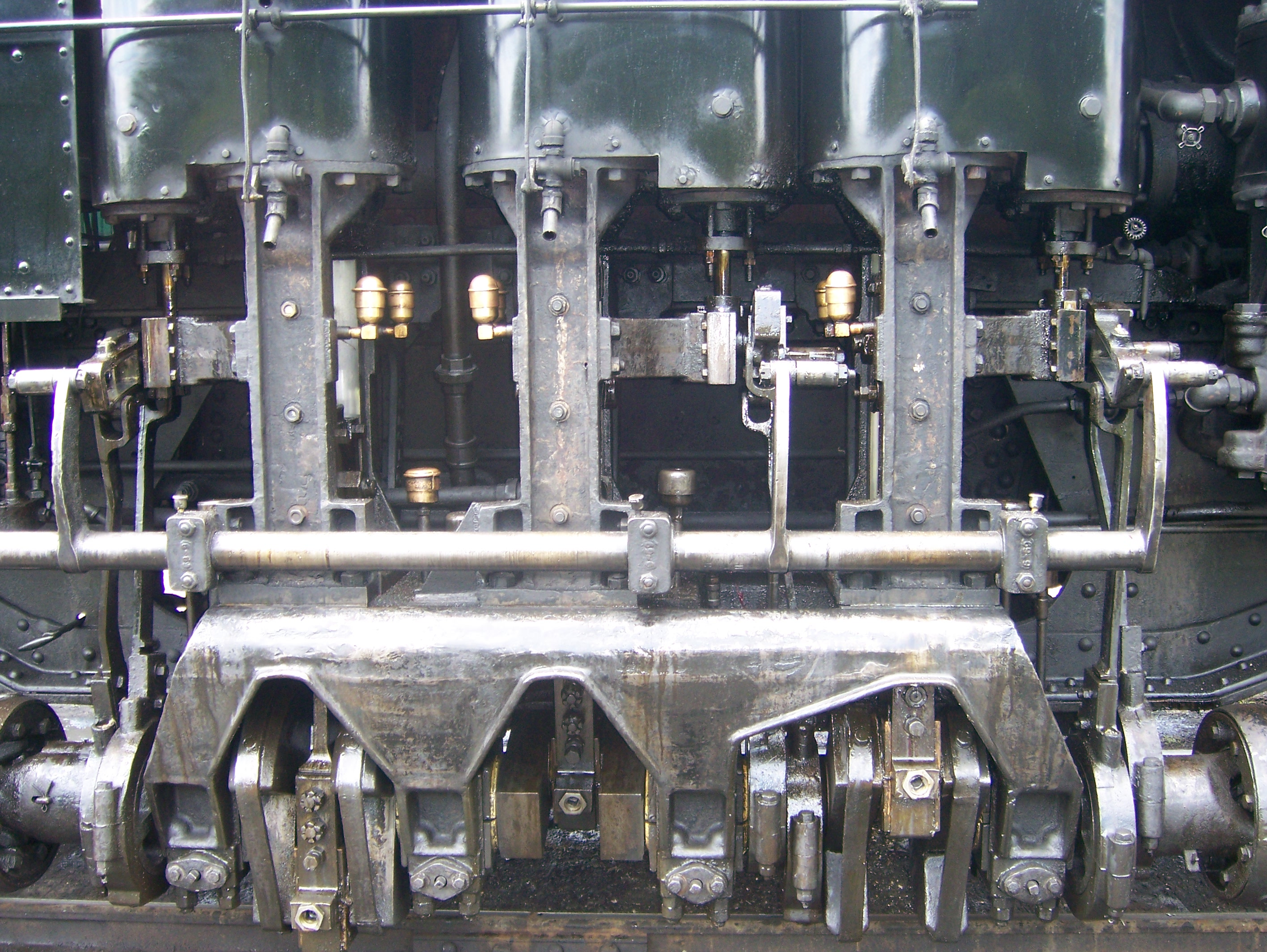
Engine of Shay locomotive built by Lima Locomotive Works (s/n 3320 of 1928). Locomotive is still in operation in Cass Scenic Railroad State Park as Cass Scenic No. 2

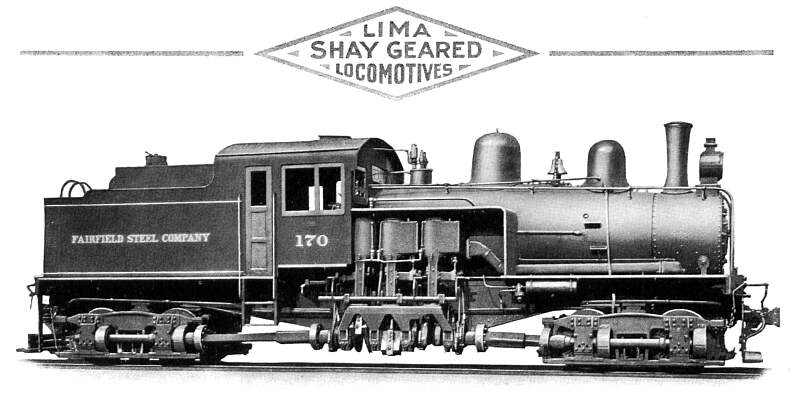
Illustration from Lima catalog – Class B 70-ton (s/n 2982 of 1918) – Fairfield Steel 170 later became Tennessee Coal, Iron and Railroad 170

== See also ==
- Shay Hexagon House

== Sources ==
- Kyle Neighbors (1969) THE LIMA SHAYS ON THE GREENBRIER, CHEAT & ELK RAILROAD COMPANY ASIN B001M07YHO
- Michael Koch The Shay Locomotive: Titan of the Timber World Press; Limited ed edition (1971) ASIN B0006WIHIE
- Shay Locomotive Works Shay Geared Locomotives and Repair Parts Catalogue Periscope Film LLC (January 26, 2010) ISBN 978-1-935327-92-9
- Philip V. Bagdon Shay Logging Locomotive at Cass, West Virginia, 1901-1960 TLC Publishing (December 21, 2001) ISBN 978-1-883089-65-8
- The Lima Locomotive & Machine Company Shay Patent and Direct Locomotives: Logging Cars, Car Wheels, Axles, Railroad and Machinery Castings Periscope Film LLC (March 24, 2010) ISBN 978-1-935700-11-1
- Ranger, Dan. Pacific Coast Shay, Strong Man of the Woods. (Golden West Books, 1964)
- https://www.shaylocomotives.com/data/factsheet/sn-3298.htm
- http://whitemountaincentralrr.com/history/locomotives/steam-loco-shay-2/
- https://logginginlincoln.com/Locomotives_in_Lincoln.html
- Clark's Bears
