= Michigan's 2nd congressional district =

U.S. House district for Michigan

Coordinates: 43°23′51″N 86°19′08″W

- Interactive map of district boundaries since January 3, 2023
- Representative: John Moolenaar; R–Caledonia
- Distribution: 74.26% urban; 25.74% rural
- Population (2025): 784,079
- Median household income: $70,657
- Ethnicity: 87.8% White; 4.7% Hispanic; 4.0% Two or more races; 2.0% Black; 0.7% Native American; 0.5% Asian; 0.3% other
- Cook PVI: R+15

Michigan's 2nd congressional district is a United States congressional district in Western Michigan. The current 2nd district includes all of Barry, Clare, Gladwin, Gratiot, Ionia, Isabella, Lake, Manistee, Mason, Mecosta, Montcalm, Newaygo, Oceana, and Osceola counties, as well as portions of Eaton, Kent, Midland, Muskegon, Ottawa and Wexford counties. Redistricting removed the more built-up portions of Kent and Muskegon counties, and all but the northeast corner of Ottawa County. Republican John Moolenaar, who had previously represented the old 4th district, was re-elected to represent the new 2nd in 2022 after the 2nd absorbed much of the dismantled 4th's northern portion.

== Counties and municipalities ==
For the 118th and successive Congresses (based on redistricting following the 2020 census), the district contains all or portions of the following counties and municipalities:

Barry County (5)

All 5 municipalities

Clare County (11)

All 11 municipalities

Eaton County (5)

Kalamo Township (part; also 7th), Sunfield, Sunfield Township, Vermontville, Vermontville Township

Gladwin County (17)

All 17 municipalities

Gratiot County (22)

All 22 municipalities

Ionia County (26)

All 26 municipalities

Isabella County (21)

All 21 municipalities

Kent County (19)

Algoma Township, Bowne Township, Caledonia, Caledonia Charter Township, Casnovia (shared with Muskegon County), Cedar Springs, Courtland Township, Grattan Township, Kent City, Lowell, Lowell Charter Township, Nelson Township, Oakfield Township, Sand Lake, Solon Township, Sparta, Sparta Township, Tyrone Township, Vergennes Township

Lake County (17)

All 17 municipalities

Manistee County (20)

All 20 municipalities

Mason County (20)

All 20 municipalities

Mecosta County (21)

All 21 municipalities

Midland County (6)

Coleman, Edenville Township, Geneva Township, Greendale Township, Jasper Township, Warren Township

Montcalm County (29)

All 29 municipalities

Muskegon County (18)

Blue Lake Township, Casnovia (shared with Kent County), Casnovia Township, Cedar Creek Township, Dalton Township, Egelston Township, Fruitland Charter Township, Holton Township, Laketon Township (part; also 3rd), Lakewood Club, Montague, Montague Township, Moorland Township, Muskegon Charter Township (part; also 3rd), North Muskegon (part; also 3rd) Whitehall, Whitehall Township, White River Township

Newaygo County (29)

All 29 municipalities

Oceana County (23)

All 23 municipalities

Osceola County (22)

All 22 municipalities

Ottawa County (1)

Chester Township

Wexford County (17)

Antioch Township, Boon Township, Cadillac, Cedar Creek Township, Cherry Grove Township, Clam Lake Township, Colfax Township, Haring Charter Township, Harrietta, Henderson Township, Manton, Mesick, Selma Township, Slagle Township, South Branch Township, Springville Township, Wexford Township (part; also 1st)

== Recent election results from statewide races ==
Year	Office	Results
2008	President	Obama 48.9% - 48.7%
2012	President	Romney 55% - 45%
2014	Senate	Lynn Land 49% - 45%
2014	Governor	Snyder 57% - 40%
2014	Secretary of State	Johnson 61% - 34%
2014	Attorney General	Schuette 62% - 33%
2016	President	Trump 61% - 33%
2018	Senate	James 58% - 39%
2018	Governor	Schuette 56% - 40%
2018	Attorney General	Leonard 59% - 34%
2020	President	Trump 63% - 35%
2020	Senate	James 63% - 35%
2022	Governor	Dixon 58% - 40%
2022	Secretary of State	Karamo 56% - 42%
2022	Attorney General	DePerno 58% - 39%
2024	President	Trump 64% - 34%
2024	Senate	Rogers 63% - 34%

== History ==
The 2nd congressional district has been associated with the north-central Lake Michigan shoreline region since the 1992 redistricting. There have been some changes, but it still covers in general the same area.

Prior to the 1992 redistricting the 2nd district covered the northern half to two thirds of Livonia, Northville Township, the Wayne County portion of the city of Northville, Plymouth and Plymouth Township all in Wayne County. It also covered most of Washtenaw County but not Ann Arbor or Ypsilanti. The only county entirely in the district was Hillsdale County. Most of Jackson county was in the district, but the some of that county's northern tier townships were in Michigan's 6th congressional district. About half of Lenawee County was in the district, and the far north-east portion of Branch county was also in the district.

In 1992, this district essentially became the 7th district, while the 2nd was redrawn to take in much of the territory of the old 9th district.

The district remained largely unchanged after the 2000 census. After the 2010 census, the district was pushed further into Kent County, taking in Walker, Grandville, Wyoming and Kentwood. The boundary fell just short of the Grand Rapids city limits. At the same time, it lost all of Wexford County, all but a sliver of Mason County, and almost all of its share of Allegan County except the portion of Holland located in the county.

The 2010s redistricting saw the 2nd undergo significant changes. It lost all but one township in Ottawa County, the more built-up areas near Grand Rapids and Muskegon, and the remaining portion of Allegan County. Almost 60 percent of the old 2nd's constituents were drawn into neighboring districts. To make up for this substantial loss in population, it was pushed into more rural and exurban territory to the east, as far as the outer suburbs of Midland, Saginaw and Lansing. It also regained Wexford and Mason counties.

== List of members representing the district ==
Member	Party	Years	Cong ress	Electoral history
District created March 4, 1843
Lucius Lyon (Grand Rapids)	Democratic	March 4, 1843 – March 3, 1845	28th	Elected in 1843. Retired.
John Smith Chipman (Centreville)	Democratic	March 4, 1845 – March 3, 1847	29th	Elected in 1844. Retired.
Edward Bradley (Marshall)	Democratic	March 4, 1847 – August 5, 1847	30th	Elected in 1846. Died.
Vacant		August 5, 1847 – December 6, 1847	30th	
Charles E. Stuart (Kalamazoo)	Democratic	December 6, 1847 – March 3, 1849	30th	Elected finish Bradley's term. Lost re-election.
William Sprague (Kalamazoo)	Whig (Note: William Sprague was elected on a Free Soil Party ticket and was seated with the Whigs in Congress.)	March 4, 1849 – March 3, 1851	31st	Elected in 1848. Retired.
Charles E. Stuart (Kalamazoo)	Democratic	March 4, 1851 – March 3, 1853	32nd	Elected in 1850. Retired to run for U.S. senator.
David A. Noble (Monroe)	Democratic	March 4, 1853 – March 3, 1855	33rd	Elected in 1852. Lost re-election.
Henry Waldron (Hillsdale)	Republican	March 4, 1855 – March 3, 1861	34th 35th 36th	Elected in 1854. Re-elected in 1856. Re-elected in 1858. Retired.
Fernando C. Beaman (Adrian)	Republican	March 4, 1861 – March 3, 1863	37th	Elected in 1860. Redistricted to the 1st district.
Charles Upson (Coldwater)	Republican	March 4, 1863 – March 3, 1869	38th 39th 40th	Elected in 1862. Re-elected in 1864. Re-elected in 1866. Retired.
William L. Stoughton (Sturgis)	Republican	March 4, 1869 – March 3, 1873	41st 42nd	Elected in 1868. Re-elected in 1870. Retired.
Henry Waldron (Hillsdale)	Republican	March 4, 1873 – March 3, 1877	43rd 44th	Redistricted from the 1st district and re-elected in 1872. Re-elected in 1874. Retired.
Edwin Willits (Monroe)	Republican	March 4, 1877 – March 3, 1883	45th 46th 47th	Elected in 1876. Re-elected in 1878. Re-elected in 1880. Retired.
Nathaniel B. Eldredge (Adrian)	Democratic (Note: Nathaniel B. Eldredge was elected on a Democratic and Union ticket in 1884 to the 49th Congress.)	March 4, 1883 – March 3, 1887	48th 49th	Elected in 1882. Re-elected in 1884. Retired.
Edward P. Allen (Ypsilanti)	Republican	March 4, 1887 – March 3, 1891	50th 51st	Elected in 1886. Re-elected in 1888. Lost re-election.
James S. Gorman (Chelsea)	Democratic	March 4, 1891 – March 3, 1895	52nd 53rd	Elected in 1890. Re-elected in 1892. Retired.
George Spalding (Monroe)	Republican	March 4, 1895 – March 3, 1899	54th 55th	Elected in 1894. Re-elected in 1896. Lost renomination.
Henry C. Smith (Adrian)	Republican	March 4, 1899 – March 3, 1903	56th 57th	Elected in 1898. Re-elected in 1900. Lost renomination.
Charles E. Townsend (Jackson)	Republican	March 4, 1903 – March 3, 1911	58th 59th 60th 61st	Elected in 1902. Re-elected in 1904. Re-elected in 1906. Re-elected in 1908. Retired to run for U.S. Senator.
William Wedemeyer (Ann Arbor)	Republican	March 4, 1911 – January 2, 1913	62nd	Elected in 1910. Lost re-election and died before next term began.
Vacant		January 2, 1913 – March 3, 1913	62nd	
Samuel Beakes (Ann Arbor)	Democratic	March 4, 1913 – March 3, 1917	63rd 64th	Elected in 1912. Re-elected in 1914. Lost re-election.
Mark R. Bacon (Wyandotte)	Republican	March 4, 1917 – December 13, 1917	65th	Elected in 1916. Lost election contest. (Note: In the election of November 7, 1916, official returns showed Mark R. Bacon had won by 49 votes. Although there was no provision in state law at that time for recounting ballots in the election of federal officials, a separate examination of votes in Jackson County revealed that Samuel W. Beakes was entitled to 87 more votes. However, the board of state canvassers and the Michigan Supreme Court refused to allow a recount. Finally, the U.S. House Committee on Elections decided to conduct a recount, which gave Beakes the victory by 132 votes. The committee unanimously reported resolutions to the full House stating that Bacon had not been elected to the seat and was not entitled to it, and that, in fact, Beakes was the elected representative of the district. The House seated Beakes on December 13, 1917.)
Samuel Beakes (Ann Arbor)	Democratic	December 13, 1917 – March 3, 1919	65th	Won election contest. Lost re-election.
Earl C. Michener (Adrian)	Republican	March 4, 1919 – March 3, 1933	66th 67th 68th 69th 70th 71st 72nd	Elected in 1918. Re-elected in 1920. Re-elected in 1922. Re-elected in 1924. Re-elected in 1926. Re-elected in 1928. Re-elected in 1930. Lost re-election.
John C. Lehr (Monroe)	Democratic	March 4, 1933 – January 3, 1935	73rd	Elected in 1932. Lost re-election.
Earl C. Michener (Adrian)	Republican	January 3, 1935 – January 3, 1951	74th 75th 76th 77th 78th 79th 80th 81st	Elected in 1934. Re-elected in 1936. Re-elected in 1938. Re-elected in 1940. Re-elected in 1942. Re-elected in 1944. Re-elected in 1946. Re-elected in 1948. Retired.
George Meader (Ann Arbor)	Republican	January 3, 1951 – January 3, 1965	82nd 83rd 84th 85th 86th 87th 88th	Elected in 1950. Re-elected in 1952. Re-elected in 1954. Re-elected in 1956. Re-elected in 1958. Re-elected in 1960. Re-elected in 1962. Lost re-election.
Weston E. Vivian (Ann Arbor)	Democratic	January 3, 1965 – January 3, 1967	89th	Elected in 1964. Lost re-election.
Marvin L. Esch (Ann Arbor)	Republican	January 3, 1967 – January 3, 1977	90th 91st 92nd 93rd 94th	Elected in 1966. Re-elected in 1968. Re-elected in 1970. Re-elected in 1972. Re-elected in 1974. Retired to run for U.S. Senator.
Carl Pursell (Plymouth)	Republican	January 3, 1977 – January 3, 1993	95th 96th 97th 98th 99th 100th 101st 102nd	Elected in 1976. Re-elected in 1978. Re-elected in 1980. Re-elected in 1982. Re-elected in 1984. Re-elected in 1986. Re-elected in 1988. Re-elected in 1990. Retired.
Pete Hoekstra (Holland)	Republican	January 3, 1993 – January 3, 2011	103rd 104th 105th 106th 107th 108th 109th 110th 111th	Elected in 1992. Re-elected in 1994. Re-elected in 1996. Re-elected in 1998. Re-elected in 2000. Re-elected in 2002. Re-elected in 2004. Re-elected in 2006. Re-elected in 2008. Retired to run for Governor of Michigan.
Bill Huizenga (Holland)	Republican	January 3, 2011 – January 3, 2023	112th 113th 114th 115th 116th 117th	Elected in 2010. Re-elected in 2012. Re-elected in 2014. Re-elected in 2016. Re-elected in 2018. Re-elected in 2020. Redistricted to the 4th district.
John Moolenaar (Caledonia)	Republican	January 3, 2023 – present	118th 119th	Redistricted from the 4th district and re-elected in 2022. Re-elected in 2024. Re-elected in 2026.

== Recent election results ==
=== 2012 ===
Michigan's 2nd congressional district, 2012
Party	Candidate	Votes	%
Republican	Bill Huizenga (incumbent)	194,653	61.2
Democratic	Willie German, Jr.	108,973	34.2
Libertarian	Mary Buzuma	8,750	2.6
U.S. Taxpayers'	Ronald Graeser	3,176	1.1
Green	William Opalicky	2,715	0.9
Total votes		318,267	100.0
Republican hold			

=== 2014 ===
Michigan's 2nd congressional district, 2014
Party	Candidate	Votes	%
Republican	Bill Huizenga (incumbent)	135,568	63.6
Democratic	Dean Vanderstelt	70,851	33.3
Libertarian	Ronald Welch II	3,877	1.8
U.S. Taxpayers'	Ronald Graeser	2,776	1.3
Total votes		213,072	100.0
Republican hold			

=== 2016 ===
Michigan's 2nd congressional district, 2016
Party	Candidate	Votes	%
Republican	Bill Huizenga (incumbent)	212,508	62.6
Democratic	Dennis Murphy	110,391	32.5
Libertarian	Erwin Haas	8,154	2.4
Green	Matthew A. Brady	5,353	1.6
U.S. Taxpayers'	Ronald Graeser	2,904	0.9
Independent	Joshua Arnold (write-in)	18	0.0
Total votes		339,328	100.0
Republican hold			

=== 2018 ===
Michigan's 2nd congressional district, 2018
Party	Candidate	Votes	%
Republican	Bill Huizenga (incumbent)	168,970	55.3
Democratic	Rob Davidson	131,254	43.0
U.S. Taxpayers'	Ron Graeser	5,239	1.7
Total votes		305,463	100.0
Republican hold			

=== 2020 ===
Michigan's 2nd congressional district, 2020
Party	Candidate	Votes	%
Republican	Bill Huizenga (incumbent)	238,711	59.2
Democratic	Bryan Berghoef	154,122	38.2
Libertarian	Max Riekse	5,292	1.3
Green	Jean-Michel Crevière	2,646	0.7
U.S. Taxpayers'	Gerald Van Sickle	2,476	0.6
Total votes		403,247	100.0
Republican hold			

=== 2022 ===
Michigan's 2nd congressional district, 2022
Party	Candidate	Votes	%
Republican	John Moolenaar (incumbent)	216,222	63.6
Democratic	Jerry Hilliard	116,452	34.3
Libertarian	Nathan Hewer	6,847	2.0
Total votes		339,521	100.0
Republican hold			

=== 2024 ===
Michigan's 2nd congressional district, 2024
Party	Candidate	Votes	%
Republican	John Moolenaar (incumbent)	279,167	65.1
Democratic	Michael Lynch	135,824	31.7
Libertarian	Ben DeJong	7,037	1.6
Constitution	Scott Adams	6,522	1.5
Total votes		428,550	100.0
Republican hold			

== Historical district boundaries ==
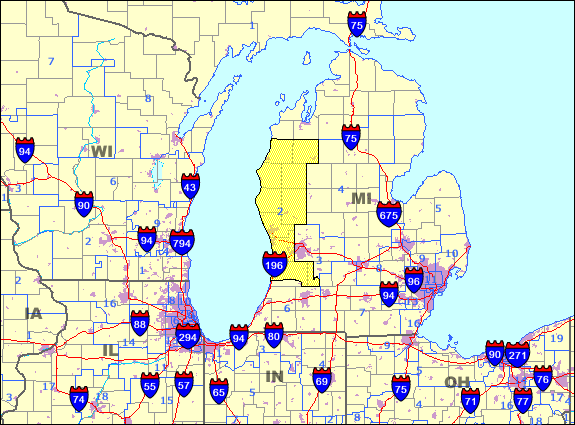
1993–2003

2003–2013

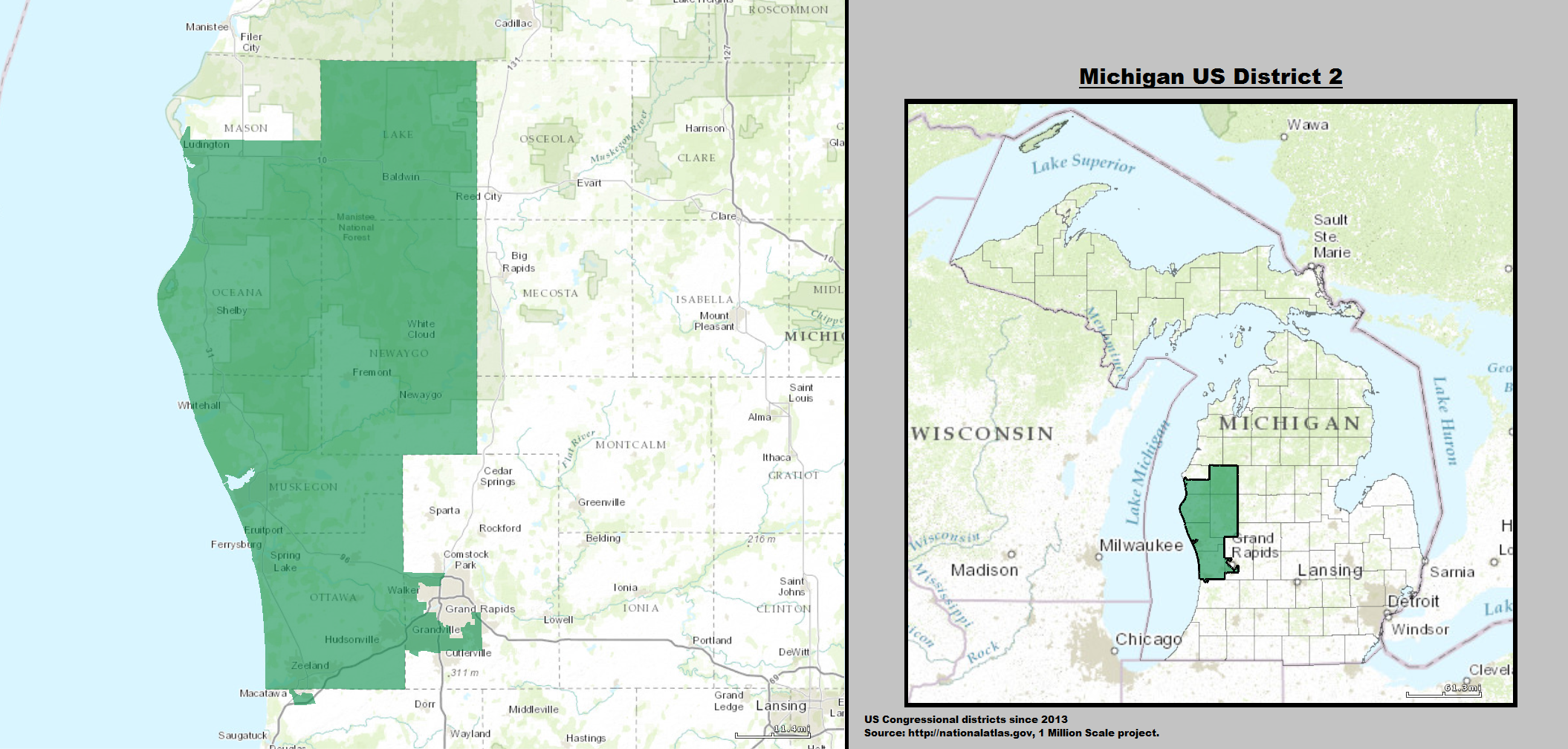
2013–2023

== See also ==
- Michigan's congressional districts
- List of United States congressional districts
