= List of Michigan State Historic Sites in Wexford County =

Location of Wexford County in Michigan

The following is a list of Michigan State Historic Sites in Wexford County, Michigan. Sites marked with a dagger (†) are also listed on the National Register of Historic Places in Wexford County, Michigan.

== Current listings ==
Name	Image	Location	City	Listing date
Battle of Manton Informational Designation		Rotary Park, US-131 south of Griswald Street	Manton	June 18, 1970
Caberfae Ski Resort Company Informational Site		Caberfae Road	Cadillac vicinity	November 1, 1988
Cadillac City Hall†		201 North Mitchell Street	Cadillac	June 23, 1983
Cadillac Public Library†		127 Beech Street	Cadillac	November 2, 1980
Clam Lake Canal		NE of 6093 M-115	Cadillac	March 16, 1989
Cobbs and Mitchell Mill No. 1 Site Informational Site		329 South Street at Lake Cadillac	Cadillac	June 10, 1987
Cobbs and Mitchell, Inc., Building		100 East Chapin	Cadillac	February 27, 1980
Frank J. Cobbs House†		407 East Chapin Street	Cadillac	September 25, 1985
First Wexford County Courthouse Informational Site		Northwest corner of State and Manistee streets	Sherman	February 28, 1969
Greenwood Disciples of Christ Church		7303 N 35 Mile Road	Greenwood Township	March 15, 1990
Lumbering Industry		US-131, north of Manton	Manton vicinity	July 18, 1956
Manton Fire Barn and City Hall		Southeast corner of West Main and State Street	Manton	July 26, 1978
Charles T. Mitchell House†		118 North Shelby Street	Cadillac	July 23, 1987
Shay Locomotive†		Cass Street, in the city park	Cadillac	August 3, 1979

== See also ==
- National Register of Historic Places listings in Wexford County, Michigan

== Sources ==
- Historic Sites Online – Wexford County. Michigan State Housing Developmental Authority. Accessed January 23, 2011.
