= Wexford County, Michigan =

County in Michigan, United States

- County
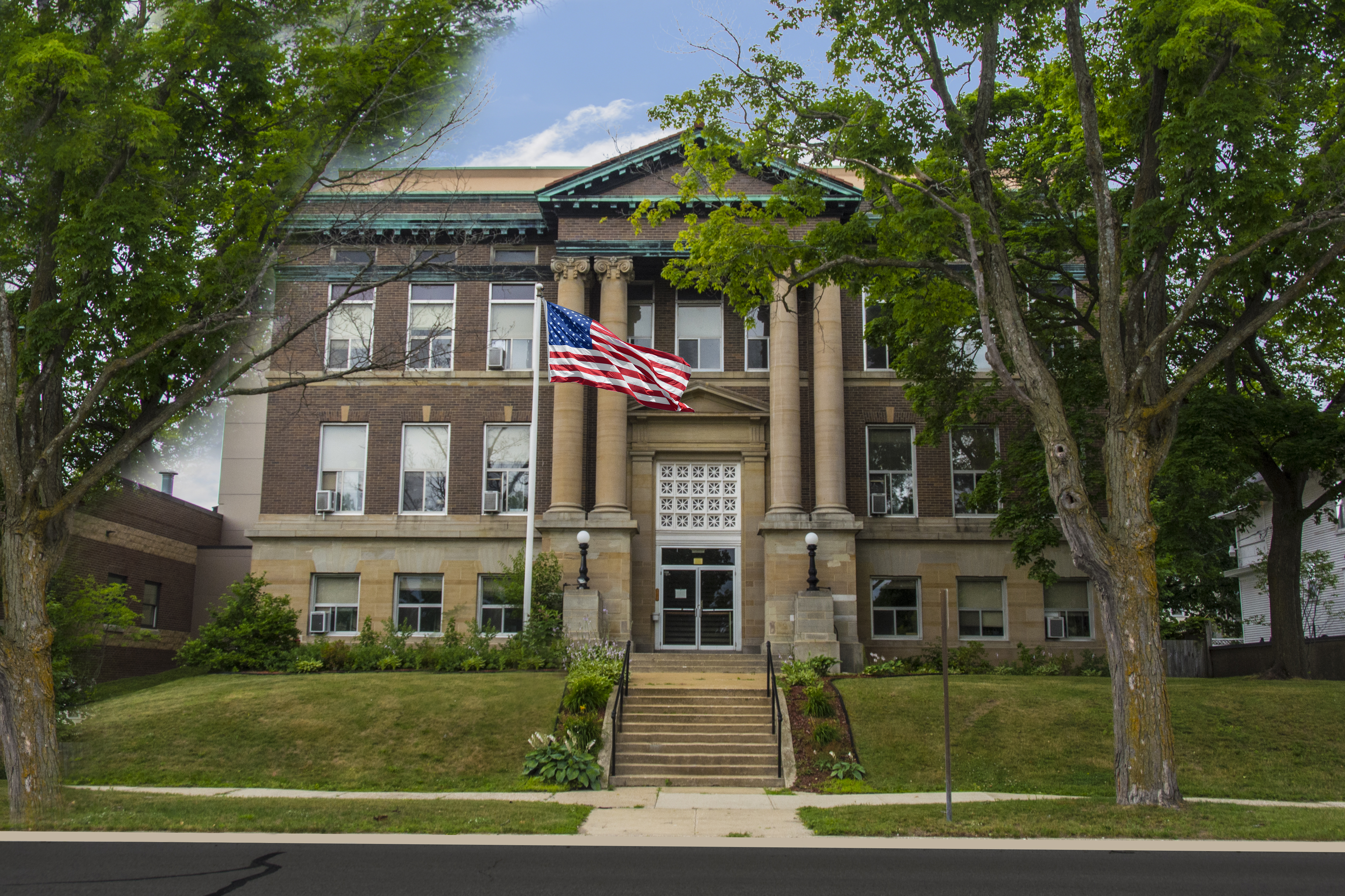
- Wexford County Courthouse in Cadillac

- Flag Seal
- Nickname: "The Wex"
- Location within the U.S. state of Michigan
- Coordinates: 44°20′N 85°35′W
- Country: United States
- State: Michigan
- Created: 1840
- Organized: 1869
- Named for: County Wexford, Ireland
- Seat: Cadillac
- Largest city: Cadillac

Area
  - Total: 575.46 sq mi (1,490.4 km^{2})
  - Land: 565.00 sq mi (1,463.3 km^{2})
  - Water: 10.46 sq mi (27.1 km^{2}) 1.8%

Population (2020)
  - Total: 33,673
  - Estimate (2025): 34,445 ▲
  - Density: 59.598/sq mi (23.011/km^{2})
- Time zone: UTC−5 (Eastern)
  - Summer (DST): UTC−4 (EDT)
- Congressional districts: 1st, 2nd
- Website: www.wexfordcounty.org

Wexford County is a county in the Northern Lower Peninsula of the U.S. state of Michigan. As of the 2020 United States census, the population was 33,673. The seat of Wexford County is Cadillac, which is also the county's largest city.

Wexford County is largely covered by the Manistee National Forest, and thus is heavily wooded. The Manistee River flows from east to west in the north of the county. Briar Hill, the highest point in Michigan's Lower Peninsula, is located in northwestern Wexford County, at 1,706 feet (520 m).

The county is the location of the first known sighting of the Michigan Dogman, in 1887.

== History ==
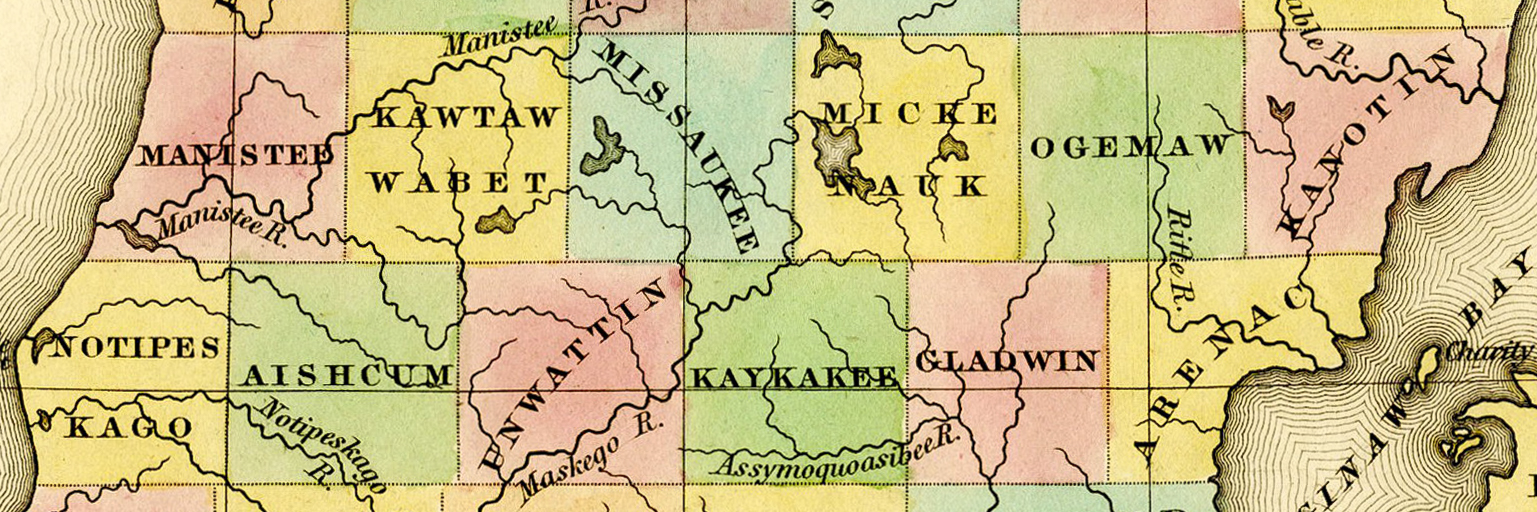
A detail from A New Map of Michigan with its Canals, Roads & Distances (1842) by Henry Schenck Tanner, showing Wexford County as "Kawtawwabet" (a misspelling of Kautawaubet, the county's name from 1840 to 1843.) Several nearby counties are also shown with names that would later be changed.

The county was established by the Michigan Legislature in 1840 as Kautawaubet County, from gaa-dawaabide meaning "broken tooth" in the Anishinaabe language, which was the name of a local Potawatomi chief. In 1843, legislators renamed the county Wexford, after County Wexford in Ireland.

In 1851, Wexford County was attached to Grand Traverse County for administrative purposes. It was then attached to Manistee County in 1855, before being organized on its own in 1869.

=== County seat battle ===
The Wexford County seat of government, originally located in Sherman, was moved to Manton in 1881, as the result of a compromise between the feuding residents of Cadillac and Sherman. Cadillac partisans, however, won the county seat by a county-wide vote in April 1882. The day following the election, a sheriff's posse left the city for Manton by special train to seize the county records. After they arrived and collected a portion of the materials, however, an angry crowd confronted the Cadillac men and drove them out of town.

When the sheriff returned to Cadillac, he encountered a force consisting of several hundred armed men; this group reportedly included a brass band. The Sheriff's force, some of whom may have been intoxicated, traveled back to Manton to seize the remaining records. Although Manton residents confronted the Cadillac men and barricaded the courthouse, the posse successfully seized the documents. They returned to Cadillac in dubious glory.

== Geography ==
The Manistee River flows westward through the upper part of Wexford County. The county terrain consists of low rolling hills, largely tree-covered. The terrain slopes to the west, with its highest point, Briar Hill in Manistee National Forest at 1,706 feet (520 m).

According to the US Census Bureau, the county has a total area of 575.46 sqmi (1,490 km^{2}), of which 565.00 sqmi (1,463 km^{2}) is land and 10.46 sqmi (27.1 km^{2}) (1.8%) is water.

=== Adjacent counties ===
- Grand Traverse County – north
- Kalkaska County – northeast
- Missaukee County – east
- Osceola County – southeast
- Lake County – southwest
- Manistee County – west
- Benzie County – northwest

=== Protected areas ===
- Brandy Brook Waterfowl Area
- Manistee National Forest (part)
- Mitchell State Park

=== Lakes ===
- Hodenpyl Dam Pond
- Lake Cadillac
- Lake Gitchegumee
- Lake Mitchell
- Long Lake
- Round Lake (part)

=== Major highways ===
- US 131 is a north–south highway that runs in the east of the county. Much of the highway within Wexford County is a freeway, including bypasses of Cadillac and Manton. South of Wexford County, the highway can be used to access Reed City, Big Rapids, Grand Rapids, and Kalamazoo. North of Wexford County, the highway, as a two-lane road, can be used to access Kalkaska and Petoskey.
- Bus. US 131 is a business route serving downtown Cadillac. The route was created in 2001 with the completion of the US 131 freeway on the east side of Cadillac.
- Bus. US 131 is a business route serving downtown Manton. The route was created in 2003 with the completion of the US 131 freeway on the east side of Manton.
- M-37 is a north–south route in the west of the county. The highway runs through the villages of Mesick and Buckley. South of Wexford County, the highway can be used to access Baldwin, White Cloud, and Newaygo. North of Wexford County, the highway can be used to access Traverse City.
- M-42 is an east–west highway in the northeast of the county. The route begins in Manton, and continues east into Missaukee County, where it can be used to access Lake City. Prior to 2007, the highway continued west from Manton to M-37 near Mesick.
- M-55 is an east–west route that runs in the south of the county. The highway passes to the south and east of Cadillac, concurrent at points with US 131 and M-115. West of Wexford County, the highway can be used to access Manistee. East of Wexford County, the highway can be used to access Lake City and Houghton Lake.
- M-115 is a diagonal northwest–southeast highway. The highway passes through the village of Mesick and passes southwest of Cadillac. Northwest of Wexford County, the highway can be used to access Copemish and Frankfort. Southeast of Wexford County, the highway can be used to access Clare.

== Communities ==
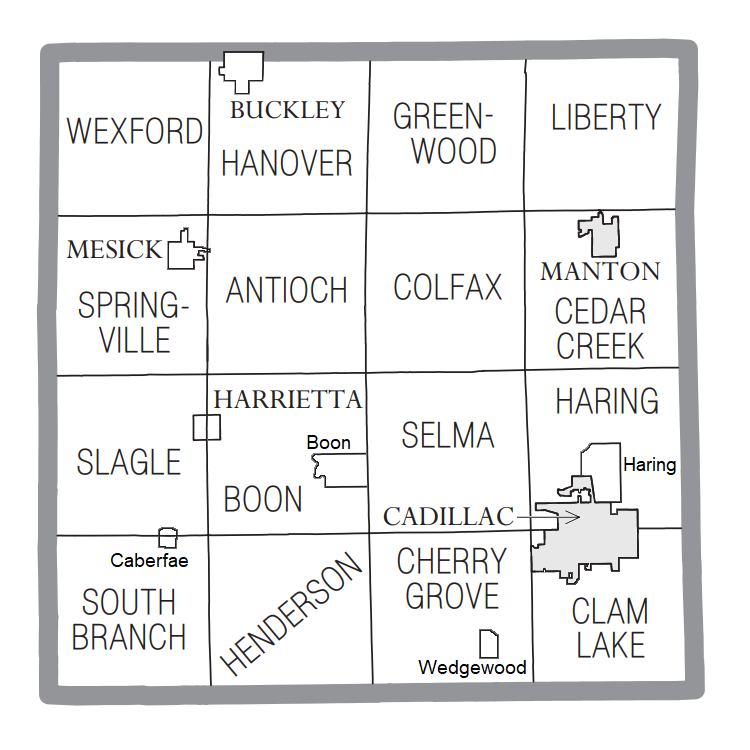
U.S. Census data map showing local municipal boundaries within Wexford County, as well as CDP boundaries. Shaded areas represent incorporated cities.

=== Cities ===
- Cadillac (county seat)
- Manton

=== Villages ===
- Buckley
- Harrietta
- Mesick

=== Charter township ===
- Haring Charter Township

=== Civil townships ===
- Antioch Township
- Boon Township
- Cedar Creek Township
- Cherry Grove Township
- Clam Lake Township
- Colfax Township
- Greenwood Township
- Hanover Township
- Henderson Township
- Liberty Township
- Selma Township
- Slagle Township
- South Branch Township
- Springville Township
- Wexford Township

=== Census-designated places ===
- Boon
- Caberfae
- Haring
- Wedgewood

=== Other unincorporated communities ===
- Axin
- Bagnall
- Baxter
- Benson
- Garletts Corner
- Gilbert
- Glengary
- Harlan
- Hobart
- Hoxeyville
- Meauwataka
- Millersville
- Missaukee Junction
- Sherman
- Wexford Corner
- Yuma

=== Ghost towns ===
- Angola
- Bond's Mill
- Bunyea
- Cherry Grove
- Claggettville
- Coline
- Elton
- Haire
- Mystic
- Round Lake
- Soper
- Thorp
- Wexford

== Demographics ==
Historical population
| Census | Pop. | Note | %± |
|---|---|---|---|
| 1870 | 650 | | — |
| 1880 | 6,815 | | 948.5% |
| 1890 | 11,278 | | 65.5% |
| 1900 | 16,845 | | 49.4% |
| 1910 | 20,769 | | 23.3% |
| 1920 | 18,207 | | −12.3% |
| 1930 | 16,827 | | −7.6% |
| 1940 | 17,976 | | 6.8% |
| 1950 | 18,628 | | 3.6% |
| 1960 | 18,466 | | −0.9% |
| 1970 | 19,717 | | 6.8% |
| 1980 | 25,102 | | 27.3% |
| 1990 | 26,360 | | 5.0% |
| 2000 | 30,484 | | 15.6% |
| 2010 | 32,735 | | 7.4% |
| 2020 | 33,673 | | 2.9% |
| 2025 (est.) | 34,445 | ▲ | 2.3% |
US Decennial Census; 1790–1960 1900–1990; 1990–2000 2010–2018

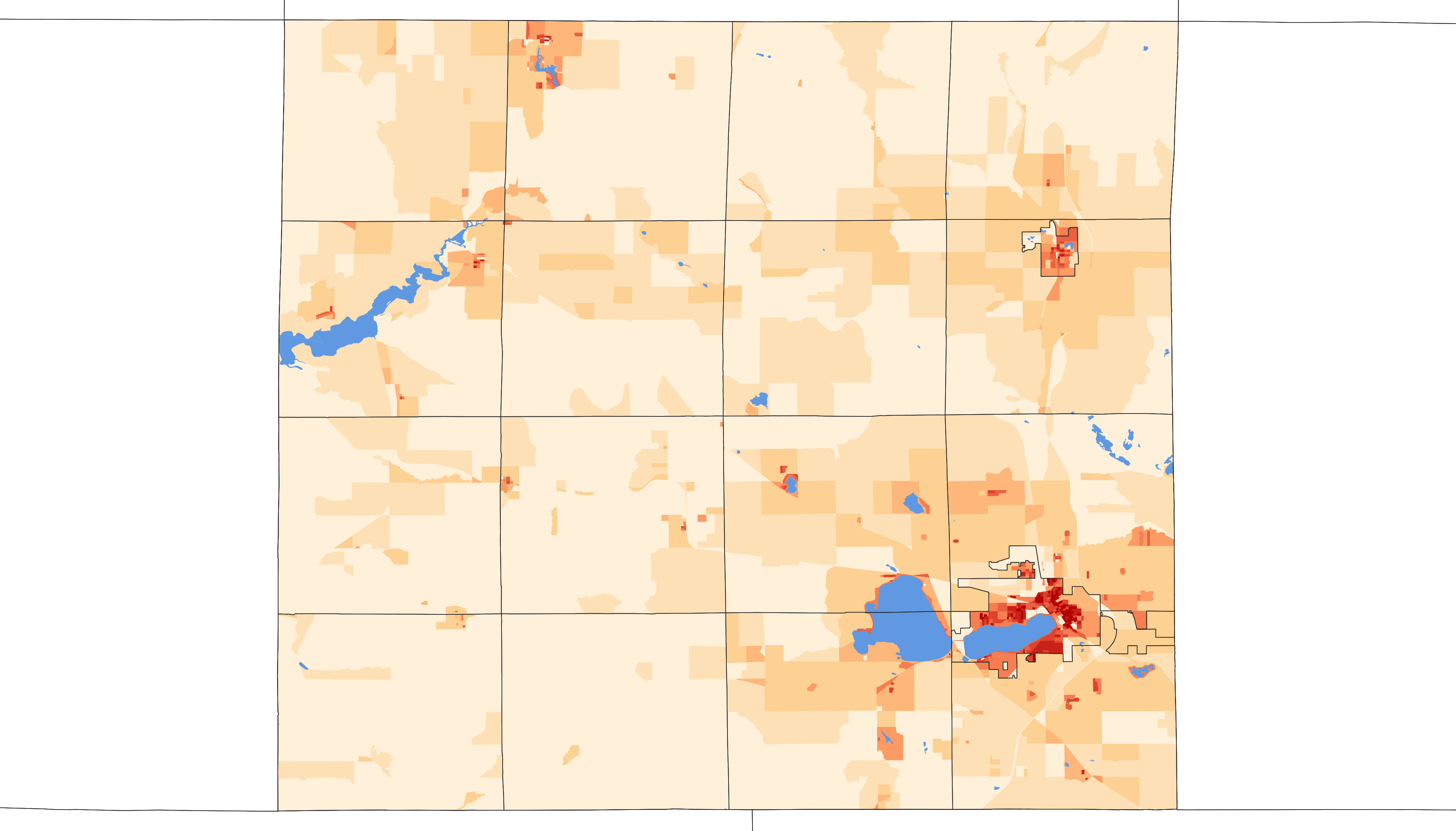
2020 population density of Wexford County MI by census block

=== Racial and ethnic composition ===
Wexford County, Michigan – Racial and ethnic composition Note: the US Census treats Hispanic/Latino as an ethnic category. This table excludes Latinos from the racial categories and assigns them to a separate category. Hispanics/Latinos may be of any race.
| Race / Ethnicity (NH = Non-Hispanic) | Pop 1980 | Pop 1990 | Pop 2000 | Pop 2010 | Pop 2020 | % 1980 | % 1990 | % 2000 | % 2010 | % 2020 |
|---|---|---|---|---|---|---|---|---|---|---|
| White alone (NH) | 24,802 | 25,921 | 29,469 | 31,246 | 30,783 | 98.80% | 98.33% | 96.67% | 95.45% | 91.42% |
| Black or African American alone (NH) | 12 | 33 | 54 | 122 | 187 | 0.05% | 0.13% | 0.18% | 0.37% | 0.56% |
| Native American or Alaska Native alone (NH) | 85 | 172 | 215 | 189 | 163 | 0.34% | 0.65% | 0.71% | 0.58% | 0.48% |
| Asian alone (NH) | 48 | 80 | 126 | 193 | 186 | 0.19% | 0.30% | 0.41% | 0.59% | 0.55% |
| Native Hawaiian or Pacific Islander alone (NH) | x | x | 6 | 18 | 1 | x | x | 0.02% | 0.05% | 0.00% |
| Other race alone (NH) | 21 | 1 | 13 | 24 | 112 | 0.08% | 0.00% | 0.04% | 0.07% | 0.33% |
| Mixed race or Multiracial (NH) | x | x | 294 | 424 | 1,451 | x | x | 0.96% | 1.30% | 4.31% |
| Hispanic or Latino (any race) | 134 | 153 | 307 | 519 | 790 | 0.53% | 0.58% | 1.01% | 1.59% | 2.35% |
| Total | 25,102 | 26,360 | 30,484 | 32,735 | 33,673 | 100.00% | 100.00% | 100.00% | 100.00% | 100.00% |

=== 2020 census ===
As of the 2020 census, the county had a population of 33,673. The median age was 42.0 years. 23.1% of residents were under the age of 18 and 20.1% of residents were 65 years of age or older. For every 100 females there were 99.6 males, and for every 100 females age 18 and over there were 98.1 males age 18 and over.

The racial makeup of the county was 92.4% White, 0.6% Black or African American, 0.5% American Indian and Alaska Native, 0.6% Asian, <0.1% Native Hawaiian and Pacific Islander, 0.7% from some other race, and 5.2% from two or more races. Hispanic or Latino residents of any race comprised 2.3% of the population.

36.3% of residents lived in urban areas, while 63.7% lived in rural areas.

There were 13,610 households in the county, of which 28.5% had children under the age of 18 living in them. Of all households, 47.5% were married-couple households, 19.5% were households with a male householder and no spouse or partner present, and 24.1% were households with a female householder and no spouse or partner present. About 28.0% of all households were made up of individuals and 13.0% had someone living alone who was 65 years of age or older.

There were 16,418 housing units, of which 17.1% were vacant. Among occupied housing units, 75.8% were owner-occupied and 24.2% were renter-occupied. The homeowner vacancy rate was 1.5% and the rental vacancy rate was 6.7%.

== Government ==
The county government operates the jail, maintains rural roads, operates the major local courts, keeps files of deeds and mortgages, maintains vital records, administers public health regulations, and participates with the state in the provision of welfare and other social services. The county board of commissioners controls the budget but has only limited authority to make laws or ordinances. In Michigan, most local government functions — police and fire, building and zoning, tax assessment, street maintenance, etc. — are the responsibility of individual cities and townships.

=== Elected officials ===
- Prosecuting Attorney: Corey Wiggins
- Sheriff: Trent Taylor
- County Clerk: Alaina M. Nyman
- County Treasurer: Kristi Nottingham
- Register of Deeds: Lorie L. Sorensen
- Drain Commissioner: Michael J. Solomon
- County Surveyor: Craig J. Pullen

(information as of July 2019)

== Politics ==
Wexford County is one of the few counties to have given majorities to both the first Republican candidate, John C. Frémont, and to John McCain in his 2008 presidential campaign. The county also twice favored Democrat Bill Clinton.

Wexford County is divided between Michigan's 1st and 2nd congressional districts, both represented by Republicans Jack Bergman and John Moolenaar, respectively.

United States presidential election results for Wexford County, Michigan
| Year | Republican | | Democratic | | Third party(ies) | |
| Year | No. | % | No. | % | No. | % |
|---|---|---|---|---|---|---|
| 1884 | 1,220 | 54.81% | 876 | 39.35% | 130 | 5.84% |
| 1888 | 1,437 | 53.96% | 1,065 | 39.99% | 161 | 6.05% |
| 1892 | 1,388 | 49.91% | 1,156 | 41.57% | 237 | 8.52% |
| 1896 | 2,036 | 58.27% | 1,359 | 38.90% | 99 | 2.83% |
| 1900 | 2,519 | 67.75% | 1,014 | 27.27% | 185 | 4.98% |
| 1904 | 3,003 | 76.37% | 690 | 17.55% | 239 | 6.08% |
| 1908 | 2,886 | 71.95% | 831 | 20.72% | 294 | 7.33% |
| 1912 | 1,075 | 26.52% | 817 | 20.15% | 2,162 | 53.33% |
| 1916 | 2,333 | 55.21% | 1,683 | 39.82% | 210 | 4.97% |
| 1920 | 3,406 | 73.03% | 1,095 | 23.48% | 163 | 3.49% |
| 1924 | 3,926 | 77.47% | 592 | 11.68% | 550 | 10.85% |
| 1928 | 4,825 | 84.53% | 853 | 14.94% | 30 | 0.53% |
| 1932 | 3,425 | 50.34% | 3,251 | 47.78% | 128 | 1.88% |
| 1936 | 3,153 | 44.35% | 3,771 | 53.05% | 185 | 2.60% |
| 1940 | 4,322 | 59.00% | 2,947 | 40.23% | 57 | 0.78% |
| 1944 | 4,074 | 61.21% | 2,489 | 37.39% | 93 | 1.40% |
| 1948 | 3,833 | 57.06% | 2,635 | 39.23% | 249 | 3.71% |
| 1952 | 5,569 | 68.98% | 2,407 | 29.82% | 97 | 1.20% |
| 1956 | 5,052 | 65.76% | 2,604 | 33.89% | 27 | 0.35% |
| 1960 | 5,262 | 65.00% | 2,807 | 34.67% | 27 | 0.33% |
| 1964 | 3,016 | 40.50% | 4,414 | 59.28% | 16 | 0.21% |
| 1968 | 4,364 | 56.38% | 2,832 | 36.59% | 544 | 7.03% |
| 1972 | 5,221 | 61.43% | 3,048 | 35.86% | 230 | 2.71% |
| 1976 | 5,670 | 54.96% | 4,519 | 43.80% | 128 | 1.24% |
| 1980 | 6,027 | 54.01% | 4,173 | 37.39% | 960 | 8.60% |
| 1984 | 7,279 | 67.93% | 3,398 | 31.71% | 38 | 0.35% |
| 1988 | 6,043 | 58.07% | 4,287 | 41.20% | 76 | 0.73% |
| 1992 | 4,696 | 37.34% | 4,894 | 38.92% | 2,985 | 23.74% |
| 1996 | 4,866 | 40.93% | 5,510 | 46.35% | 1,512 | 12.72% |
| 2000 | 7,215 | 55.58% | 5,326 | 41.03% | 441 | 3.40% |
| 2004 | 8,966 | 59.14% | 6,034 | 39.80% | 160 | 1.06% |
| 2008 | 8,044 | 51.10% | 7,379 | 46.88% | 318 | 2.02% |
| 2012 | 8,450 | 56.72% | 6,184 | 41.51% | 264 | 1.77% |
| 2016 | 10,000 | 65.06% | 4,436 | 28.86% | 934 | 6.08% |
| 2020 | 12,102 | 66.16% | 5,838 | 31.92% | 352 | 1.92% |
| 2024 | 12,968 | 66.58% | 6,224 | 31.96% | 284 | 1.46% |

United States Senate election results for Wexford County, Michigan1
| Year | Republican | | Democratic | | Third party(ies) | |
| Year | No. | % | No. | % | No. | % |
|---|---|---|---|---|---|---|
| 2024 | 12,457 | 64.83% | 6,063 | 31.56% | 694 | 3.61% |

Michigan Gubernatorial election results for Wexford County
| Year | Republican | | Democratic | | Third party(ies) | |
| Year | No. | % | No. | % | No. | % |
|---|---|---|---|---|---|---|
| 2022 | 9,131 | 60.45% | 5,645 | 37.37% | 329 | 2.18% |

== Tourism ==
There are many attractions and hot spots in Wexford County. The Manistee National Forest is one recreation site. The Manistee River is used by fishermen, kayakers, and canoers. There are many lakes; the largest are Cadillac and Mitchell. Two hundred miles of snowmobile trails are maintained by the Cadillac Winter Promotions volunteer group. There are at least eight golf courses near Cadillac. There are several museums near Cadillac. The Wexford Civic Center is a 4,000 capacity arena, 300 capacity hockey facility, 300 capacity grand stand, and several buildings for agricultural shows and expos.

== Education ==
The Wexford–Missaukee Intermediate School District, based in Cadillac, services the school districts in the county (with the exception of Buckley Community Schools, which is covered by Northwest Educational Services). The intermediate school district offers regional special education services and technical career programs to students of its districts.

Wexford County is served by the following regular public school districts:

- Buckley Community Schools
- Cadillac Area Public Schools
- Manton Consolidated Schools
- Mesick Consolidated Schools

The county also has one charter school, the Highpoint Virtual Academy of Michigan.

Wexford County has the following private schools:

- Cadillac Heritage Christian School
- Northview Adventist School (Seventh-Day Adventist)
- St. Ann School (Catholic)

== Historical markers ==
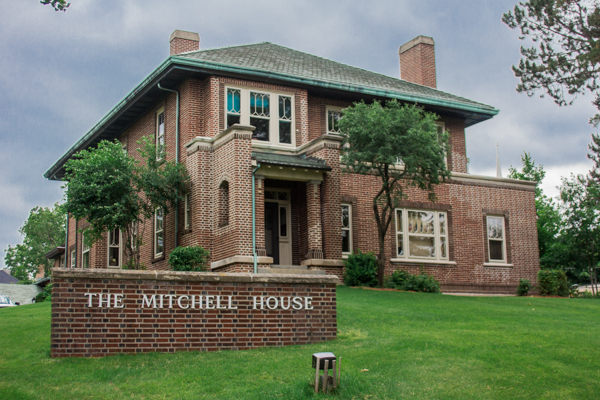
Charles T. Mitchell House in Cadillac

There are several recognized Michigan historical markers in the county:

- Battle of Manton
- Caberfae Ski Resort
- Cadillac Carnegie Library
- Charles T. Mitchell House
- Clam Lake Canal
- Cobbs & Mitchell Building
- Cobbs and Mitchell Mill No.1
- First Wexford County Courthouse
- Greenwood Disciples of Christ Church
- Shay Locomotive

== See also ==
- List of Michigan State Historic Sites in Wexford County
- National Register of Historic Places listings in Wexford County, Michigan
