= Selma Township, Michigan =

- Civil township
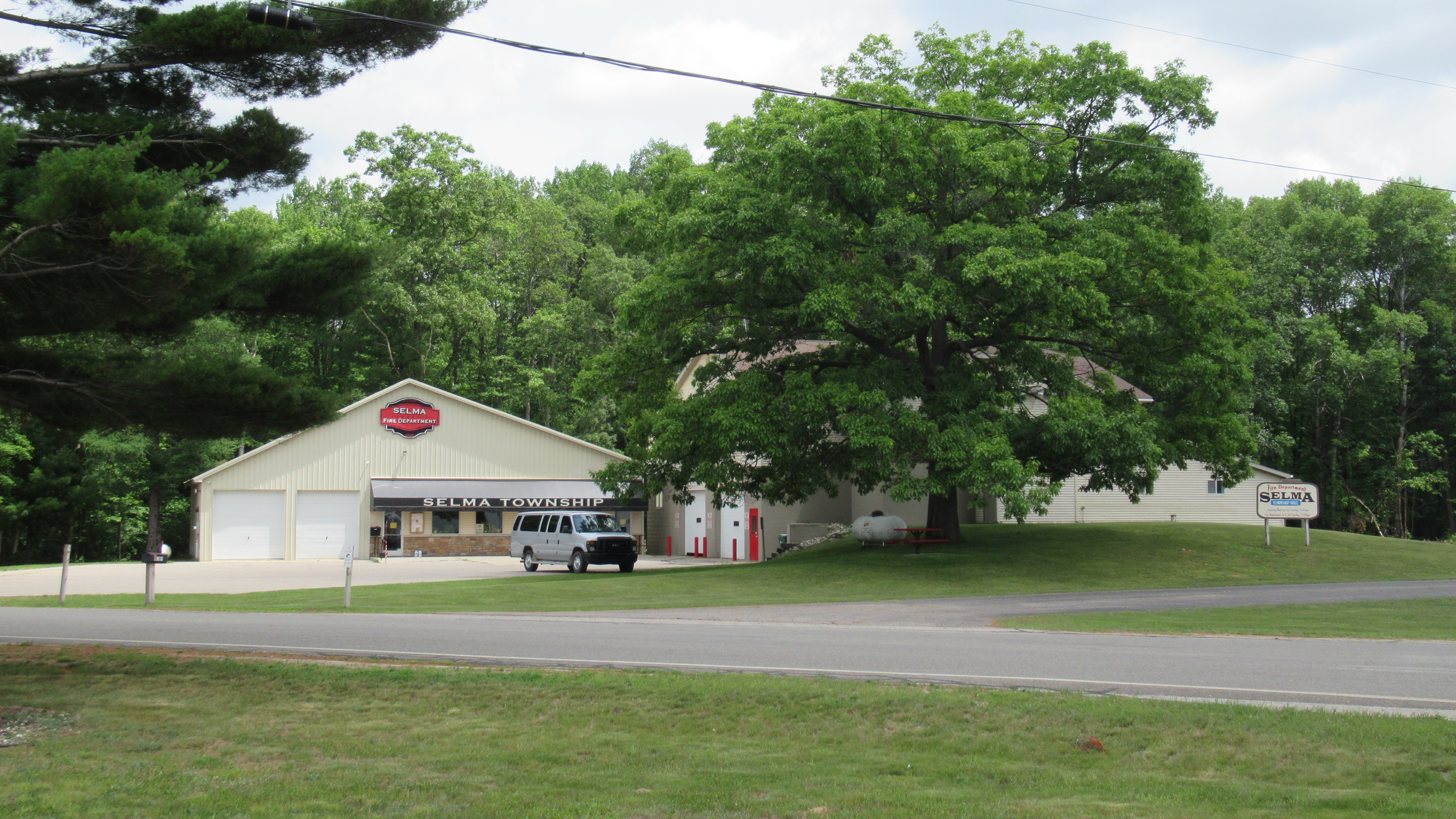
- Selma Township Hall and Fire Department

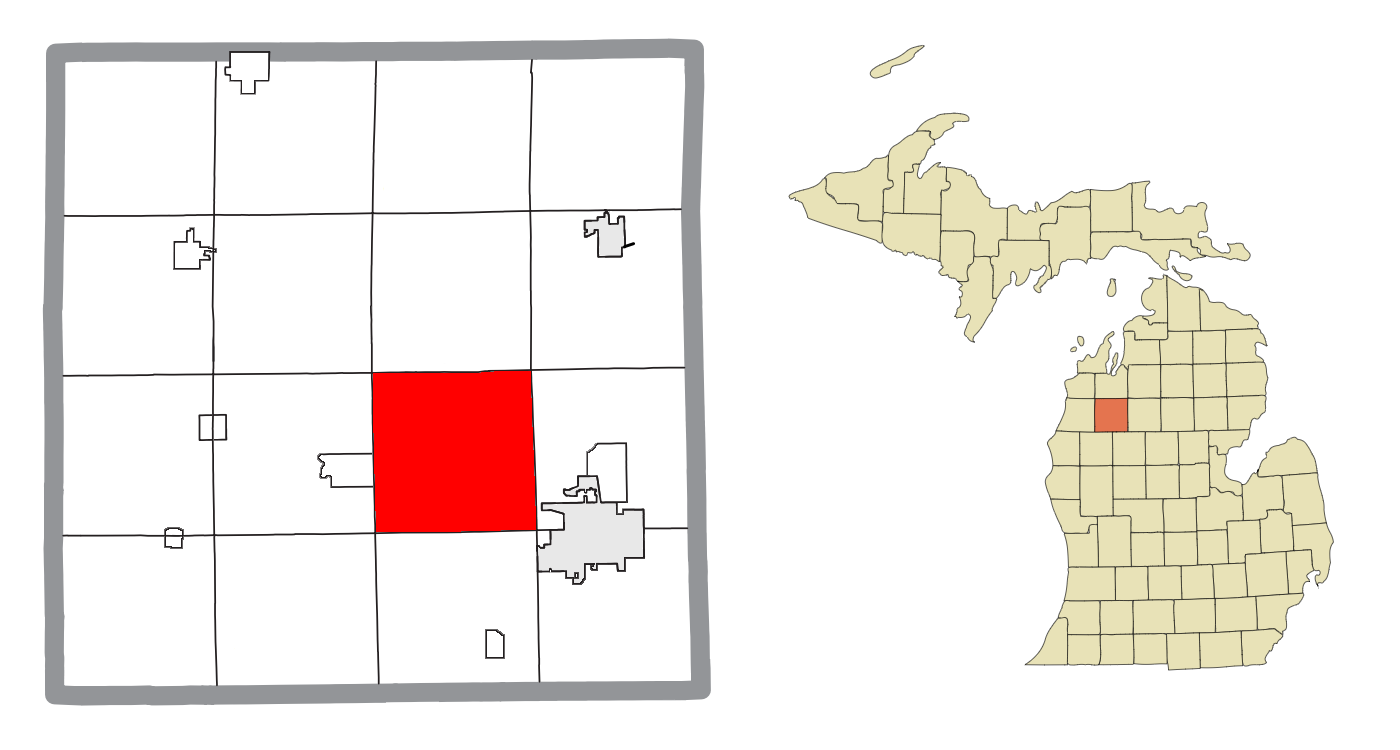
- Location within Wexford County

- Location within the state of Michigan Location within the United States
- Coordinates: 44°17′39″N 85°30′45″W
- Country: United States
- State: Michigan
- County: Wexford
- Established: 1871

Government
  - Supervisor: Mike Boyd
  - Clerk: Carol Perrin

Area
  - Total: 35.99 sq mi (93.21 km^{2})
  - Land: 34.31 sq mi (88.86 km^{2})
  - Water: 1.68 sq mi (4.35 km^{2})
- Elevation: 1,375 ft (419 m)

Population (2020)
  - Total: 2,233
  - Density: 65.08/sq mi (25.13/km^{2})
- Time zone: UTC-5 (Eastern (EST))
  - Summer (DST): UTC-4 (EDT)
- ZIP code(s): 49601 (Cadillac); 49618 (Boon)
- Area code: 231
- FIPS code: 26-72380
- GNIS feature ID: 1627057
- Website: Official website

Selma Township is a civil township of Wexford County in the U.S. state of Michigan. The population was 2,233 at the 2020 census.

== Communities ==
- Bunyea is a former settlement within the township. It began as a station along the Ann Arbor Railroad, and the community grew around the Sturtevant & Bunyea sawmill. A post office opened under the name Bunyea on September 8, 1903, and operated until December 15, 1913.
- Millersville is an unincorporated community within the township at 44°16′36″N 85°33′35″W. The community was settled along the Toledo, Ann Arbor & Northern Michigan Railroad around 1888 and was named after local storekeeper Humphrey Miller, who also became the first postmaster when a post office opened on March 8, 1890. The post office operated until March 30, 1895.

== History ==
The township was first proposed in 1870 under the name Thorp Township. It was not officially established until March 12, 1871, when it was set aside from the southern half of Colfax Township and renamed Selma Township.

== Geography ==
According to the U.S. Census Bureau, the township has a total area of 35.99 square miles (93.21 km^{2}), of which 34.31 square miles (88.86 km^{2}) is land and 1.68 square miles (4.35 km^{2}) (4.67%) is water.

The northern portion of Lake Mitchell is located within the township.

=== Major highways ===
- M-115 runs south–north diagonally through the center of the township.

== Demographics ==
As of the census of 2000, there were 1,915 people, 757 households, and 548 families residing in the township. The population density was 55.6 inhabitants per square mile (21.5/km^{2}). There were 1,086 housing units at an average density of 31.5 units per square mile (12.2 units/km^{2}). The racial makeup of the township was 97.13% White, 0.63% Native American, 0.99% Asian, 0.10% Pacific Islander, 0.31% from other races, and 0.84% from two or more races. Hispanic or Latino of any race were 0.68% of the population.

There were 757 households, out of which 32.6% had children under the age of 18 living with them, 60.1% were married couples living together, 7.7% had a female householder with no husband present, and 27.6% were non-families. 22.5% of all households were made up of individuals, and 8.5% had someone living alone who was 65 years of age or older. The average household size was 2.50 and the average family size was 2.91.

In the township the population was spread out, with 25.3% under the age of 18, 6.6% from 18 to 24, 30.0% from 25 to 44, 25.2% from 45 to 64, and 12.8% who were 65 years of age or older. The median age was 38 years. For every 100 females, there were 107.5 males. For every 100 females age 18 and over, there were 103.8 males.

The median income for a household in the township was $37,287, and the median income for a family was $41,641. Males had a median income of $31,103 versus $22,074 for females. The per capita income for the township was $19,873. About 5.5% of families and 8.1% of the population were below the poverty line, including 8.5% of those under age 18 and 6.7% of those age 65 or over.

== Education ==
Selma Township is served by two public school districts. The majority of the township is served by Cadillac Area Public Schools to the southeast in Cadillac, while the northeast portion of the township is served by Mesick Consolidated Schools to the northwest in Mesick.
