= Cadillac Area Public Schools =

School district in Michigan, United States

Address
- 400 Linden St. Cadillac, Wexford, Michigan, 49601; United States

District information
- Grades: Pre-Kindergarten-12
- Superintendent: Jennifer Brown
- Schools: 6
- Budget: $62,806,000 2022-2023 expenditures
- NCES District ID: 2607590

Students and staff
- Students: 3,050 (2024-2025)
- Teachers: 177.47 (on an FTE basis) (2024-2025)
- Staff: 438.66 FTE (2024-2025)
- Student–teacher ratio: 17.19 (2024-2025)

Other information
- Website: www.cadillacschools.org

Cadillac Area Public Schools is a public school district in Wexford County, Michigan. It serves Cadillac, Harrietta, and the following townships: Haring, Henderson, and South Branch. It also serves parts of the following townships: Boon, Cherry Grove, Clam Lake, Selma and Slagle. It also serves a small part of Sherman Township in Osceola County and Newkirk Township in Lake County

== History ==
By 1890, Cadillac had developed a school system with at least three ward schools and a high school. The Central School was on the block bordered by Harris, Simons, Cass, and Park Streets, and contained the high school. Outside Cadillac proper, the region was dotted with one-room schoolhouses serving township children. These smaller districts—like Highway, Little Six, Boule Creek, Fairy Lake, Elmwood—were established between the 1910s and 1920s and later phased out as students consolidated into Cadillac's schools. There were several iterations of Central School:

- 1873: Clam Lake Public School, established in early 1873 with just 35 students; a dedicated high school division was added in 1877
- 1876: A new Central School building was built.
- 1880: Central School burned down, and a new building replaced it.
- 1890: The 1880 Central School burned in 1889, and a new building replaced it. The 1890 building had a prominent central clock tower. By this time, it was known as Cadillac High School.

The 1890 high school was renovated and expanded in 1912. It became a junior high school with the opening of the present high school, and was closed in 1964.

Construction of the present high school began in 1950 and it was planned to open in fall of 1951. A ten-week delay was caused when carpenters refused to cross the picket line of the plumbers' union. Parents were in an uproar over the strike, with a political demonstration of 1,500 mothers and children and a petition requesting the Governor to intervene. The building was finished and dedicated in May 1952. The architect was St. Clair Pardee.

To open their 1952-1953 season, the high school basketball team played the Harlem Globetrotters.

In the 2020 MHSAA playoff games, the Cadillac Vikings Varsity Football made their way to Ford Field in Detroit to face the Detroit Country Day School for the Division 4 state championship. The Vikings lost 0-13, and the team was led by head coach, Cody Mallory.

== 2017 Bond ==
In 2016, Cadillac Area Public Schools under Superintendent Jennifer Brown proposed a bond that would secure funding to demolish, renovate, and modernize schools across the district. This came as a result of the growing student population and the outdated and hazardous buildings. Also to eliminate the psychological challenges on changing schools among young student, the district wanted a preschool, elementaries to house grades k-5, the middle school 6-8, and the high school 9-12. On November 7, the bond proposal passed.

The district eliminated Kenwood Elementary. The district demolished the 1970s addition, and renovated the original building into a preschool and afterschool daycare called the Viking Learning Center. Forest View Elementary underwent a heavy remodeling. Both Lincoln and Franklin Elementaries saw renovations to the existing building, but also had an addition built to incorporate more classrooms, music rooms, and cafeterias. New playgrounds, bus loops, and car lines were built to maximize productivity and safety for students, staff, and parents.

Mackinaw Trail Middle School (MTMS) was built in the early 1990s, which meant the building underwent minor renovations. Larger classrooms in the building were split in half to accommodate the merging of 3 grades in one building. Near the existing gymnasium, a secondary auxiliary gym was built, in addition to 2 floors of modern classrooms which house the 8th grade students.

Cadillac Junior High School, which previously was Cadillac Middle School before MTMS, was demolished. The building served 7th and 8th grade students, and many fundamental high school classrooms such as art, Spanish, band, and orchestra. The building contained hazardous chemicals such as asbestos.

Cadillac High School and Veterans Memorial Stadium underwent complete renovations. Cadillac High School built under 30 new classrooms where the Junior High previously stood. The cafeteria and gymnasium of the Junior High were completely remodeled to contain a large student body. The cafeteria holds around 300 people and has many food options to offer such as a Mongolian Grill, TexMex, Classic American, and a salad buffet. The Junior High gymnasium was then the schools third and final gym. The auditorium, which is widely used by the community to host events underwent many technical and physical improvements with state of the art features for the community and performing arts classes to use. Two wings of the existing 1960's building were demolished due to failing infrastructure. The other two wings remain, where science classes are held, and in the other, former classrooms were converted to house a strength and conditioning center with advance equipment for students and athletes to use. The Wexford Adolescent Wellness Center, which was in the Junior High, is now housed in between Central Administration and the High school. The Wellness Center offers free appointments to adolescents in the district. This includes but not limited to mental health, physicals, and vaccination appointments. The school created a robotics room, a wrestling practice area, an E-Sports gaming area, and new parking lots to accommodate the growing student population.

Veterans Memorial Stadium repaired cracking concrete, built a new bathhouse adjacent to the stadium, complied to ADA laws, created an area for food trucks to set up, and replaced the grass field with a turf field The turf now hosts soccer and football games, and also hosts other events such as marching band shows, and the Cadillac Memorial Day Celebration Ceremony. The tennis courts north of the school also were replaced, and bleachers were added for spectators.

Cadillac Innovation High School, formerly Cooley High School, was previously housed in the Cooley School building and annex at 213 Granite Street. The old historic Cooley School Building was no longer in a state to house students. The school then moved to a wing at the Baker College of Cadillac. There students had access to college resources, had gym classes and other physical activities at the Cadillac Dillon Community YMCA, and was across the street from the carrer technical education center through the WMISD CTC. With the bond proposal, the school then would be relocated across the street from the existing high school. A former elementary school, which in recent years housed 4 classes at the high school, was converted to house the Innovation High School. This would put all students who attend Cadillac Area Public Schools in buildings owned by the district. The students at the Innovation High School have to use cafeteria and gymnasium facilities across the street where the high school formerly was. These facilities were built in the 1990s, which meant little to no renovations in that part of the building.

Central administration, which is the office for the superintendent and other business professionals for Cadillac Area Public Schools also underwent changes. The offices were previously located in a shared building in downtown Cadillac, south of the movie theater and Cadillac Lofts Complex. The offices then moved back to the high school campus into renovated offices where the former high school main office stood. This change brought district leadership closer to staff and students, but ensured all staff for Cadillac Schools were working on school property.

The district bus garage, owned by Dean Transportation also had upgrades to current busses, but also saw the purchase of two electric school busses, the first district to do so in the area.

During this period, McKinley Elementary, a former elemantray that closed its doors in 2012, burnt to the ground. The site now sits empty and is used as a parking lot for Diggins Hill Community Park by residents.

== 1975 Kiss Homecoming ==
In the fall of 1974, the Cadillac Vikings varsity football team was struggling, with low morale and a rough losing streak. Assistant football coach Jim Neff, who was also an English teacher and fan of rock music, had an unusual idea: use the high-energy music of Kiss to inspire the team. He began incorporating Kiss's music and themes—including “Keep It Simple Stupid” (K.I.S.S.)—into pep talks and practice routines. The Vikings then went on to win seven straight games and earned a spot in the state playoffs. In 1975, with the help of Casablanca Records, a plan was made for the band to visit during homecoming week in October 1975. Kiss arrived in Cadillac on October 9 and visited Cadillac High School in full costume and makeup. They attended a pep rally, met with the football team, posed for photos, and even autographed yearbooks. On October 10, the band marched in the homecoming parade, standing atop a fire truck. That evening, Kiss was honored during the homecoming game. The rock band performed at Cadillac High School. After the game, in a moment now etched into Cadillac lore, the band departed via helicopter from the school football field in a dramatic exit.

In 2012, a movie of the event was planned, but it was delayed.

In 2015, Kiss and the Cadillac community celebrated the 40th anniversary of the visit. The city unveiled a permanent Kiss Monument at Veterans Memorial Stadium, funded in part by Kiss fans around the world. Coach Jim Neff and the band helped keep the story alive through interviews, documentaries, and appearances.

The City of Cadillac and the Cadillac Visitors Bureau have a lineup of events for the band's 50th anniversary since their appearance. Events are scheduled to take place throughout the city on October 10 and 11, 2025.

== Schools ==
Schools in Cadillac Area Public Schools district
School	Address	Notes
Cadillac High School	500 Chestnut Street, Cadillac	Grades 9-12. Built 1952.
Cadillac Innovation High School	532 Haynes St., Cadillac	Grades 9-12
Mackinaw Trail Middle School	8401 South Mackinaw Trail, Cadillac	Grades 6-8
Forest View Elementary	7840 South 25 Road, Boon	Grades K-5
Franklin Elementary	505 Lester Street, Cadillac	Grades K-5
Lincoln Elementary	125 Ayer Street, Cadillac	Grades K-5
Viking Learning Center	1700 Chestnut Street, Cadillac	Preschool and childcare

=== Former elementary schools ===
- Cooley Elementary (closed 2012)
- Kenwood Elementary (closed 2020)
- McKinley Elementary (closed 2012)
