= Cooley School =

- U.S. National Register of Historic Places
- Location within Michigan Location within the United States
- Interactive map
- Location: 221 Granite St., Cadillac, Michigan
- Coordinates: 44°14′26″N 85°23′57″W
- Area: less than 1 acre
- Built: 1924
- Built by: C. M. St. John Co.
- Architect: Judson Newell Churchill, Trend Associates
- Architectural style: Early 20th Century American, Modern
- NRHP reference No.: 100012597
- Added to NRHP: January 22, 2026

The Cooley School is a former school building located at 221 Granite Street in Cadillac, Michigan. It was listed on the National Register of Historic Places in 2026. The building is being redeveloped into apartments.

== History ==
The first school in Cadillac was organized in 1872. As the settlement grew, the size and number of school buildings also grew. In the 1880s, the school district began building elementary schools in the neighborhoods to accommodate the growing population. These were first designated by the ward number of the neighborhood; in 1885, the Fourth Ward School was constructed at this site on Granite Street. The building was soon renamed the Cooley School, after jurist Thomas M. Cooley, who served as chief justice of the Michigan Supreme Court for 20 years.

The neighborhood surrounding the Cooley School continued to grow, and the school itself was expanded at least three times due to overcrowding. However, by 1919, the school was sill too small to meet the needs of the residents, and the construction of a replacement building was discussed. Due to lack of funding, the project was delayed, but in late 1922 bonds were issued to fund a new Junior High and a replacement for the Cooley School. In 1923, the C.M. St. John Company of Saginaw was contracted to construct a new Cooley School, based on designs from architect Judson N. Churchill of Lansing, Michigan. The new school opened for students on January 14, 1924.

The school served elementary students in the neighborhood. In 1964, an annex to the school, designed by Trend Associates of Kalamazoo, Michigan, was constructed nearby. The buildings were used as a neighborhood school until declining enrollment caused it to be closed in 2010. The Cooley Alternative School was housed in the main school building until 2017, and the Annex was used for community programs. In 2023, plans were begun for rehabilitation of the school. As of 2026, Pinnicle Construction was working to transform the building into apartments.

== Description ==
The Cooley School consists of two structures. The first is the 1924 school building, which is a two-story, flat-roofed, red brick structure. The school building has 7980 square feet per floor. It is plainly constructed, and devoid of detailing that would define an architectural style. The front elevation is symmetrical and three bays wide. A concrete water table encircles the building. The center bay is pushed slightly forward, and contains an entry pavilion on the first floor and three tall, narrow window openings with limestone sills on the second floor. The flanking bays have sets of three window openings, slightly wider, on each floor. A limestone band above the second floor windows created the illusion of a parapet.

The second building, the 1964 Annex, is a single-story Modern building of 5180 square feet. It is clad in light brown brick. Below each window opening is a panel of smooth black brickwork. Canopies extend above the windows.
