= Clam Lake Township, Michigan =

- Civil township
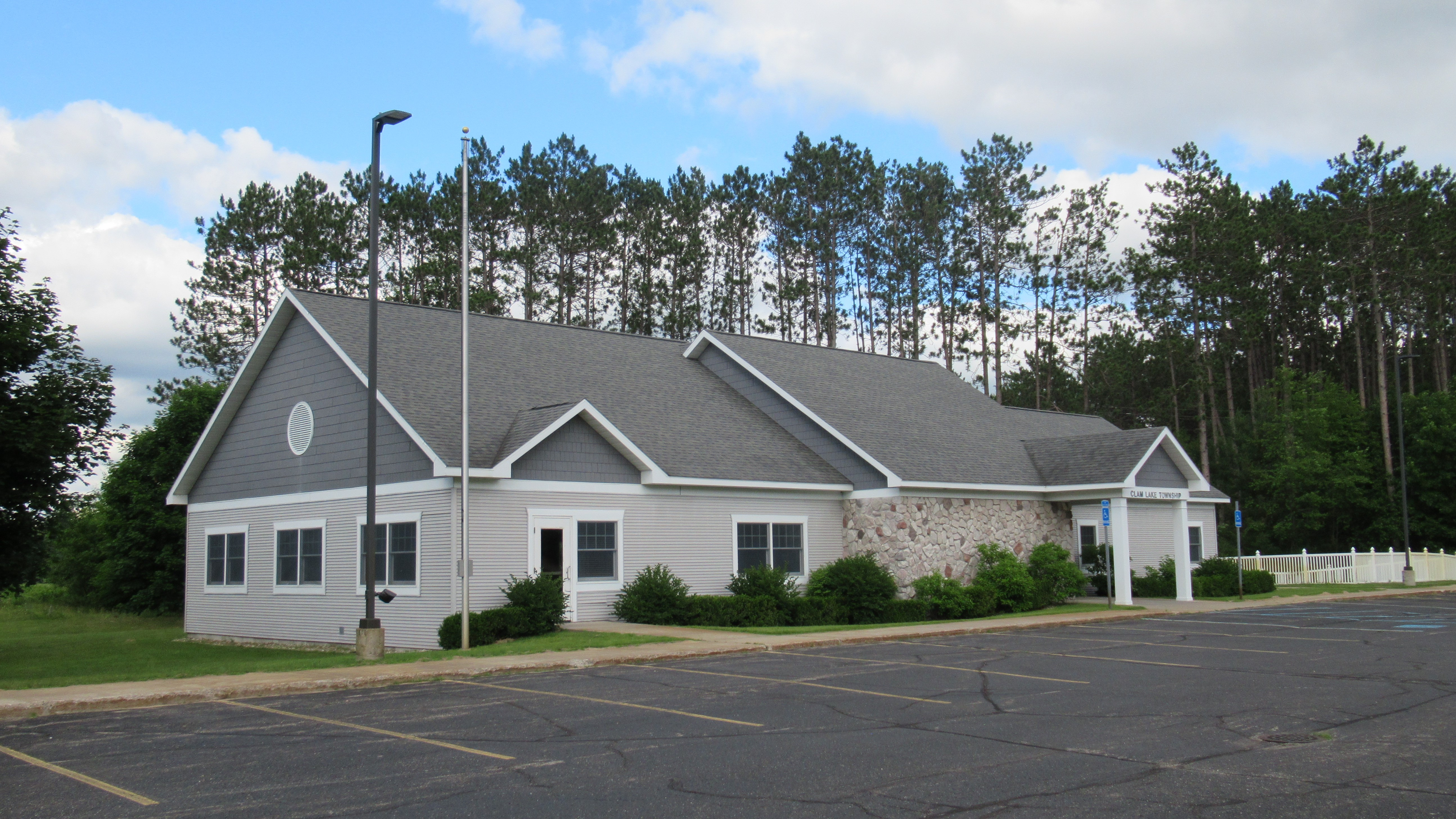
- Clam Lake Township Hall

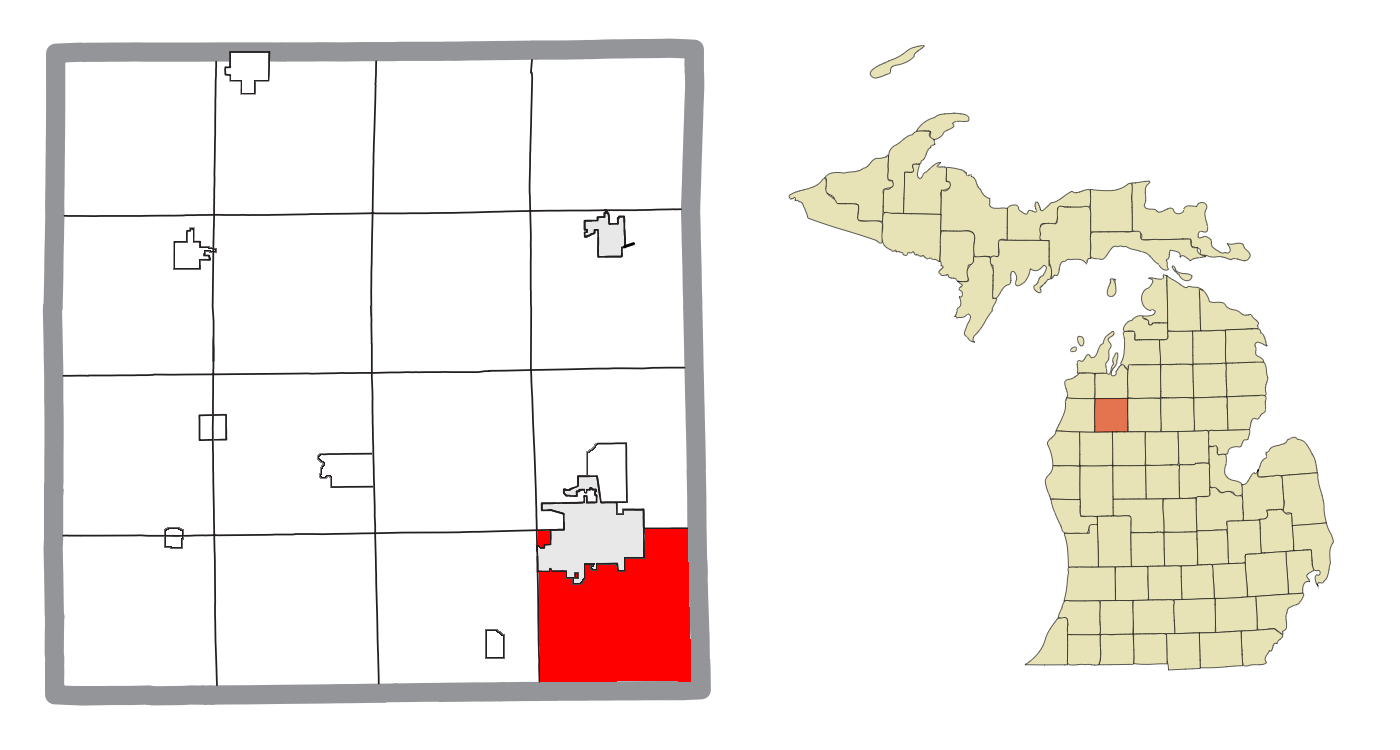
- Location within Wexford County

- Location within the state of Michigan Location within the United States
- Coordinates: 44°12′15″N 85°24′28″W
- Country: United States
- State: Michigan
- County: Wexford
- Established: 1877

Government
  - Supervisor: Steven Kitler
  - Clerk: Amy Peterson

Area
  - Total: 30.85 sq mi (79.9 km^{2})
  - Land: 30.71 sq mi (79.5 km^{2})
  - Water: 0.14 sq mi (0.36 km^{2})
- Elevation: 1,440 ft (440 m)

Population (2020)
  - Total: 2,325
  - Density: 75.71/sq mi (29.23/km^{2})
- Time zone: UTC-5 (Eastern (EST))
  - Summer (DST): UTC-4 (EDT)
- ZIP code(s): 49601 (Cadillac); 49688 (Tustin)
- Area code: 231
- FIPS code: 26-15860
- GNIS feature ID: 1626083
- Website: Official website

Clam Lake Township is a civil township of Wexford County in the U.S. state of Michigan. The population was 2,325 at the 2020 census.

== Communities ==
- Elton is a former settlement in the southeast corner of the township. It had a rural post office 8.0 miles (12.9 km) from Cadillac that operated from July 6, 1897, until September 30, 1907.
- Hobart is an unincorporated community located in the southwest portion of the township at 44°10′58″N 85°26′54″W. Hobart was founded in 1871 as a lumbering community and given a railway station on the Grand Rapids and Indiana Railroad. The community contained its own post office from July 7, 1876, until January 30, 1923.

== Geography ==
According to the U.S. Census Bureau, the township has a total area of 30.85 square miles (79.90 km^{2}), of which 30.71 square miles (79.54 km^{2}) is land and 0.14 square miles (0.36 km^{2}) (0.45%) is water.

The township lies south of the city of Cadillac.

=== Major highways ===
- US 131 runs diagonally southwest–northeast through the center of the township.
- M-55 enters at the northern border of the township and briefly runs concurrent with U.S. Route 131.
- M-115 runs diagonally southeast–northwest through the center of the township and briefly runs concurrent with U.S. Route 131 and M-55.

== Demographics ==
As of the census of 2000, there were 2,238 people, 821 households, and 637 families residing in the township. The population density was 72.5 inhabitants per square mile (28.0/km^{2}). There were 929 housing units at an average density of 30.1 per square mile (11.6/km^{2}). The racial makeup of the township was 98.88% White, 0.13% African American, 0.27% Native American, 0.09% Asian, and 0.63% from two or more races. Hispanic or Latino of any race were 0.49% of the population.

There were 821 households, out of which 35.9% had children under the age of 18 living with them, 69.3% were married couples living together, 4.8% had a female householder with no husband present, and 22.3% were non-families. 18.3% of all households were made up of individuals, and 6.6% had someone living alone who was 65 years of age or older. The average household size was 2.71 and the average family size was 3.07.

In the township the population was spread out, with 27.4% under the age of 18, 5.6% from 18 to 24, 26.5% from 25 to 44, 27.6% from 45 to 64, and 12.8% who were 65 years of age or older. The median age was 39 years. For every 100 females, there were 96.1 males. For every 100 females age 18 and over, there were 97.1 males.

The median income for a household in the township was $47,102, and the median income for a family was $53,438. Males had a median income of $34,714 versus $22,217 for females. The per capita income for the township was $21,062. About 1.3% of families and 3.8% of the population were below the poverty line, including 3.7% of those under age 18 and 5.1% of those age 65 or over.

== Education ==
Clam Lake Township is served by two separate public school districts. The vast majority of the township is served by Cadillac Area Public Schools to the north in the city of Cadillac. A smaller portion of the southwest corner of the township is served by Pine River Area Schools to the south in the village of LeRoy in Osceola County.
