= Cherry Grove Township, Michigan =

- Civil township
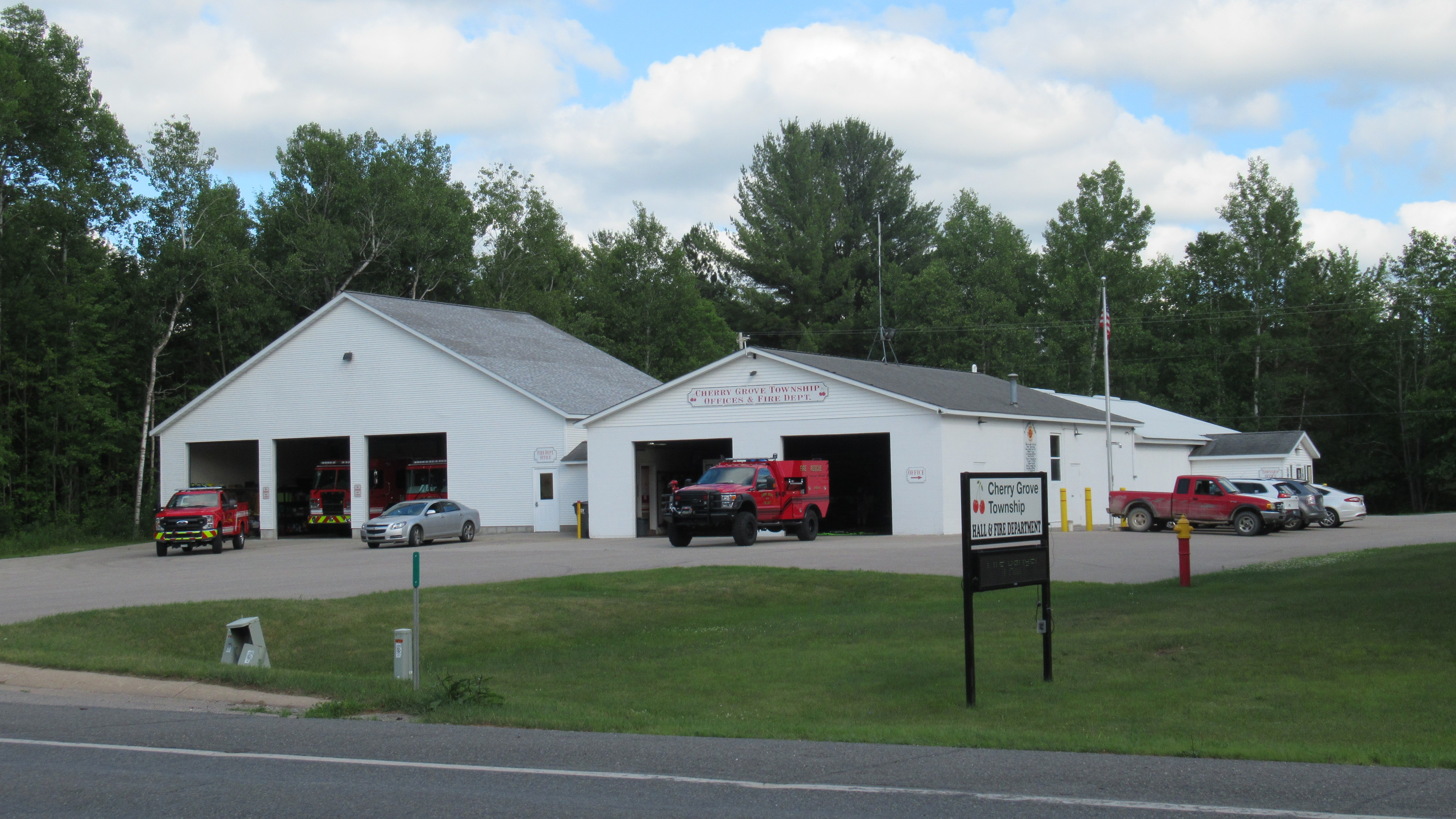
- Cherry Grove Township Hall and Fire Department

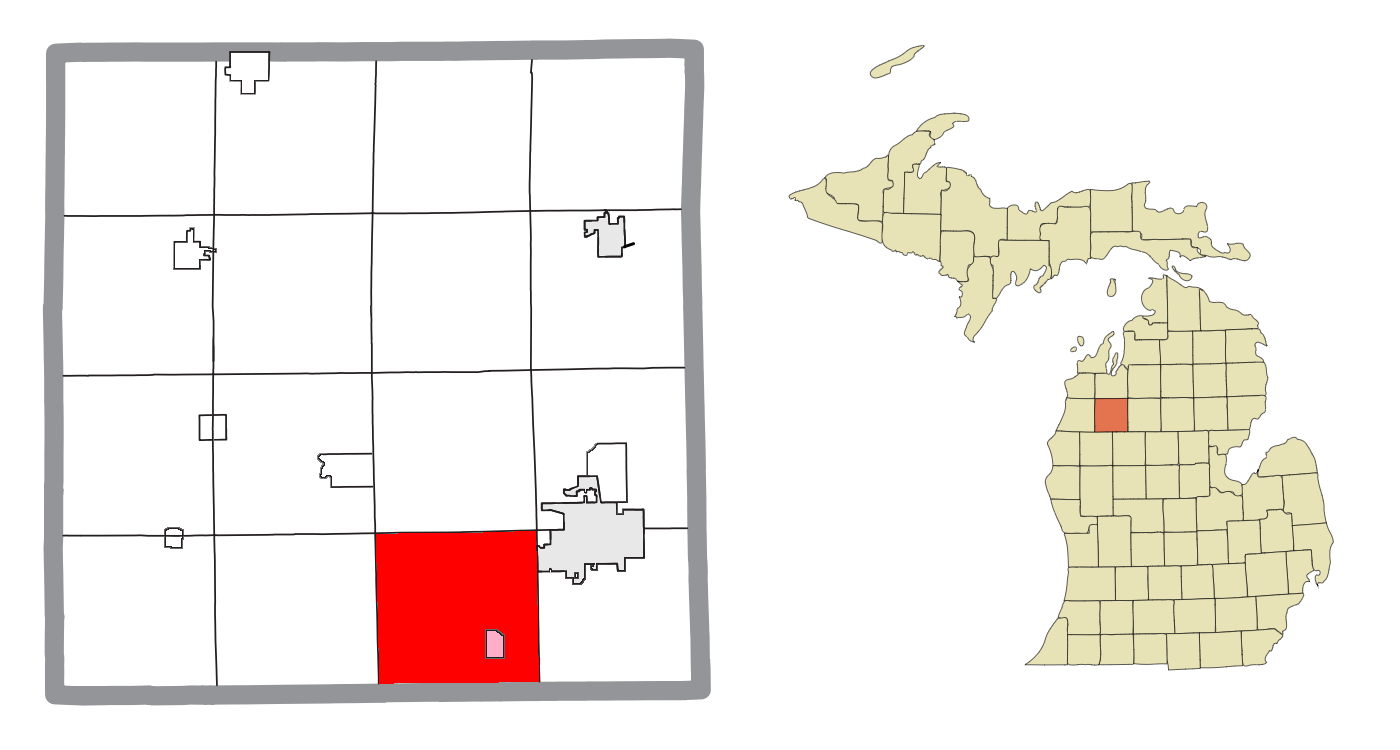
- Location within Wexford County (red) and the administered CDP of Wedgewood (pink)

- Location within the state of Michigan Location within the United States
- Coordinates: 44°11′54″N 85°30′25″W
- Country: United States
- State: Michigan
- County: Wexford

Government
  - Supervisor: Ben Pearson
  - Clerk: Lynn Nixon

Area
  - Total: 36.21 sq mi (93.78 km^{2})
  - Land: 33.37 sq mi (86.43 km^{2})
  - Water: 2.84 sq mi (7.36 km^{2})
- Elevation: 1,283 ft (391 m)

Population (2020)
  - Total: 2,421
  - Density: 72.55/sq mi (28.01/km^{2})
- Time zone: UTC-5 (Eastern (EST))
  - Summer (DST): UTC-4 (EDT)
- ZIP code(s): 49601 (Cadillac); 49618 (Boon)
- Area code: 231
- FIPS code: 26-15060
- GNIS feature ID: 1626067
- Website: Official website

Cherry Grove Township is a civil township of Wexford County in the U.S. state of Michigan. The population was 2,421 at the 2020 census.

== Communities ==
- Axin is an unincorporated community within the township at 44°12′36″N 85°32′51″W. Axin was settled about 9.5 miles (15.3 km) southwest of Cadillac and named after local resident J. Axin Morgan. A post office in Axin operated from August 21, 1899 until January 30, 1943.
- Benson is an unincorporated community within the township at 44°12′31″N 85°29′49″W. It is located about one mile south of M-55, five miles west of Cadillac. The community was named after local farmer Swan Benson and once contained its own post office from November 17, 1884 until April 30, 1911.
- Cherry Grove was one of the original communities within the township when a rural post office was established. The post office was very short lived and operated only from February 7 to March 3, 1879.
- Wedgewood is an unincorporated community and census-designated place located within the southeast portion of the township at 44°11′37″N 85°29′25″W.

== Geography ==
According to the U.S. Census Bureau, the township has a total area of 36.21 square miles (93.78 km^{2}), of which 33.37 square miles (86.43 km^{2}) is land and 2.84 square miles (7.36 km^{2}) (7.84%) is water.

Much of Lake Mitchell is located in the northeast of the township.

=== Major highways ===
- M-55 (East Michigan 55) runs east–west through the northern portion of the township.
- M-115 runs very briefly through the northeast corner of the township.

== Demographics ==
As of the census of 2000, there were 2,328 people, 908 households, and 714 families residing in the township. The population density was 69.8 inhabitants per square mile (26.9/km^{2}). There were 1,198 housing units at an average density of 35.9 per square mile (13.9/km^{2}). The racial makeup of the township was 97.98% White, 0.09% African American, 0.39% Native American, 0.60% Asian, and 0.95% from two or more races. Hispanic or Latino of any race were 0.69% of the population.

There were 908 households, out of which 32.4% had children under the age of 18 living with them, 70.9% were married couples living together, 4.7% had a female householder with no husband present, and 21.3% were non-families. 18.3% of all households were made up of individuals, and 5.4% had someone living alone who was 65 years of age or older. The average household size was 2.56 and the average family size was 2.89.

In the township the population was spread out, with 24.7% under the age of 18, 5.1% from 18 to 24, 26.6% from 25 to 44, 30.5% from 45 to 64, and 13.0% who were 65 years of age or older. The median age was 42 years. For every 100 females, there were 98.3 males. For every 100 females age 18 and over, there were 100.0 males.

The median income for a household in the township was $51,190, and the median income for a family was $55,444. Males had a median income of $39,688 versus $25,781 for females. The per capita income for the township was $22,798. About 5.3% of families and 5.9% of the population were below the poverty line, including 4.0% of those under age 18 and 1.8% of those age 65 or over.

== Education ==
Cherry Grove Township is served by two separate public school districts. The vast majority of the township is served by Cadillac Area Public Schools to the east in the city of Cadillac. A very small portion of the southeast corner of the township is served by Pine River Area Schools to the south in the village of LeRoy in Osceola County.
