= Old Cadillac City Hall =

- U.S. National Register of Historic Places
- Michigan State Historic Site
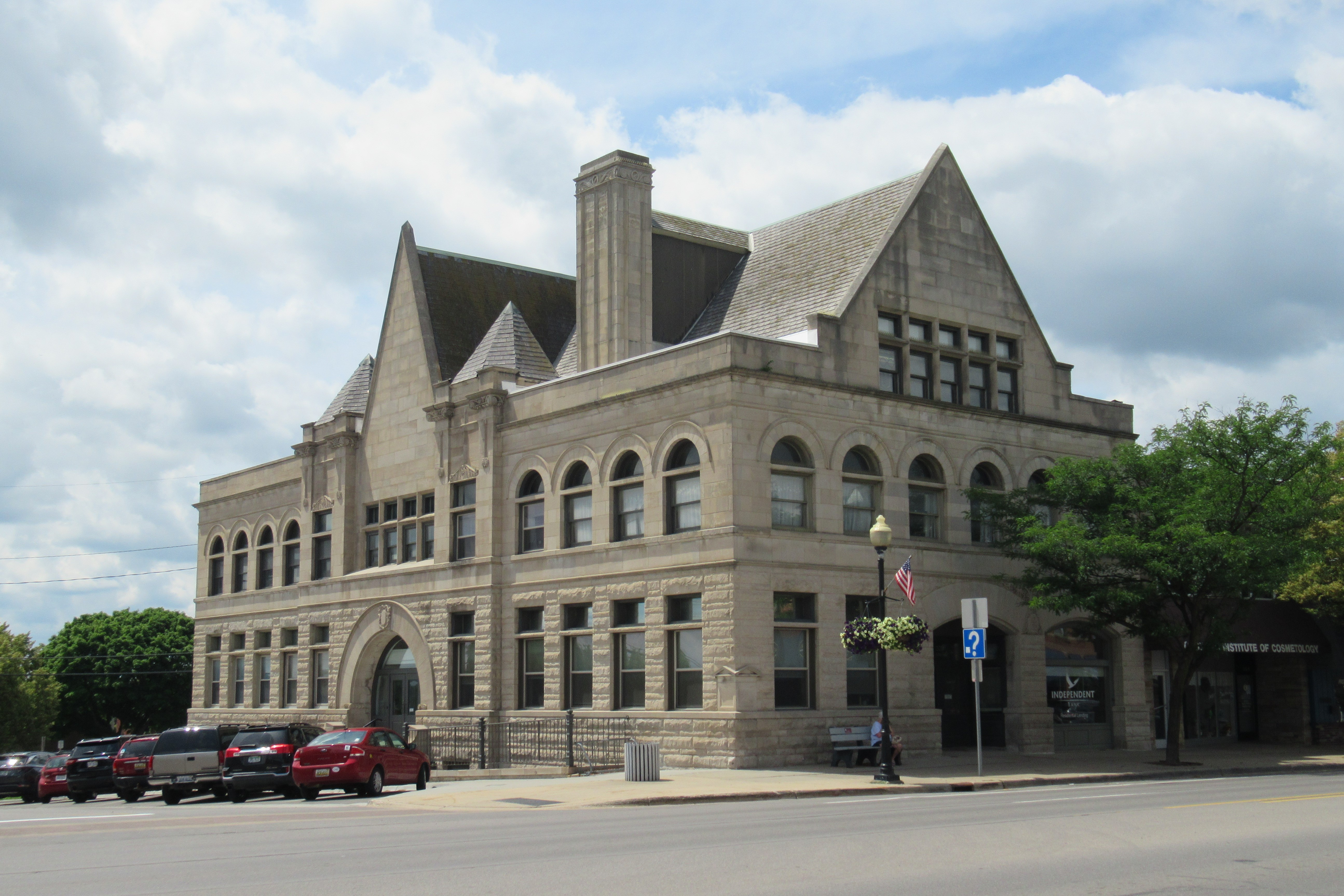

- Location within Michigan Location within the United States
- Interactive map
- Location: 201 Mitchell St., Cadillac, Michigan
- Coordinates: 44°14′56″N 85°24′0″W
- Area: 1.4 acres (0.57 ha)
- Built: 1900
- Built by: A.W. Muhnek, J. R. Fletcher
- Architect: William W. Williamson
- Architectural style: Romanesque, Richardsonian Romanesque
- NRHP reference No.: 86001380

Significant dates
- Added to NRHP: June 26, 1986
- Designated MSHS: June 23, 1983

The Old Cadillac City Hall is a government building located at 201 Mitchell Street in Cadillac, Michigan. It was designated a Michigan State Historic Site in 1983 and listed on the National Register of Historic Places in 1986.

== History ==
In 1899, the citizens of Cadillac voted to construct a new City Hall. Architect William W. Williamson designed the building, and A.W. Muhnek of Grand Rapids, Michigan began construction in 1900. However, the builder failed, without an adequate bond, and in early 1901 builder J. R. Fletcher had to be brought in to finish the project. The structure was used by the city of Cadillac until 1977, when a new Cadillac City Hall was constructed. The building was vacant for seven years, and was later renovated for commercial and office use.

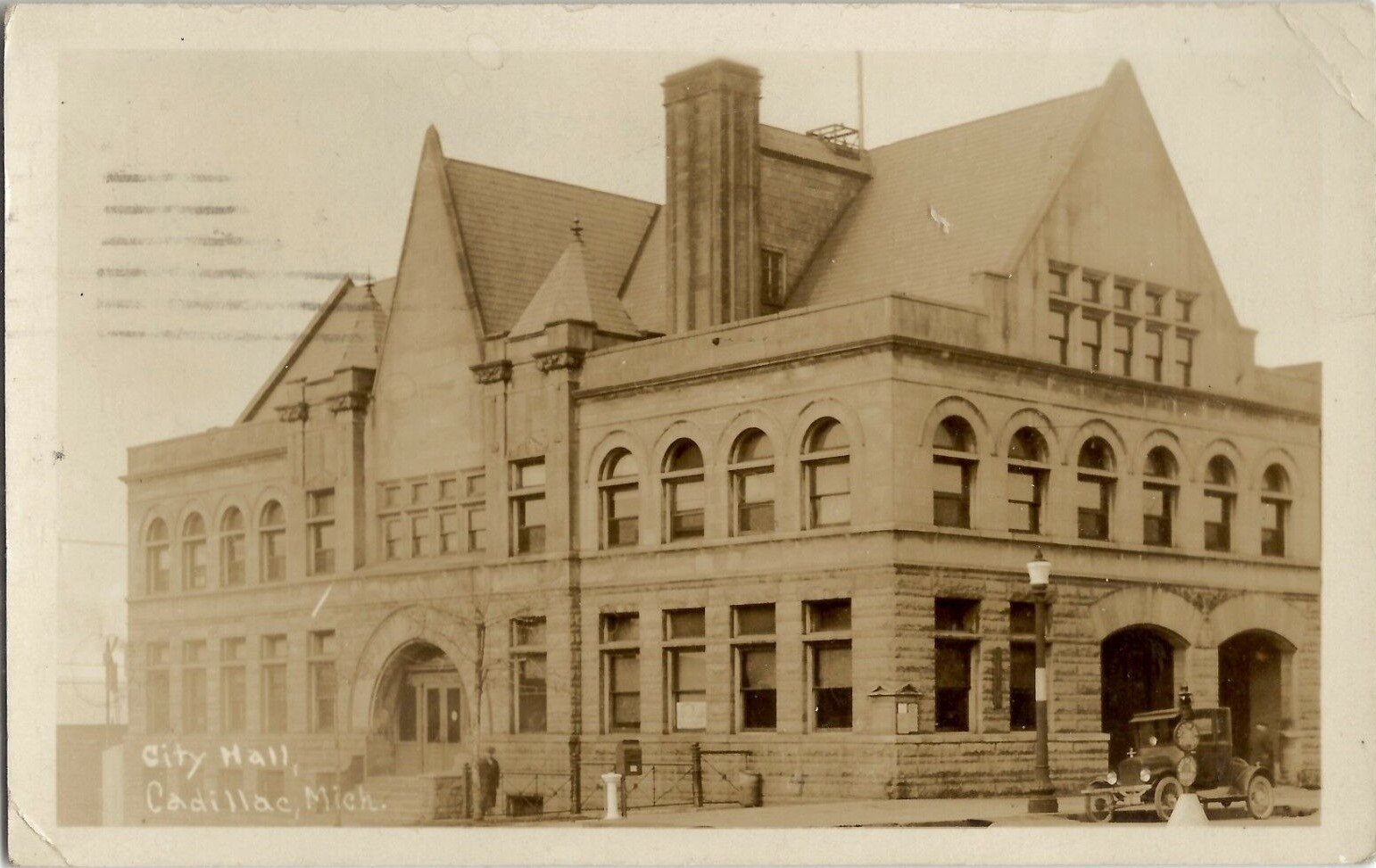
The city hall of Cadillac, Michigan was shown on a postcard mailed in May 1924.

== Description ==
The Old Cadillac City Hall is a three-story building constructed of brick with stone facing with a steeply pitched slate roof. The building has Richardsonian Romanesque detailing, including the arched doors and windows. The first floor contains rectangular windows in rectangular opening, the second floor contains round-headed window openings, and the third floor has steeply sloped stone gables. Stone steps approach the monumental, centrally located arched main entrance broad, set into a slightly projecting, entrance pavilion. The pavilion is topped with a peaked gable roof. The east side contains arched stone openings defining the entrances to the original fire station.

The interior of the building has an ornamental staircase connecting the floors. The lower level has a vaulted brick ceiling underneath the fire truck area above.
