= Haring Township, Michigan =

Township in Wexford County, Michigan

- Charter township
- Charter Township of Haring
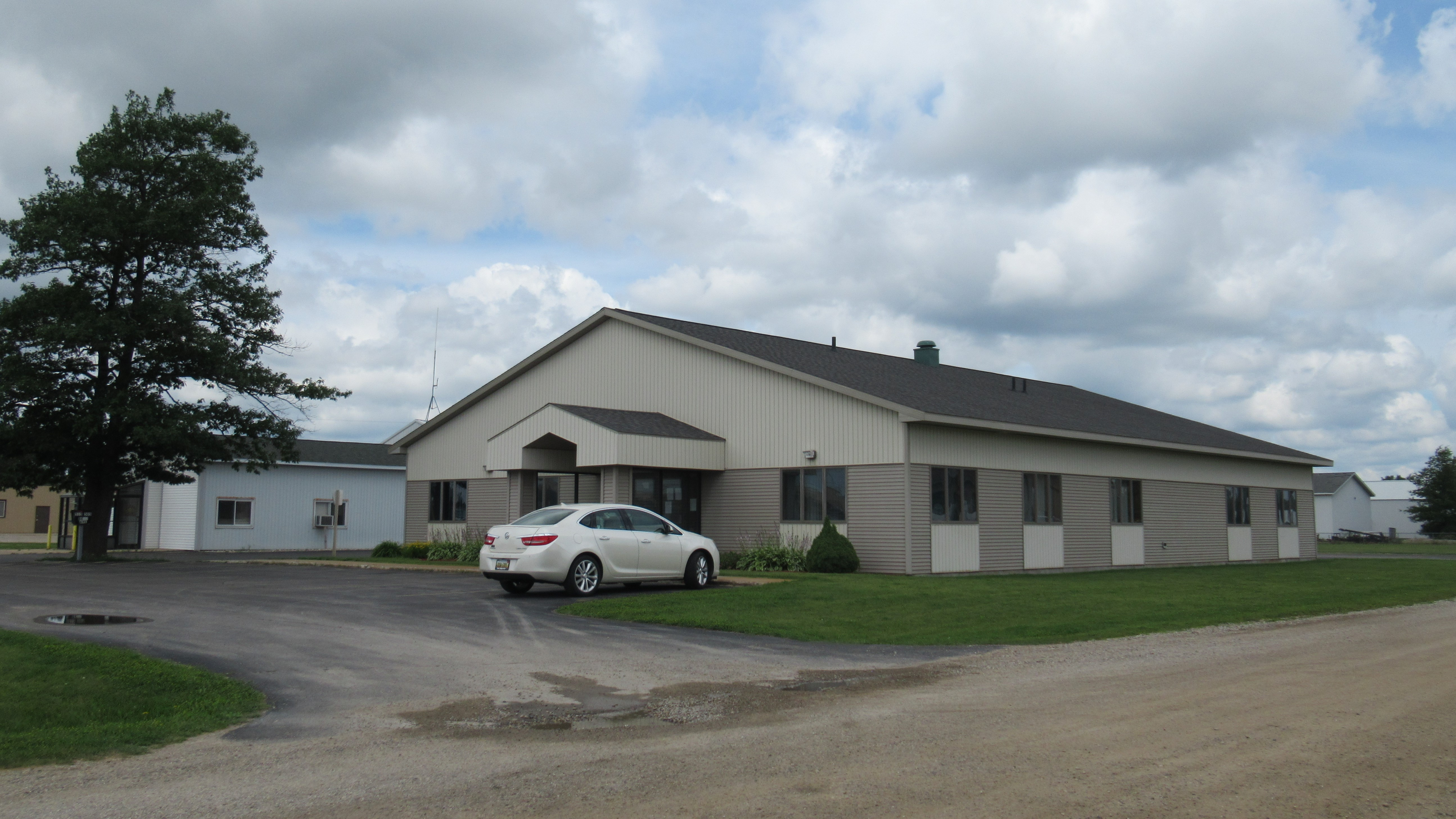
- Haring Charter Township Hall in Haring

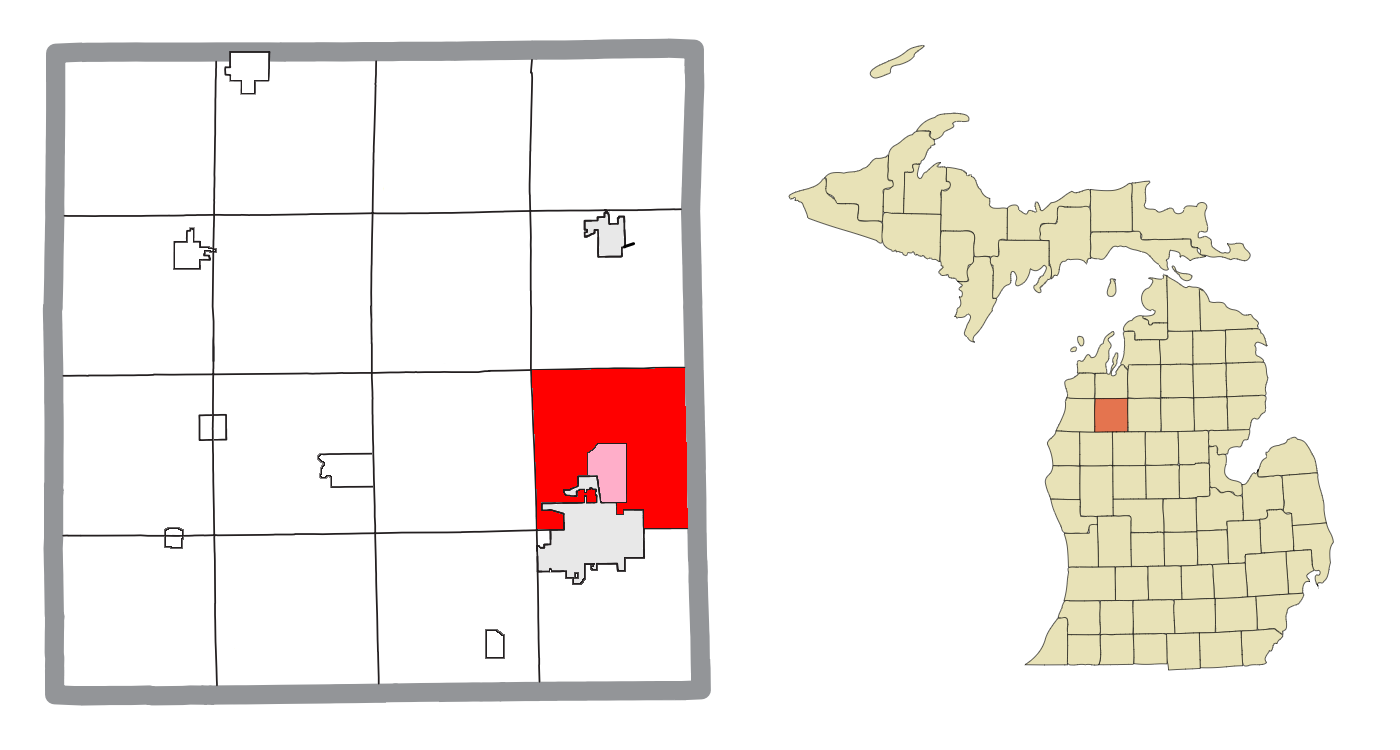
- Location within Wexford County (red) and the administered CDP of Haring (pink)

- Location within the state of Michigan Location within the United States
- Coordinates: 44°17′56″N 85°23′43″W
- Country: United States
- State: Michigan
- County: Wexford

Government
  - Supervisor: Robert Scarbrough
  - Clerk: Paula Dewey

Area
  - Total: 32.78 sq mi (84.90 km^{2})
  - Land: 32.36 sq mi (83.81 km^{2})
  - Water: 0.42 sq mi (1.09 km^{2})
- Elevation: 1,322 ft (403 m)

Population (2020)
  - Total: 3,556
  - Density: 109.9/sq mi (42.43/km^{2})
- Time zone: UTC-5 (Eastern (EST))
  - Summer (DST): UTC-4 (EDT)
- ZIP code(s): 49601 (Cadillac)
- Area code: 231
- GNIS feature ID: 1626435
- Website: Official website

Haring Township is a charter township of Wexford County in the U.S. state of Michigan. The population was 3,556 at the 2020 census, making it the most populous township in Wexford County. The township has a boundary with the city of Cadillac, to the south.

== Communities ==
- Bond's Mill is a former settlement that began in 1872 when William Mitchell and Johnathon Cobbs opened sawmills along the shores of Clam Lake (now Lake Cadillac). A post office named Bond's Mill opened on October 30, 1872, and was named after the first postmaster Myron Bond. The post office operated until November 30, 1883.
- Haring is an unincorporated community and census-designated place located within the township at 44°17′55″N 85°24′47″W just north of the city of Cadillac.
- Missaukee Junction is an unincorporated community within the township at 44°18′32″N 85°24′52″W. Settled about 4.0 miles (6.4 km) north of the city of the Cadillac, it began as a station on the Grand Rapids and Indiana Railroad around 1876. It was named after an Ottawa chief named Nesaukee.
- Round Lake is a former lumber settlement located within the township along the lake of the same name. The Round Lake post office operated from May 26, 1873, until December 28, 1887.

== Geography ==
According to the U.S. Census Bureau, the township has total area of 32.78 square miles (84.90 km^{2}), of which 32.36 square miles (83.81 km^{2}) is land and 0.42 square miles (1.09 km^{2}) (1.28%) is water.

The Clam River flows through the southeast of Haring Township.

=== Major highways ===
- US 131 runs south–north through the center of the township.
- Bus. US 131 is a business route that runs through Cadillac and north into Haring Township, where it rejoins with US 131.
- M-55 forms the southernmost border of the township before M-55 turns south to run concurrent with US 131.

== Demographics ==
As of the census of 2000, there were 2,962 people, 1,073 households, and 843 families residing in the township. The population density was 91.1 inhabitants per square mile (35.2/km^{2}). There were 1,149 housing units at an average density of 35.3 units per square mile (13.6 units/km^{2}). The racial makeup of the township was 98.08% White, 0.37% African American, 0.57% Native American, 0.34% Asian, 0.14% from other races, and 0.51% from two or more races. Hispanic or Latino of any race were 0.54% of the population.

There were 1,073 households, out of which 36.1% had children under the age of 18 living with them, 63.0% were married couples living together, 11.5% had a female householder with no husband present, and 21.4% were non-families. 17.4% of all households were made up of individuals, and 7.1% had someone living alone who was 65 years of age or older. The average household size was 2.69 and the average family size was 2.98.

In the township the population was spread out, with 26.1% under the age of 18, 6.3% from 18 to 24, 28.4% from 25 to 44, 26.1% from 45 to 64, and 13.1% who were 65 years of age or older. The median age was 38 years. For every 100 females, there were 98.7 males. For every 100 females age 18 and over, there were 92.9 males.

The median income for a household in the township was $40,265, and the median income for a family was $43,468. Males had a median income of $33,042 versus $22,250 for females. The per capita income for the township was $17,001. About 5.9% of families and 7.2% of the population were below the poverty line, including 8.2% of those under age 18 and 6.7% of those age 65 or over.

== Education ==
Haring Charter Township is served entirely by Cadillac Area Public Schools to the south in the city of Cadillac.
