= Henderson Township, Michigan =

- Civil township
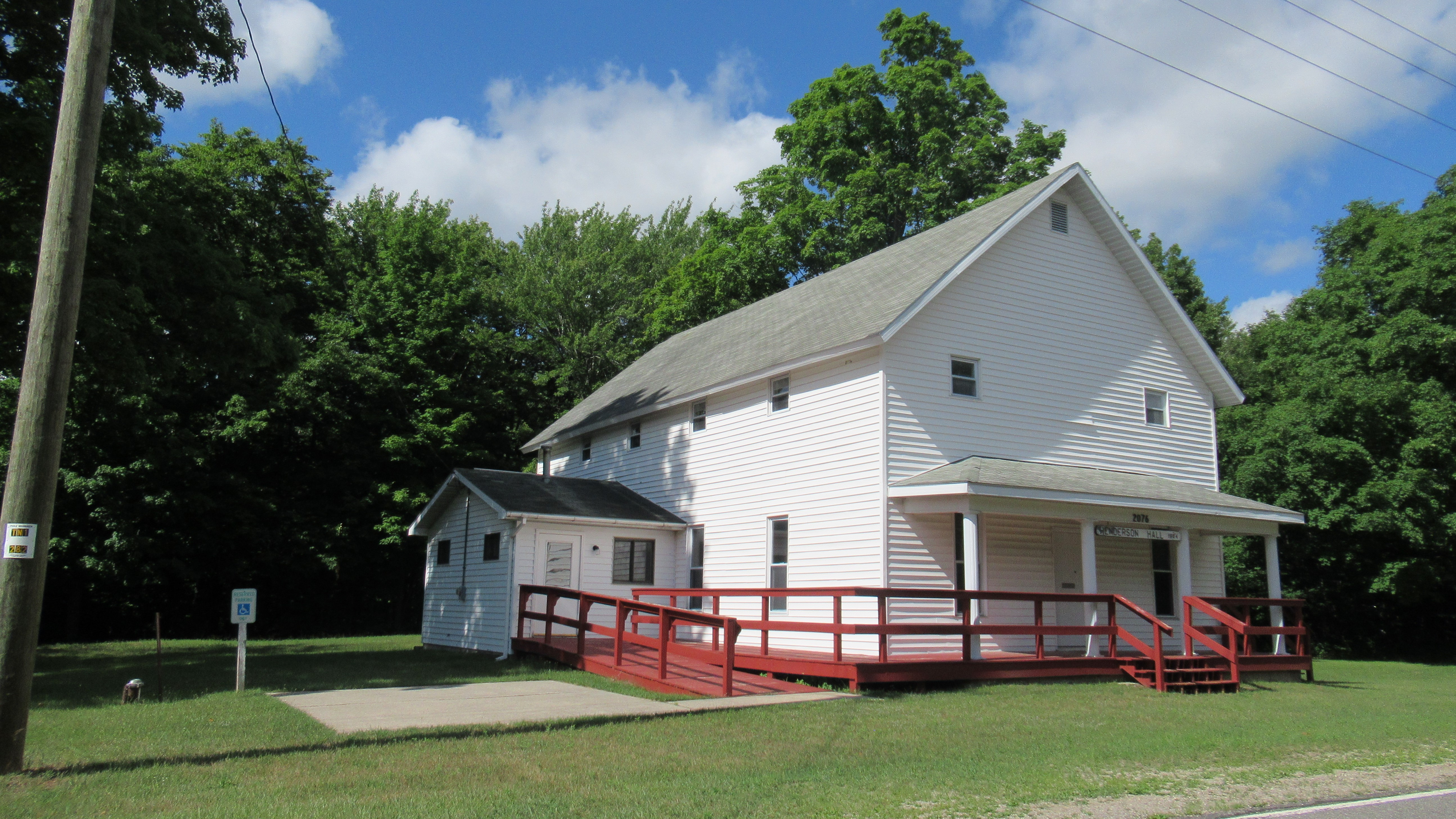
- Henderson Township Hall

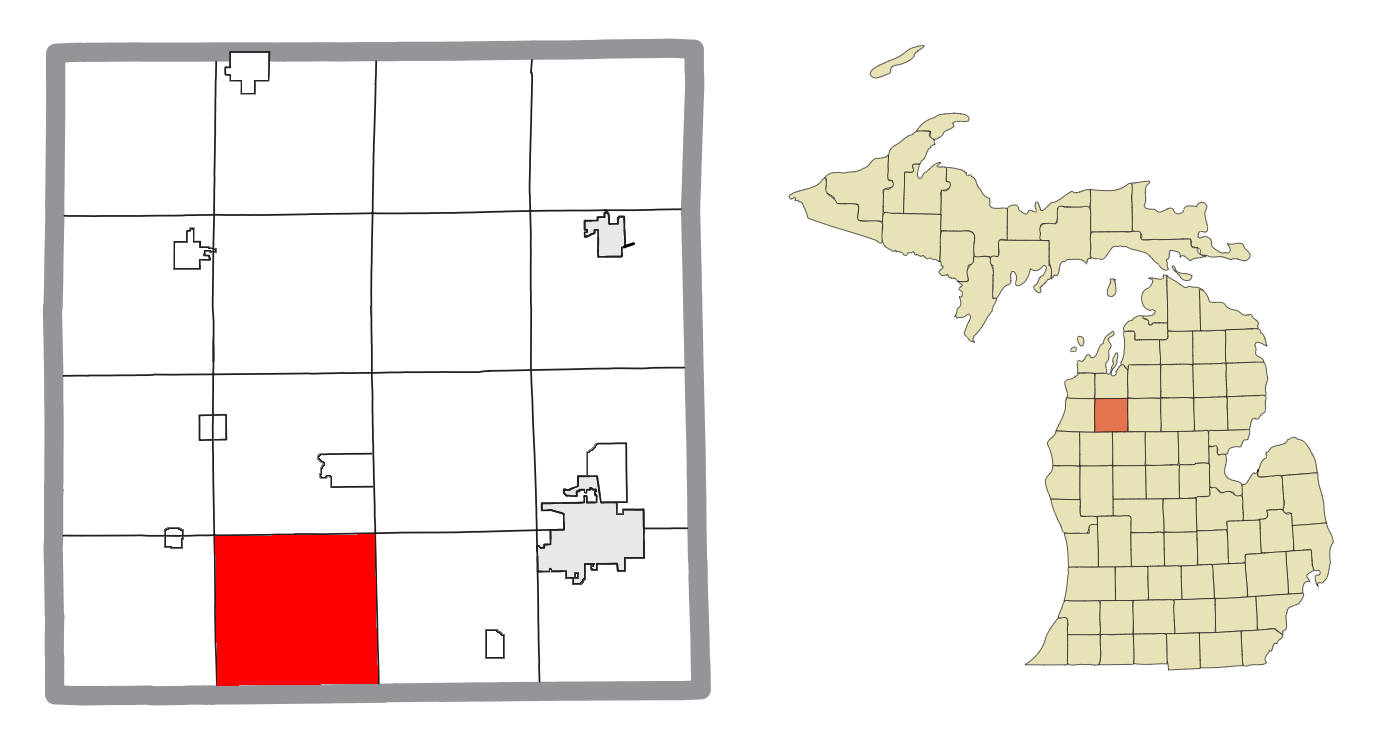
- Location within Wexford County

- Location within the state of Michigan Location within the United States
- Coordinates: 44°12′18″N 85°39′18″W
- Country: United States
- State: Michigan
- County: Wexford
- Established: 1904

Government
  - Supervisor: Gerald Sours
  - Clerk: Doreen Wayrynen

Area
  - Total: 36.22 sq mi (93.81 km^{2})
  - Land: 36.21 sq mi (93.78 km^{2})
  - Water: 0.012 sq mi (0.03 km^{2})
- Elevation: 1,358 ft (414 m)

Population (2020)
  - Total: 183
  - Density: 5.05/sq mi (1.95/km^{2})
- Time zone: UTC-5 (Eastern (EST))
  - Summer (DST): UTC-4 (EDT)
- ZIP code(s): 49601 (Cadillac); 49618 (Boon); 49638 (Harrietta)
- Area code: 231
- FIPS code: 26-37640
- GNIS feature ID: 1626463
- Website: https://hendersontwpmi.gov/

Henderson Township is a civil township of Wexford County in the U.S. state of Michigan. The population was 183 at the 2020 census.

== Communities ==
- Angola is a former settlement within the township. It had a rural post office from December 20, 1899, until February 9, 1909. The community appeared on a 1914 map of Henderson Township.

== Geography ==
According to the U.S. Census Bureau, the township has a total area of 36.22 square miles (93.81 km^{2}), of which 36.21 square miles (93.78 km^{2}) is land and 0.01 square miles (0.03 km^{2}) (0.03%) is water.

=== Major highways ===
- M-55 runs east–west through the center of the township.

== Demographics ==
As of the census of 2000, there were 176 people, 73 households, and 57 families residing in the township. The population density was 4.9 inhabitants per square mile (1.9/km^{2}). There were 111 housing units at an average density of 3.1 units per square mile (1.2 units/km^{2}). The racial makeup of the township was 98.86% White, and 1.14% from two or more races. Hispanic or Latino of any race were 1.70% of the population.

There were 73 households, out of which 23.3% had children under the age of 18 living with them, 75.3% were married couples living together, 1.4% had a female householder with no husband present, and 21.9% were non-families. 19.2% of all households were made up of individuals, and 6.8% had someone living alone who was 65 years of age or older. The average household size was 2.41 and the average family size was 2.74.

In the township the population was spread out, with 16.5% under the age of 18, 8.0% from 18 to 24, 22.2% from 25 to 44, 35.2% from 45 to 64, and 18.2% who were 65 years of age or older. The median age was 46 years. For every 100 females, there were 109.5 males. For every 100 females age 18 and over, there were 107.0 males.

The median income for a household in the township was $32,000, and the median income for a family was $42,250. Males had a median income of $30,000 versus $17,500 for females. The per capita income for the township was $18,877. About 4.1% of families and 6.2% of the population were below the poverty line, including 13.0% of those under the age of eighteen and none of those 65 or over.

== Education ==
Henderson Township is served entirely by Cadillac Area Public Schools to the east in Cadillac.
