= Charles T. Mitchell House =

Historic house in Michigan, United States

- U.S. National Register of Historic Places
- Michigan State Historic Site
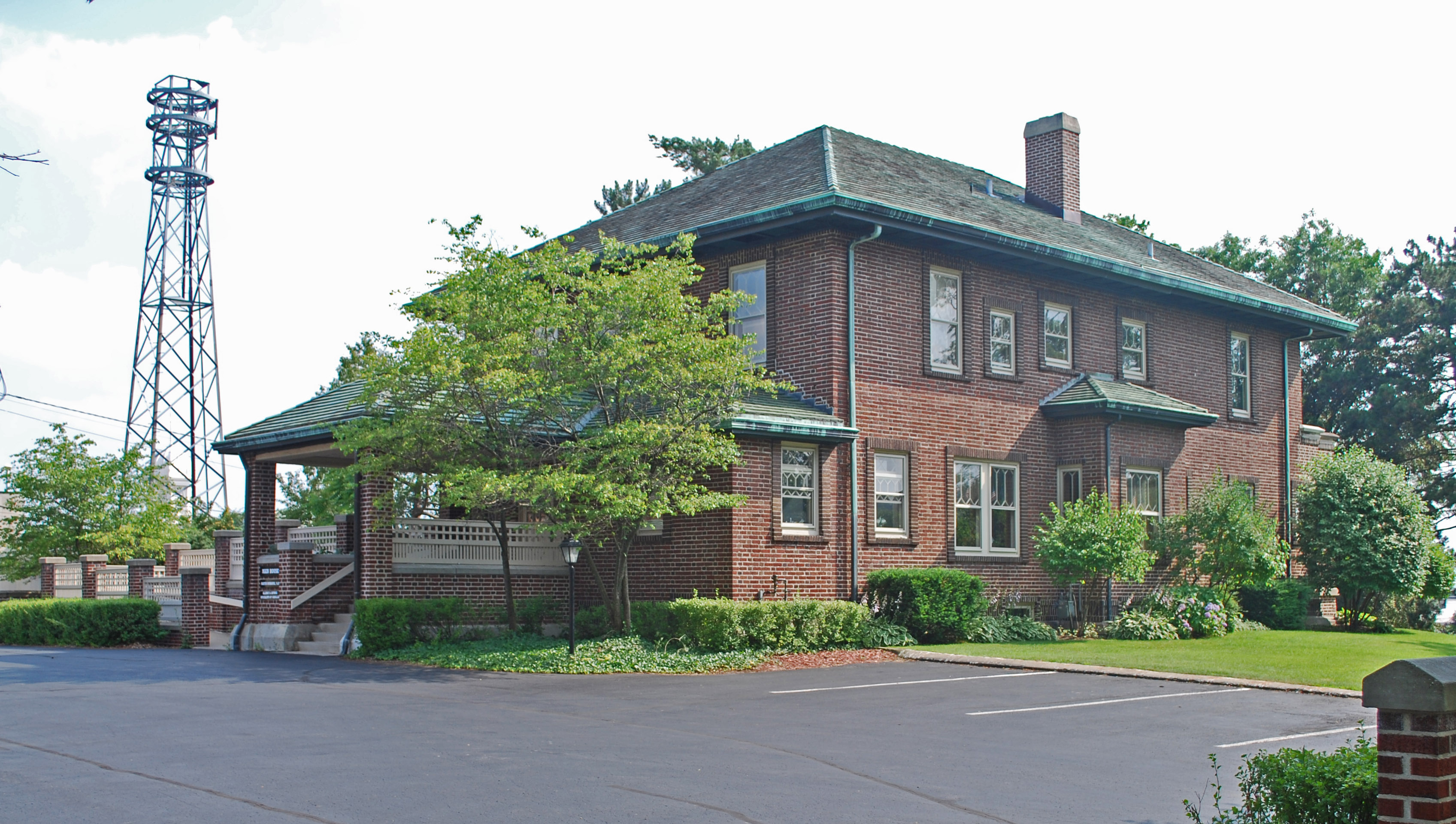

- Location within Michigan Location within the United States
- Interactive map
- Location: 118 N. Shelby St., Cadillac, Michigan
- Coordinates: 44°15′6″N 85°23′53″W
- Area: 1 acre (0.40 ha)
- Built: 1926
- Architectural style: Prairie School, Bungalow/craftsman
- NRHP reference No.: 86003369

Significant dates
- Added to NRHP: December 1, 1986
- Designated MSHS: July 23, 1987

The Charles T. Mitchell House is a private house located at 118 North Shelby Street in Cadillac, Michigan, USA. It was designated a Michigan State Historic Site in 1987 and listed on the National Register of Historic Places in 1986.

== History ==
George A. Mitchell, a brother to Congressman William Mitchell of Indiana, arrived in the Cadillac area in 1869, exploring the proposed route of the Grand Rapids and Indiana Railroad. He was particularly interested in the area near Clam Lake (now Lake Cadillac). In 1871, he returned to the area and platted a village on the shore of the lake, and by January 1872 the village already had 300 inhabitants. Mitchell was able to induce many influential businessmen and lumbermen to settle in his new community, including his nephew William W. Mitchell.

In 1874, George Mitchell built this house in the Second Empire style, including ornate carved woodwork inside and a mansard roof outside. He lived here until 1878, when his business partner, Wellington W. Cummer, purchased it. Cummer lived in the house until 1922.

George Mitchell's nephew William Mitchell went on to form, with partner Jonathan W. Cobbs, the firm of Cobbs & Mitchell, which was among the largest lumbering firms in Michigan; he also formed Mitchell Brothers. In 1876, William Mitchell married Ella Yost; the couple had two children, Charles T. Mitchell and Marie Mitchell. As the 20th century dawned, Charles T. Mitchell began looking after William Mitchell's affairs, and when William died in 1915, Charles was able to step in as president of the companies formerly headed by his father.

In 1922, Charles T. Mitchell purchased the house built by his uncle George from Wellington W. Cummer. In 1926, Mitchell completely renovated the house to reflect the then-current Prairie School trend in architecture. The house was clad with red brick, most of the ornamentation was removed, and the mansard roof was replaced with a low hip roof.

== Gallery ==
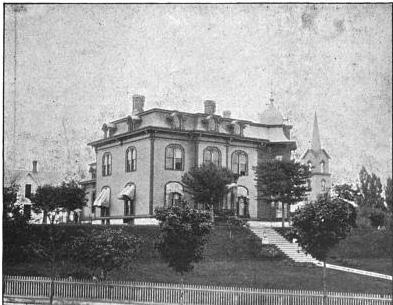
House as originally built

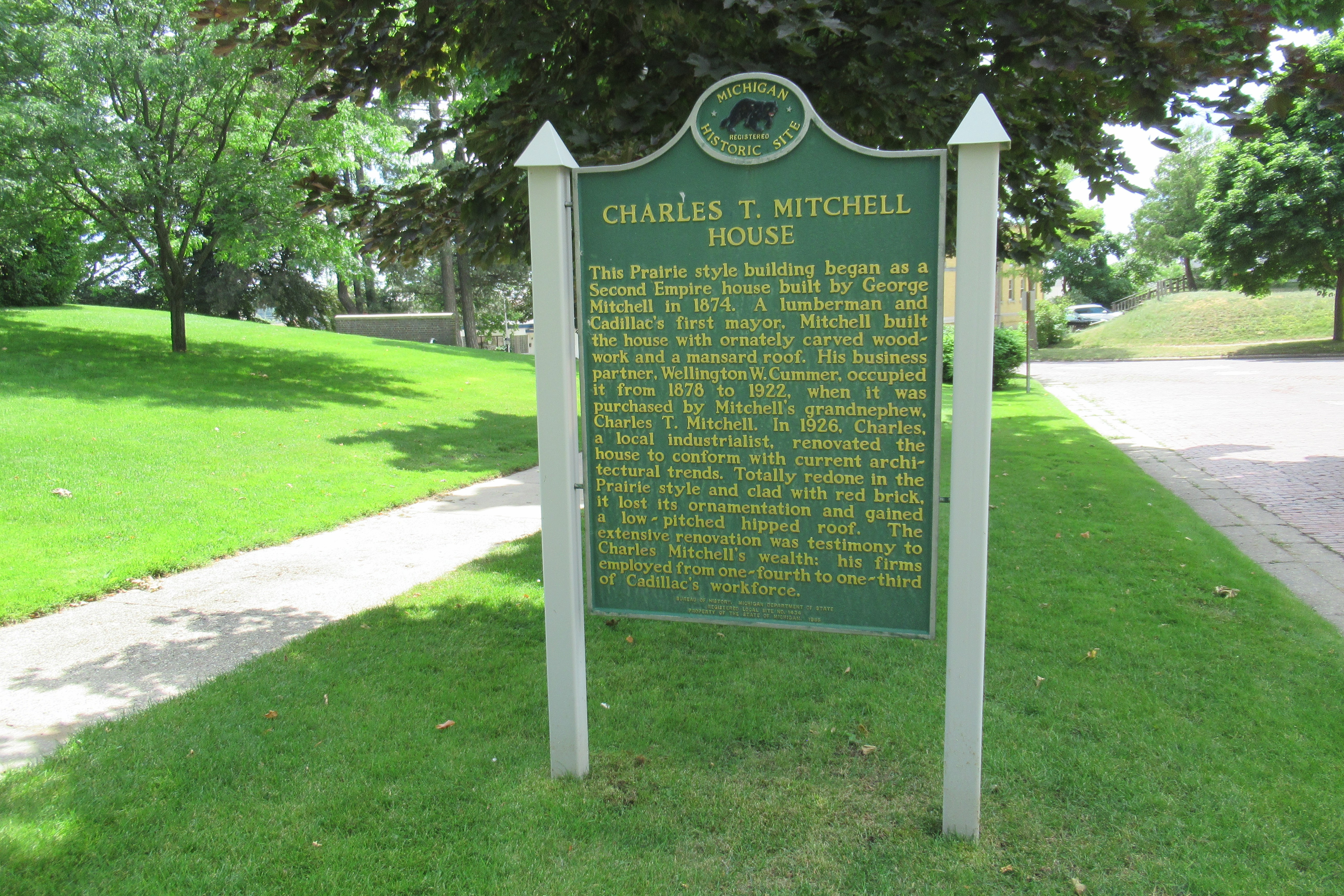
Michigan state historic marker

== Description ==
The Charles T. Mitchell House is a two-story rectangular house clad in rust-colored brick with a slate hip roof. A single story, L-shaped carriage house is constructed similarly.
