= Colfax Township, Wexford County, Michigan =

Colfax Township, Michigan
- Civil township
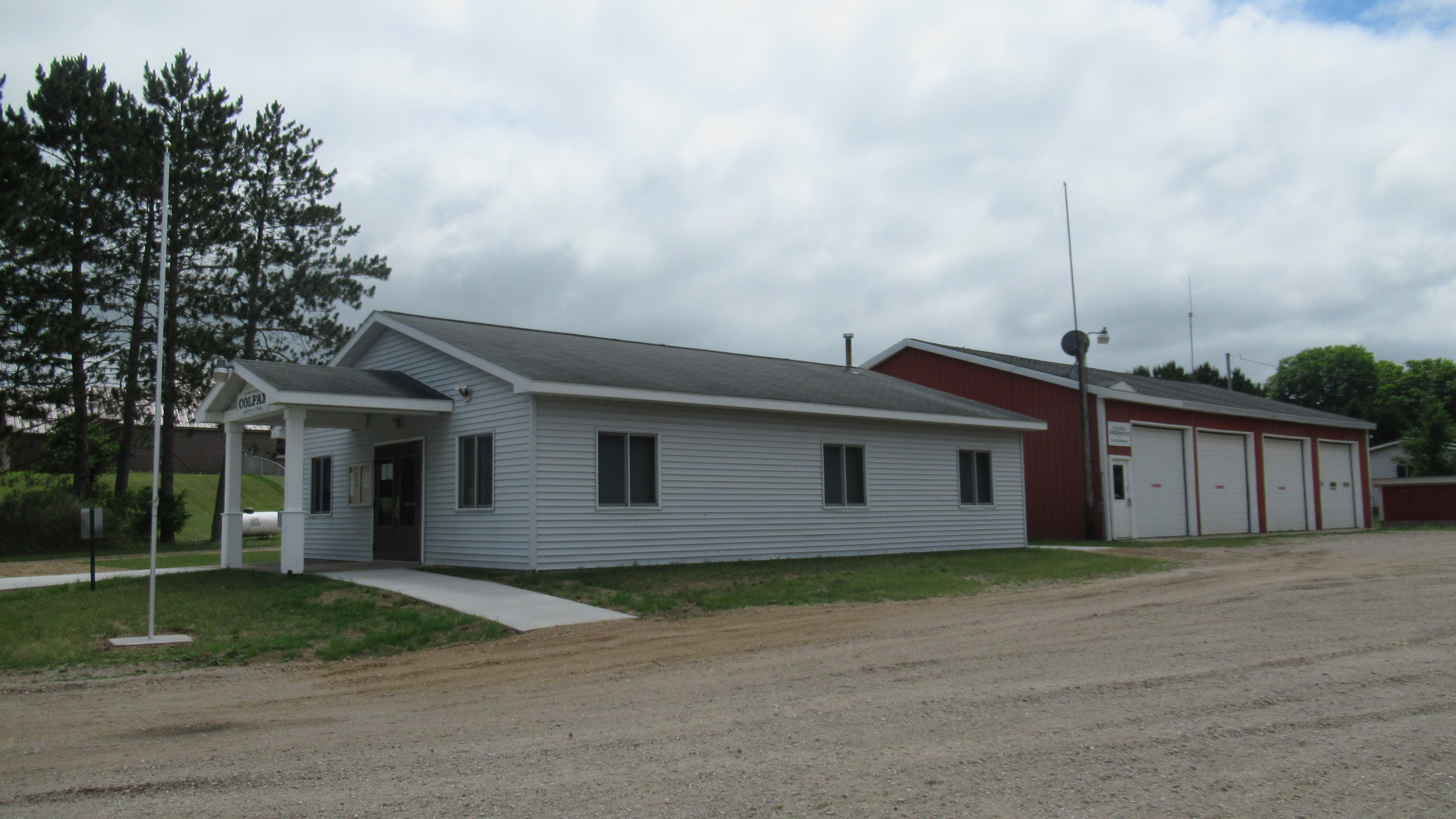
- Colfax Township Hall and Fire Department

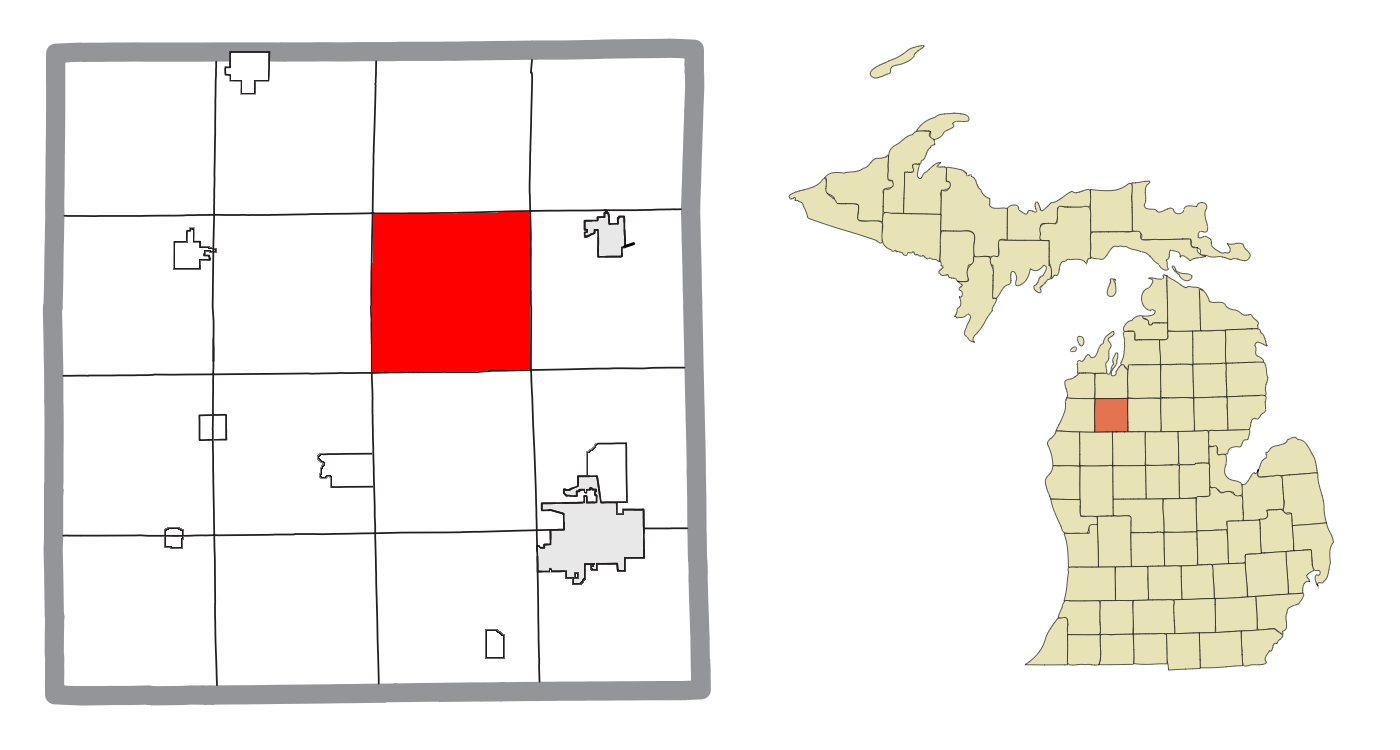
- Location within Wexford County

- Location within the state of Michigan Location within the United States
- Coordinates: 44°22′32″N 85°31′12″W
- Country: United States
- State: Michigan
- County: Wexford
- Established: 1869

Government
  - Supervisor: Michael Mix
  - Clerk: Rebecca Stoddard

Area
  - Total: 35.40 sq mi (91.69 km^{2})
  - Land: 35.26 sq mi (91.32 km^{2})
  - Water: 0.14 sq mi (0.36 km^{2})
- Elevation: 1,253 ft (382 m)

Population (2020)
  - Total: 897
  - Density: 25.4/sq mi (9.82/km^{2})
- Time zone: UTC-5 (Eastern (EST))
  - Summer (DST): UTC-4 (EDT)
- ZIP code(s): 49601 (Cadillac); 49618 (Boon); 49663 (Manton); 49668 (Mesick)
- Area code: 231
- FIPS code: 26-17200
- GNIS feature ID: 1626115
- Website: Official website

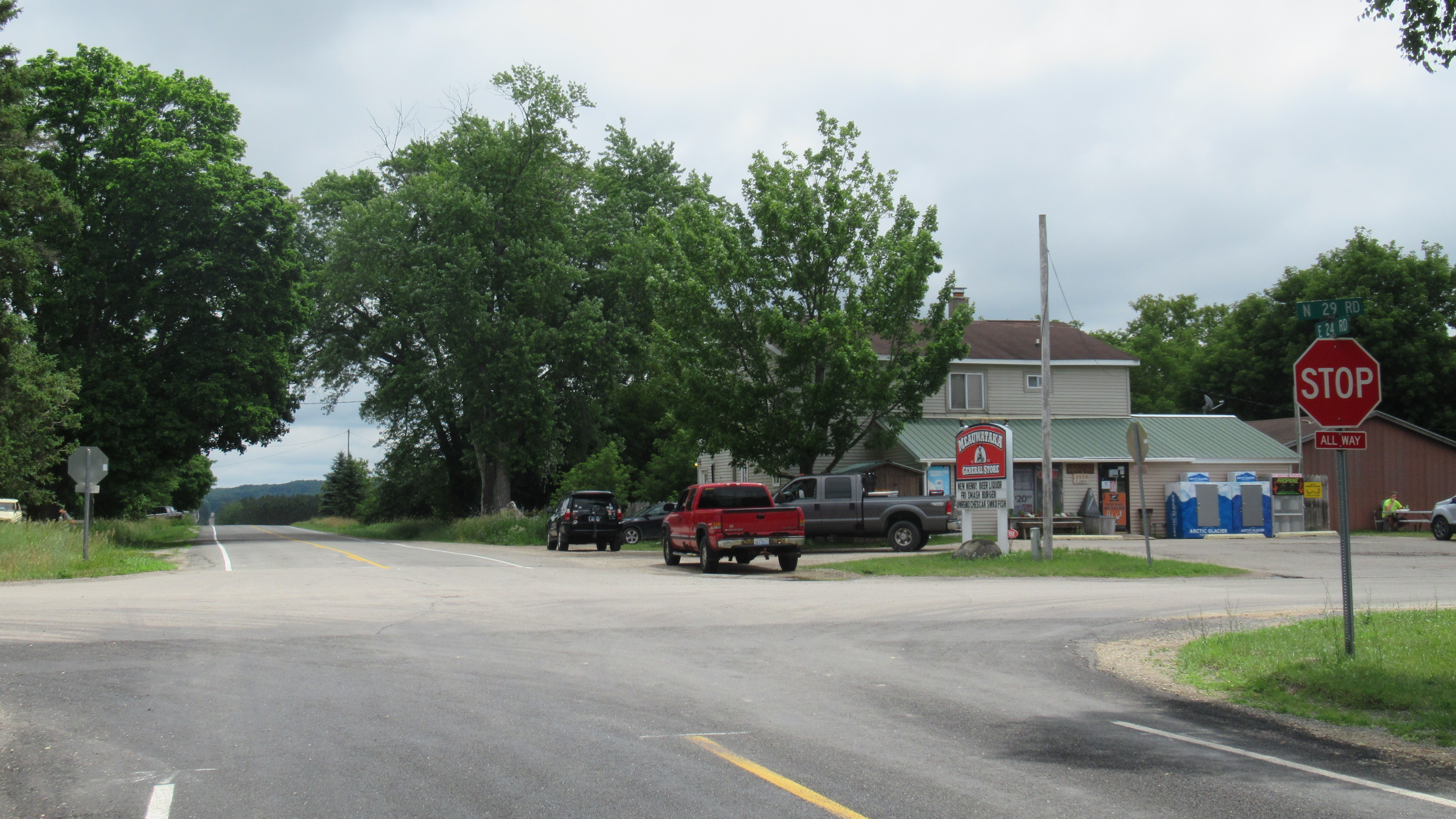
Unincorporated community of Meauwataka

Colfax Township is a civil township of Wexford County in the U.S. state of Michigan. The population was 897 at the 2020 census.

== Communities ==
- Meauwataka is an unincorporated community in the township at 44°21′11″N 85°32′23″W. The community was first settled in 1867 near Lake Meauwataka, which was originally called Lake Dayhuff. A post office named Meauwataka began operating on May 2, 1872 with Enos Dayduff serving as the first postmaster. The post office remained in operation until April 30, 1952.
- Soper is a former community that began as a sawmill settlement in the township, and a post office briefly operated under the name Soper from March 23, 1900 until August 31, 1901.

== Geography ==
According to the U.S. Census Bureau, the township has a total area of 35.40 square miles (91.69 km^{2}), of which 35.26 square miles (91.32 km^{2}) is land and 0.14 square miles (0.36 km^{2}) (0.40%) is water.

== Demographics ==
At the 2000 census, there were 763 people, 286 households and 229 families residing in the township. The population density was 21.6 per square mile (8.3/km^{2}). There were 411 housing units at an average density of 11.6 per square mile (4.5/km^{2}). The racial makeup of the township was 99.74% White, 0.13% from other races, and 0.13% from two or more races. Hispanic or Latino of any race were 0.13% of the population.

There were 286 households, of which 34.3% had children under the age of 18 living with them, 69.2% were married couples living together, 6.3% had a female householder with no husband present, and 19.9% were non-families. 17.5% of all households were made up of individuals, and 5.2% had someone living alone who was 65 years of age or older. The average household size was 2.67 and the average family size was 2.99.

27.0% of the population were under the age of 18, 8.3% from 18 to 24, 27.4% from 25 to 44, 26.9% from 45 to 64, and 10.5% who were 65 years of age or older. The median age was 38 years. For every 100 females, there were 109.6 males. For every 100 females age 18 and over, there were 111.8 males.

The median household income was $39,135 and the median family income was $41,458. Males had a median income of $30,781 versus $23,167 for females. The per capita income for the township was $16,082. About 4.5% of families and 7.6% of the population were below the poverty line, including 8.9% of those under age 18 and 4.9% of those age 65 or over.

== Education ==
Colfax Township is served by two public school districts. The majority of the township is served by Mesick Consolidated Schools to the west in Mesick, while the northeast portion of the township is served by Manton Consolidated Schools to the east in Manton.
