= Clam Lake =

Clam Lake may refer to several places in the United States:

== Michigan ==
- Clam Lake, a historic settlement that became Cadillac, Michigan, in Wexford County
- Clam Lake Township, Michigan, in Wexford County
- Clam Lake Canal, in Wexford County
- Clam Lake (Waterford Township, Michigan), a lake in Oakland County
- Clam Lake, a lake in the Elk River Chain of Lakes Watershed, Antrim County

== Other states ==
- Clam Lake, Wisconsin, an unincorporated community
- Clam Lake, a lake in Martin County, Minnesota

== See also ==
- Clam River (disambiguation)
