= Boven Earthwork =

Archaeological site in Michigan, United States

- Boven Earthworks
- U.S. National Register of Historic Places
- Location: Reeder Township, Michigan
- Nearest city: Lake City, Michigan
- Area: less than one acre
- NRHP reference No.: 73002293
- Added to NRHP: August 14, 1973

The Boven Earthworks, also known as the Boven Enclosure, the Mosquito Creek Earthworks, the Falmouth Inclosure, or Missaukee III is a Native American archaeological site designated 20MA19 located near Falmouth and Lake City, Michigan along Mosquito Creek. It was listed on the National Register of Historic Places in 1973.

== Description ==
The Boven Earthworks includes four enclosures, with an associated burial mound.

== History ==
The Boven Earthworks were likely constructed around AD 1470 +/-100.

The first circle was discovered by University of Michigan researchers in the summer of 1924 while they studied the nearby Aetna Earthworks.

Excavations were conducted on different circles by staff led by Emerson Greenman from the University of Michigan in 1926 and by Charles Cleland from Michigan State University in 1965. They found light habitation debris and no palisade or wall indications. At least one circle had two breaches likely used as gateways, all similar to Aetna.

The site was listed on the National Register of Historic Places in 1973.
