= Mitchell State Park =

Park in Michigan, USA

William Mitchell State Park
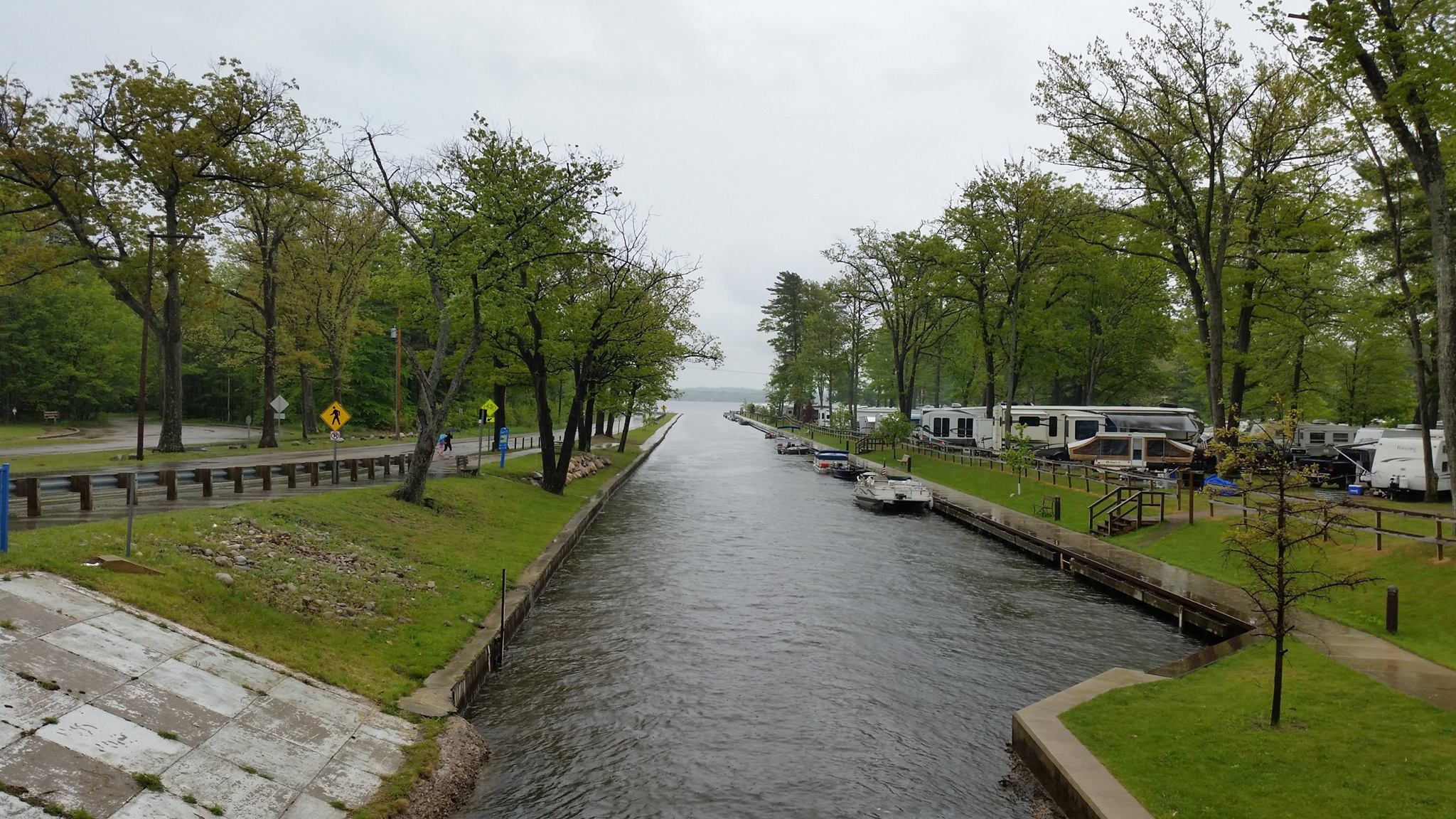
- Clam Lake Canal with campground on the right

- Location within Michigan Location within the United States
- Location: Cadillac, Wexford County, Michigan, United States
- Coordinates: 44°14′17″N 85°27′08″W
- Area: 660 acres (270 ha)
- Elevation: 1,289 feet (393 m)
- Established: 1920
- Administrator: Michigan Department of Natural Resources
- Visitors: 155,633 (in 1996)
- Designation: Michigan state park
- Named for: William W. Mitchell
- Website: Official website

William Mitchell State Park is a public recreation area covering 660 acres (270 ha) on the southwest side of Cadillac in northern lower Michigan. The state park is located between Lake Mitchell and Lake Cadillac. The historic Clam Lake Canal, approximately one-third of a mile in length, connects the two lakes and runs directly through the park. Dug in 1873 at the direction of city father George A. Mitchell, the canal allowed felled trees to be floated from Lake Mitchell to lumber mills on Lake Cadillac.

== History ==
The park bears the name of William W. Mitchell, who during the 1890s operated sawmills in the area as co-owner of the Cobbs and Mitchell Mill No. 1, and who was a nephew of city founder George Mitchell. Under the name Cadillac State Park, it was among 13 parks established in 1920 following the creation of the Michigan State Parks Commission a year earlier. The park's "prime real estate" was donated by Mitchell's widow, Ellen, who requested the park be named in her late husband's honor.

== Features ==
The park is home to Carl T. Johnson Hunting and Fishing Center which documents the history of hunting and fishing, offers seminars, workshops and audio-visual presentations, and includes an exhibit hall which displays local wildlife species.

== Activities and amenities ==
The park offers a campground with 221 sites, cabins, two boat launches, playground, beach, picnicking facilities, and fishing for perch, walleye, panfish, and bass. The 2.5-mile (4.0 km) Heritage Nature Trail runs through a woodland and marsh environment. The trail, mostly a woodchip path with a series of bridges and boardwalks, provides a study area supporting a variety of plants and wildlife. Winter activities include snowmobiling, ice fishing, snowshoeing, and cross-country skiing.

== Images ==
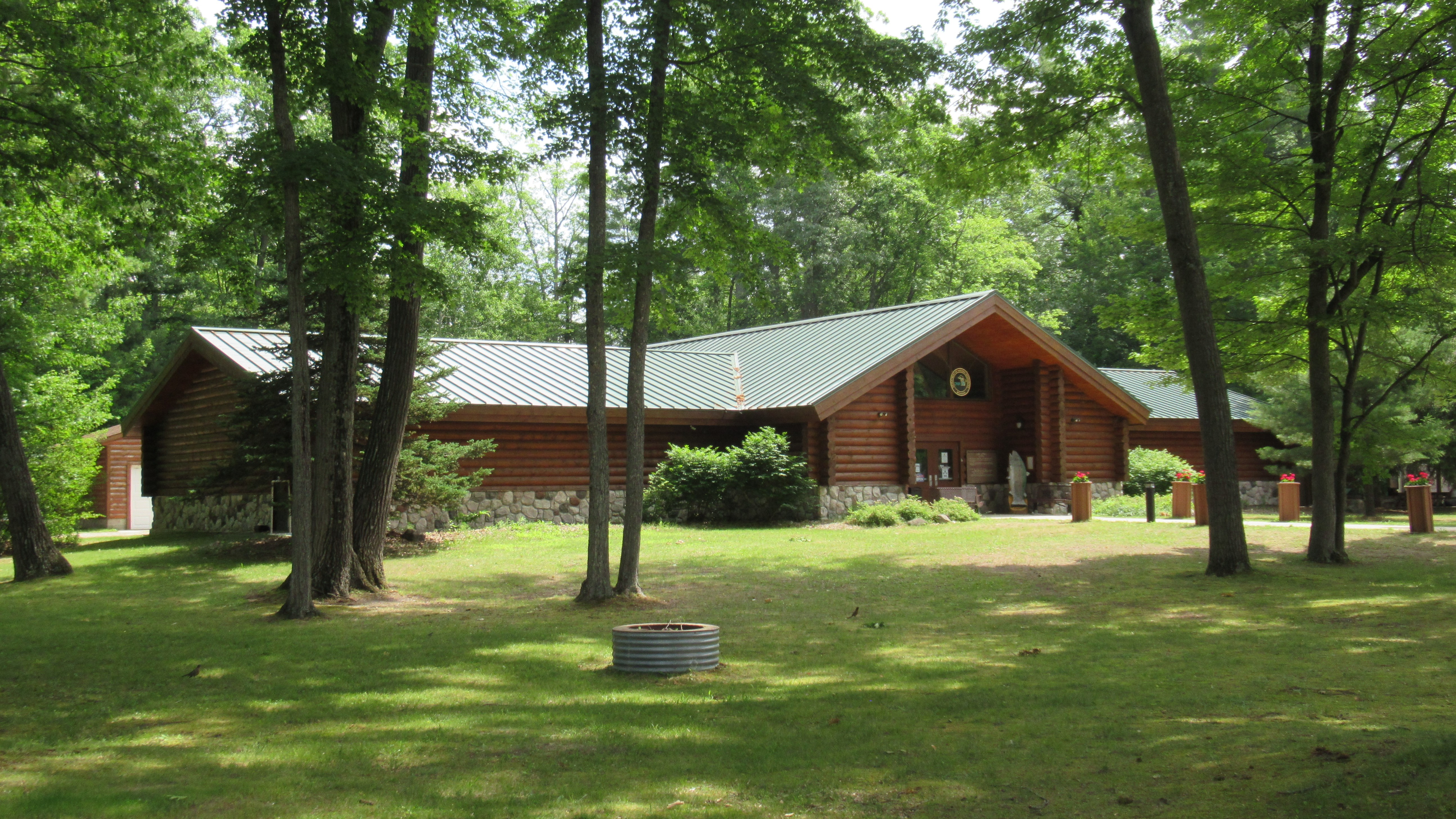
Johnson Hunting and Fishing Center

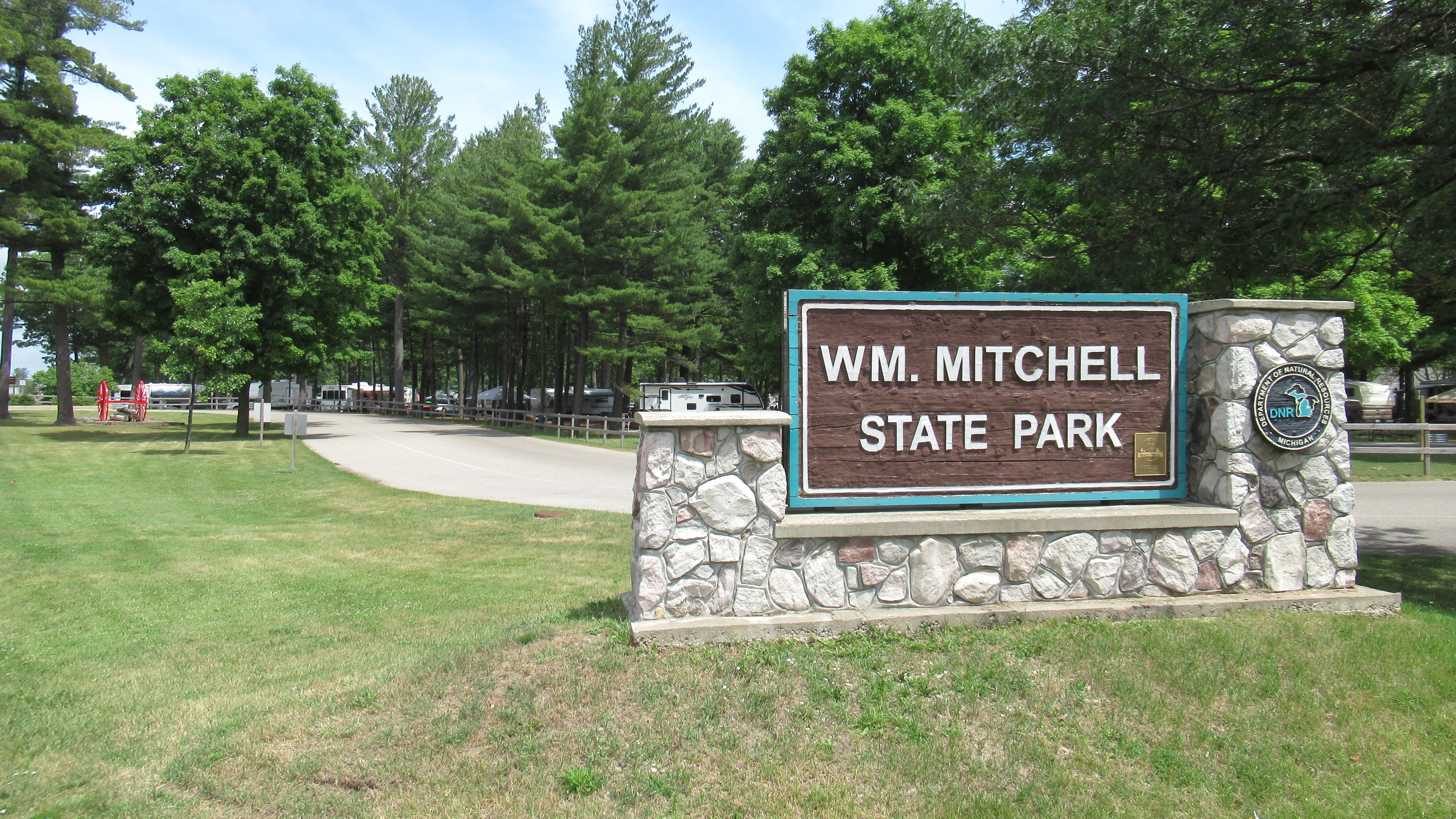
Main entrance park signage

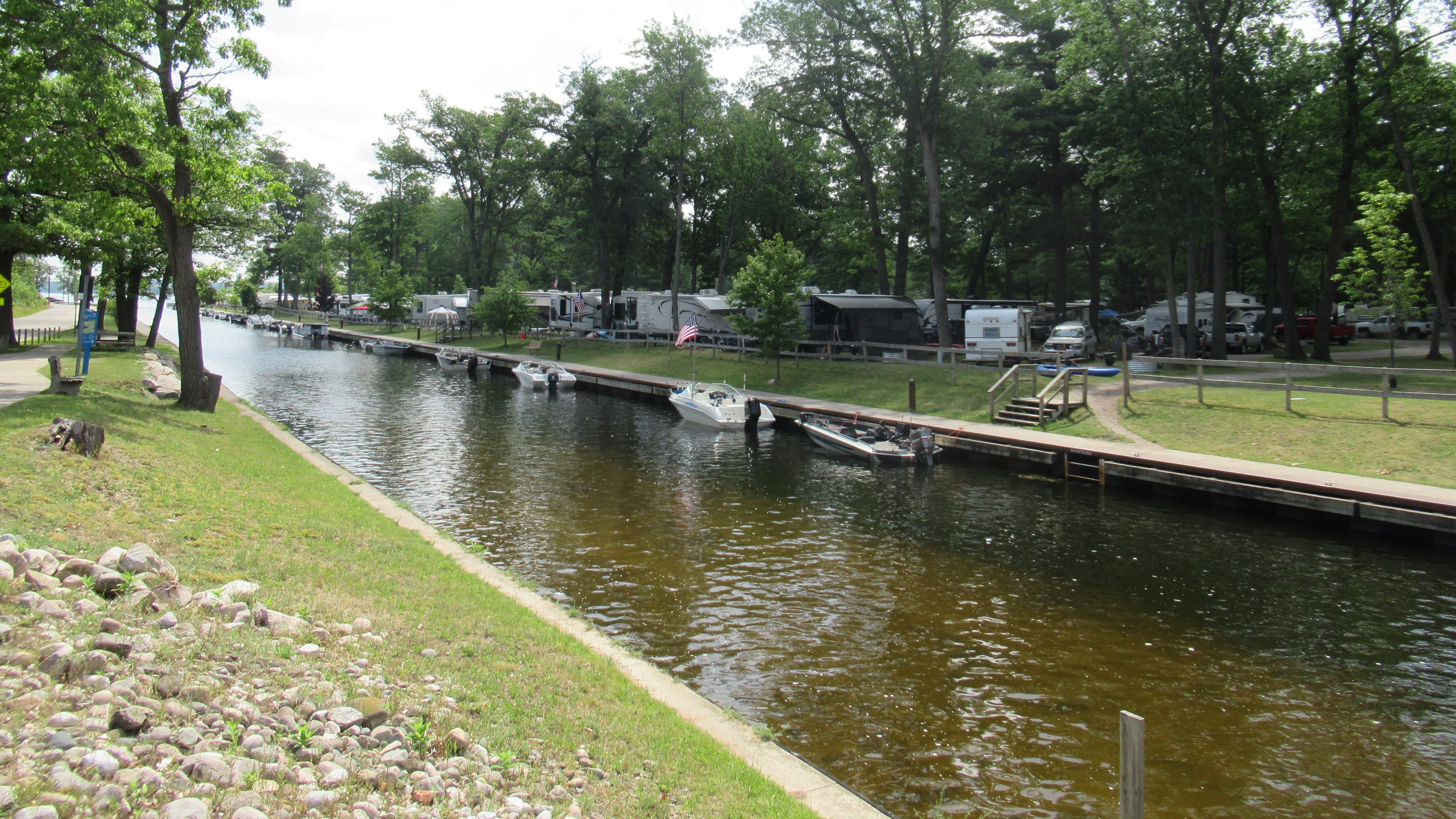
Clam Lake Canal and campground

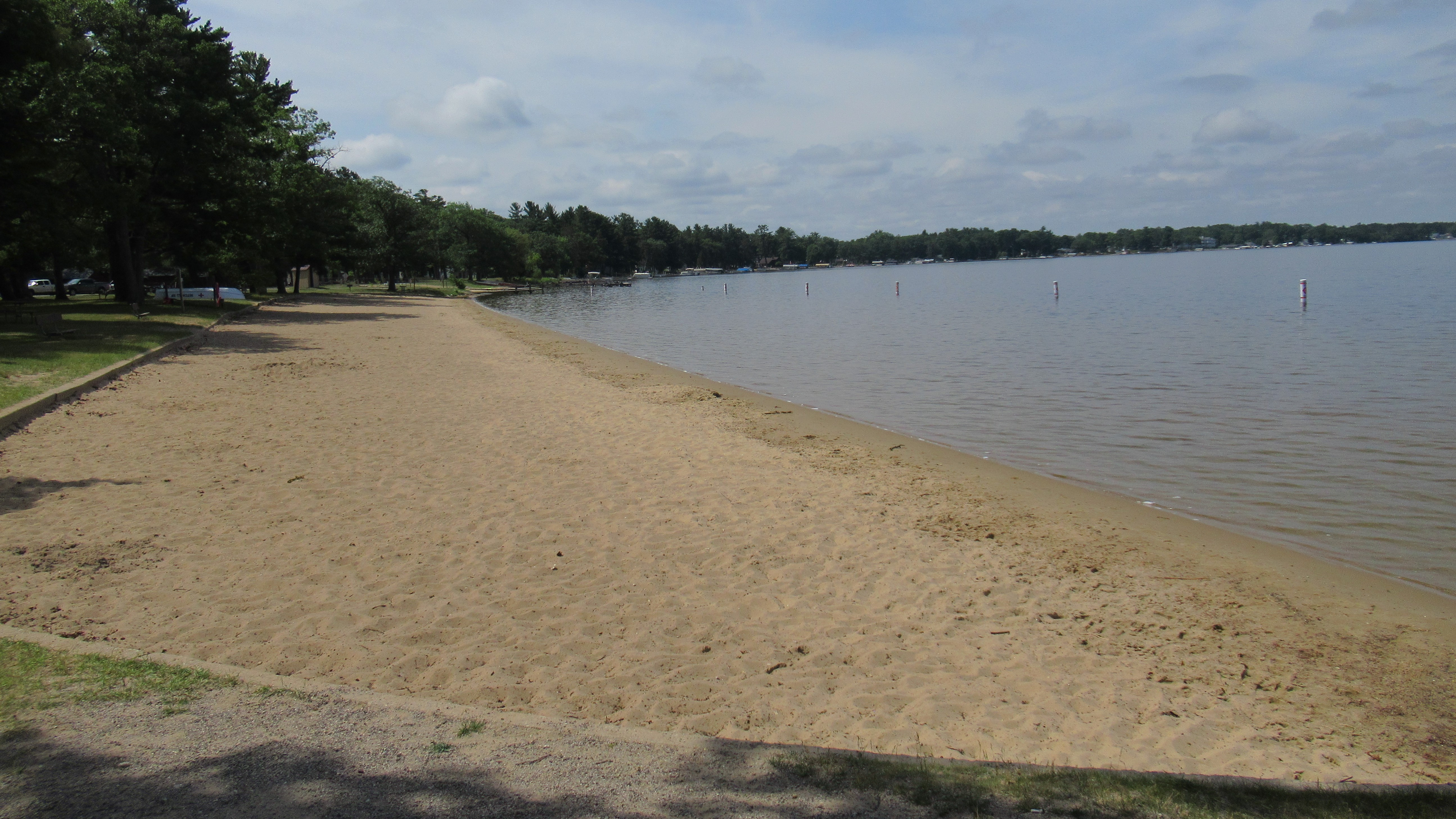
Beachfront along Lake Mitchell
