= Clam River =

Clam River may refer to:

- Clam River (Michigan)
- Clam River (Wisconsin)

== See also ==
- Clam Lake (disambiguation)
