= Bert Zagers =

American football player (1933–1992)

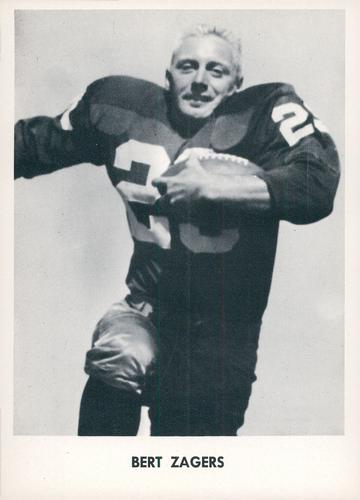

No. 29
- Positions: Halfback, defensive back

Personal information
- Born: January 30, 1933; Fremont, Michigan, U.S.
- Died: September 2, 1992 (aged 59); Traverse City, Michigan, U.S.
- Listed height: 5 ft 10 in (1.78 m)
- Listed weight: 185 lb (84 kg)

Career information
- High school: Cadillac (Cadillac, Michigan)
- College: Michigan State (1951–1954)
- NFL draft: 1955: 7th round, 84th overall pick

Career history
- Washington Redskins (1955, 1957–1958)

Awards and highlights
- National champion (1952)

Career NFL statistics
- Rushing yards: 477
- Rushing average: 4.1
- Receptions: 17
- Receiving yards: 356
- Total touchdowns: 6
- Stats at Pro Football Reference

Bert Aldon Zagers (January 30, 1933 – September 2, 1992) was an American professional football player who split time between offensive and defensive halfback and special teams for the Washington Redskins of the National Football League (NFL) for three seasons.

== Early life ==
Zagers was born in Fremont, Michigan to Evert and Opal Lee Zagers. He attended and played high school football at Cadillac High School in Cadillac, Michigan, where he won a state championship in 1949. He also participated in track and field. Zagers was inducted into the Cadillac High School Hall of Fame in 1951.

== College career ==
Zagers attended and played college football at Michigan State University. In 1952, the Spartans completed a perfect undefeated season and were recognized as the national champions by most major polling organizations including the AP Poll and Coaches' Poll.

== Professional career ==
Zagers was drafted 84th overall in the seventh round of the 1955 NFL draft by the Detroit Lions. He was then traded to the Washington Redskins, along with Bob Trout, for Harry Gilmer. Zagers played his entire career with the Redskins and in 1957, he led the NFL in punt returns.

== Personal life ==
Zagers fought with the United States Army in the Korean War, where he attained the rank of private first class. After retiring from playing, he was the head coach at Theodore Roosevelt High School in Wyandotte, Michigan in the late 1960s and early 1970s. He died on September 2, 1992, in Traverse City, Michigan.
