= Falmouth, Michigan =

- Census-designated place (CDP) & unincorporated community
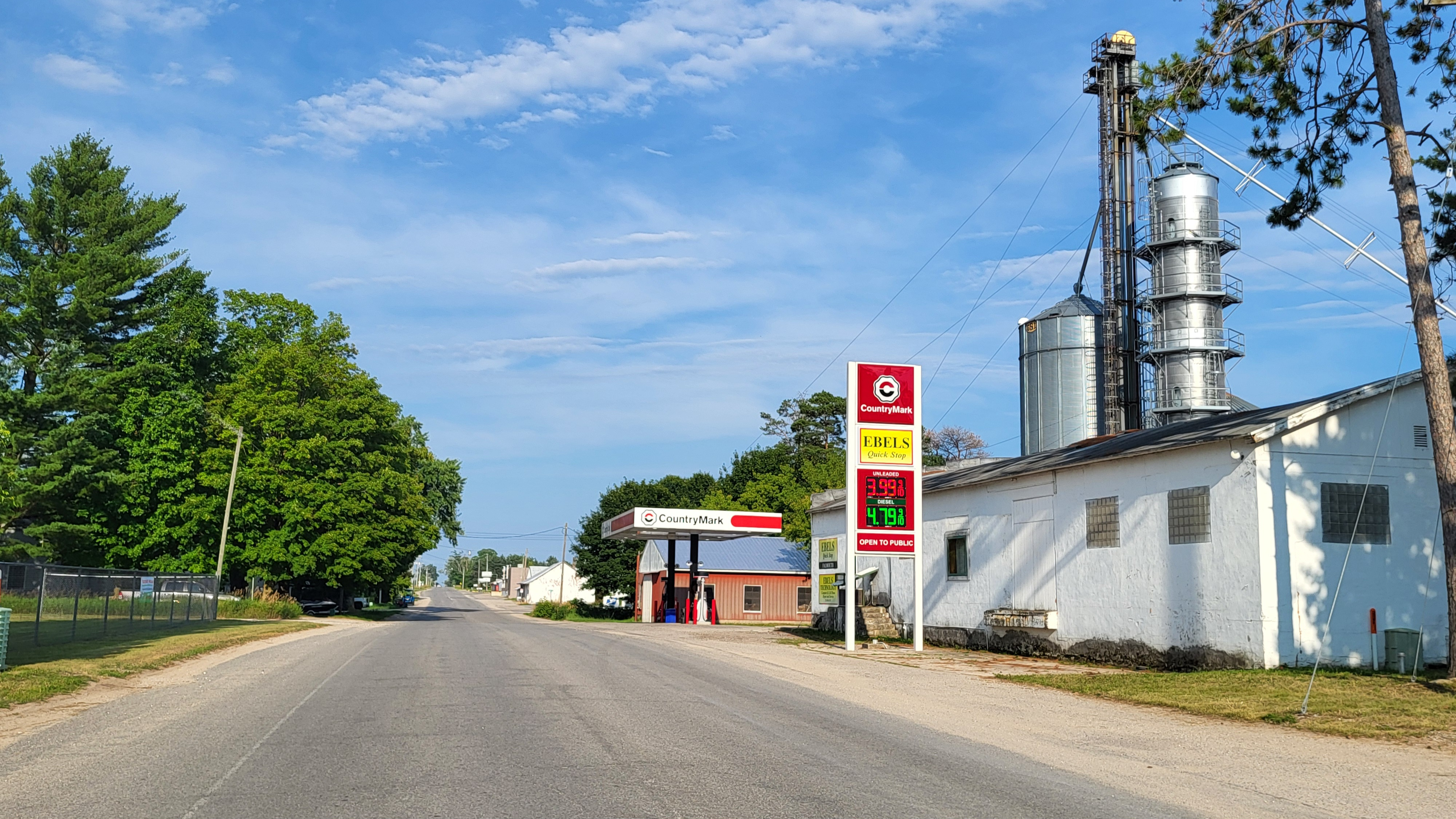
- Looking east along E. Prosper Road

- Location within Missaukee County

- Location within the state of Michigan Location within the United States
- Coordinates: 44°14′36″N 85°05′13″W
- Country: United States
- State: Michigan
- County: Missaukee
- Township: Clam Union
- Settled: 1871

Area
  - Total: 0.68 sq mi (1.76 km^{2})
  - Land: 0.68 sq mi (1.76 km^{2})
  - Water: 0 sq mi (0.00 km^{2})

Population (2020)
  - Total: 183
  - Density: 269.2/sq mi (103.95/km^{2})
- Time zone: UTC-5 (Eastern (EST))
  - Summer (DST): UTC-4 (EDT)
- ZIP code(s): 49632
- Area code: 231
- GNIS feature ID: 625817
- FIPS code: 26-27320

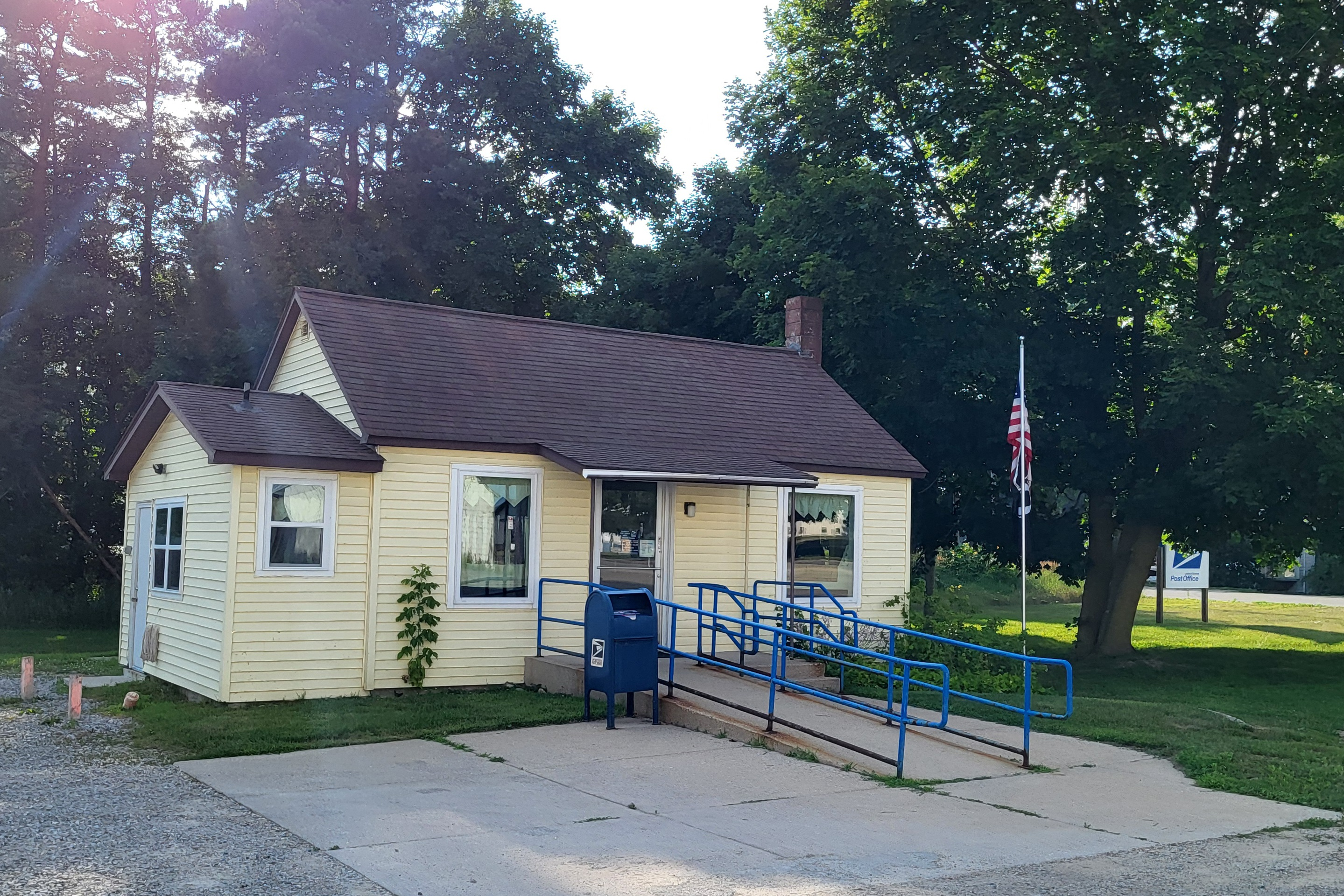
U.S. Post Office in Falmouth

Falmouth is an unincorporated community and census-designated place (CDP) in Missaukee County in the U.S. state of Michigan. The community is located within Clam Union Township. The population was 183 at the 2020 census.

== History ==
It began as a lumbering settlement and first was known as Pinhook. A post office named Falmouth was established on December 18, 1871, with Eugene W. Watson as the first postmaster. In 1873, Falmouth nearly became the county seat, losing to Reeder (now Lake City) by one vote. John Koopman built a store there in 1879, and in 1881 bought the village plat, along with its saw, shingle, and gristmill.

The town has an annual event, The Falmouth Youth show, as a town fair showcasing animal showmanship and a craft show. On the Fourth of July, the town has a fireworks display at The Falmouth Dam after a music performance.

== Geography ==
Falmouth is in southern Missaukee County, in the northwest corner of Clam Union Township. It is 12 miles (19 km) by road southeast of Lake City, the county seat, and 9 miles (14 km) northeast of McBain.

According to the U.S. Census Bureau, the Falmouth CDP has an area of 0.68 square miles (1.76 km^{2}), all of it land. The Clam River, a south-flowing tributary of the Muskegon River, runs along the southwest edge of the community.

== Demographics ==
The median age of the people in Falmouth is 34.1. Falmouth has a larger male population, 53% of the population being male, while 47% is female. Of the people in Falmouth, 90% are White, and the next most populous ethnicity is 8% Hispanic population.

Historical population
Census	Pop.	Note	%±
2020	183		—
U.S. Decennial Census

== Transportation ==
Main roads that provide access to Falmouth are Prosper Road (to the east), 7 Mile Road (to the northeast), Forward Road (to the north and south), and Falmouth Road (to the west).
