= Lake Cadillac =

Lake in the state of Michigan, United States

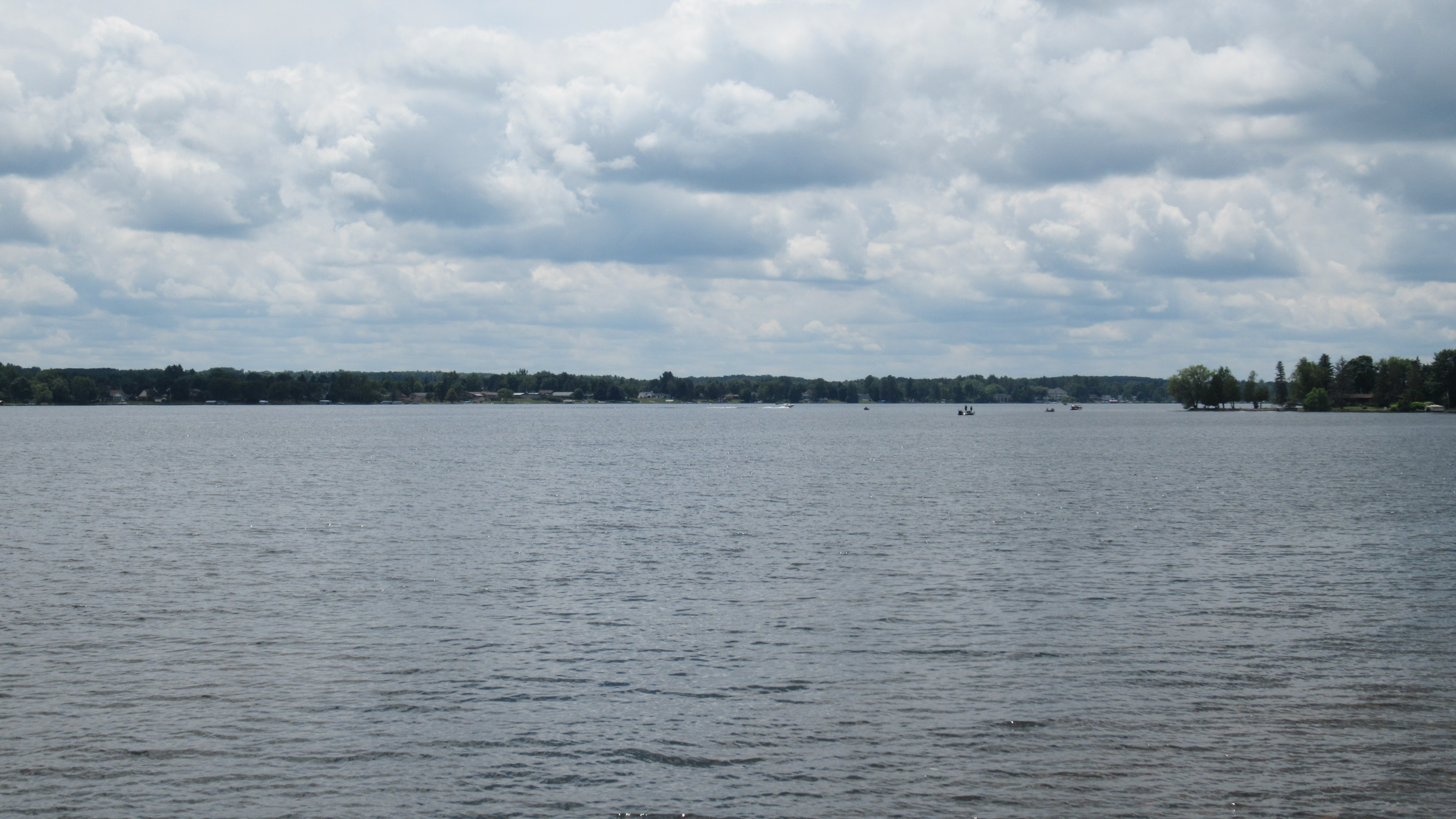
- View from the eastern end of Lake Cadillac

- Location within the state of Michigan
- Location: Cadillac, Wexford County, Michigan
- Coordinates: 44°14′23″N 85°25′39″W
- Type: Kettle (landform)
- Primary inflows: Clam Lake Canal
- Primary outflows: Clam River
- Catchment area: 34,356 km^{2} (13,265 sq mi)
- Basin countries: United States
- Max. length: 2.6 mi (4.2 km)
- Max. width: .82 mi (1.32 km)
- Surface area: 1,150 acres (4.7 km^{2})
- Average depth: 11.8 ft (3.6 m)
- Max. depth: 28 ft (8.5 m)
- Water volume: 13,458 acre⋅ft (16,600,000 m^{3})
- Shore length^{1}: 7.77 mi (12.50 km)
- Surface elevation: 1,289 ft (393 m)
- Settlements: Cadillac
- ^{1} Shore length is not a well-defined measure.

Lake Cadillac is a lake located within the city of Cadillac, Michigan. It is part of the Muskegon River watershed.

== Natural features ==
Lake Cadillac is fed by two inlets: a small river flowing from Lake Mitchell and a short canal of the same origin. There is one outlet, the Clam River.

In 2005, infestations of Eurasian water milfoil were discovered. During the summer, over a quarter of the lake's surface area became inhabited by the milfoil. Treatments for the invasive began in 2006. In 2007 the infestation was brought down to acceptable levels.

== History ==
Historically, Lake Cadillac was referred to as Little Clam Lake.

In 1873, local businessman George A. Mitchell founded the village of Clam Lake (renamed Cadillac, Michigan, in 1882) and constructed the Clam Lake Canal, connecting Little Clam Lake to Big Clam Lake. At the time, the canal enabled logging on the west side of Big Clam Lake; logs floated through the canal entered Little Clam Lake, on the east shore of which stood lumber mills, the railroad and the Village of Clam Lake.

The names of the two lakes were changed in 1903, with Little Clam Lake renamed as Lake Cadillac (for the renamed community) and Big Clam Lake as Lake Mitchell, in honor of William W. Mitchell, the nephew and business partner of George A. Mitchell.

Following the passing of the lumber era the lake became a regional tourist destination. William Mitchell State Park, popular with campers, now occupies the west shore of the lake, adjacent to the canal.

== See also ==
- List of lakes in Michigan
