= Cadillac Evening News =

Daily newspaper in Cadillac, Michigan, U.S.

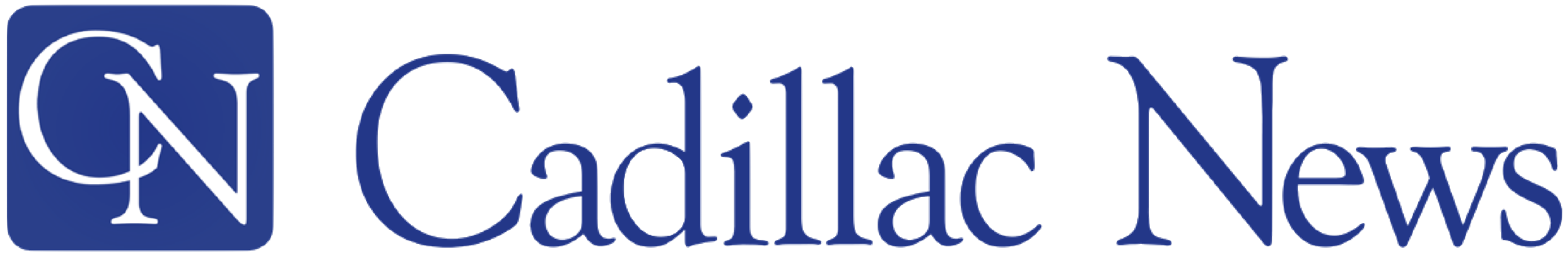
- Type: Daily newspaper
- Format: Broadsheet
- Publisher: Christopher Huckle
- Editor: Matthew Seward
- Founded: 1872
- Headquarters: 130 N. Mitchell Street; Cadillac, Michigan 49601; United States
- Circulation: 6,588 (as of 2022)
- OCLC number: 012691349
- Website: cadillacnews.com

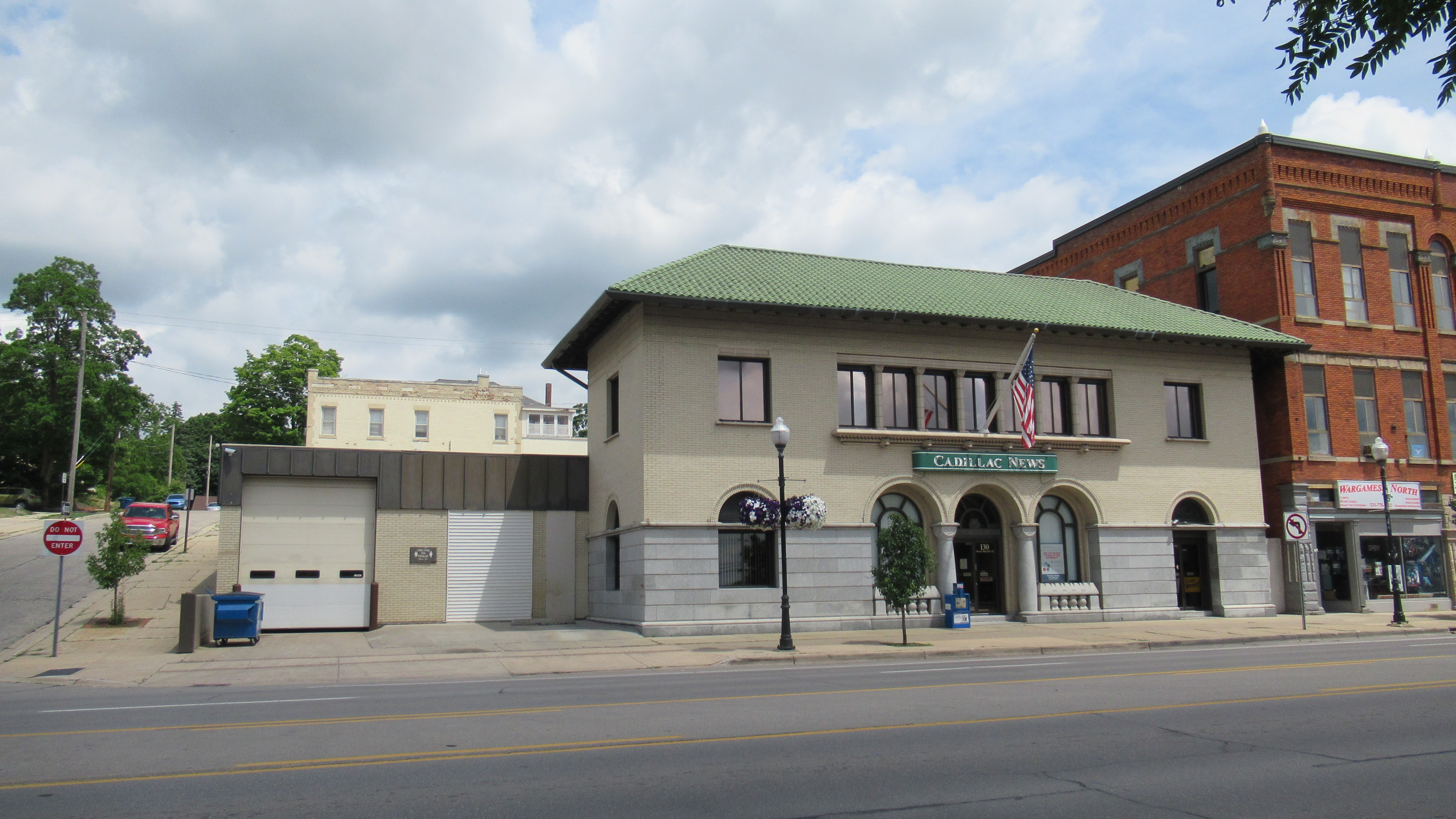
Headquarters of Cadillac Evening News

The Cadillac Evening News is a daily newspaper in Cadillac, Michigan. The newspaper started publishing in 1872.
