= Clam River (Michigan) =

River in Michigan, United States

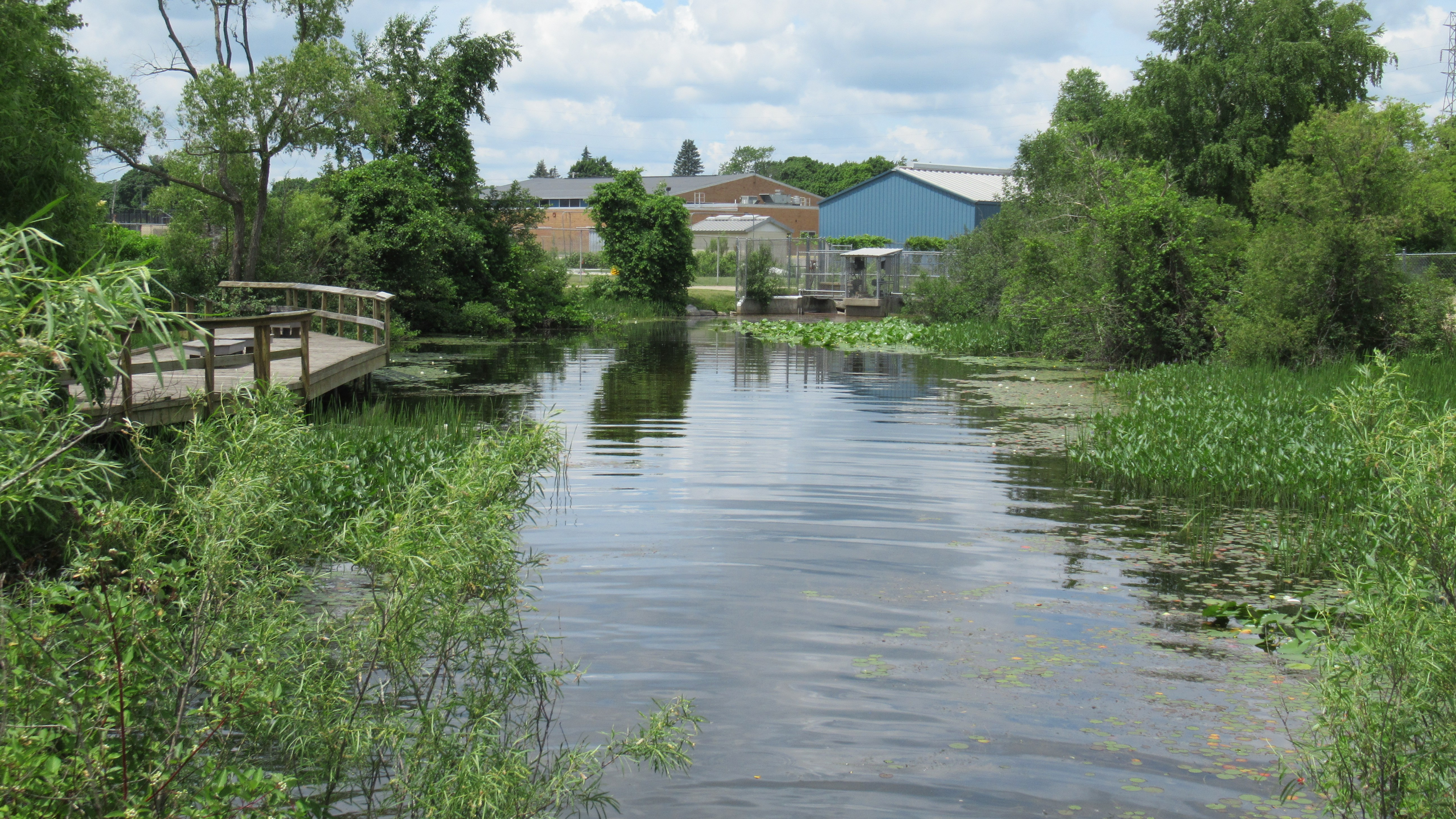
- Clam River near its source in Cadillac

- Location of the Clam River's mouth

Location
- Country: United States
- State: Michigan
- Region: Northern Michigan

Physical characteristics
- Source
  - location: Lake Cadillac in Cadillac
  - coordinates: 44°15′04″N 85°24′37″W
- Mouth
  - location: Muskegon River near Temple
  - coordinates: 44°05′22″N 85°00′12″W
- Length: 51 mi (82 km)

Basin features
- Progression: Lake Mitchell → Lake Cadillac → Clam River → Muskegon River → Lake Michigan

The Clam River is a 51.1-mile-long (82.2 km) tributary of the Muskegon River in Wexford, Missaukee, and Clare counties in the U.S. state of Michigan. The source of the river is located in downtown Cadillac, at the eponymous Lake Cadillac, adjacent to Cadillac High School. The river flows east and southeast and ends at the Muskegon River a few miles north of Temple.
