= George A. Mitchell =

American politician and businessman (1824–1878)

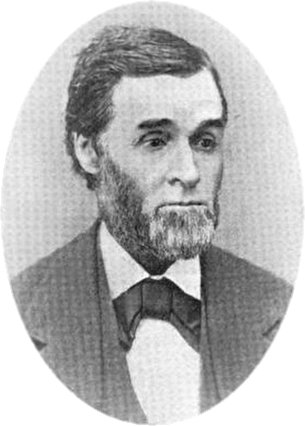

1st Mayor of Cadillac
- In office 1877–1878
- Preceded by: Office established
- Succeeded by: Jacob Cummer

Personal details
- Born: January 8, 1824 Root, New York, U.S.
- Died: August 5, 1878 (aged 54) Cadillac, Michigan, U.S.
- Party: Republican
- Spouse: Marietta L. Wilkins
- Children: 5
- Occupation: Businessman, merchant, railwayman, lumber baron, real estate developer, politician

George A. Mitchell (January 8, 1824 – August 5, 1878) was an American businessman, merchant, railwayman, lumber baron, and real estate developer. In the 1870s he bought 2,000 acres (810 ha) of land in Michigan, divided and sold it in lots, and established the village of Clam Lake. The village's name later changed to Cadillac, with Mitchell as its founder becoming its first mayor.

== Early life ==
Mitchell was born January 8, 1824, in Root, New York. He was the youngest member of a family of twelve children. His father was Charles Mitchell, a merchant-farmer of Montgomery County, New York. Mitchell's paternal grandfather, Andrew Mitchell, was a major in the American Revolutionary War. His mother, whose maiden name was Lydia Brown, was a descendant of Robert Barclay of the Barclay clan. Barclay was a governor of the East Jersey colony in North America in the 1680s. Mitchell was nineteen years old when he moved out of the home.

== Midlife ==
Mitchell left home in 1843 and went to Sprakers, New York, and began clerking in a store. He accepted a similar position in 1850 in a retail store in Canajoharie, New York. Mitchell worked there for several years, and later engaged in a tanning business at Black Lake, New York, with his business partner Austin Strong. In 1861, he sold his interest in this enterprise to his partner and moved to northern Indiana, settling at Kendallville, Indiana. An older brother, William Mitchell, had already moved there from Root, New York.

In 1861, at the beginning of the American Civil War, the army made Mitchell a paymaster based in St. Louis, Missouri. He developed his accounting and business skills and was promoted to lieutenant colonel. In this capacity Mitchell was put in charge at Little Rock, Arkansas, and Memphis, Tennessee, at different times. He was also the pay department manager during the Vicksburg Campaign and had additional responsibilities there. He often had charge of five to 20 subordinate paymasters handling millions of dollars in payrolls. After six years in the military, he was mustered out at Vicksburg, Mississippi.

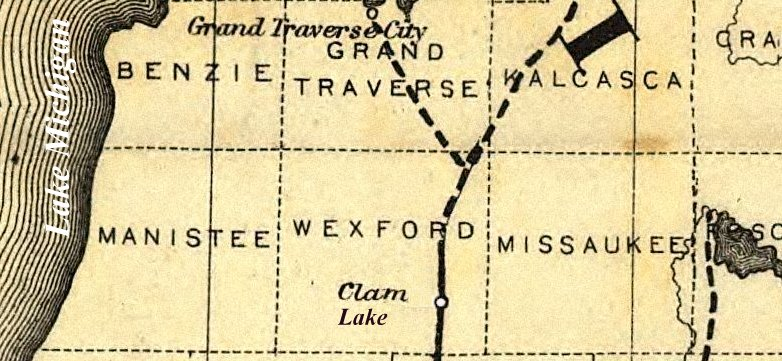
Clam Lake, later known as Cadillac (lower center), shown on an 1872 map as the sole stop in Wexford County and the northernmost stop on the Grand Rapids & Indiana railroad line

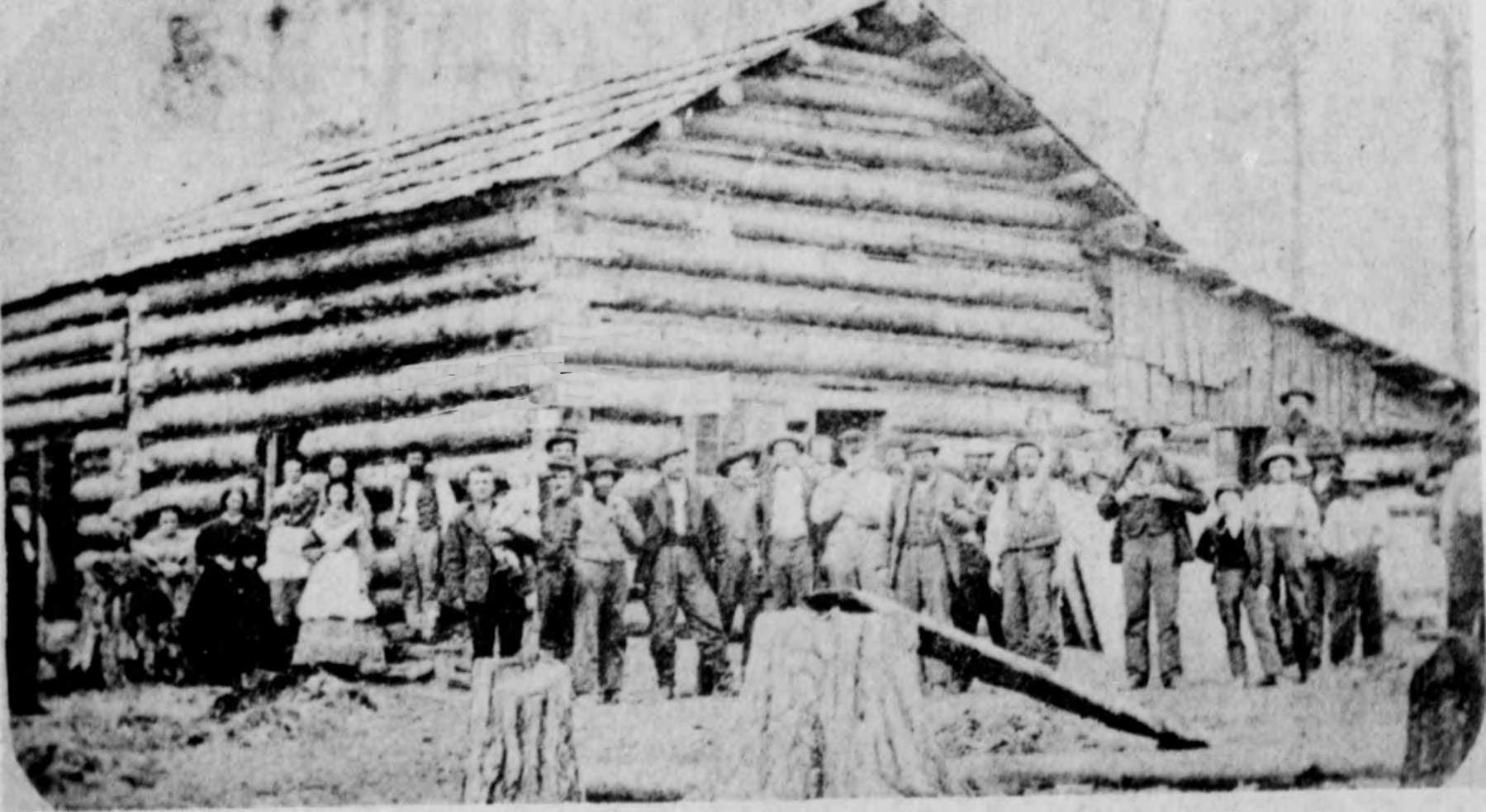
Clam Lake Hotel ("Mitchell House") 1872, first official village business establishment

After leaving the military in 1867, Mitchell went into the banking business in Kendallville, Indiana. There he formed a business partnership with William Innes, who was associated with the Grand Rapids and Indiana Railroad. Innes surveyed a route for a railroad line in the Lower Peninsula of Michigan that was to run directly from Hobart, Indiana, to Manton, Michigan, by way of Clam Lake, Michigan (later called Cadillac). In 1870, Mitchell and Innes traveled along part of the proposed right of way route from Big Rapids to Fife Lake, Michigan, scouting it out.

When they came to the area between Little Clam Lake and Big Clam Lake, Mitchell persuaded Innes that the original route layout between the lakes should be redirected to run to the eastern end of the Little Clam Lake in the southeast corner of Wexford County, Michigan. He wanted the railroad route to run there because he was planning the development of a new town, Clam Lake (early Cadillac). The railroad, and the lumber business he envisioned, was to be an important part of the village's development. Mitchell would later have the Clam Lake Canal dug, connecting the two lakes and allowing for logs to be floated across them.

Mitchell purchased some 2,000 acres (810 ha) of timber land at Little Clam Lake in 1871 and 1872. By then it had been determined that the railroad would be routed this way. He divided the land into lots of various sizes and started selling them to develop the village at Clam Lake into a potential town with businesses. There was a post office established there in January 1872 that started the town. He was successful in enticing entrepreneurs to start businesses that opened later in 1872.

In 1876, Mitchell moved his family from Kendallville to his new village in Michigan. Later, the village changed its name to the town of Clam-Union. In 1877 the name was changed again, this time to the City of Cadillac, and it was recognized officially by the state of Michigan. There were about 650 people and 350 school-age children in Clam Lake township as reported by the 1880 census. The city of Cadillac, incorporated in 1877, 1885 and 1895, was later divided into four wards and became the county seat of Wexford County.

Mitchell was the city's major developer, and for that has been called the father of Cadillac. He took up the business of lumbering in Cadillac, and constructed three sawmills with high production capabilities that produced millions of board feet each year. Eventually, he became a lumber baron in Michigan, and through his lumber enterprise, he contributed timber for a number of private and public buildings in the city of Cadillac. He became its first mayor. He made other important improvements to the city as well, like the formation of the Clam Lake Improvement and Construction Company that built the Clam Lake Canal between Lake Mitchell and Lake Cadillac for the transportation of logs going to the sawmills.

== Religion ==
Mitchell was a member of the Dutch Reformed Church in his early life; when he moved to Michigan he was associated with the Presbyterian congregation at Cadillac. He respected all churches and religions.

== Politics ==
Mitchell was a Republican and supported their local and state affairs.

== Family ==
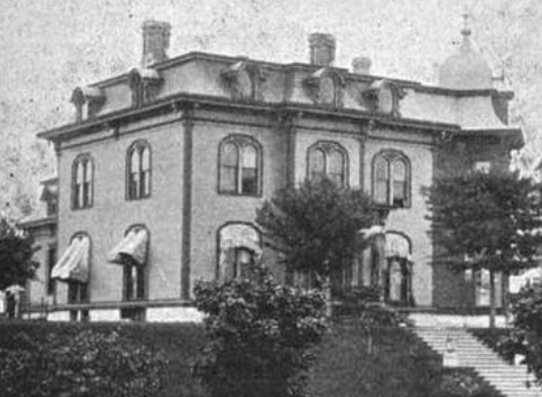
Mitchell house in Cadillac, circa. 1876

In 1847, Mitchell married Miss Marietta L. Wilkins, who had been born in Greene County, New York, in 1827. In 1832, Michell moved with his parents to Schoharie County, New York. When he married Miss Wilkins they first made their home in Sprakers and later, in 1876, in Cadillac, Michigan. They had four children. Mitchell's wife died on August 28, 1908.

== Death ==
Mitchell was thrown from a horse and buggy on August 5, 1878, and fatally injured by falling onto a tree stump not yet cleared from the street. He died at his home in Cadillac on August 8, 1878.

== Sources ==
- Clemens, William Montgomery (1916). The Mitchell Family Magazine. Higginson Book Company.
- McGee, Jean (1921). "Some Men Who Have Made Cadillac". Prize Essays Written by Pupils of Michigan Schools in the Local History Contest for 1919–20. Michigan Historical Commission. pp. 13–17. OCLC 23336005. "As the founder of this city Mr. Mitchell has rightly been called the father of Cadillac."
- Norton, Willard A. (1900). Cadillac City Directory. W.A. Norton.
- Page, H.R. (1884). Traverse Region. H. R. Page & Company. ISBN 9780598629074.
- Wheeler, John H. (1903). History of Wexford County.
- Record Publishing (1895). Portraits and Biographical Sketches. Record Publishing Company. p. 151.
