= Cadillac High School =

High school in Michigan, United States

Cadillac Senior High School
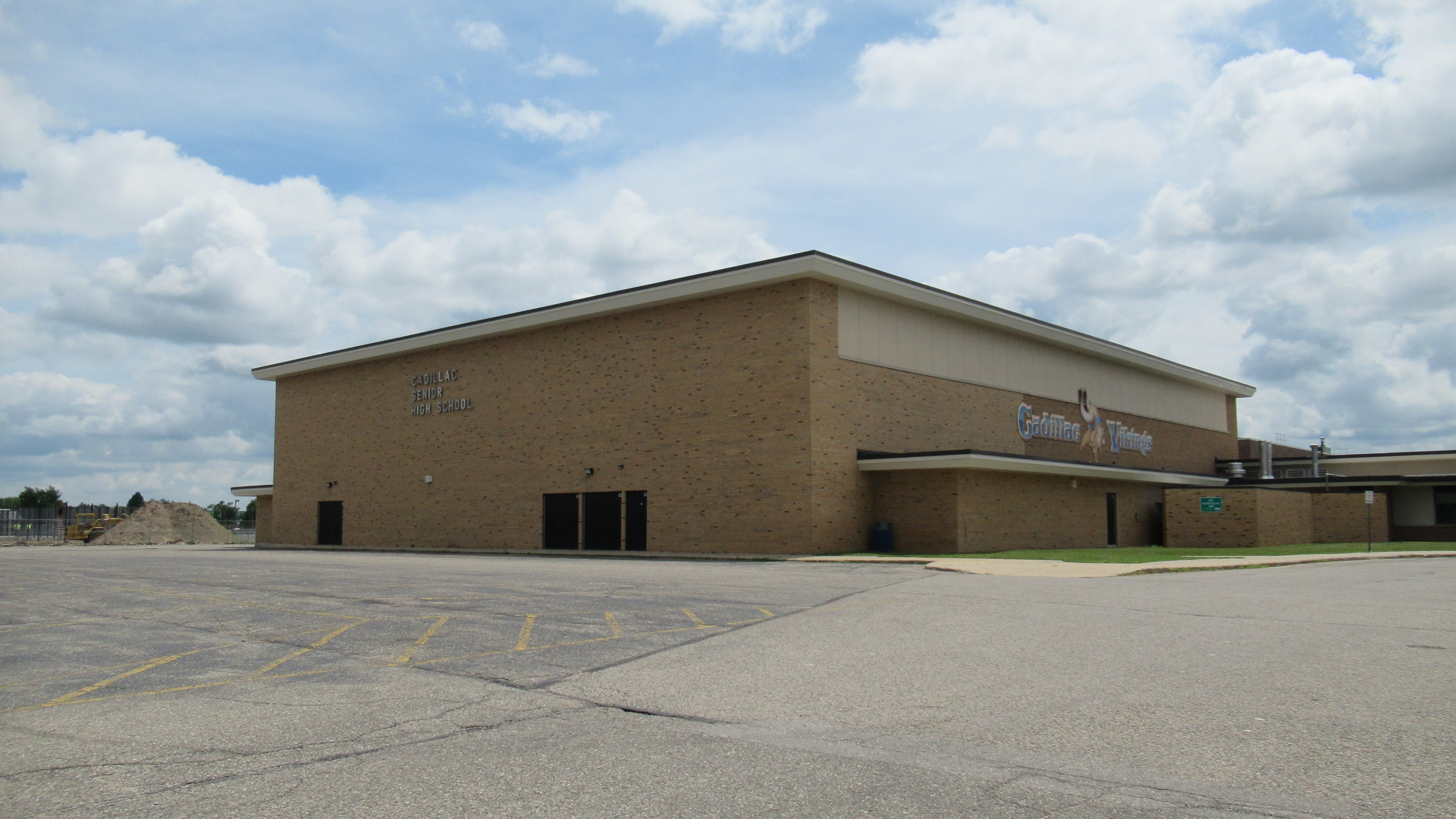
- Cadillac Senior High School gymnasium

Location
- 400 Linden Street; Cadillac, Michigan 49601; United States; 44°15′05.7″N 85°24′53.0″W

Information
- School type: Public
- Established: 1877
- School district: Cadillac Area Public Schools
- Superintendent: Jenifer Brown
- CEEB code: 230450
- Principal: Kelly Buckmaster
- Teaching staff: 41.94 (on an FTE basis)
- Grades: 9–12
- Enrollment: 884 (2023-2024)
- Student to teacher ratio: 21.08
- Colors: Navy; Gold
- Athletics: MHSAA Class A
- Athletics conference: Big North Conference
- Team name: Vikings
- Yearbook: Log
- Website: www.cadillacschools.org/o/chs

Student assessments
- 2021–22 school year Change vs. prior year

M-STEP 11th grade proficiency rates (Science / Social Studies)
- Advanced %: 18.0 / 9.3
- Proficient %: 31.7 / 27.9
- PR. Proficient %: 14.2 / 43.7
- Not Proficient %: 36.1 / 19.1

Average test scores
- SAT Total: 995.8 (▼ −5.4)

Cadillac High School (also referred to as Cadillac Senior High School) is a public high school in Cadillac, Michigan, United States. It is one of eight schools in the Cadillac Area Public Schools (CAPS) school district.

== History ==
Clam Lake Public School opened in early 1873, with 35 enrollees, and a high school unit was added in 1877. The brick Cadillac High School building was erected on the site in 1891.

=== 1975 Homecoming game ===
In October 1975, rock group Kiss visited Cadillac and performed at the Cadillac High School gymnasium. They played the concert to honor the school's football team. In previous years, the team had compiled a record of sixteen consecutive victories, but the 1974 squad opened the season with two losses. The assistant coach, Jim Neff, an English teacher and rock'n'roll fan, thought to inspire the team by playing Kiss music in the locker room. He also connected the team's game plan, K-I-S-S or "Keep It Simple Stupid", with the band. The team went on to win seven straight games and their conference co-championship. After learning of their association with the team's success, the band decided to visit the school and play for the homecoming game against the Chippewa Hills Warriors. Cadillac won the rest of the games that season.

== Demographics ==
The demographic breakdown of the 899 students enrolled in 2021-22 was:

- Male – 51.3%
- Female – 48.7%
- American Indian/Alaska Native – 0.44%
- Asian – 0.67%
- Black – 1.2%
- Hispanic – 3.0%
- Native Hawaiian/Pacific Islander – 0.33%
- White – 91.8%
- Multiracial – 2.6%

Additionally, 411 students (45.7%) were eligible for reduced-price or free lunch.

== Academics ==
In 2015, U.S. News ranked Cadillac High School #949 it in its list of "America's Best High Schools".

== Athletics ==
Cadillac's athletic teams are known as the Vikings. Sports include football, volleyball, cross country, soccer, tennis, basketball, track, softball, skiing, cheerleading, ice hockey, wrestling, bowling and girls' swimming.

== Notable alumni ==
- Paul McMullen (1972–2021), middle-distance runner, Olympian
- Jackie Swanson (b. 1963), actress
- Guy Vander Jagt (1931–2007), U.S. congressman
- Bert Zagers (1933–1992), former American football player in the National Football League
