= Aetna Earthworks =

Archaeological site in Michigan, United States

- U.S. National Register of Historic Places
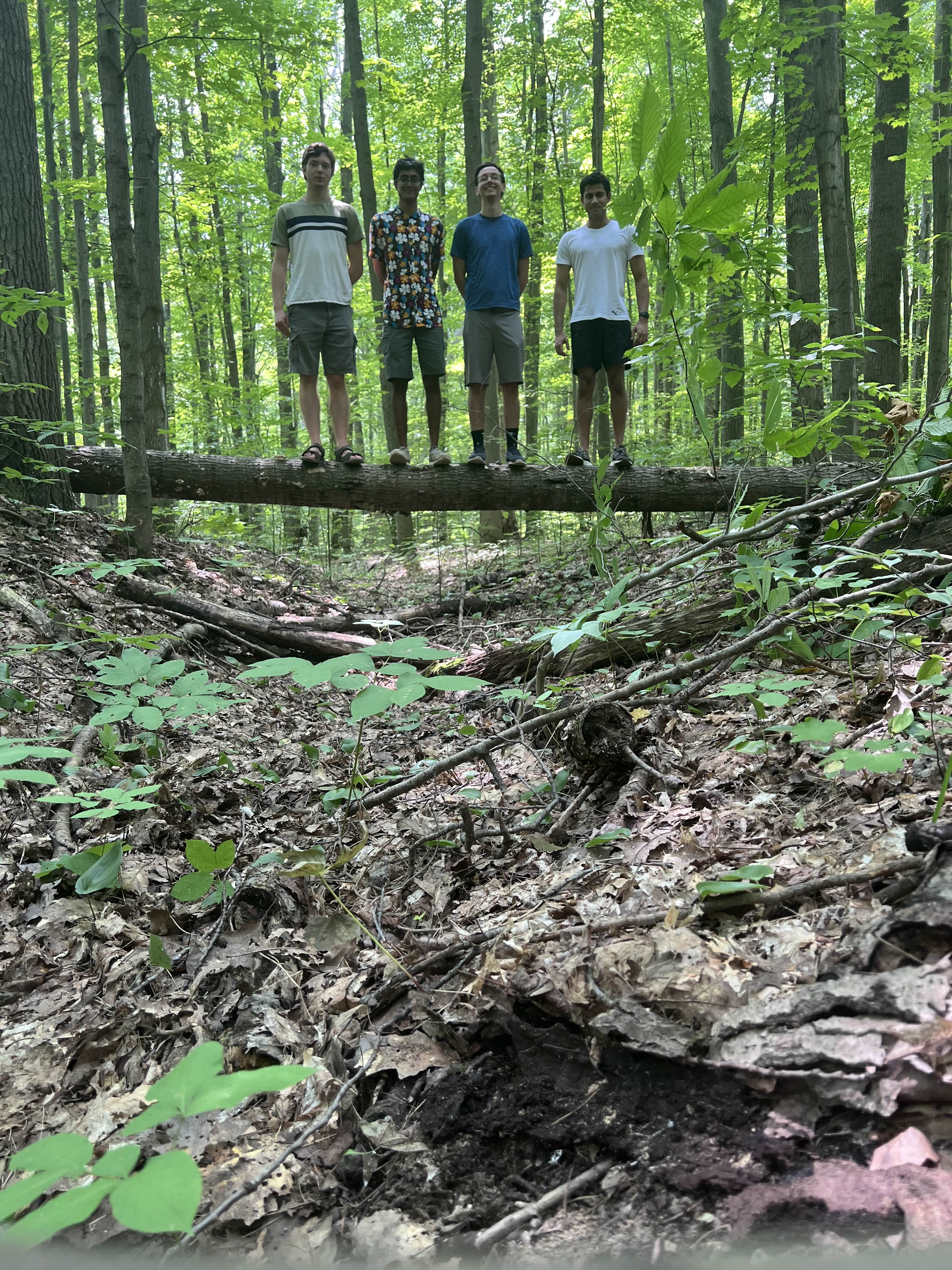
- Ditch encircling the eastern mound, 2024
- Location: Aetna Township, Missaukee County, Michigan
- Area: 2 acres (0.81 ha)
- NRHP reference No.: 73002157
- Added to NRHP: July 21, 2024

The Aetna Earthworks, also known as the Missaukee Earthworks or Missaukee Mounds, is an archaeological site consisting of a pair of circular earthworks designated 20MA11 and 20MA12 located in Aetna Township, Missaukee County, Michigan. The layout of the site is thought to represent the Midewiwin origin tale of Bear's Journey. It was listed on the National Register of Historic Places in 1973.

== Description ==
The Aetna Earthworks consists of two circular ditch-and-bank structures located atop a glacial esker and spaced 650 metres (2,130 ft) apart on an east-west line. The western structure, designated 20MA11, measures 48 metres (157 ft) in diameter, while the eastern structure, designated 20MA12, measures 53 metres (174 ft) in diameter. The eastern earthwork is both taller and wider than the western one. Each earthwork originally had two entrances, one of which roughly aligns with the other earthwork and the other of which faces roughly north-northwest.

In addition, the site includes two conical burial mounds, one north of the eastern earthwork and one south of the western earthwork, and multiple scattered storage pits. The layout of the site bears a striking resemblance to the travels described in the Midewiwin origin tale of Bear's Journey, and it is thought that the site was used for rituals connected to the story.

== History ==
The Aetna Earthworks were likely constructed around 1200 +/- 100 AD.

The land around the Aetna Earthworks was donated to the University of Michigan in 1922. Excavations were conducted by staff from the University Museum in 1925-26, and by staff from Michigan State University in 1965. Further excavations were carried out in the 2000s.
