= Clam Lake Canal =

Canal in Michigan, United States

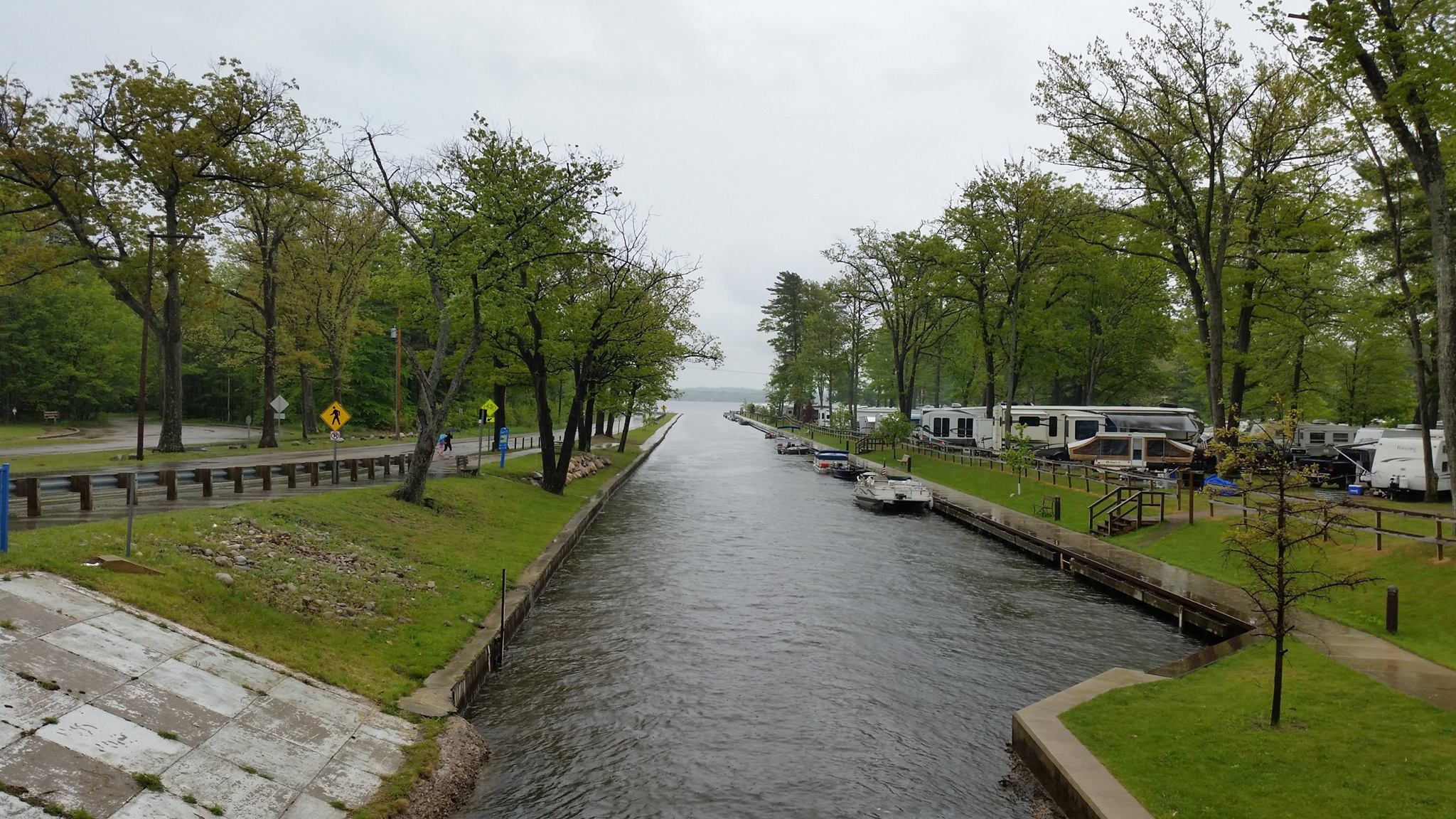
- Clam Lake Canal from M-115 (May 2017)

- Location within Michigan
- Location: Mitchell State Park; Cadillac, Michigan
- Country: United States
- Coordinates: 44°14′22″N 85°27′13″W

Specifications
- Maximum height AMSL: 1,289 ft (393 m)
- Status: Open
- Maximum width: 48 feet (14.6 m)

History
- Former names: Black Creek
- Modern name: Cadillac Canal
- Current owner: Michigan DNR
- Original owner: George A. Mitchell
- Principal engineer: Clam Lake Improvement and Construction Company
- Date completed: 1873

Geography
- Connects to: Lake Cadillac and Lake Mitchell (originally known as Big Clam Lake and Little Clam Lake)
- Depth: 2.25 feet (0.69 m)

Clam Lake Canal
- Interactive map of Clam Lake Canal

Michigan State Historic Site
- Designated: March 16, 1989

The Clam Lake Canal (sometimes called the Cadillac Canal) is a man-made canal between Lake Mitchell and Lake Cadillac in Cadillac, Michigan, made by George A. Mitchell in the 1870s. The purpose of the canal was to facilitate the movement of logs to sawmills.

The canal displays an unusual water phenomenon; it is frozen over in the first part of the winter when the lakes on each side of it are unfrozen. Then when the adjacent lakes freeze, the canal remains unfrozen.

== Background ==
Mitchell persuaded the Grand Rapids and Indiana Railroad to change their original route layout between the lakes, redirecting it to the eastern end of the Little Clam Lake, in the southeast corner of Wexford County, Michigan. Mitchell widened the stream to be able to float logs from one lake to the other and collect fees for the usage of the waterway.

== Enlargement and current use ==
The Clam Lake Canal has been widened six times over the years to about 50 ft or 15 m, and is used as a recreational passage between the lakes. The canal was dedicated as a Michigan State Historic Site on March 16, 1989.

== Freezing phenomenon ==
In the winter, Clam Lake Canal often displays an unusual phenomenon; it freezes over in the first part of the winter, when the lakes on each side are unfrozen. When the lakes freeze over in the mid-winter months, the canal thaws.

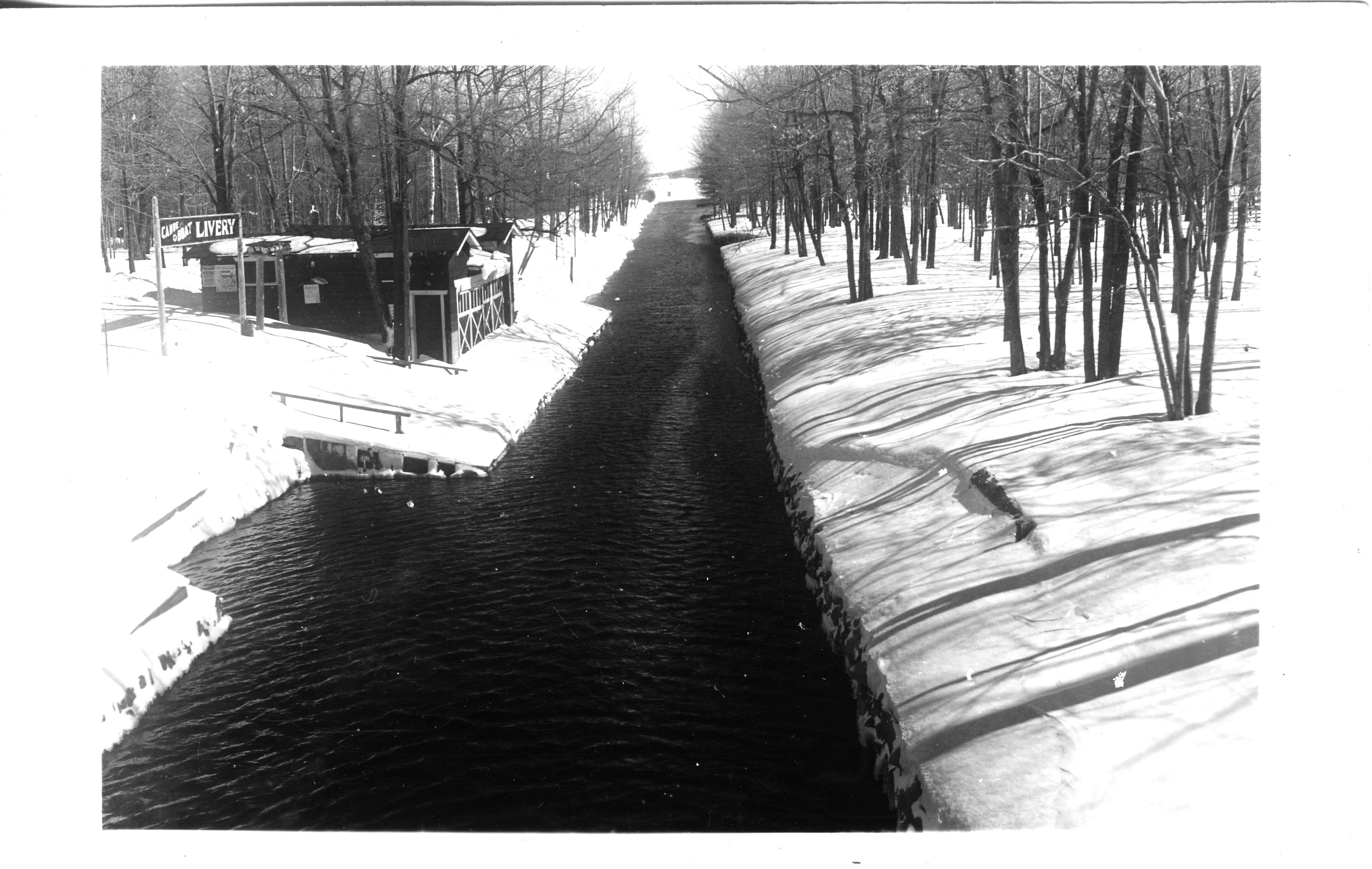
January 1890 – Clam Lake Canal unfrozen in winter months

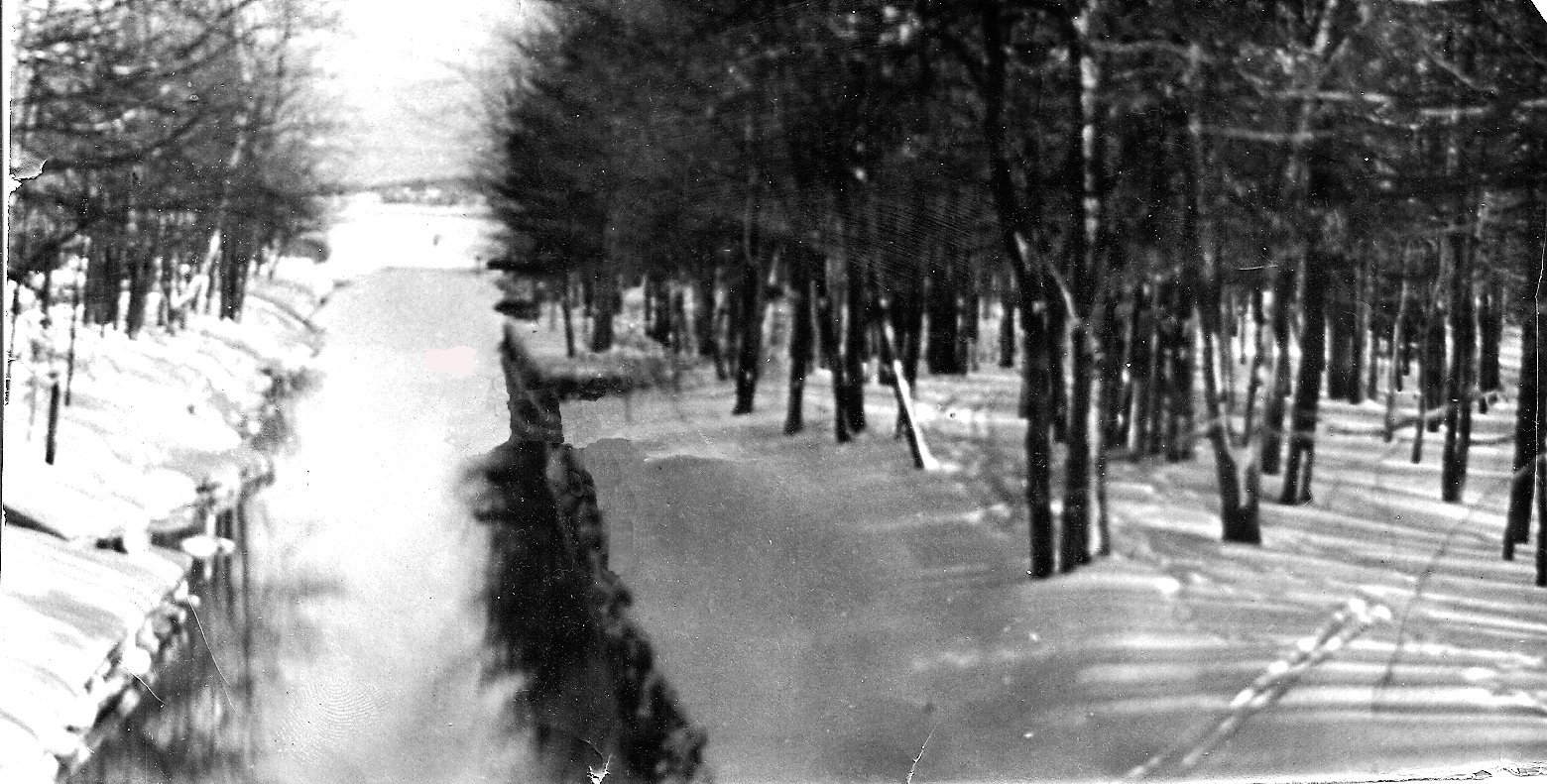
February 1900 – Clam Lake Canal unfrozen

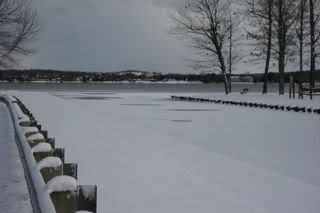
21 November 2008 – Widened Clam Lake Canal is frozen

== See also ==
- List of Michigan State Historic Sites in Wexford County

== Sources ==
- Ashlee, Laura R. (2005). Traveling Through Time / A Guide to Michigan's Historical Markers. Ann Arbor: University of Michigan Press. ISBN 0-472-03066-3.
- Forster, Matt (2018). Backroads & Byways of Michigan. Michigan: Countryman Press. ISBN 978-1581574944.
- Jager, Mark (2007). Mystic Michigan: Part One. Marion, Michigan: Zosma Publications. ISBN 978-1889043043. "Ever since the canal was constructed in the late 1880s, people have wondered why the canal freezes over when the cold weather comes, while the lakes remain unfrozen. Later, when the lakes freeze over, the canal thaws out and remains unfrozen for the rest of the winter."
