= Lake Mitchell (Michigan) =

Lake in the state of Michigan, United States

- Clam Lake
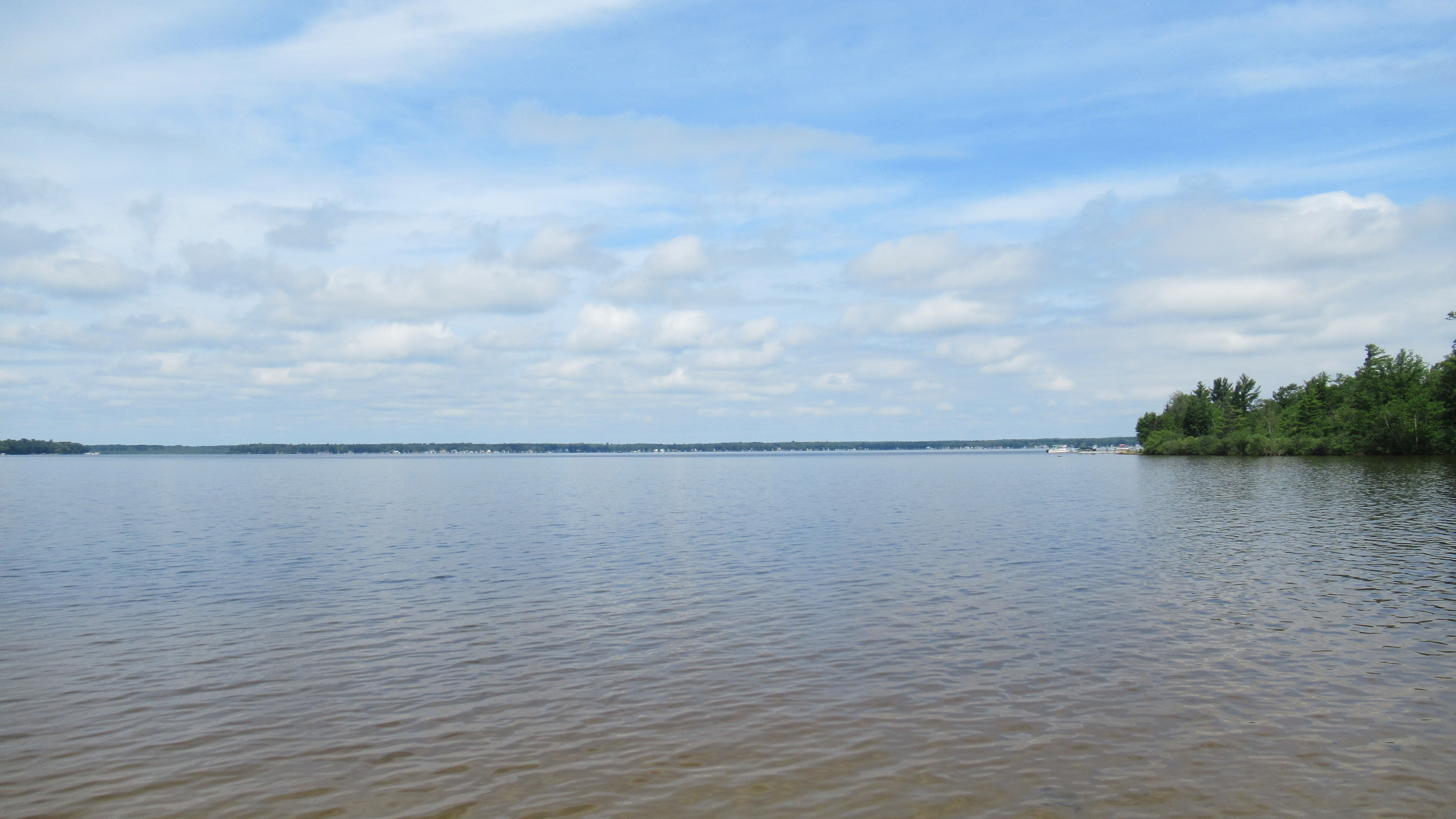
- View from Mitchell State Park

- Location within the state of Michigan
- Location: Wexford County, Michigan
- Coordinates: 44°14′52″N 085°29′36″W
- Primary inflows: Mitchell Creek
- Primary outflows: Clam Lake Canal
- Basin countries: United States
- Surface area: 2,580 acres (1,040 ha)
- Max. depth: 28 ft (8.5 m)
- Surface elevation: 1,289 ft (393 m)
- Settlements: Cadillac, Cherry Grove Township, Selma Township

Lake Mitchell is one of two lakes in Wexford County, Michigan, that are joined by the Clam Lake Canal. The other lake is Lake Cadillac.

Mitchell State Park is located on Lake Mitchell. Bluegill, Pumpkinseed Sunfish, Black Crappie, Rock Bass, Northern Pike, Walleye, Smallmouth Bass, Largemouth Bass, Bullhead are types of fish in Lake Mitchell.

== History ==
Prehistorically, the area surrounding Lake Mitchell was inhabited by the Hopewell civilization. After the Hopewell disappeared, the area became used seasonally by the Anishinaabe. The lake was the southern terminus of what is now called the Old Indian Trail, an ancient pathway that was used to connect the Cadillac area with Grand Traverse Bay at what is now Traverse City.

Historically, Lake Mitchell was referred to as Big Clam Lake, and Clam Lake is still shown in the USGS official Geographic Names Information System as a variant name for Lake Mitchell.

In 1873, local businessman George A. Mitchell founded the village of Clam Lake (renamed Cadillac, Michigan, in 1882) and constructed the canal connecting Big Clam Lake to Little Clam Lake. At the time, the canal enabled logging on the west side of Lake Mitchell; logs floated through the canal entered Lake Cadillac, on the east shore of which stood lumber mills, the railroad and the Village of Clam Lake.

The names of the two lakes were changed in 1903, with Little Clam Lake renamed as Lake Cadillac (for the community) and Big Clam Lake as Lake Mitchell, in honor of William W. Mitchell, the nephew and business partner of George A. Mitchell.

== See also ==
- List of lakes in Michigan
