= Cadillac, Michigan =

- City
- City of Cadillac
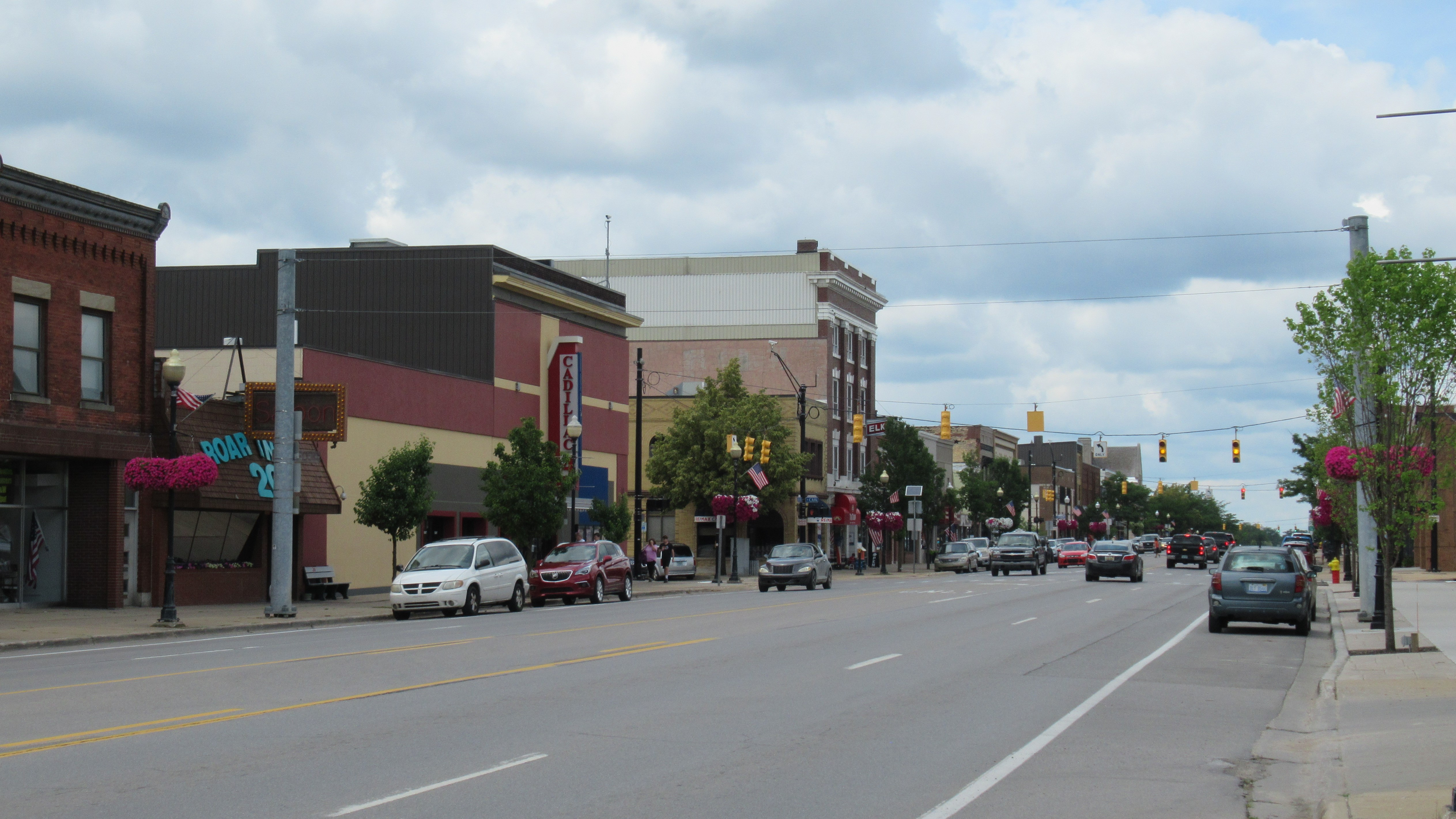
- Downtown Cadillac along N. Mitchell Street

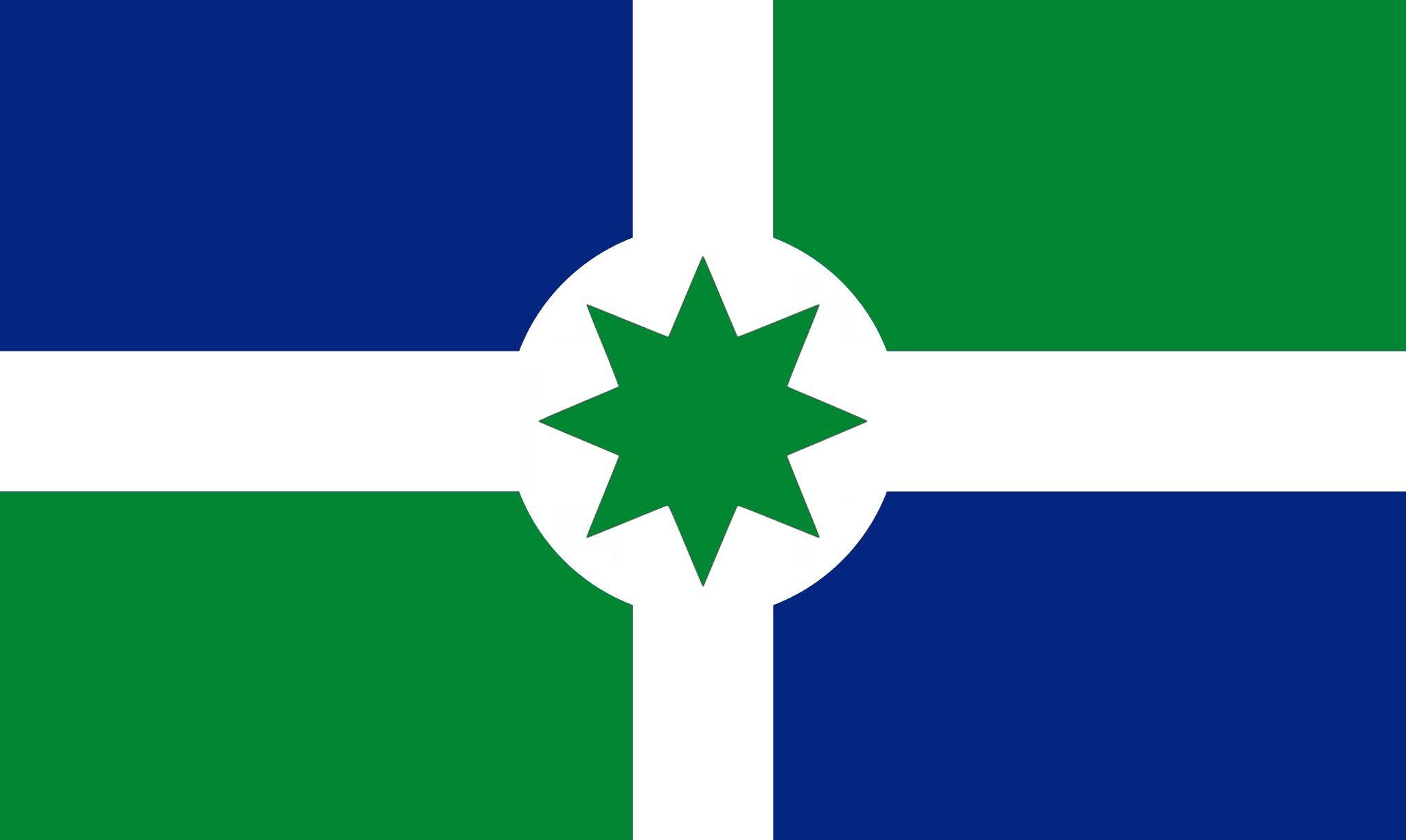
- Flag
- Nicknames: Tree City USA, City on the Lakes
- Interactive map of Cadillac, Michigan
- Coordinates: 44°15′00″N 85°24′00″W
- Country: United States
- State: Michigan
- County: Wexford
- Settled: 1871
- Platted: 1872
- Incorporated: 1875 (Clam Lake village); 1877 (city of Cadillac)

Government
  - Type: Council–manager
  - Mayor: David Powell
  - Manager: Marcus Peccia
  - Clerk: Sandra Wasson

Area
  - Total: 8.94 sq mi (23.16 km^{2})
  - Land: 7.08 sq mi (18.34 km^{2})
  - Water: 1.86 sq mi (4.82 km^{2})
- Elevation: 1,309 ft (399 m)

Population (2020)
  - Total: 10,371
  - Density: 1,464.8/sq mi (565.56/km^{2})
- Time zone: UTC−5 (Eastern (EST))
  - Summer (DST): UTC−4 (EDT)
- ZIP code(s): 49601
- Area code: 231
- FIPS code: 26-12320
- GNIS feature ID: 1619393
- Website: cadillac-mi.net

Cadillac (/ˈkædəlæk/ KAD-ə-lak) is a city in and seat of government of Wexford County in the U.S. state of Michigan. The population was 10,371 at the 2020 census, making it the second most-populated city in the Northern Michigan region, after Traverse City.

Cadillac was settled as early as 1871 and formerly known as the village of Clam Lake before incorporating as a city in 1877. The city is located upon the shores of Lake Cadillac, connected by the Clam Lake Canal to Lake Mitchell. The Clam River, which begins in Cadillac, is part of the Muskegon River watershed. Cadillac is the junction of three major highways: US Highway 131, M-55, and M-115. The geographic center of Michigan is approximately five miles (8.0 km) north-northwest of Cadillac. Cadillac is the primary city of the Cadillac micropolitan area, which includes all of Wexford County and Missaukee County to the east, and had population of 48,725 at the 2020 census.

== History ==
=== Village of Clam Lake ===
European explorers and fur traders visited this area from the 18th century, most of them initially French and French-Canadians who traded with regional Native Americans. More permanent communities were not established until the late 19th century. Initial settlements developed from logging camps and the logging industry.

In 1871, the first sawmill began operations at Clam Lake. Originally called the Pioneer Mill, it was built by John R. Yale. That same year, George A. Mitchell, a prominent local banker and railroad entrepreneur, and Adam Gallinger, a local carpenter, formed the Clam Lake Canal Improvement and Construction Company. Two years later, the Clam Lake Canal was constructed between Big and Little Clam lakes, known as present-day Lakes Mitchell and Lake Cadillac. Sawmill owners used the canal to transport timber from Big Clam Lake to the mills and railroad sites on Little Clam Lake. The Grand Rapids and Indiana Railroad (G.R. & I. Railroad) had reached the area in 1872.

The settlement of Clam Lake was incorporated as a village in 1874. George Mitchell was elected as the first mayor. The village was incorporated as a city in 1877 and renamed Cadillac, after Antoine Laumet de La Mothe, sieur de Cadillac, a French colonist who started the first permanent settlement at Detroit in 1701.

=== Battle of Manton ===
The Wexford County seat of government, originally located in Sherman, was moved to Manton in 1881, as the result of a compromise between the feuding residents of Cadillac and Sherman. Cadillac partisans, however, won the county seat by a county-wide vote in April 1882. The day following the election, a sheriff's posse left the Cadillac for Manton by special train to seize the county records. After they arrived and collected a portion of the materials, however, an angry crowd confronted the Cadillac men and drove them out of town.

When the sheriff returned to Cadillac, he encountered a force consisting of several hundred armed men; this group reportedly included a brass band. The Sheriff's force, some of whom may have been intoxicated, traveled back to Manton to seize the remaining records. Although Manton residents confronted the Cadillac men and barricaded the courthouse, the posse successfully seized the documents. They returned to Cadillac in dubious glory.

=== City of Cadillac ===
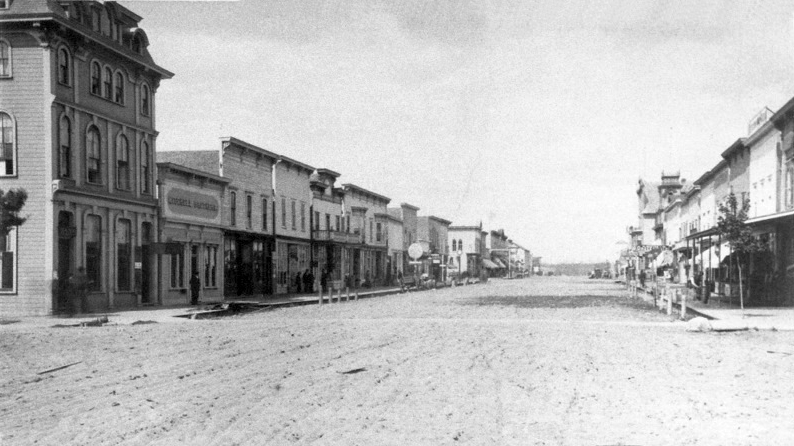
Mitchell Street in Cadillac, circa 1880s

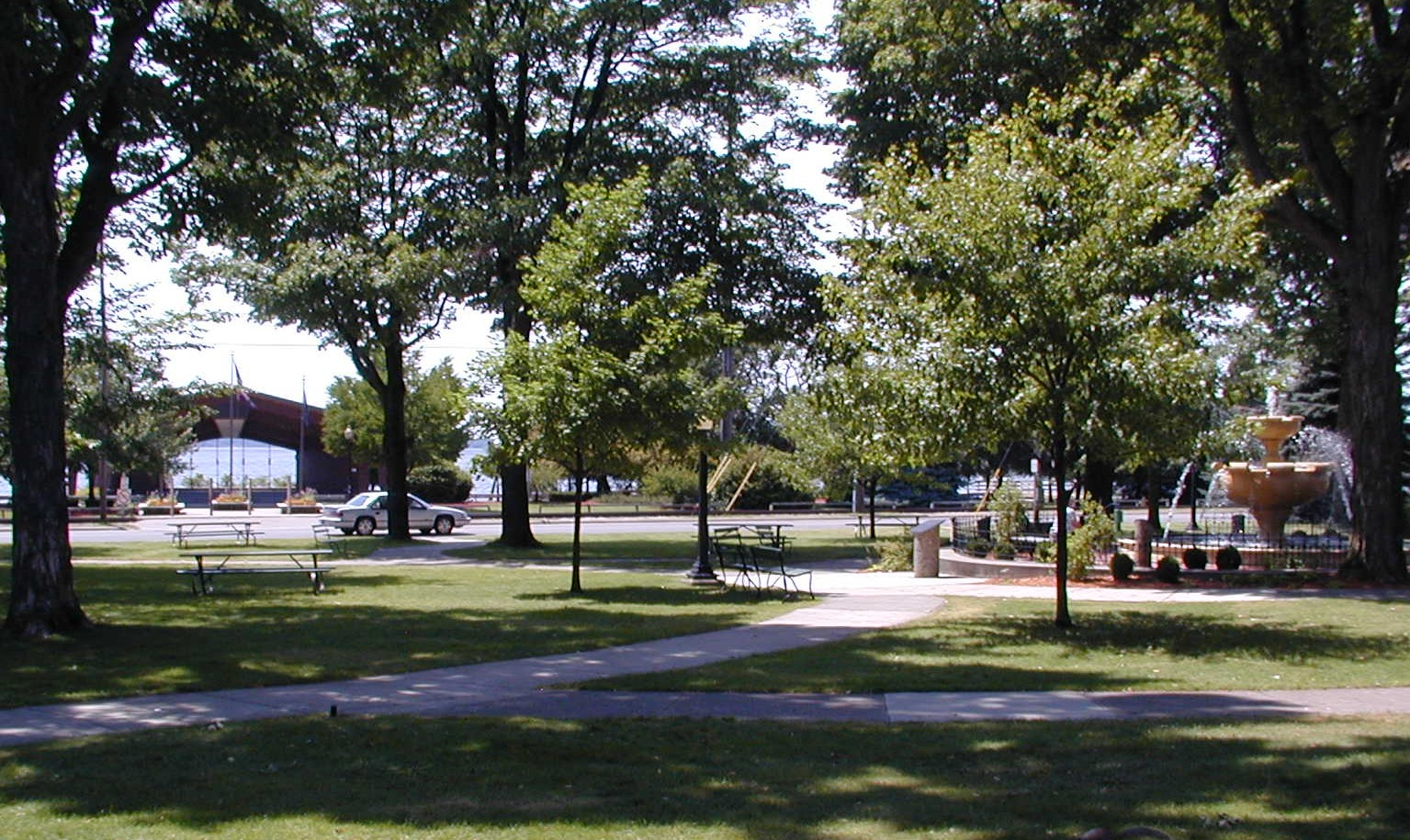
The City Park, featuring the Kris Eggle Memorial Fountain and the Rotary Pavilion

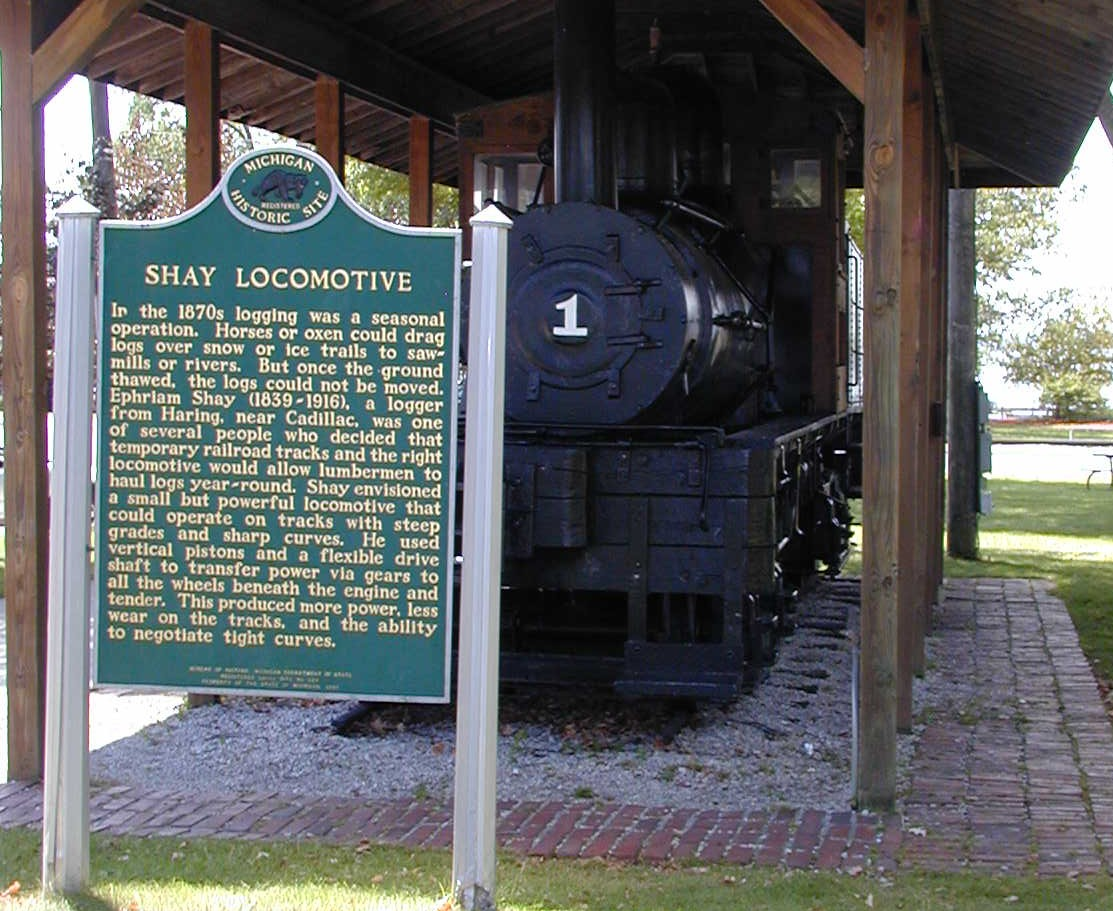
The Shay Locomotive

In 1878, Ephraim Shay perfected his Shay locomotive, which was particularly effective in its ability to climb steep grades, maneuver sharp turns, and accommodate imperfections in railroad tracks. Cadillac was home to the Michigan Iron Works Company, which manufactured the Shay locomotive for a short time in the early 1880s. The lumber industry continued to dominate the city, attracting a large immigrant labor force, most of whom were Swedish. (Later, Cadillac made sister city arrangements with Mölnlycke, Sweden, and Rovaniemi, Finland).

In 1899, the Cadillac Club formed, the forerunner of the Cadillac Area Chamber of Commerce.

By the early 20th century, with the lumber depleted, the timber industry was in decline. Today, manufacturers employ 30% of residents. Cadillac's range of industries includes the manufacture of pleasure boats, automotive parts, water-well components, vacuum cleaners, and rubber products.

In 1936, the U.S. Forest Service and the Civilian Conservation Corps developed the Caberfae Ski Area during the Great Depression as an investment in future economic development. This resulted in promotion of this area as a tourist center. Caberfae remains in operation today, as the oldest ski resort in the midwest. Tourism and outdoor recreation have since become an important sector of Cadillac's economy.

In the summer, tourists travel to the city and region for boating, fishing, hiking, mountain biking, and camping. During the fall, hunting and color tours are popular. The winter is possibly the busiest season; the area can be found packed with downhill skiers, cross-country skiers, ice-fishers, snow-shoers and–most of all–snowmobilers. The North American Snowmobile Festival (NASF) is held on frozen Lake Cadillac every winter.

Thirsty's, a gas station on M-55 west of Cadillac, was the home of Samantha or "Sam The Bear" from the 1970s through the late 1990s, when Sam died of old age. Sam was the only brown bear in captivity in the US at the time to hibernate naturally. Sam lived in a large cage in front of the gas station and was fed ice cream cones by tourists every summer.

In October 1975 the rock group Kiss visited Cadillac and performed at the Cadillac High School gymnasium. They played the concert to honor the Cadillac High School football team. In previous years, the team had compiled a record of sixteen consecutive victories, but the 1974 squad opened the season with two losses. The assistant coach, Jim Neff, an English teacher and rock'n'roll fan, thought to inspire the team by playing Kiss music in the locker room. He also connected the team's game plan, K-I-S-S or "Keep It Simple Stupid", with the band. The team went on to win seven straight games and their conference co-championship. After learning of their association with the team's success, the band decided to visit the school and play for the homecoming game.

== Geography ==
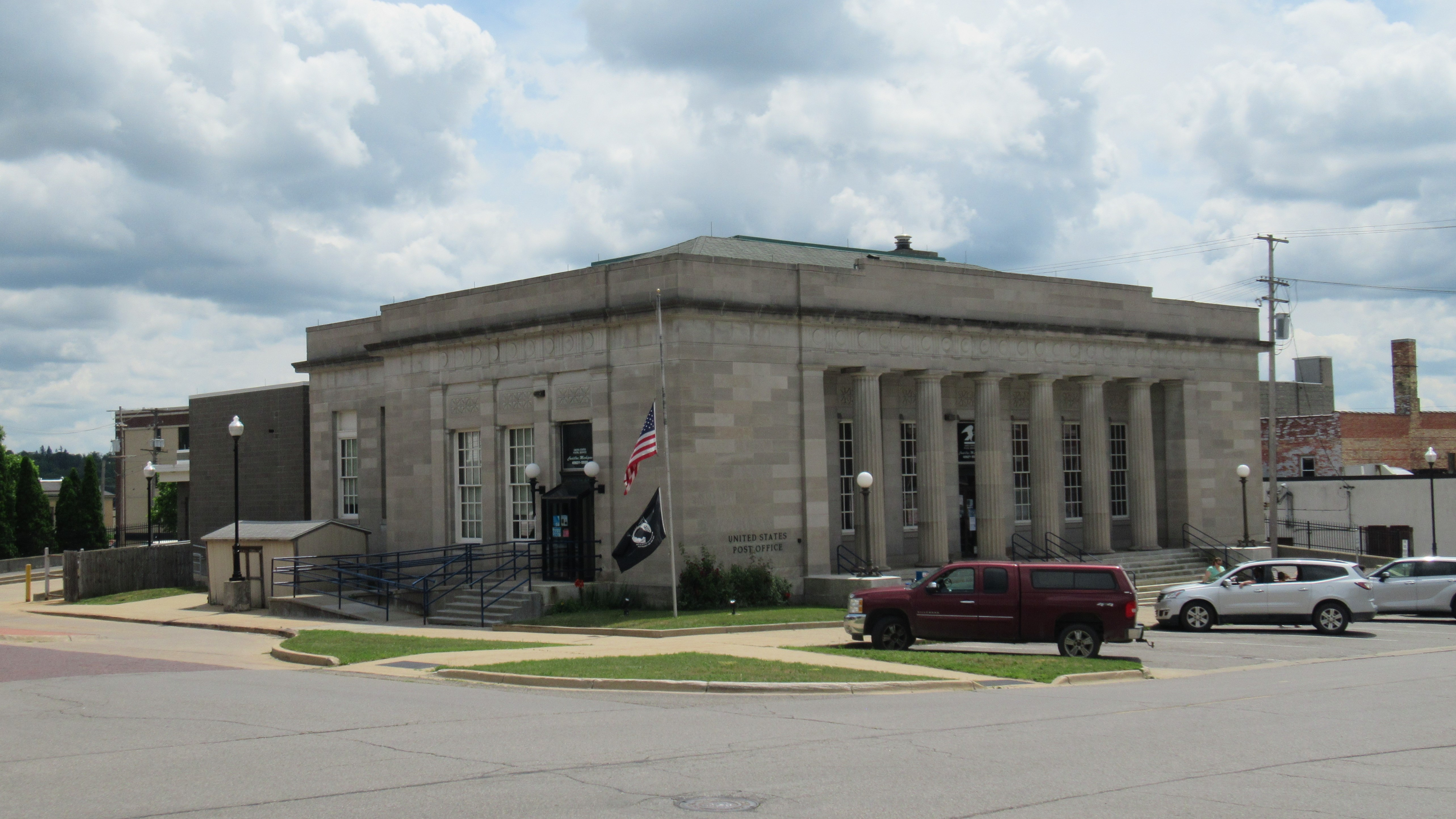
U.S. Post Office in Cadillac

=== Topography ===
According to the U.S. Census Bureau, the city has a total area of 9.02 square miles (23.36 km^{2}), of which 7.16 square miles (18.54 km^{2}) is land and 1.86 square miles (4.82 km^{2}) is water.

The 1,150-acre (5 km^{2}) Lake Cadillac is entirely within the city limits. The larger, 2,580-acre (10 km^{2}) Lake Mitchell is nearby on the west side of the city, with 1,760 feet (540 m) of shoreline within the city's municipal boundary. The lakes were connected by a stream which was replaced in 1873 by the Clam Lake Canal. The canal was featured on Ripley's Believe It or Not in the 1970s due to the phenomenon that in winter the canal freezes before the lakes and then after the lakes freeze, the canal thaws and remains unfrozen for the rest of the winter.

Cadillac is located at the eastern edge of what is now managed as the Manistee National Forest. The surrounding area is heavily wooded, with mixed hardwood and conifer forests. Christmas tree farming has been important to the area agricultural industry. Cadillac was chosen in 1988 to donate the holiday tree installed at the lawn of the U.S. Capitol building in Washington, D.C.

The area surrounding Cadillac is primarily rural, and is considered to be part of Northern Michigan. Given the small size of nearby communities, the city is a major commercial and industrial hub of the region.

=== Cityscape ===
The commercial center of the city is located on the eastern edge of Lake Cadillac. Most downtown buildings range from two to five stories in height. Many face Mitchell Street, the city's tree-lined main street and traditional corridor of travel through town. The downtown contains a movie theater, gift shops, restaurants, a bookstore, specialty food stores, jewelers, clothing retailers, and various other businesses.

The Courthouse Hill Historic District, recognized in April 2005, lies adjacent to the city's commercial center. The District contains a number of large Victorian-style residences built by the lumber barons and businessmen who helped develop the city in the 1870s. Population and building density is highest in this area.

On the western bank of Lake Cadillac, where M-55 intersects M-115, is what is locally referred to as Cadillac West. This is a small commercial district, bordering Mitchell State Park and the two lakes; it caters mostly to tourists. It contains a number of motels and restaurants.

Along the northern and southern stretches of the lake are the main residential areas of the city. They are generally of low to moderate density, characterized primarily by single-family structures.

=== Climate ===
Cadillac experiences a typical northern Michigan climate, undergoing temperate seasonal changes, influenced by the presence of Lake Michigan and the inevitable lake effect. Winters are generally cold with large amounts of snowfall. Summers are warm. The average high temperature in July is 80 °F (27 °C) and the average low in January is 12 °F (−11 °C). Summer temperatures can exceed 90 °F (32 °C), and winter temperatures can drop below 0 °F (−18 °C). Average annual rainfall is 30 inches (76 cm), and average annual snowfall is 81 inches (210 cm) . Snowfall typically occurs between the months of November and March. According to the Köppen climate classification system, Cadillac has a humid continental climate, abbreviated "Dfb" on climate maps.

Climate data for Cadillac, Michigan (1991–2020 normals, extremes 1909–present)
Month	Jan	Feb	Mar	Apr	May	Jun	Jul	Aug	Sep	Oct	Nov	Dec	Year
Record high °F (°C)	59 (15)	68 (20)	85 (29)	86 (30)	92 (33)	98 (37)	104 (40)	99 (37)	96 (36)	86 (30)	74 (23)	64 (18)	104 (40)
Mean maximum °F (°C)	45.4 (7.4)	48.6 (9.2)	61.7 (16.5)	74.8 (23.8)	83.9 (28.8)	89.6 (32.0)	90.1 (32.3)	88.3 (31.3)	85.2 (29.6)	75.4 (24.1)	61.7 (16.5)	49.5 (9.7)	92.5 (33.6)
Mean daily maximum °F (°C)	26.8 (−2.9)	29.7 (−1.3)	39.7 (4.3)	52.7 (11.5)	66.0 (18.9)	75.9 (24.4)	79.8 (26.6)	77.7 (25.4)	70.3 (21.3)	56.3 (13.5)	42.9 (6.1)	32.1 (0.1)	54.2 (12.3)
Daily mean °F (°C)	19.5 (−6.9)	21.1 (−6.1)	29.6 (−1.3)	41.8 (5.4)	54.4 (12.4)	64.6 (18.1)	68.6 (20.3)	66.6 (19.2)	59.0 (15.0)	46.8 (8.2)	35.5 (1.9)	25.9 (−3.4)	44.5 (6.9)
Mean daily minimum °F (°C)	12.2 (−11.0)	12.5 (−10.8)	19.5 (−6.9)	30.9 (−0.6)	42.8 (6.0)	53.3 (11.8)	57.5 (14.2)	55.4 (13.0)	47.7 (8.7)	37.4 (3.0)	28.2 (−2.1)	19.7 (−6.8)	34.8 (1.6)
Mean minimum °F (°C)	−9.7 (−23.2)	−10.2 (−23.4)	−4.0 (−20.0)	15.4 (−9.2)	26.5 (−3.1)	36.9 (2.7)	43.1 (6.2)	41.5 (5.3)	32.2 (0.1)	23.6 (−4.7)	11.6 (−11.3)	−0.5 (−18.1)	−15.1 (−26.2)
Record low °F (°C)	−43 (−42)	−36 (−38)	−39 (−39)	−12 (−24)	14 (−10)	18 (−8)	31 (−1)	26 (−3)	19 (−7)	10 (−12)	−16 (−27)	−25 (−32)	−43 (−42)
Average precipitation inches (mm)	2.05 (52)	1.53 (39)	2.06 (52)	3.56 (90)	3.63 (92)	3.61 (92)	3.46 (88)	3.50 (89)	3.16 (80)	3.86 (98)	2.72 (69)	2.02 (51)	35.16 (893)
Average precipitation days (≥ 0.01 in)	18.2	13.2	11.1	13.4	13.4	11.7	10.9	11.5	12.4	15.7	14.9	15.9	162.3
Source: NOAA

=== Superfund sites ===
Cadillac has two superfund sites, according to the U.S. Environmental Protection Agency. One is located at 1100 Wright Street, the former site of Kysor Industrial Corp, which operations resulted in toxic wastes. The other is located at 1002 6th Street, the former site of Northernaire Plating. Its operations also produced hazardous wastes, which produced contamination.

== Demographics ==
Historical population
Census	Pop.	Note	%±
1880	2,213		—
1890	4,461		101.6%
1900	5,997		34.4%
1910	8,375		39.7%
1920	9,750		16.4%
1930	9,570		−1.8%
1940	9,855		3.0%
1950	10,425		5.8%
1960	10,112		−3.0%
1970	9,990		−1.2%
1980	10,199		2.1%
1990	10,104		−0.9%
2000	10,000		−1.0%
2010	10,355		3.6%
2020	10,371		0.2%
U.S. Decennial Census

=== 2020 census ===
As of the 2020 census, Cadillac had a population of 10,371. The median age was 38.3 years. 23.8% of residents were under the age of 18 and 19.4% of residents were 65 years of age or older. For every 100 females there were 90.7 males, and for every 100 females age 18 and over there were 87.4 males age 18 and over.

98.5% of residents lived in urban areas, while 1.5% lived in rural areas.

There were 4,439 households in Cadillac, of which 27.5% had children under the age of 18 living in them. Of all households, 33.6% were married-couple households, 20.6% were households with a male householder and no spouse or partner present, and 36.1% were households with a female householder and no spouse or partner present. About 35.9% of all households were made up of individuals and 16.2% had someone living alone who was 65 years of age or older.

There were 4,956 housing units, of which 10.4% were vacant. The homeowner vacancy rate was 2.1% and the rental vacancy rate was 6.8%.

Racial composition as of the 2020 census
Race	Number	Percent
White	9,477	91.4%
Black or African American	100	1.0%
American Indian and Alaska Native	55	0.5%
Asian	80	0.8%
Native Hawaiian and Other Pacific Islander	0	0.0%
Some other race	105	1.0%
Two or more races	554	5.3%
Hispanic or Latino (of any race)	306	3.0%

=== 2010 census ===
As of the census of 2010, there were 10,355 people, 4,280 households, and 2,625 families residing in the city. The population density was 1,446.2 inhabitants per square mile (558.4/km^{2}). There were 4,927 housing units at an average density of 688.1 per square mile (265.7/km^{2}). The racial makeup of the city was 95.6% White, 0.5% African American, 0.6% Native American, 1.0% Asian, 0.4% from other races, and 1.8% from two or more races. Hispanic or Latino residents of any race were 1.8% of the population.

There were 4,280 households, of which 32.9% had children under the age of 18 living with them, 39.2% were married couples living together, 16.4% had a female householder with no husband present, 5.7% had a male householder with no wife present, and 38.7% were non-families. 32.0% of all households were made up of individuals, and 14% had someone living alone who was 65 years of age or older. The average household size was 2.34 and the average family size was 2.90.

The median age in the city was 36.5 years. 24.7% of residents were under the age of 18; 10% were between the ages of 18 and 24; 24.4% were from 25 to 44; 23.8% were from 45 to 64; and 17.1% were 65 years of age or older. The gender makeup of the city was 47.4% male and 52.6% female.

=== 2000 census ===
As of the census of 2000, there were 10,000 people, 4,118 households, and 2,577 families residing in the city. The population density was 1,466.0 inhabitants per square mile (566.0/km^{2}). There were 4,466 housing units at an average density of 654.7 per square mile (252.8/km^{2}). The racial makeup of the city was 96.55% White, 0.21% Black or African American, 0.92% Native American, 0.63% Asian, 0.03% Pacific Islander, 0.28% from other races, and 1.38% from two or more races. 1.18% of the population was Hispanic or Latino of any race.

There were 4,118 households, out of which 32.2% had children under the age of 18 living with them, 43.9% were married couples living together, 14.2% had a female householder with no husband present, and 37.4% were non-families. 31.8% of all households were made up of individuals, and 14.4% had someone living alone who was 65 years of age or older. The average household size was 2.37 and the average family size was 2.96.

In the city, 26.2% of the population was under the age of 18, 9.6% was from 18 to 24, 27.9% from 25 to 44, 19.6% from 45 to 64, and 16.7% was 65 years of age or older. The median age was 36 years. For every 100 females, there were 91.4 males. For every 100 females age 18 and over, there were 84.4 males.

The median income for a household in the city was $29,899, and the median income for a family was $36,825. Males had a median income of $29,773 versus $21,283 for females. The per capita income for the city was $16,801. About 10.9% of families and 13.7% of the population were below the poverty line, including 15.4% of those under age 18 and 13.3% of those age 65 or over.

== Economy ==
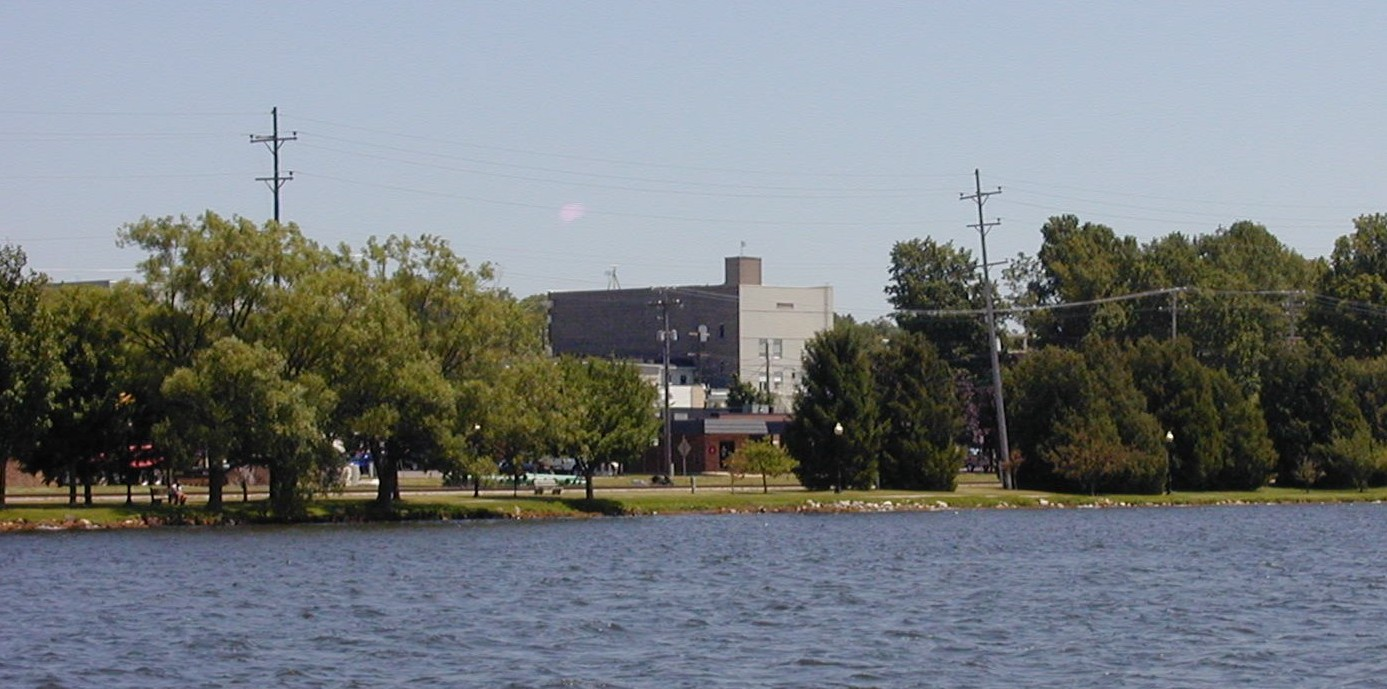
Downtown Cadillac

Manufacturing has been the greatest employer in Cadillac since the logging industry. More than 26% of the city's labor force is employed in manufacturing. Three industrial parks are located within the city limits, comprising 7% of the total land use in Cadillac. Their operations generate 47% of the city's tax base. Much of the city's economic performance is determined by the fortunes of local industry.

The center of the city is generally perceived to have a "small-town-feel". In the summer, the downtown fills with tourists, many from southern Michigan. The city center is one block from Lake Cadillac. For visitors by boat who dock at the public docks, it is nearly as accessible by boat as it is by car. The city's immediate proximity to two lakes, as well as Manistee National Forest, Pere Marquette State Forest, Mitchell State Park and a number of major highways, has established tourism as a significant sector of the local economy.

During the winter months, Lake Cadillac and Lake Mitchell freeze over and the city becomes covered with snow. Cadillac is connected to a number of trail systems popular with winter recreation enthusiasts. The city integrates unusually well into the corridors of travel created by snowmobilers.

Cadillac is also known as Chestnut Town, USA. The local area has a relatively high number of American chestnut trees, planted by pioneers from New York and Pennsylvania who settled in western Michigan. A blight in the early 20th century killed nearly every American Chestnut tree, but those in western Michigan had developed a mysterious resistance and survived.

=== Top employers ===
According to the city's 2019 Comprehensive Annual Financial Report, the principal employers in the city were:

Employer	# of employees (2019)
Avon Automotive	500–999
Cadillac Area Public Schools	500–999
Four Winn's/Glastron/Wellcraft/Rec Boat	500–999
Avon Protection Systems	250–499
Cadillac Casting	250–499
Munson Healthcare Cadillac Hospital	250–499
Rexair	250–499
AAR Mobility Systems	100–249
Michigan Rubber Products	100–249
Fiamm Technologies	100–249

== Arts and culture ==
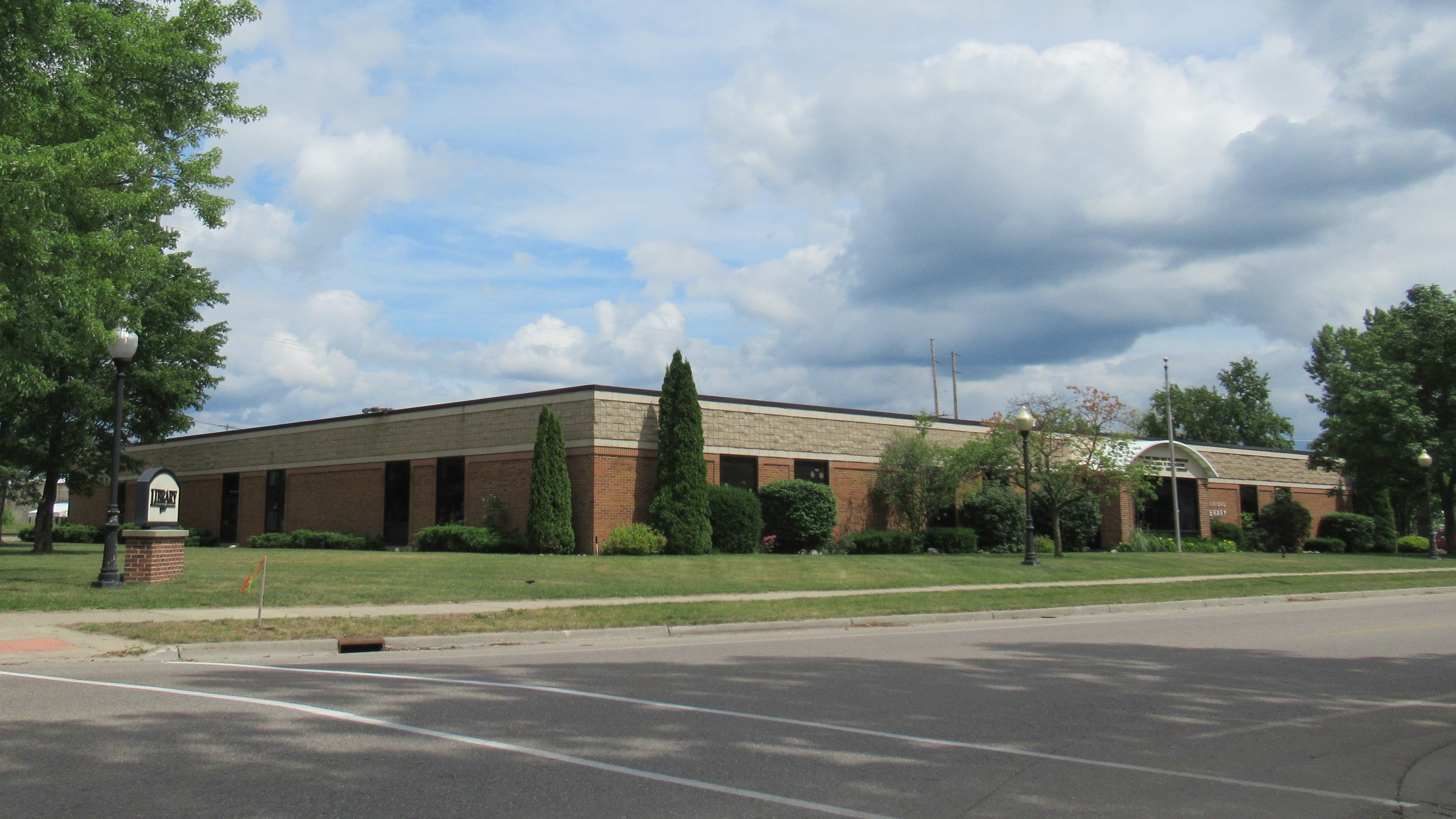
Cadillac Wexford Public Library

Sites in Cadillac with Michigan historical markers include: Cadillac Carnegie Library, Charles T. Mitchell House, Clam Lake Canal, Cobbs and Mitchell Building, Cobbs and Mitchell No. 1, and the Shay Locomotive.

== Government ==
Cadillac was incorporated as a city in 1877. It is a home rule city with a Council-Manager form of government-one.

Current council members are Antoinette Schippers (Mayor), Bryan Ellenbaas (Ward 1 councilmember), Scott Hopkins (Ward 2 Councilmember), Robert Engles (Ward 3 Councilmember), and Ruthann French (Ward 4 Councilmember). Antoinette Schippers has been serving as acting mayor since February 12, 2025, following Carla Filkins resignation. The present City Manager is Marcus Peccia.

Cadillac is located in Michigan's 2nd congressional district, represented by Republican John Moolenaar, and also Michigan’s 36th senate district, represented by Michelle Hoitenga.

== Education ==
Cadillac's public education system has a total of 10 schools, with approximately 3,100 students and 166 teachers with a student:teacher ratio of 19.1:1. Cadillac has 4 private primary and secondary schools with approximately 394 students, 20 teachers and a student:teacher ratio of 20:1.

=== Cadillac Area Public Schools ===
Public education is administered by Cadillac Area Public Schools. The city has two high schools: Cadillac High School and Innovation High School. The area also has a middle school, Mackinaw Trail Middle School (MTMS), covering grades 6, 7 and 8. There are three elementary schools, Forest View Elementary, Franklin Elementary, and Lincoln Elementary. There is one early childhood center, Viking Learning Center. Cadillac Area Public Schools is under the leadership of superintendent Jennifer Brown. Brown was also head of the recent bond that passed in 2017, where construction on all pre-k through 12th grade buildings was completed in 2024. Cadillac also has an alternative high school at the Innovation High School located across the street from the main high school campus and district administration.

=== Private schools ===
Cadillac Heritage Christian offers nondenominational Christian education from pre-K through 12th grade.

Northview Adventist School has 16 students in grades 1–10 as of 2020.

St. Ann School is a coed private Roman Catholic school with 236 students in grades pre-K through 7.

=== Training schools ===
Northwoods Aviation, located at Wexford County Airport, offers training programs for piloting and servicing aircraft.

The Cadillac Institute of Cosmetology is a full service teaching salon in downtown Cadillac that offers training for general cosmetologists and specialized technicians to high school students through a partnership with Wexford-Missaukee Intermediate School District.

=== Colleges ===
The Baker College-Cadillac campus occupies 66 acres (270,000 m^{2}) just outside the City of Cadillac. The school has an enrollment of more than 1,300 students and offers Associate's and bachelor's degrees, in addition to professional certifications.

== Media ==
=== Newspapers ===
- The Cadillac News

=== Radio ===
- WATT (1240 am) – news and talk
- WLJW (1370 am) – religious
- WOLW (91.1 FM) – religious "Northern Christian Radio"
- WGCP (91.9 FM) – religious Strong Tower Radio
- WJZQ (92.9 FM) – Top 40 "Z-93"
- WKAD (93.7 FM) – "The Ticket" (Fox Sports Radio)
- WLXV (96.7 FM) – 96.7 The Bull
- WAIR (104.9 FM) – contemporary Christian "Smile-FM"
- WCKC (107.1 FM) – classic rock "The Drive"
- WCDY (107.9 FM) – hot AC "107.9 CDY"

=== Television ===
- WWTV (Channel 9) – CBS, branded as "9 &10 News"
- WMNN (Channel 26) – ShopHQ (was the flagship station of national news network NewsNet from 2019 to 2024)
- WCMV (Channel 27) – PBS, satellite of WCMU in Mount Pleasant, Michigan
- WFQX (Channel 32) – Fox, branded as "Local 32"
- WFQX-DT2 (Channel 32.2) - The CW Plus, branded as "The CW Northern Michigan"
- W23EB-D (Channel 23.1-23.7) - 3ABN, Amazing Facts TV, Strong Tower Radio

Additionally, Cadillac is served by Traverse City stations WPBN-TV (Channel 7, NBC) and WGTU (Channel 29, ABC).

== Infrastructure ==
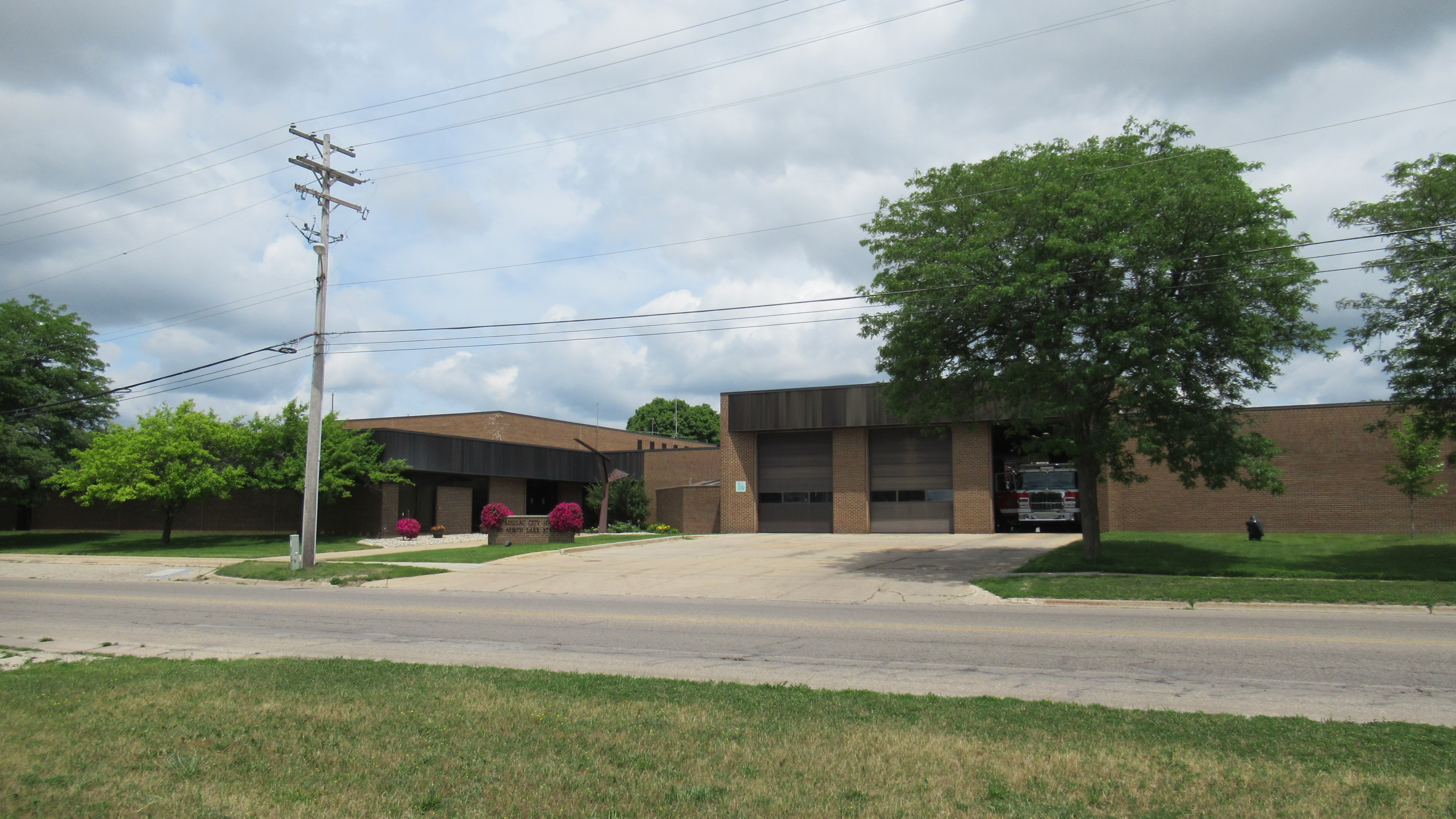
Cadillac City Hall and Fire Department

=== Transportation ===
==== Major highways ====
Cadillac is situated as the confluence of three highways: US 131, M-55 and M-115. Prior to 2001, the northern end of the freeway portion of US 131 was located at the southern entrance to Cadillac. With the construction of a bypass, the US 131 freeway was extended around the east side of the city. The former route of the highway through downtown Cadillac was redesignated as BUS US 131. In the city, BUS US 131 is named Mitchell Street, after George Mitchell, but may be referred to as main street.

- US 131 bypasses the city to the east. The freeway continues southerly toward Big Rapids and Grand Rapids and northerly toward Manton before transitioning to a two-lane highway for the remainder of the distance to Petoskey.
- Bus. US 131, a loop route through downtown, running largely along the former route of US 131 through the city.
- M-55 is a major two-lane east–west route across the state, connecting with Manistee on the west and Lake City, Houghton Lake, West Branch, and Tawas City on the east.
- M-115, another major two-lane route, runs diagonally from Clare to the southeast to Frankfort to the northwest.

==== Rail ====
The city is serviced by rail via the Great Lakes Central Railroad. This is primarily a freight line, although passenger service is expected in the future.

==== Public transit ====
- Cadillac and Wexford County jointly operate a local public bus service. The Wexford Transit Authority is a demand-response, public transportation system, and has been in operation since 1974.
- Indian Trails provides daily intercity bus service between Grand Rapids and St. Ignace and stops in Cadillac.

==== Non-motorized transportation ====
The White Pine Trail's northern terminus is in Cadillac. The trail, which stretches 92 miles (148 km) and originates from Comstock Park, follows an abandoned railroad bed into the center of the city. The trail is paved from the village of Leroy 16 miles north to Cadillac.

== Notable people ==
- Jim Bowman, NFL player
- Jan Harold Brunvand, American folklorist, born in Cadillac
- Jennifer Campbell (actress), graduated from Cadillac High School in 1986
- Larry Joe Campbell, actor (According to Jim); born in Cadillac
- Paul McMullen, middle-distance runner; grew up in Cadillac
- George A. Mitchell, father of the city of Cadillac (first developer)
- Gregory Powell, convicted murderer whose crime was detailed in The Onion Field by Joseph Wambaugh
- Jackie Swanson, actress (Cheers), attended high school in Cadillac
- Thomas Jones Thorp, Union Army officer, practiced law in Cadillac
- Guy Vander Jagt, U.S. congressman from Michigan's 9th congressional district; born in Cadillac
- Luke Winslow-King, musician; born in Cadillac
- Ad Wolgast, professional boxer; born in Cadillac
