= Wexford Township, Michigan =

- Civil township
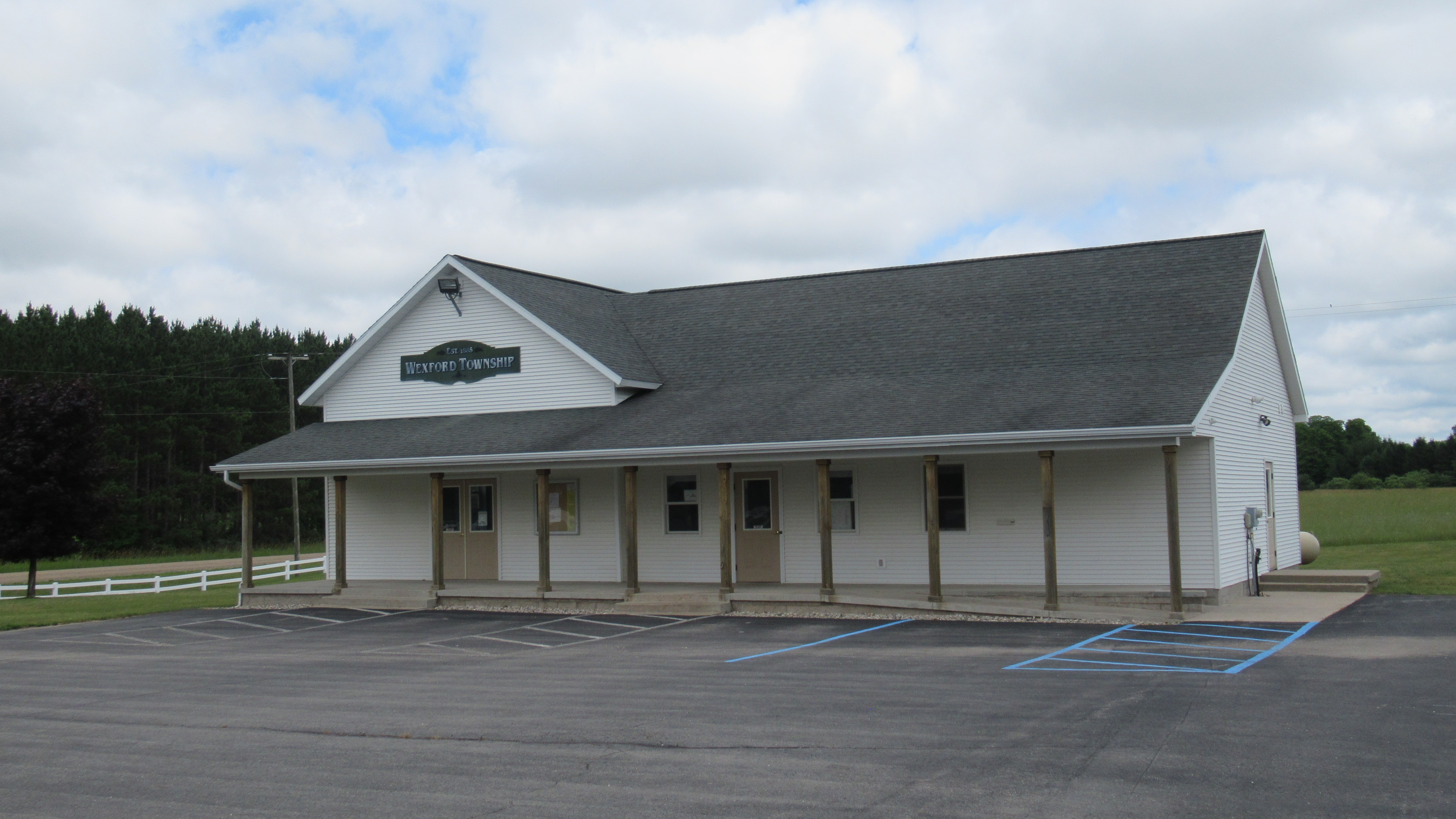
- Wexford Township Hall

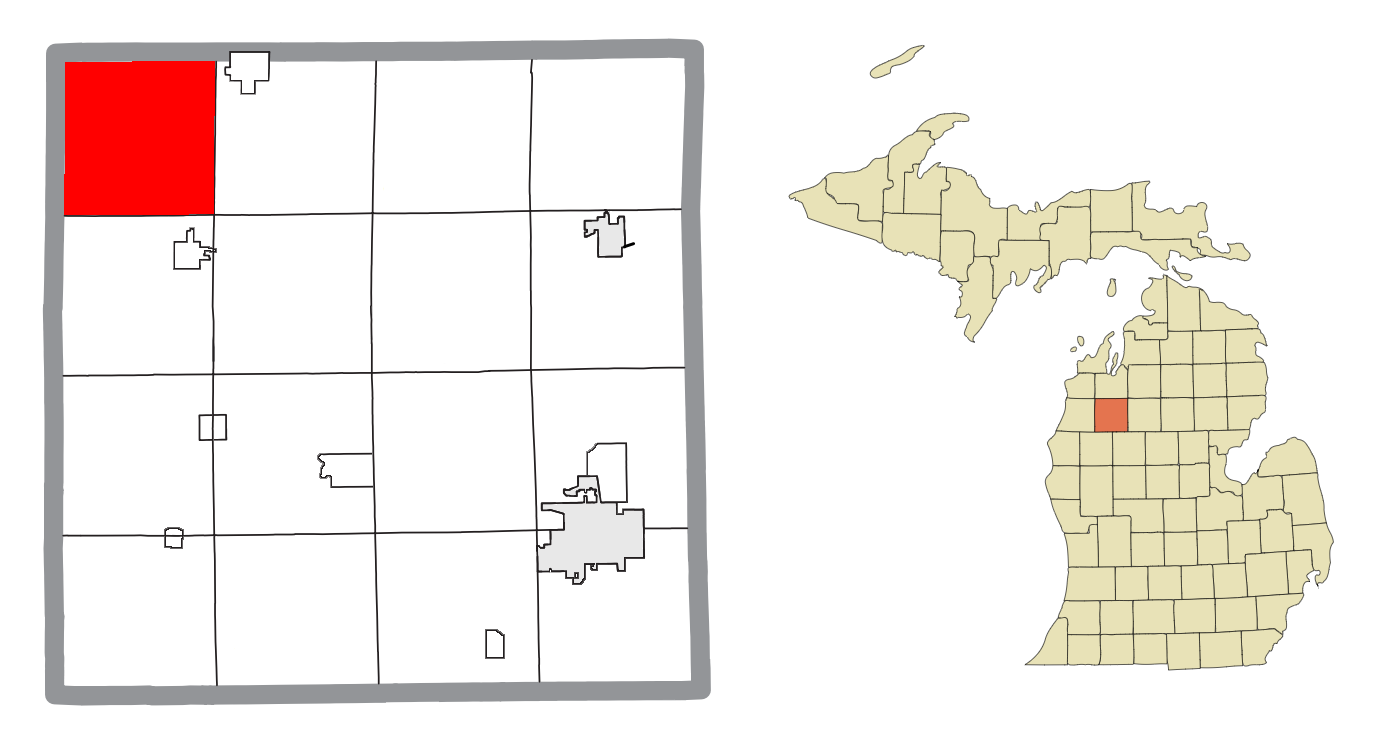
- Location within Wexford County

- Location within the state of Michigan Location within the United States
- Coordinates: 44°27′41″N 85°44′51″W
- Country: United States
- State: Michigan
- County: Wexford
- Established: 1885

Government
  - Supervisor: David Williams
  - Clerk: Teresa Hankins

Area
  - Total: 36.54 sq mi (94.64 km^{2})
  - Land: 36.54 sq mi (94.64 km^{2})
  - Water: 0 sq mi (0.00 km^{2})
- Elevation: 1,086 ft (331 m)

Population (2020)
  - Total: 1,161
  - Density: 31.77/sq mi (12.27/km^{2})
- Time zone: UTC-5 (Eastern (EST))
  - Summer (DST): UTC-4 (EDT)
- ZIP code(s): 49620 (Buckley); 49625 (Copemish); 49668 (Mesick); 49683 (Thompsonville)
- Area code: 231
- FIPS code: 26-86500
- GNIS feature ID: 1627253
- Website: https://wexfordtsp.org/

Wexford Township is a civil township of Wexford County in the U.S. state of Michigan. The population was 1,161 at the 2020 census.

== Communities ==
- Bagnall is an unincorporated community within the township at 44°25′38″N 85°45′31″W. The community was settled in 1888 with a railway station along the Ann Arbor Railroad. A post office named Farnsworth opened on June 20, 1889 and was named after the Farnsworth & Chesbrough company, which operated a grist mill and sawmill in the area. The post office name was changed to Bagnall on December 29, 1902, but it is no longer in operation.
- Claggettville is a former settlement founded in 1897 along the Ann Arbor Railroad just west of the community of Sherman. Claggettville, which was also referred to as West Sherman, was the site of a large mill.
- Harlan is an unincorporated community located along the county line with Manistee County at 44°27′25″N 85°45′10″W. The community began as a railway station along the Ann Arbor Railroad in 1888. For state purposes, the Manistee County portion was named Churchills within Cleon Township, and the Wexford County portion was named Harlan and given a post office on March 31, 1890. The post office closed briefly in 1906 but remained in operation until July 15, 1935.
- Sherman is an unincorporated community located in the southeast corner of the township at 44°25′26″N 85°41′48″W. The community extends into several neighboring township.
- Wexford is a former settlement within the township. It was settled as early as 1865 by John Lennington. William Masters became the first postmaster of Wexford on February 17, 1865. The community was also referred to as Hanover, and a fire destroyed the community in 1906. It was partially rebuilt but later abandoned.
- Wexford Corner is an unincorporated community located in the northeast corner of the township at 44°30′46″N 85°41′46″W just northwest of the village of Buckley. The community is at a four-point intersection within Hanover Township on the southeast in Wexford County, as well as Grant Township on the northwest and Mayfield Township on the northeast in Grand Traverse County.

== Geography ==
According to the U.S. Census Bureau, the township has a total area of 36.54 square miles (94.64 km^{2}), all land.

=== Major highways ===
- M-37 forms most of the eastern boundary of the township.
- M-115 runs very briefly through the southwest corner of the township.

== Demographics ==
As of the census of 2000, there were 798 people, 298 households, and 213 families residing in the township. The population density was 21.9 per square mile (8.4/km^{2}). There were 379 housing units at an average density of 10.4 per square mile (4.0/km^{2}). The racial makeup of the township was 96.62% White, 0.13% African American, 1.25% Native American, and 2.01% from two or more races. Hispanic or Latino of any race were 0.63% of the population.

There were 298 households, out of which 37.9% had children under the age of 18 living with them, 60.4% were married couples living together, 6.0% had a female householder with no husband present, and 28.2% were non-families. 24.2% of all households were made up of individuals, and 8.7% had someone living alone who was 65 years of age or older. The average household size was 2.68 and the average family size was 3.10.

In the township the population was spread out, with 30.6% under the age of 18, 6.5% from 18 to 24, 28.7% from 25 to 44, 23.9% from 45 to 64, and 10.3% who were 65 years of age or older. The median age was 36 years. For every 100 females, there were 116.3 males. For every 100 females age 18 and over, there were 109.1 males.

The median income for a household in the township was $35,083, and the median income for a family was $37,727. Males had a median income of $25,833 versus $20,074 for females. The per capita income for the township was $14,331. About 8.3% of families and 11.3% of the population were below the poverty line, including 12.2% of those under age 18 and none of those age 65 or over.

== Education ==
Wexford Township is served by three separate school districts. The majority of the township is served by Mesick Consolidated Schools in Mesick. The northeastern portion of the township is served by Buckley Community School District in Buckley. A very small northwestern portion of the township is served by Benzie County Central Schools, which is located to the northwest in Benzie County.
