= Sherman, Michigan =

- Unincorporated community
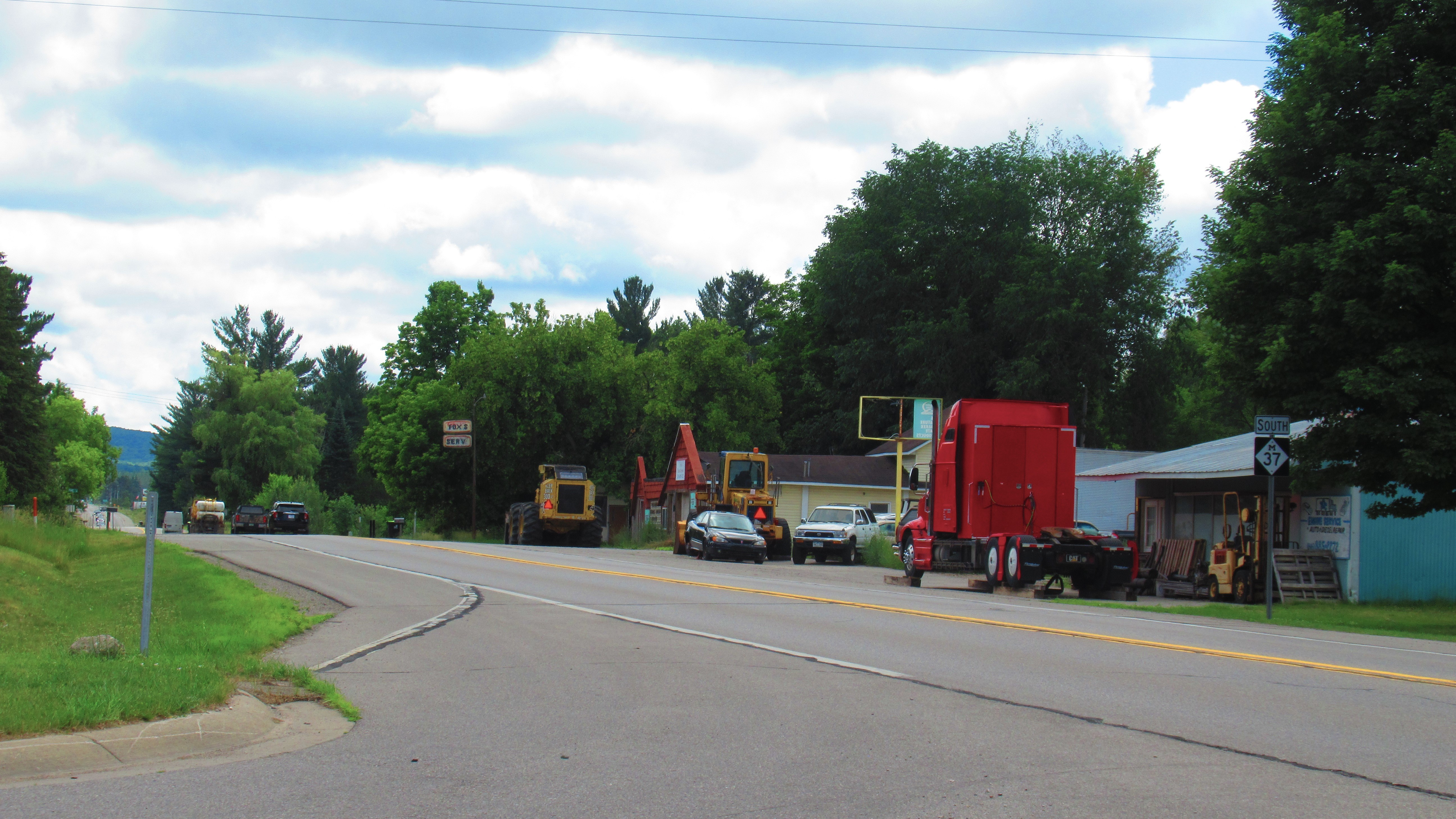
- Looking south along North 13 Road (M-37)

- Location within the state of Michigan Location within the United States
- Coordinates: 44°25′26″N 85°41′48″W
- Country: United States
- State: Michigan
- County: Wexford
- Townships: Antioch, Hanover, Springville, and Wexford
- Settled: 1862
- Platted: 1869
- Incorporated: 1887 (village)
- Disincorporated: 1940
- Elevation: 915 ft (279 m)
- Time zone: UTC-5 (Eastern (EST))
  - Summer (DST): UTC-4 (EDT)
- ZIP code(s): 49668 (Mesick)
- Area code: 231
- GNIS feature ID: 1621586

Sherman is an unincorporated community in Wexford County in the U.S. state of Michigan.

As an unincorporated community, Sherman has no legally defined boundaries or population statistics of its own. The community is located in the northwest portion of the county at the corner of four townships: Antioch, Hanover, Springville, and Wexford.

Settled as early as 1862, it was one of the earliest settlements in Wexford County and served as the first county seat from 1869 until 1881. Sherman incorporated as a village in 1887. A series of fires and population loss caused it to be nearly deserted after 1920, and the village disincorporated around 1940.

== Geography ==
Sherman is a small community located in northwestern Wexford County in Northern Michigan. It is part of the Cadillac micropolitan area. The community sits at the corner of four different civil townships: Wexford Township to the northwest, Hanover Township to the northeast, Springville Township to the southwest, and Antioch Township to the southeast. Sherman sits at an elevation of 915 feet (279 m) above sea level.

The community is located about 20 miles (32 km) north of the city of the Cadillac. M-37 (North 13 Road) is the main roadway through the community, and M-115 (Cadillac Highway) intersects with M-33 about 1.5 miles (2.4 km) to the south in the village Mesick. The village of Buckley is located about 5.5 miles (8.9 km) north along M-37. Other nearby unincorporated communities include Bagnall and Glengary to the west, Wexford Corner to the north, Harlan to the northwest, Meauwataka to the southwest, and Baxter to the northeast.

Briar Hill is located near Sherman to the southeast in Antioch Township. At 1,706 feet (520 m) above sea level, it is one of the highest elevations in the state's Lower Peninsula. The surrounding area is part of the Briar Hills Area in the Manistee National Forest. The Manistee River flows just north of the center of the community. This portion of the river is routinely monitored by the state and is a popular location for boating and fishing. The M-37 bridge crossing at this point is called the Sherman Bridge. The North Country Trail runs through Sherman along M-37 across the bridge and following the river. Burkett Creek is a small tributary of the Manistee River and flows just to the south.

Sherman no longer contains its own post office and is served by the Mesick 49668 ZIP Code. The community is served by Mesick Consolidated Schools.

== History ==
Historical population
Census	Pop.	Note	%±
1900	427		—
1910	260		−39.1%
1920	108		−58.5%
U.S. Decennial Census

The first white settler in the area was Benjamin Hall. In 1862, he built his cabin in what would later become Hanover Township in unorganized Wexford County near the Manistee River. The area was along the Northport State Road, which followed primitive Indian trails leading to the heavily forested areas of Northern Michigan. A bridge was first constructed across the river in 1864, which eventually allowed travel further north to the settlement of Traverse City. In 1867, Lewis J. Clark opened a general store nearby and moved into the area by the following year. Due to the bridge crossing and its location along the river, the new community became known as Manistee Bridge, and a post office opened under that name on February 3, 1868. John Perry served as the first postmaster, and the community was soon renamed Sherman after famed Civil War general William Sherman. The name was chosen by landowner Sanford Gasser, who officially platted the community under that name in 1869. At the time, the only homesteads belonged to Clark, Gasser, and Perry. Clark operated his general store, while Perry briefly operated the county's second sawmill just east of Sherman.

Wexford County was created by legislation in 1840 but not formally organized until 1869. Being one of the earliest settlements in the county, Sherman was selected as the first county seat in 1869. At the time, the majority of the residents in the county lived near Sherman, and nearly all of them came from the state of New York. In an attempt to settle the area, many Civil War veterans moved here and took advantage of government land subsidies. The lumber and railroad industry was also beginning to expand into Northern Michigan, which also brought many more settlers. The earliest industries in Sherman focused on the lumber industry, and numerous sawmills were constructed to exploit the area's ample lumber resources. The community's location near the Manistee River made it easy to float lumber down the river to nearby sawmills.

The county completed a two-story courthouse in Sherman by 1872. The other county settlements of Clam Lake, Manton, and Meauwataka also vied for the county seat, but the new courthouse solidified Sherman's status as the first county seat of Wexford County. By 1872, Sherman was thriving and had a population of around 400 residents. The community contained two hotels, general stores, mechanic shops, a pharmacy, and several sawmills. By 1877, the town was flourishing and now contained two churches, a newspaper, several flour mills, numerous professional offices, and more sawmills.

=== Battle of Manton ===
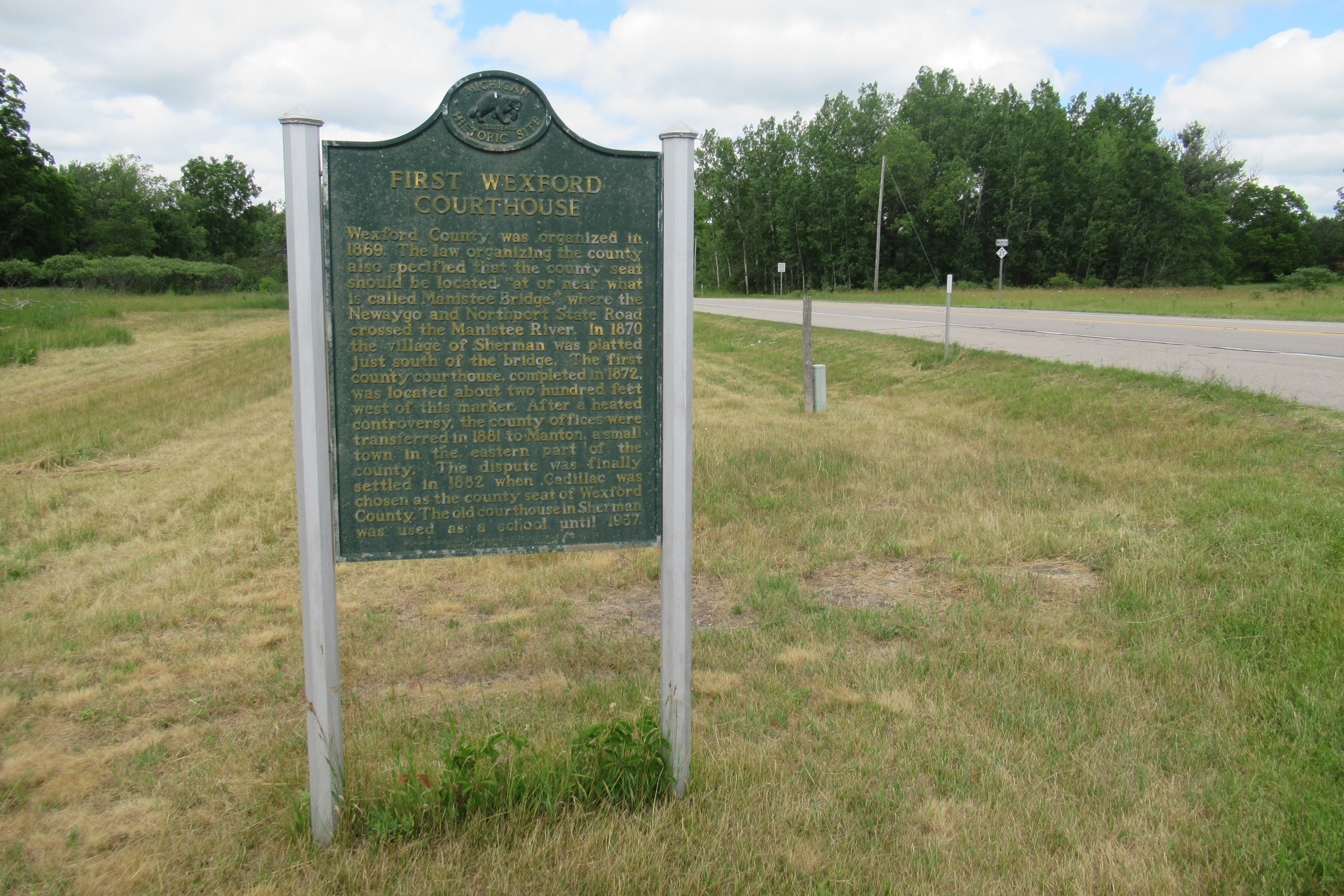
First Wexford Courthouse state historic marker in Sherman

Even though Sherman was designated as the county seat and held the government courthouse and records, the other communities continued to fight in a county seat war for the opportunity to become the county seat of Wexford County. The heated dispute began as soon as the courthouse was completed in 1872. This argument, known as the Battle of Sherman or now more commonly as the Battle of Manton, continued through the decade of the 1870s. By 1877, the argument intensified as Clam Lake (now incorporated as the city of Cadillac) and the village of Manton had growing populations. The argument also involved all the county townships, and the government meetings became very tense. On several occasions, physical violence ensued when the county records were attempted to be stolen by force from the courthouse in Sherman. Prominent Cadillac businessman and mayor George A. Mitchell once led a coalition to Sherman and attempted to bribe local officials to hand over the records.

Warren Seaman was the township supervisor of Cedar Creek Township, where the village of Manton was located. He passively sided with Cadillac in the county seat argument. In response, he was kidnapped and forced to resign as township supervisor in favor of a pro-Manton supervisor. Numerous bribes, political scandals, controversies, and threats of violence took place, as Cadillac, Manton, and Sherman advocates battled for the right to serve as the county seat. A militia even attempted to kidnap another township supervisor and force him to vote in favor of Cadillac for county seat, but the plot failed when the voting meeting turned into chaos. Sherman officials remained confident in retaining the status as county seat, and they survived a county-wide April 1879 election that voted 971–290 in favor of Sherman as the county seat over Manton.

In 1880, Sherman would ultimately lose the battle when the community suffered a devastating fire that destroyed most of its businesses. The courthouse remained standing, but the destruction in Sherman forced the county to move its government offices and records to Manton. This effectively surrendered Sherman as the county seat of Wexford County, and Manton was designated as the new tentative county seat in 1881. The battle for the county seat continued among Cadillac and Manton, while Sherman struggled to rebuild itself. A controversial vote in 1882 gave Cadillac, which had a substantially larger population, the right to serve as the permanent county seat.

=== Village of Sherman ===
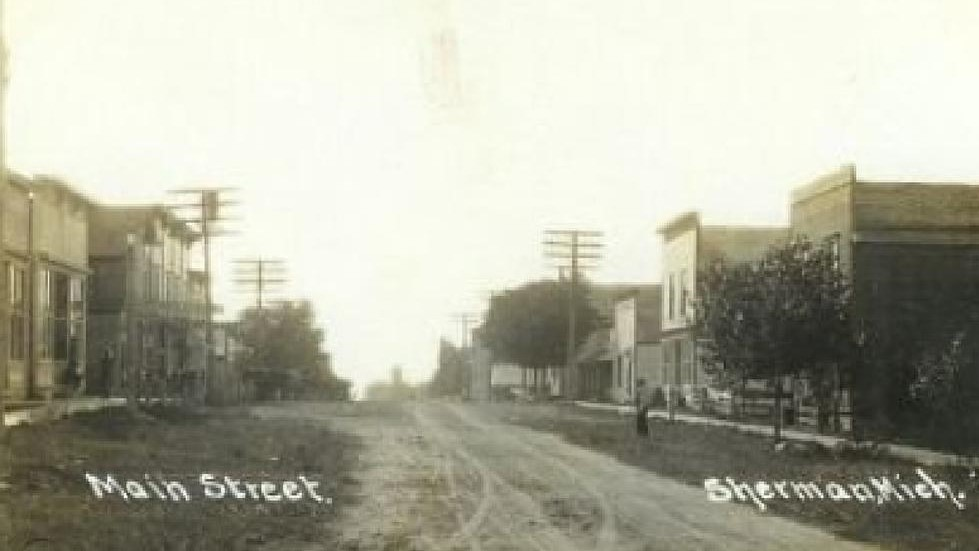
Historic photo of Sherman around 1900

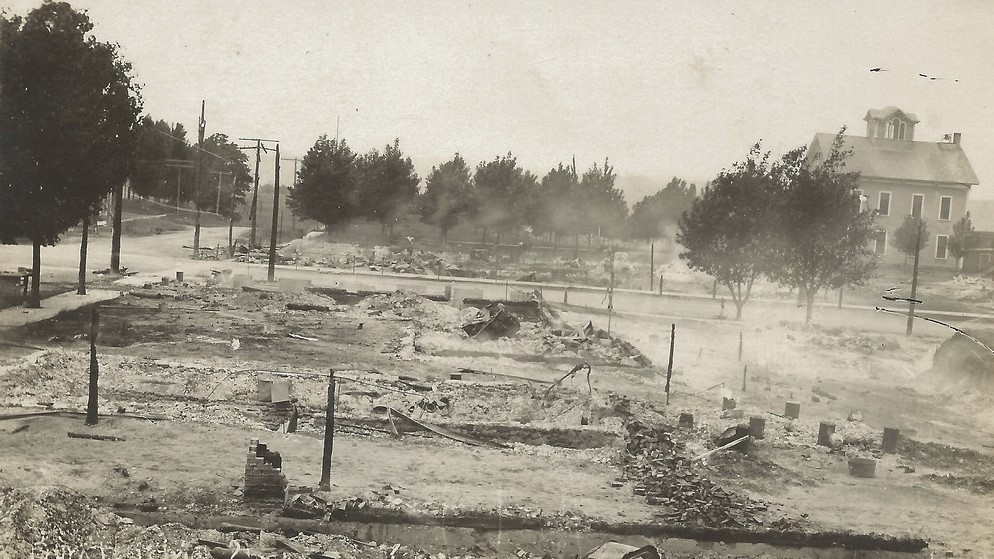
A fire in 1909 destroyed the business district of the village; the Exchange Hotel is the only remaining structure in this photo.

Following the fire in 1880, the community was quickly rebuilt. In 1885, the former courthouse was purchased by the community and converted into a school. Sherman formally incorporated as a village in 1887 in anticipation of the expanding railway. A formal map of the village was published in 1889. Although it was incorporated at the time, it was not recorded in the 1890 census.

The Toledo, Ann Arbor, and North Michigan Railway expanded its railroad lines into the area by 1890. However, the residents of Sherman were devastated when the railway did not expand north to the community. The railway was built through the nearby community of Mesick just to the south but then continued west instead of expanding slightly north to Sherman. Despite no direct railway access, the community was thriving by 1895. At the time, Sherman contained five sawmills, a bank, two pharmacies, doctors, saloons, and numerous other businesses. The most prominent structure within the community was the Exchange Hotel, which was a three-story hotel that contained 37 rooms. In 1900, a telegraph station was built in Sherman. At the 1900 census, the village recorded a population of 427.

At the time, Sherman was one of the fastest growing communities in Northern Michigan, but a lack of direct railroad access halted further development. Sherman continued as a lumber community and stopover for travelers. However, another devastating fire in 1909 destroyed most of the community and the entire business district, with the Exchange Hotel remaining as the only standing business. This forced any remaining lumber companies and many residents to leave Sherman. The post office was also disestablished soon after. At the 1910 census, the village population decreased to 260 residents.

In 1919, the original M-42 state highway was commissioned and ran directly through Sherman along the original route of the Northport State Road. This short state highway ran from Manton to near Traverse City. However, the highway did not help the fledgling community. As an incorporated village, Sherman was last recorded during the 1920 census with a population of 108 residents. Soon after, the village became mostly abandoned and did not record a population in future censuses. Although the village remained incorporated, it apparently had very few residents and no elected officials. The school, which occupied the former courthouse, closed in 1937. The village of Sherman disincorporated around 1940 and returned to the status of an unincorporated community.

=== Recent history ===
Following its loss of population and village status by 1940, Sherman was mostly abandoned. The streets became overgrown with weeds, and many remaining structures fell into disrepair. In 1940, the main roadway of M-42 was redesignated as part of the longer M-37, which continues to run through the center of the community. By 1968, Sherman had one grocery store and gas station. The site of the now-demolished courthouse in Sherman was dedicated as the First Wexford Courthouse Michigan State Historic Site on February 28, 1969. The historic marker stands in the northern part of the community at M-37 and Manistee Street. The struggle for the county seat of Wexford County was commemorated with the Battle of Manton state historic marker on June 18, 1970. This marker is located to the east in the city of Manton.

Sherman continues to exist as an unincorporated community just north of the village of Mesick along M-37. The community has a small permanent population and a few small businesses; although, it may still be considered a ghost town due to its decline and lack of growth after the 1920s.

== Notable people ==
- Ed Wheeler, professional baseball player for the Brooklyn Superbas in 1902, born in Sherman.
