= Antioch Township, Michigan =

- Civil township
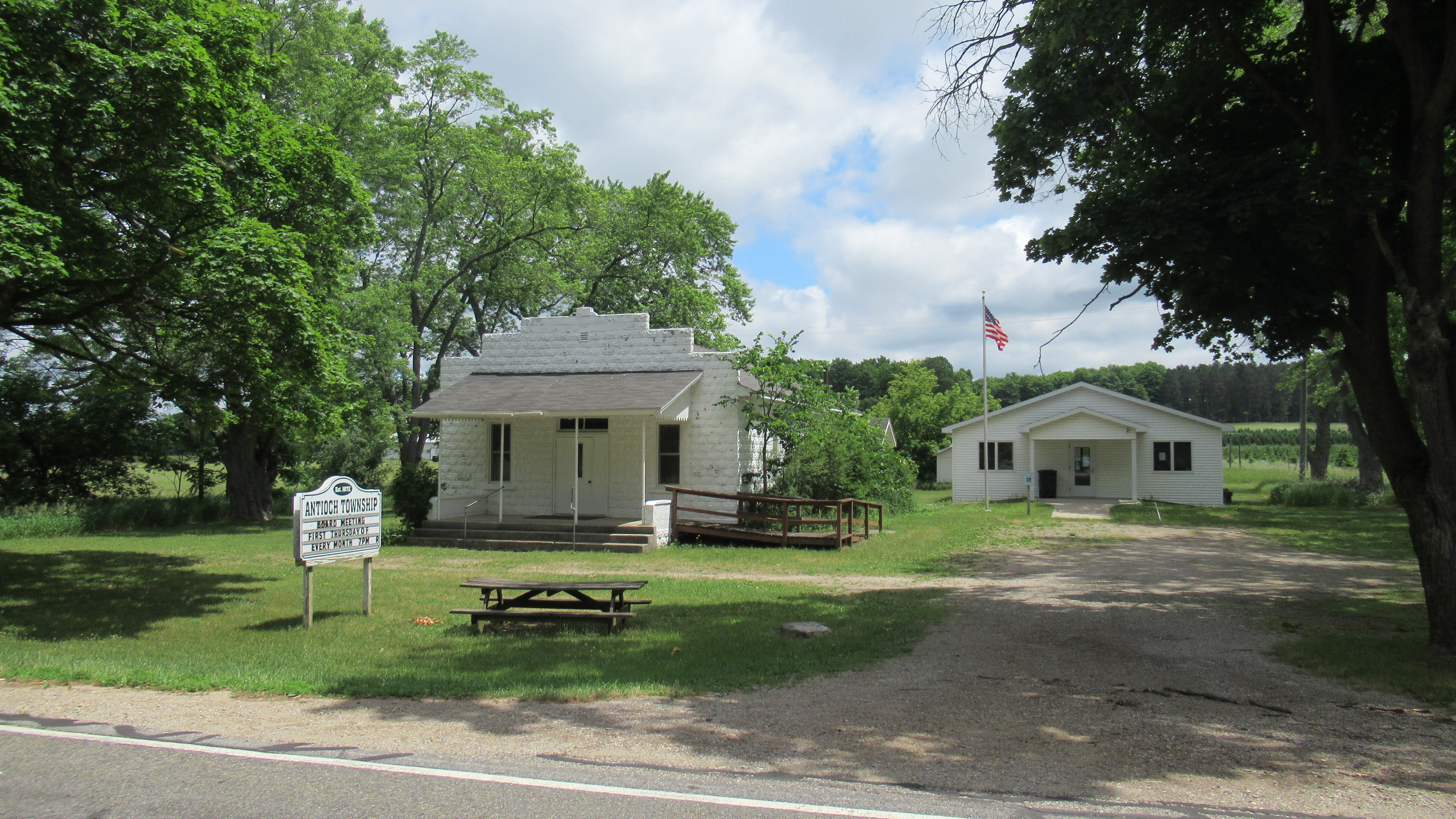
- Antioch Township Hall

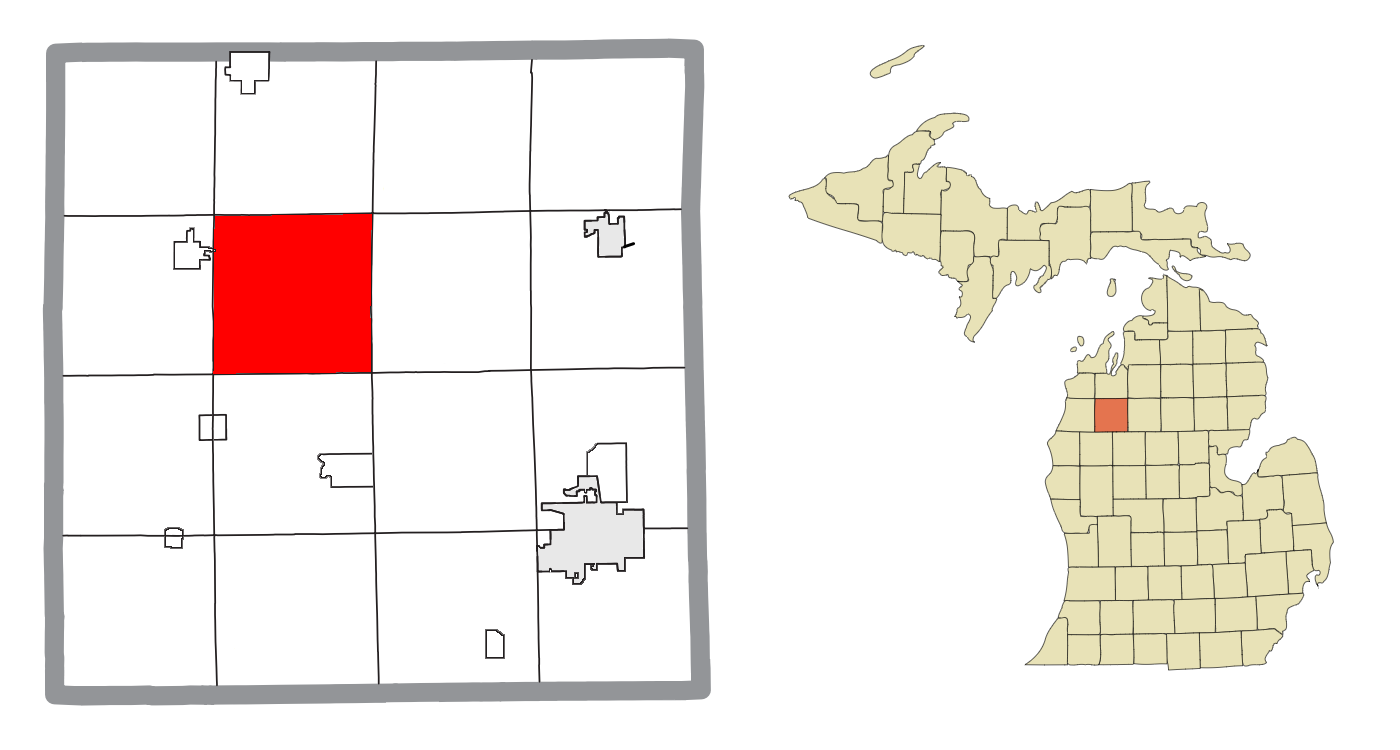
- Location within Wexford County

- Location within the state of Michigan Location within the United States
- Coordinates: 44°23′05″N 85°38′42″W
- Country: United States
- State: Michigan
- County: Wexford
- Organized: 1872

Government
  - Supervisor: Tom Williams
  - Clerk: Darby Terpstra

Area
  - Total: 35.26 sq mi (91.32 km^{2})
  - Land: 35.22 sq mi (91.22 km^{2})
  - Water: 0.039 sq mi (0.10 km^{2})
- Elevation: 1,119 ft (341 m)

Population (2020)
  - Total: 900
  - Density: 26/sq mi (9.9/km^{2})
- Time zone: UTC-5 (Eastern (EST))
  - Summer (DST): UTC-4 (EDT)
- ZIP code(s): 49618 (Boon); 49663 (Manton); 49668 (Mesick)
- Area code: 231
- FIPS code: 26-03060
- GNIS feature ID: 1625839
- Website: https://antiochtownship.org/

Antioch Township is a civil township of Wexford County in the U.S. state of Michigan. The population was 900 at the 2020 census.

The township is home to Briar Hill, the highest elevation in the Lower Peninsula at 1,706 feet (520 m) above sea level.

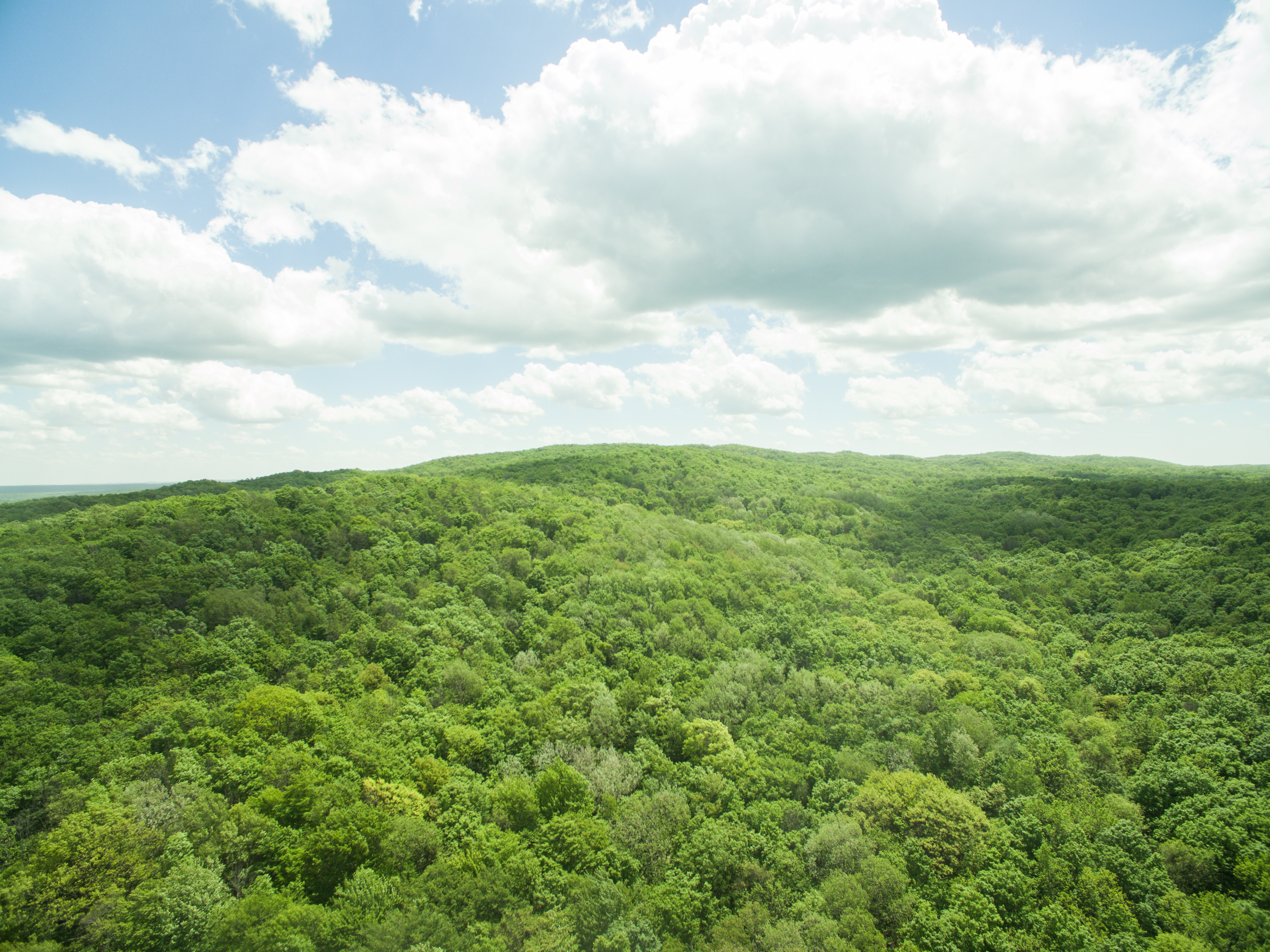
Briar Hill, the highest point in Michigan's Lower Peninsula, is located within Antioch Township.

== Communities ==
- Mesick is a village located almost entirely within Springville Township to the west. The United States Census Bureau lists Mesick as extending into Antioch Township with only 0.01 square miles (0.03 km^{2}) of the village and no population within the township.
- Sherman is an unincorporated community on M-37 at the northwest corner of the township.

== Geography ==
According to the U.S. Census Bureau, the township has a total area of 35.26 square miles (91.32 km^{2}), of which 35.22 square miles (91.22 km^{2}) is land and 0.04 square miles (0.10 km^{2}) (0.11%) is water.

=== Major highways ===
- M-37 forms a small northwestern boundary of the township.
- M-115 runs diagonally southeast–northwest through the center of the township.

== Demographics ==
As of the census of 2000, there were 810 people, 306 households, and 227 families residing in the township. The population density was 23.0 inhabitants per square mile (8.9/km^{2}). There were 434 housing units at an average density of 12.3 per square mile (4.7/km^{2}). The racial makeup of the township was 96.91% White, 1.73% Native American, 0.49% Asian, and 0.86% from two or more races. Hispanic or Latino of any race were 0.86% of the population.

There were 306 households, out of which 33.7% had children under the age of 18 living with them, 63.4% were married couples living together, 5.9% had a female householder with no husband present, and 25.5% were non-families. 21.2% of all households were made up of individuals, and 8.2% had someone living alone who was 65 years of age or older. The average household size was 2.62 and the average family size was 3.03.

In the township the population was spread out, with 25.4% under the age of 18, 7.8% from 18 to 24, 30.2% from 25 to 44, 24.2% from 45 to 64, and 12.3% who were 65 years of age or older. The median age was 37 years. For every 100 females, there were 108.2 males. For every 100 females age 18 and over, there were 102.7 males.

The median income for a household in the township was $32,679, and the median income for a family was $35,375. Males had a median income of $28,000 versus $20,000 for females. The per capita income for the township was $15,387. About 5.9% of families and 9.7% of the population were below the poverty line, including 11.9% of those under age 18 and 2.8% of those age 65 or over.

== Education ==
Antioch Township is served entirely by Mesick Consolidated Schools, which is located to the west in the village of Mesick.
