= Hanover Township, Michigan =

Hanover Township may refer to the following places in the U.S. state of Michigan:

- Hanover Township, Jackson County, Michigan
- Hanover Township, Wexford County, Michigan

== See also ==
- Hanover, Michigan, a village in Jackson County
