= Hanover Township, Wexford County, Michigan =

Hanover Township, Michigan
- Civil township
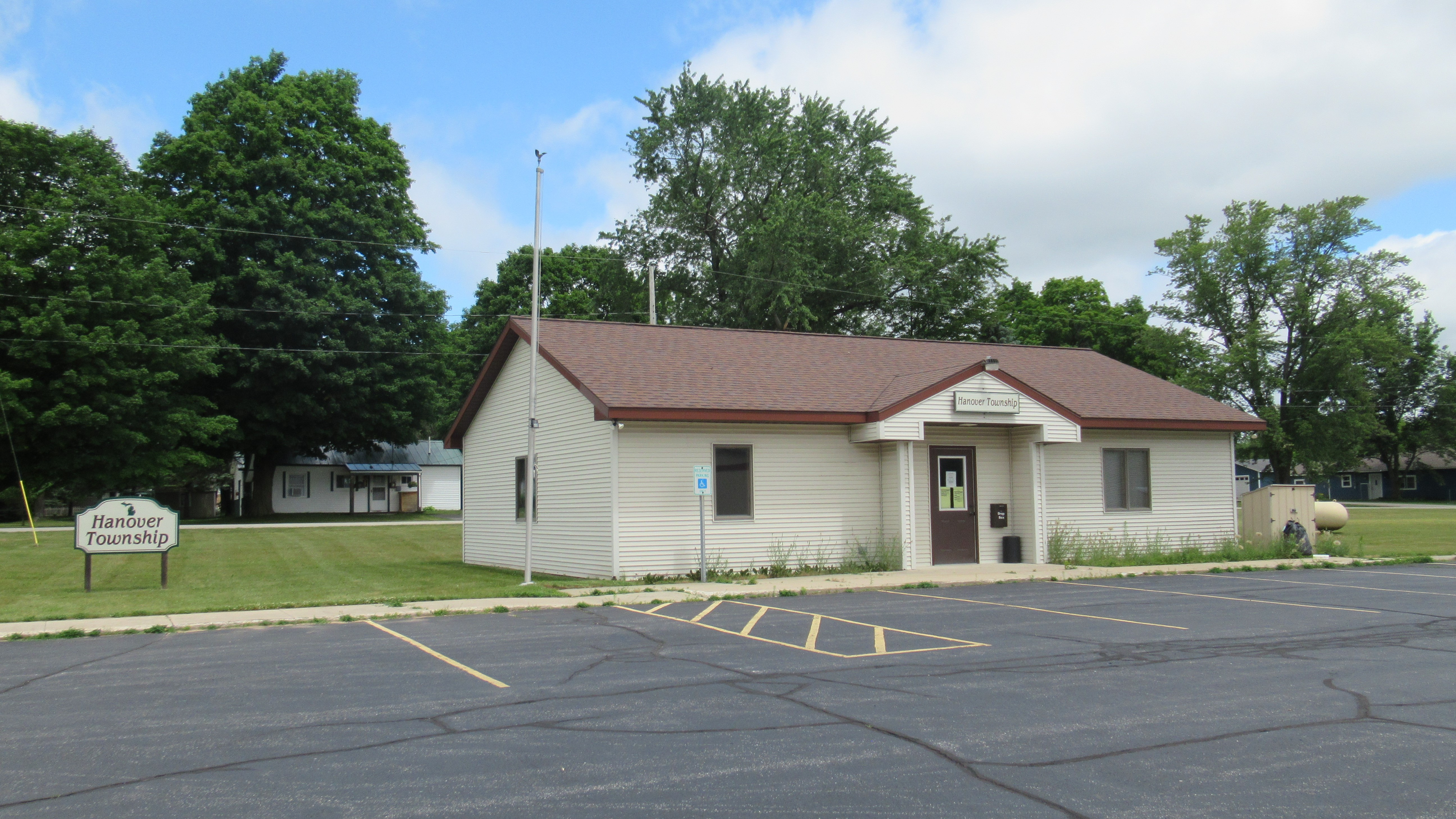
- Hanover Township Hall in Buckley

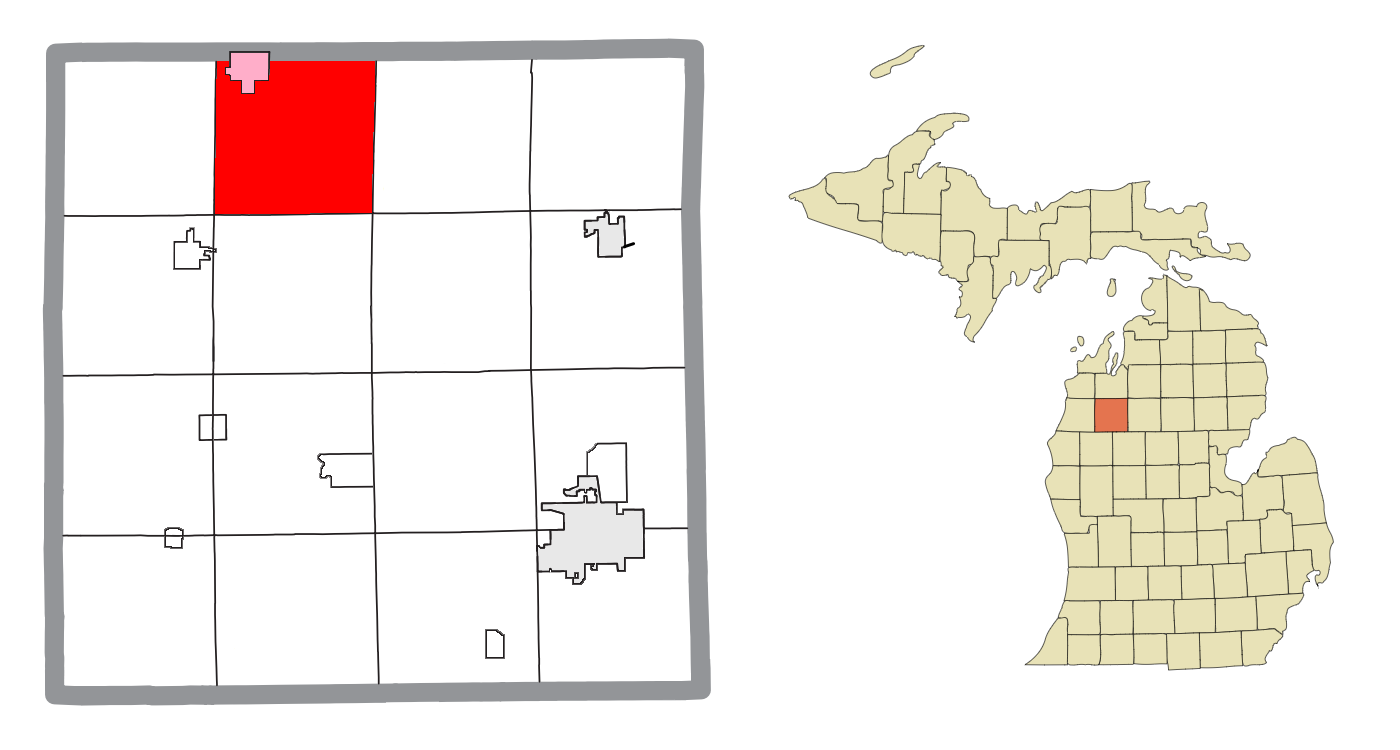
- Location within Wexford County (red) and the administered village of Buckley (pink)

- Location within the state of Michigan Location within the United States
- Coordinates: 44°28′30″N 85°38′50″W
- Country: United States
- State: Michigan
- County: Wexford
- Established: 1869

Government
  - Supervisor: Peter Hansen
  - Clerk: Terri Schichtel

Area
  - Total: 36.15 sq mi (93.63 km^{2})
  - Land: 35.99 sq mi (93.21 km^{2})
  - Water: 0.16 sq mi (0.41 km^{2})
- Elevation: 1,047 ft (319 m)

Population (2020)
  - Total: 1,698
  - Density: 47.18/sq mi (18.22/km^{2})
- Time zone: UTC-5 (Eastern (EST))
  - Summer (DST): UTC-4 (EDT)
- ZIP code(s): 49620 (Buckley); 49649 (Kingsley); 49663 (Manton); 49668 (Mesick)
- Area code: 231
- FIPS code: 26-36420
- GNIS feature ID: 1626432
- Website: Official website

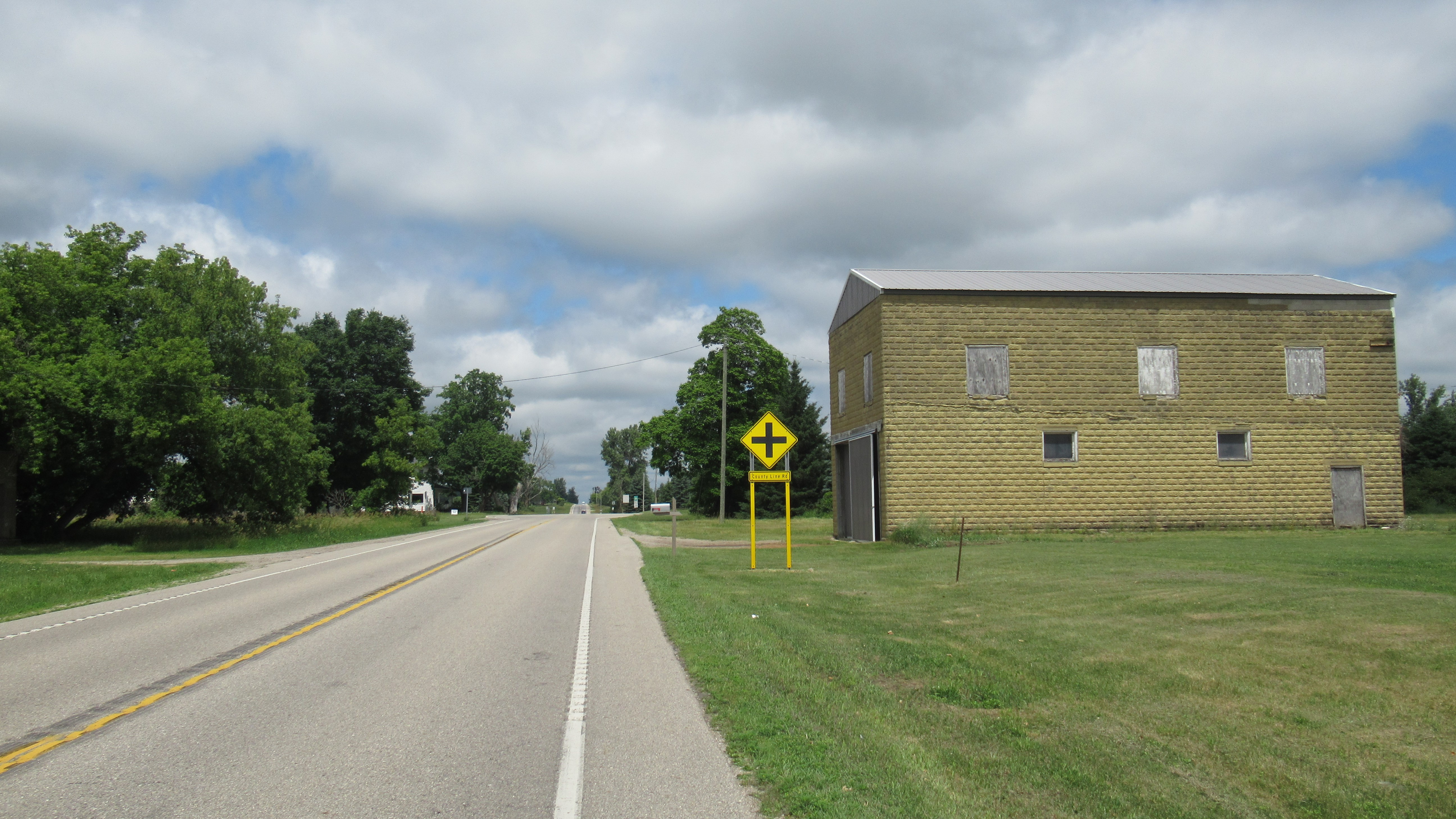
Unincorporated community of Wexford Corner within Hanover Township

Hanover Township is a civil township of Wexford County in the U.S. state of Michigan. The population was 1,698 at the 2020 census.

== Communities ==
- Buckley is a village in the northwest portion of the township.
- Sherman is an unincorporated community on M-37 in the southwest corner of the township.
- Wexford Corner is an unincorporated community located in the northwest corner of the township at 44°30′46″N 85°41′46″W just northwest of the village of Buckley. The community is at a four-point intersection within Wexford Township on the southwest in Wexford County, as well as Grant Township on the northwest and Mayfield Township on the northeast in Grand Traverse County.

== Geography ==
According to the U.S. Census Bureau, the township has a total area of 36.15 square miles (93.63 km^{2}), of which 35.99 square miles (93.21 km^{2}) is land and 0.16 square miles (0.41 km^{2}) (0.44%) is water.

The Manistee River flows through the township.

=== Major highways ===
- M-37 forms most of the western boundary of the township.

== Demographics ==
As of the census of 2000, there were 1,200 people, 441 households, and 333 families residing in the township. The population density was 33.3 inhabitants per square mile (12.9/km^{2}). There were 639 housing units at an average density of 17.7 per square mile (6.8/km^{2}). The racial makeup of the township was 95.25% White, 0.42% African American, 1.17% Native American, 0.17% Asian, 1.42% from other races, and 1.58% from two or more races. Hispanic or Latino of any race were 3.17% of the population.

There were 441 households, out of which 36.3% had children under the age of 18 living with them, 60.3% were married couples living together, 10.0% had a female householder with no husband present, and 24.3% were non-families. 18.6% of all households were made up of individuals, and 7.3% had someone living alone who was 65 years of age or older. The average household size was 2.71 and the average family size was 3.06.

In the township the population was spread out, with 28.3% under the age of 18, 9.1% from 18 to 24, 29.3% from 25 to 44, 22.3% from 45 to 64, and 11.0% who were 65 years of age or older. The median age was 35 years. For every 100 females, there were 95.8 males. For every 100 females age 18 and over, there were 98.6 males.

The median income for a household in the township was $36,850, and the median income for a family was $38,920. Males had a median income of $31,188 versus $20,592 for females. The per capita income for the township was $15,271. About 4.6% of families and 5.8% of the population were below the poverty line, including 5.6% of those under age 18 and 6.8% of those age 65 or over.

== Education ==
Hanover Township is served by two public school districts. The majority of the township is served by Buckley Community School District, while the southern portion of the township is served by Mesick Consolidated Schools to the southwest in Mesick.
