= Frankfort Dow Memorial Field =

Public airport in Frankfort, Michigan

- IATA: none; ICAO: KFKS; FAA LID: FKS

Summary
- Airport type: Public
- Owner: Frankfort City-County Airport Authority
- Serves: Frankfort, Michigan
- Time zone: UTC−05:00 (-5)
  - Summer (DST): UTC−04:00 (-4)
- Elevation AMSL: 633 ft (193 m)
- Coordinates: 44°37′31″N 086°12′03″W
- Website: FrankfortDowField.com

Map
- Location of airport in Michigan FKS (the United States)

Runways
Direction	Length		Surface
Direction	ft	m	Surface
15/33	4,050	1,234	Asphalt

Statistics (2020)
- Aircraft operations: 4,000
- Based aircraft: 19
- Source: Federal Aviation Administration

Frankfort Dow Memorial Field (ICAO: KFKS, FAA LID: FKS, formerly 3D4) is a public use airport located two nautical miles (3.7 km) southeast of the central business district of Frankfort, a city in Benzie County, Michigan, United States. It is owned by the Frankfort City-County Airport Authority. It is included in the Federal Aviation Administration (FAA) National Plan of Integrated Airport Systems for 2017–2021, in which it is categorized as a general aviation facility.

Although many U.S. airports use the same three-letter location identifier for the FAA and IATA, this airport is assigned FKS by the FAA and no designation from the IATA (which assigned FKS to Fukushima Airport in Fukushima Prefecture, Japan).

== History ==
In 1937, Frankfort was identified as one of the United States' premier spots for glider flying. National soaring meets were held in the area. A flight school was established in Frankfort in the 1940s.

In 2015, the airport's license was downgraded to a basic utility license when it was found there were several trees blocking the runway approaches, taxiway reflectors were missing, runway markings were poor, the windsock was torn and faded, and there were snowplow divots in the end safety area on one of the runways. This made the airport ineligible for grants under the capital improvement plan. The license wasn't upgraded back to a general utility license until later that fall.

In 2016, a 20-year airport layout plan calling for the acquisition of several adjacent parcels of land was adopted by the airport. This would help the airport clear nearby farmland of obstructions that protrude into approach paths.

The airport's management has faced claims of discrimination in recent years, with former board members saying they were wrongly removed from their posts and hangar renters saying their fees have unreasonably increased. In 2017, a complaint was filed with the Michigan Department of Transportation.

== Facilities and aircraft ==
Frankfort Dow Memorial Field covers an area of 168 acres (68 ha) at an elevation of 633 feet (193 m) above mean sea level. It has one runway designated 15/33 with an asphalt surface measuring 4,050 by 75 feet (1,234 x 23 m). The airport is staffed from 8AM until 5PM.

The airport has a fixed-base operator that offers fuel, general maintenance, hangars, a conference room, a crew lounge, snooze rooms, and more.

For the 12-month period ending December 31, 2020, the airport had 4,000 general aviation aircraft operations, an average of 77 per week. At that time there were 19 aircraft based at this airport: 17 single-engine airplanes, 1 helicopter, and 1 glider.

=== Transit ===
The airport is accessible by road from Airport Rd, and is close to M-22 and M-115.

== Accidents and incidents ==
- On August 8, 2004, a Cessna 305A on a glider-tow flight impacted terrain after takeoff from Dow Memorial. The Cessna pilot reported the glider was released from the tow line while on the takeoff run, and the tow plane yawed left and veered off the takeoff path, then crossing a marsh southwest of the runway. The pilot said that the engine was at full power but the plane was still at minimum controllable airspeed. The probable cause was found to be the tow pilot's failure to maintain directional control during takeoff as well as his failure to abort the takeoff. Additionally, the tow pilot failed to attain adequate airspeed which resulted in a stall.
- On July 31, 2009, a Cessna 337F Skymaster impacted trees and terrain after takeoff from Dow Memorial. A witness also preparing to depart from the airport said the pilot had the cowlings off the rear engine of the accident aircraft to fix an oil leak. The pilot planned to feather that engine and depart with only the front engine. The probable cause was found to be the pilot intentionally attempting to take off with an inoperative engine, which lead to the airplane's inability to maintain airspeed in the initial climb, resulting in a stall and impact with trees.
- On August 3, 2014, a Great Lakes 2T 1A 2 crashed while landing at Dow Memorial Field. During the landing flare, the aircraft landed hard and bounce, at which point its nose shifted 30 degrees from the runway. The pilot added power to go around, but the left wing dropped and impacted terrain. The probable cause of the accident was found to be the pilot's improper recovery from a bounced landing in gusty, crosswind conditions.
- On July 30, 2016, an Aerostar S.A. Festival R40S crashed while landing in gusty conditions at Dow Memorial Field. The pilot reported the right wing was lifted and the aircraft drifted off the runway to the left, where it impacted terrain and its nose gear collapsed, resulting in substantial damage to the right wing. The probable cause was found to be the pilot's failure to maintain directional control during the landing roll in gusty crosswind conditions, which resulted in a runway excursion, a nose gear collapse, and impact with terrain.

== See also ==
- List of airports in Michigan
