= Springville Township, Michigan =

- Civil township
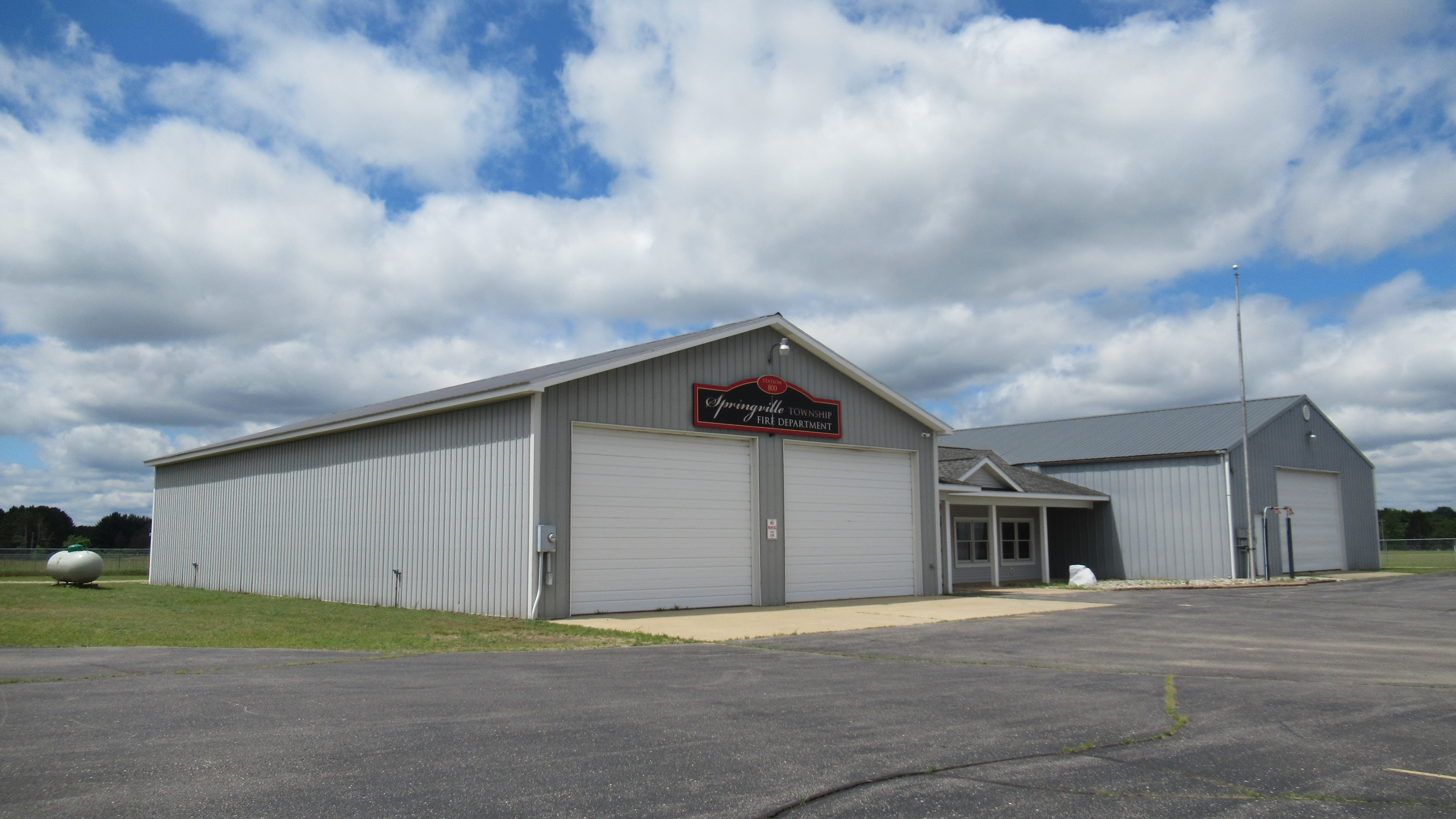
- Springville Township Hall and Fire Department

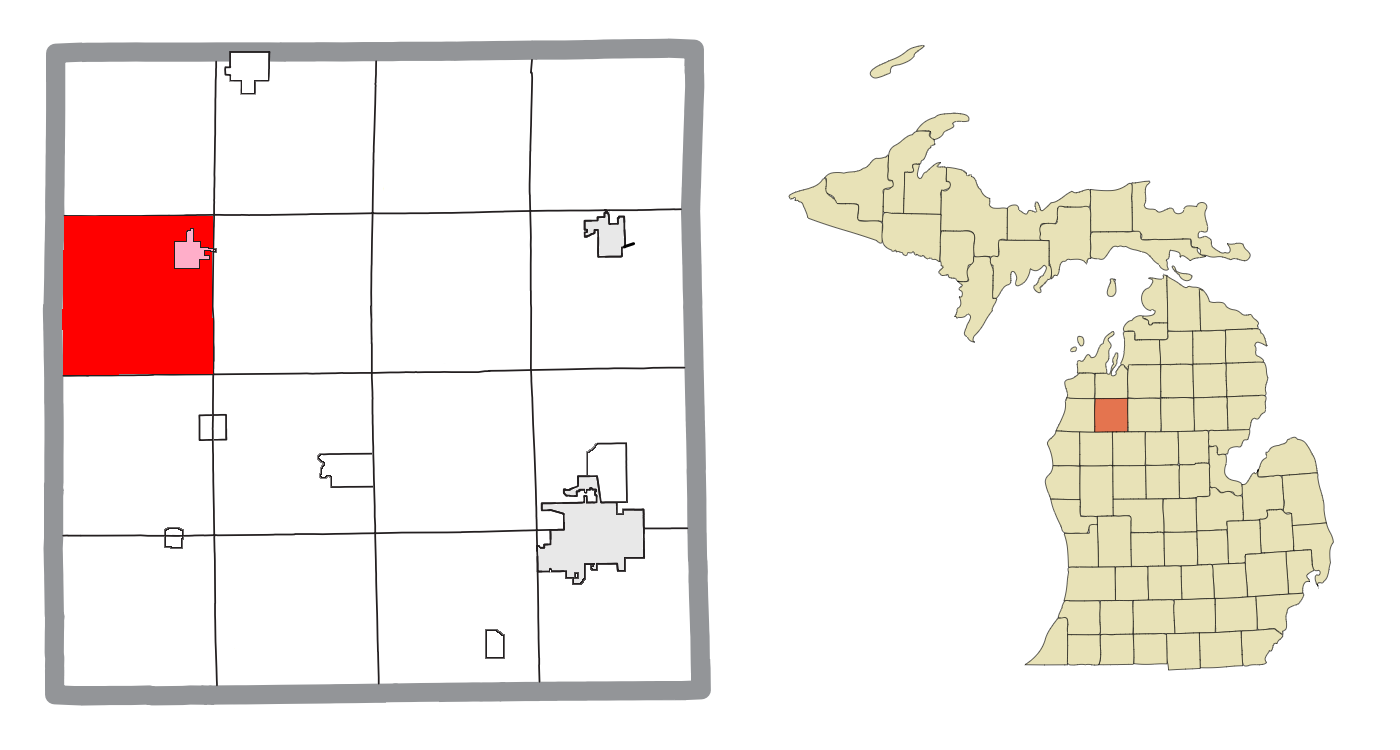
- Location within Wexford County (red) and an administered portion of the Mesick village (pink)

- Location within the state of Michigan Location within the United States
- Coordinates: 44°23′15″N 85°44′47″W
- Country: United States
- State: Michigan
- County: Wexford
- Established: 1869

Government
  - Supervisor: Tim Dzikowicz
  - Clerk: Stacy Brewer

Area
  - Total: 35.53 sq mi (92.02 km^{2})
  - Land: 32.50 sq mi (84.17 km^{2})
  - Water: 3.03 sq mi (7.85 km^{2})
- Elevation: 837 ft (255 m)

Population (2020)
  - Total: 1,739
  - Density: 53.51/sq mi (20.66/km^{2})
- Time zone: UTC-5 (Eastern (EST))
  - Summer (DST): UTC-4 (EDT)
- ZIP code(s): 49668 (Mesick)
- Area code: 231
- FIPS code: 26-75940
- GNIS feature ID: 1627114
- Website: Official website

Springville Township is a civil township of Wexford County in the U.S. state of Michigan. The population was 1,739 at the 2020 census.

== Communities ==
- Coline is a former settlement formed around a power plant and general store operated by the Consumers Power Company. A post office operated briefly in Coline from October 1, 1924 until October 31, 1925.
- Glengary, also spelled as Glengarry, is an unincorporated community within the township at 44°25′23″N 85°43′16″W. It formed as a settlement near Sherman in 1910.
- Mesick is a village located almost entirely within Springville Township, while a very small portion of the village extends east into Antioch Township.
- Sherman is an unincorporated community located in the northeast corner of the township at 44°25′26″N 85°41′48″W. The community extends into several neighboring township.
- Yuma is an unincorporated community located in the south-central portion of the township at 44°20′48″N 85°45′17″W. Yuma was first settled with a railroad station along the Toledo, Ann Arbor & Northern Michigan Railroad in 1888. The community was platted in 1893, and the Yuma post office operated from January 3, 1983 until May 26, 1961.

== Geography ==
According to the U.S. Census Bureau, the township has a total area of 35.53 square miles (92.02 km^{2}), of which 32.50 square miles (84.17 km^{2}) is land and 3.03 square miles (7.85 km^{2}) (8.53%) is water.

The Manistee River flows from the northeast to the southwest through the township. The Hodenpyl Dam is located within the southwest corner of the township and forms the Hodenpyl Dam Pond, which encompasses 1,680 acres (6.80 km^{2}) within the township.

=== Major highways ===
- M-37 runs south–north through the center of the township before running concurrent with M-115 through the village of Mesick.
- M-115 runs east–west through the northern portion of the township.

== Demographics ==
As of the census of 2000, there were 1,673 people, 635 households, and 452 families residing in the township. The population density was 51.1 inhabitants per square mile (19.7/km^{2}). There were 1,015 housing units at an average density of 31.0 per square mile (12.0/km^{2}). The racial makeup of the township was 96.53% White, 0.30% African American, 1.26% Native American, 0.18% Asian, 0.66% from other races, and 1.08% from two or more races. Hispanic or Latino of any race were 0.90% of the population.

There were 635 households, out of which 35.3% had children under the age of 18 living with them, 55.0% were married couples living together, 10.1% had a female householder with no husband present, and 28.7% were non-families. 24.3% of all households were made up of individuals, and 9.8% had someone living alone who was 65 years of age or older. The average household size was 2.63 and the average family size was 3.09.

In the township the population was spread out, with 29.2% under the age of 18, 7.1% from 18 to 24, 28.1% from 25 to 44, 22.1% from 45 to 64, and 13.6% who were 65 years of age or older. The median age was 36 years. For every 100 females, there were 105.5 males. For every 100 females age 18 and over, there were 98.8 males.

The median income for a household in the township was $28,821, and the median income for a family was $32,098. Males had a median income of $26,908 versus $20,729 for females. The per capita income for the township was $12,857. About 11.0% of families and 14.4% of the population were below the poverty line, including 18.0% of those under age 18 and 8.8% of those age 65 or over.

== Education ==
Springville Township is served entirely by Mesick Consolidated Schools in Mesick.

== Images ==
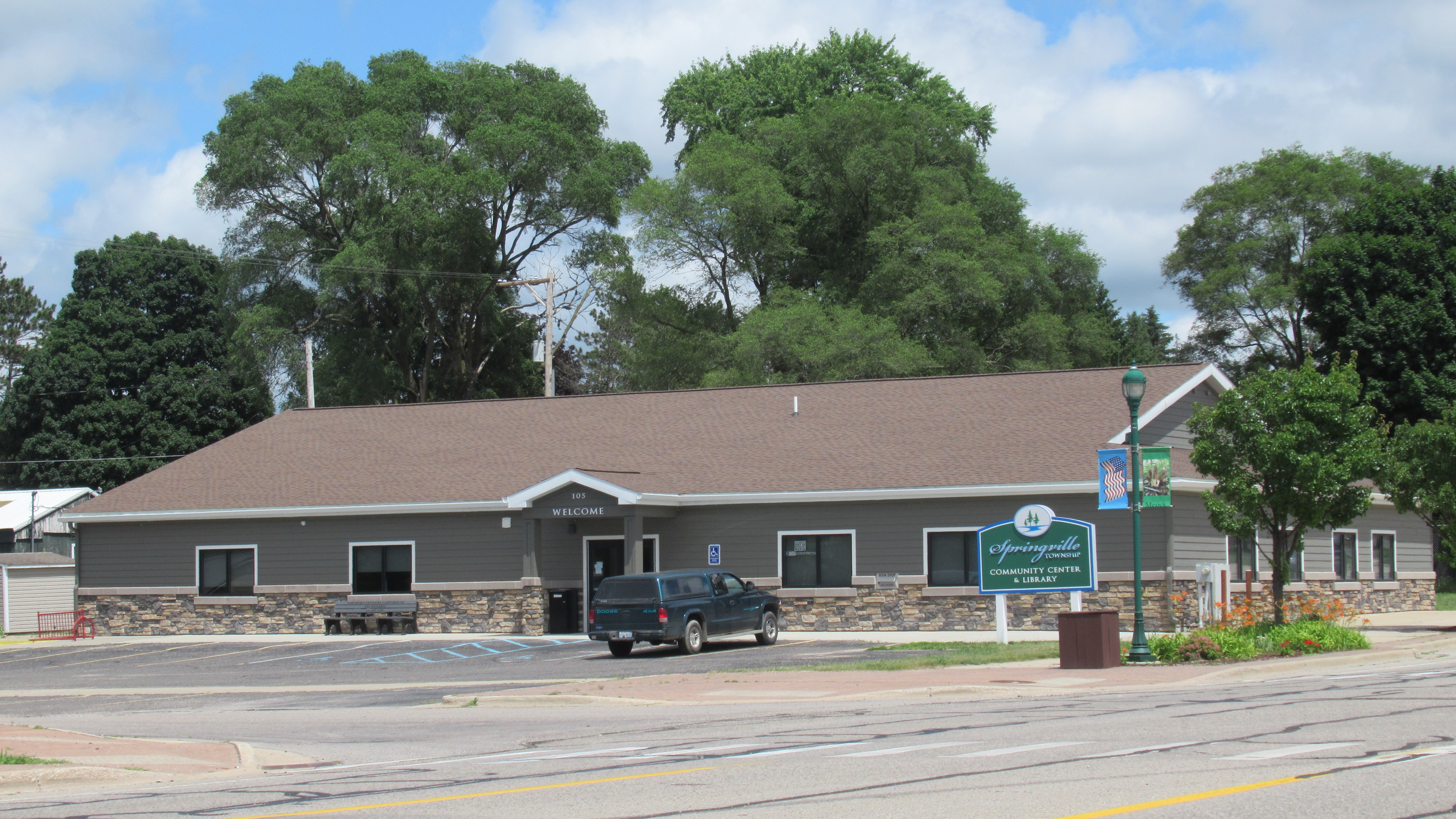
Springville Township Library

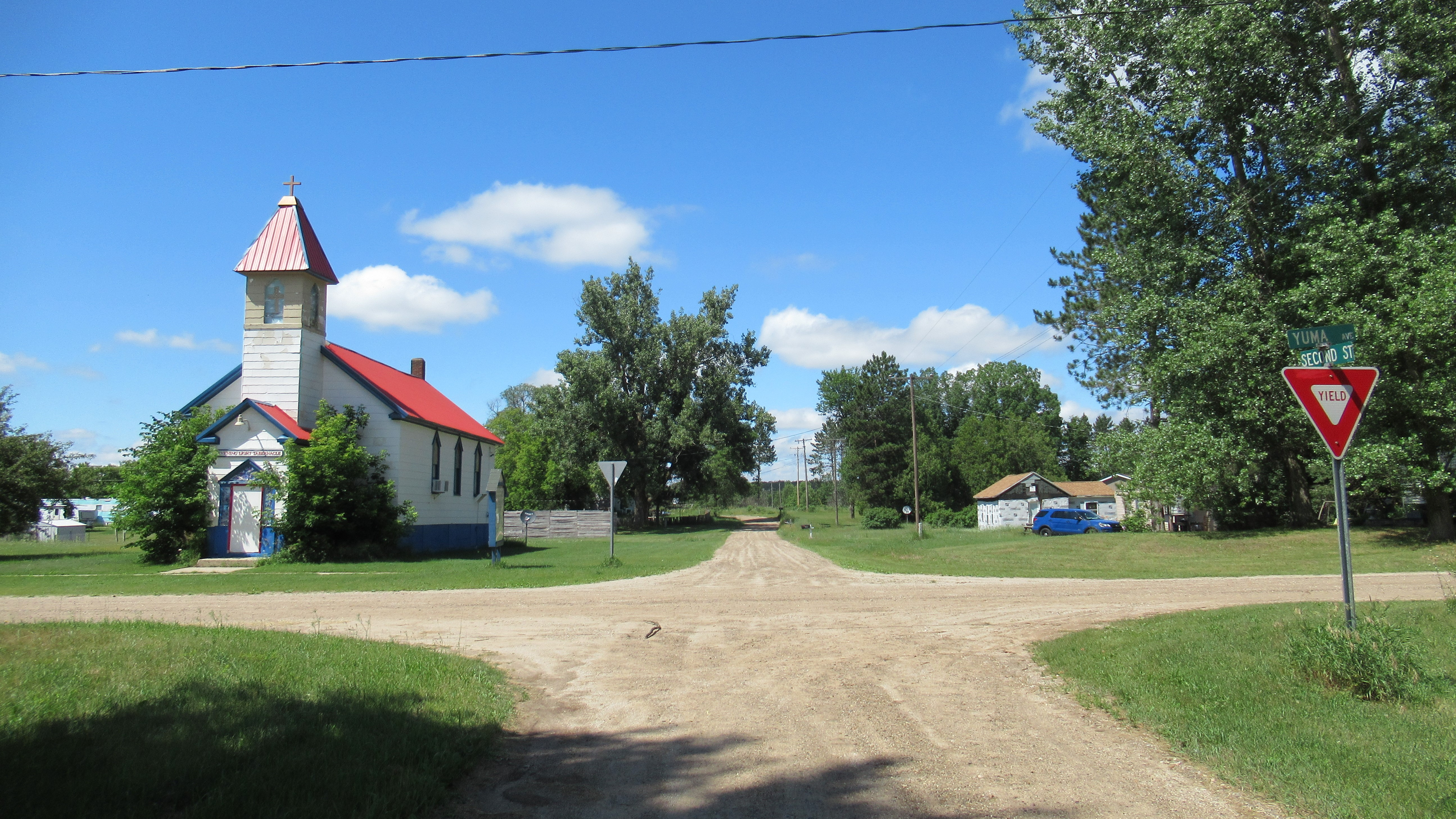
Unincorporated community of Yuma

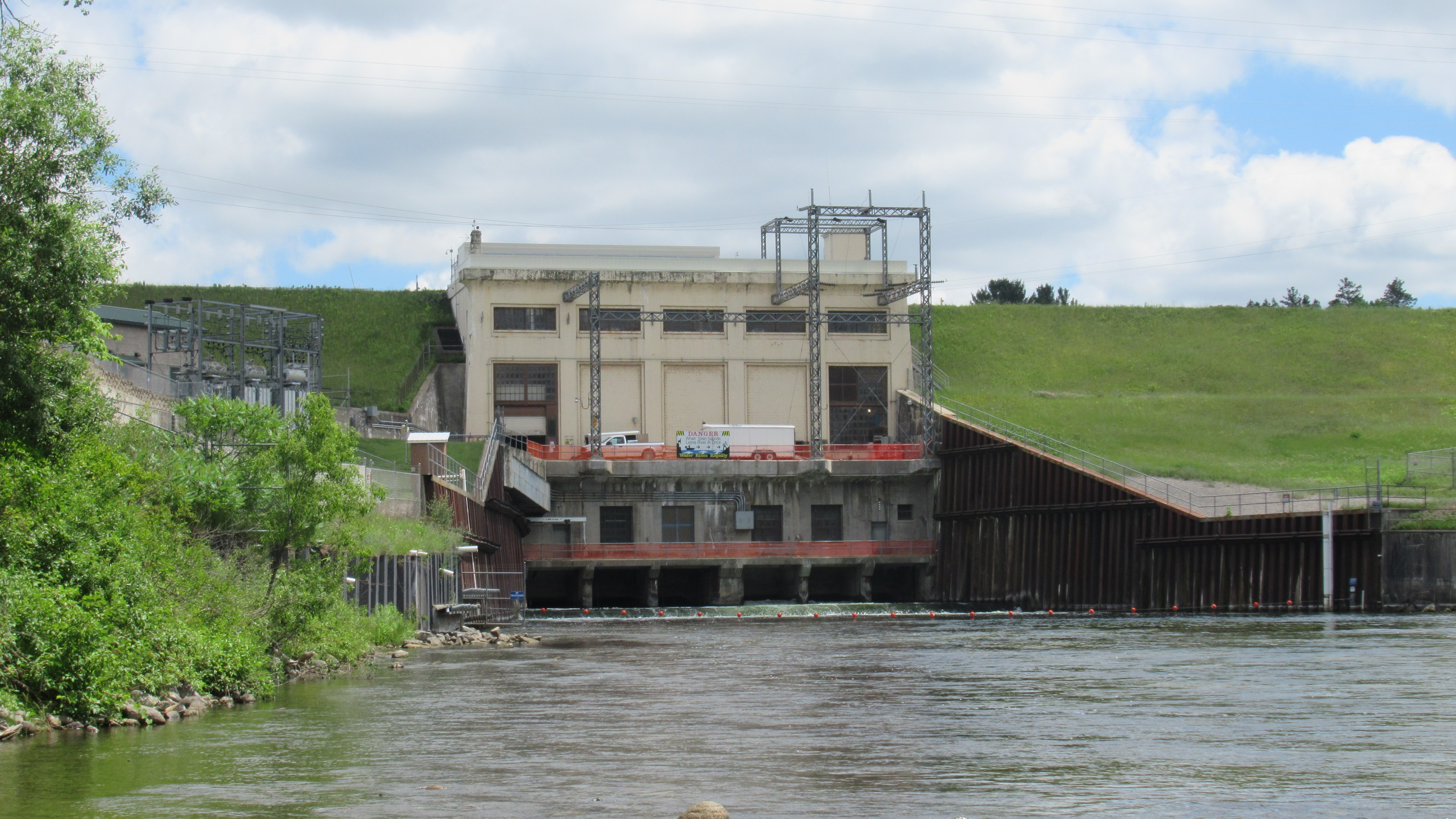
Hodenpyl Dam

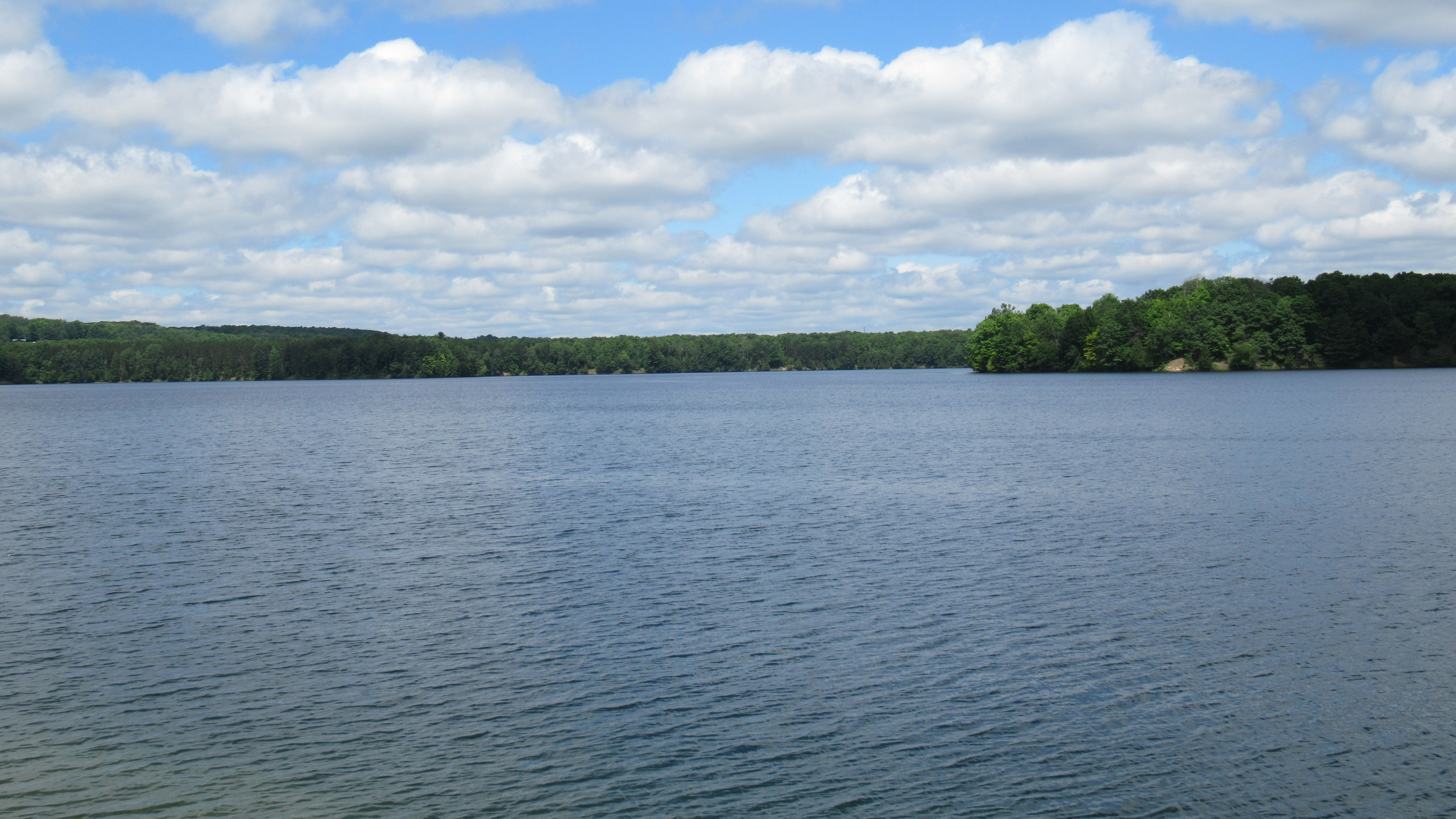
Hodenpyl Dam Pond
