= Buckley, Michigan =

- Village
- Village of Buckley
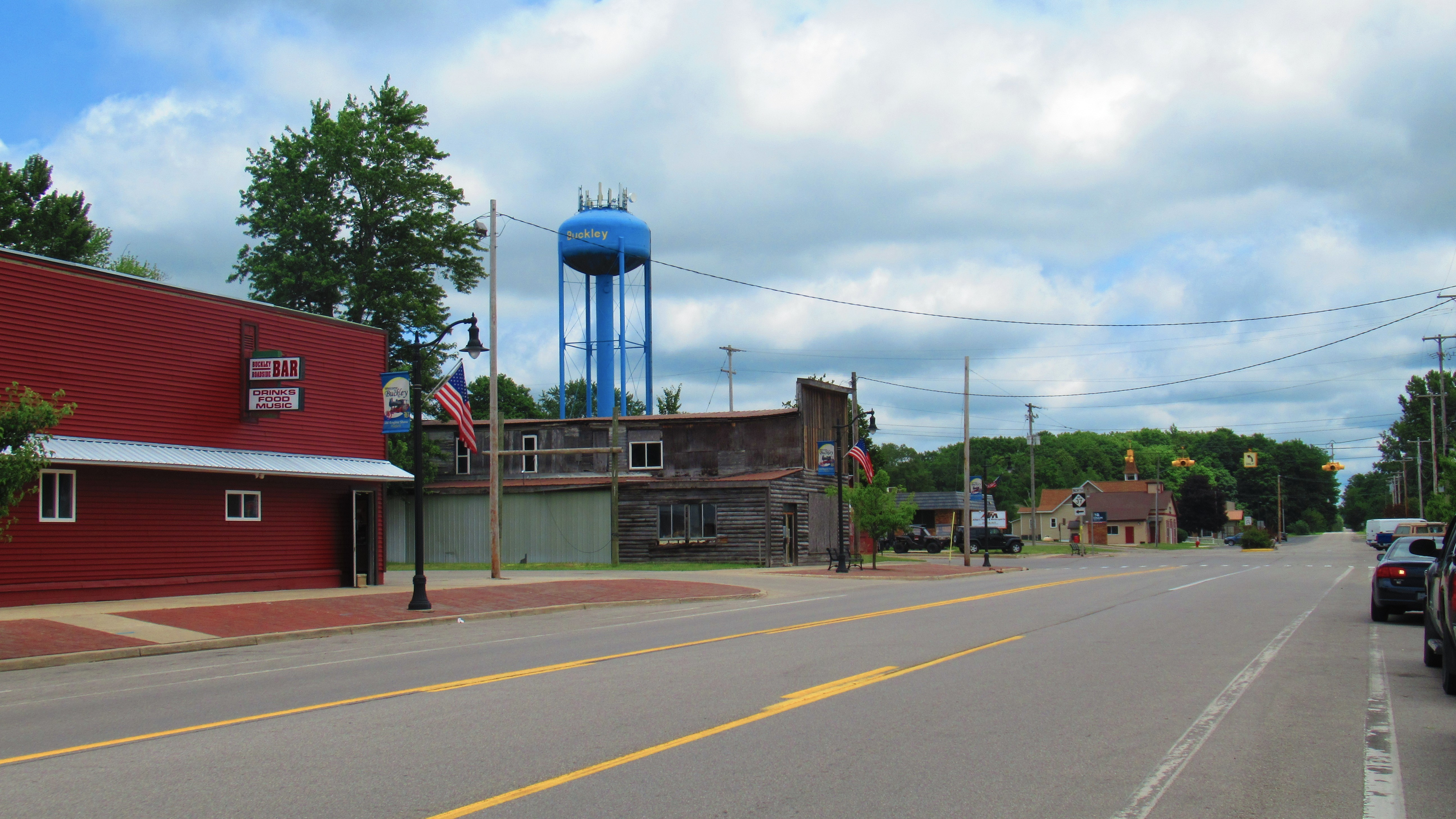
- Looking west along the curve on M-37

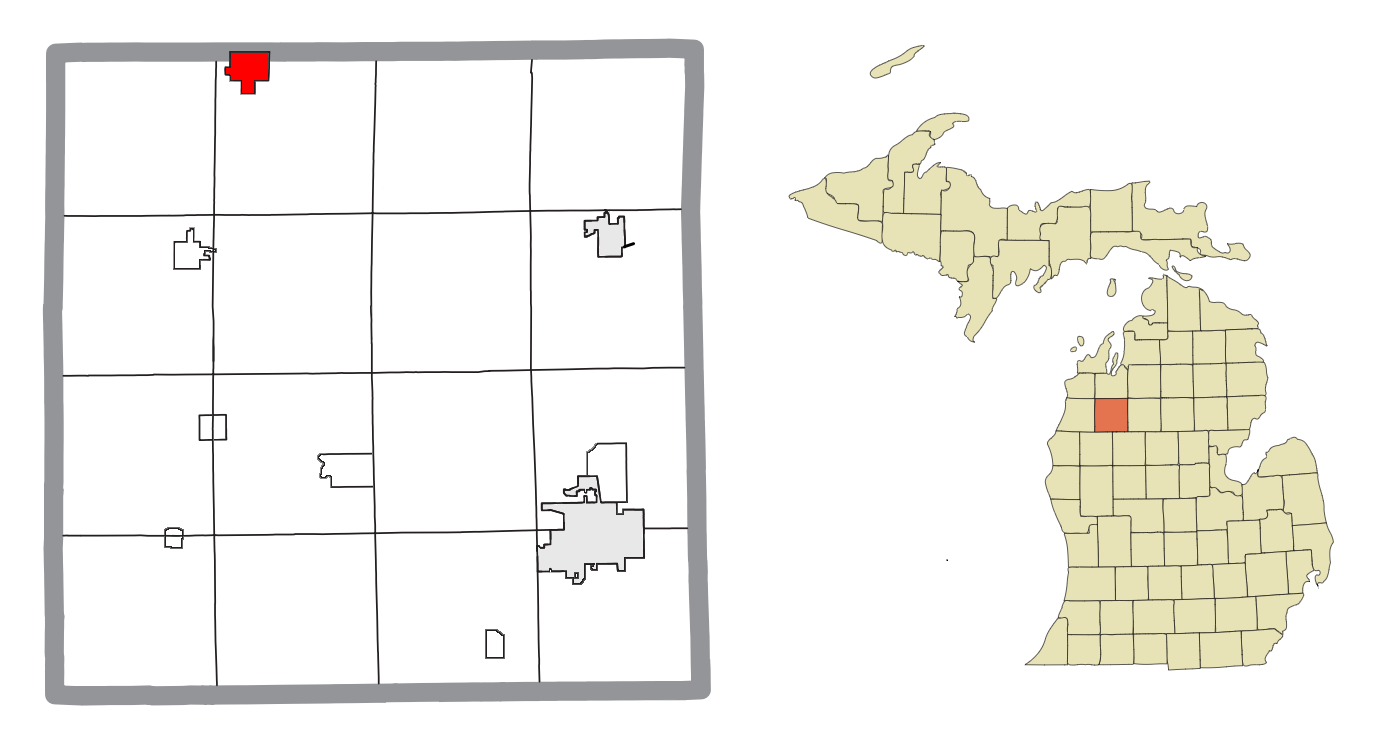
- Location within Wexford County

- Location within the state of Michigan Location within the United States
- Coordinates: 44°30′12″N 85°40′18″W
- Country: United States
- State: Michigan
- County: Wexford
- Founded: 1905
- Incorporated: 1907

Government
  - Type: Village council
  - President: Dennis Kuhn
  - Clerk: Dennis Kuhn II

Area
  - Total: 1.88 sq mi (4.88 km^{2})
  - Land: 1.82 sq mi (4.72 km^{2})
  - Water: 0.066 sq mi (0.17 km^{2})
- Elevation: 1,050 ft (320 m)

Population (2020)
  - Total: 775
  - Density: 425.5/sq mi (164.28/km^{2})
- Time zone: UTC-5 (Eastern (EST))
  - Summer (DST): UTC-4 (EDT)
- ZIP code(s): 49620
- Area code: 231
- FIPS code: 26-11480
- GNIS feature ID: 2397486
- Website: https://villageofbuckley.squarespace.com/

Buckley is a village in Wexford County in the U.S. state of Michigan. The population was 775 at the 2020 census, an increase from 697 at the 2010 census. The village is located within Hanover Township, and lies immediately south of the Grand Traverse County line. The village lies about 6.5 miles (10.5 km) north of Mesick, about 20 miles (32 km) northwest of Cadillac, and about 15 miles (24 km) south of Traverse City.

== History ==
The area that is now Buckley was historically traversed by what is now known as the Old Indian Trail, a trail which connected the Cadillac area to the Traverse City area.

Buckley was originally founded in 1905 as a railroad station operated by the Manistee and North-Eastern Railroad, and the community was named for the local Buckley & Douglas Lumber Company. The Buckley post office was established on March 31, 1906. The community incorporated as a village in 1907.

== Geography ==
According to the U.S. Census Bureau, the village has a total area of 1.84 square miles (4.77 km^{2}), of which 1.78 square miles (4.61 km^{2}) is land and 0.06 square miles (0.16 km^{2}) (3.265) is water.

=== Major highways ===
- M-37 is a north–south thoroughfare that runs through the village.

== Demographics ==
Historical population
Census	Pop.	Note	%±
1910	464		—
1920	352		−24.1%
1930	236		−33.0%
1940	217		−8.1%
1950	194		−10.6%
1960	247		27.3%
1970	244		−1.2%
1980	357		46.3%
1990	402		12.6%
2000	550		36.8%
2010	697		26.7%
2020	775		11.2%
U.S. Decennial Census

=== 2010 census ===
As of the census of 2010, there were 697 people, 246 households, and 175 families residing in the village. The population density was 391.6 inhabitants per square mile (151.2/km^{2}). There were 300 housing units at an average density of 168.5 per square mile (65.1/km^{2}). The racial makeup of the village was 95.3% White, 0.7% African American, 0.9% Native American, 0.1% Asian, 0.9% Pacific Islander, 0.1% from other races, and 2.0% from two or more races. Hispanic or Latino of any race were 2.0% of the population.

There were 246 households, of which 42.7% had children under the age of 18 living with them, 51.6% were married couples living together, 16.7% had a female householder with no husband present, 2.8% had a male householder with no wife present, and 28.9% were non-families. 20.3% of all households were made up of individuals, and 3.6% had someone living alone who was 65 years of age or older. The average household size was 2.83 and the average family size was 3.23.

The median age in the village was 30.2 years. 31.3% of residents were under the age of 18; 8% were between the ages of 18 and 24; 32% were from 25 to 44; 21.4% were from 45 to 64; and 7.2% were 65 years of age or older. The gender makeup of the village was 50.2% male and 49.8% female.

=== 2000 census ===
As of the census of 2000, there were 550 people, 185 households, and 145 families residing in the village. The population density was 309.4 inhabitants per square mile (119.5/km^{2}). There were 212 housing units at an average density of 119.3 per square mile (46.1/km^{2}). The racial makeup of the village was 93.64% White, 0.73% African American, 2.36% Native American, 0.36% Asian, 1.27% from other races, and 1.64% from two or more races. Hispanic or Latino of any race were 3.64% of the population.

There were 185 households, out of which 42.7% had children under the age of 18 living with them, 61.1% were married couples living together, 12.4% had a female householder with no husband present, and 21.1% were non-families. 13.0% of all households were made up of individuals, and 4.9% had someone living alone who was 65 years of age or older. The average household size was 2.94 and the average family size was 3.18.

In the village, the population was spread out, with 31.5% under the age of 18, 10.0% from 18 to 24, 31.5% from 25 to 44, 18.9% from 45 to 64, and 8.2% who were 65 years of age or older. The median age was 31 years. For every 100 females, there were 91.0 males. For every 100 females age 18 and over, there were 94.3 males.

The median income for a household in the village was $36,667, and the median income for a family was $37,212. Males had a median income of $28,750 versus $19,167 for females. The per capita income for the village was $14,258. About 5.2% of families and 7.3% of the population were below the poverty line, including 4.7% of those under age 18 and 13.6% of those age 65 or over.

== Images ==
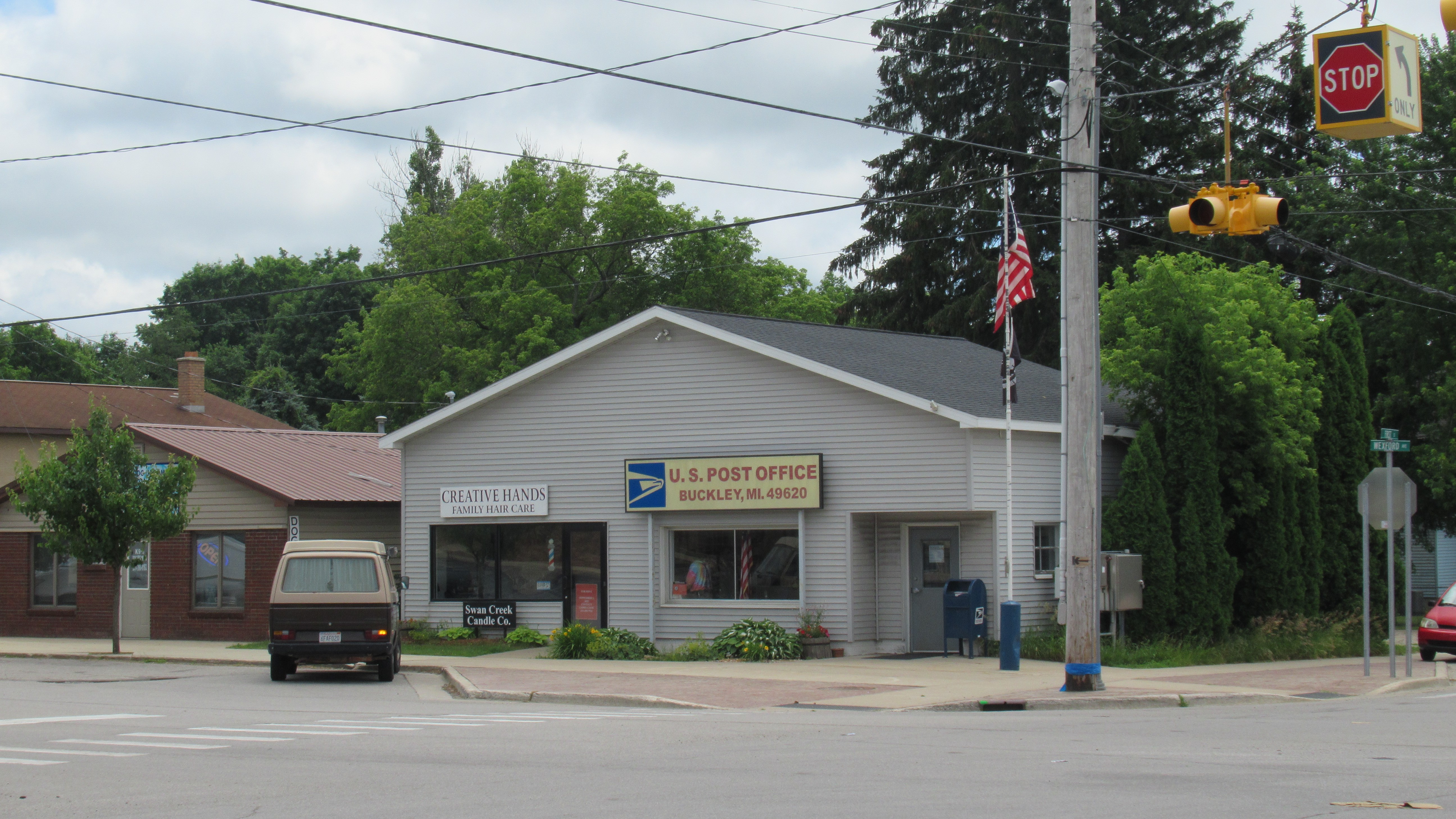
U.S. Post Office in Buckley

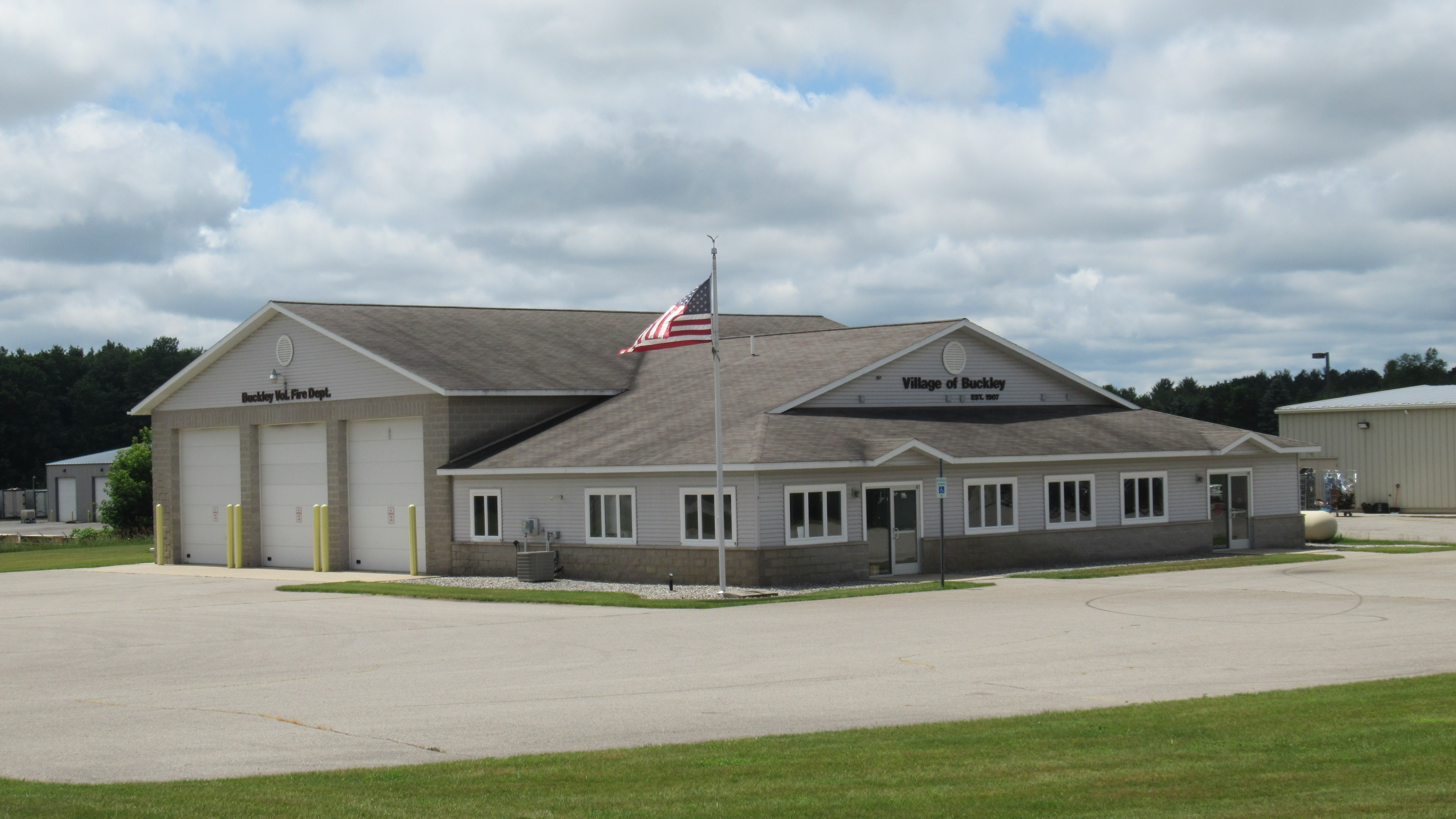
Village offices and fire department
