= M-115 (Michigan highway) =

State highway in Michigan, United States

M-115
- M-115 highlighted in red

Route information
- Maintained by MDOT
- Length: 96.432 mi (155.192 km)
- Existed: c. May 1929–present

Major junctions
- West end: M-22 in Frankfort
- US 31 near Benzonia; M-37 in Mesick; US 131 / M-55 near Cadillac; M-66 / M-61 near Temple; US 10 near Farwell
- East end: Bus. US 127 / Bus. US 10 in Clare

Location
- Country: United States
- State: Michigan
- Counties: Benzie, Manistee, Wexford, Osceola, Clare

Highway system
- Michigan State Trunkline Highway System; Interstate; US; State; Byways
← M-114	→ M-116

M-115 is a state trunkline highway in the northwestern part of the Lower Peninsula of the US state of Michigan. The highway takes a generally southeast-to-northwest direction between Frankfort on Lake Michigan and Clare in the central part of the state. The northwestern end is at M-22 next to Betsie Lake; the southeastern end in downtown Clare is at an intersection with Business US Highway 127 (Bus. US 127) and Bus. US 10. In between, the trunkline runs about 96 1/2 miles (155.3 km) through woodlands, including areas that are a part of either the Manistee National Forest or the Pere Marquette State Forest. The highway also passes agricultural areas, several lakes in the region and a state park near Cadillac.

M-115 was first designated in the 1920s on the northwestern end near Frankfort. Additional, disconnected sections were designed as part of the trunkline in the 1930s near Cadillac, Farwell and Mesick. All but one of these gaps (Cadillac–Mesick) was eliminated by the end of that decade. The remaining segment was built in the 1950s to unite M-115 into a single highway. The last change came in 1989 when the highway was extended into Clare to its current southern terminus.

== Route description ==
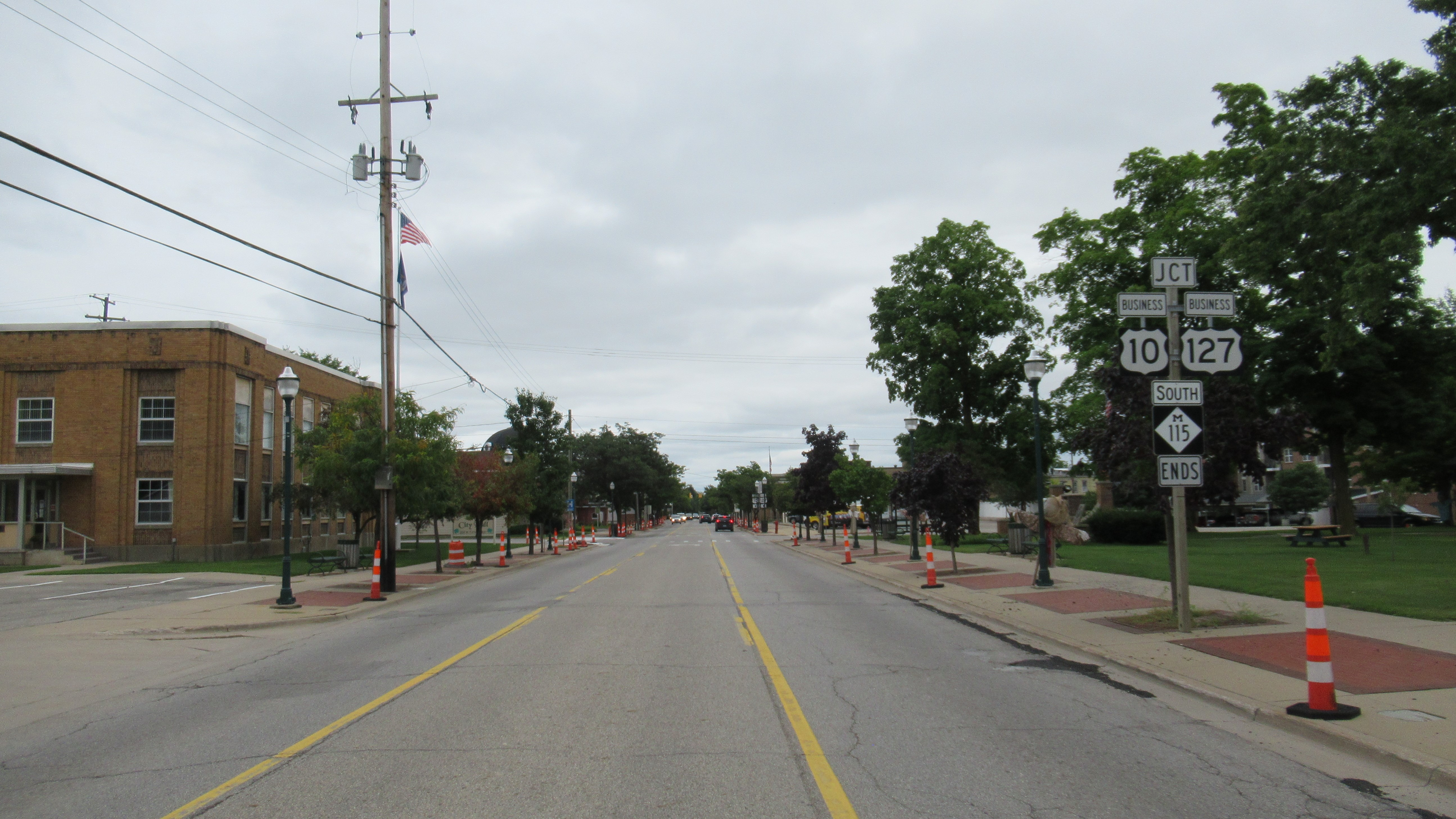
Eastern terminus of M-115 in downtown Clare

M-115 starts in downtown Clare at a four-way intersection with the two business loops, Bus. US 127 and Bus. US 10, in town. From this junction, M-115 runs west following the former routing of US 10 along Ludington Drive to Farwell. In the middle of town, M-115 turns northwesterly to meet the end of the US 10 freeway near Surrey Lake. The highway continues northwest through forest lands and lake country. The trunkline passes into northern Osceola County near its crossing of the Muskegon River. There are intersections with both M-66 and M-61 south of Marion near rural farms. The roadway subsequently crosses into southern Wexford County. Near Stone Lake south of Cadillac, M-115 meets US 131 and M-55. M-55 leaves the US 131 freeway and joins M-115, and the two run concurrently along the western end of Lake Cadillac. They separate near Lake Mitchell, and M-115 turns northwesterly between the two lakes passing Mitchell State Park and the eastern shore of the latter lake.

Past the Cadillac area, M-115 runs through the northeastern corner of the Manistee National Forest. The highway continues through woodlands, passing several small lakes in the area as it approaches the community of Mesick. There it turns due west and joins M-37 through town. After M-37 separates to the south, M-115 crosses the Manistee River and continues its northwestern course. The highway crosses the northeastern corner of Manistee County and runs through the community of Copemish on the way to Benzonia. The landscape here turns more agricultural as the highway skirts southwest of Thompsonville crossing the Betsie River.

After the river crossing, the highway enters Benzie County and runs through the Pere Marquette State Forest. South of Benzonia, M-115 runs concurrently with US 31 into town. The highways separate in the center of town where M-115 turns westward to run along the south shore of Crystal Lake past Frankfort Dow Memorial Field, the local airport near Frankfort. M-115 follows Forest Avenue, and the highway designation ends at the intersection in town with M-22 near Betsie Lake.

The Michigan Department of Transportation (MDOT) maintains M-115 like all other trunkline highways in the state under its jurisdiction. As a part of these responsibilities, the department tracks traffic volumes along its roadways until a metric called average annual daily traffic (AADT). This number is a calculation of the traffic level along a segment of roadway for any average day of the year. In 2009, MDOT determined that the highest traffic levels along M-115 were the 12,079 vehicles daily along the section of highway near lakes Mitchell and Cadillac. The lowest AADT was the 2,236 vehicles near Copemish. The trunkline between the US 10 and M-37 junctions has been listed on the National Highway System. a network of roads important to the country's defense, economy and mobility.

== History ==
In 1929, the first stretch of M-115 was designated from Frankfort to Benzonia. Beginning in the mid-1930s, construction of M-115 began from central to northwestern Lower Michigan. In 1936, an earthen highway was opened between the south side of Cadillac to M-66, with additional sections west of Mesick and northwest of US 10. By the end of the year, the state was paving the earthen section, completed a gravel highway near Mesick and opened an earthen section in Clare County. The section from Copemish to northwest of Mesick was opened as an earthen highway the next year. Construction started in early 1938 to connect Benzonia to Copemish, and before the year was out, the Michigan State Highway Department started work to fill in the gap between M-66 and the highway north of US 10 in Clare County. These two sections were completed as earth-graded highway in 1939. Both discontinuous sections were fully paved by 1945.

In 1953, a county road was built along the path of the future M-115 between Mesick and Cadillac. This road was designated as a state highway by 1957, with a connection along Boon Road north of Cadillac and a concurrency along US 131 to close the gap in 1957. The Boon Road segment was removed the next year when the routing near Lake Mitchell opened. The southern end of M-115 was truncated slightly when the US 10 freeway bypass of Clare was opened in 1975. M-115 has since been rerouted in 1989 along the two-lane Old US 10 from its original southeastern ending point near the US 10 overpass through Farwell to Clare. A roundabout was built for the intersection with northbound M-37 east of Mesick and was opened in September 2013.

== Major intersections ==
County	Location	mi	km	Destinations	Notes
Benzie	Frankfort	0.000	0.000	M-22 / LMCT – Manistee, Empire	
Benzie	Benzonia	6.565	10.565	US 31 north – Traverse City, Petoskey	Northern end of US 31 concurrency
Benzie	Joyfield Township	8.777	14.125	US 31 south – Manistee	Southern end of US 31 concurrency
Manistee	No major junctions				
Wexford	Mesick	31.888	51.319	M-37 south – Baldwin	Western end of M-37 concurrency
Wexford	Springville Township	32.962	53.047	M-37 north – Traverse City	Eastern end of M-37 concurrency; roundabout constructed in 2013
Wexford	Cadillac	50.747	81.669	M-55 west (Lake Mitchell Drive) – Manistee	Western end of M-55 concurrency
Wexford	Clam Lake Township	53.687– 53.706	86.401– 86.431	US 131 / M-55 east – Petoskey, Grand Rapids	Exit 176 on US 131; eastern end of M-55 concurrency
Osceola	Middle Branch Township	70.346	113.211	M-61 east – Harrison	Western terminus of M-61
Osceola	Middle Branch Township	71.580	115.197	M-66 – Marion, Ionia	
Clare	Surrey Township	89.402	143.879	US 10 – Clare, Ludington	Freeway begins on US 10
Clare	Clare	96.432	155.192	Bus. US 127 / Bus. US 10 – Grayling, Midland, Lansing	
1.000 mi = 1.609 km; 1.000 km = 0.621 mi: Concurrency terminus
