= Mesick, Michigan =

- Village
- Village of Mesick
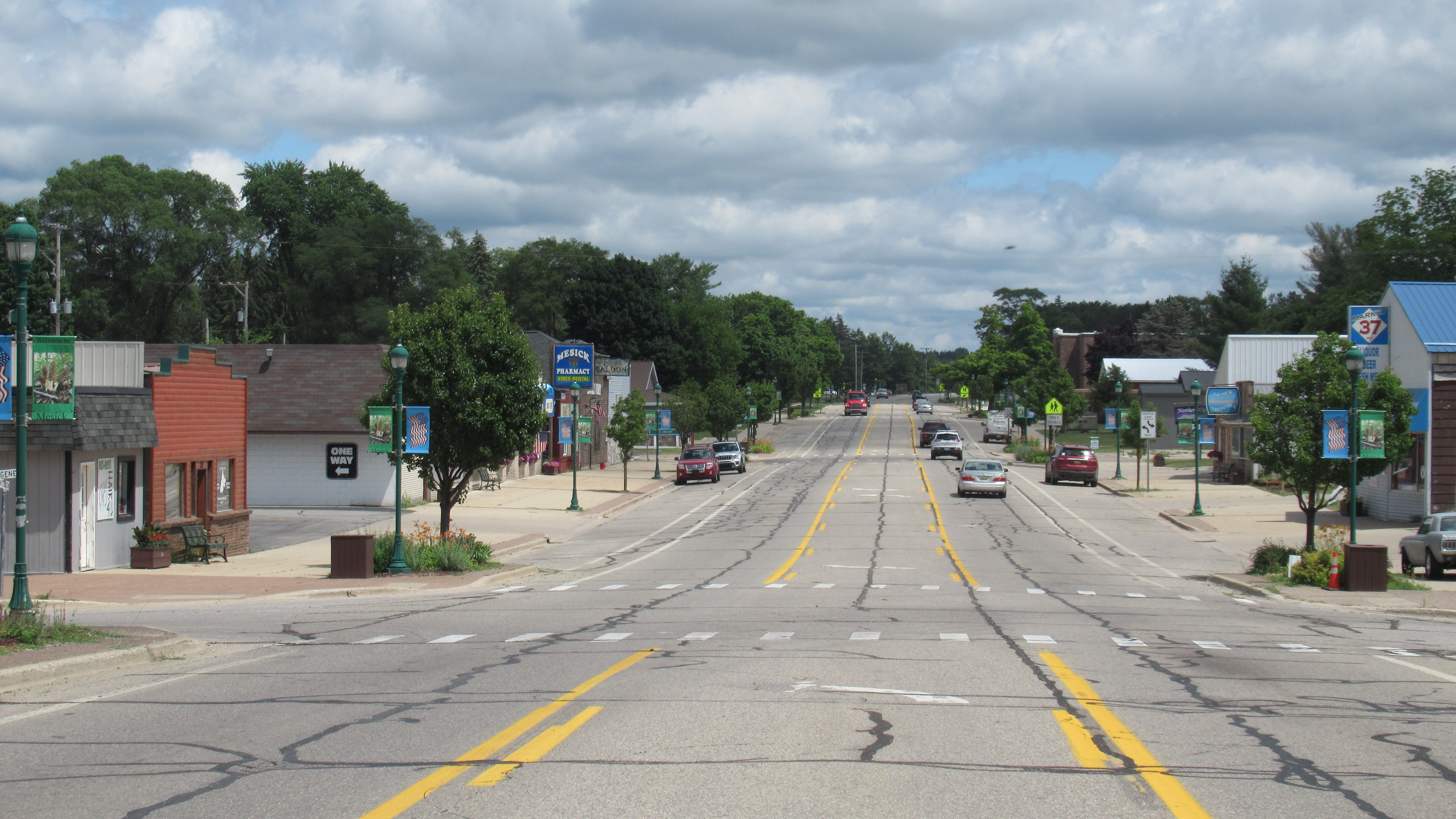
- Looking east along Mesick Avenue (M-37 / M-115)
- Nickname: "The Mushroom Capital"
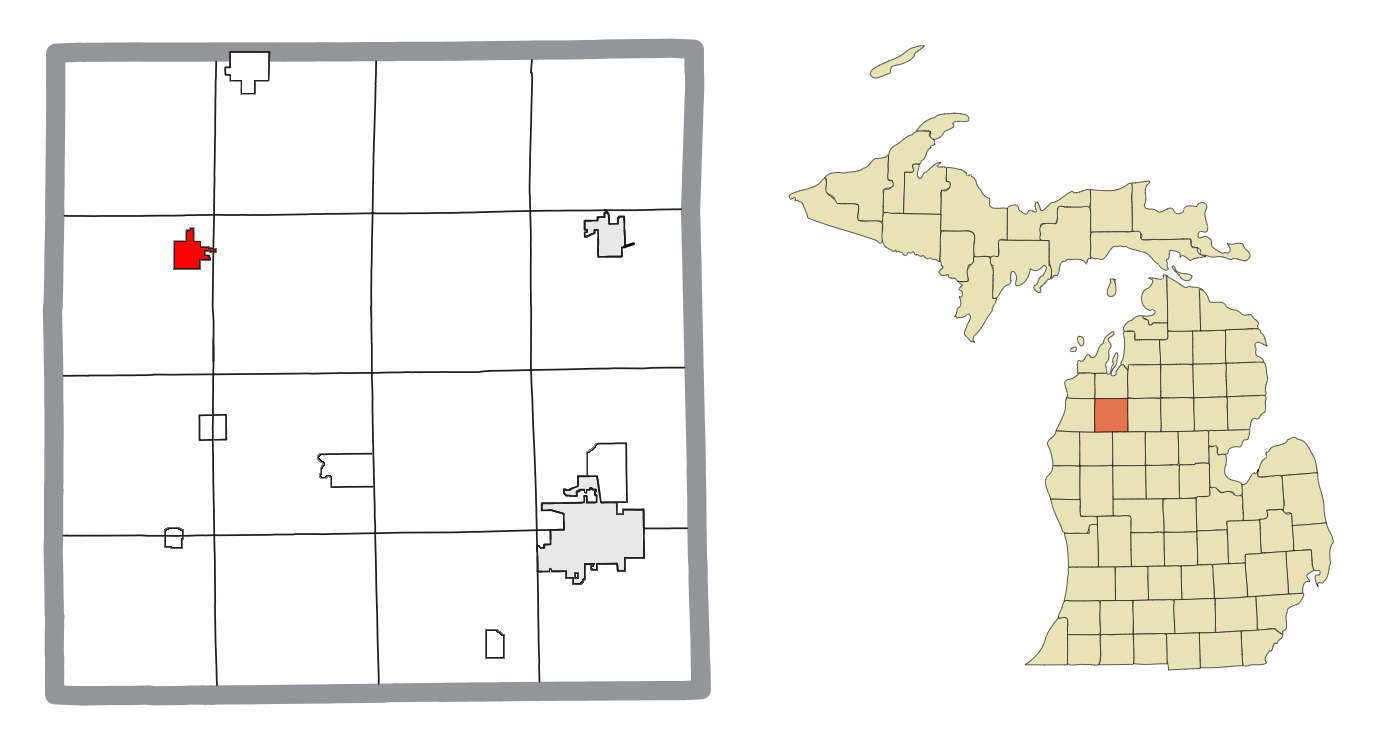
- Location within Wexford County

- Location within the state of Michigan Location within the United States
- Coordinates: 44°24′19″N 85°43′11″W
- Country: United States
- State: Michigan
- County: Wexford
- Townships: Antioch and Springville
- Founded: 1890
- Incorporated: 1901

Government
  - Type: Village council
  - President: David Clous
  - Clerk: Deb Stanton

Area
  - Total: 1.34 sq mi (3.46 km^{2})
  - Land: 1.33 sq mi (3.44 km^{2})
  - Water: 0.0077 sq mi (0.02 km^{2})
- Elevation: 942 ft (287 m)

Population (2020)
  - Total: 397
  - Density: 298.8/sq mi (115.38/km^{2})
- Time zone: UTC-5 (Eastern (EST))
  - Summer (DST): UTC-4 (EDT)
- ZIP code(s): 49668
- Area code: 231
- FIPS code: 26-53320
- GNIS feature ID: 1620798
- Website: Official website

Mesick (/ˈmiːsɪk/ MEE-sik) is a village in Wexford County in the U.S. state of Michigan. The population was 397 at the 2020 census. The majority of the village is located within Springville Township with a very small portion extending east into Antioch Township.

== History ==
Mesick was first settled along the Toledo, Ann Arbor and Northern Michigan Railroad within Springville Township in 1890. The community received a post office on January 9, 1891, with Henry Brooks serving as the first postmaster. Mesick incorporated as a village in 1901.

== Geography ==
According to the U.S. Census Bureau, the village has a total area of 1.34 square miles (3.47 km^{2}), of which 1.33 square miles (3.44 km^{2}) is land and 0.01 square miles (0.03 km^{2}) (0.75%) is water.

Mesick lies in the Manistee River valley. Immediately southeast of Mesick lies Briar Hill, the highest point in Michigan's Lower Peninsula.

=== Major highways ===
- M-37 runs east–west through the center of the village.
- M-115 runs concurrent with M-37 through most of the village.

=== Climate ===
Climate data for Mesick, MI
Month	Jan	Feb	Mar	Apr	May	Jun	Jul	Aug	Sep	Oct	Nov	Dec	Year
Record high °F (°C)	59 (15)	60 (16)	80 (27)	83 (28)	92 (33)	98 (37)	104 (40)	99 (37)	96 (36)	84 (29)	74 (23)	59 (15)	104 (40)
Mean daily maximum °F (°C)	26 (−3)	27 (−3)	36 (2)	52 (11)	65 (18)	75 (24)	80 (27)	78 (26)	69 (21)	57 (14)	41 (5)	30 (−1)	53 (12)
Mean daily minimum °F (°C)	11 (−12)	9 (−13)	18 (−8)	30 (−1)	41 (5)	52 (11)	56 (13)	54 (12)	48 (9)	38 (3)	27 (−3)	17 (−8)	33 (1)
Record low °F (°C)	−43 (−42)	−36 (−38)	−39 (−39)	−12 (−24)	14 (−10)	18 (−8)	31 (−1)	27 (−3)	19 (−7)	10 (−12)	−16 (−27)	−22 (−30)	−43 (−42)
Average precipitation inches (mm)	1.7 (43)	1.6 (41)	1.9 (48)	2.7 (69)	3 (76)	3.1 (79)	2.9 (74)	2.9 (74)	3.5 (89)	2.8 (71)	2.7 (69)	1.7 (43)	30.4 (770)
Average snowfall inches (cm)	18.4 (47)	13 (33)	13.5 (34)	6.7 (17)	0.3 (0.76)	0 (0)	0 (0)	0 (0)	0 (0)	1.1 (2.8)	12 (30)	16.6 (42)	81.6 (207)
Average precipitation days	4.1	3.9	4.7	5.7	6.1	5.7	5.5	5.5	5.7	4.7	4.6	4	60.7
Source: Weatherbase

== Demographics ==
Historical population
Census	Pop.	Note	%±
1910	510		—
1920	318		−37.6%
1930	303		−4.7%
1940	327		7.9%
1950	359		9.8%
1960	304		−15.3%
1970	376		23.7%
1980	374		−0.5%
1990	406		8.6%
2000	447		10.1%
2010	394		−11.9%
2020	397		0.8%
U.S. Decennial Census

=== 2010 census ===
As of the census of 2010, there were 394 people, 161 households, and 103 families living in the village. The population density was 303.1 inhabitants per square mile (117.0/km^{2}). There were 190 housing units at an average density of 146.2 units per square mile (56.4 units/km^{2}). The racial makeup of the village was 96.7% White, 0.3% African American, 1.0% Native American, 0.3% Pacific Islander, 0.8% from other races, and 1.0% from two or more races. Hispanic or Latino of any race were 3.3% of the population.

There were 161 households, of which 35.4% had children under the age of 18 living with them, 37.9% were married couples living together, 18.6% had a female householder with no husband present, 7.5% had a male householder with no wife present, and 36.0% were non-families. 32.3% of all households were made up of individuals, and 17.4% had someone living alone who was 65 years of age or older. The average household size was 2.45 and the average family size was 2.95.

The median age in the village was 37.8 years. 25.9% of residents were under the age of 18; 11% were between the ages of 18 and 24; 24.2% were from 25 to 44; 23.3% were from 45 to 64; and 15.7% were 65 years of age or older. The gender makeup of the village was 49.0% male and 51.0% female.

=== 2000 census ===
As of the census of 2000, there were 447 people, 159 households, and 114 families living in the village. The population density was 392.9 inhabitants per square mile (151.7/km^{2}). There were 185 housing units at an average density of 162.6 units per square mile (62.8 units/km^{2}). The racial makeup of the village was 98.66% White, 0.67% African American, 0.22% Native American, and 0.45% from two or more races. Hispanic or Latino of any race were 1.57% of the population.

There were 159 households, out of which 44.0% had children under the age of 18 living with them, 49.1% were married couples living together, 15.7% had a female householder with no husband present, and 28.3% were non-families. 23.3% of all households were made up of individuals, and 14.5% had someone living alone who was 65 years of age or older. The average household size was 2.81 and the average family size was 3.28.

In the village, the population was spread out, with 33.6% under the age of 18, 9.6% from 18 to 24, 26.8% from 25 to 44, 16.8% from 45 to 64, and 13.2% who were 65 years of age or older. The median age was 32 years. For every 100 females, there were 102.3 males. For every 100 females age 18 and over, there were 83.3 males.

The median income for a household in the village was $24,375, and the median income for a family was $30,000. Males had a median income of $21,136 versus $22,639 for females. The per capita income for the village was $10,600. About 16.3% of families and 21.9% of the population were below the poverty line, including 30.2% of those under age 18 and 17.7% of those age 65 or over.

== Images ==
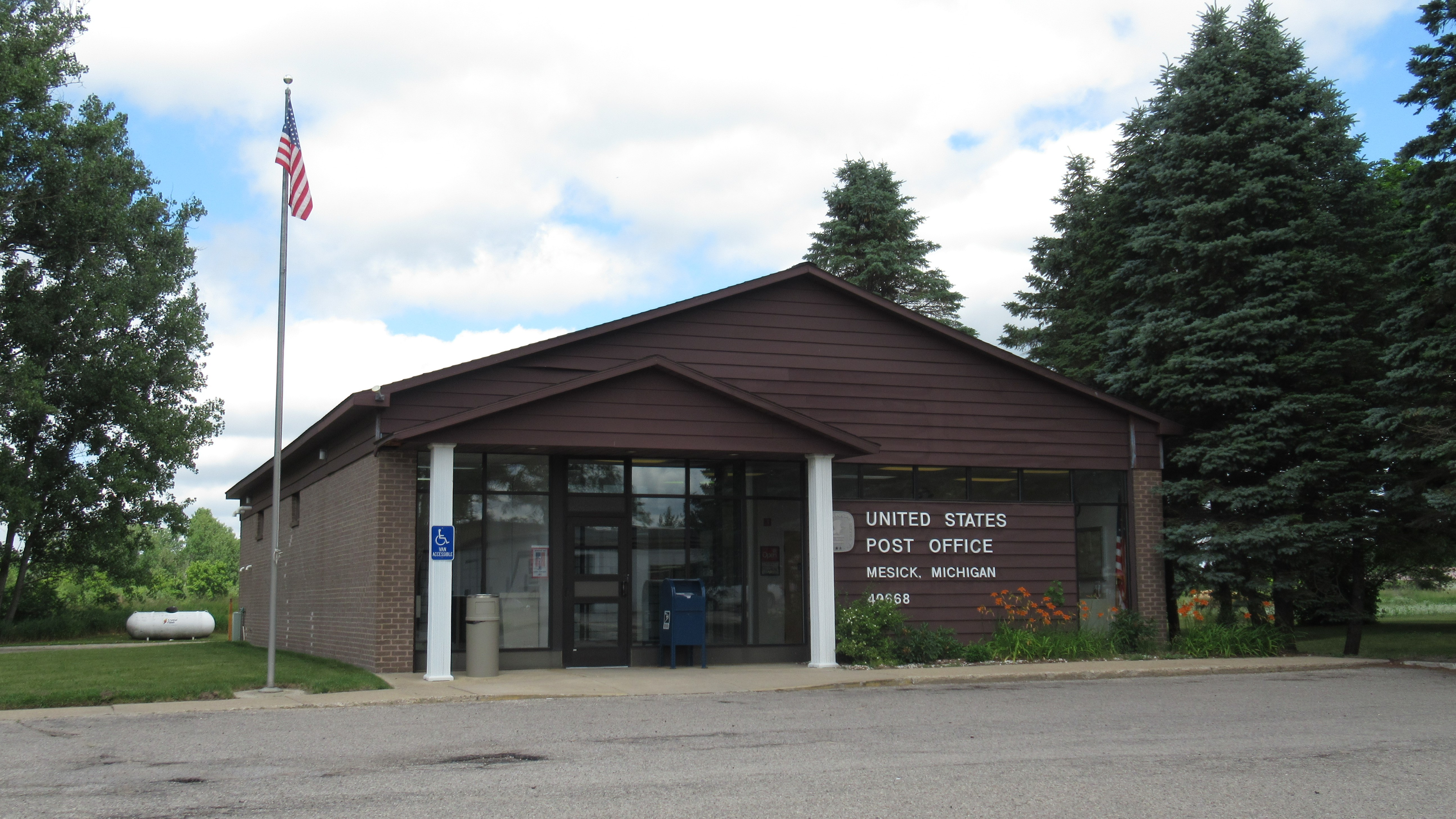
U.S. Post Office in Mesick

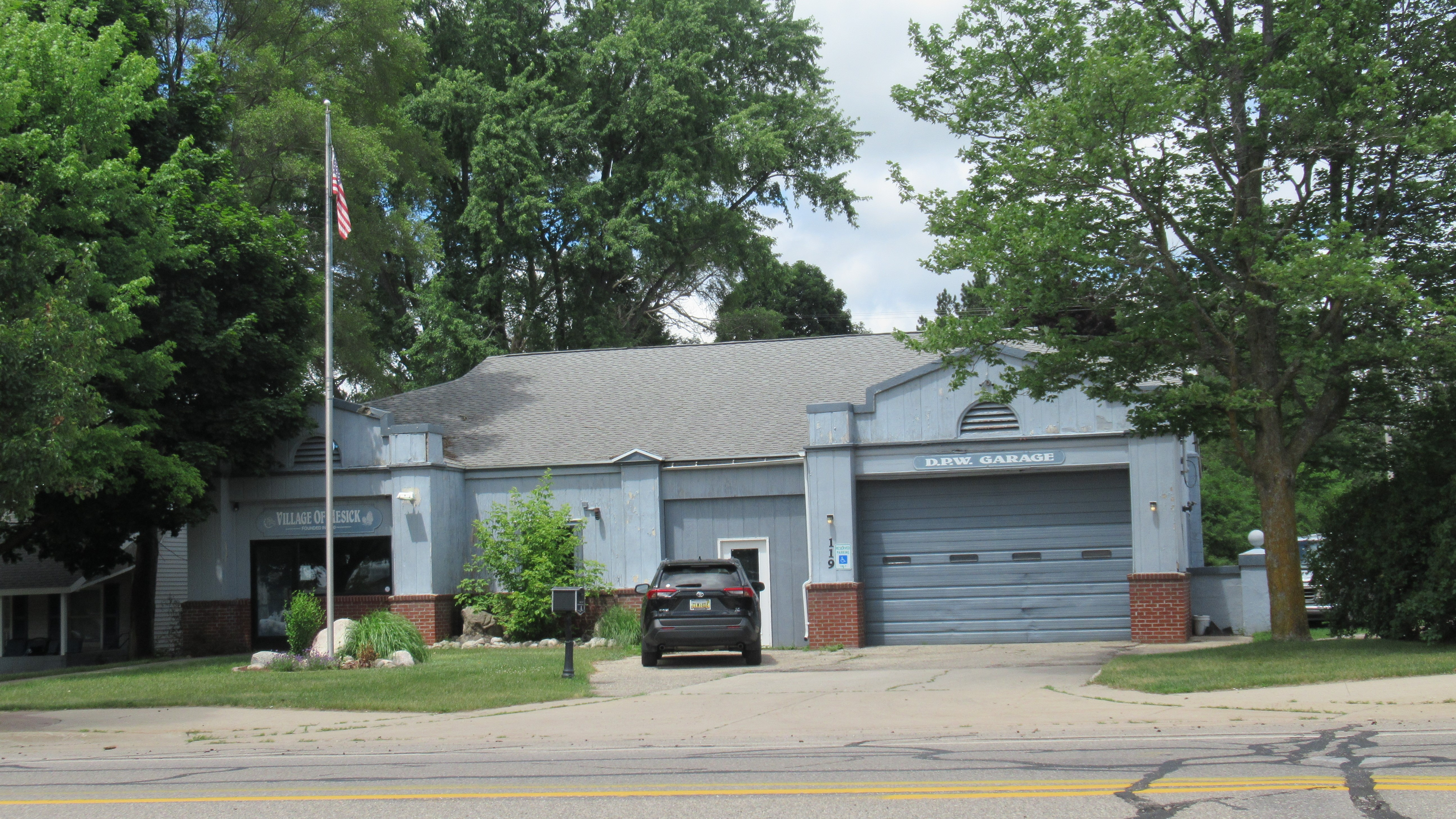
Mesick village office

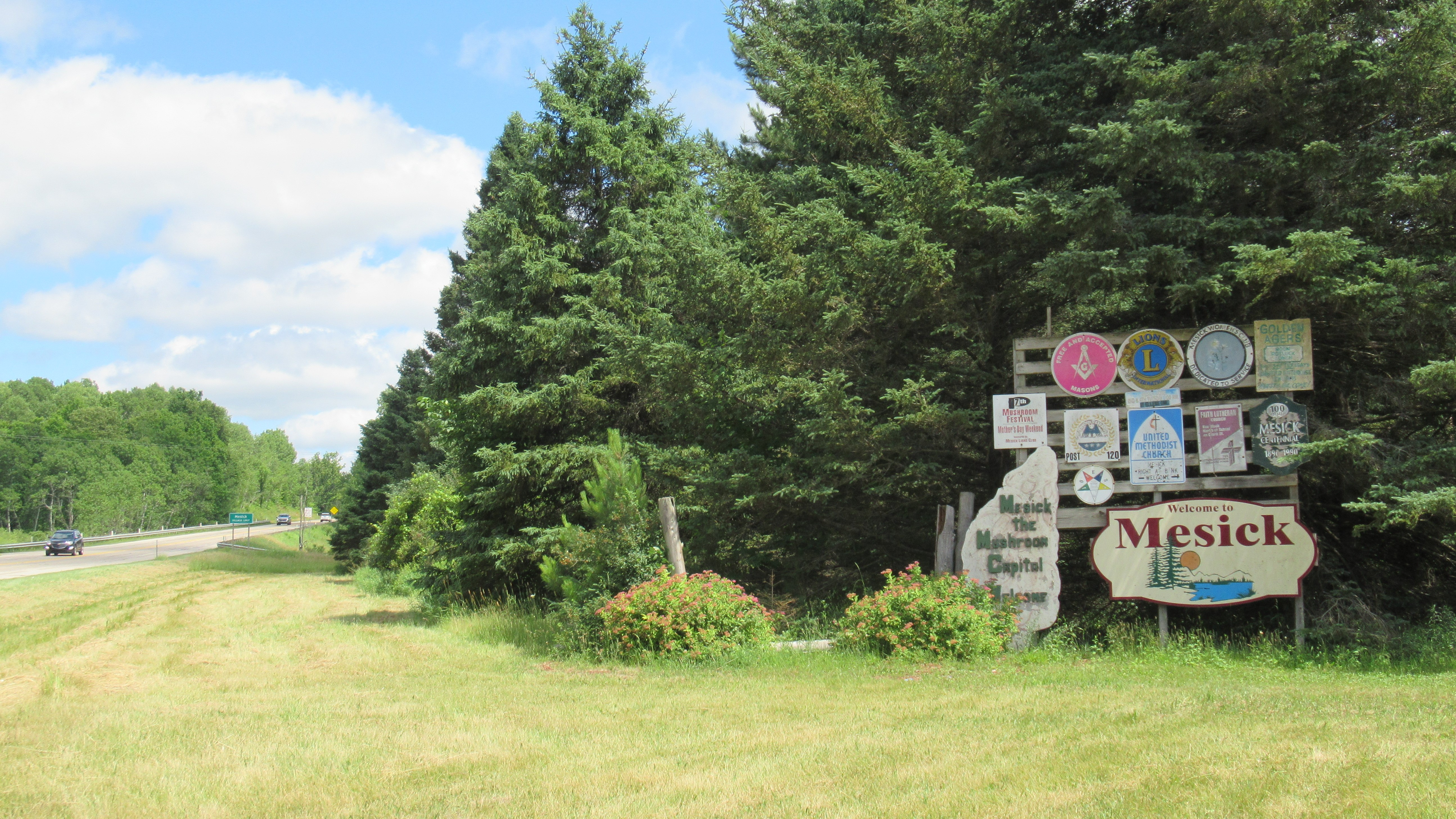
Road signage along M-115
