= List of airports in Michigan =

This is a list of airports in Michigan (a U.S. state), grouped by type and sorted by location. It contains all public-use and military airports in the state. Some private-use and former airports may be included where notable, such as airports that were previously public-use, those with commercial enplanements recorded by the FAA, or airports assigned an IATA airport code.

== Airports ==
This list contains the following information:

- **City served** – The city generally associated with the airport, as per the airport's master record with the Federal Aviation Administration. This is not always the actual location since some airports are located in smaller towns outside of the city they serve. It is not meant to be a complete list of cities served, which can be found in or added to each airport's Wikipedia article.
- **FAA** – The location identifier assigned by the Federal Aviation Administration (FAA). These are linked to each airport's page at the Michigan DOT Airport Directory.
- **IATA** – The airport code assigned by the International Air Transport Association (IATA). Those that do not match the FAA code are shown in bold.
- **ICAO** – The location indicator assigned by the International Civil Aviation Organization (ICAO).
- **Airport name** – The official airport name. Those shown in **bold** indicate the airport has scheduled passenger service on commercial airlines.
- **Role** – One of four FAA airport categories, as per the 2021–2025 National Plan of Integrated Airport Systems (NPIAS) report released September 2020:
  - P-s: Commercial service – primary are publicly owned airports that receive scheduled passenger service and have more than 10,000 passenger boardings (enplanements) each year. Each primary airport is sub-classified by the FAA as one of the following four "hub" types (s):
    - L: Large hub that accounts for at least 1% of total U.S. passenger enplanements.
    - M: Medium hub that accounts for between 0.25% and 1% of total U.S. passenger enplanements.
    - S: Small hub that accounts for between 0.05% and 0.25% of total U.S. passenger enplanements.
    - N: Nonhub that accounts for less than 0.05% of total U.S. passenger enplanements, but more than 10,000 annual enplanements.
  - CS: Commercial service – nonprimary are publicly owned airports that receive scheduled passenger service and have at least 2,500 passenger boardings each year.
  - R: Reliever airports are designated by the FAA to relieve congestion at a large commercial service airport and to provide more general aviation access to the overall community.
  - GA: General aviation airports are the largest single group of airports in the U.S. airport system. They are public-use airports that do not have scheduled service or have scheduled service with less than 2,500 passenger boardings each year.
- **Enplanements** – The number of enplanements (commercial passenger boardings) that occurred at the airport in calendar year 2024, as per FAA records released September 2025.

City served	FAA	IATA	ICAO	Airport name	Role	Enplanements (2024)
				**Commercial service – primary airports**		
Alpena	APN	APN	KAPN	**Alpena County Regional Airport**	P-N	11,150
Detroit	DTW	DTW	KDTW	**Detroit Metro Wayne County Airport**	P-L	16,110,696
Escanaba	ESC	ESC	KESC	**Delta County Airport**	P-N	17,120
Flint	FNT	FNT	KFNT	**Bishop International Airport**	P-N	285,088
Grand Rapids	GRR	GRR	KGRR	**Gerald R. Ford International Airport**	P-S	2,065,053
Hancock	CMX	CMX	KCMX	**Houghton County Memorial Airport**	P-N	25,833
Iron Mountain	IMT	IMT	KIMT	**Ford Airport**	P-N	19,483
Kalamazoo	AZO	AZO	KAZO	**Kalamazoo/Battle Creek International Airport**	P-N	92,510
Lansing	LAN	LAN	KLAN	**Capital Region International Airport** (was Lansing Capital City)	P-N	123,608
Marquette	SAW	**MQT**	KSAW	**Marquette Sawyer Regional Airport**	P-N	44,574
Muskegon	MKG	MKG	KMKG	**Muskegon County Airport**	P-N	2,729
Pellston	PLN	PLN	KPLN	**Pellston Regional/Emmet County Airport**	P-N	31,060
Saginaw	MBS	MBS	KMBS	**MBS International Airport**	P-N	110,822
Sault Ste. Marie	CIU	CIU	KCIU	**Chippewa County International Airport**	P-N	26,482
Traverse City	TVC	TVC	KTVC	**Cherry Capital Airport** (was Cherry County Airpark)	P-N	393,108
				**Commercial service – nonprimary airports**		
Ironwood	IWD	IWD	KIWD	**Gogebic–Iron County Airport**	CS	7,091
Manistee	MBL	MBL	KMBL	**Manistee County Blacker Airport**	CS	6,968
				**Reliever airports**		
Detroit / Grosse Ile	ONZ		KONZ	Grosse Ile Municipal Airport	R	4
Howell	OZW		KOZW	Livingston County Spencer J. Hardy Airport	R	1
New Hudson	Y47			Oakland Southwest Airport (Oakland/Southwest Airport)	R	0
Plymouth / Canton	1D2			Canton-Plymouth-Mettetal Airport (Canton-Plymouth Mettetal Airport)	R	0
Pontiac	PTK	PTK	KPTK	Oakland County International Airport	R	611
Port Huron	PHN	PHN	KPHN	St. Clair County International Airport	R	6
Romeo	D98			Romeo State Airport	R	0
Troy	VLL		KVLL	Oakland/Troy Airport	R	25
				**General aviation airports**		
Adrian	ADG	ADG	KADG	Lenawee County Airport	GA	8
Allegan	35D			Padgham Field	GA	0
Alma	AMN	AMN	KAMN	Gratiot Community Airport	GA	2
Ann Arbor	ARB	ARB	KARB	Ann Arbor Municipal Airport	GA	35
Atlanta	Y93			Atlanta Municipal Airport	GA	0
Bad Axe	BAX		KBAX	Huron County Memorial Airport	GA	4
Battle Creek	BTL	BTL	KBTL	Battle Creek Executive Airport (Kellogg Field)	GA	6
Bay City	3CM			James Clements Municipal Airport	GA	0
Beaver Island (St. James)	SJX		KSJX	**Beaver Island Airport**	GA	0
Bellaire	ACB	ACB	KACB	Antrim County Airport	GA	2
Benton Harbor	BEH	BEH	KBEH	Southwest Michigan Regional Airport	GA	9
Big Rapids	RQB	WBR	KRQB	Roben-Hood Airport	GA	0
Bois Blanc Island	6Y1			Bois Blanc Island Airport (Bois Blanc Airport)	GA	0
Cadillac	CAD	CAD	KCAD	Wexford County Airport	GA	1
Caro	CFS		KCFS	Tuscola Area Airport	GA	0
Charlevoix	CVX		KCVX	**Charlevoix Municipal Airport**	GA	13,565
Charlotte	FPK		KFPK	Fitch H. Beach Airport	GA	0
Cheboygan	SLH		KSLH	Cheboygan County Airport	GA	3
Clare	48D			Clare Municipal Airport	GA	0
Coldwater	OEB		KOEB	Branch County Memorial Airport	GA	5
Detroit	DET	DET	KDET	Coleman A. Young Municipal Airport (was Detroit City)	GA	888
Detroit / Ypsilanti	YIP	YIP	KYIP	Willow Run Airport	GA	4,028
Dowagiac	C91			Dowagiac Municipal Airport	GA	0
Drummond Island	DRM	DRE	KDRM	Drummond Island Airport	GA	0
Evart	9C8			Evart Municipal Airport	GA	0
Frankfort	FKS		KFKS	Frankfort Dow Memorial Field	GA	19
Fremont	FFX		KFFX	Fremont Municipal Airport	GA	3
Gaylord	GLR	GLR	KGLR	Gaylord Regional Airport (Otsego County Airport)	GA	11
Gladwin	GDW	GDW	KGDW	Gladwin Zettel Memorial Airport	GA	0
Grand Haven	3GM			Grand Haven Memorial Airpark	GA	0
Grand Ledge	4D0			Abrams Municipal Airport	GA	0
Grayling	GOV		KGOV	Grayling Army Airfield	GA	0
Greenville	6D6			Greenville Municipal Airport	GA	0
Harbor Springs	MGN		KMGN	Harbor Springs Airport (Harbor Springs Municipal)	GA	40
Hart / Shelby	C04			Oceana County Airport	GA	0
Hastings	9D9			Hastings Airport (was Hastings City/Barry County)	GA	0
Hillsdale	JYM		KJYM	Hillsdale Municipal Airport	GA	1
Holland	BIV		KBIV	West Michigan Regional Airport (was Tulip City Airport)	GA	26
Houghton Lake	HTL	HTL	KHTL	Roscommon County - Blodgett Memorial Airport	GA	7
Ionia	Y70			Ionia County Airport	GA	12
Jackson	JXN	JXN	KJXN	Jackson County Airport (Reynolds Field)	GA	78
Lakeview	13C			Lakeview Airport (Griffith Field)	GA	0
Lambertville	DUH		KDUH	Toledo Suburban Airport	GA	1
Lapeer	D95			Dupont-Lapeer Airport	GA	0
Ludington	LDM	LDM	KLDM	Mason County Airport	GA	9
Mackinac Island	MCD	MCD	KMCD	Mackinac Island Airport	GA	27
Manistique	ISQ	ISQ	KISQ	Schoolcraft County Airport	GA	0
Marlette	77G			Marlette Township Airport	GA	0
Marshall	RMY		KRMY	Brooks Field	GA	0
Mason	TEW		KTEW	Mason Jewett Field	GA	0
Menominee	MNM	MNM	KMNM	Menominee Regional Airport	GA	19
Midland	IKW		KIKW	Jack Barstow Airport (Jack Barstow Municipal)	GA	0
Mio	51M			Oscoda County Dennis Kauffman Memorial Airport	GA	0
Monroe	TTF		KTTF	Custer Airport (Monroe Custer Airport)	GA	3
Mount Pleasant	MOP	MOP	KMOP	Mount Pleasant Municipal Airport	GA	4
Newberry	ERY		KERY	Luce County Airport	GA	0
Niles	3TR	NLE		Jerry Tyler Memorial Airport	GA	0
Ontonagon	OGM		KOGM	Ontonagon County Airport (Schuster Field)	GA	0
Oscoda	OSC	OSC	KOSC	Oscoda-Wurtsmith Airport	GA	4
Owosso	RNP		KRNP	Owosso Community Airport	GA	0
Rogers City	PZQ		KPZQ	Presque Isle County Airport	GA	0
Saginaw	HYX		KHYX	Saginaw County H.W. Browne Airport	GA	4
St. Ignace	83D			Mackinac County Airport	GA	8
Sandusky	Y83			Sandusky City Airport	GA	8
South Haven	LWA		KLWA	South Haven Area Regional Airport	GA	4
Sparta	8D4			Paul C. Miller-Sparta Airport	GA	0
Sturgis	IRS	IRS	KIRS	Kirsch Municipal Airport	GA	20
Three Rivers	HAI	HAI	KHAI	Three Rivers Municipal Dr. Haines Airport	GA	0
West Branch	Y31			West Branch Community Airport	GA	0
White Cloud	42C			White Cloud Airport	GA	0
				**Other public-use airports** (not listed in NPIAS)		
Avoca	39G			Avoca Airport (was Rasor Airport)		
Bad Axe	E53			Engler Field		
Baldwin	7D3			Baldwin Municipal Airport		
Bannister	4M4			Shady Lawn Field (Shady Lawn Farms)		
Bath	41G			University Airpark		
Belleville	43G			Belleville Airport		
Berrien Springs	C20			Andrews University Airpark		
Blissfield	44G			Betz Airport		
Boyne City	N98			Boyne City Municipal Airport		24
Boyne Falls	BFA		KBFA	Boyne Mountain Airport		2
Brighton	45G			Brighton Airport		
Brooklyn	6G8			Shamrock Field		
Carleton	W87			Buzzwick Airport (Buzz Wick Airport) (was Wickenheiser Airport)		
Charlotte	49G			Wend Valley Airport		
Cheboygan	2M7			Hoffman's Black Mountain Aerodrome		
Chesaning	50G			Howard Nixon Memorial Airport		
Clinton	7N4			Honey Acres Airport		
Clio	51G			Alkay Airport		
Corunna	56M			Millstream Airpark		
Croswell	55G			Arnold Field		
Crystal Falls	50D			Iron County Airport		
Dexter	2E8			Cackleberry Airport		
East Jordan	Y94			East Jordan City Airport		
East Tawas	6D9	ECA		Iosco County Airport		
Eastport	59M			Torchport Airport (Torchport Airpark)		
Eaton Rapids	60G			Skyway Estates Airport		
Elwell	68R			Hamp Airport (Hamp Skyport)		
Emmett	2E2			Sharpe's Strip		
Empire	Y87			William B. Bolton Airport		
Flushing	3DA			Dalton Airport		
Fowlerville	65G			Maple Grove Airport		
Frankenmuth	66G			W.M. 'Tiny' Zehnder Field		
Fruitport	39Z			Flying-A-Ranch Airport		
Gaylord	4Y4			Lakes of the North Airport		
Genesee	68G			Duford Field		
Gladwin	5M6			Sugar Springs Airpark		
Grand Marais	Y98			Grand Marais Airport		
Gregory	69G			Richmond Field		
Hale	H80			Field of Dreams Airport		
Harrietta	4Y9			Eagles Landing Airport		
Harrison	80D			Clare County Airport		
Harrisville	5Y0			Harrisville Airport (Harrisville City Airport)		
Harsens Island	Z92			Harsens Island Airport		
Hessel	5Y1			Albert J. Lindberg Airport		22
Hillman	Y95			Hillman Airport		
Houghton Lake Heights	5Y2			Houghton Lake State Airport		
Howell	4Y1			Raether Airport		
Howell	13M			Aeronut Park Balloonport		
Indian River	Y65			Campbell-Pratt Airport		
Interlochen	Y88			Green Lake Airport (Green Lake Township Airport)		
Iron River	Y73			Stambaugh Airport		
Ishpeming	M61			Edward F Johnson Airport		
Jenison	08C			Riverview Airport		
Kalamazoo	4N0			Newman's Airport		
Kalkaska	Y89			Kalkaska City Airport (Kalkaska Airport)		
Kent City	24M			Wilderness Airpark		
Laingsburg	15W			Dennis Farms Airport		
Lake City	Y91			Home Acres Sky Ranch Airport		
Lake Isabella	D15			Lake Isabella - Cal Brewer Memorial Airport (was Lake Isabella Airpark)		
Lewiston	8M8			Garland Airport (Eagle II Airport)		
Lexington	7MI			Flugplatz Airport		
Lincoln	3L7			Milwrick Flying "M" Airport (was Flying "M" Ranch Airport)		
Linden	9G2			Price's Airport		
Lowell	24C			Lowell City Airport		
Luzerne	5Y4			Lost Creek Airport		
Mancelona	D90			Mancelona Municipal Airport		
Manchester	75G			Rossettie Airport		
Marine City	76G			Marine City Airport		
Mecosta	0C5			Canadian Lakes Airport		
Mecosta	27C			Mecosta Morton Airport (Mecosta-Morton Airport)		
Moorestown	6Y0			Moorestown Airpark		
Munising	5Y7			Hanley Field		
Napoleon	3NP			Napoleon Airport		
Napoleon	6H4			Van Wagnen Airport (was Day Field)		
Napoleon	26W			Wolf Lake Airport		
Northport	5D5			Woolsey Memorial Airport		6
Nunica	33C			Jablonski Airport		
Nunica	5N7			Hat Field (Hatfield Airport)		
Parchment	2H4			Triple H Airport		
Paw Paw	2C5			Almena Airport		
Pinconning	52I			Gross Airport		
Plainwell	61D			Plainwell Municipal Airport		
Port Austin	29C			Grindstone Air Harbor Airport		
Pullman	M86			Walle Field (Walle Airfield)		
Ray	57D			Ray Community Airport		
Reed City	RCT	RCT	KRCT	Nartron Field		
Rockford	35C			Wells Airport		
Roscommon	3RC			Roscommon Conservation Airport		
St. Clair	5Y5			David's Landing Airport		
St. Helen	6Y6			St. Helen Airport		
St. Johns	97G			Glowacki Airport		
St. Johns	3S5			Schiffer Acres Airport		
St. Johns	39T			Tripp Creek Airport		
Sandusky	96G			Cowley Field		
Sault Ste. Marie	ANJ		KANJ	Sault Ste. Marie Municipal Airport (Sanderson Field)		29
Schoolcraft	P97			Prairie Ronde Airport		
Sebewaing	98G			Sebewaing Airport (Sebewaing Township Airport)		
Sidnaw	6Y9			Prickett–Grooms Field		
Smiths Creek	11G			Johnson Field		
Stanwood	38C			Cain Field		
Sunfield	C43			Hiram Cure Airfield		
Tecumseh	34G			Merillat Airport		
Tecumseh	3TE			Al Meyers Airport (was Meyers-Diver's Airport)		
Thompsonville	7Y2			Thompsonville Airport		
Topinabee	Y30			Pbeaaye Airport		
Traverse City	4M0			Lake Ann Airway Estates Airport		
Watervliet	40C			Watervliet Municipal Airport		
Wayland	41C			Calkins Field		
Weidman	D11			Ojibwa Airpark		
Westphalia	3F5			Forest Hill Airport		
Williamston	89Y			Maidens Airport		
Winn	53W			Woodruff Lake Airport		
Yale	48G			Gavagan Field		
Yale	4Y8			Para Field		
Yale	D20			Yale Airport		
Zeeland	Z98			Ottawa Executive Airport		
				**Other military airports**		
Mount Clemens	MTC	MTC	KMTC	Selfridge ANGB		228
Traverse City				CGAS Traverse City (at Cherry Capital Airport)		
				**Notable private-use airports**		
Ada	2MI5			Somerville Airport (public use in 2005, FAA: 34I)		
Albion	42MI			Midway Airport (public use in 2002, FAA: 35G)		
Athens	77MI			David's Airport (David's Field) (public use in 2007, FAA: 9C2)		
Beaver Island	6Y8			**Welke Airport**		14,584
DeWitt	MI10			Hoerner's Corners Airport		
Gladstone	43MI			West Gladstone Airport (public use in 2003, FAA: 9C9)		
Lewiston	MI55			Twin Lakes Airport		
St. Johns	MI28			Archer Memorial Field		
St. Johns	82MI			Randolph's Landing Area (Randolph's Airport) (public use in 2008, FAA: 61G)		
Traverse City				Traverse Area Model Pilots Society (TRAMPS) Aerodrome		
Vassar	2MI8			Vassar Field (former public use, FAA: 4P4)		
Watersmeet	72MI			Northwoods Airport		
				**Notable former airports**		
Acme				Acme Skyport (closed 1995?)		
Avoca	~~07D~~			Tackaberry Airport (closed 2010?)		
Baraga	~~2P4~~			Baraga Airport		
Carson City	~~47G~~			Mayes Airport (closed 2008?)		
Davison	~~6G0~~			Athelone Williams Memorial Airport		
Dearborn				Ford Airport (closed 1947)		
Deckerville	~~56G~~			Indian Creek Ranch Airport		
East Lansing	~~2D8~~			Davis Airport (closed 2000)		
Elk Rapids	34U			Yuba Airport (closed indefinitely, FAA record still active)		
Erie	~~M84~~			Erie Aerodrome (closed 2010?)		
Grant	~~01C~~			Grant Airport		
Gregory	~~35L~~			Carriage Lane Airport (closed 2007?)		
Holland	~~HLM~~	~~HLM~~	~~KHLM~~	Park Township Airport		4
Kalamazoo	~~09C~~			Austin Lake Airport (closed 2001?)		
Marquette	~~MQT~~		~~KMQT~~	Marquette County Airport (closed 1999)		
Mason				Craft's Field		
New Lothrop	~~6B3~~			Bean Blossom Airport (closed 2008?)		
Onaway	~~Y96~~			Leo E. Goetz County Airport (closed permanently ~2015-2018)		
Onsted	~~MI51~~			Loar's Field (public use in 2006, FAA: 83G)		
Petersburg	~~88G~~			Gradolph Field		
Rock	~~MI00~~			Bonnie Field (public use in 2008, FAA: 6Y4)		
Rothbury	~~42N~~			Double JJ Resort Ranch Airport (closed 2008?)		
Standish	~~Y75~~			Standish Industrial Airport (closed 2006?)		
Traverse City	~~Y04~~			Sugar Loaf Resort Airport (Wallace G. Fryer Airfield)		
Traverse City				Traverse City Ransom Field (closed 1969)		

== See also ==
- Essential Air Service
- List of airports in Michigan's Upper Peninsula
- List of defunct airports in the United States
- Wikipedia:WikiProject Aviation/Airline destination lists: North America#Michigan
