= Cackleberry =

Cackleberry may refer to:

- a chicken's egg
- Cackleberry Airport, Dexter, Michigan, United States
