= Hastings Airport =

Hastings Airport may refer to:

- Hastings Airport (Michigan) in Hastings, Michigan, United States
- Hastings Airport (Pasadena) in Pasadena, California, United States
- Hastings Airport (Sierra Leone) in Freetown, Sierra Leone
- Hastings Aerodrome in Hastings, Hawke's Bay, New Zealand
- Hastings Municipal Airport in Hastings, Nebraska, United States
