= Oakland Airport (disambiguation) =

Oakland Airport most commonly refers to:

- Oakland San Francisco Bay Airport (IATA: OAK), Oakland, California
  - Oakland International Airport station, rapid transit station at the airport

Oakland Airport may also refer to:

- Oakland County International Airport (IATA: PTK), Waterford Township, Michigan
- Oakland Southwest Airport (FAA: Y47), Oakland County, Michigan
- Oakland-Troy Airport (IATA: VLL), Troy, Michigan
