= Johnson Field =

Johnson Field may refer to:

== Sports stadiums ==
- Johnson Field (stadium), officially LaRee and LeGrand Johnson Field, a stadium at Utah State University
- Johnson Field (Binghamton), a baseball stadium that was located in Binghamton, New York. Johnson Field was torn down to help construct New York State Route 17
- Johnson Field (Yale), a field hockey facility in New Haven, Connecticut on the campus of Yale University
- Old Bailey Stadium, formerly "Johnson Field", a now-demolished football stadium at Presbyterian College in South Carolina

== Airfields ==
- Johnson Field (Michigan), an airport in Smiths Creek, Michigan, United States
- Johnson Field (North Carolina), an airport in Archdale, North Carolina, United States
- Delaware County Airport, also known as Johnson Field, in Muncie, Indiana, United States
- Johnson Field, Japan, later Johnson Air Base; the name of Iruma Air Base when operated by the United States Air Force
