= Marlette Township Airport =

Public Airport in Marlette, Michigan

Coordinates: 43.31183°N 83.09092°W

Marlette Township Airport is a public use airport located one mile southwest of Marlette, Michigan, United States. The airport is publicly owned by Marlette Township.

== Facilities and aircraft ==
The airport has two hard-surface runways. Runway 10/28 measures 3795 x 75 ft (1157 x 23 m), and runway 1/19 measures 3500 x 75 ft (1067 x 23 m).

The airport has a fixed-base operator (FBO) with avgas available for general aviation. A lounge, restrooms, and a weather briefing station are also available.

For the period ending December 31, 2021, the airport averaged 27 aircraft operations per day, or about 10,000 per year. All of this traffic is general aviation, split evenly between transient and local traffic. For the same time period, there were 40 aircraft based on the field: 34 single-engine and 4 multi-engine airplanes as well as 2 gliders.

== Accidents and incidents ==
- On August 4, 2001, a Blanik L-13 glider impacted terrain during an initial takeoff run at Marlette. A hook on the harness attaching the aircraft to its tow plane uncommanded. The imbalance in the glider's center of gravity forced the plane to yaw left toward a ditch. The crew applied full right aileron and rudder but was unable to stop the aircraft from impacting trees. The flight was operating as an instructional flight. The instructor onboard received serious injuries, but the student was uninjured. The probable cause was found to be the ground crew's improper connection of the two winch cables prior to takeoff, causing one side of the winch cable to come disconnected.

== See also ==
- List of airports in Michigan
