= Rossettie Airport =

Public use airport in Michigan, US

- IATA: none; ICAO: none; FAA LID: 75G

Summary
- Owner/Operator: AUGUST M ROSSETTIE
- Location: Manchester, MI
- Time zone: UTC−05:00 (-5)
  - Summer (DST): UTC−04:00 (-4)
- Elevation AMSL: 1,005 ft / 306 m
- Coordinates: 42°11′42″N 084°01′51″W
- Interactive map of Rossettie Airport

Runways
Direction	Length		Surface
Direction	ft	m	Surface
18/36	2,480	756	Turf

Statistics (2021)
- Aircraft Movements: 504

Rossettie Airport (FAA LID: 75G) is a privately owned, public use airport located 3 miles north of Manchester, Michigan. The airport sits on 13 acres and is at an elevation of 1005 feet.

The airport is home to the University of Michigan Gliding and Soaring Club.

== Facilities and aircraft ==
The airport has one runway, designated as 18/36, that is turf. It measures 2480 x 100 ft (756 x 30 m). For the 12-month period ending December 31, 2021, the airport had 504 aircraft operations, an average of 42 per month. It consisted entirely of general aviation. For the same time period, 13 aircraft are based at the airport: 7 single-engine airplanes and 6 ultralights.

The airport does not have a fixed-base operator, but fuel is available for aircraft.

== Accidents and incidents ==
- On July 1, 2000, a Schleicher K 8B operated by the University of Michigan Gliding and Soaring Club crashed while landing at Rossettie Airport. While on final approach the glider experienced higher than expected sink and the glider impacted a fence-post short of the runway. The probable cause of the accident was found to be the downdraft experienced during final approach and altitude/clearance from the fence post not being maintained by the pilot.
- On August 1, 2008, a Prendergast RV-7A's landing gear bended during landing at Rossettie Airport. The pilot reported that during landing he let the "nose come down and used brakes which caused the low clearance gear leg to dig in and begin bending." The airplane's propeller and wing subsequently contacted the "undulating" grass strip. The pilot reported no mechanical malfunctions with the airplane during the accident flight. The probable cause was found to be the pilot's inadequate flare during landing.
- On May 26, 2019, a powered parachute crashed near the airport. The pilot aboard received injuries.

== See also ==
- List of airports in Michigan
