= Sandusky City Airport =

Public-use airport in Michigan, United States

- IATA: none; ICAO: none; FAA LID: Y83

Summary
- Airport type: Public
- Owner: City of Sandusky
- Serves: Sandusky, Michigan
- Location: Near Sandusky, Michigan
- Elevation AMSL: 776.9 ft / 237 m
- Coordinates: 43°27′24.19″N 82°50′4.01″W
- Website: Sandusky, MI: Airport

Map
- Location of airport in Michigan, United States Y83 (the United States)

Runways
Direction	Length		Surface
Direction	ft	m	Surface
09/27	3,499	1,066	Asphalt
18/36	2,271	692	Turf

Statistics (2020)
- Aircraft operations: 6,200
- Based aircraft: 22
- Source: Federal Aviation Administration

The Sandusky City Airport (FAA LID: Y83) is a public-use airport located three miles north of the city of Sandusky, Michigan. The airport is publicly owned by the city.

In 2009, the airport was the scene of a federal drug smuggling investigation after marijuana and ecstasy worth over $1 million were flown in from Canada. The case resulted in multiple convictions for Canadian nationals who had flown the plane to the United States.

== Facilities and aircraft ==
The airport has two runways. Runway 9/27 is 3499 x 75 ft (1066 x 23 m) and is asphalt, while runway 18/36 is 2271 x 153 ft (692 x 47 m) and is turf.

The airport has seen recent upgrades to its runway, taxiways, instrument approaches, and terminal, and it has seen the construction of numerous new hangars as well. In 2017, the airport received funding from a private investor to build a multi-purpose heated storage building to house larger aircraft on airport property and serve as home for the airport's FBO.

The airport has a fixed-base operator which sells fuel and offers amenities such as a lounge and a flight planning kiosk.

For the 12-month period ending December 31, 2020, the airport had 6,188 operations, an average of 119 per week. It was composed entirely of general aviation. For the same time period, there were 22 aircraft based on the field, all single-engine airplanes.

== Accidents and incidents ==
- On August 10, 2016, a Piper J5C impacted a ditch after landing at Sandusky City. The aircraft departed runway 18 and intended to return for a landing on runway 36, the same surface as the takeoff runway but in the opposite direction. The pilot reported the landing on runway 36 was normal, but the aircraft veered to the right and impacted a ditch. The passenger onboard reported the aircraft bounced and became airborne two or three times and then veered right. The aircraft gained altitude and then dropped into the ditch. The probable cause was found to be the pilot's improper landing flare, which resulted in a bounced landing, and a subsequent loss of control followed by a runway excursion.
- On August 30, 2020, a Piper PA-28 Archer II experienced a runway overrun subsequent to a passenger onboard retarding the throttle during a takeoff attempt at Sandusky City Airport.

== See also ==
- List of airports in Michigan
