= Howard Nixon Memorial Airport =

Public use airport in Chesaning, Michigan

- IATA: none; ICAO: none; FAA LID: 50G

Summary
- Owner/Operator: VILLAGE OF CHESANING, MI
- Time zone: UTC−05:00 (-5)
  - Summer (DST): UTC−04:00 (-4)
- Elevation AMSL: 641 ft / 195.4 m
- Coordinates: 43°10′48″N 084°07′50″W
- Interactive map of Howard Nixon Memorial Airport

Runways
Direction	Length		Surface
Direction	ft	m	Surface
9/27	2,800	853	Turf
18/36	2,582	787	Turf

Statistics (2020)
- Aircraft Movements: 3,380

The Howard Nixon Memorial Airport (FAA LID: 50G) is a publicly owned, public use airport located 1 mile west of Chesaning, Michigan. The airport sits on an elevation of 641 ft (195 m).

== History ==
The Chesaning Airport was established in 1946 when land was purchased by private individuals and industry from a local farmer. These private citizens turned over the land to the Village of Chesaning under the condition that it be used for an airport. More land was purchased in 1963 for airport expansion. The north–south runway was lighted with state funds, and work on the east–west runway began.

The Chesaning Airport Development Corporation was formed in 1980 to further airport development.

The airport was renamed in honor of longtime manager Howard Nixon in 1987.

== Facilities and aircraft ==
The airport has two runways, both of which are made of turf. Runway 9/27 is 2800 x 150 ft (853 x 46 m). Runway 18/36 is 2582 x 150 ft (787 x 46 m).

The airport does not have a fixed-base operator, and no fuel is available.

For the 12-month period ending December 31, 2020, the airport has 3,380 airport operations per year, an average of 65 per week. It is entirely general aviation. For the same time period, there are 17 aircraft based on the field, all single-engine airplanes.

== Airport events ==
Among other clubs, the airport is home to the Chesaning Aero Club, believed to be the second-oldest flying club that's still active in the state of Michigan.

The airport is home to regular events such as an annual fly-in breakfasts. Both pilots and aviation enthusiasts gather to eat and tour aircraft. The airport also plays host to the Chesaning gun show.

== Accidents and incidents ==
- On September 18, 2000, a Piper PA-16 was substantially damaged when it impacted the ground in a nose low attitude after hitting a tree while on final approach for landing. The aircraft had been conducting touch-and-gos at the Howard Nixon Memorial Airport. The probable cause of the accident was found to be the pilot's failure to maintain clearance from the trees.
- On October 29, 2008, a Beechcraft Musketeer sustained substantial damage while attempting to land at the Howard nixon Memorial Airport. Shortly after touchdown the airplane ballooned when it encountered a wind gust. The airplane yawed to the right and impacted the ground as the pilot attempted to recover. The nose and left main landing gear collapsed during the subsequent collision with terrain. The probable cause was found to be the pilot's failure to adequately compensate for the gusting wind conditions during landing.

== See also ==
- List of airports in Michigan
