= Albert J. Lindberg Airport =

Airport in Michigan, United States

- IATA: none; ICAO: none; FAA LID: 5Y1

Summary
- Airport type: Public
- Owner: Town of Clark Township
- Serves: Clark Township, Michigan
- Elevation AMSL: 760 ft (230 m)
- Coordinates: 46°02′09″N 084°25′25″W

Map
- Location of airport in Michigan 5Y1 (the United States)

Runways
Direction	Length		Surface
Direction	ft	m	Surface
9/27	3,700	1,128	Asphalt

Statistics (2018)
- Aircraft operations: 250
- Based aircraft: 7
- Source: Federal Aviation Administration

Albert J. Lindberg Airport (FAA LID: 5Y1) is a town owned public use airport located 2 miles (3 km) south of the central business district of Clark Township, a town in Mackinac County, Michigan, United States.

Although most U.S. airports use the same three-letter location identifier for the FAA and IATA, this airport is assigned 5Y1 by the FAA but has no designation from the IATA.

== Facilities and aircraft ==
Albert J. Lindberg Airport covers an area of 160 acres (65 ha) at an elevation of 760 feet (232 m) above mean sea level. It has one runway: 9/27 is 3,700 by 60 feet (1,128 x 18 m) with an asphalt surface.

The airport has a fixed-base operator that sells both 100LL and JetA aviation fuel.

For the 12-month period ending December 31, 2018, the airport had 250 aircraft operations, an average of 21 per month: all general aviation. For the same time period, there were 7 aircraft based at the field, all single-engine airplanes.

== Accidents and incidents ==
- On April 2, 2020, a small aircraft crashed at the airport after experiencing a strong crosswind while landing. The plane impacted a snow bank and came to rest in a nose-forward attitude.

== See also ==
- List of airports in Michigan
- List of airports in Michigan's Upper Peninsula
