= Honey Acres Airport =

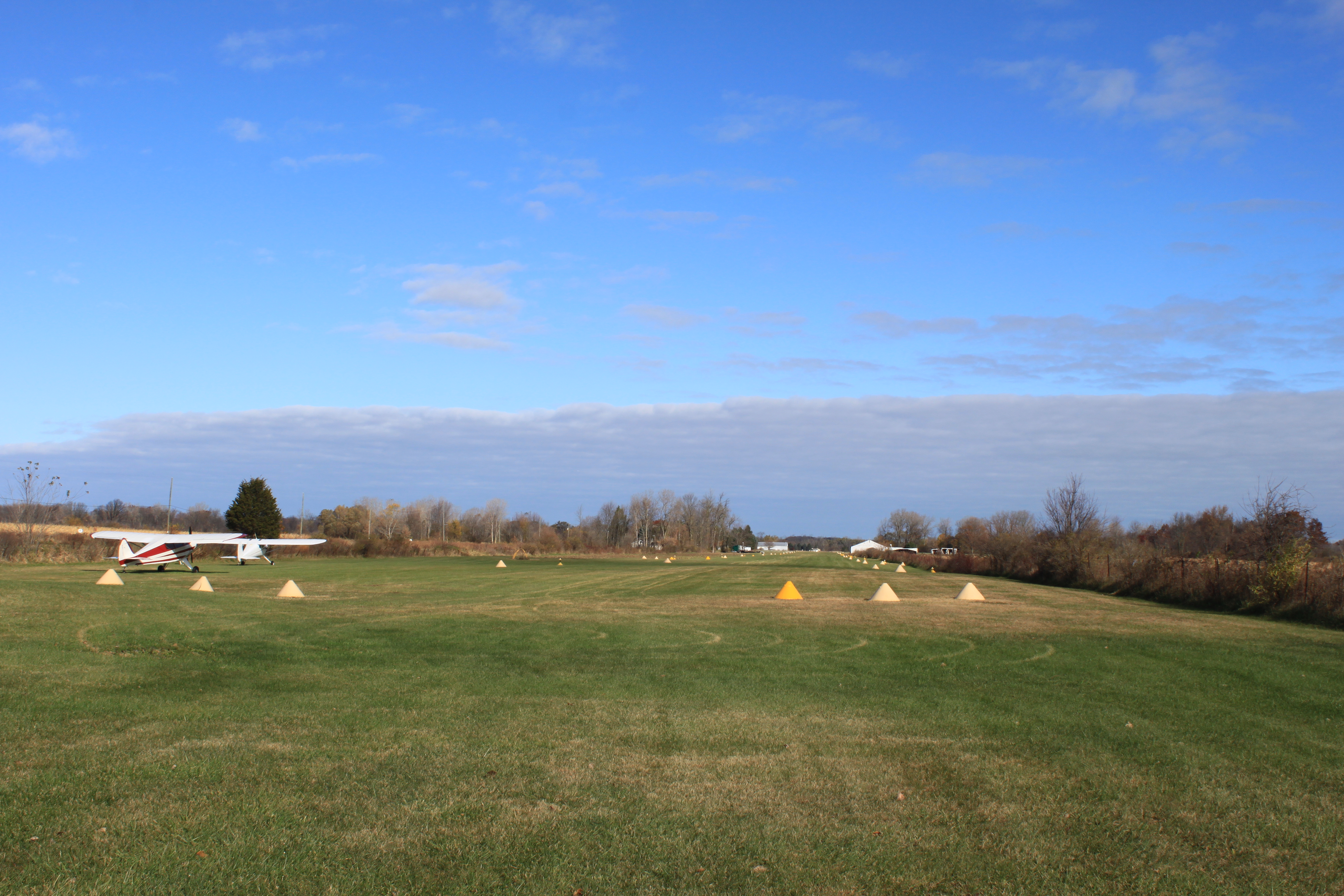
- Runway viewed from Michigan Ave.
- IATA: none; ICAO: none; FAA LID: 7N4

Summary
- Airport type: Public
- Owner: Sharon A. Kussmaul Trust
- Operator: Richard R. & Jayce R. Kussmaul
- Serves: Clinton, Michigan
- Time zone: UTC−05:00 (-5)
  - Summer (DST): UTC−04:00 (-4)
- Elevation AMSL: 820 ft / 250 m
- Coordinates: 42°04′40.15″N 83°59′9.8″W
- Interactive map of Honey Acres Airport

Runways
| Direction | Length | | Surface |
| Direction | ft | m | Surface |
|---|---|---|---|
| 18/36 | 3,800 | 1,158 | TURF |

Statistics (2017)
- Aircraft Movements: 1200
- Based Aircraft: 1
- Source: FAA Airports GIS

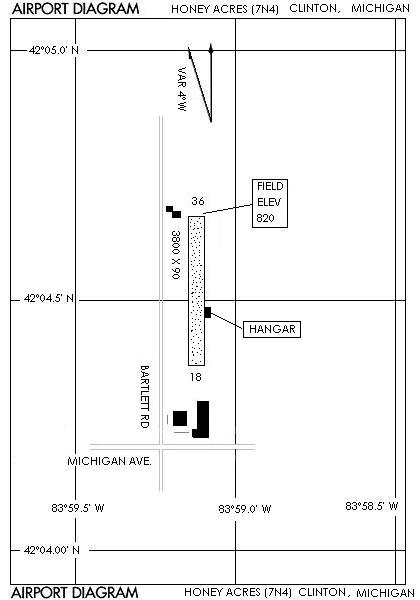
Airport diagram

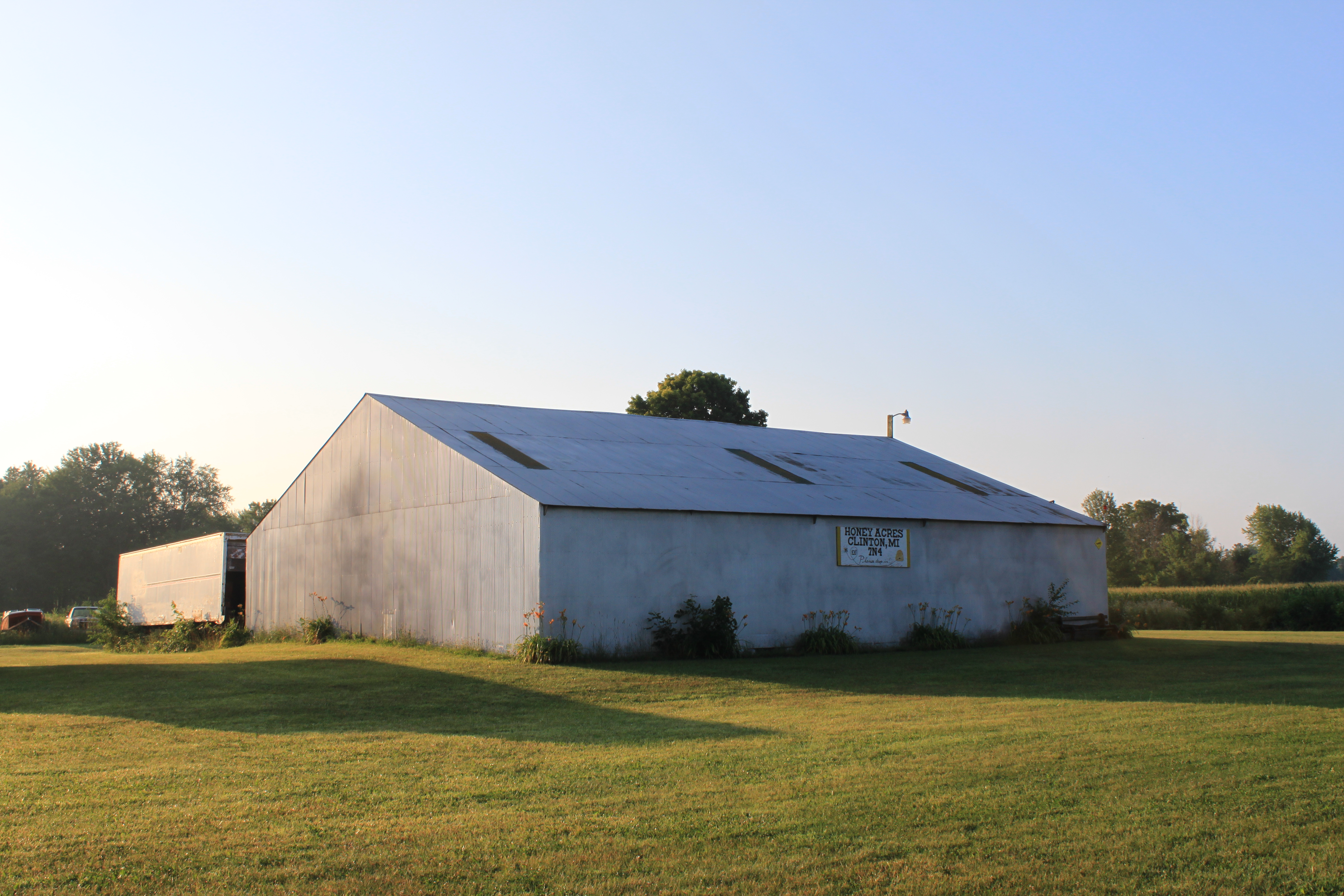
Hangar

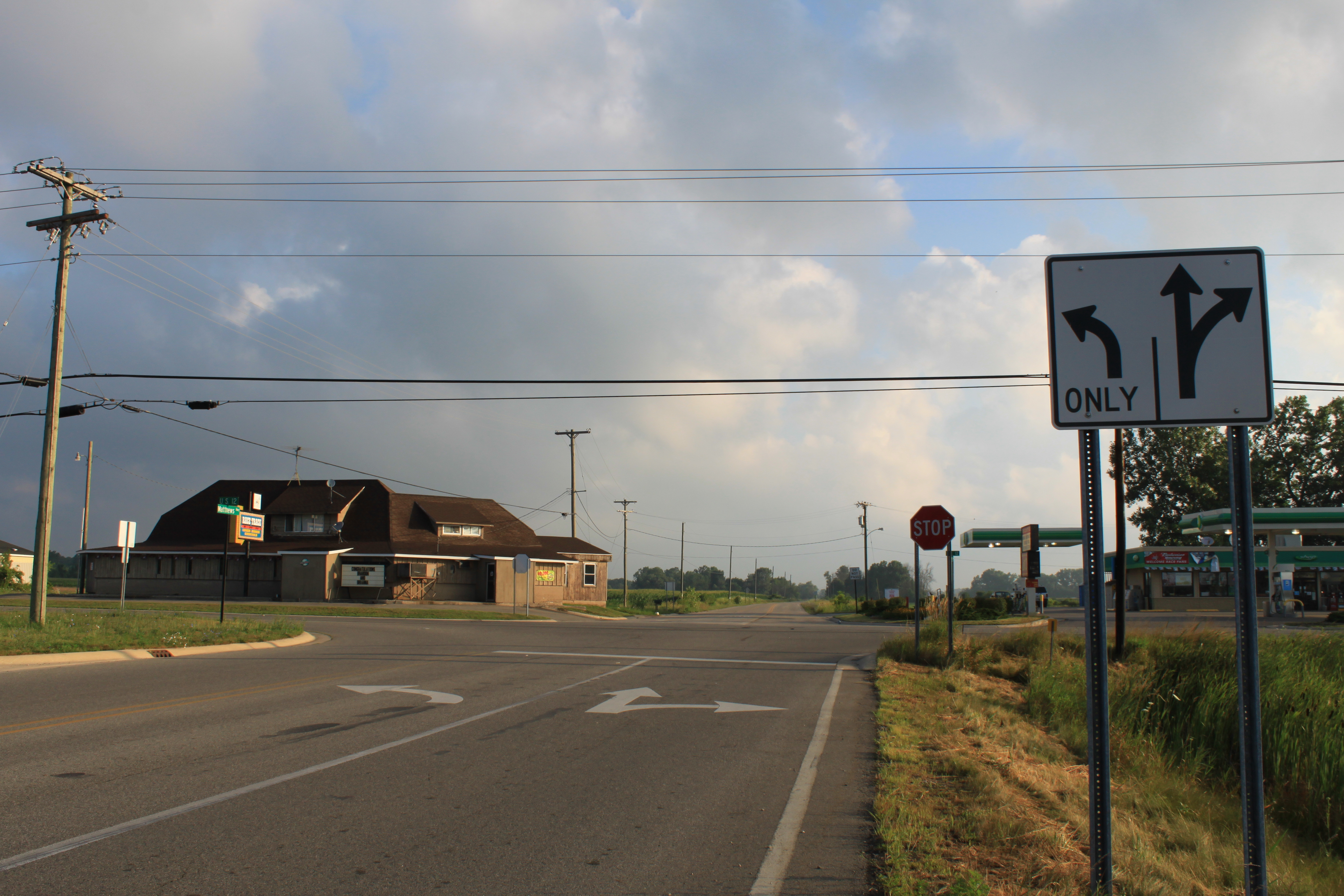
Intersection of Michigan Ave. & Bartlett Rd./Matthews Hwy at southern end of airport

Honey Acres Airport (FAA LID: 7N4) is a privately owned, public use airport located one mile (1.6 km) west of Clinton, Michigan on W. Michigan Ave. It spans the border between Lenawee and Washtenaw counties.

The airport is owned by Sharon A. Kussmaul Trust and operated by Richard R. and Jayce R. Kussmaul, who also own and operate the Kussmaul Honey Farm, hence the name of the airport. The airport is at an elevation of 820 feet (250 m).

The airport opened in July 1990. The airport encompasses an area of 60 acres (240,000 m^{2}).

== Facilities and aircraft ==
The airport has one runway, designated as runway 18/36, with a grass surface. It measures 3800 x 90 ft (1158 x 27 m).

The airport has hangars for based aircraft, but it does not have any fixed-base operators.

For the 12-month period ending December 31, 2017, the airport had 456 aircraft operations per year, an average of 38 per month. It was all general aviation. For the same time period, there are 4 aircraft based on the field, all single-engine airplanes.

== See also ==
- List of airports in Michigan
