= East Jordan City Airport =

Public use airport in East Jordan, MI

- IATA: none; ICAO: none; FAA LID: Y94

Summary
- Owner/Operator: City of East Jordan, MI
- Time zone: UTC−05:00 (-5)
  - Summer (DST): UTC−04:00 (-4)
- Elevation AMSL: 641 ft / 195.4 m
- Coordinates: 45.13166°N 85.10694°W
- Interactive map of East Jordan City Airport

Runways
Direction	Length		Surface
Direction	ft	m	Surface
9/27	3,250	991	Asphalt

Statistics (2021)
- Aircraft Movements: 1500

East Jordan City Airport (FAA LID: Y94) is a publicly owned, public use airport located 2 miles southeast of the town of East Jordan, Michigan. It is at an elevation of 641 feet (195.4 m).

== Facilities and aircraft ==
The airport has two runways. Runway 9/27 is 3250 x 50 feet (991 x 15 m) and is paved with asphalt. Runway 18/36 is 1800 x 120 ft (549 x 37 m) and is turf. Runway 18/36 is closed from November to April and when otherwise covered with snow.

For the 12-month period ending December 31, 2021, the airport had roughly 1,500 aircraft operations per year, an average of 29 per week. It was entirely general aviation. For the same time period, 3 aircraft were based on the field, all single-engine airplanes.

The airport does not have a fixed-base operator, and no fuel is available.

== Accidents and incidents ==
- On October 20, 1966, a Myers 200-B airplane crashed after taking off from East Jordan Airport.
- On March 23, 1996, a Cessna 182H Skylane impacted terrain while landing in East Jordan. Two witnesses reported hearing the aircraft engine "sputtering" and "cutting out" prior to its resuming "normal sound." Another witness reporting seeing the airplane "very low" prior to its nose dropping down" and contacting the runway. The FAA Inspectors reported the airplane contacted a 3 to 4 foot high, 6 foot wide snow pile at the approach end of runway 27. The snow pile was described as being "hard" and consisting of snow covered solid ice. The airplane contacted the east side of the snow pile, which was located mainly to the east of the runway end lights. The probable cause of the accident was found to be the pilot's failure to maintain clearance with the terrain during the landing.

== See also ==
- List of airports in Michigan
