= Napoleon Airport =

Public use airport in Napoleon, Michigan

- IATA: none; ICAO: none; FAA LID: 3NP

Summary
- Airport type: Public
- Owner: BSC REALTY, LLC
- Operator: Skydive Tecumseh
- Serves: Napoleon, Michigan
- Location: Jackson County, Michigan
- Time zone: UTC−05:00 (-5)
  - Summer (DST): UTC−04:00 (-4)
- Elevation AMSL: 963 ft / 294 m
- Coordinates: 42°10′16″N 084°15′40″W
- Interactive map of Napoleon Airport

Runways
Direction	Length		Surface
Direction	ft	m	Surface
9/27	2,740	835	Turf
15/33	2,500	762	Turf

Statistics (2021)
- Aircraft movements: 9855

Napoleon Airport (FAA LID: 3NP) is a privately owned, public use airport located 1 mile northwest of Napoleon in Jackson County, Michigan, United States. The airport sits on 95 acres at an elevation of 963 feet.

The airport is a hub for skydiving, with multiple locations at the airport. The airport is one of Michigan's original turbine drop zones. Jumping evaluators, tandem examiners, accelerated freefall instructors, and senior and master riggers are available. Skydiving is usually available from May to October, and it is open on weekends for the rest of the year, weather permitting.

The airport was bought by Skydive Tecumseh, the main skydiving operator at the airport, in 2016.

== Facilities and aircraft ==
The airport has two runways, both turf. Runway 9/27 measures 2740 x 200 ft (835 x 61 m), and runway 15/33 is 2500 x 160 ft (762 x 49 m). The runways are not plowed in winter, and they grow especially soft during springtime.

For the 12-month period ending December 31, 2021, the airport has 9,855 annual aircraft operations, an average of 27 per day. It is entirely general aviation. For the same time period, 17 aircraft were based at the airport: 13 single-engine airplanes, 3 ultralights, and 1 multi-engine airplane.

The airport does not have a fixed-base operator, and no fuel is available at the airport.

== Accidents and incidents ==
- On July 18, 2006, a Cessna 182 Skylane impacted fence posts, a fence, and a tree during an aborted landing. The pilot had already aborted a previous approach, and landed on the second attempt despite coming in too high. The pilot did not have enough runway left to stop so he added full power to go around. However, the engine did not produce the expected power, so the pilot pulled power off again and landed the airplane back on the runway. An FAA inspector later revealed that the Skylane's ground tracks began more than halfway down the 2,740 foot long runway and right of the runway center, and ground scars indicated a wing impact with the ground were also found. The aircraft impacted posts off the end of the runway. The probable cause of the accident was found to be the pilot's failure to perform a go-around, which resulted in landing long on the airstrip.
- On August 16, 2006, a Piper PA-28 Cherokee was damaged after overrunning the runway during its landing attempt. The pilot reported he was too high and fast on approach and that, after touchdown, the aircraft went off of the runway, across an adjacent road, and through a fence prior to coming to a stop near a storage barn. The probable cause of the accident was found to be the pilot's failure to maintain a proper glidepath and airspeed during the approach, causing the overrun.

== See also ==
- List of airports in Michigan
