= Baldwin Municipal Airport =

Public use airport in Baldwin, Michigan

- IATA: none; ICAO: none; FAA LID: 7D3

Summary
- Owner/Operator: Baldwin, Michigan
- Serves: Baldwin, Michigan
- Location: Lake County, Michigan
- Time zone: UTC−05:00 (-5)
  - Summer (DST): UTC−04:00 (-4)
- Elevation AMSL: 828 ft / 252 m
- Coordinates: 43°52′31″N 085°50′33″W
- Interactive map of Baldwin Municipal Airport

Runways
| Direction | Length | | Surface |
| Direction | ft | m | Surface |
|---|---|---|---|
| 9/27 | 3,800 | 1,158 | Asphalt |
| 5/23 | 2,800 | 853 | Turf |

Statistics (2019)
- Aircraft movements: 348

Baldwin Municipal Airport (FAA LID: 7D3) is a publicly owned, public use airport located two miles (3.2 km) south of Baldwin in Lake County, Michigan, United States. The airport sits on 135 acres (55 ha) at an elevation of 828 feet (252 m).

== Events ==
=== RC Expo ===
The airport hosts the annual Western Michigan Remote Control Expo. Events are held at the Baldwin RC Park, which is considered a part of the airport. This is one of at least four events that the Lake County Modelers and Flyers Association (LCMFA) hosts at Baldwin Municipal Airport every year. Pilots come to fly model RC jets in an effort to promote the hobby, and pilots often fly in with their piston aircraft as well. Simulators are available for testing, and the LCMFA offers community members free flights in regular aircraft.

=== Blessing of the Bikes ===
The airport's most popular event is the annual Blessing of the Bikes. Thousands of motorcycle riders gather at the airport to receive a blessing for a safe riding season. The event is organized by the Para-Dice Motorcycle Club of Grand Rapids along with the Lake County Chamber of Commerce. The event is held on the third Sunday of May every year, and traffic is rerouted away from the airport to make space.

The event began in 1972 with four bikes at Baldwin's St. Ann's Catholic Church when some bikers rode through Lake County, where they raised money for the community and received a blessing from a priest. It has since grown to be a weekend-long event that also includes more fundraising, music, vendors, food, and contests. The airport sees thousands of riders every year. The event is well appreciated for bringing so many tourists to Baldwin and the airport itself.

== Facilities and aircraft ==
The airport has two runways. Runway 9/27 measures 3,800 by 75 feet (1,158 m × 23 m) and is paved with asphalt. Runway 5/23 measures 2,800 by 100 feet (853 m × 30 m) and is turf.

For the 12-month period ending December 31, 2019, the airport had 348 movements, an average of 29 per month. It was entirely general aviation. For the same time period there were two aircraft based on the field, both single-engine airplanes.

== Accidents and incidents ==
- On June 24, 2022, a Van's RV-6 experienced a landing gear collapse during a hard landing at the Baldwin Municipal Airport.

== See also ==
- List of airports in Michigan
