= Prickett–Grooms Field =

Airport in Michigan, United States

- IATA: none; ICAO: none; FAA LID: 6Y9

Summary
- Airport type: Public
- Owner: Southern Houghton County Airport and Heritage Association
- Serves: Sidnaw, Michigan
- Time zone: UTC−05:00 (-5)
  - Summer (DST): UTC−04:00 (-4)
- Elevation AMSL: 1,372 ft / 418 m
- Coordinates: 46°30′31″N 088°42′21″W
- Website: sidnaw.org

Map
- Location of airport in Michigan 6Y9 (the United States)

Runways
Direction	Length		Surface
Direction	ft	m	Surface
10/28	2,600	792	Turf

Statistics
- Aircraft operations (2017): 150
- Based aircraft (2021): 0
- Source: Federal Aviation Administration

Prickett–Grooms Field, (FAA LID: 6Y9) is a privately owned, public use airport located 1 mi (1.6 km) northeast of the central business district of Sidnaw, Michigan, a community in Houghton County, Michigan, United States.

Although most airports in the United States use the same three-letter location identifier for the FAA and the International Air Transport Association (IATA), this airport is assigned 6Y9 by the FAA but has no designation from IATA.

== History ==
The Sidnaw Airport has been in existence (as a sod field) since at least 1944. The airport served commerce, airmail, and military training, but it had little traffic by the turn of the 21st century. It was closed by the state of Michigan in 2004 after a fatal crash, and was re-opened under auspices of a private group in July 2006. It was bought in 2006 by the Southern Houghton County Airport and Heritage Association (SHCAH), who currently own and operate the field, as a public-use (daytime only) general-aviation facility. It is considered "closed" during winter months as well as at other times when there is snow on the runway.

The SHCAH also operates a museum near the airport to generate knowledge about and interest in the facility. They are working to restore an old World War 2 L-4 Grasshopper training base on a portion of the airfield.

== Facilities and aircraft ==
Prickett–Grooms Field covers an area of 46 acres (19 ha) at an elevation of 1372 feet (418 m) above mean sea level. It has one runway, oriented nearly east-west: runway 10/28 is 2,600 (2200 feet usable for landing) by 100 feet (792 x 30 m) with a turf surface.

For the 12-month period ending December 31, 2017, the airport had 150 aircraft operations, all general aviation. In November 2021, no aircraft were based at this airport (due to its "closed" status during winter).

== Accidents and incidents ==
- On June 6, 2003, a Cessna 172S was destroyed on impact with trees and terrain during initial climb from runway 28 at Pricket-Grooms Field Airport. The passenger onboard, who survived the crash, reported that, on its first landing attempt, the aircraft touched down halfway down the runway, bounced, and touched down again. The pilot attempted a go-around and pulled back on the controls before attempting a lefthand bank. The passenger said the plane felt like it dipped, and something hit the aircraft. The aircraft then suddenly banked and dove nose-first into the ground. The probable cause of the accident was found to be an improper short/soft field landing procedure by the pilot and his lack of recent experience in type of operation.

== See also ==
- List of airports in Michigan
- List of airports in Michigan's Upper Peninsula
