= Hillman Airport =

Public use airport in Hillman, Michigan

- IATA: none; ICAO: none; FAA LID: Y95

Summary
- Owner/Operator: City of Hillman, MI
- Time zone: UTC−05:00 (-5)
  - Summer (DST): UTC−04:00 (-4)
- Elevation AMSL: 850 ft / 259 m
- Coordinates: 45°04′59″N 83°56′12″W
- Interactive map of Hillman Airport

Runways
Direction	Length		Surface
Direction	ft	m	Surface
4/22	3,400	1,036	Asphalt

Statistics (2018)
- Aircraft movements: 1400

The Hillman Airport (FAA LID: Y95) is a publicly owned, public use airport located 2 miles northwest of the city of Hillman, Michigan.

The airport plays host to non-profit fundraisers, most notably 5K runs to benefit the Wings of Mercy. The airport has also played home to training exercises for the Michigan Air National Guard.

== Facilities and aircraft ==
The airport has two runways. Runway 4/22 measures 3400 x 60 ft (1036 x 18 m) and is paved with asphalt. Runway 18/36 is 2900 x 100 ft (884 x 30 m) and is turf.

The aircraft does not have a fixed-base operator, and no fuel is available. However, hangars are available for rental from the city for locally based aircraft.

Based on the 12-month period ending December 31, 2018, the airport has roughly 1400 aircraft operations per year, an average of 27 per week. It is all general aviation. For that same period, there were 4 aircraft based at the airport, all single-engine airplanes.

== See also ==
- List of airports in Michigan
