= Campbell-Pratt Airport =

Public use airport in Michigan, US

- IATA: none; ICAO: none; FAA LID: Y65

Summary
- Time zone: UTC−05:00 (-5)
  - Summer (DST): UTC−04:00 (-4)
- Elevation AMSL: 614 ft / 187 m
- Coordinates: 45.40634°N 84.60048°W
- Interactive map of Campbell-Pratt Airport

Runways
Direction	Length		Surface
Direction	ft	m	Surface
10/28	3,005	916

Statistics (2021)
- Aircraft movements: 3588

The Campbell-Pratt Airport (FAA LID: Y65) is a publicly owned, public use airport located 1 mile east of Indian River, in Tuscarora Township, Michigan.

The airport hosts a chapter of the Experimental Aircraft Association, which hosts events such as fly-ins and pancake breakfasts.

== History ==
A state representative donated land to the township in 1936 for use as an airport. The land was cleared after World War II for a runway. The runway was paved in 1988.

== Facilities and aircraft ==
The airport has one runway, designated as runway 10/28. It measures 3005 x 50 ft (916 x 15 m) and is paved with asphalt.

The airport has a fixed-base operator that offers avgas.

Based on the 12-month period ending December 31, 2021, the airport has 3,588 airport operations, an average of 69 per week. It is entirely general aviation. For the same time period, 14 aircraft are based on the airport: 11 single-engine airplanes, 2 ultralights, and 1 jet.

== Accidents and incidents ==
- On October 21, 2004, a Stinson 108-2 was substantially damaged during a forced landing following a loss of engine power after takeoff at the Calvin Campbell Municipal Airport. The pilot reported he had reached an altitude of 800 feet, when the engine completely lost power. In order to avoid an urban area and interstate highway ahead, he elected to make a 180-degree turn and return to the airport. The pilot reported that after the turn the aircraft was not in a position to land on the runway. The reason for the engine failure could not ultimately be determined.

== See also ==
- List of airports in Michigan
