= Merillat Airport =

Public use airport in Tecumseh, Michigan

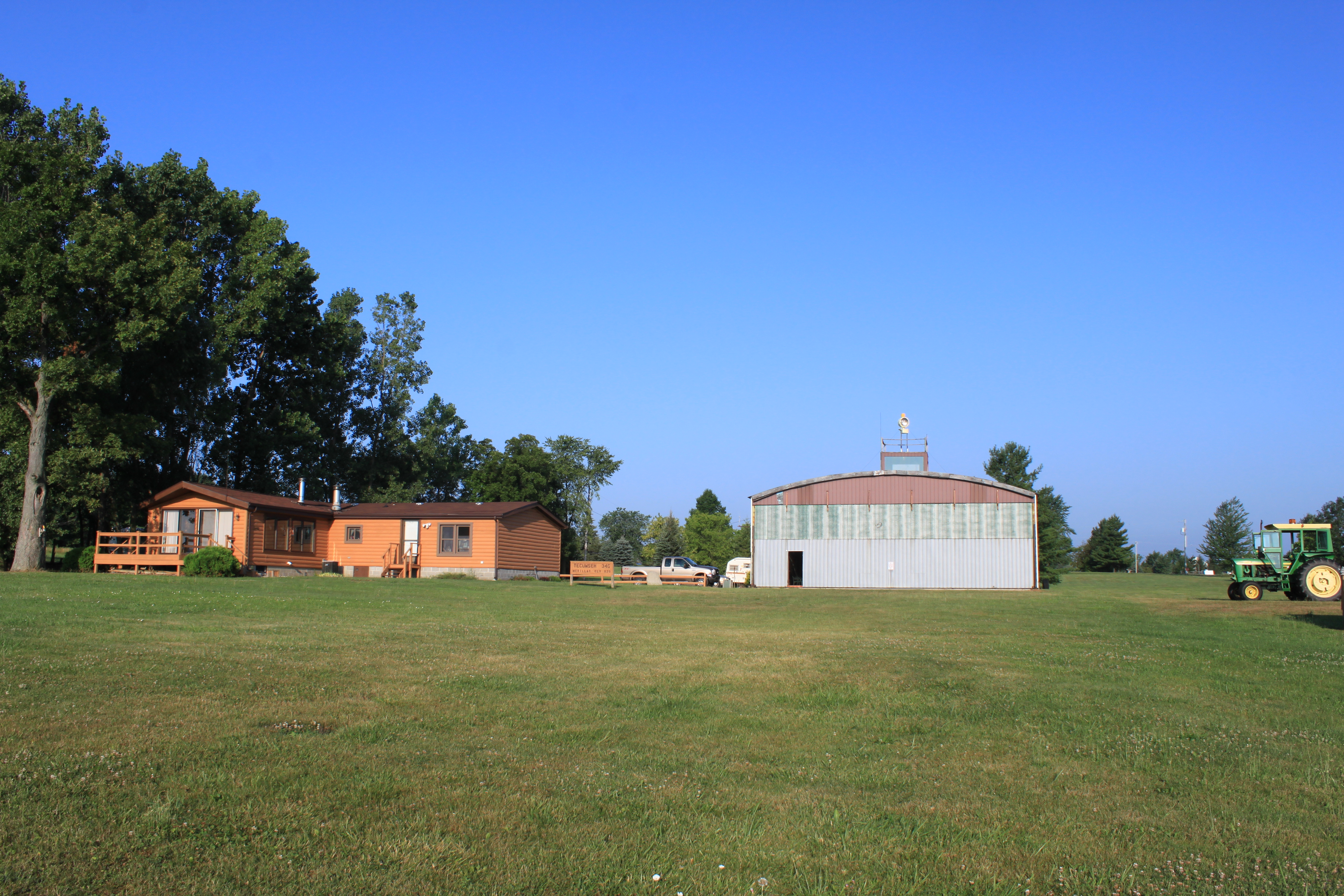
- Airport office, hangar & control tower
- IATA: none; ICAO: none; FAA LID: 34G

Summary
- Airport type: Public
- Owner: James N. Merillat
- Operator: Jeff Wright
- Serves: Tecumseh, Michigan
- Time zone: UTC−05:00 (-5)
  - Summer (DST): UTC−04:00 (-4)
- Elevation AMSL: 820 ft / 250 m
- Coordinates: 41°58′09″N 083°55′25″W
- Interactive map of Merillat Airport

Runways
Direction	Length		Surface
Direction	ft	m	Surface
18/36	3,608	1,100	Turf

Statistics (2019)
- Aircraft operations: 984
- Based aircraft: 21
- Source: Federal Aviation Administration

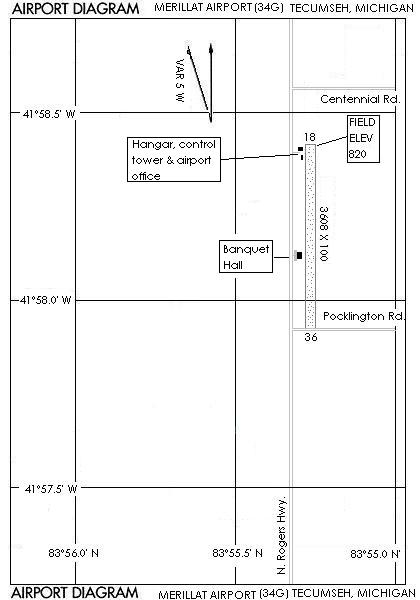
Airport diagram (click to enlarge)

Merillat Airport (FAA LID: 34G) is a public use airport located three nautical miles (6 km) southeast of the central business district of Tecumseh, in Lenawee County, Michigan, United States. It is owned by James N. Merillatt and managed by Jeff Wright. The airport opened in February 1976. "The Landing" banquet hall is adjacent to the airport on N. Rogers Rd.

== Facilities and aircraft ==
Merillat Airport covers an area of 28 acres (11 ha) at an elevation of 820 feet (250 m) above mean sea level. It has one runway designated 18/36 with a turf surface measuring 3,608 by 100 feet (1,100 x 30 m).

For the 12-month period ending December 31, 2021, the airport had 984 general aviation aircraft operations, an average of 82 per month. This is down from 2,280 annual operations in 2005. At that time there were 21 aircraft based at this airport: 20 single-engine airplanes and 1 ultralight.

Fuel is available at the airport.

== Accidents and incidents ==
- On December 5, 2001, a Miller Lancair 235 sustained substantial damage when it departed controlled flight and impacted terrain on takeoff from runway 18 at the Tecumseh Merillat Airport. The pilot said that the aircraft was pushed right of runway heading by winds during takeoff, and airspeed began to bleed off. The pilot lowered the nose to increase airspeed and brought the plane back over runway heading. The aircraft was subsequently hit with a gust of wind, and its wing impacted the runway, causing the pilot to lose control of the aircraft. The probable cause of the accident was found to be the pilot's failure to maintain aircraft control during the takeoff. Factors relating to the accident were the crosswind and the wind gusts.

== Gallery ==
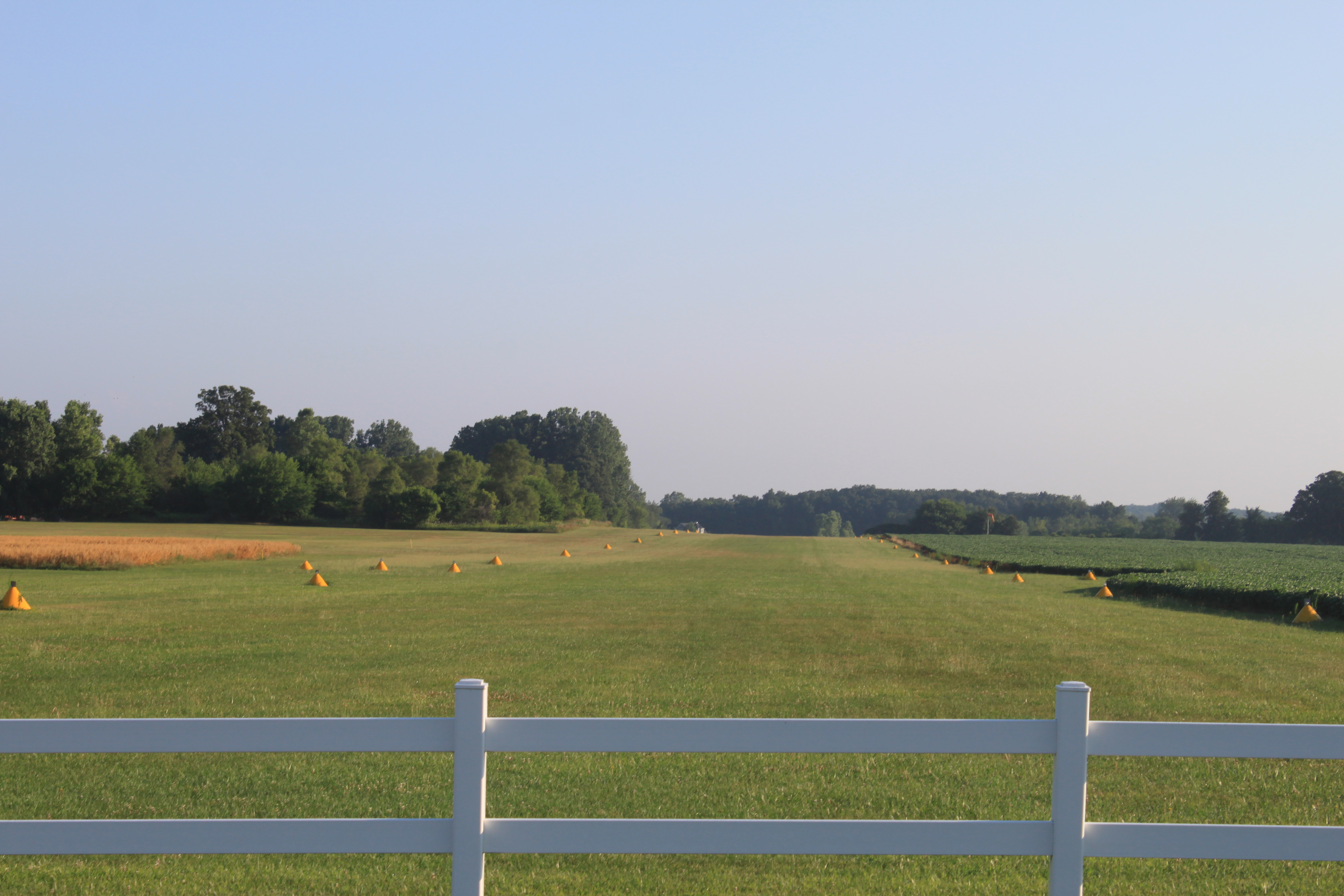
Runway facing north from Pocklington Rd.

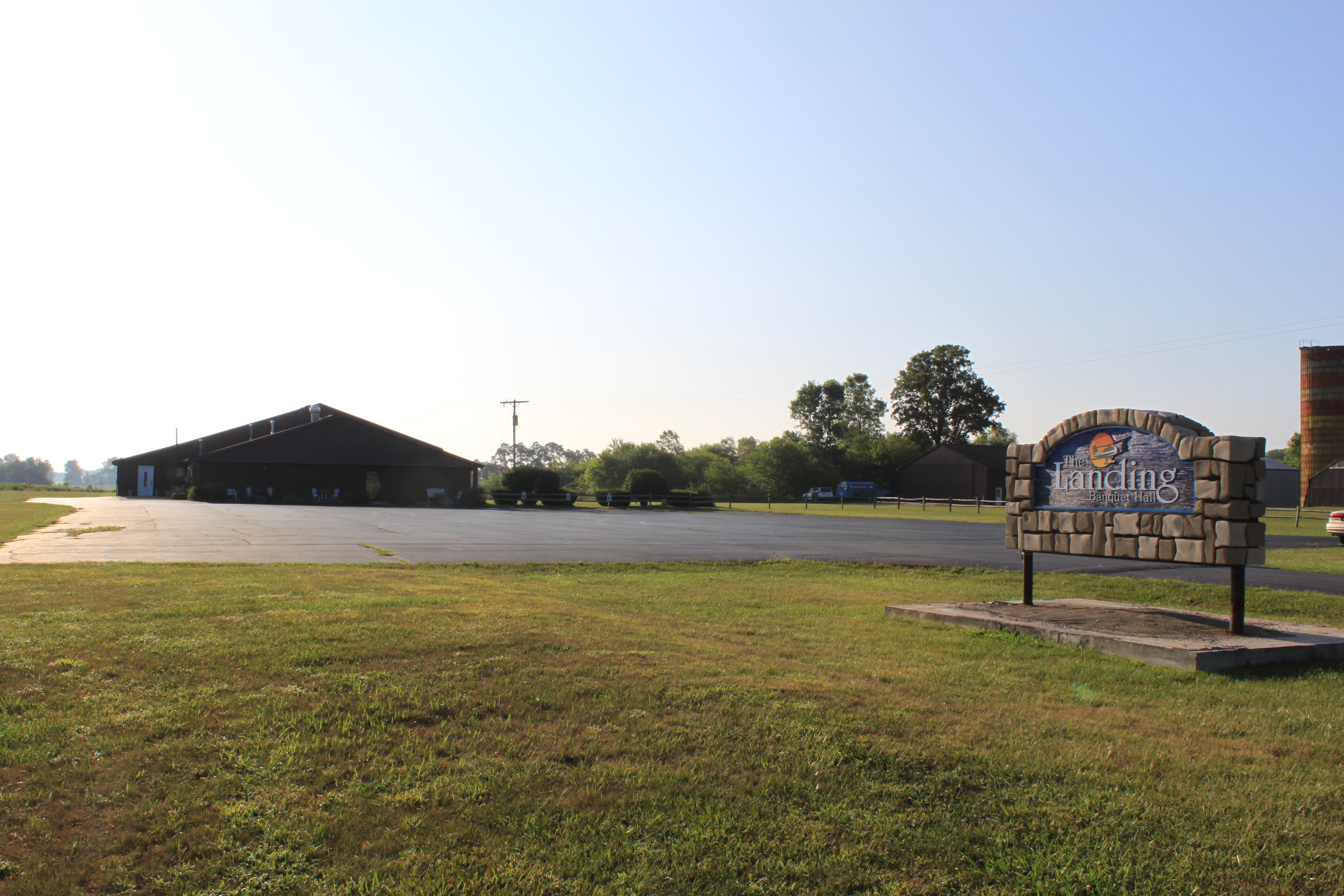
"The Landing" banquet hall

== See also ==
- List of airports in Michigan
