= Ojibwa Airpark =

Public use airport in Weidman, Michigan

- IATA: none; ICAO: none; FAA LID: D11

Summary
- Owner/Operator: Ojibwa Property Owners Association
- Serves: Weidman, Michigan
- Time zone: UTC−05:00 (-5)
  - Summer (DST): UTC−04:00 (-4)
- Elevation AMSL: 959 ft / 292 m
- Coordinates: 43°43′14″N 085°00′09″W
- Interactive map of Ojibwa Airpark

Runways
Direction	Length		Surface
Direction	ft	m	Surface
5/23	3,600	1,097	Turf

Statistics (2019)
- Aircraft movements: 504

The Ojibwa Airpark (FAA LID: D11) is a privately owned, public use airport located 3 miles northwest of Weidman, Michigan, United States. The airpark sits on 25 acres at an elevation of 959 feet.

Though it does not have a chapter, the airport regularly plays host to events sponsored by the Experimental Aircraft Association (EAA). The airport hosts events such as annual fly-ins and pancake breakfasts.

== Facilities and aircraft ==
The airpark has one runway, designated as runway 5/23. It measures 3600 x 125 ft (1097 x 38 ft) and is made of turf. For the 12-month period ending December 31, 2019, the airport had 504 aircraft operations, an average of 42 per month. It was all general aviation. For the same time period, 5 aircraft were based at the airpark, all single-engine airplanes.

The airport does not have a fixed-base operator, and no fuel is publicly available.

== Accidents and incidents ==
- On February 3, 2021, a Piper J3 Cub crashed while operating at the Ojibwa Airpark. The pilot flew a low-altitude approach over the runway, which was covered in snow at the time. During the approach, the aircraft's landing gear hit the snow, and the airplane subsequently nosed over. The probable cause was found to be the pilot's failure to maintain clearance from terrain during a low approach over a snow-covered runway.

== See also ==
- List of airports in Michigan
