= Hiram Cure Airfield =

Public use airport in Sunfield, Michigan

- IATA: none; ICAO: none; FAA LID: C43

Summary
- Airport type: Public
- Owner: Kerry Haynor
- Serves: Sunfield, Michigan
- Time zone: UTC−05:00 (-5)
  - Summer (DST): UTC−04:00 (-4)
- Elevation AMSL: 853 ft (260 m)
- Coordinates: 42°46′12″N 084°57′54″W

Map
- Location within Michigan

Runways
Direction	Length		Surface
Direction	ft	m	Surface
9/27	2,314	705	Turf

Statistics (2019)
- Aircraft operations: 312
- Sources: FAA and Michigan DOT

Hiram Cure Airport or Hiram Cure Airfield (FAA LID: C43) is a public-use airport located two nautical miles (3.7 km) northeast of the central business district of Sunfield, in Eaton County, Michigan, United States. The airport is accessible by road from Eaton Hwy, and is located approximately 1 mile north of M-43.

== Facilities ==
The airport covers an area of 10 acres (4.0 ha) at an elevation of 853 feet (260 m) above mean sea level. It has one runway designated 9/27 with a turf surface measuring 2,314 by 100 feet (705 x 30 m). For the 12-month period ending December 31, 2019, the airport had 312 general aviation aircraft operations, an average of 26 per month. For the same time period, there are 3 aircraft based at the airport, all single-engine airplanes.

The airport does not have a fixed-base operator. No fuel is available at the airport.

The airport is closed from December through May, and also when snow-covered. It is attended intermittently.

== Accidents and incidents ==
- On January 31, 2001, a Cessna 172RG was substantially damaged during takeoff when the left main gear encountered slush on the runway and the airplane hit a snowbank on the left side of the runway, causing the aircraft to tip over on its right wing. The pilot reported, "...the left main gear encountered slushy snow, pulling the plane to the left into a snowbank along left side of runway, pulling the plane into the deeper snow, tipping the plane down and to the right damaging the prop and right wing tip." The probable cause was found to be the pilot's inadequate preflight preparation and the unsuitable terrain for takeoff encountered.

== See also ==
- List of airports in Michigan
