= Archer Memorial Field =

Airport in Michigan, United States

- IATA: none; ICAO: none; FAA LID: MI28

Summary
- Airport type: Public
- Owner: Beverly Archer
- Serves: St. Johns, Michigan
- Elevation AMSL: 794 ft (242 m)
- Coordinates: 42°54′25″N 084°28′20″W
- Interactive map of Archer Memorial Field

Runways
Direction	Length		Surface
Direction	ft	m	Surface
17/35	2,496	761	Turf

Statistics (2011)
- Aircraft operations: 150
- Based aircraft: 3
- Source: Federal Aviation Administration

Archer Memorial Field (FAA LID: MI28) is a privately owned public-use airport located seven nautical miles (8 mi, 13 km) southeast of the central business district of St. Johns, in Clinton County, Michigan, United States.

== Facilities and aircraft ==
Archer Memorial Field covers an area of 12 acres (5 ha) at an elevation of 794 feet (242 m) above mean sea level. It has one runway, designated 17/35, which has a turf surface. The runway measures 2,496 x 110 ft (761 x 34 m).

For the 12-month period ending December 31, 2011, the airport had 150 general aviation aircraft operations, an average of 12 per month. For the same time period, there were three aircraft based on the field, all single-engine airplanes.

== See also ==
- List of airports in Michigan
