= Lake Isabella – Cal Brewer Memorial Airport =

Lake Isabella - Cal Brewer Memorial Airport
- IATA: none; ICAO: none; FAA LID: D15

Summary
- Airport type: Public
- Owner: Village of Lake Isabella
- Serves: Lake Isabella, Michigan
- Time zone: UTC−05:00 (-5)
  - Summer (DST): UTC−04:00 (-4)
- Elevation AMSL: 886 ft / 270 m
- Coordinates: 43°38′40″N 084°58′55″W
- Interactive map of Lake Isabella - Cal Brewer Memorial Airport

Runways
Direction	Length		Surface
Direction	ft	m	Surface
11/29	2,582	787	Asphalt

Statistics (2015)
- Aircraft operations: 1,264
- Based aircraft: 9
- Source: FAA, Michigan Airport Directory

Lake Isabella – Cal Brewer Memorial Airport (FAA LID: D15) is a public use airport located one nautical mile (2 km) east of the central business district of Lake Isabella, in Isabella County, Michigan, United States. The airport is owned by the Village of Lake Isabella. It was formerly known as Lake Isabella Airpark.

== Facilities and aircraft ==
The airport covers an area of 18 acres (7 ha) at an elevation of 886 feet (270 m) above mean sea level. It has one runway,designated 11/29 with an asphalt surface measuring 2,582 by 50 feet (787 x 15 m).

For the 12-month period ending December 31, 2015, the airport had 1,264 aircraft operations, an average of 24 per week. It was all general aviation. For the same time period, there were 6 aircraft based at the airport, all single-engine airplanes.

The airport does not have a fixed-base operator, and no fuel is available.

== See also ==
- List of airports in Michigan
