= Calkins Field =

Public use airport in Wayland, Michigan

Calkins Airport
- IATA: none; ICAO: none; FAA LID: 41C

Summary
- Owner: Wayland Area Pilots Association
- Operator: Calkins Family
- Serves: Wayland, Michigan
- Time zone: UTC−05:00 (-5)
  - Summer (DST): UTC−04:00 (-4)
- Elevation AMSL: 740 ft / 226 m
- Coordinates: 42°41′30″N 085°38′53″W
- Interactive map of Calkins Airport

Runways
Direction	Length		Surface
Direction	ft	m	Surface
1/19	2,200	671	Turf
9/27	1,800	549	Turf

Statistics (2015)
- Aircraft Movements: 1508

Calkins Field (FAA LID: 41C) is a privately owned, public use airport located 1 mile north of Wayland, Michigan. The airport sits on 105 acres at an elevation of 740 feet.

The airport is named for the Calkins Family, which has lived in the Wayland area for generations. The airport is located on their property.

== Facilities and aircraft ==
The airport has two runways, both made of turf. Runway 1/19 measures 2200 x 75 ft (671 x 23 m), and runway 9/27 measures 1800 x 100 ft (549 x 30 m). For the 12-month period ending December 31, 2015, the airport had 1508 aircraft operations, an average of 29 per week. It was all general aviation. For the same time period, 10 aircraft are based at the airport: 9 single-engine airplanes and 1 ultralight.

The airport does not have a fixed-base operator. No fuel is available at the airport.

== Wayland Balloon Fest ==
The airport holds an annual hot air balloon show called the Wayland Ballon Fest. The event features hot air balloon flights, food, live music, and meet-and-greets with the balloon pilots. The event also features a 5K run. The first event was held in 2021, and it continued for a second year in 2022.

The event raises money for suicide prevention efforts. Organizers say they lost family members to suicide in the past and hope to help others receive assistance.

== See also ==
- List of airports in Michigan
