= Oceana County Airport =

Public airport in Michigan, United States

Coordinates: 43°38′30″N 086°19′44″W

Oceana County Airport is a public use airport located between the cities of Hart and Shelby, Michigan. It is publicly owned by the Oceana County Court House.

== Facilities ==
The airport has two runways. Runway 9/27 is 3500 ft × 75 ft (1067 × 23 m) and made of asphalt. Runway 15/33 is 2251 × 100 ft (686 × 30 m) and is turf.

The airport manages its own fixed-base operator on the airport. Fuel is available.

== Aircraft ==
For the 12-month period ending December 31, 2021, the airport has 57 aircraft operations per week, or about 3000 per year. It is all general aviation. For the same time period, there are 21 aircraft based on the field, all airplanes: 20 single-engine and 1 multi-engine.

== Accidents and incidents ==
- On July 15, 2022, a Cessna 210C crashed a mile and half after taking off from Oceana County Airport. Two people on board were killed. It was found that the pilot flying the aircraft was not instrument rated and therefore was not qualified to fly in the deteriorating weather conditions at the time. The crash is under investigation.

== See also ==
- List of airports in Michigan
