= Aeronut Park Balloonport =

Balloonport in Howell, Michigan

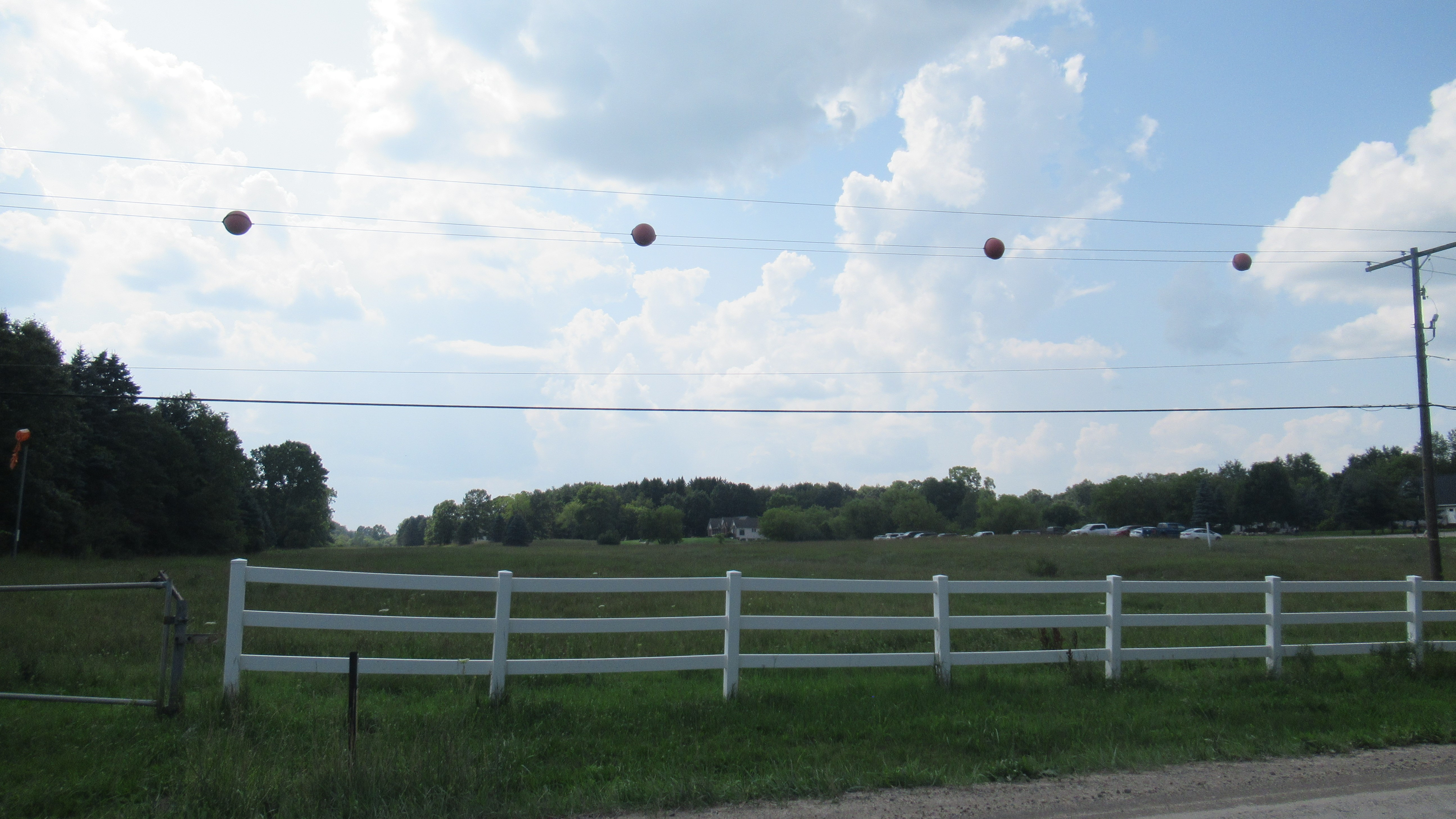
- View from North Hughes Road
- IATA: none; ICAO: none; FAA LID: 13M

Summary
- Airport type: Public
- Serves: Howell, Michigan
- Closed: August 2020
- Time zone: UTC−05:00 (-5)
  - Summer (DST): UTC−04:00 (-4)
- Elevation AMSL: 980 ft (300 m)
- Coordinates: 42°36′15″N 083°51′31″W

Map
- Location of airport in Michigan 13M (the United States)

Helipads
Number	Length		Surface
Number	ft	m	Surface
1	900	274	Turf

Statistics (2015)
- Aircraft Operations: 10
- Source: Federal Aviation Administration

Aeronut Park Balloonport (FAA LID: 13M) is a public-use balloon airport located four nautical miles (7 km) east of the central business district of Howell, a city in Livingston County, Michigan, United States.

== Facilities and aircraft ==
Aeronut Park Balloonport has one runway, designated B1 with a 900 x 250 ft (274 x 76 m) turf surface.

For the 12-month period ending December 31, 2015, the aircraft has 10 operations per year, all general aviation. For the same time period, 1 aircraft is based on the field, a single-engine airplane.

== See also ==
- List of airports in Michigan
