= Belleville Airport =

Airport in Michigan, United States

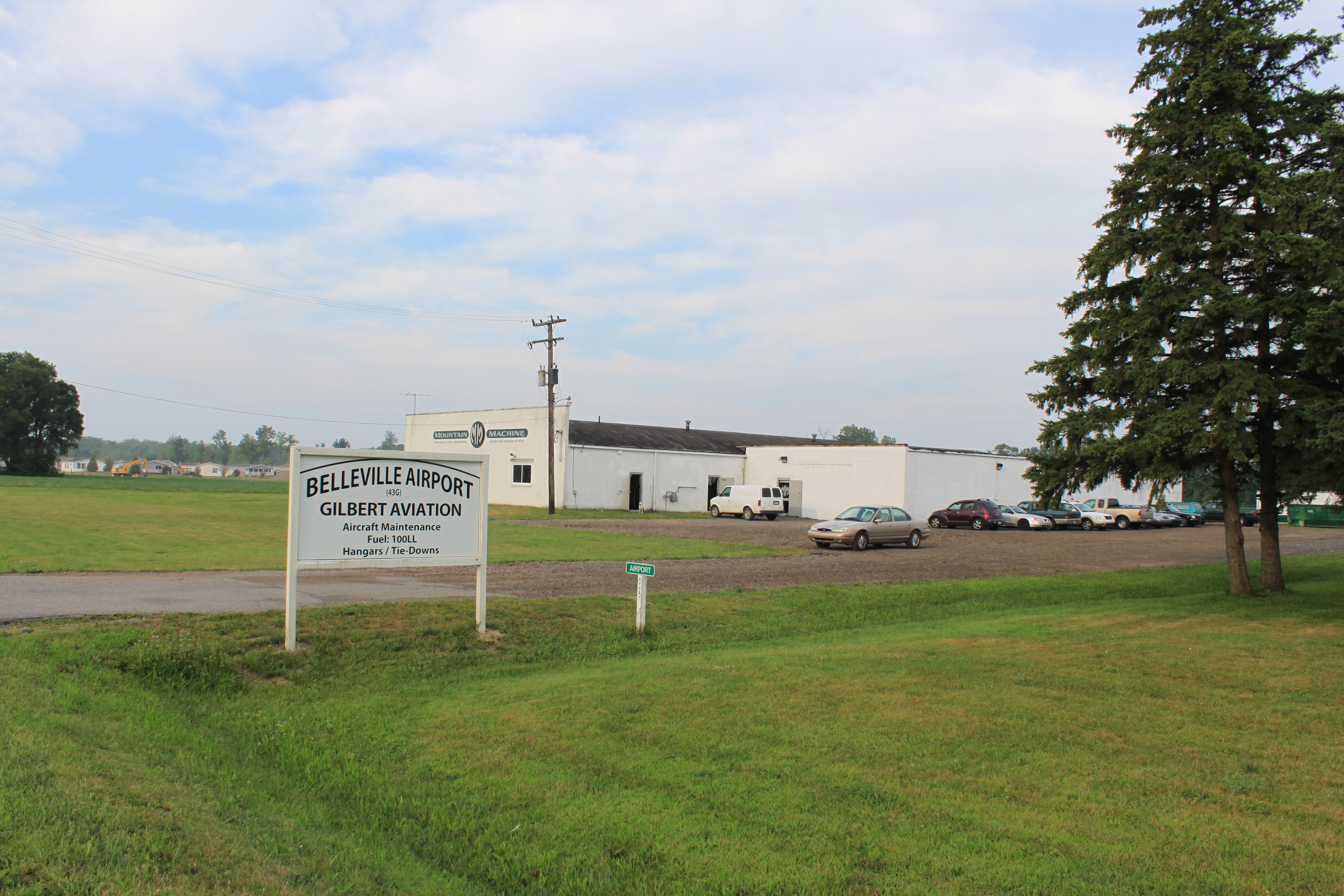
- Airport entrance
- IATA: none; ICAO: none; FAA LID: 43G

Summary
- Airport type: Public
- Owner: Kenney Farmer
- Operator: Kenney Farmer
- Serves: Belleville, Michigan
- Elevation AMSL: 696 ft / 212 m
- Coordinates: 42°10′36.15″N 83°32′44.77″W
- Interactive map of Belleville Airport

Runways
Direction	Length		Surface
Direction	ft	m	Surface
15/33	2,253	687	Turf
18/36	2,157	657	Turf

Belleville Airport (FAA LID: 43G) is a privately owned, public-use airport located three miles southwest of Belleville, Michigan, in Washtenaw County. It is owned and operated by Kenney Farmer. It is at an elevation of 696 feet. The airport was formerly named the Larsen Airpark.

The airport has two runways. Runway 15/33 is 2,253 x 80 ft (687 x 24 m) and has a turf surface. Runway 18/36 is 2,157 x 160 ft (657 x 49 m) long and also has a turf surface.

For the 12-month period ending December 31, 2019, the airport has 504 aircraft operations per year, or 42 per month. It was composed entirely of general aviation. For the same time period, there are 9 aircraft based at the field: 7 single-engine airplanes and 2 ultralights.

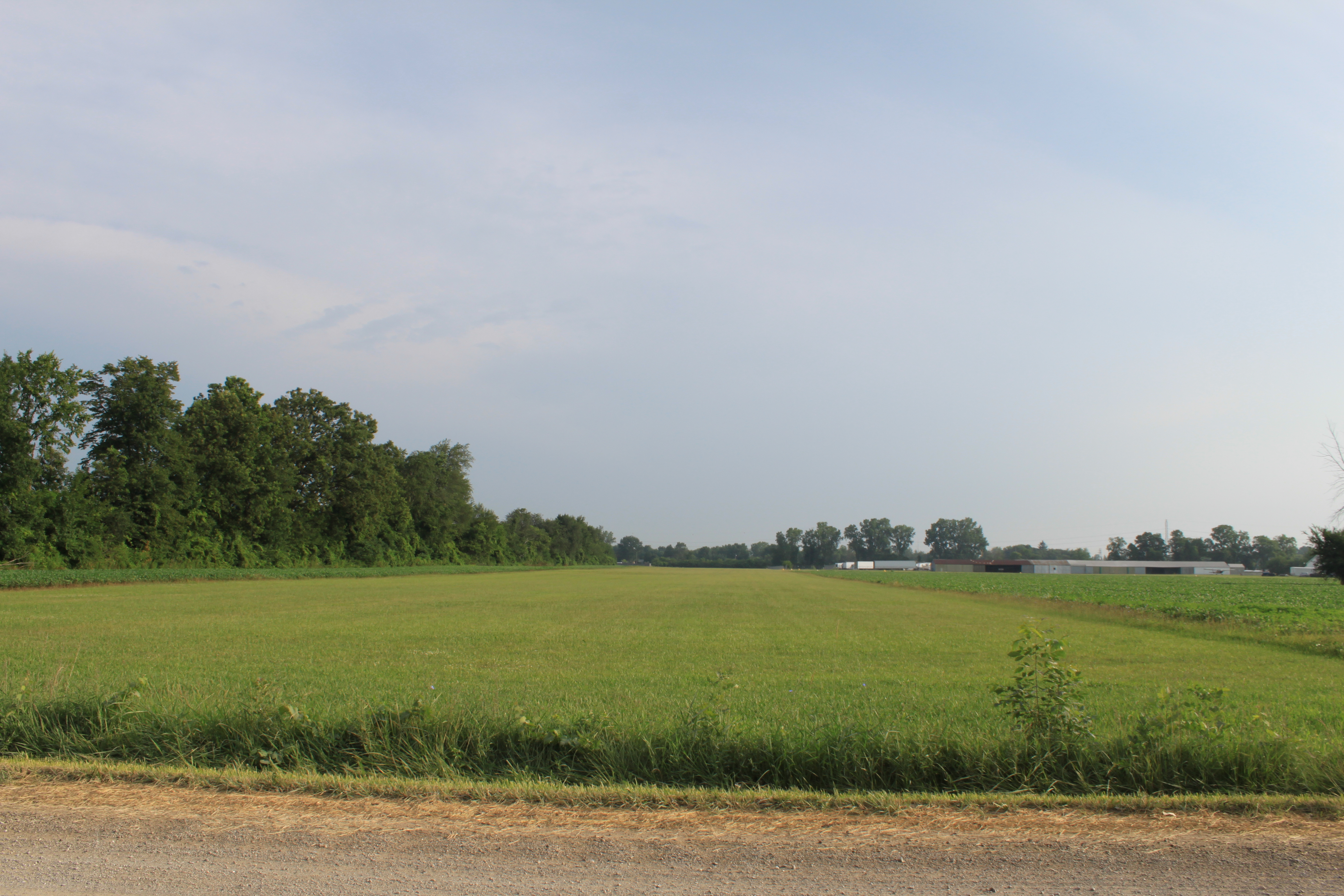
18/36 runway from Bemis Rd.

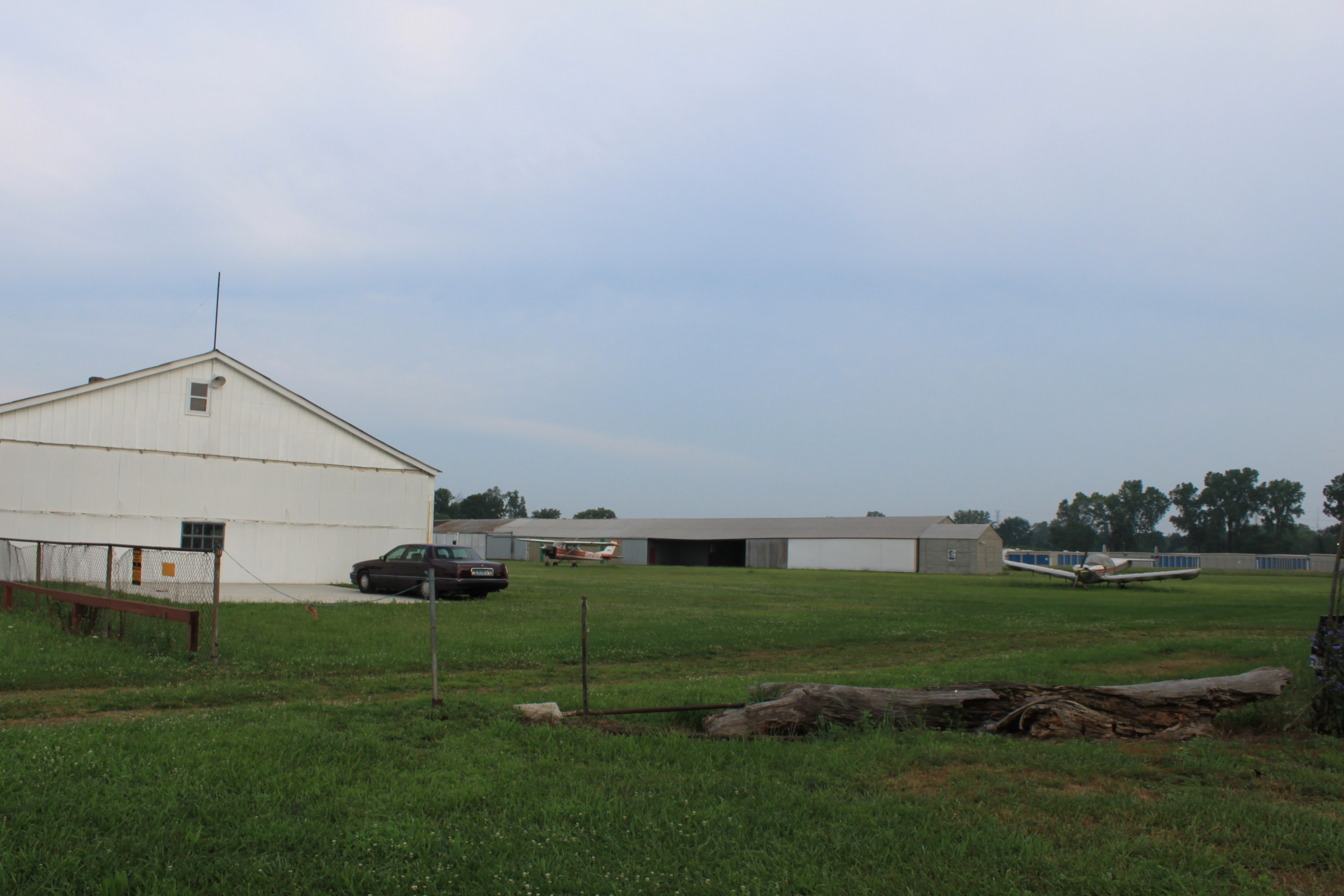
Hangar area

There is also an airport located near Belleville, Illinois, the MidAmerica St. Louis Airport.

== See also ==
- List of airports in Michigan
