= Randolph's Landing Area =

Airport in Michigan, United States

Randolph's Landing Area Randolph's Airport
- IATA: none; ICAO: none; FAA LID: 61G

Summary
- Airport type: Public use
- Owner: Larry Randolph
- Serves: St. Johns, Michigan
- Elevation AMSL: 700 ft / 213 m
- Coordinates: 43°06′45″N 084°31′15″W
- Interactive map of Randolph's Landing Area

Runways
Direction	Length		Surface
Direction	ft	m	Surface
5/23	2,175	663	Turf

Statistics (2005)
- Aircraft operations: 230
- Sources: FAA, Michigan Airport Directory

Randolph's Landing Area (FAA LID: 61G), also known as Randolph's Airport, is a privately owned, public use airport located seven nautical miles (13 km) northeast of the central business district of St. Johns, a city in Clinton County, Michigan, United States.

== Facilities and aircraft ==
The airport covers an area of 6 acres (2 ha) at an elevation of 700 feet (213 m) above mean sea level. It has one runway, which is designated as 5/23 and has a turf surface. The runway measures 2,175 x 100 ft (663 x 30 m). For the 12-month period ending December 31, 2005, the airport had 230 general aviation aircraft operations, an average of 19 per month.

== See also ==
- List of airports in Michigan
