= Oscoda County Dennis Kauffman Memorial Airport =

- IATA: none; ICAO: none; FAA LID: 51M

Summary
- Airport type: Public
- Owner: Oscoda County
- Serves: Mio, Michigan
- Elevation AMSL: 1,050 ft / 320 m
- Coordinates: 44°40′29″N 084°07′19″W

Map
- Location of airport in Michigan 51M (the United States)

Runways
Direction	Length		Surface
Direction	ft	m	Surface
10/28	3,000	914	Asphalt

Statistics (2021)
- Aircraft operations: 1196
- Based aircraft: 9
- Source: Federal Aviation Administration

Oscoda County Dennis Kauffman Memorial Airport (FAA LID: 51M) is a county-owned, public-use airport in Oscoda County, Michigan, United States. It is located two nautical miles (4 km) north of the central business district of Mio, Michigan. Formerly known as Oscoda County Airport, it was renamed in 2011 to honor Dennis Kauffman, who served on the Oscoda County Board of Commissioners for more than 20 years.

It is included in the Federal Aviation Administration (FAA) National Plan of Integrated Airport Systems for 2017–2021, in which it is categorized as a basic general aviation facility.

== Facilities and aircraft ==
The airport covers an area of 80 acres (32 ha) at an elevation of 1,050 feet (320 m) above mean sea level. It has one runway designated 10/28 with an asphalt surface measuring 3,000 by 75 feet (914 x 23 m).

For the 12-month period ending December 31, 2021, the airport had 1196 aircraft operations, an average of 23 per week. All were general aviation. At that time there were nine aircraft based at this airport, including 8 single-engine airplanes and 1 helicopter.

== Accidents and incidents ==
- On June 28, 2021, a Lake LA-4-200 Buccaneer crashed after takeoff from Dennis Kauffman Memorial Airport. The pilot reported its engine was producing 200 RPM less on the takeoff roll. He decided to continue the takeoff and began to fly back towards the airport but crashed into trees before he could land normally.

== See also ==
- List of airports in Michigan
