= Milwrick Flying "M" Airport =

Public use airport in Lincoln, Michigan

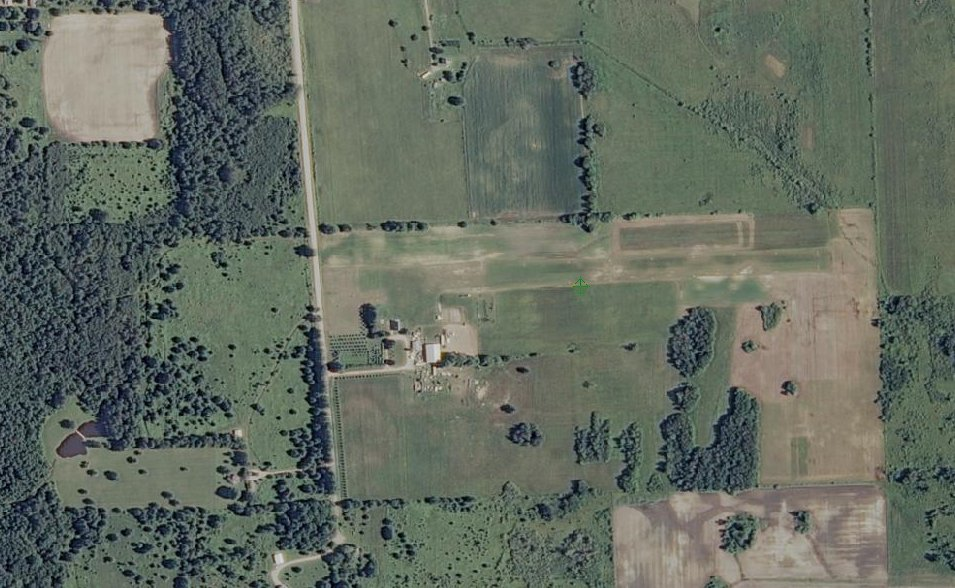
- IATA: none; ICAO: none; FAA LID: 3L7

Summary
- Airport type: Public
- Owner: Nancy Milwrick
- Serves: Lincoln, Michigan
- Time zone: UTC−05:00 (-5)
  - Summer (DST): UTC−04:00 (-4)
- Elevation AMSL: 830 ft / 253 m
- Coordinates: 44°44′18″N 083°22′47″W
- Interactive map of Milwrick Flying "M" Airport

Runways
Direction	Length		Surface
Direction	ft	m	Surface
9/27	2,200	671	Turf

Statistics (2010)
- Aircraft operations: 100
- Sources: FAA, Michigan Airport Directory

Milwrick Flying "M" Airport (FAA LID: 3L7) is a privately owned, public use airport located three nautical miles (6 km) northeast of the central business district of Lincoln, a village in Alcona County, Michigan, United States. It was formerly known as Flying "M" Ranch Airport.

== Facilities and aircraft ==
The airport covers an area of 10 acres (4 ha) at an elevation of 830 feet (253 m) above mean sea level. It has one runway, designated 9/27, with a turf surface that measures 2,200 by 90 feet (671 x 27 m).

There is no fixed-base operator at the airport.

For the 12-month period ending December 31, 2020, the airport had 100 general aviation aircraft operations, an average of 8 per month. For the same time period, 3 aircraft were based at the airport, all single-engine airplanes.

== See also ==
- List of airports in Michigan
