= Lakes of the North Airport =

Airport in Michigan

- IATA: none; ICAO: none; FAA LID: 4Y4

Summary
- Owner/Operator: LAKES OF THE NORTH ASSN
- Time zone: UTC−05:00 (-5)
  - Summer (DST): UTC−04:00 (-4)
- Elevation AMSL: 1,287 ft / 392 m
- Website: https://lakesofthenorth.com/Airport
- Interactive map of Lakes of the North Airport

Runways
Direction	Length		Surface
Direction	ft	m	Surface
6/24	4,121	1,284	Asphalt

Statistics (2021)
- Aircraft Operations: 1976

Lakes of the North Airport (FAA LID: 4Y4) is a privately owned, public use airport located 11 miles southwest of Gaylord, Michigan. The airport covers 40 acres at an elevation of 1287 feet.

The airport operates as a residential airpark, where locals own homes adjacent to the airport and flying their planes in and out. It is operated by the Lakes of the North Association, which maintains other facilities such as a golf course, clubhouse, and campervan village. The airport hosts regular events for residents and other locals, including poker nights, golfing, car shows, bicycle rides, and more.

== Facilities and aircraft ==
The airport has one runway, designated as runway 6/24. It measures 4212 x 40 ft (1284 x 12 m) and is paved with asphalt. It is all general aviation. For the 12-month period ending December 31, 2021, the airport has 1,976 aircraft operations per week, an average of 38 per week. For the same time period, there are 9 aircraft based at the airport, all airplanes: 8 single-engine and 1 multi-engine.

The airport does not have a fixed-base operator, and there is no fuel available.

== Accidents and incidents ==
- On November 21, 2012, a Cessna 310B impacted terrain after departing Lakes of the North Airport. The cause of the accident was found to be the pilot's failure to maintain control of the airplane after a loss of right engine power. The cause of that failure could not be determined because postaccident examination revealed no preimpact malfunction or anomaly that would have precluded normal operation.

== See also ==
- List of airports in Michigan
