= Watervliet Municipal Airport =

Public use airport in Watervliet, Michigan

- IATA: none; ICAO: none; FAA LID: 40C

Summary
- Owner/Operator: Watervliet Township
- Serves: Watervliet, Michigan
- Time zone: UTC−05:00 (-5)
  - Summer (DST): UTC−04:00 (-4)
- Elevation AMSL: 656 ft (200 m)
- Coordinates: 42°12′02″N 086°14′57″W
- Interactive map of Watervliet Municipal Airport

Runways
Direction	Length		Surface
Direction	ft	m	Surface
2/20	2,600	792	Turf
7/25	1,540	469	Turf

Statistics (2019)
- Aircraft Movements: 1612

Watervliet Municipal Airport (FAA LID: 40C) is a publicly owned, public use airport located 1 mile northeast of Watervliet, Michigan, United States. The airport sits on 77 acres at an elevation of 656 feet.

The airport is home to a chapter of the Experimental Aircraft Association (EAA). The chapter hosts a variety of events at the airport, especially for Young Eagles interested in getting into aviation. There are pancake breakfasts, airplane rides, and more.

== Facilities and aircraft ==
The airport has two runways, both made of turf. Runway 2/20 measures 2600 × 200 ft (792 × 61 m), and runway 7/25 is 1540 × 200 ft (469 × 61 m). For the 12-month period ending December 31, 2019, the airport had 1612 aircraft operations, an average of 31 per week. It was entirely general aviation. For the same time period, there were 20 aircraft based at the airport: 19 single-engine airplanes and 1 ultralight.

== Accidents and incidents ==
- On July 6, 2006, an Aviat A-1 nosed over when landing at Watervliet Municipal Airport. While landing, the pilot said a deer neared the runway, and he hit the brakes harder, at which point the aircraft nosed over. The probable cause of the accident was found to be the presence of the deer on the runway which resulted in the pilot taking evasive action leading to the nose-over.
- On June 16, 2017, an Aeronca 11AC Chief crashed just after takeoff from Watervliet Municipal Airport. The flight instructor onboard reported that, during the takeoff climb from a grass runway with the student pilot flying, about 25 ft above ground the "climb rate became stagnant." He added that he instructed the student to "lower the nose slightly," but after "several seconds the airplane did not resume a normal climb rate." The flight instructor took the flight controls and noticed that they were "sluggish" and it felt as if the airplane was caught in "wind swirls" and downdrafts. Subsequently, the flight instructor made a "small left turn" toward a small gap in the tree line ahead and the airplane impacted a heavily wooded/treed area. The instructor reported that the airplane was loaded at max gross weight at the time of the crash. The probable cause of the accident was found to be the flight instructor's inadequate preflight planning, which resulted in a takeoff over maximum gross weight from a turf runway in high-density altitude conditions and the airplane's inability to attain a climb rate and subsequent collision with trees.

== See also ==
- List of airports in Michigan
