= Riverview Airport =

Public use airport in Jenison, Michigan

- IATA: none; ICAO: none; FAA LID: 08C

Summary
- Owner: RIVERTOWN AIRPORT LLC
- Serves: Grand Rapids, Michigan
- Location: Jenison, Michigan
- Time zone: UTC−05:00 (-5)
  - Summer (DST): UTC−04:00 (-4)
- Elevation AMSL: 603 ft / 184 m
- Coordinates: 42°56′12″N 085°48′20″W
- Interactive map of Riverview Airport

Runways
Direction	Length		Surface
Direction	ft	m	Surface
14/32	3,920	1,195	Asphalt

Statistics (2021)
- Aircraft Movements: 4,992

Riverview Airport (FAA LID: 08C) is a privately owned, public use airport located three miles (4.8 km) northwest of Jenison, Michigan. The airport sits on 60 acres (24 ha) of land at an elevation of 603 feet (184 m).

The airport is home to the Grand Rapids chapter of the Experimental Aircraft Association. The chapter hosts regular meetings and events each month.

== Facilities and aircraft ==
The airport has one runway, designated as runway 14/32. It measures 3,920 by 49 feet (1,195 m × 15 m) and is paved with asphalt. For the 12-month period ending December 31, 2021, the airport averaged 4,992 aircraft operations per year, an average of 96 per week. It was entirely general aviation. For the same time period, 35 aircraft were based at the airport, all airplanes: 34 single-engine and 1 multi-engine.

The airport has a fixed-base operator that sells fuel to pilots. It offers limited amenities and a pilot lounge as well.

== Accidents and incidents ==
- On June 1, 2003, a Stinson 108-1 sustained substantial damage when the right main landing gear collapsed during landing rollout at the Riverview Airport. The pilot stated that, upon touchdown, the airplane instantly veered to the left. The pilot reported that he applied full right rudder and the brakes, but could not regain control of the airplane. The pilot stated that the right wing came in contact with the ground, and the right landing gear collapsed. The airplane then "slid" off the left side of the runway, and the propeller struck the ground twice before the airplane came to a full stop. The probable cause of the accident was found to be the pilot's failure to maintain directional control of the airplane during landing. A factor to the accident was the overload of the right main landing gear.
- On August 26, 2009, a Vans RV-7A sustained substantial damage during an approach to the airport with a simulated engine failure. The established a 500-foot per minute descent on the base leg to final. He angled the airplane toward the touchdown zone with the left wing slightly low. He reported that when the airplane was at 30 feet above ground level, he applied power and the nose pitched up 20 – 30 degrees. The left wing scraped the pavement, the airplane veered off the runway, and the airplane nosed over. The probable cause of the accident was found to be the pilot's failure to maintain aircraft control during the landing.
- On February 12, 2013, a Cessna 172M sustained substantial damage after touchdown at Riverview Airport. After touchdown on the ice and snow-covered runway, the airplane began drifting to the right. The pilot attempted to correct with left rudder input; however, the airplane continued to the right, and the right main landing gear wheel entered the snow off the runway surface. The airplane impacted a snowbank, nosed over, and came to rest inverted. The probable cause of the accident was found to be the pilot's failure to maintain directional control while landing on an ice- and snow-covered runway in crosswind conditions.

== See also ==
- List of airports in Michigan
