= Buzzwick Airport =

Public use airport in Michigan

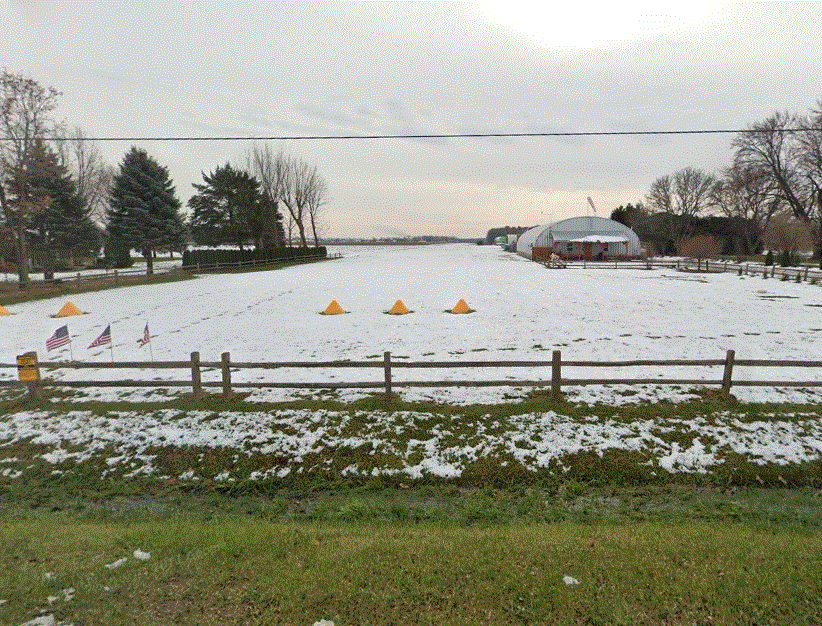
- Airport entrance from E Labo RD
- IATA: none; ICAO: none; FAA LID: W87

Summary
- Airport type: Public use
- Owner: Buzzwick Airport LLC
- Operator: Mitchell Noble
- Serves: Carleton, Michigan
- Time zone: UTC−05:00 (-5)
  - Summer (DST): UTC−04:00 (-4)
- Elevation AMSL: 610 ft (190 m)
- Coordinates: 42°01′16.0″N 83°22′21.5″W
- Interactive map of Buzzwick Airport

Runways
Direction	Length		Surface
Direction	ft	m	Surface
18/36	2,575	785	Turf

Statistics (2020)
- Aircraft operations: 732
- Sources: FAA, Michigan Airport Directory

Buzzwick Airport (FAA LID: W87) is a privately owned, public use airport located three nautical miles (6 km) south of the central business district of Carleton, a village in Monroe County, Michigan, United States. It is owned and operated by Buzzwick Airport LLC.

The airport's current Airport manager is Mitchell Noble. The airport was formerly known as Wickenheiser Airport when it was owned and managed by Cletus Wickenheiser.

== Facilities and aircraft ==
The airport covers an area of 17 acres at an elevation of 610 feet (186 m) above mean sea level. It has one runway with turf surfaces: 18/36 is 2,575 by 60 feet (785 x 18 m).

No fuel is available at the airport.

For the 12-month period ending December 31, 2020, the airport had 732 general aviation aircraft operations, an average of 31 per month. At that time there were six aircraft based at this airport, all single-engine airplanes.

== See also ==
- List of airports in Michigan

)
