= Avoca Airport =

Airport in Michigan, United States

- IATA: none; ICAO: none; FAA LID: 39G

Summary
- Airport type: Public
- Owner: Leland Engel
- Serves: Avoca, Michigan
- Elevation AMSL: 726 ft (221 m)
- Coordinates: 43°01′48″N 082°40′10″W
- Interactive map of Avoca Airport

Runways
Direction	Length		Surface
Direction	ft	m	Surface
9/27	2,105	642	Turf

Statistics (2020)
- Aircraft operations: 150
- Sources: FAA, Michigan Airport Directory

Avoca Airport (FAA LID: 39G) is privately owned, public use airport located two nautical miles (4 km) southeast of the central business district of Avoca, in St. Clair County, Michigan, United States. It is owned by the people whose land it encompasses. Until 2008 it was known as Rasor Airport, owned and managed by William Rasor.

== Facilities and aircraft ==
The airport covers an area of 40 acres (16 ha) at an elevation of 726 feet (221 m) above mean sea level. It has one runway designated 9/27 with a turf surface measuring 2,105 by 100 feet (642 x 30 m).

No fuel is available at the airport.

For the 12-month period ending December 31, 2021, the airport had 150 aircraft operations, all general aviation, an average of 12 per month. For the same time period, there are 7 aircraft based on the field, all single-engine airplanes.

== See also ==
- List of airports in Michigan
