= Bois Blanc Island Airport =

Public-use airport in Michigan, United States

Coordinates: 45°45′59″N 084°30′17″W

Bois Blanc Island Airport is a public-use airport three miles (4.8 km) northwest of the community of Bois Blanc Island, Michigan, United States. The airport is publicly owned by Bois Blanc Township.

The airport has one runway designated as 10/28. It is 3,498 by 75 feet (1,066 m × 23 m) and is paved with asphalt. There is no fixed-base operator or fuel located at the airport.

The airport's runway was unpaved until 2005, at which time it was also extended.

For the 12-month period ending December 31, 2021, the airport had 67 operations per week, or about 3,500 per year. This was made up of 86% general aviation and 14% air taxi. For the same time period, there were two aircraft based at the airport, both single-engine airplanes.

== See also ==
- List of airports in Michigan
