= Dupont-Lapeer Airport =

Public airport in Lapeer, Michigan, United States

Coordinates: 43°04′00″N 083°16′20″W

Dupont-Lapeer Airport is a public use airport located two miles (3.2 km) northeast of Lapeer in Mayfield Township, Lapeer County, Michigan. The airport is publicly owned by the township.

The Civil Air Patrol operates a cadet program at the airport that teaches students to fly using gliders. The chapter participates in a variety of events besides flight training to keep cadets engaged with the program.

== History ==
DuPont-Lapeer Airport was built soon after World War II ended. It was purchased by the G. B. DuPont Company in 1956, who subsequently sold it to Mayfield Township in 1996.

The airport was initially funded through grants from the Federal Aviation Administration (FAA) and local funds, many of which were provided by the DuPont Company. It is currently self-sustaining using fees from hangar rentals, fuel sales, and renting land to farmers for crop growth.

== Facilities and aircraft ==
The airport has two runways. Runway 18/36 is 3,800 by 75 feet (1,158 m × 23 m) and paved with asphalt. Runway 9/27 is 1,879 by 150 feet (573 m × 46 m) and is made of turf.

A fixed-base operator (FBO) is based on the field to provide fuel for local and transient aircraft. Restrooms, conference rooms, a lounge, and a weather briefing station are also available. The FBO is an FAA-certified repair station and offers aircraft rental.

The airport has hangar space for up to 60 based aircraft.

For the 12-month period ending December 31, 2021, the airport averaged 43 aircraft operations per day, or about 15,500 per year. It is all general aviation. For the same time period, there were 51 aircraft based on the field, all single-engine airplanes.

== See also ==
- List of airports in Michigan
