= Edward F Johnson Airport =

Public use airport in Ishpeming, Michigan

- IATA: none; ICAO: none; FAA LID: M61

Summary
- Airport type: Public
- Owner: Marilee Koval
- Serves: Ishpeming, Michigan
- Time zone: UTC−05:00 (-5)
  - Summer (DST): UTC−04:00 (-4)
- Elevation AMSL: 1,446 ft (441 m)
- Coordinates: 46°20′42.79″N 087°47′18.49″W

Map
- Location of airport in Michigan M61 (the United States)

Runways
Direction	Length		Surface
Direction	ft	m	Surface
18/36	2,200	671	Turf

Statistics
- Aircraft operations (2017): 825
- Based aircraft (2021): 4
- Source: Federal Aviation Administration

Edward F Johnson Airport (FAA LID: M61) is a privately owned, public use airport ten miles (16 km) south of the central business district of Ishpeming, a city in Marquette County, Michigan, United States.

== Facilities and aircraft ==
Edward F Johnson Airport covers an area of 75 acres (0.30 km^{2}) and contains one runway designated 18/36 with a 2,200 x 100 ft (671 x 30 m) turf surface. For the 12-month period ending December 31, 2017, the airport had 825 aircraft operations, an average of 69 per month: 100% general aviation. In November 2021, there were 4 aircraft based at this airport, all single-engine airplanes.

The airport does not have a fixed-base operator, and no fuel is available.

== See also ==
- List of airports in Michigan
