= Duford Field =

Public use airport in Genesee, Michigan

- IATA: none; ICAO: none; FAA LID: 68G

Summary
- Airport type: Public use
- Owner: Norman Duford
- Serves: Genesee, Michigan
- Time zone: UTC−06:00 (-6)
  - Summer (DST): UTC−05:00 (-5)
- Elevation AMSL: 773 ft (236 m)
- Coordinates: 43°07′30″N 083°37′35″W
- Interactive map of Duford Field

Runways
Direction	Length		Surface
Direction	ft	m	Surface
18/36	3,068	935	Turf

Statistics (2009)
- Aircraft operations: 100
- Source: FAA, Michigan DOT

Duford Field (FAA LID: 68G) is a privately owned, public use airport located one nautical mile (2 km) northwest of the central business district of Genesee, in Genesee County, Michigan, United States.

== Facilities and aircraft ==
Duford Field covers an area of 30 acres (12 ha) at an elevation of 773 feet (236 m) above mean sea level. It has one runway, designated 18/36. It has a turf surface and measures 3,068 by 100 feet (935 x 30 m).

For the 12-month period ending December 31, 2009, the airport had 100 general aviation aircraft operations.

== See also ==
- List of airports in Michigan
