= Lowell City Airport =

Public use airport in Lowell, Michigan

- IATA: none; ICAO: none; FAA LID: 24C

Summary
- Airport type: Public
- Owner: City of Lowell
- Operator: Lowell Airport Board
- Serves: Lowell, Michigan
- Location: Lowell, Michigan
- Time zone: UTC−05:00 (-5)
  - Summer (DST): UTC−04:00 (-4)
- Elevation AMSL: 681 ft / 208 m
- Interactive map of Lowell City Airport

Runways
Direction	Length		Surface
Direction	ft	m	Surface
12/30	2,394	730	Asphalt
6/24	2,700	823	Turf
15/33	1,940	591	Turf

Statistics (2020)
- Aircraft operations: 2500
- Based aircraft: 31
- Source: Federal Aviation Administration

Lowell City Airport (FAA LID: 24C) is a city-owned public-use airport located one mile (2 km) north of the central business district of Lowell, a city in Kent County, Michigan, United States.

== Facilities and aircraft ==
Lowell City Airport covers an area of 72 acres (29 ha). It has three runways: one asphalt paved runway, designated as runway 12/30 and measuring 2,394 x 48 ft (730 x 15 m), as well as two turf runways, 6/24 measuring 2,700 x 100 ft (823 x 30 m) and 15/33 measuring 1,940 x 100 ft (591 x 30 m).

For the 12-month period ending December 31, 2020, the airport had 2500 operations, an average of 48 operations per week. At that time there were 31 aircraft based at this airport: 29 single-engine airplanes and 2 ultralights.

Fixed-base operations are provided by Midwest Aviation Services. Fuel is available, as is maintenance.

== Incidents and accidents ==
- On August 24, 2014, at about 11:30 AM, a man trying out a newly bought experimental plane was spotted erratically taxiing down runway 6. After taking off, the pilot flew around the airport for about five minutes before going in to land. The approach was noted to be too steep and too fast. The plane eventually reached a "good speed" 1,000 feet down the runway and leveled off before descending further at a high angle. The plane bounced and then exited the runway, stopping in some shrubbery. The pilot, despite being told not to, got the airplane back on the runway and did a 180 to align with the runway. The pilot applied full throttle and the plane abruptly turned right, veering off the runway. The airplane continued going perpendicular to the runway. It was angled at a very high attack rate and rolled to the right. The plane crashed into trees 100 yards South of the departure runway. The cause was determined to be pilot error. The pilot was killed in the crash.
- On January 19, 2015, a student pilot attempting a solo landing in a Cessna 172 Skyhawk clipped pine trees short of the runway. The aircraft crashed on the driveway of a private residence, coming extremely close to the house. The pilot was able to get out of the plane and go to the house for help, where he was sent to the hospital. The student pilot made a full recovery.

== See also ==
- List of airports in Michigan
