= Van Wagnen Airport =

Public use airport in Napoleon, Michigan

- IATA: none; ICAO: none; FAA LID: 6H4

Summary
- Airport type: Public use
- Owner: Brian Van Wagnen
- Serves: Napoleon, Michigan
- Time zone: UTC−05:00 (-5)
  - Summer (DST): UTC−04:00 (-4)
- Elevation AMSL: 980 ft / 299 m
- Coordinates: 42°09′23″N 084°20′04″W
- Interactive map of Van Wagnen Airport

Runways
Direction	Length		Surface
Direction	ft	m	Surface
9/27	2,105	642	Turf

Statistics (2021)
- Aircraft operations: 1196
- Sources: FAA, Michigan Airport Directory

Van Wagnen Airport (FAA LID: 6H4) is a privately owned, public use airport located five nautical miles (6 mi, 9 km) west of the central business district of Napoleon, a community in Napoleon Township, Jackson County, Michigan, United States. It was formerly known as Day Field, owned by Janet Day.

== Facilities and aircraft ==
The airport covers an area of 10 acres (4 ha) at an elevation of 980 feet (299 m) above mean sea level. It has one runway designated 9/27 with a turf surface measuring 2,105 by 55 feet (642 x 17 m).

There is no fixed-base operator at the airport.

For the 12-month period ending December 31, 2021, the airport had 1196 aircraft operations, an average of 23 per week. All were general aviation. For the same period, 5 aircraft were based at the airport, all airplanes: 4 single-engine and 1 multi-engine.

== Accidents and incidents ==
- On July 18, 2006, a Cessna 182 Skylane contacted fence posts, a fence, and a tree during an aborted landing. The pilot reported he made a go around on his first landing approach because he was coming in high and long. He stated the second approach was high, but he landed on the runway. He stated he felt he did not have enough runway left to stop so he added full power. The pilot reported he did not receive the expected response from the airplane, so he pulled the power off and landed the airplane back on the runway. The probable cause of the accident was found to be the pilot's failure to perform a go-around which resulted in landing long on the airstrip.
- On August 16, 2006, a Piper PA-28 Cherokee was substantially damaged during an overrun while landing. The pilot reported that, during the landing approach, he was too high and too fast. He stated that the airplane went off of the runway, across an adjacent road, and through a fence prior to coming to a stop near a storage barn. The probable cause of the accident was found to be the pilot's failure to maintain a proper glidepath during the landing approach, and his excessive airspeed during the landing which resulted in the overrun.

== See also ==
- List of airports in Michigan
