= Cackleberry Airport =

Airport in Michigan, United States

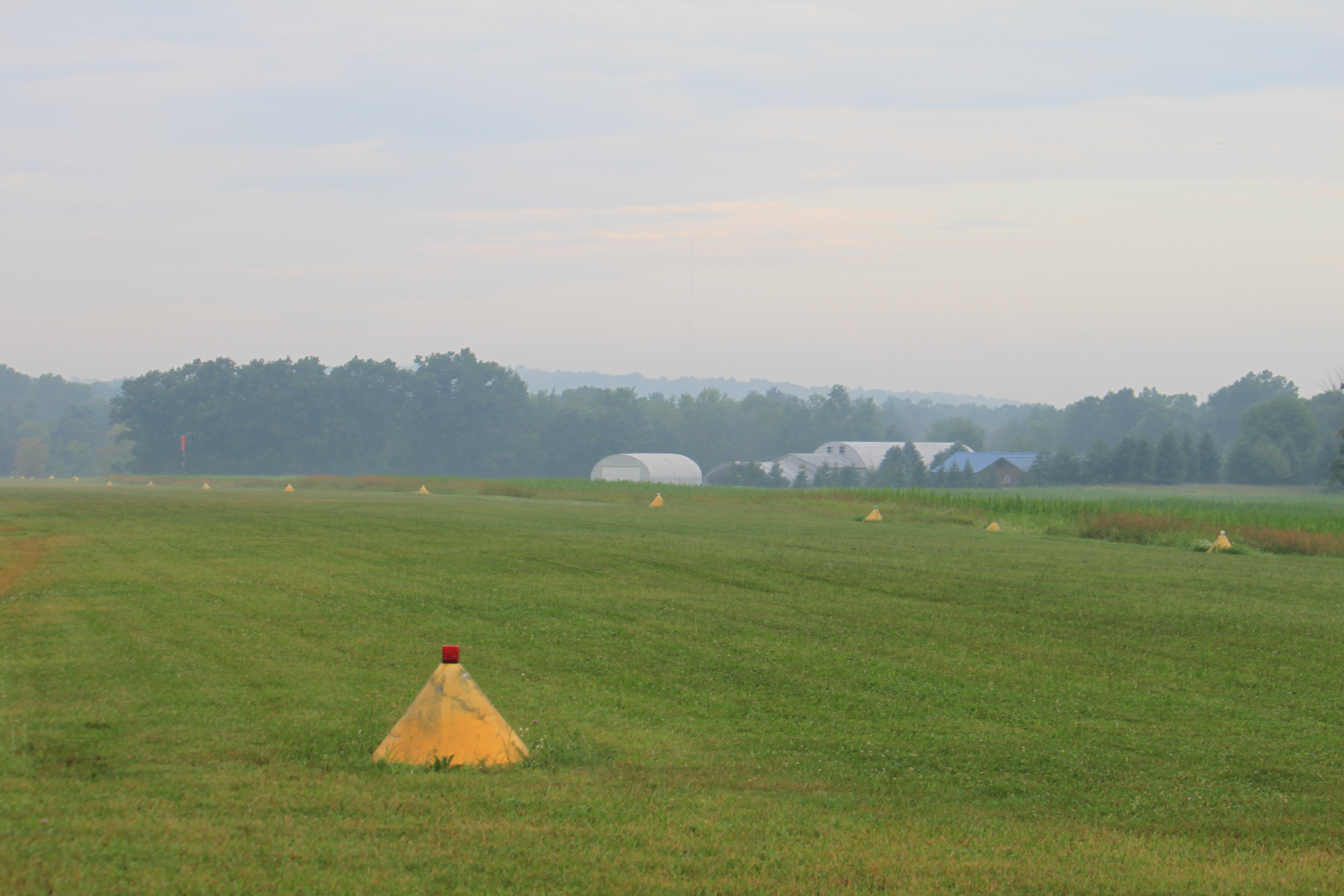
- View from Hermitage Way
- IATA: none; ICAO: none; FAA LID: 2E8

Summary
- Serves: Dexter, MI
- Time zone: UTC−05:00 (-5)
  - Summer (DST): -4 (UTC−04:00)
- Elevation AMSL: 898 ft (274 m)
- Coordinates: 42.4242413°N 83.8702754°W
- Interactive map of Cackleberry Airport

Runways
Direction	Length		Surface
Direction	ft	m	Surface
6/24	2,113	644	Turf

Statistics (2021)
- Aircraft movements: 100

Cackleberry Airport (FAA LID: 2E8) is a privately owned, public use airport located five nautical miles (6 mi, 9 km) north of the central business district of Dexter, a village in Washtenaw County, Michigan, United States.

== Facilities and aircraft ==
Cackleberry Airport covers an area of 40 acres (16 ha) at an elevation of 890 feet (271 m) above mean sea level.

It has one runway, which is designated 6/24 and has a turf surface. It measures 2,113 x 100 ft (644 x 30 m). For the 12-month period ending December 31, 2021, the airport had 100 aircraft operations per year, all general aviation. For the same time period, 2 aircraft are based on the field, both single-engine airplanes.

The airport does not have a fixed-base operator, and no fuel is available.

== See also ==
- List of airports in Michigan
