= Grant Airport =

- IATA: none; ICAO: none

Summary
- Airport type: Public
- Owner: Cheryl Koopman
- Serves: Grant, Michigan
- Elevation AMSL: 815 ft (248 m)
- Coordinates: 43°20′30″N 085°46′30″W
- Interactive map of Grant Airport

Runways
Direction	Length		Surface
Direction	ft	m	Surface
9/27	2,517	767	Turf

Statistics (2010)
- Aircraft operations: 600
- Based aircraft: 12
- Source: Federal Aviation Administration

Grant Airport is a privately owned, public use airport located two nautical miles (4 km) northeast of the central business district of Grant, a city in Newaygo County, Michigan, United States. The airport is uncontrolled, and is used for general aviation purposes.

== Facilities and aircraft ==
Grant Airport covers an area of 80 acres (32 ha) at an elevation of 815 feet (248 m) above mean sea level. It has one runway designated 9/27 with a turf surface measuring 2,517 by 120 feet (767 x 37 m).

For the 12-month period ending December 31, 2010, the airport had 600 general aviation aircraft operations, an average of 50 per month. At that time there were 12 aircraft based at this airport, all single-engine.
