= Craft's Field =

- IATA: none; ICAO: none; FAA LID: none

Summary
- Airport type: Public
- Location: Mason, Michigan
- Elevation AMSL: 925 ft / 282 m
- Coordinates: 42°33′57″N 84°30′28″W
- Interactive map of Craft's Field

Runways
Direction	Length		Surface
Direction	ft	m	Surface
9/27	2,590	789	Turf
- Source: Michigan Airport Directory

Craft's Field is a general aviation airport located southwest of Mason in Ingham County, Michigan, United States. The closest highway is US-127, which is approximately 3.5 miles east of the airport. The airport is accessible by road from Edgar Rd.

== Facilities ==
Craft's Field has one runway designated 9/27 with a turf surface measuring 2,590 by 60 feet (789 x 18 m). The airport is closed December through March, and also when snow-covered.
