= Oakland Southwest Airport =

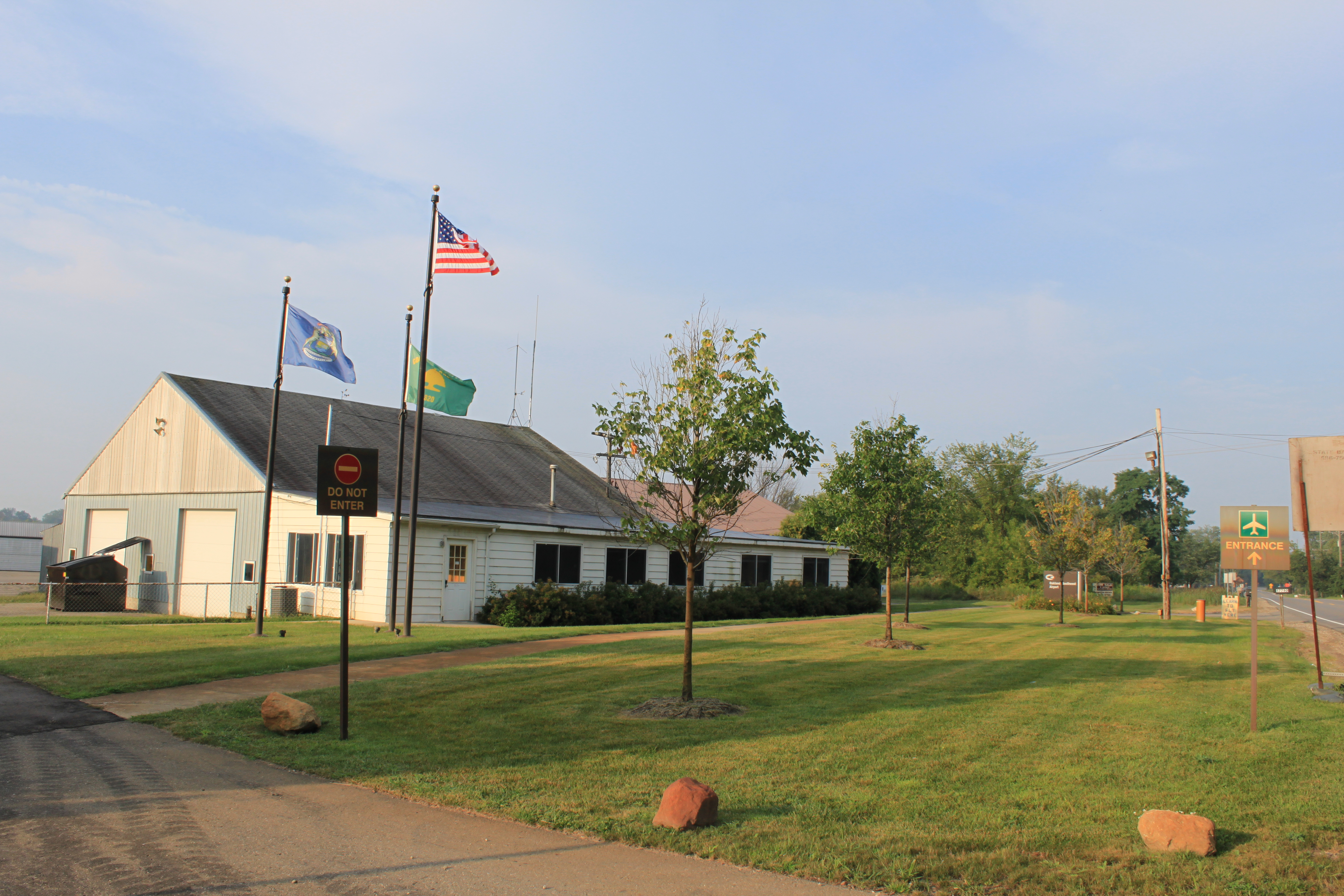
- Airport entrance
- IATA: none; ICAO: none; FAA LID: Y47

Summary
- Airport type: Public
- Owner: Oakland County
- Serves: New Hudson, Michigan
- Elevation AMSL: 926 ft (282 m)
- Coordinates: 42°30′11″N 083°37′25″W
- Website: www.OakGov.com/...

Map
- Location of airport in Michigan Y47 (the United States)

Runways
Direction	Length		Surface
Direction	ft	m	Surface
08-26	3,128	953	Asphalt

Statistics (2021)
- Aircraft operations: 13,140
- Based aircraft: 43
- Source: Federal Aviation Administration

Oakland Southwest Airport (FAA LID: Y47) is a county-owned public-use airport serving New Hudson, in Oakland County, Michigan, United States of America. It is located one nautical mile (1.9 km) southwest from the central business district of New Hudson. This airport is uncontrolled, and is used for general aviation purposes locally.

It is included in the Federal Aviation Administration (FAA) National Plan of Integrated Airport Systems for 2017–2021, in which it is also categorized as a local reliever airport facility.

== History ==
The airport opened in 1946, and which was formerly known as the New Hudson Airport. This airport was originally used for veterans to get their pilot licenses under the G.I. bill. It was later acquired by Oakland County in August 2000.

== Facilities and aircraft ==
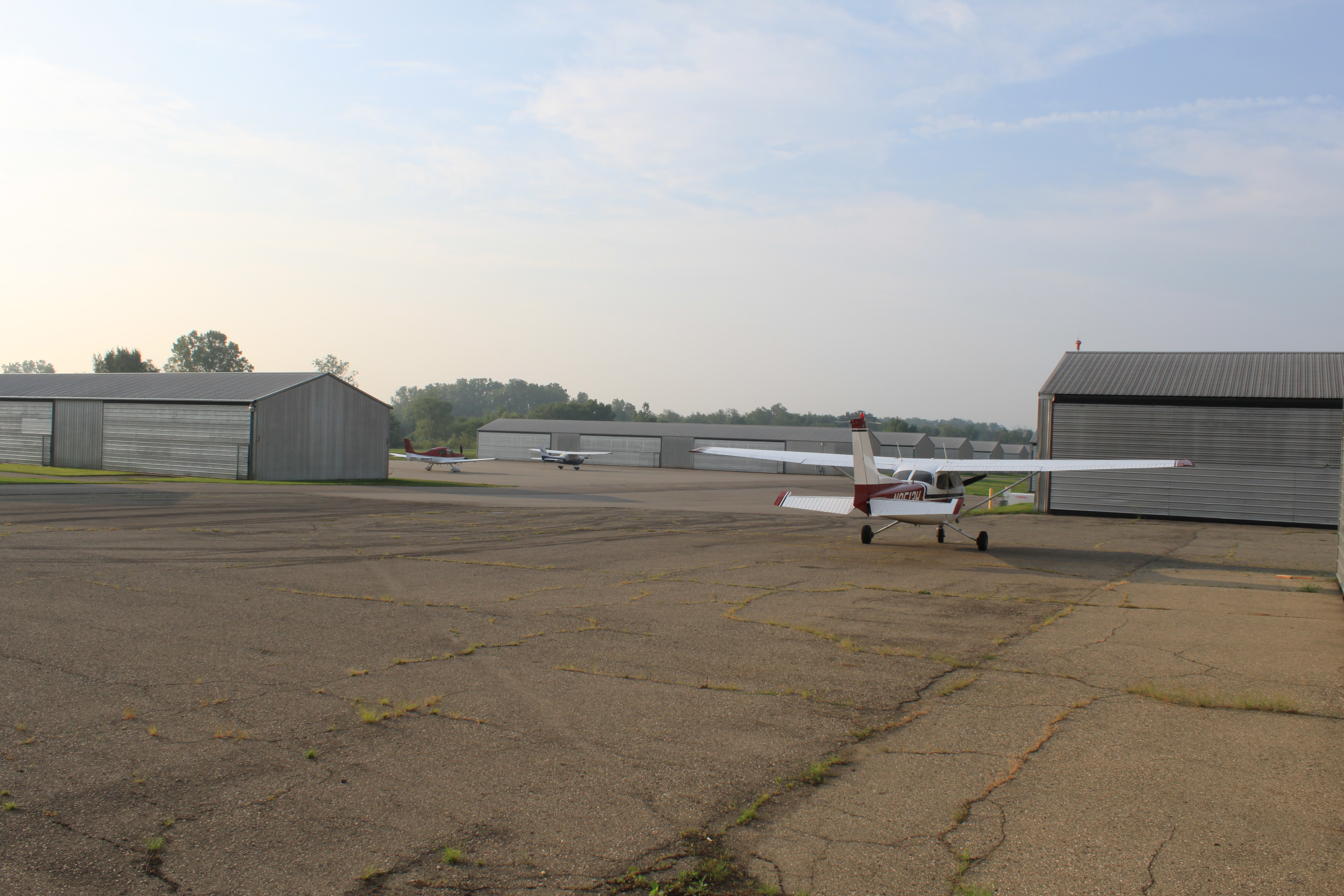
Planes in 67 hangar area

Oakland Southwest Airport covers an area of 67 acres (27 ha) at an elevation of 926 feet (282 m) above mean sea level. It has one runway, designated 08/26. Oakland Southwest Airport has an asphalt surface and measures 3,128 by 40 feet (953 x 12 m).

For the 12-month period ending December 31, 2021, the airport had 13,140 aircraft operations, an average of 36 per day. They are composed entirely of general aviation. At that time, there were 43 aircraft based at this airport: 41 airplanes, 40 single-engine and 1 multi-engine, and 2 helicopters.

The airport has a fixed-base operator that offers fuel, Hangars, courtesy and rental cars, conference rooms, a crew lounge, and more.

== See also ==
- List of airports in Michigan
