= Baraga Airport =

- IATA: none; ICAO: none; FAA LID: 2P4

Summary
- Airport type: Public
- Owner: Gerald Harrington
- Serves: Baraga, Michigan
- Elevation AMSL: 845 ft (258 m)
- Coordinates: 46°47′05.70″N 088°34′40.20″W

Map
- Location of airport in Michigan 2P4 (the United States)

Runways
Direction	Length		Surface
Direction	ft	m	Surface
9/27	2,200	671	Turf

Statistics
- Aircraft operations (2010): 46
- Based aircraft (2010): 0
- Source: Federal Aviation Administration

Baraga Airport (FAA LID: 2P4) is a privately owned public use airport located four miles west of the central business district of Baraga, a city in Baraga County, Michigan, United States.

== Facilities and aircraft ==
Baraga Airport covers an area of 158 acres (0.64 km^{2}) and contains one runway designated 9/27 with a 2,200 x 100 ft (671 x 30 m) turf surface. For the 12-month period ending September 23, 2010, the airport had 46 aircraft operations: 100% general aviation. At that time there were no aircraft based at the airport.
