= Johnson Field (Michigan) =

Airport in Michigan, United States

- IATA: none; ICAO: none; FAA LID: 11G

Summary
- Airport type: Public
- Owner: 3 owners: Beverly Evans since 1989, Emily Widmar (family) 30+ yrs, and William Jackson since 2009
- Serves: Smiths Creek, Michigan
- Time zone: UTC−05:00 (-5)
  - Summer (DST): UTC−04:00 (-4)
- Elevation AMSL: 630 ft (190 m)
- Coordinates: 42°55′16″N 082°35′08″W

Map
- Location of airport in Michigan 11G (the United States)

Runways
Direction	Length		Surface
Direction	ft	m	Surface
7/25	2,530	771	Turf

Statistics
- Aircraft operations (2014): 50
- Based aircraft (2017): 2
- Source: Federal Aviation Administration

Johnson Field (FAA LID: 11G) is a privately owned, public use airport located one nautical mile (1.85 km) northeast of the central business district of Smiths Creek, in St. Clair County, Michigan, United States.

== Facilities ==
Johnson Field covers an area of 6 acres (2.4 ha) at an elevation of 630 feet (192 m) above mean sea level. It has one runway, designated 7/25, with a turf surface and measuring 2,530 by 60 feet (771 x 18 m).

For the 12-month period ending December 31, 2014, the airport had 50 aircraft operations, an average of 4 per month: all general aviation. In January 2017, there were 2 aircraft based at this airport, both ultralights.

== See also ==
- List of airports in Michigan
