= Hastings Airport (Michigan) =

- IATA: none; ICAO: none; FAA LID: 9D9

Summary
- Airport type: Public
- Owner: Hastings City & Barry County
- Serves: Hastings, Michigan
- Elevation AMSL: 801 ft (244 m)
- Coordinates: 42°39′49″N 085°20′47″W

Map
- Location of airport in Michigan 9D9 (the United States)

Runways
Direction	Length		Surface
Direction	ft	m	Surface
12/30	5,003	1,525	Asphalt
9/27	2,380	725	Turf
18/36	1,952	595	Turf

Statistics (2021)
- Aircraft operations: 11,315
- Based aircraft: 81
- Source: Federal Aviation Administration

Hastings Airport (FAA LID: 9D9) is a public use airport located three nautical miles (6 km) west of the central business district of Hastings, a city in Barry County, Michigan, United States. It is owned by the city and county and is also known as Hastings City/Barry County Airport.

It is included in the Federal Aviation Administration (FAA) National Plan of Integrated Airport Systems for 2017–2021, in which it is categorized as a local general aviation facility.

The airport is home to flight schools and a skydiving facility. It hosts a variety of events such as pancake breakfasts, antique aircraft fly-ins, and cookouts.

== Facilities and aircraft ==
Hastings Airport covers an area of 270 acres (109 ha) at an elevation of 801 feet (244 m) above mean sea level. It has three runways, one of which designated 12/30, is asphalt, and measures 5003 by 75 feet (1,525 x 23 m). The other two turf runways are 9/27 which is 2,380 by 170 feet (725 x 52 m) and 18/36 at 1,952 by 200 feet (595 x 61 m).

The airport has a fixed-base operator that offers fuel as well as aircraft parking, courtesy transportation, aircraft charters and maintenance, and more.

For the 12-month period ending December 31, 2021, the airport had 11,315 aircraft operations, an average of 31 per day: 86% general aviation and 13% military. At that time there were 81 aircraft based at this airport: 68 single-engine and 4 multi-engine airplanes as well as 7 helicopters, 1 jet, and 1 glider.

== Accidents and incidents ==
- On May 4, 2002, a Piper PA-38 Tomahawk was substantially damaged during a hard landing at the airport. The instructional flight was returning to the airport to practice landings. On the first approach, the student flared high and drifted left of the runway, and the student executed a go-around. Though the second approach was generally more stable, the student still flared 15-20 feet high and drifted left. Though the student again initiated a go-around, the aeroplane began to sink. The instructor aboard took control and verified all systems were properly configured. The aircraft approached a stall just above the runway, and while the instructor lowered the nose to gain airspeed, the plane continued to sink. The instructor failed to maintain wings level, and the aircraft struck a runway light, touched down off the runway, and struck a cone before the prop dug into the grass. The probable cause was found to be the failure to attain airspeed, inadequate supervision of the flight, and delayed remedial action which resulted in a stall.
- On December 8, 2007, a Cessna 172 Skyhawk crashed while landing at Hastings. The student pilot aboard was practicing takeoffs and landings in icy conditions. During the second landing, the aircraft began to depart the left side of the runway and the student pilot attempted to apply right rudder and right brake, but it had no effect. The airplane departed the left side of the runway and nosed over when the airplane impacted a shallow drainage ditch. The probable cause was found to be the student pilot's failure to maintain directional control during landing. Contributing factors include the ditch and the icy runway.
- On August 16, 2013, a man was airlifted to a hospital after a skydiving accident at the airport. Witnesses reported the jumper's parachute deployed, and details about what caused the accident were not immediately clear. After being instructed to make several turns, the Lansing man began to circle and ultimately spiraled out of control.
- On June 30, 2021, a training flight crashed on landing at Hastings due to an engine problem. The aircraft reported engine issues on takeoff and returned to the airport, at which point it ran off the runway and flipped upside down. Neither pilot aboard was injured.

== See also ==
- List of airports in Michigan
