= M-18 (Michigan highway) =

State highway in Michigan, United States

M-18
- M-18 highlighted in red

Route information
- Maintained by MDOT
- Length: 77.530 mi (124.772 km)
- Existed: c. July 1, 1919–present

Major junctions
- South end: US 10 near North Bradley
- M-61 at Gladwin; M-55 at Prudenville; I-75 near Roscommon
- North end: M-72 / F-97 near Luzerne

Location
- Country: United States
- State: Michigan
- Counties: Midland, Gladwin, Clare, Roscommon, Crawford

Highway system
- Michigan State Trunkline Highway System; Interstate; US; State; Byways
← M-17	→ M-19
← M-143	M-144	→ M-146

M-18 is a north–south state trunkline highway in the Lower Peninsula of the US state of Michigan. It runs for 77.530 miles (124.772 km) through the central region of the state connecting US Highway 10 (US 10) near North Bradley with M-72 in rural Crawford County near the community of Luzerne. In between, the roadway connects several smaller communities while running through woodlands in both state and national forest areas. Two segments of M-18 run along sections of county boundaries, and one part of the highway forms a component of the business loop for the village of Roscommon.

When the highway was first designated in the late 1910s, it extended farther south than it does today and ended well short of its current northern terminus. The southern end was added to another state highway, truncating M-18's length to roughly its current southern terminus in 1926. The northern end was also simultaneously extended for the first time with these revisions to the highway's routing. In the 1940s, the northern extension was reversed and then reinstated. M-18's course was last changed with the opening of three different freeways in the area in the 1960s and 1970s. The last extension in 1973 supplanted the M-144 designation from Roscommon north to Luzerne.

== Route description ==
M-18 begins about 20 miles (32 km) northeast of Mount Pleasant at the North Bradley interchange on US 10 in rural Midland County. The highway runs due north through woodlands that are a part of the Au Sable State Forest and into Gladwin County. The trunkline enters the community of Beaverton and turns northwest to cross the section of the Tobacco River known as Ross Lake. Continuing northwesterly, the road runs along a section of the lake and then turns back due northerly. North of Beaverton, M-18 runs through some farm fields as it approaches the county seat of Gladwin. The highway runs through the southwestern outskirts of town near a golf course as it approaches a junction with M-61. M-18 merges with, and runs concurrently along, M-61 eastward into town on Cedar Avenue. At Silverleaf Street, M-18 turns back north near the airport. M-18 continues northward out of town back into farm country.

The highway turns westward along Wirtz Road and past the southern terminus of county road F-97 in the northern part of Gladwin County. Near a crossing with the Cedar River, M-18 turns north along Bard Road and then west again along Renas Road. The highway returns to its northerly course when it turns to run along Clarwin Road, which runs along the Clare–Gladwin county line. The roadway angles to the northwest briefly, cutting across the extreme northeast corner of Clare County as the highway crosses into Roscommon County. Through the southern portion of the county, the road runs through the Roscommon forest management unit of the Au Sable State Forest as it approaches Prudenville. In that community, M-18 turns northeasterly and runs along M-55 along the eastern shore of Houghton Lake. The two highways separate on the eastern edge of town, and M-18 turns northward, intersecting the northern end of M-157. M-18 continues north, parallel to Interstate 75 (I-75) near Higgins Lake; M-18 crosses I-75 at exit 239 south of Roscommon. The main entrance to Backus Creek State Game Area is located along this stretch of M-18 just south of I-75.

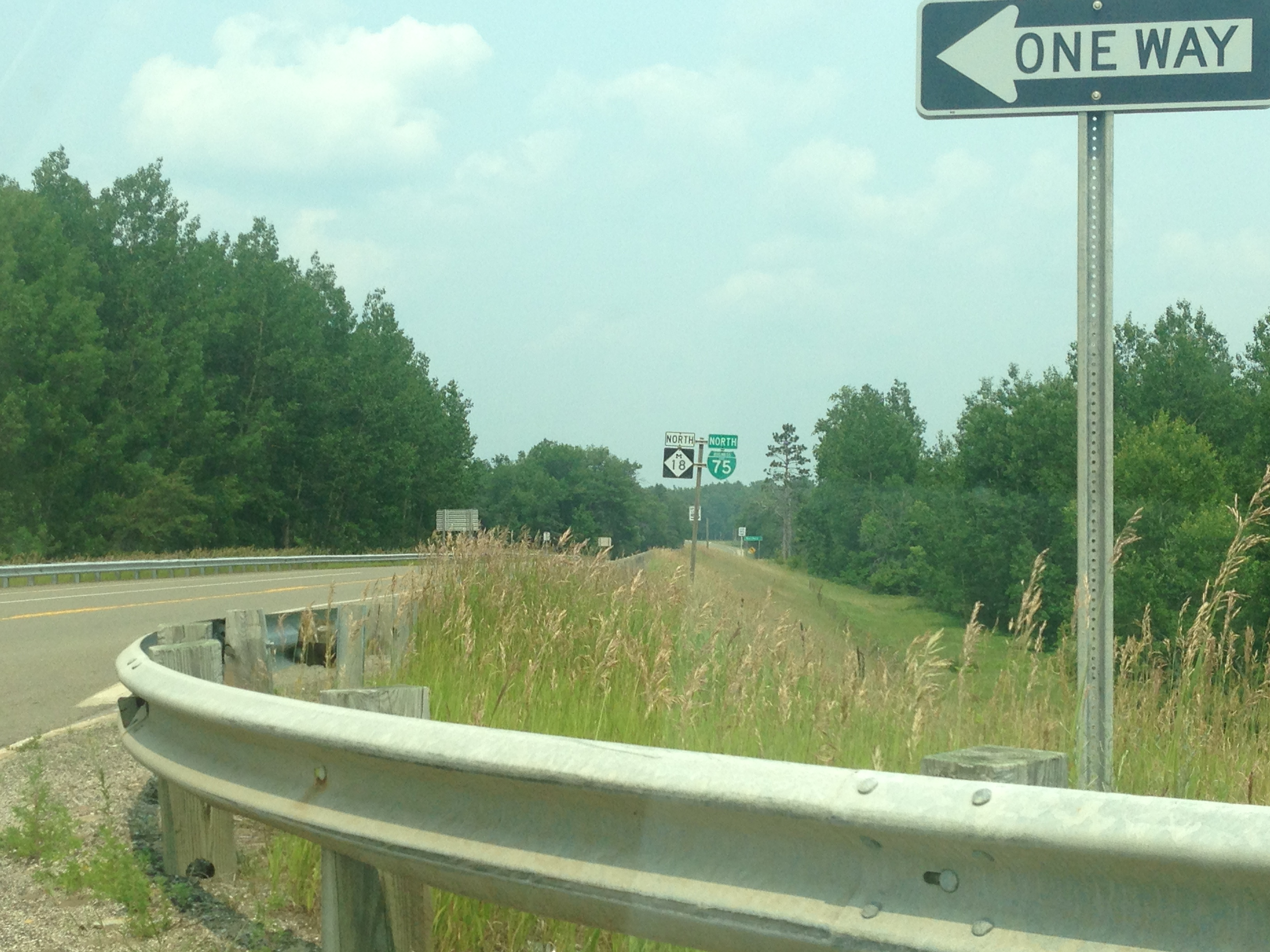
M-18 looking northbound at the southern terminus of BL I-75 south of Roscommon

North of this freeway interchange, M-18 is also the route of Business Loop I-75 (BL I-75). The combined BL I-75/M-18 runs north near the Roscommon Conservation Airport and turns northeasterly into town. In the middle of Roscommon, BL I-75 turns northwest along Old 76 Road, and M-18 continues northeasterly across a line of the Lake State Railway. The highway continues independently to the northwest over the South Branch of the Au Sable River and out of town. It then turns due east along the Roscommon–Crawford county line. This section of the county line also forms the southern boundary of the Huron National Forest. M-18 curves to the northeast off the county line into the national forest territory where it meets F-97 for a second time. At this junction, F-97 merges with M-18 and the two roads run due north to a junction with M-72 west of Luzerne. At this intersection, F-97 continues north and M-18 terminates in rural Crawford County.

M-18 is maintained by the Michigan Department of Transportation (MDOT) like all other state trunkline highways. As a part of these maintenance responsibilities, the department tracks the traffic volumes along the roads under its jurisdiction using a measurement called annual average daily traffic (AADT). This is a metric for the level of traffic along a roadway segment for any average day of the year. In 2009, MDOT calculated that 14,017 vehicles used the section of M-18 along the M-61 concurrency, the highest traffic levels along M-18. The lowest AADT was found along the highway in Crawford County in the 2009 surveys. Commercial traffic varied between the 50 trucks daily in Crawford County and the 214 trucks a day north of Gladwin. No section of M-18 has been listed on the National Highway System, a network of roads important to the country's economy, defense, and mobility.

== History ==
By July 1, 1919, M-18 was first designated on a routing that ran between M-46 west of Merrill through Edenville to M-14 (later US 27) in Prudenville. The highway south of Beaverton was realigned to run due south a new terminus at North Bradley along the new US 10 in late 1926. The former routing between Beaverton and M-30 north of Edenville was redesignated M-80, and the highway from the M-30 junction south to M-46 became an extended M-30. At the same time, the north end was extended along US 27 to end at M-76 in Roscommon. The northern extension was scaled back in 1941 to Prudenville.

M-144
- Location: Roscommon–Luzerne
- Length: 15.078 mi (24.266 km)
- Existed: 1940–1973

When the new alignment for US 27 was opened in early 1949, M-18 was re-extended north from Prudenville to Roscommon, where it turned northwesterly with M-76 to end at US 27 south of Grayling. The completion of two freeways in the state shifted the termini of M-18 slightly in 1961. The southern terminus was moved north about a mile (1.6 km) to the new US 10 freeway, and the northern terminus was also shifted north about a mile to the new I-75/US 27 freeway. The Michigan Department of State Highways completed a freeway segment in 1970 in the Roscommon area for the modern I-75; in a temporary assignment they moved M-18/M-76 onto that freeway. When the remainder of the freeway for I-75 was completed between Roscommon and West Branch in 1973, M-18 was rerouted at Roscommon to run northeasterly over the routing of M-144, a highway that had existed since 1940. Part of the former M-18/M-76 routing on the northwestern side of Roscommon was used for BL I-75.

== Major intersections ==
County	Location	mi	km	Destinations	Notes
Midland	Warren Township – Edenville Township	0.000	0.000	US 10 – Clare, Midland	Exit 109 on US 10
Gladwin	Gladwin	17.889	28.790	M-61 west (Cedar Avenue) – Harrison	Western end of M-61 concurrency
Gladwin	Gladwin	18.826	30.298	M-61 east (Cedar Avenue) – Standish	Eastern end of M-61 concurrency
Gladwin	Sherman Township	25.524	41.077	F-97 north (Round Lake Road)	Southern terminus of F-97
Clare	No major junctions				
Roscommon	Denton Township	47.006	75.649	M-55 west (West Houghton Lake Drive) – Houghton Lake	Western end of M-55 concurrency
Roscommon	Denton Township	48.073	77.366	M-55 east (West Branch Road) – West Branch	Eastern end of M-55 concurrency
Roscommon	Backus Township	49.901	80.308	M-157 south – West Branch	Northern terminus of M-157
Roscommon	Higgins Township	59.426– 59.486	95.637– 95.733	I-75 – Saginaw, Mackinac Bridge BL I-75 north	Southern end of BL I-75 concurrency at exit 239 on I-75
Roscommon	Roscommon	62.452	100.507	BL I-75 north (5th Street)	Northern end of BL I-75 concurrency; former M-76
Crawford	South Branch Township	73.178	117.769	F-97 south – St. Helen	Southern end of F-97 concurrency
Crawford	South Branch Township	77.530	124.772	M-72 – Grayling, Harrisville F-97 north	Northern terminus; northern end of F-97 concurrency
1.000 mi = 1.609 km; 1.000 km = 0.621 mi: Concurrency terminus
