= Backus Creek State Game Area =

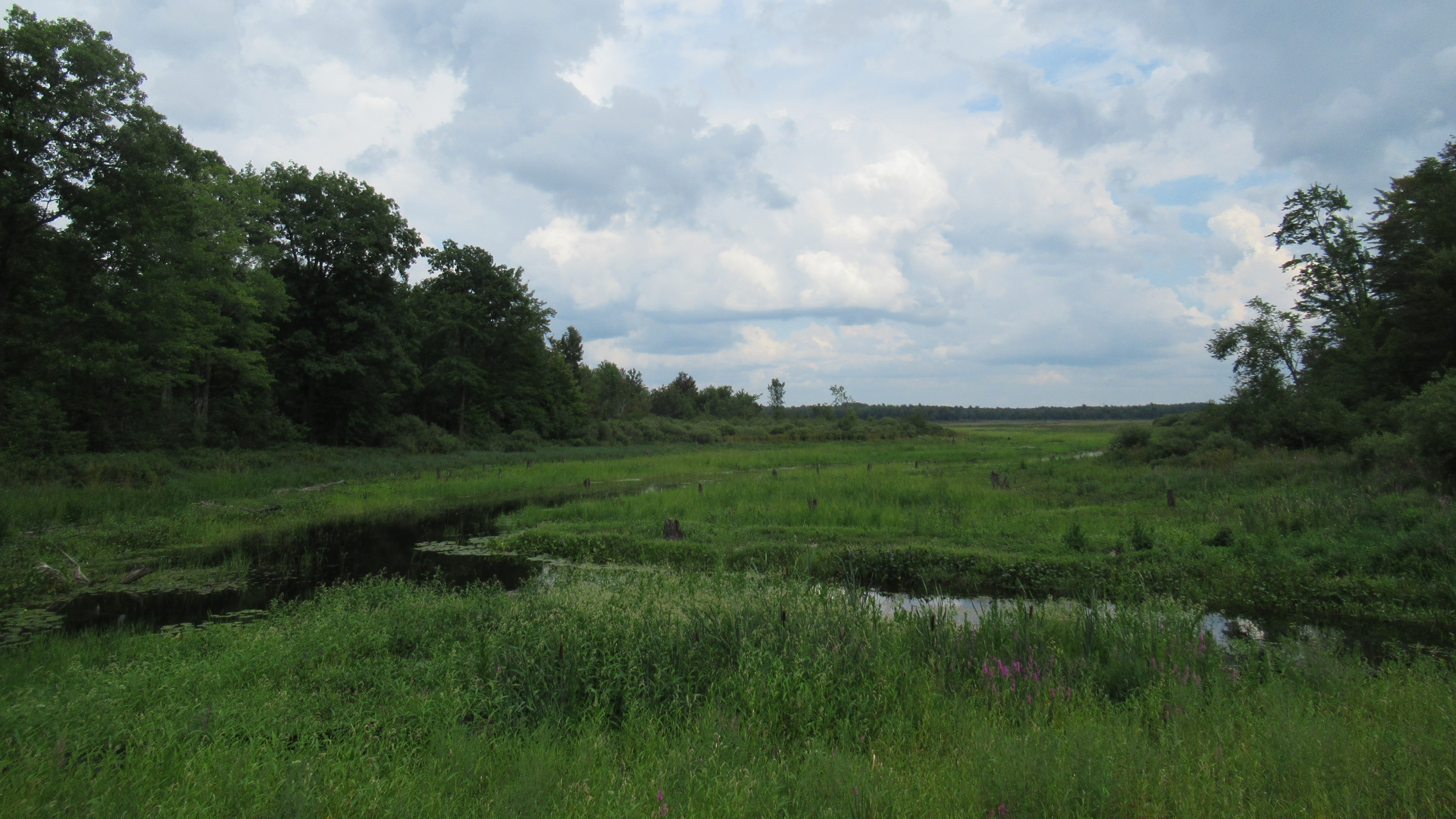
- Looking south from the Backus Creek Dam

- Location within Michigan Location within the United States
- Location: Roscommon County, Michigan
- Nearest city: West Branch, Michigan
- Coordinates: 44°20′43″N 84°35′42″W
- Area: 4,379 acres (1,772 ha)
- Elevation: 1,158 ft (353 m)
- Established: 1954
- Governing body: MDNR

Backus Creek State Game Area is a state game area within Roscommon County in the U.S. state of Michigan. It incorporates 4,379 acres (17.72 km^{2}) of hunting, recreational, and protected wildlife and wetland areas of rural Backus Township and Higgins Township. Backus Creek State Game Area is administered by the Michigan Department of Natural Resources (MDNR).

== Location ==
Backus Creek State Game Area is centrally located within Roscommon County in the north-central portion of the Lower Peninsula. The area contains three dams and receives its water source from Backus Creek, which itself flows into the Cut River and eventually to Houghton Lake. The state game area is mostly surrounded by undeveloped state forest lands, which are part of the Roscommon section of the Au Sable State Forest. Only a small portion along the western boundary consists of private property.

It is accessible by several unmaintained dirt roads, with the main entrance being Backus Creek Road off M-18 (North Roscommon Road). Interstate 75 (I-75) forms the northeastern boundary of the state game area. M-55 and M-157 are to the south but not within the area's boundaries. The state game area's headquarters are located at the Roscommon DNR Service Center and Wildlife Office at 8717 North Roscommon Road to the north at exit 239 off I-75 (M-18 and BL I-75). The nearest sizable communities include Prudenville and Houghton Lake to the southwest and St. Helen to the northeast. The village of Roscommon is located 10 miles (16 km) to the north, and West Branch is the nearest incorporated city 20 miles (32 km) to the east.

Located four miles (6.4 km) to the south, the Denton Creek Flooding State Wildlife Management Area is the next nearest unit managed by the Michigan Department of Natural Resources. Backus Creek State Game Area is one of 12 state game and wildlife areas located within Roscommon County.

== History ==
Prior to state ownership, the land was under single private ownership. The Backus Lake Dam was first constructed in 1937 and created the artificial wetlands.

The surrounding land was purchased by the state of Michigan through a grant allocated by the Pittman–Robertson Federal Aid in Wildlife Restoration Act. The state game area was dedicated on October 13, 1954. Soon after its establishment, two additional dams were constructed in 1956 to expand the artificial wetlands to enhance the recreational area. In 2008, the state game area was expanded to include the southern Backus Lake Flooding near the original dam, which made the total area approximately 4,379 acres (1,772 ha; 6.842 sq mi).

In 2017, Backus Creek State Game Area was also designated as a Grouse Enhanced Management Site (GEMS). There are currently 19 GEMS in the state of Michigan, which are designated bird hunting locations with advanced mapping and flora identifications. Being designated as a GEMS allowed the state game area to receive improvements in walking trails and mobility for hunters, in which the Backus Creek State Game Area consists of 12 miles (19 km) of maintained walking trails for hunters and hikers. Further mapping identified 60% of the state game area consisting of aspen trees and also an abundance of conifers and tag alders. The area designated as a GEMS extends slightly further than the boundaries of the state game area.

All three dams receive annual maintenance, and in 2019, the Backus Lake Dam and Backus Creek Dam were disabled to provide extensive reconstruction, while the Little Mud Dam remains operational. The water levels within the state game area were significantly reduced, as the two disabled dams have lowered the water level to the natural flow of Backus Creek. The two dams and their dikes were strengthened to provide better water level control. The project was completed by late 2020, in which water levels in the reservoirs were slowly restored. The state game area remained open during the project, although normal hunting and fishing activities were greatly reduced during that time.

== Dams and reservoirs ==
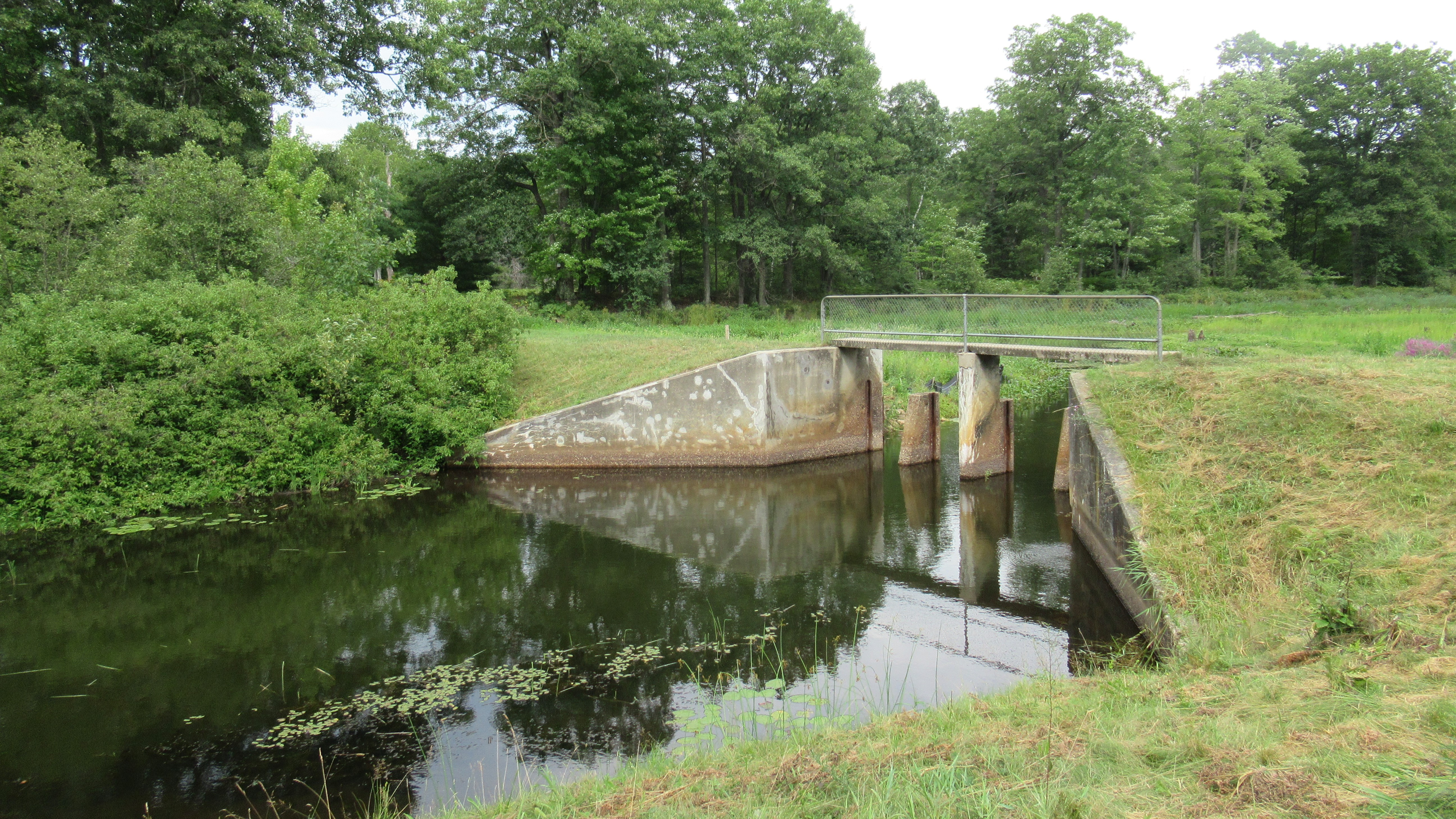
Downstream view of the disabled Backus Creek Dam undergoing reconstruction in August 2020

There are three artificial impoundments within Backus Creek State Game Area, which have expanded Backus Creek and created three subsequent reservoirs. The state game area consists of approximately 1,830 acres (740 ha) of managed wetlands.

The Backus Lake Dam (44°19′50.7″N 84°34′49.2″W) was first constructed further upland in 1937 and led to the creation of Backus Creek. This smaller dam created the uppermost impoundment, known as Backus Lake (or Backus Lake Flooding) at approximately 735 acres (297 ha). This larger impoundment marks the headwaters of Backus Creek and receives its water from natural runoff and the surrounding wetlands. The reservoir is also sometimes referred to as Mud Lake.

The Backus Creek Dam and Little Mud Dam were built in 1956. Both dams are small, nearly identical barrage dams consisting of four spillways that are used for flood control. The Backus Creek Dam (44°20′44.3″N 84°35′41.7″W) is the second dam along Backus Creek, which flows in a northerly direction. Its construction created the Backus Creek Flooding. This reservoir is approximately 485 acres (196 ha). The farthest upstream dam is the Little Mud Dam (44°21′30.8″N 84°36′42.4″W) closer to M-18. Because of this dam's closer proximity to houses, it is considered a "high risk" and requires more frequent inspections. This dam creates Little Mud Lake (or Little Mud Lake Flooding) at approximately 610 acres (250 ha). The water flowing from the Little Mud Dam then flows unimpeded into the Cut River and a short distance to Houghton Lake.

== Activities ==
The state game area provides a mixed-use of activities, while hunting remains the primary recreational activity. Common fauna hunted within the state game area include deer, turkey, bear (black bear), waterfowl, grouse, woodcock, snowshoe hare, and squirrel. Trapping is also permitted and includes beaver, muskrat, mink, and river otter. Coyote, fox, and raccoon can also be trapped in certain areas. The state game area has 12 miles (19 km) of designated walking trails for hunters.

Fishing is also a popular activity but is not a main focus for development of the state game area. The water levels within Backus Creek and flooded areas can vary greatly depending on the time of the year and rainfall amounts. There are two rustic boat launches only suitable for kayaks and smaller canoes. Camping is permitted, although there are no designated camping locations. Hiking, birdwatching, and geocaching are also secondary activities within the state game area.
