= Prudenville, Michigan =

- Census-designated place (CDP) & unincorporated community
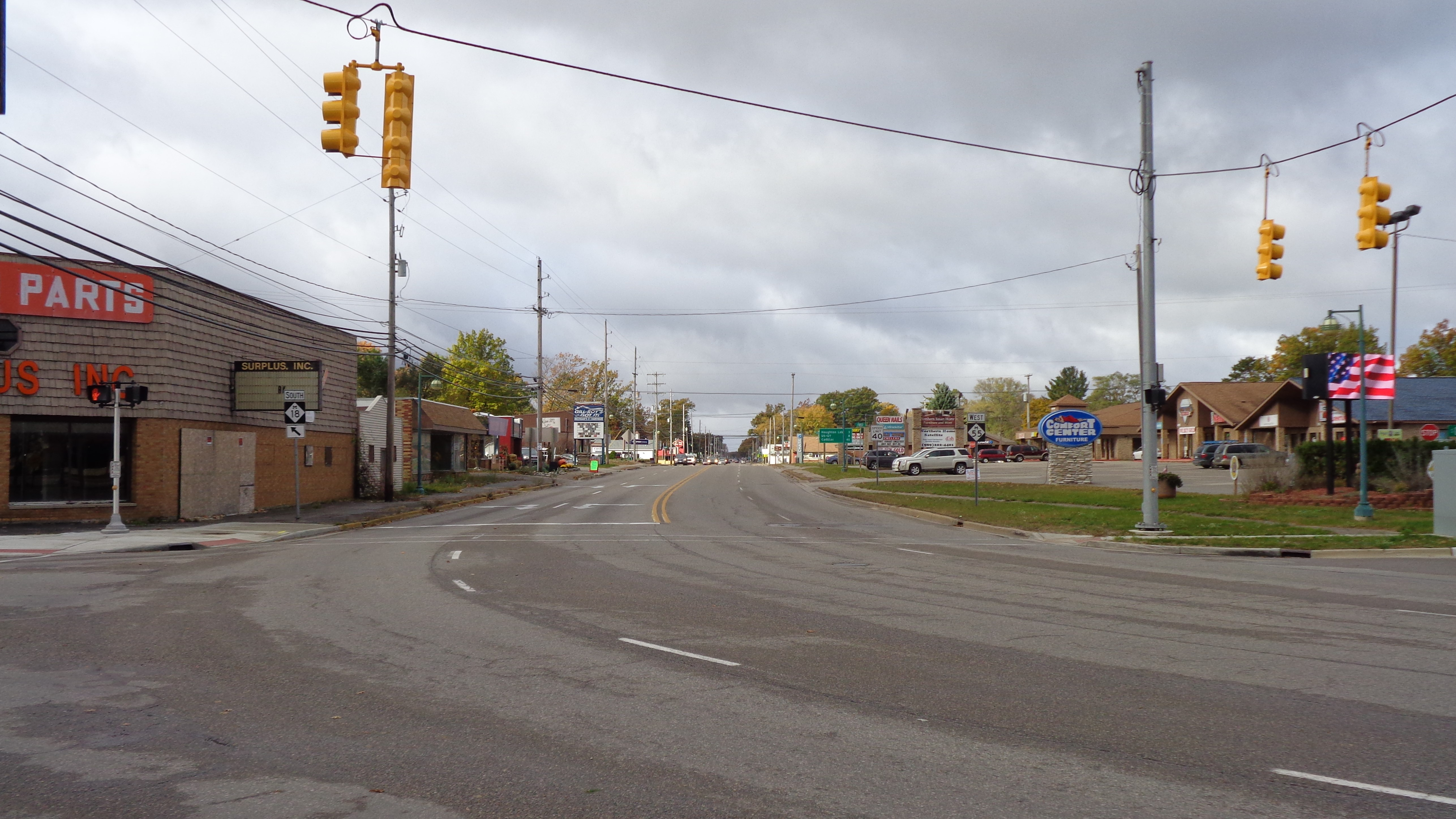
- Looking west along W. Houghton Lake Drive (M-55) at S. Gladwin Road (M-18)

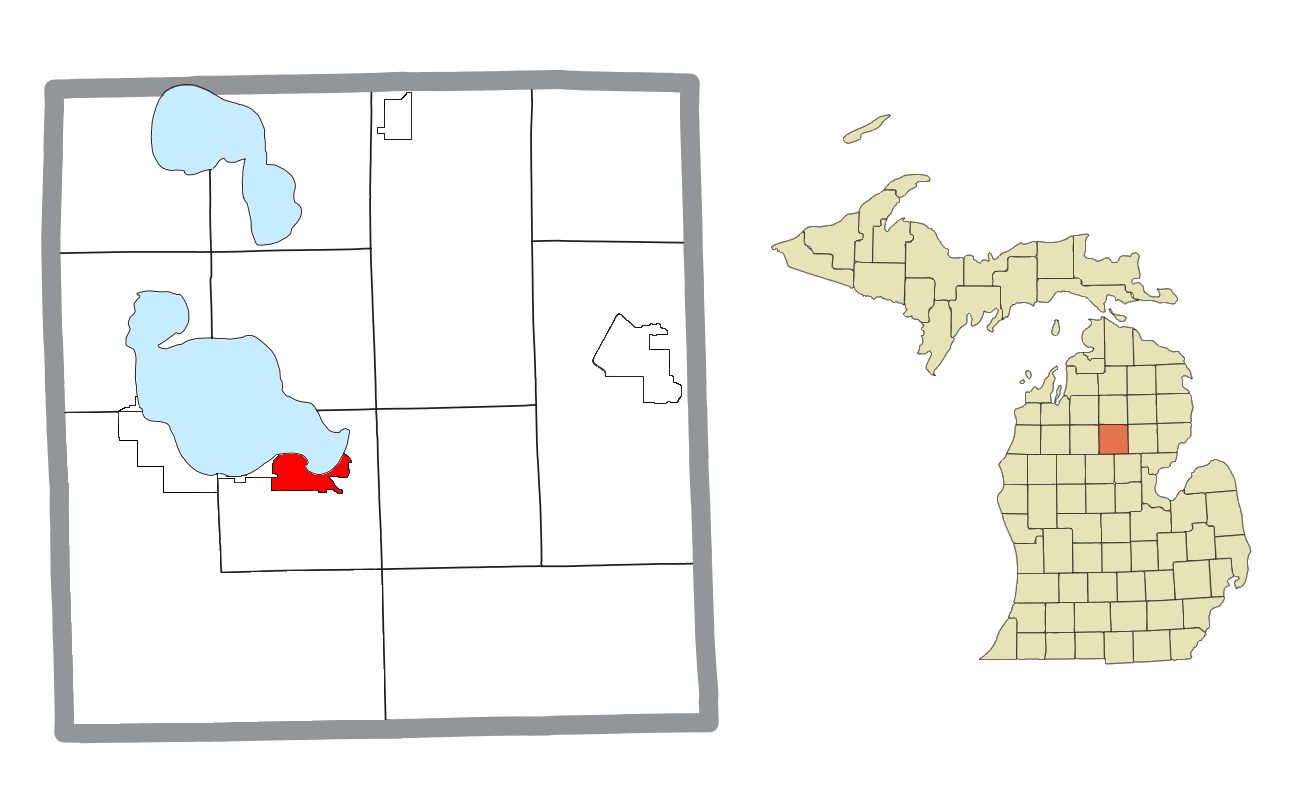
- Location within Roscommon County

- Location within the state of Michigan Prudenville (the United States)
- Coordinates: 44°17′54″N 84°39′07″W
- Country: United States
- State: Michigan
- County: Roscommon
- Township: Denton
- Established: 1875

Area
  - Total: 3.72 sq mi (9.63 km^{2})
  - Land: 2.85 sq mi (7.39 km^{2})
  - Water: 0.86 sq mi (2.24 km^{2})
- Elevation: 1,145 ft (349 m)

Population (2020)
  - Total: 1,643
  - Density: 576.49/sq mi (222.58/km^{2})
- Time zone: UTC-5 (Eastern (EST))
  - Summer (DST): UTC-4 (EDT)
- ZIP code(s): 48629 (Houghton Lake); 48651
- Area code: 989
- FIPS code: 26-66400
- GNIS feature ID: 0635500

Prudenville is an unincorporated community and census-designated place (CDP) in Roscommon County in the U.S. state of Michigan. The population was 1,643 at the 2020 census. Prudenville is located within Denton Township.

== History ==
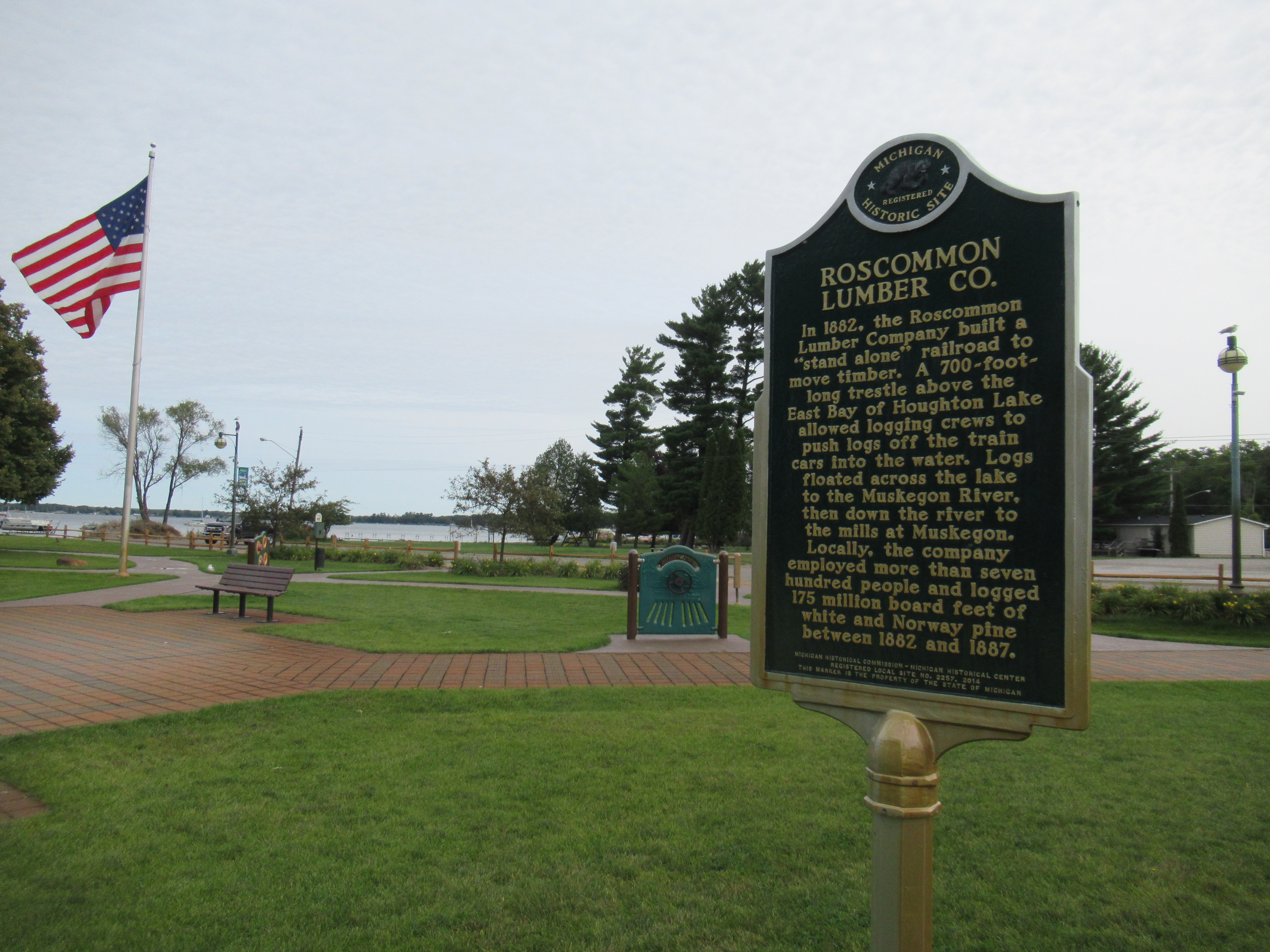
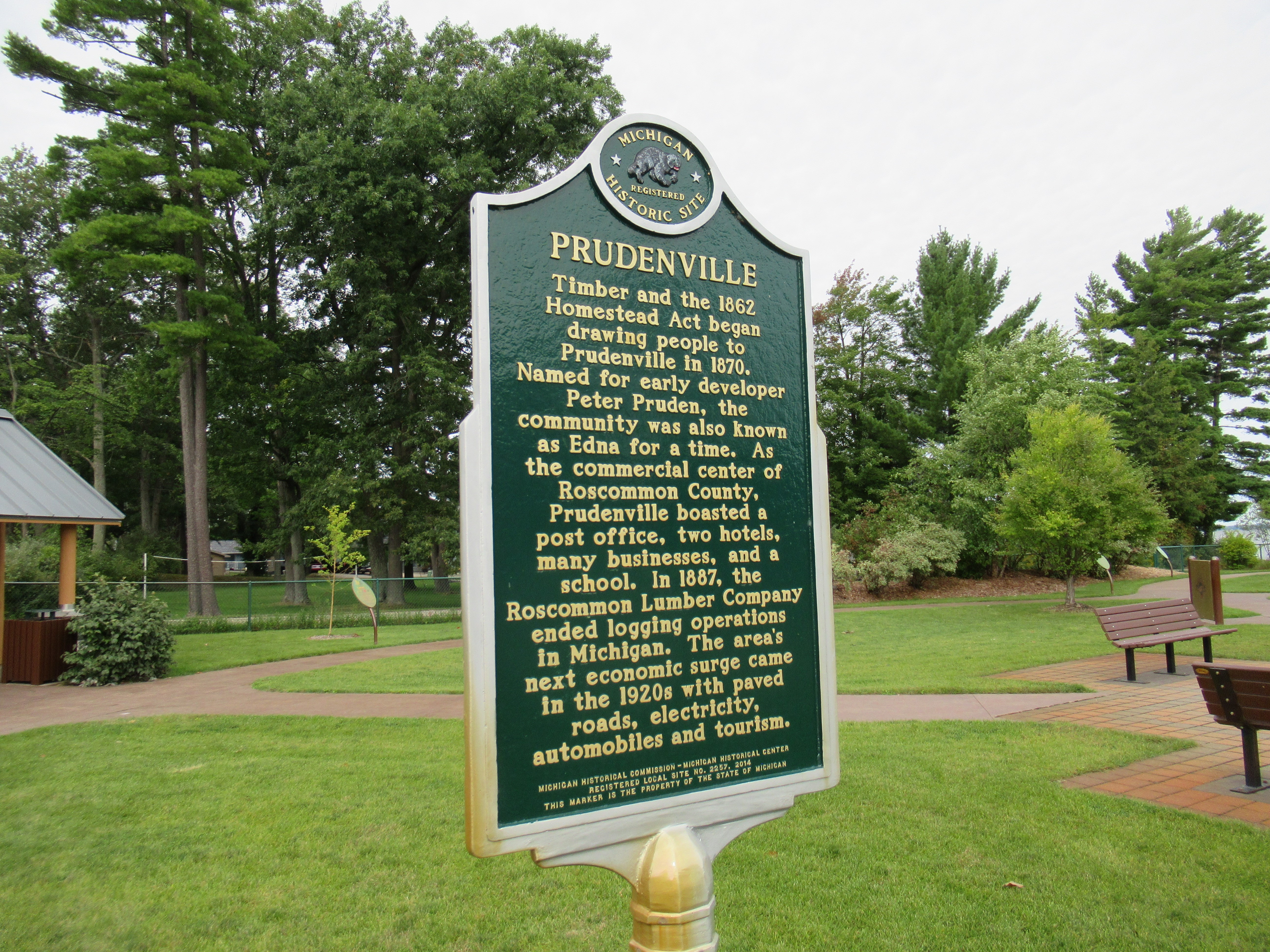
Both sides of the joint Roscommon Lumber Company / Prudenville historic marker in Trestle Park

The area received its first post office on September 6, 1875 under the name Prudenville, and it was soon changed to the name Edna on January 10, 1876. The name Edna existed until it was changed back to Prudenville on January 14, 1886. The Prudenville post office was discontinued on August 15, 1911, but reestablished 10 years later on August 30, 1921. The post office remains in operation and is located at 899 West Houghton Lake Drive (M-55).

The Homestead Act of 1862, which granted free land to travelers moving west, prompted settlers to the Prudenville area in 1870 due to its plentiful lumber resources. The growing community was named after early developer Peter Pruden, and the community grew to include a post office, two hotels, many businesses, and a school. In 1882, the Roscommon Lumber Company built a "stand-alone" trestle railroad to assist logging crews in pushing timber into the east bay of Houghton Lake. The logs were floated across the lake into the draining Muskegon River and further down the river to the mills of Muskegon on the shores of Lake Michigan. During its operation from 1882 to 1887, the company employed 700 workers and logged 175 million board feet of white and Norway pine.

In 2004, the Roscommon Lumber Company and the community of Prudenville were dually listed as a Michigan State Historic Site. A historic marker was dedicated in Trestle Park on September 6, 2014.

== Geography ==
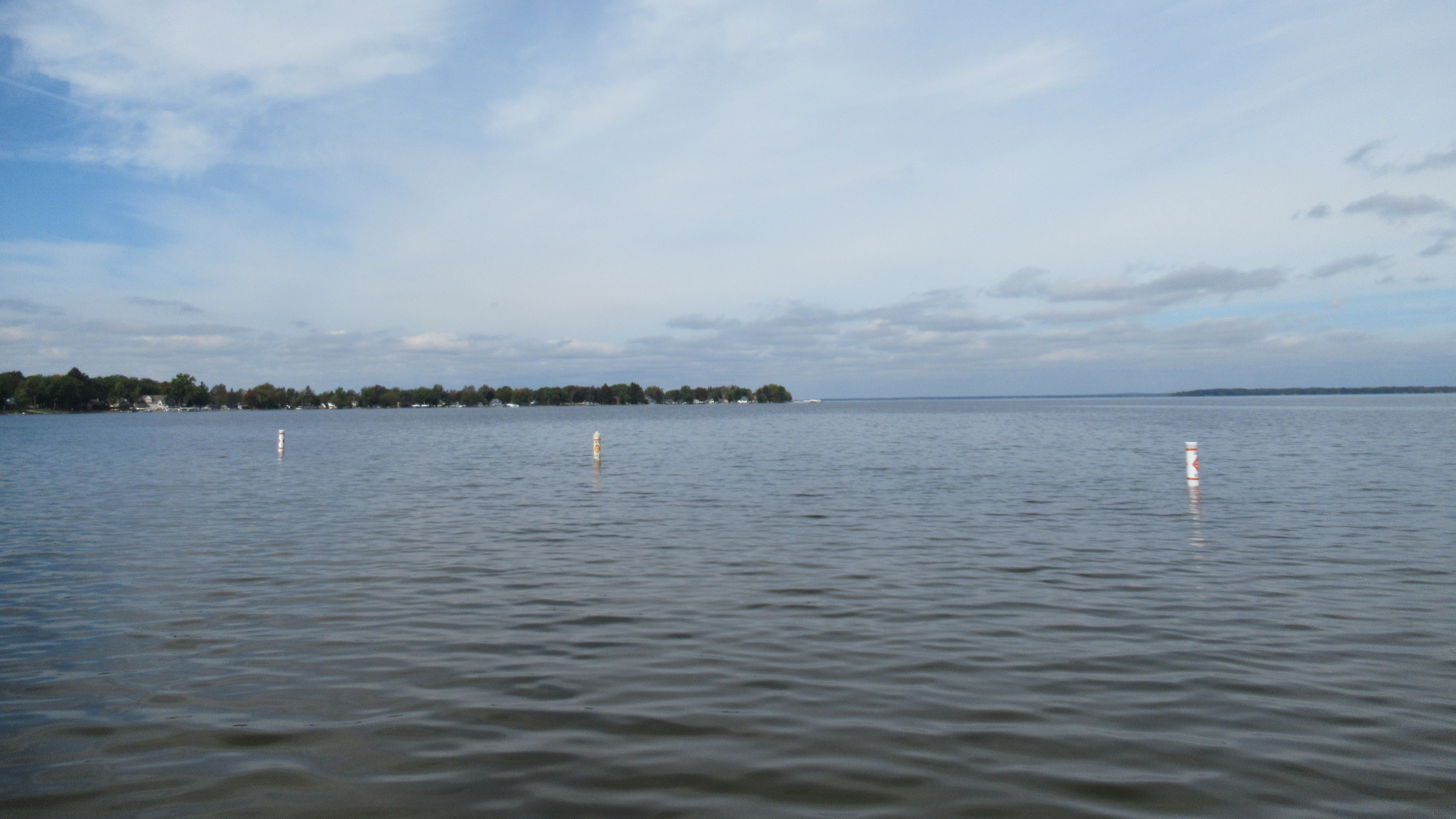
East Bay view of Houghton Lake from Prudenville

According to the U.S. Census Bureau, the CDP has a total area of 3.72 square miles (9.63 km^{2}), of which 2.85 square miles (7.38 km^{2}) is land and 0.87 square miles (2.25 km^{2}) (23.38%) is water.

Prudenville has its own post office with the 48651 ZIP Code. The Prudenville post office serves most of Denton Township and smaller portions of Roscommon Township to the south, Nester Township to the southwest, and Backus Township and Higgins Township to the northeast. Prudenville is an unincorporated community listed by the U.S. Census Bureau as a census-designated place (CDP) for statistical purposes only, and the community itself has no legal autonomy as an incorporated municipality. The western portion of the Prudenville CDP also includes a small portion of the Houghton Lake 48629 ZIP Code.

Prudenville is considered part of the Northern Michigan region. It is located on the southeast shores of Houghton Lake, which is the state's largest inland lake. Portions of the Au Sable State Forest (Roscommon State Forest Management Unit) and Backus Creek State Game Area are within close proximity.

=== Major highways ===
- M-18 is known locally as S. Gladwin Road; briefly runs concurrent with M-55 before continuing north as E. Houghton Lake Drive
- M-55 is known locally as W. Houghton Lake Drive and then exiting under the name W. West Branch Road
- M-157, located just east of the boundaries of the Prudenville CDP

== Demographics ==
Historical population
Census	Pop.	Note	%±
1990	1,513		—
2000	1,737		14.8%
2010	1,682		−3.2%
2020	1,643		−2.3%
U.S. Decennial Census

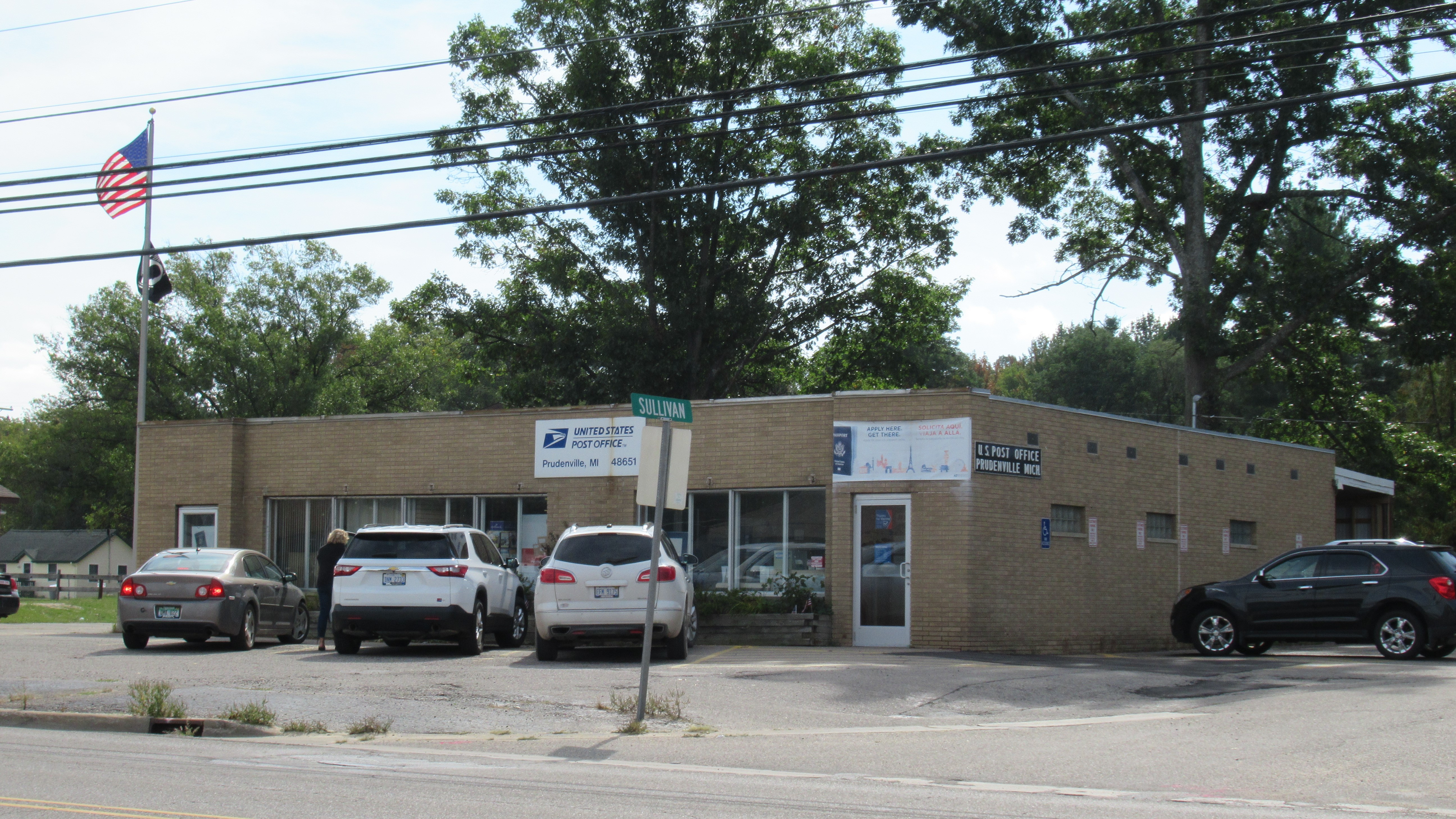
U.S. Post Office in Prudenville

=== 2020 census ===
As of the 2020 census, Prudenville had a population of 1,643. The median age was 56.2 years. 14.8% of residents were under the age of 18 and 33.0% of residents were 65 years of age or older. For every 100 females there were 84.2 males, and for every 100 females age 18 and over there were 81.1 males age 18 and over.

95.6% of residents lived in urban areas, while 4.4% lived in rural areas.

There were 844 households in Prudenville, of which 16.4% had children under the age of 18 living in them. Of all households, 49.1% were married-couple households, 17.2% were households with a male householder and no spouse or partner present, and 24.9% were households with a female householder and no spouse or partner present. About 32.3% of all households were made up of individuals and 16.7% had someone living alone who was 65 years of age or older.

There were 1,573 housing units, of which 46.3% were vacant. The homeowner vacancy rate was 1.8% and the rental vacancy rate was 4.4%.

Racial composition as of the 2020 census
Race	Number	Percent
White	1,515	92.2%
Black or African American	2	0.1%
American Indian and Alaska Native	17	1.0%
Asian	12	0.7%
Native Hawaiian and Other Pacific Islander	0	0.0%
Some other race	2	0.1%
Two or more races	95	5.8%
Hispanic or Latino (of any race)	20	1.2%

=== 2000 census ===
As of the census of 2000, there were 1,737 people, 818 households, and 542 families residing in the CDP. The population density was 620.1 inhabitants per square mile (239.4/km^{2}). There were 1,395 housing units at an average density of 498.0 per square mile (192.3/km^{2}). The racial makeup of the CDP was 98.39% White, 0.12% African American, 0.69% Native American, 0.12% Asian, 0.06% from other races, and 0.63% from two or more races. Hispanic or Latino of any race were 0.52% of the population.

There were 819 households, out of which 18.2% had children under the age of 18 living with them, 55.3% were married couples living together, 7.6% had a female householder with no husband present, and 33.7% were non-families. 30.1% of all households were made up of individuals, and 16.9% had someone living alone who was 65 years of age or older. The average household size was 2.12 and the average family size was 2.58.

In the CDP, the population was spread out, with 17.6% under the age of 18, 5.2% from 18 to 24, 18.9% from 25 to 44, 29.5% from 45 to 64, and 28.8% who were 65 years of age or older. The median age was 52 years. For every 100 females, there were 89.6 males. For every 100 females age 18 and over, there were 84.1 males.

The median income for a household in the CDP was $29,821, and the median income for a family was $36,313. Males had a median income of $34,135 versus $20,625 for females. The per capita income for the CDP was $19,018. About 9.4% of families and 11.6% of the population were below the poverty line, including 25.4% of those under age 18 and 6.1% of those age 65 or over.
