= Au Sable State Forest =

State forest in Michigan, United States

- Map showing state forests in Michigan

- Location within Michigan Location within the United States
- Location: Lower Peninsula, Michigan
- Coordinates: 44.10°N 84.17°W
- Governing body: Michigan Department of Natural Resources

The Au Sable State Forest is a state forest in the north-central Lower Peninsula of Michigan. It is operated by the Michigan Department of Natural Resources.

The Au Sable State Forest is a byproduct of the lumbering boom in Michigan during the late 19th century. Many parcels of old growth timber were stripped of their largest trees. After forest fires had consumed the resulting detritus, the land had no economic value. Typically, it was sold to subsistence farmers or was reverted to the state in lieu of unpaid property taxes.

Today, the Au Sable State Forest is a valuable asset to the state of Michigan. Much of it surrounds the fast-growing communities of Houghton Lake, Higgins Lake and Lake St. Helen adjacent to Interstate 75. In addition, much of the forest is used for wildlife game management and the fostering of rare and endangered species, such as the Kirtland's warbler. Much of the area sits on the "Grayling outwash plain", a unique habitat.

== National Natural Landmarks ==
Two land parcels within the Au Sable State Forest are designated as National Natural Landmarks. See List of National Natural Landmarks.

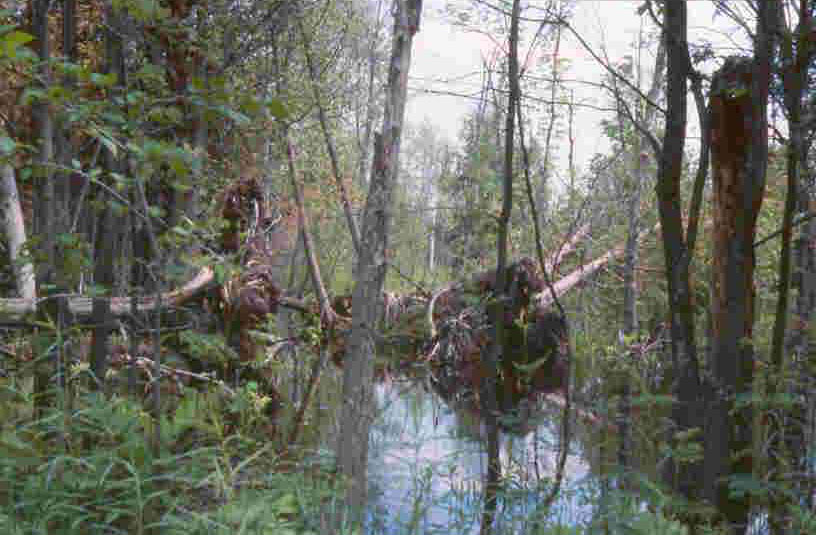
Dead Stream Swamp, a freshwater swamp forest (northern white cedar)

=== Dead Stream Swamp ===
An 11,680-acre (47.3 km^{2}) parcel within the Au Sable State Forest, the Dead Stream Swamp, located 30 miles northeast of Cadillac, is described by its owner/operator, the Michigan Department of Natural Resources and Environment, as "an exceptionally large example of a northern white cedar freshwater swamp forest (Thuja occidentalis), considered to be the climax in bog forest development." The Dead Stream Swamp was designated as a National Natural Landmark in 1976.

=== Roscommon Virgin Pine Stand ===
A 160-acre (650,000 m^{2}) parcel within the Au Sable State Forest, the Roscommon Virgin Pine Stand 8 miles (12 km) north of St. Helen, Michigan, (Location 8 miles east of Roscommon, off Sunset Drive) is an old-growth stand of red pine, which includes a former national champion red pine. Roscommon Virgin Pine Stand was designated as a National Natural Landmark in 1980.

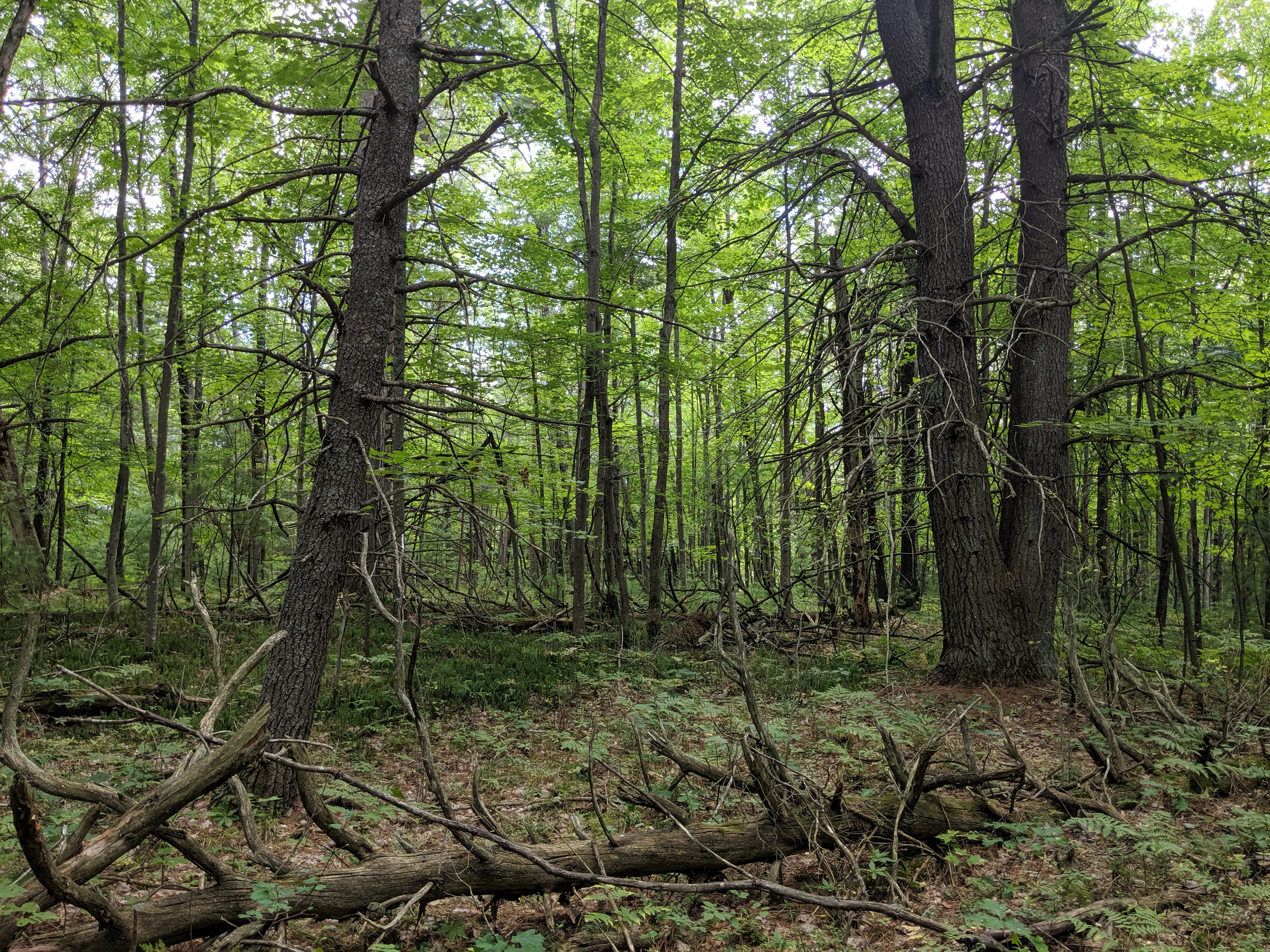
Roscommon red pines

== Other points of interest ==
=== Backus Creek State Game Area ===
Backus Creek State Game Area is a state game area within Roscommon County. It incorporates 4,379 acres (17.72 km^{2}) of hunting, recreational, and protected wildlife and wetland areas of rural Backus Township and Higgins Township.

=== Mason Tract ===
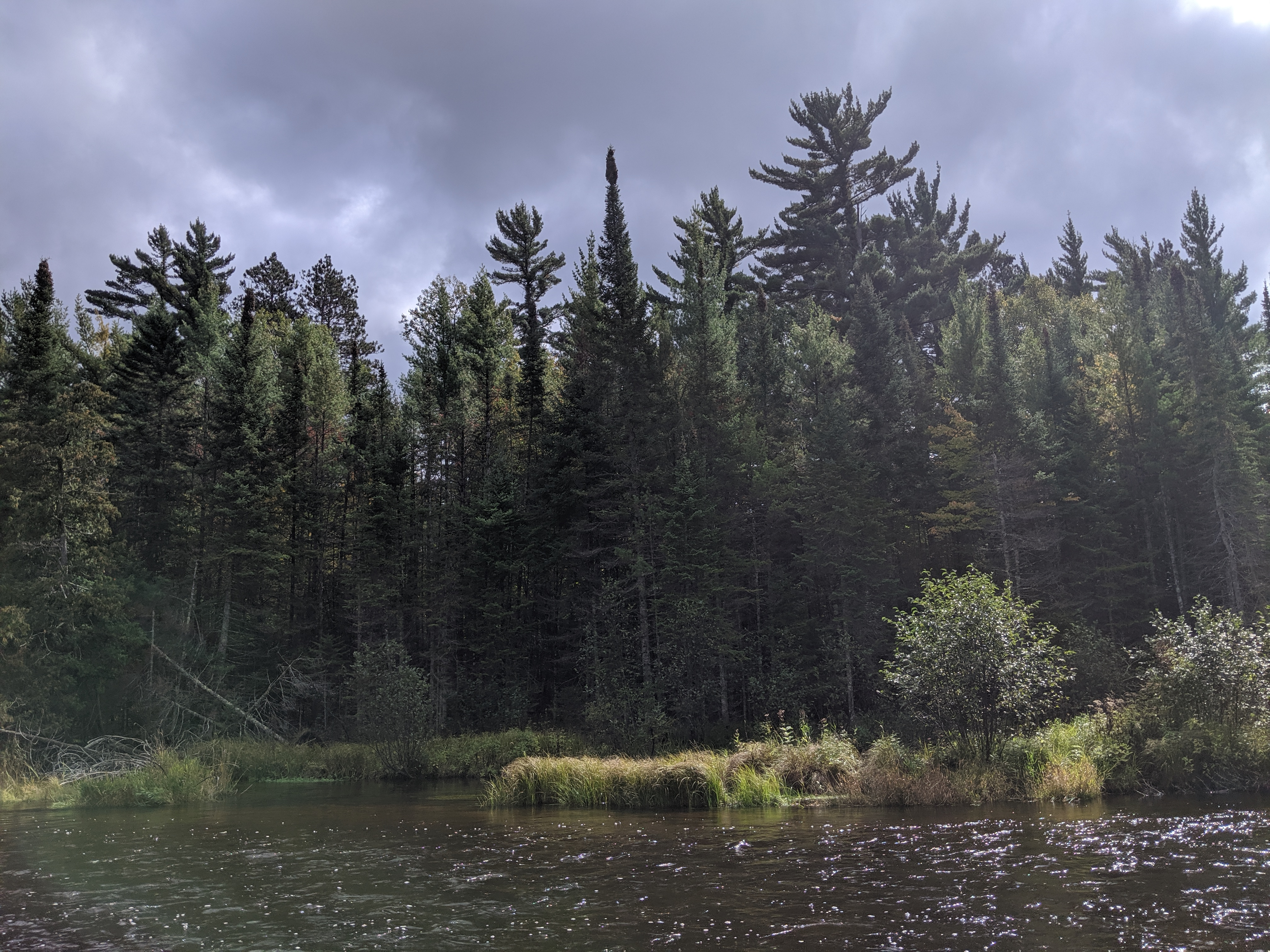
The Mason Tract

The Mason Tract covers a portion of the Au Sable State Forest. It is "a 4,493 acre special management area along the South Branch of the Au Sable River designed to protect the quality fishing waters of this area. The Mason Tract originated from acceptance of a 1500-acre gift from the George Mason family in 1954. Over time, additional acreage has been acquired from the US Forest Service and private individuals through land exchanges. The Mason gift was contingent the area be used as a permanent game preserve, no part shall ever be sold or developed [i.e. natural gas fracking] by the state, and no camping be allowed in the area for 25 years. The State of Michigan has continued the no-camping restriction in the Mason Tract. The only camping allowed is within Canoe Harbor State Forest Campground, located at the north end of the Tract on the Au Sable River. The Mason Tract offers quality fishing, hunting, and canoeing opportunities. The Mason Tract is home to the pristine Mason Chapel. The Mason Family constructed the Chapel in 1960 to provide fishermen with a place of reverence and has developed into a popular tourist attraction. The Mason Tract also contains the Mason Tract Pathway, which is used for hiking and cross-country skiing. Mountain biking on the Mason Tract Pathway is prohibited via a Director’s Order."

== See also ==
- Ogemaw Hills Pathway
