= Henry Stephens (lumberman) =

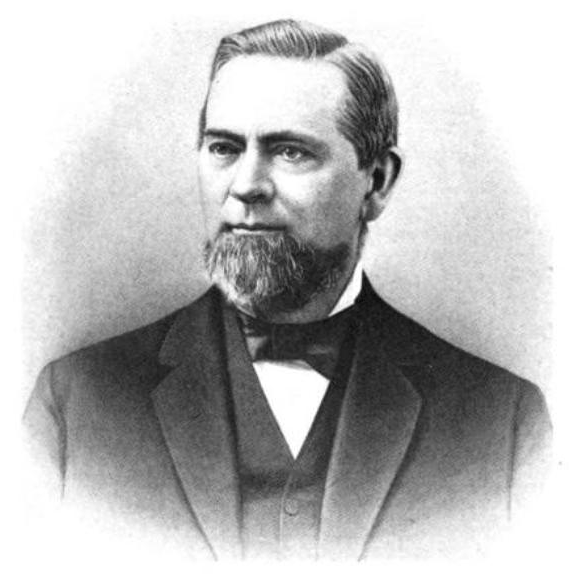
- Born: March 14, 1823; Dublin, Ireland
- Died: February 22, 1886 (aged 62); San Jose, California, United States
- Occupation: Lumberman
- Spouse: Clarinda Leet (m. 1853)
- Children: 3

Henry Stephens (1823–1886) was an Irish-American lumberman, merchant and financier.

== Biography ==
Henry Stephens was born in Dublin, Ireland on March 14, 1823. He lived in Lapeer County, Michigan and was one of Almont, Michigan's earliest settlers, where he established the first mercantile business. North of Lapeer, Michigan, he built a sawmill in 1845. After cutting down and cashing in on those pine forests, he moved to Richfield Township, which is in Roscommon County, Michigan. He built another mill and founded the village of St. Helen, Michigan. He also had a summer home in Romeo.

He married Clarinda Leet on September 20, 1853, and they had three children.

He died in San Jose, California on February 22, 1886.

== Legacy ==
In 1916, Albert Stephens, his youngest son, funded the construction of a library in honor of his father. The following year, a local contractor Al Thayer erected this Georgian Revival building. An addition was erected in 1987. The library is part of the West St. Clair Street National Register Historic District, and is located in Lapeer County. It is memorialized by a Michigan historical marker.
