= MI-18 =

MI-18 may refer to:

- Mil Mi-8, Soviet helicopter
- Michigan's 18th congressional district
- M-18 (Michigan highway)
- MI18 (Directorate of Military Intelligence), an unused or classified section of the United Kingdom Directorate of Military Intelligence
