= Ogemaw Hills Pathway =

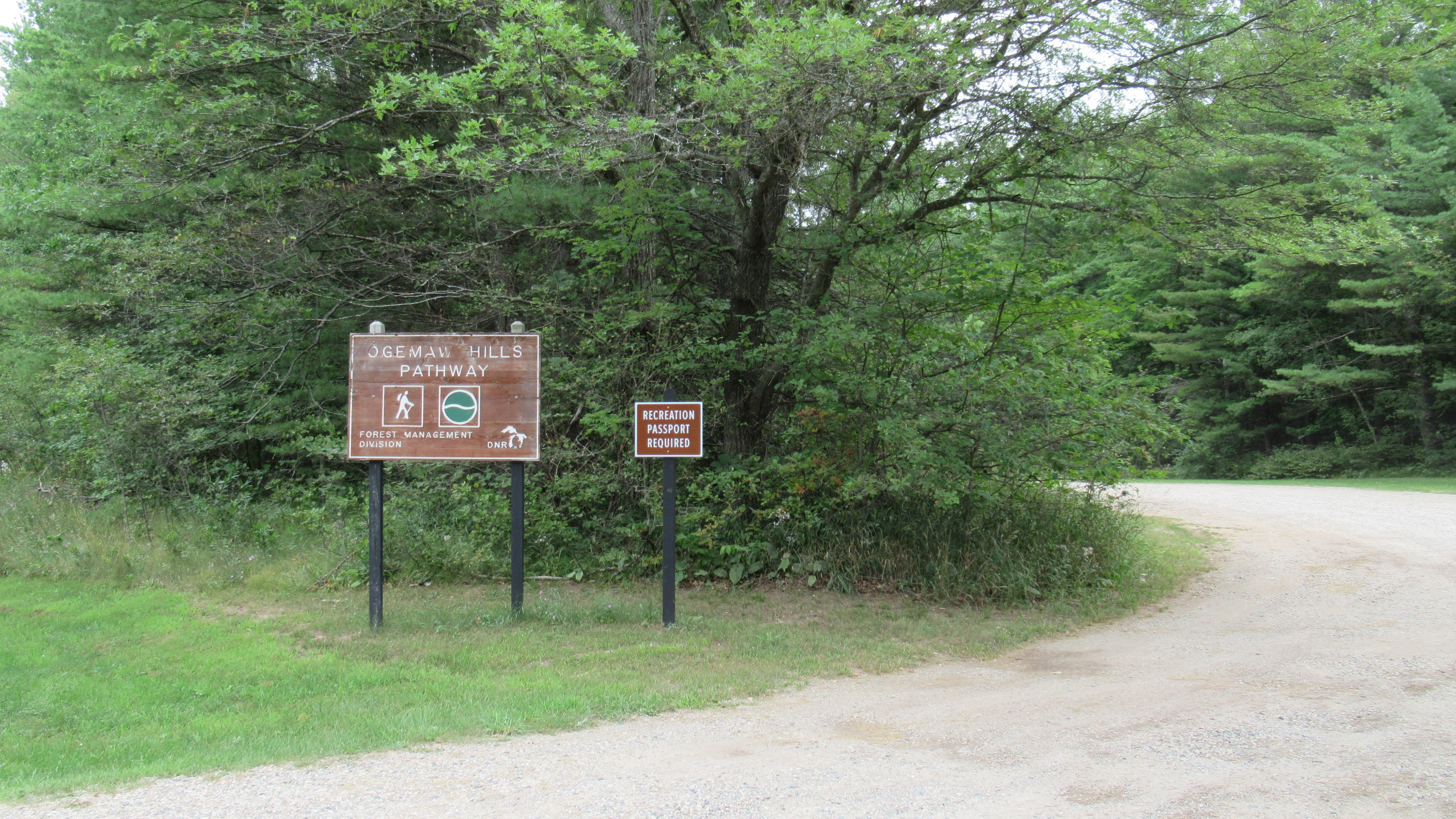
- Fairview Road entrance within Klacking Township

- Location within Michigan
- Location: Lower Peninsula, Ogemaw County, Michigan USA
- Nearest city: West Branch, Michigan
- Coordinates: 44°21′02″N 84°13′33″W
- Governing body: Michigan Department of Natural Resources
- Website: Official website

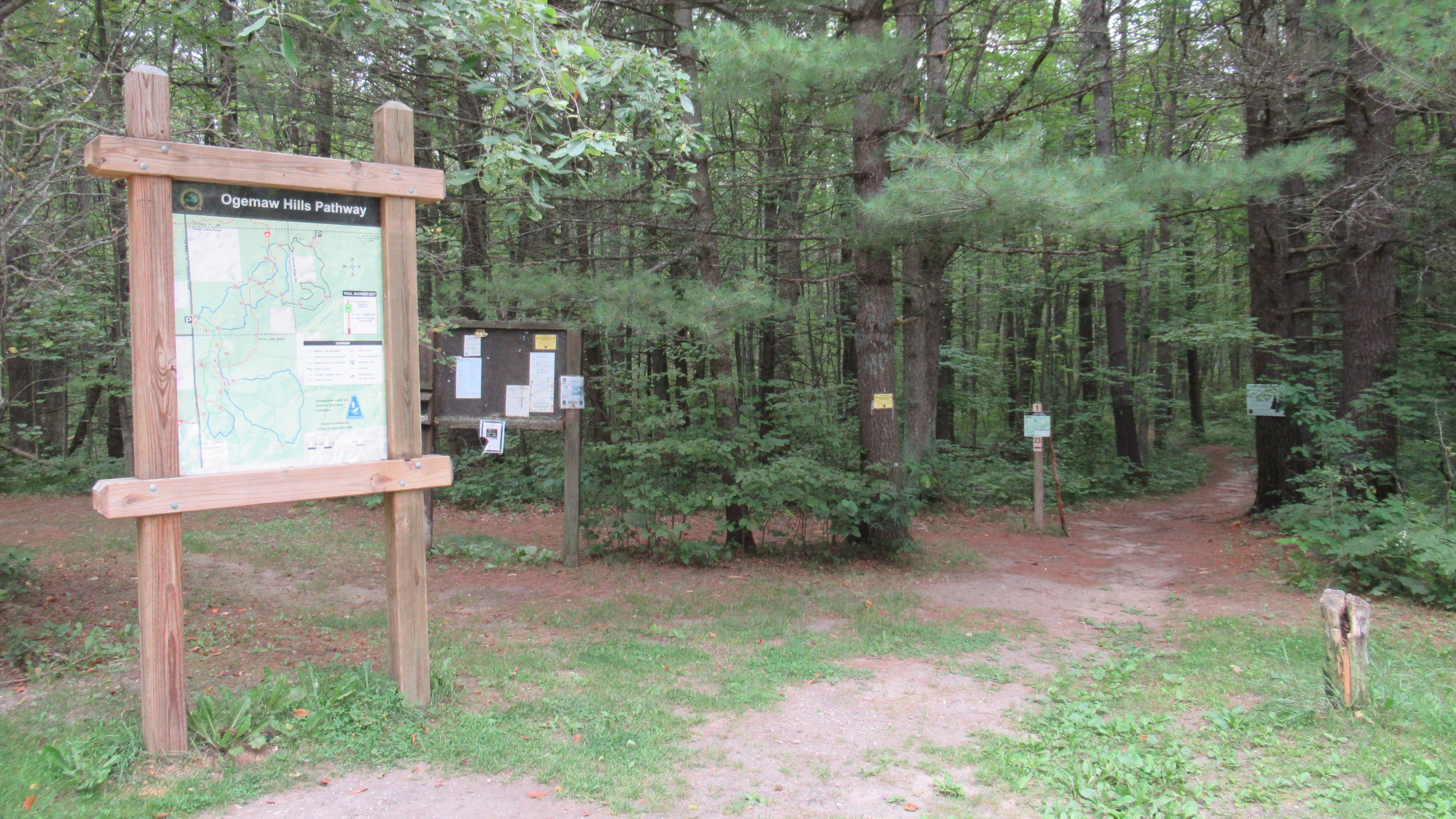
Ogemaw Hills Pathway trailhead

Ogemaw Hills Pathway is a foot-travel pathway located north of West Branch, Michigan within the Au Sable State Forest in Ogemaw County, Michigan. The Pathway offers approximately 15 miles of trails open to hiking, cross country skiing, and biking. The Ogemaw Hills Pathway Council non-profit manages the trail system and grooms the trails for cross country skiing.

Ogemaw Hills Pathway foot-travel pathway designation bans all motorized vehicle travel and equine use of the trail system.

== Geography ==
The Ogemaw Hills Pathway trail system traverses a well defined ridge of hills north of West Branch, Michigan referred to by geologists as the West Branch Moraine, a recessional moraine outwash formed by the Saginaw Lobe of the Laurentide Ice Sheet. The West Branch Moraine marks a northern border of the Pleistocene proglacial Lake Saginaw that formed in front of the melting Saginaw Lobe and retreated into present day Saginaw Bay.

== History ==
Ogemaw State Forest was administratively created in 1914 under the leadership of Michigan State Forester Marcus Schaaf and consisted of 4,160 acres (1,680 ha). A fifty-foot steel fire lookout tower was constructed in the fall of 1914 and the footings are still visible. Grover Zettle was named superintendent of the Ogemaw State Forest in 1914.

Pioneer farmers found the glacial outwash sandy soil poor for farming and many farms were abandoned, reverting to state ownership for non-payment of taxes. Many clearings within the Ogemaw Hills Pathway trail system are old farm fields being reclaimed by the forest and fence lines, rock piles, and foundations can be found.

In 1978 the fifty three state forests were consolidated into six forest Districts and the Ogemaw State Forest became part of the Au Sable State Forest.

== Trail System ==
The trail system features a well defined trail-tread and is blazed by blue triangle markers. The trail system features 26 intersection posts consisting of location number, a trail map, direction of travel arrows, and trail difficulty markers from easiest to most difficult of green circle, blue square, and black diamonds.
