= M-55 (Michigan highway) =

State highway in Michigan, United States

M-55
- M-55 highlighted in red

Route information
- Maintained by MDOT
- Length: 150.944 mi (242.921 km)
- Existed: c. July 1, 1919–present

Major junctions
- West end: US 31 near Manistee
- M-37 near Dublin; US 131 at Cadillac; US 127 near Houghton Lake; I-75 near Prudenville; M-33 near West Branch; M-65 near Whittemore
- East end: US 23 in Tawas City

Location
- Country: United States
- State: Michigan
- Counties: Manistee, Wexford, Missaukee, Roscommon, Ogemaw, Iosco

Highway system
- Michigan State Trunkline Highway System; Interstate; US; State; Byways
← M-54	→ M-56

M-55 is a state trunkline highway in the northern part of the US state of Michigan. M-55 is one of only three state highways that extend across the Lower Peninsula from Lake Huron to Lake Michigan; the others are M-46 and M-72. The highway crosses through rural forest and farmlands to connect Manistee with Tawas City. M-55 crosses two of the major rivers in the state. Two sections of the highway follow along freeways near Cadillac and West Branch. Running for 150.944 miles (242.921 km) through the state, M-55 is maintained by the Michigan Department of Transportation (MDOT).

The highway was first designated by July 1, 1919 along a portion of the current roadway. In a series of extensions, M-55 was lengthened to connect its current endpoints by the early 1930s. The trunkline has been rerouted in sections since that time resulting in the modern roadway alignment. One set of changes produced a business loop in the Houghton Lake area.

== Route description ==
M-55 starts at a three-way intersection with US Highway 31 (US 31) north of Manistee. The trunkline runs southeast on Caberfae Highway over the Manistee River and through the Peters and Highpoint bayous. The highway passes near the community of Eastlake before turning eastward through forest land. In eastern Manistee County, the roadway crosses the Pine River south of the Tippy Dam Pond in Wellston. M-55 intersects M-37 in western Wexford County southwest of the Caberfae Peaks Ski & Golf Resort. The roadway turns northeasterly along the south shore of Lake Mitchell where it then curves southeasterly to run concurrently along M-115 along the south shore of Lake Cadillac and through the south side of Cadillac. At the interchange with the US 131 freeway, M-55 merges north along the freeway, bypassing downtown Cadillac.

On the east side of town, M-55 leaves the freeway and turns east again running through the Pere Marquette State Forest along Watergate Road. When the highway meets M-66, M-55 joins M-66 and runs north through farmland. As the two highways approach Lake City, they run along the shore of Lake Missaukee and through downtown. M-55 turns east again along Houghton Lake Road, separating from M-66 north of the central business district. This section of trunkline passes through mixed farm and wood lands that transitions to mostly forests near Merritt. The road crosses the Muskegon River and follows Lake City Road into the outskirts of Houghton Lake. M-55 passes over the US 127 freeway and enters Houghton Lake Heights. There the highway runs southeasterly along the shores of Houghton Lake into downtown Houghton Lake. M-18 briefly joins M-55 through Prudenville on the east side of the lake, and M-55 follows West Branch Road as it continues east toward Interstate 75 (I-75).

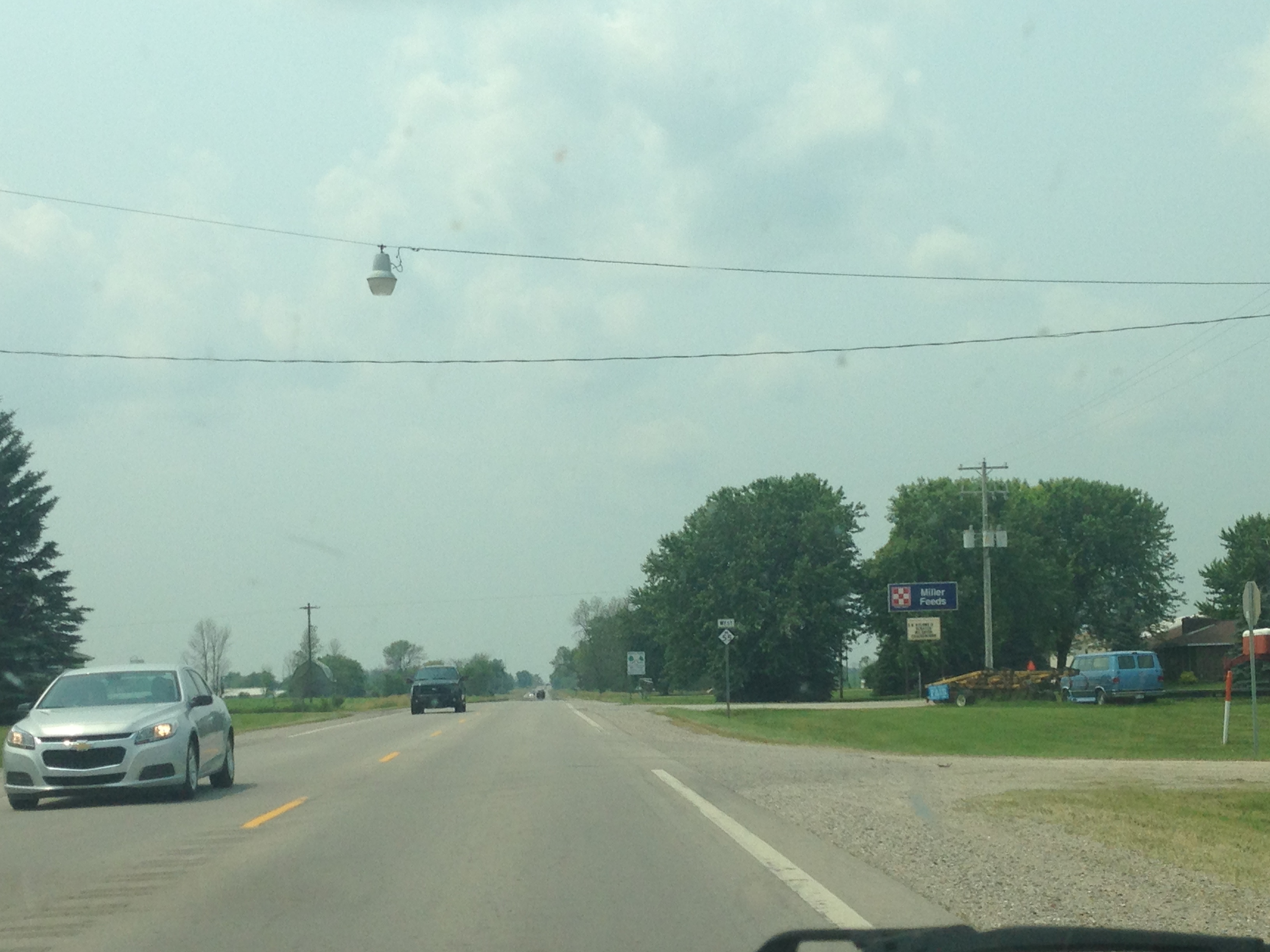
M-55 in Logan Township, Ogemaw County, looking westbound

M-55 follows I-75 between exits 227 and 215, a distance of about 12 miles (19 km). This section is the only part of M-55 that has been listed on the National Highway System, a system of roads important to the nation's economy, defense, and mobility. From the end of the freeway concurrency, M-55 follows Business Loop I-75 (BL I-75) into downtown West Branch. After leaving town, the highway runs through farm lands in rural Ogemaw and Iosco counties. The highway curves southeast into Tawas City. The eastern end of M-55 is at an intersection with US 23 along the shores of the Tawas Bay of Lake Huron.

== History ==
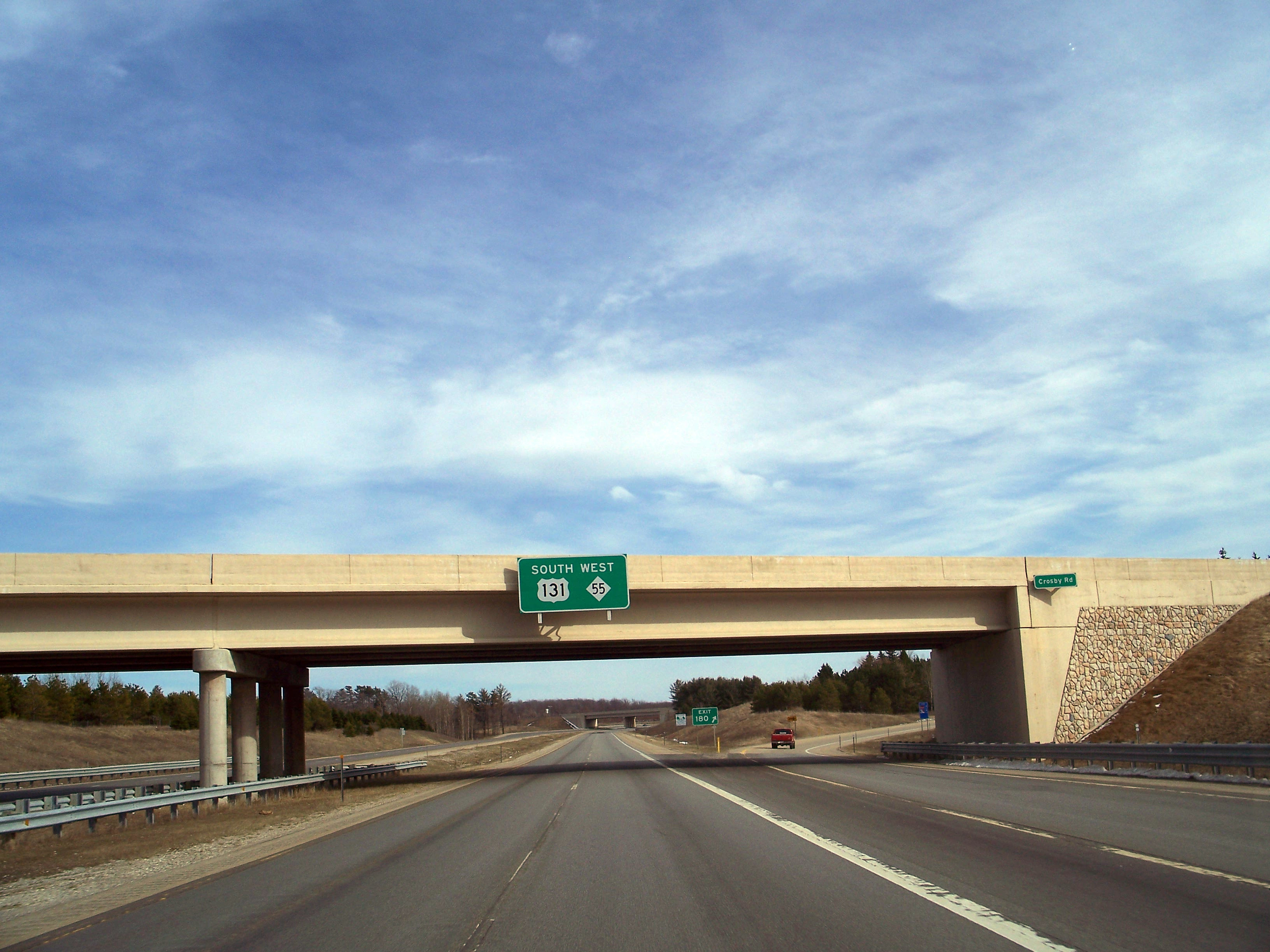
US 131 southbound passing under Crosby Road as M-55 joins it on the Cadillac bypass

M-55 had its beginning by July 1, 1919 when it was designated from Cadillac to Merritt. In 1926, M-55 was extended eastward to Houghton Lake over a section of the former M-14 that was not used for the then-new US 27. At the same time, another segment of the highway was designated between M-76 at West Branch and US 23 at Whittemore. The next year, M-55 was routed along sections of US 27 and M-76 between the two communities. A western extension was added from Cadillac to US 31 near Manistee in 1932 while the eastern end was shifted from Whittemore to Tawas City when US 23 was rerouted through the area.

Segments of M-55 have been relocated in the years since the basic routing was completed in the early 1930s. A more direct route from West Branch eastward was created in 1938. Prior to the construction of present-day Hemlock Road through Tawas City, M-55 entered Tawas City via present-day Plank Road, Second Street, Fifth Avenue, and Mathews Street, ending at the present-day intersection of US 23 and Mathews Street. In 1949, US 27 was moved to run to the west of Houghton and Higgins lakes. M-55 was shifted to run concurrently southward along the former M-169 which was replaced by US 27. At the intersection with the former US 27, M-55 was routed east, and the former route of M-55 was designated as a new M-169. In 1950, this M-169 was redesignated Business M-55 (Bus. M-55). M-55 was rerouted off US 27 when the US 27 freeway was completed in the area. In rerouting M-55, it was shifted back to its former routing through Houghton Lake Heights, replacing Bus. M-55 in late 1961.

The last gravel segments were paved in Iosco County between late 1958 and early 1960. Another segment east of Cadillac to M-66 south of Lake City was realigned in 1973. At the same time, M-55 was co-signed with a portion of the newly opened stretch of I-75 between M-157 and West Branch. The last routing change was made in November 2000 when the southern segment of the Cadillac bypass was opened. M-55 was moved out of downtown Cadillac and along the freeway and M-115. US 131 joined M-55 on the bypass the next October when the northern half of the bypass was completed in 2001.

== Major intersections ==
County	Location	mi	km	Exit	Destinations	Notes
Manistee	Manistee Township	0.000	0.000		US 31 / LMCT – Traverse City, Manistee	Western terminus of M-55
Wexford	South Branch Township	25.803	41.526		M-37 – Traverse City, Grand Rapids	
Wexford	Cadillac	43.814	70.512		M-115 west – Frankfort	Western end of M-115 concurrency
Wexford	Cadillac	44.276	71.255		Sunnyside Drive	Former routing of M-55
Wexford	Clam Lake Township	46.773	75.274	176	US 131 south – Grand Rapids M-115 east – Clare	Eastern end of M-115 concurrency; M-55 joins US 131 concurrency, exit numbers correspond to US 131 mileage
Wexford	Clam Lake Township	48.039	77.311	177	Bus. US 131 north – Cadillac	
Wexford	Clam Lake–Haring township line	50.898	81.912	180	US 131 north – Petoskey	Northern end of US 131 concurrency
Missaukee	Lake–Reeder township line	58.732	94.520		M-66 south – McBain	Western end of M-66 concurrency
Missaukee	Lake City	63.796	102.670		M-66 north – Kalkaska	Eastern end of M-66 concurrency
Roscommon	Lake–Roscommon township line	84.004– 84.022	135.191– 135.220		US 127 – Clare, Grayling	Exit 194 on US 127
Roscommon	Denton Township	92.851	149.429		M-18 south – Gladwin	Western end of M-18 concurrency
Roscommon	Denton Township	93.644	150.705		M-18 north – Roscommon	Eastern end of M-18 concurrency
Roscommon	Backus Township	95.021	152.921		M-157 north – Roscommon	Southern terminus of M-157
Roscommon	Backus Township	99.937	160.833		Old 55 (West Branch Road) to F-97	Former routing of M-55
Roscommon	Backus Township	100.773	162.178	227	I-75 north – Grayling, Mackinac Bridge	Western end of I-75 concurrency; exit numbers follow I-75 numbering
Roscommon	Richfield Township	105.318	169.493	222	Old 76 – St. Helen	Former M-76
Ogemaw	Ogemaw Township	112.374	180.848	215	I-75 south – Saginaw BL I-75 south – West Branch	Eastern end of I-75 concurrency; western end of BL I-75 concurrency; northern terminus of BL I-75
Ogemaw	West Branch	114.197	183.782		M-30 south – Gladwin	Northern terminus of M-30
Ogemaw	West Branch	115.295	185.549		BL I-75 south	Eastern end of BL I-75 concurrency
Ogemaw	Churchill Township	120.197	193.438		M-33 – Cheboygan, Standish	
Iosco	Reno Township	136.183	219.165		M-65 – Hale, Whittemore	
Iosco	Tawas City	150.944	242.921		US 23 / LHCT – Standish, Alpena	Eastern terminus of M-55
1.000 mi = 1.609 km; 1.000 km = 0.621 mi: Concurrency terminus

== Business loop ==
Business M-55
- Location: Houghton Lake Heights
- Length: 2.898 mi (4.664 km)
- Existed: Early 1950–Late 1961

Business M-55 (Bus. M-55) was a business loop designated for just over a decade in Houghton Lake Heights. Bus. M-55 ran for 2.898 miles (4.664 km) along Houghton Lake Drive between US 27 and Federal Drive next to the Houghton Lake. M-55 was shifted off the road when several highways in the Houghton Lake area were rerouted. US 27 was moved to the west side of the lakes in the area, and M-55 was moved follow US 27, replace the original M-169 in the area and replace a section of the former routing of US 27 in Houghton Lake in 1949. By early 1950, the former route of M-55 through Houghton Lake Heights was designated Bus. M-55. This business loop existed until the US 27 freeway was built in the area in late 1961. At that time, M-55 was moved back to its pre-1949 routing, replacing Bus. M-55.
