= Richfield Township, Roscommon County, Michigan =

Richfield Township, Michigan
- Civil township
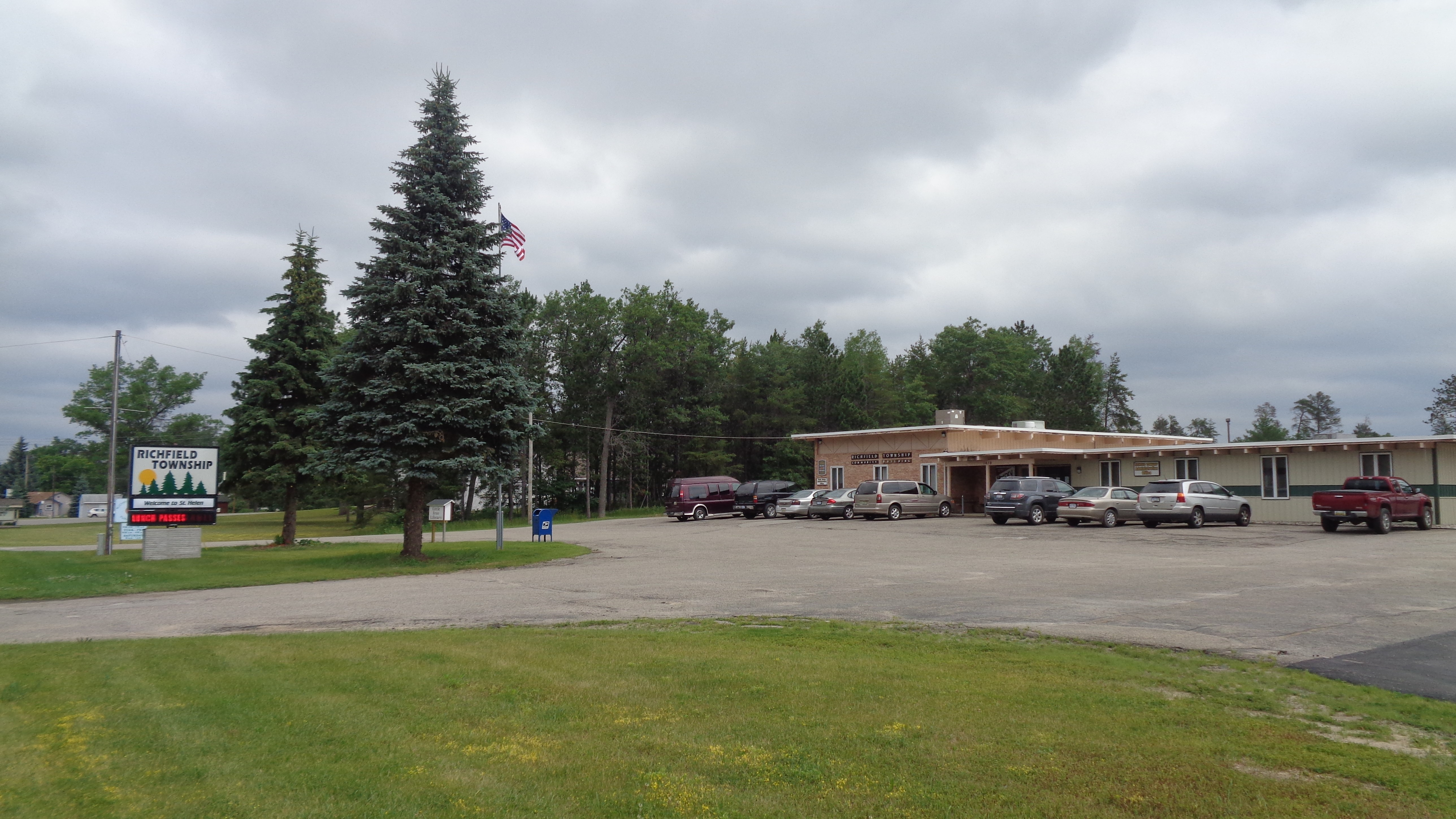
- Richfield Township Administration Office in the community of St. Helen

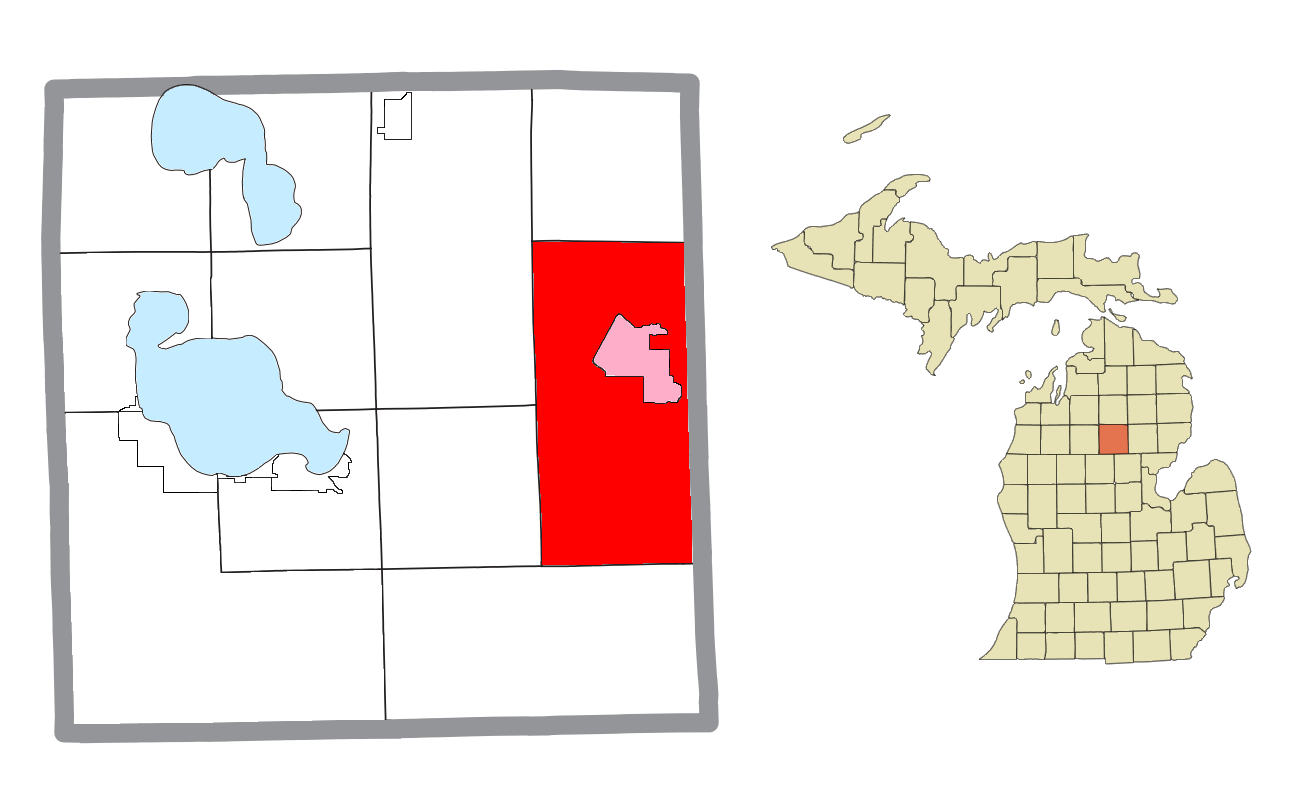
- Location within Roscommon County (red) and the administered community of St. Helen (pink)

- Location within the state of Michigan Richfield Township (the United States)
- Coordinates: 44°21′01″N 84°25′29″W
- Country: United States
- State: Michigan
- County: Roscommon

Government
  - Supervisor: John Bawol
  - Clerk: Greg Watt

Area
  - Total: 73.00 sq mi (189.1 km^{2})
  - Land: 68.98 sq mi (178.7 km^{2})
  - Water: 4.02 sq mi (10.4 km^{2})
- Elevation: 1,263 ft (385 m)

Population (2020)
  - Total: 3,545
  - Density: 51.4/sq mi (19.8/km^{2})
- Time zone: UTC-5 (Eastern (EST))
  - Summer (DST): UTC-4 (EDT)
- ZIP code(s): 48656 (St. Helen); 48661 (West Branch)
- Area code: 989
- FIPS code: 26-68200
- GNIS feature ID: 1626969
- Website: Official website

Richfield Township is a civil township of Roscommon County in the U.S. state of Michigan. The population was 3,545 at the 2020 census.

== Communities ==
- Artesia Beach is an unincorporated community located on the southwest shores of Lake St. Helen on the township line with Higgins Township at 44°21′23″N 84°29′30″W.
- Au Sable River Park is an unincorporated community located along the South Branch of the Au Sable River at 44°24′12″N 84°27′37″W.
- Geels is an unincorporated community located in the northwest corner of the township at 44°25′19″N 84°29′01″W. Geels was founded along the Michigan Central Railroad as a midway point between Roscommon and St. Helen. A post office opened on May 18, 1914 but is no longer in operation.
- Maple Valley is an unincorporated community located along the township line with Backus Township at 44°18′19″N 84°29′28″W. Maple Valley began as a settlement in 1907.
- St. Helen is an unincorporated community and census-designated place located within the township.

== Geography ==
According to the U.S. Census Bureau, the township has a total area of 73.00 square miles (189.07 km^{2}), of which 68.98 square miles (178.66 km^{2}) is land and 4.02 square miles (10.41 km^{2}) (5.51%) is water.

The majority of Lake St. Helen is located within Richfield Township. The Marsh Creek / Beaver Lake Flooding State Wildlife Management Area is also located within the township.

=== Major highways ===
- I-75 runs west–east through the central portion of the township.
- M-55 runs concurrent with Interstate 75 through the township.
- F-28 is a short county-designated highway within the township.
- F-97 runs through the township.
- M-76 is a former state highway that was commissioned from 1919–1973. It has various local names but may still carry the Old M-76 name.

== Demographics ==
As of the census of 2000, there were 4,139 people, 1,896 households, and 1,239 families residing in the township. The population density was 60.1 inhabitants per square mile (23.2/km^{2}). There were 3,760 housing units at an average density of 54.6 per square mile (21.1/km^{2}). The racial makeup of the township was 97.99% White, 0.07% African American, 0.89% Native American, 0.19% Asian, 0.05% Pacific Islander, 0.12% from other races, and 0.68% from two or more races. 0.82% of the population were Hispanic or Latino of any race.

There were 1,896 households, out of which 19.8% had children under the age of 18 living with them, 53.0% were married couples living together, 9.1% had a female householder with no husband present, and 34.6% were non-families. 30.1% of all households were made up of individuals, and 15.9% had someone living alone who was 65 years of age or older. The average household size was 2.18 and the average family size was 2.65.

In the township the population was spread out, with 19.3% under the age of 18, 4.3% from 18 to 24, 21.7% from 25 to 44, 28.9% from 45 to 64, and 25.7% who were 65 years of age or older. The median age was 49 years. For every 100 females, there were 97.3 males. For every 100 females age 18 and over, there were 93.1 males.

The median income for a household in the township was $26,806, and the median income for a family was $32,241. Males had a median income of $31,000 versus $21,113 for females. The per capita income for the township was $17,282. 15.9% of the population and 10.4% of families were below the poverty line. Out of the total population, 25.6% of those under the age of 18 and 7.7% of those 65 and older were living below the poverty line.
