= Backus Township, Michigan =

- Civil township
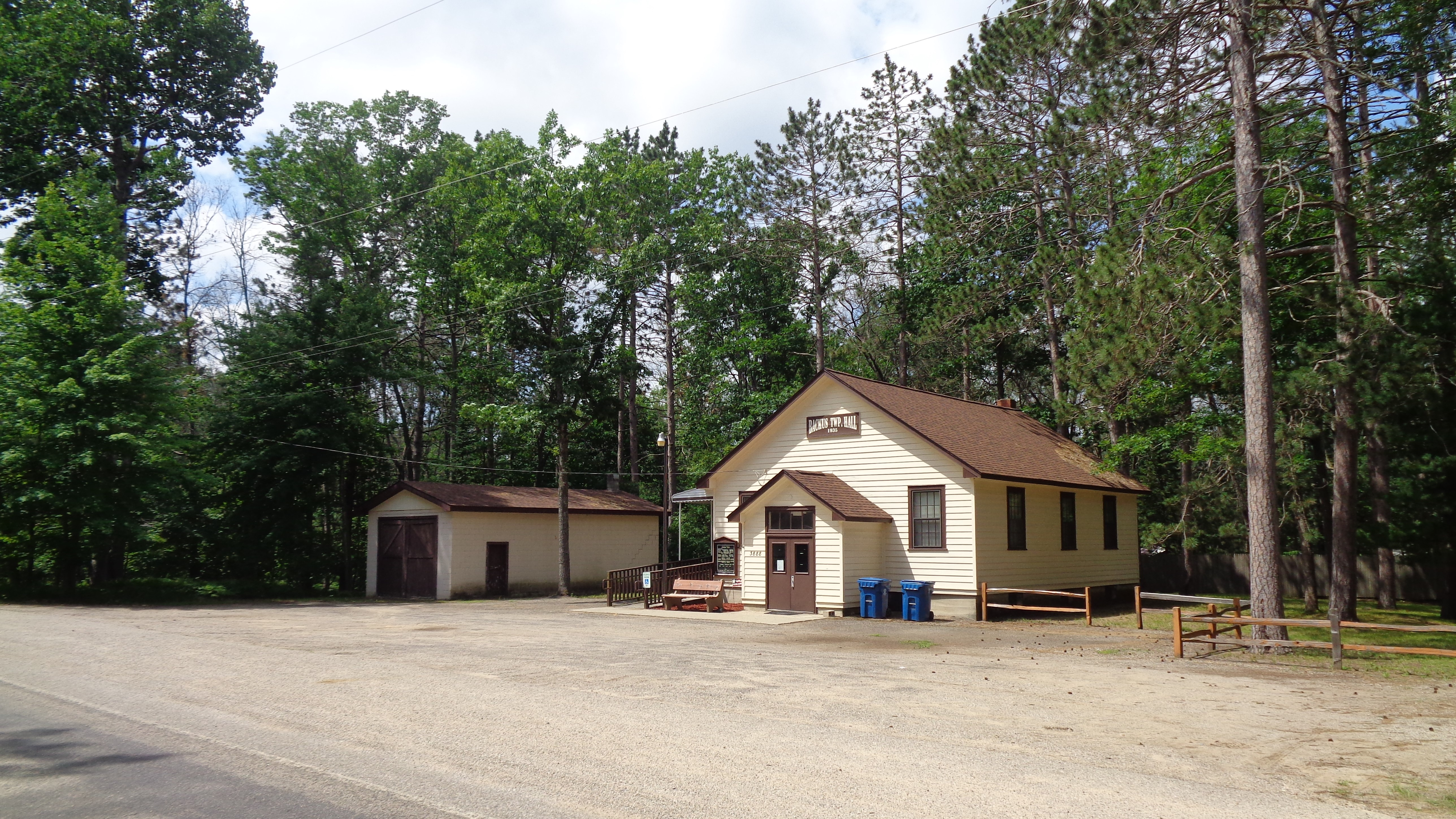
- Backus Township Hall

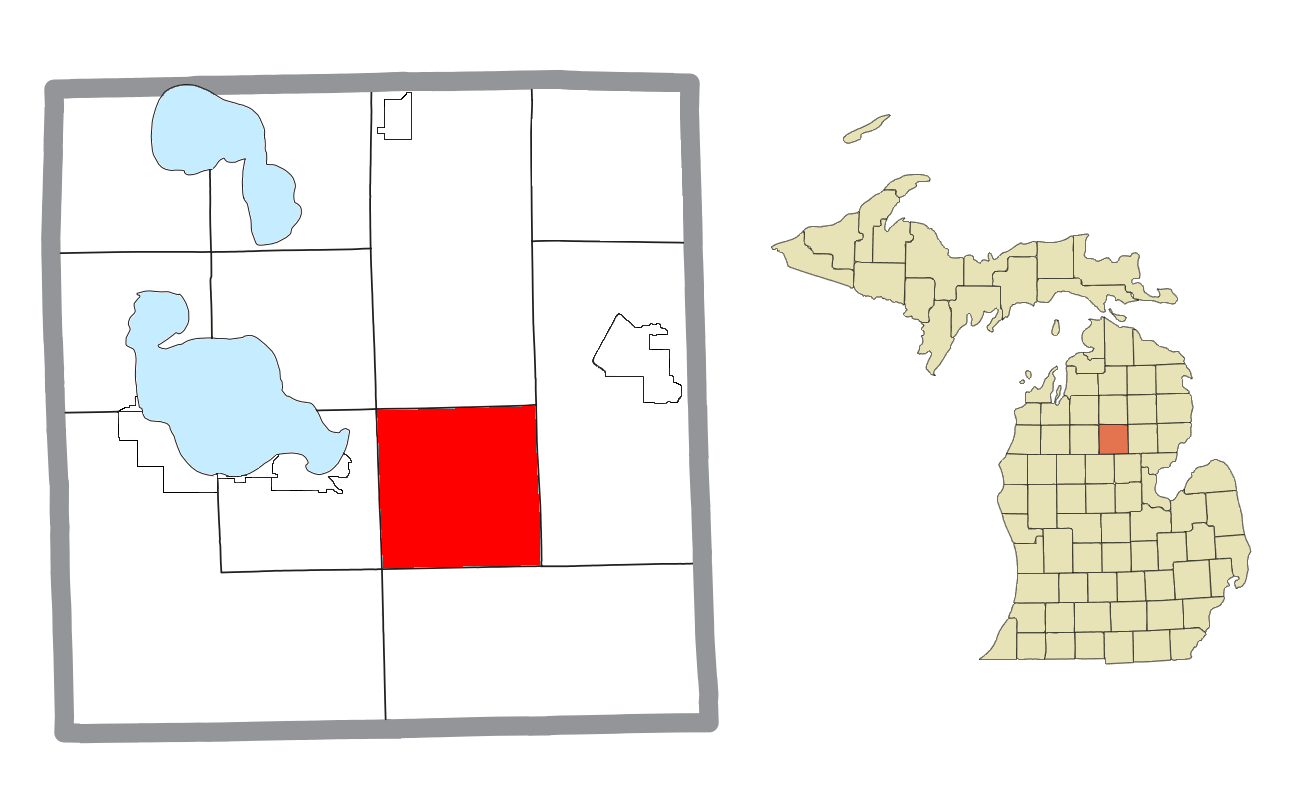
- Location within Roscommon County

- Location within the state of Michigan Backus Township (the United States)
- Coordinates: 44°17′30″N 84°34′15″W
- Country: United States
- State: Michigan
- County: Roscommon

Government
  - Supervisor: Michael Orzechowski
  - Clerk: Louise Nagy

Area
  - Total: 35.99 sq mi (93.2 km^{2})
  - Land: 34.36 sq mi (89.0 km^{2})
  - Water: 1.63 sq mi (4.2 km^{2})
- Elevation: 1,168 ft (356 m)

Population (2020)
  - Total: 294
  - Density: 8.56/sq mi (3.31/km^{2})
- Time zone: UTC-5 (Eastern (EST))
  - Summer (DST): UTC-4 (EDT)
- ZIP code(s): 48651 (Prudenville); 48656 (St. Helen)
- Area code: 989
- FIPS code: 26-04720
- GNIS feature ID: 1625871
- Website: Official website

Backus Township is a civil township of Roscommon County in the U.S. state of Michigan. The population was 294 at the 2020 census.

== Communities ==
- Kirkland is a former community that was named after Denton Township supervisor Frank Kirkland, and a post office with that name existed from September 27, 1907 until September 29, 1934. Although named after the Denton Township supervisor, the community appears in Backus Township on a 1916 and 1930 map of Roscommon County.
- Maple Valley is an unincorporated community located along the township line with Richfield Township at 44°18′19″N 84°29′28″W.

== Geography ==
According to the U.S. Census Bureau, the township has a total area of 35.99 square miles (93.21 km^{2}), of which 34.36 square miles (88.99 km^{2}) is land and 1.63 square miles (4.22 km^{2}) (4.40%) is water.

The southern portion of Backus Creek State Game Area is located within Backus Township.

== Demographics ==
As of the census of 2000, there were 350 people, 142 households, and 100 families residing in the township. The population density was 10.2 inhabitants per square mile (3.9/km^{2}). There were 284 housing units at an average density of 8.3 per square mile (3.2/km^{2}). The racial makeup of the township was 98.57% White, 0.86% Native American, and 0.57% from two or more races. Hispanic or Latino of any race were 1.43% of the population.

There were 142 households, out of which 27.5% had children under the age of 18 living with them, 66.2% were married couples living together, 2.8% had a female householder with no husband present, and 28.9% were non-families. 21.8% of all households were made up of individuals, and 9.9% had someone living alone who was 65 years of age or older. The average household size was 2.46 and the average family size was 2.93.

In the township the population was spread out, with 24.6% under the age of 18, 4.6% from 18 to 24, 25.4% from 25 to 44, 28.3% from 45 to 64, and 17.1% who were 65 years of age or older. The median age was 41 years. For every 100 females, there were 97.7 males. For every 100 females age 18 and over, there were 97.0 males.

The median income for a household in the township was $32,222, and the median income for a family was $38,750. Males had a median income of $35,833 versus $20,625 for females. The per capita income for the township was $15,836. About 11.9% of families and 17.5% of the population were below the poverty line, including 22.0% of those under age 18 and 11.1% of those age 65 or over.

== Highways ==
- I-75 runs through the northeast corner of the township.
- M-18 forms a brief boundary in the northwest corner.
- M-55 runs east–west through the north portion.
- M-157 is one of the shortest highways in the state and connects M-18 and M-55.
