= Higgins Township, Michigan =

- Civil township
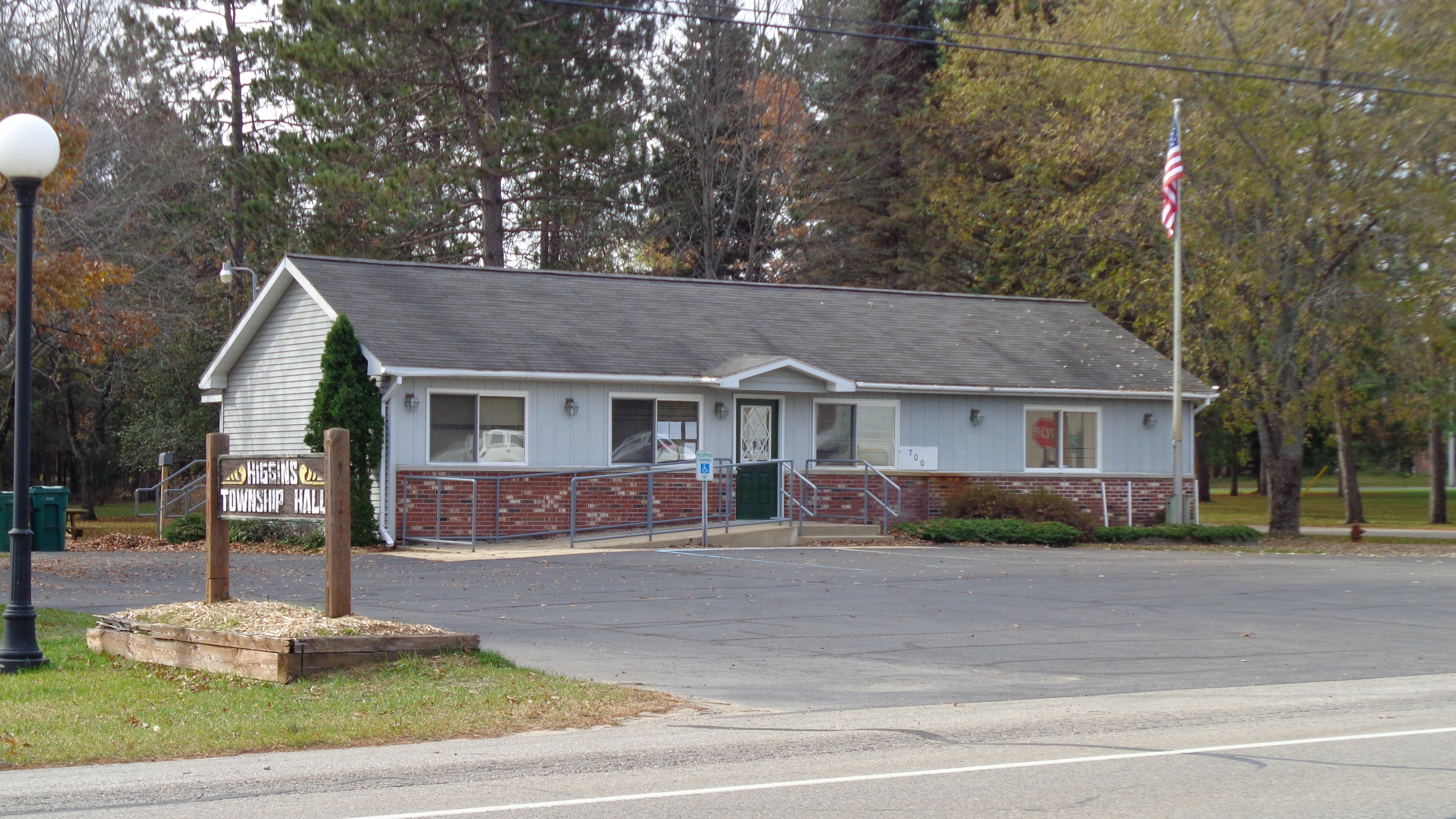
- Higgins Township Hall in Roscommon

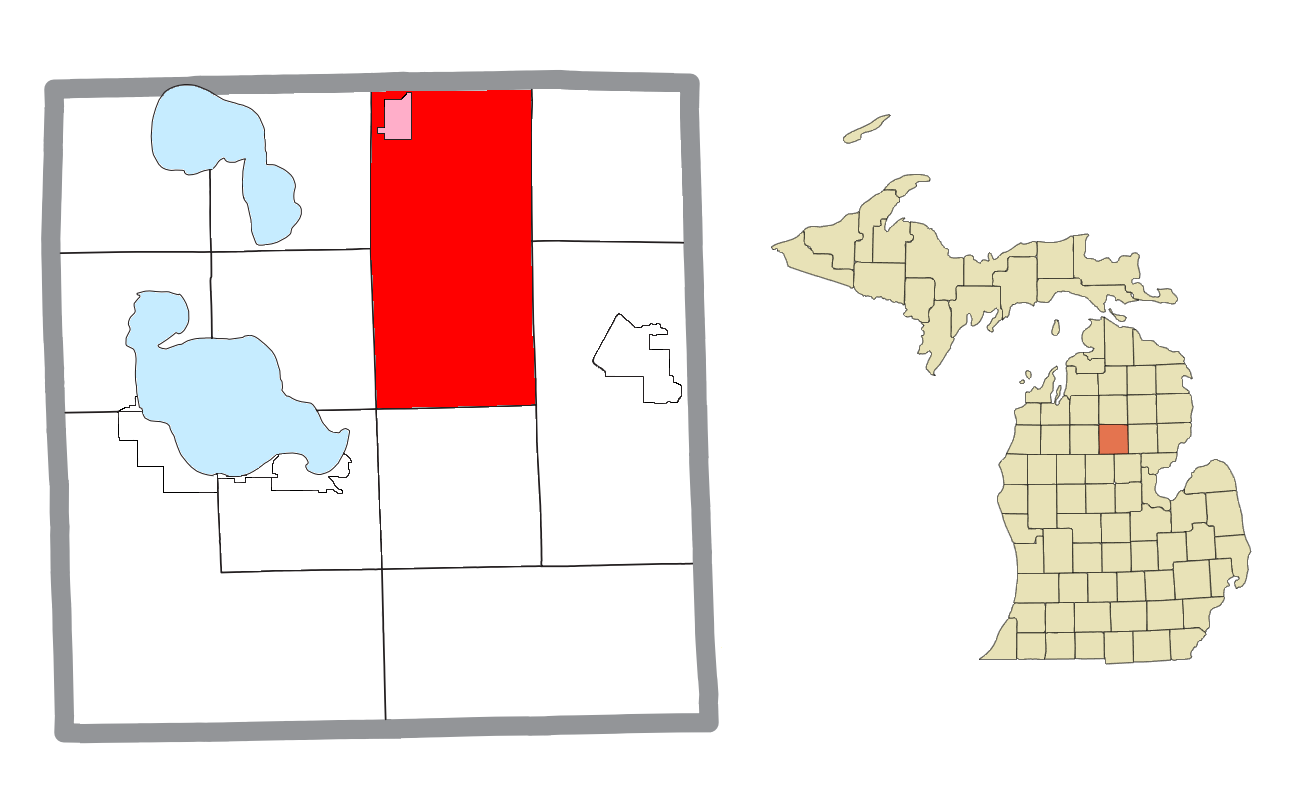
- Location within Roscommon County (red) and the administered village of Roscommon (pink)

- Location within the state of Michigan Higgins Township (the United States)
- Coordinates: 44°27′30″N 84°34′52″W
- Country: United States
- State: Michigan
- County: Roscommon

Government
  - Supervisor: William Curnalia
  - Clerk: LeAnna Goodrich

Area
  - Total: 73.30 sq mi (189.8 km^{2})
  - Land: 70.36 sq mi (182.2 km^{2})
  - Water: 2.94 sq mi (7.6 km^{2})
- Elevation: 1,243 ft (379 m)

Population (2020)
  - Total: 1,864
  - Density: 26.5/sq mi (10.2/km^{2})
- Time zone: UTC-5 (Eastern (EST))
  - Summer (DST): UTC-4 (EDT)
- ZIP code(s): 48653 (Roscommon); 48656 (St. Helen)
- Area code: 989
- FIPS code: 26-38020
- GNIS feature ID: 1626468
- Website: Official website

Higgins Township is a civil township of Roscommon County in the U.S. state of Michigan. The population was 1,864 at the 2020 census. The village of Roscommon is located within the township.

== Communities ==
- Artesia Beach is an unincorporated community located at 44°21′23″N 84°29′30″W. The community is located along the southwestern shores of Lake St. Helen and extends into Richfield Township.
- Moore is a former settlement along the Mackinac division of the Michigan Central Railroad that began in 1890 about 8.0 miles (12.9 km) northwest of St. Helen.
- Roscommon is a village and county seat located in the northwestern portion of the township. It is the county's only incorporated municipality.

== Geography ==
According to the U.S. Census Bureau, the township has a total area of 73.30 square miles (189.8 km^{2}), of which 70.36 square miles (182.2 km^{2}) is land and 2.94 square miles (7.6 km^{2}) (4.01%) is water.

The northern portion of Backus Creek State Game Area is located within Higgins Township.

== Demographics ==
As of the census of 2000, there were 2,061 people, 816 households, and 509 families residing in the township. The population density was 29.2 inhabitants per square mile (11.3/km^{2}). There were 1,175 housing units at an average density of 16.7 per square mile (6.4/km^{2}). The racial makeup of the township was 96.80% White, 0.68% African American, 0.58% Native American, 0.44% Asian, 0.05% from other races, and 1.46% from two or more races. Hispanic or Latino of any race were 0.44% of the population.

There were 816 households, out of which 28.9% had children under the age of 18 living with them, 47.1% were married couples living together, 11.6% had a female householder with no husband present, and 37.6% were non-families. 32.6% of all households were made up of individuals, and 14.8% had someone living alone who was 65 years of age or older. The average household size was 2.31 and the average family size was 2.94.

In the township the population was spread out, with 23.0% under the age of 18, 8.3% from 18 to 24, 24.3% from 25 to 44, 23.3% from 45 to 64, and 21.1% who were 65 years of age or older. The median age was 41 years. For every 100 females, there were 96.3 males. For every 100 females age 18 and over, there were 90.6 males.

The median income for a household in the township was $29,801, and the median income for a family was $36,033. Males had a median income of $29,732 versus $20,673 for females. The per capita income for the township was $15,529. About 14.3% of families and 17.8% of the population were below the poverty line, including 27.5% of those under age 18 and 7.4% of those age 65 or over.
