= Roscommon Conservation Airport =

Public use airport in Roscommon County, Michigan

- IATA: none; ICAO: none; FAA LID: 3RC

Summary
- Owner/Operator: Michigan Department of Natural Resources
- Serves: Roscommon, Michigan
- Location: Roscommon County, Michigan
- Time zone: UTC−05:00 (-5)
  - Summer (DST): UTC−04:00 (-4)
- Elevation AMSL: 1,157 ft / 353 m
- Coordinates: 44°28′24″N 084°33′46″W
- Interactive map of Roscommon Conservation Airport

Runways
Direction	Length		Surface
Direction	ft	m	Surface
10/28	3,552	1,083	Asphalt
18/36	2,500	762	Turf

Statistics (2018)
- Aircraft movements: 504

The Roscommon Conservation Airport (FAA LID: 3RC) is a publicly owned, public use airport located 2 miles southeast of Roscommon in Roscommon County, Michigan, United States. It is located on 100 acres at an elevation of 1157 feet.

The airport is owned by the Michigan Department of Natural Resources and is largely used to support the agency's operations in the area. The agency focuses particularly on forest preservation in Roscommon County, including managing and combating forest fires.

As it is open to the public, the airport also sees significant traffic from golfers coming into the nearby Forest Dunes golf club. The club provides shuttle services to the airport to assist golfers flying to Roscommon Conservation Airport to visit the club.

== Facilities and aircraft ==
Roscommon Conservation Airport has two runways. Runway 10/28 measures 3552 x 75 ft (1083 x 23 m) and is paved with asphalt. Runway 18/36 measures 2500 x 100 ft (762 x 30 m) and is turf.

In 2020, work began at the airport to renovate runway 10/28. Though delayed due to the COVID-19 pandemic, work at the airport was completed in 2021. Work was done to adjust paving cross sections and grading; in particular, the width of the concrete supporting the runway was doubled.

For the 12-month period ending December 31, 2018, the airport averaged 504 aircraft operations per year, an average of 42 per month. This was all general aviation. For the same time period, three aircraft were based at the airport, all airplanes: two single-engine and one multi-engine.

There is no fixed-base operator at the airport, and no fuel is available.

== Accidents and incidents ==
- On May 20, 2001, a Cessna 152 collided with trees after an aborted takeoff from Roscommon Conservation Airport. The pilot reported that the takeoff roll was longer than expected, likely due to heavy loading, the rough runway surface, and a relatively high density altitude. The aircraft lifted off on time, but during climbout, the pilot "sensed a lack of acceleration and climb performance," so he lowered the nose to gain airspeed. The pilot subsequently pitched for based angle of climb airspeed, but the aircraft still would not climb, and it became evident that it would not clear the trees ahead. The pilot therefore decided to settle back to the airport and risk damaging the aircraft instead of likely serious bodily harm. The probable cause of the accident was found to be the pilot's failure to maintain clearance from the trees, with factors including a tailwind, high weight and density altitude, the rough runway, and the pilot's failure to calculate takeoff performance.

== See also ==
- List of airports in Michigan
