= Lake St. Helen =

Lake in Michigan, United States

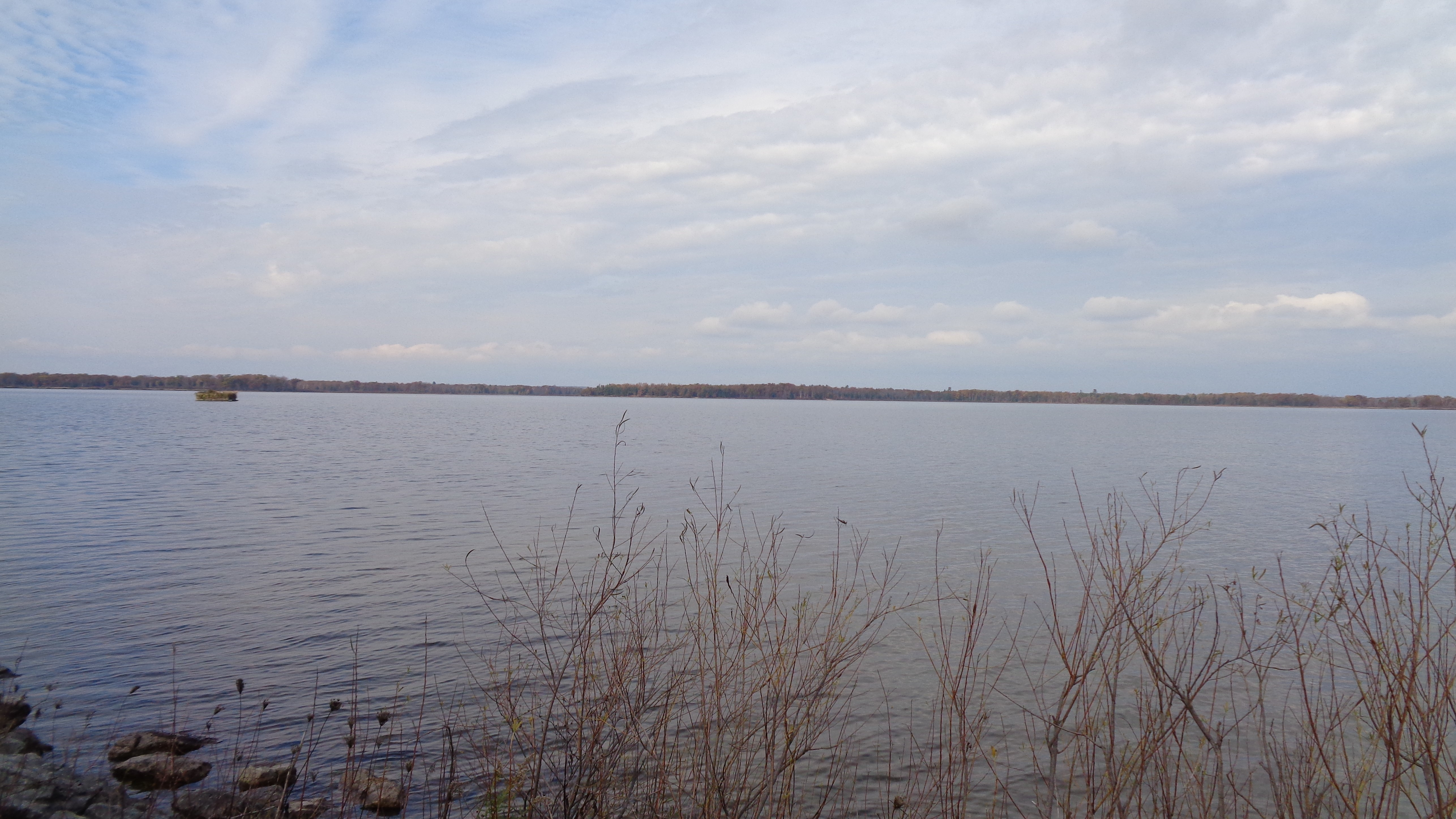
- View from the community of St. Helen

- Location within the state of Michigan
- Location: Roscommon County, Michigan
- Coordinates: 44°21′51″N 84°27′48″W
- Basin countries: United States
- Surface area: 2,400 acres (9.7 km^{2})
- Surface elevation: 1,155 ft (352 m)

Lake St. Helen is a 2,400-acre (9.7 km^{2}) public lake located in Roscommon County in the U.S. state of Michigan, and borders on the community of St. Helen, Michigan. It is the headwaters for the south branch of the Au Sable River. From 1998 to 2003, the Lake was subject to a water weed (millfoil) eradication project, involving weevil restocking, which was successful at the time. Fishing is available throughout the lake, albeit different fish are found in different places, and includes: Largemouth bass, bluegill, crappie, perch, pike, and walleye. A Bluegill Festival is held each summer.

The lake is located at 44°21′51″N 84°27′48″W and the elevation is 1,155 feet (352 m).

== See also ==
- List of lakes in Michigan
