= St. Helen, Michigan =

- Census-designated place (CDP) & unincorporated community
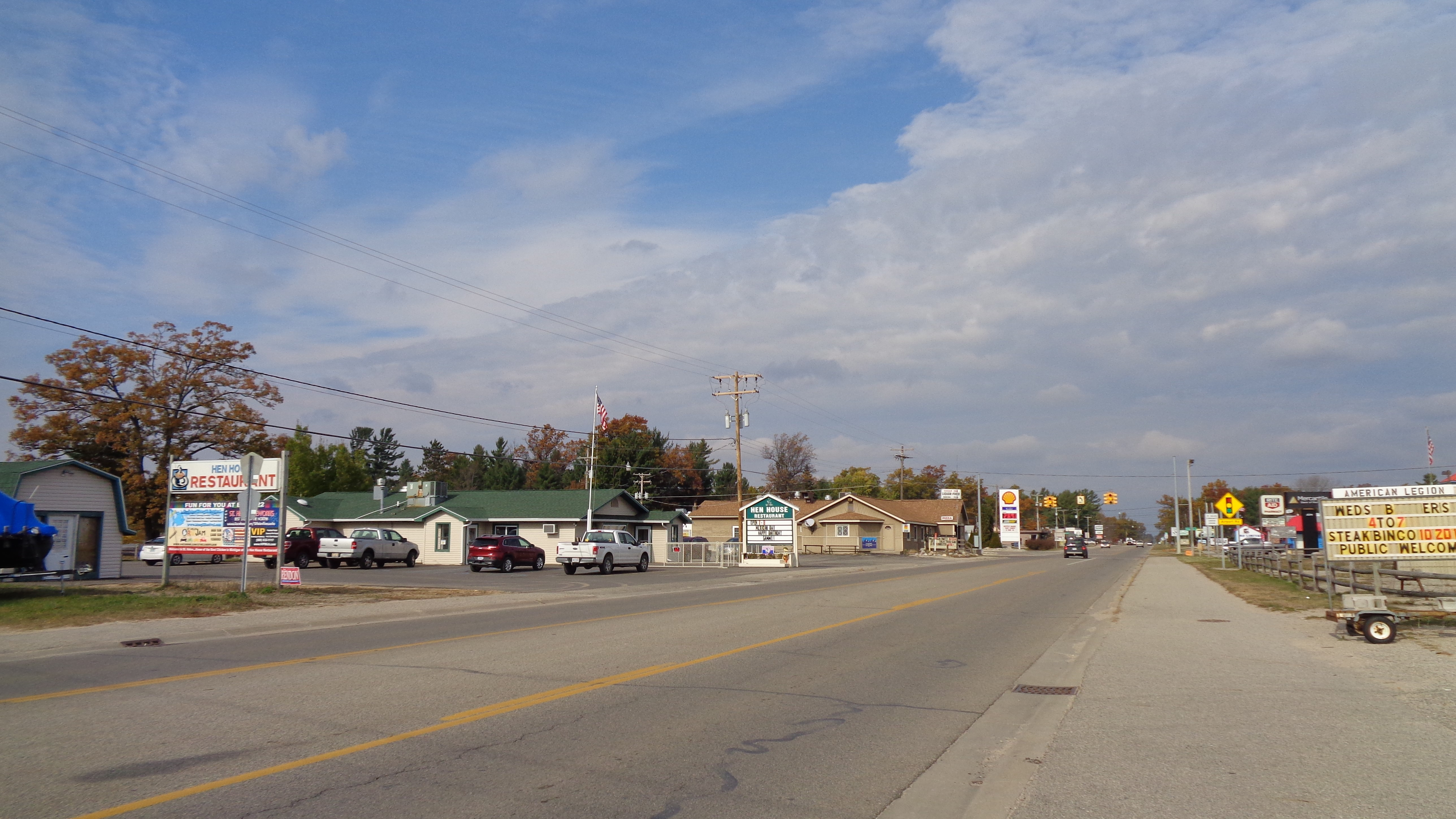
- Looking north along North St. Helen Road

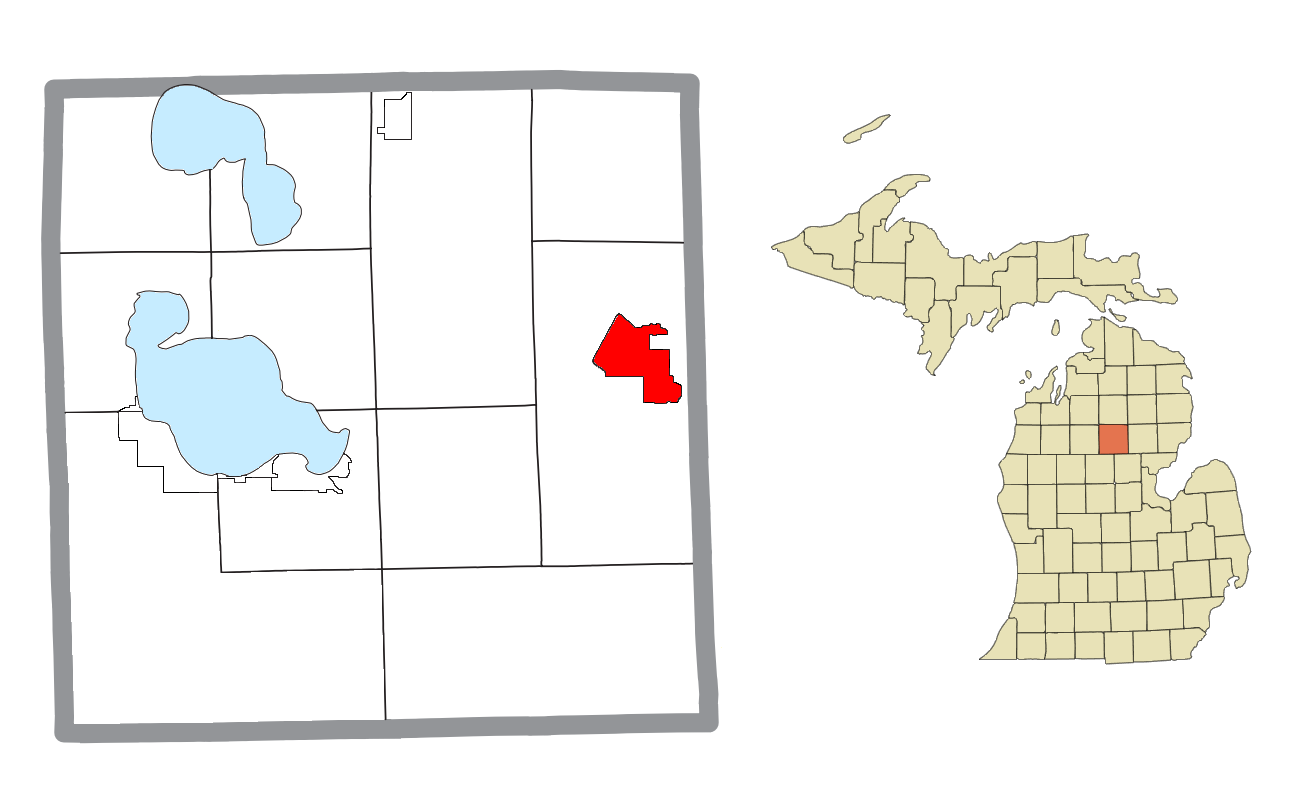
- Location within Roscommon County

- Location within the state of Michigan St. Helen (the United States)
- Coordinates: 44°21′49″N 84°24′37″W
- Country: United States
- State: Michigan
- County: Roscommon
- Township: Richfield

Area
  - Total: 6.62 sq mi (17.15 km^{2})
  - Land: 5.73 sq mi (14.84 km^{2})
  - Water: 0.89 sq mi (2.31 km^{2})
- Elevation: 1,191 ft (363 m)

Population (2020)
  - Total: 2,735
  - Density: 477.31/sq mi (184.29/km^{2})
- Time zone: UTC-5 (Eastern (EST))
  - Summer (DST): UTC-4 (EDT)
- ZIP code(s): 48656
- Area code: 989
- FIPS code: 26-70800
- GNIS feature ID: 0636665

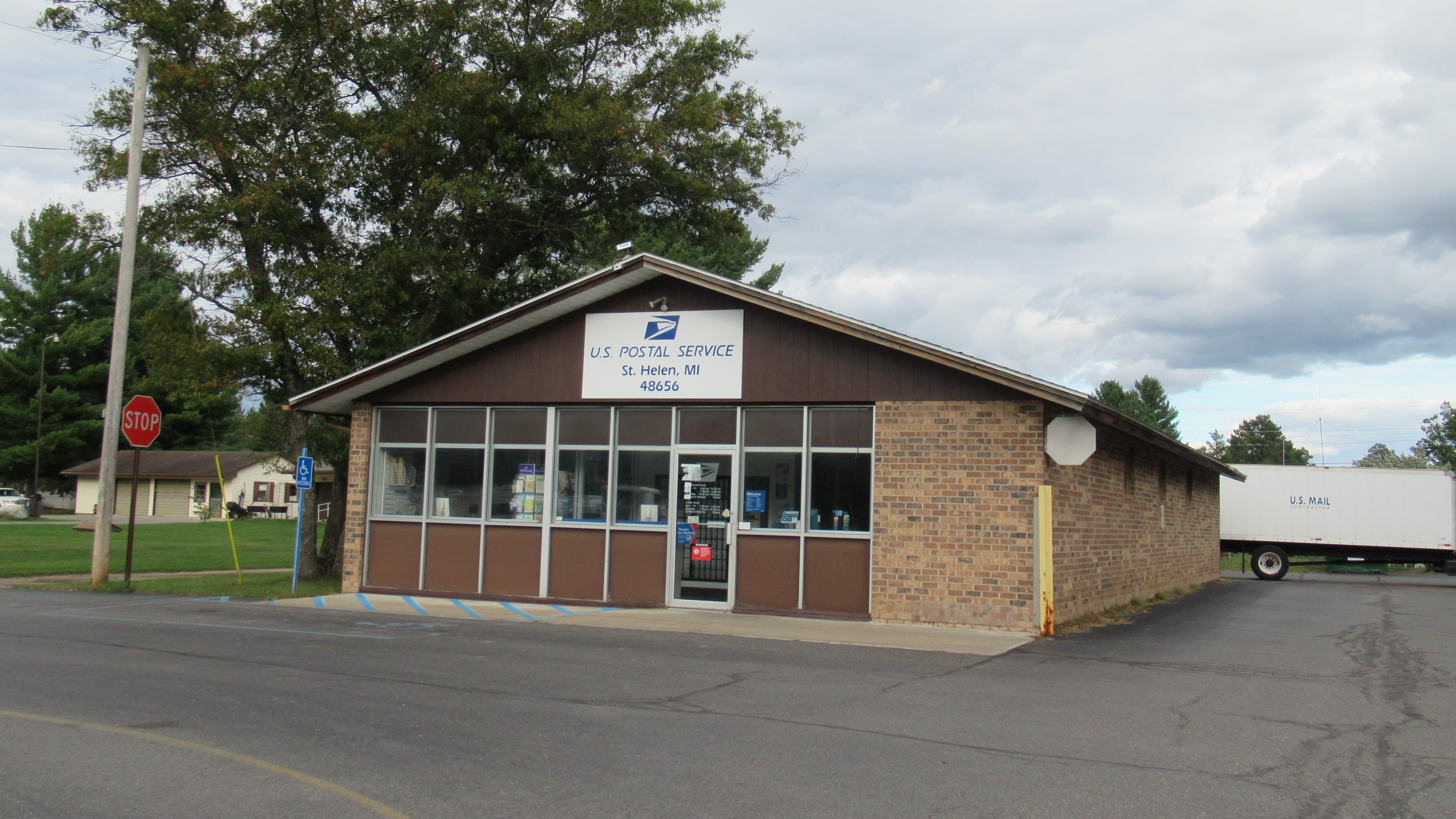
U.S. Post Office in St. Helen

St. Helen is an unincorporated community and census-designated place (CDP) in Roscommon County in the U.S. state of Michigan. The population was 2,735 at the 2020 census. St. Helen is located within Richfield Township.

== History ==
In the 1870s, lumber baron Henry Stephens established a large lumber operation at St. Helen, considered at the time to be among the largest and best equipped in the state. The mills were estimated to have produced more than 1 billion board feet (2,400,000 m^{3}) of lumber within a period of fourteen years. Most of the logs were moved by river, but lumber was also moved by rail.

The St. Helen Development Company was organized to sell land and promote development of the area, and over seven years sold 80,000 acres (320 km^{2}) of land and helped to build more than 30 miles (48 km) of roads and over 80 miles (130 km) of fencing.

St. Helen was named after the lake. It is believed that French voyageurs named it after Saint Helena of Constantinople, mother of Emperor Constantine.

The Detroit, Bay City and Alpena Railroad (later the Michigan Central, then the Detroit and Mackinac Railway and presently the Lake State Railway Company) built a line through the area with a station at St. Helen. M-76 passes through St. Helen and portions are still signed as "Old 76".

== Geography ==
According to the U.S. Census Bureau, the CDP has a total area of 6.62 square miles (17.15 km^{2}), of which 5.73 square miles (14.84 km^{2}) is land and 0.89 square miles (2.31 km^{2}) (13.44%) is water.

== Demographics ==
Historical population
Census	Pop.	Note	%±
1990	2,390		—
2000	2,993		25.2%
2010	2,668		−10.9%
2020	2,735		2.5%
U.S. Decennial Census

=== 2020 census ===
As of the 2020 census, St. Helen had a population of 2,735. The median age was 54.1 years. 14.2% of residents were under the age of 18 and 27.6% of residents were 65 years of age or older. For every 100 females there were 108.3 males, and for every 100 females age 18 and over there were 108.5 males age 18 and over.

92.2% of residents lived in urban areas, while 7.8% lived in rural areas.

There were 1,380 households in St. Helen, of which 15.6% had children under the age of 18 living in them. Of all households, 33.9% were married-couple households, 27.2% were households with a male householder and no spouse or partner present, and 28.5% were households with a female householder and no spouse or partner present. About 40.6% of all households were made up of individuals and 21.3% had someone living alone who was 65 years of age or older.

There were 2,567 housing units, of which 46.2% were vacant. The homeowner vacancy rate was 4.3% and the rental vacancy rate was 2.3%.

Racial composition as of the 2020 census
Race	Number	Percent
White	2,532	92.6%
Black or African American	6	0.2%
American Indian and Alaska Native	17	0.6%
Asian	1	0.0%
Native Hawaiian and Other Pacific Islander	0	0.0%
Some other race	26	1.0%
Two or more races	153	5.6%
Hispanic or Latino (of any race)	61	2.2%

=== 2000 census ===
As of the census of 2000, there were 2,993 people, 1,380 households, and 873 families residing in the community. The population density was 229.3/km^{2} (593.6/mi^{2}). There were 2,617 housing units at an average density of 200.5/km^{2} (519.1/mi^{2}). The racial makeup of the community was 98.46% White, 0.07% African American, 0.63% Native American, 0.10% Asian, 0.03% Pacific Islander, 0.07% from other races, and 0.63% from two or more races. 0.77% of the population were Hispanic or Latino of any race.

There were 1,380 households, out of which 20.7% had children under the age of 18 living with them, 49.3% were married couples living together, 10.4% had a female householder with no husband present, and 36.7% were non-families. 32.3% of all households were made up of individuals, and 17.0% had someone living alone who was 65 years of age or older. The average household size was 2.17 and the average family size was 2.67.

In the community the population was spread out, with 20.3% under the age of 18, 4.3% from 18 to 24, 22.9% from 25 to 44, 27.2% from 45 to 64, and 25.3% who were 65 years of age or older. The median age was 48 years. For every 100 females there were 94.6 males. For every 100 females age 18 and over, there were 88.8 males.

The median income for a household in the community was $24,104, and the median income for a family was $30,268. Males had a median income of $30,521 versus $20,461 for females. The per capita income for the community was $17,198. 19.5% of the population and 12.8% of families were below the poverty line. Out of the total people living in poverty, 32.6% were under the age of 18 and 9.1% were 65 or older.

== Notable people ==
- Charlton Heston spent part of his childhood in St. Helen. The Charlton Heston Academy in St. Helen is named after him.
