= Higgins Lake (disambiguation) =

Higgins Lake may refer to several lakes and at least one community.

- Higgins Lake (Ontario), a lake in Ontario.
- Higgins Lake, Michigan, an unincorporated community
- Higgins Lake, a lake in Roscommon County, Michigan
- Higgins Lake (North Carolina), a lake in Guilford County, North Carolina
- Higgins Lake (Minnesota), a lake in Anoka County, Minnesota
- Higgins Lake (California), a lake in Inyo County, California
- Higgins Lake (Colorado), a lake in Adams County, Colorado
- Higgins Lake (Alabama), a lake in Randolph County, Alabama

== See also ==
- O'Higgins Lake, or San Martín Lake, on the border of Chile and Argentina
