= Higgins Lake, Michigan =

- Unincorporated community
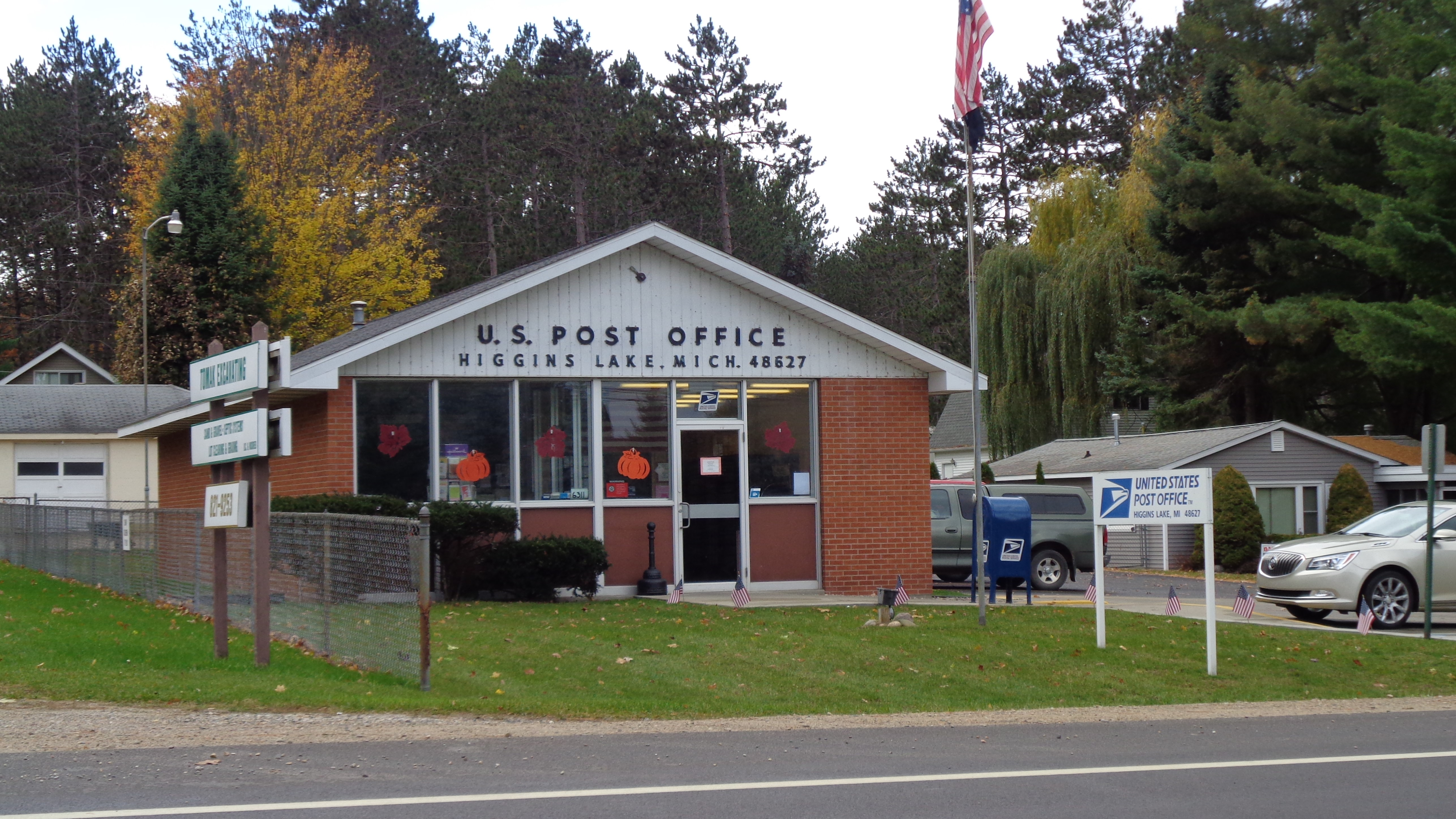
- Higgins Lake Post Office

- Location within the state of Michigan Location within the United States
- Coordinates: 44°29′01″N 84°46′47″W
- Country: United States
- State: Michigan
- County: Roscommon
- Township: Lyon
- Elevation: 1,171 ft (357 m)
- Time zone: UTC-5 (Eastern (EST))
  - Summer (DST): UTC-4 (EDT)
- ZIP code(s): 48627; 48653 (Roscommon)
- Area code: 989
- GNIS feature ID: 628220

Higgins Lake is an unincorporated community in Roscommon County in the U.S. state of Michigan. The community is located within Lyon Township. As an unincorporated community, Higgins Lake has no legally defined boundaries or population statistics of its own. Higgins Lake has its own post office with the 48627 ZIP Code.

== Geography ==
Higgins Lake is located along the western shores of Higgins Lake. The community is near U.S. Route 127 to the west, and Interstate 75 is to the east on the opposite side of the lake. Nearby parks include North Higgins Lake State Park to the north and South Higgins Lake State Park to the south.

The community is served by Roscommon Area Public Schools.

== History ==
The area received its first post office in 1902 under the name Higgins Lake, although it was a summer-only post office that only existed briefly from June 17 to August 30, 1902. A permanent Higgins Lake post office was opened under the same name on May 3, 1909. This post office was discontinued soon after on March 31, 1910 but reestablished under the name Lyon Manor on August 12, 1910. The name Lyon Manor was used until January 1, 1960 when the name was changed back to Higgins Lake. The post office remains in operation and is located at 6311 West Higgins Lake Drive.

The post office currently uses the 48627 ZIP Code and is primarily used for post office box services. The ZIP Code delivery serves a very small area encompassing the neighborhood immediately surrounding the post office. The majority of the Higgins Lake area is served separately by the Roscommon 48653 ZIP Code.

Higgins Lake's mean depth was 30.4 feet in a 2020 county survey. There is a dam that helps control the lake level on the southern portion of the lake. This dam flows outward at a rate of 44.2 cubic feet per second. This dam is managed by the Roscommon County Board of Commissioners. Land cover in the Higgins Lake watershed consists of 35.7% open water. The rest is 38.3% forest, 10.1% urban, 7.9% wetland, 5.3% grassland, 2.5% other, and 0.1% agricultural. Higgins Lake was formed around 12,000 years ago from glaciers shifting across Michigan. The glacier activity carved out bedrock and uncovered the natural springs that feed Higgins Lake. Some of these natural springs can be found coming out of the sand into the water on the East side of the North State Park. Higgins Lake gained its popularity in earlier times because it was a source of water near an area where lots of logging was done.
