= Lyon Township, Michigan =

Lyon Township is the name of some places in the U.S. state of Michigan:

- Lyon Township, Oakland County, Michigan
- Lyon Township, Roscommon County, Michigan

== See also ==
- Lyons Township, Ionia County, Michigan
