= Marl Lake =

Lake in Michigan, United States

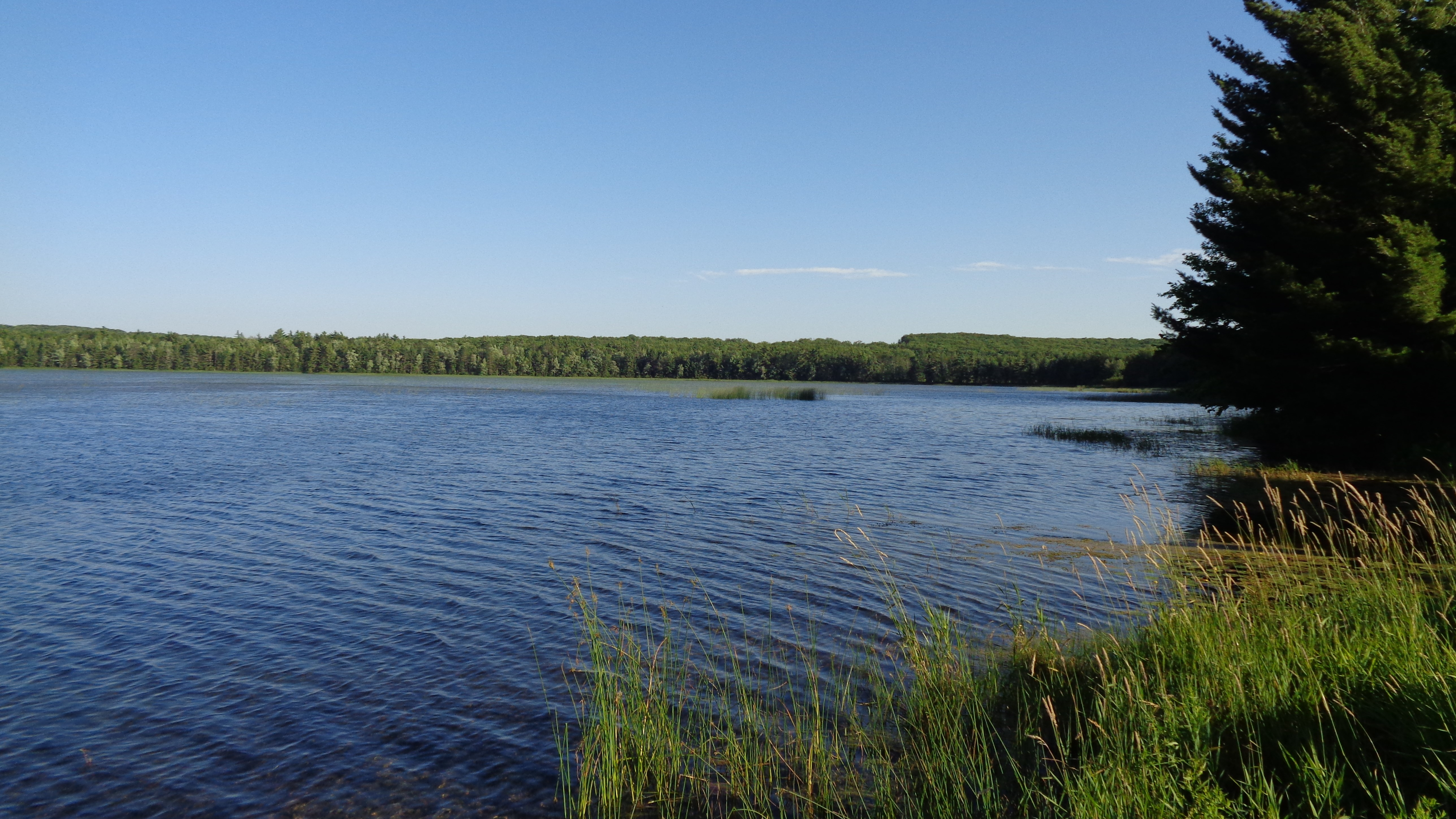
- View from the boating access point

- Location within the state of Michigan
- Location: Roscommon County, Michigan
- Coordinates: 44°25′21″N 84°40′13″W
- Type: Fresh water
- Primary inflows: Cut River from Higgins Lake
- Primary outflows: Cut River to Houghton Lake
- Basin countries: United States
- Surface area: 237 acres (95.9 ha)
- Max. depth: around 4 feet (1.2 m)
- Shore length^{1}: 2.43 miles (3.91 km)
- Surface elevation: 1,152 feet (351 m)
- Islands: none
- Settlements: Markey Township; Gerrish Township
- ^{1} Shore length is not a well-defined measure.

Marl Lake is a freshwater lake located in Roscommon County in the U.S. state of Michigan. The lake is entirety located within South Higgins Lake State Park. The lake is within Markey Township to the south and Gerrish Township to the north. Covering a surface area of 237 acres (0.96 km^{2}), Marl Lake is a significantly smaller and less-developed lake compared to the nearby Higgins Lake. The two are connected by the Cut River, and upon exiting Marl Lake, the Cut River continues to flow into Houghton Lake.

The lake can be reached through a state park access point along East Higgins Lake Road (County Road 100). The lake has a small public boat launch, but the use of electric or gas motors is restricted in favor of smaller vessels, as the lake itself is no more than 4 feet (1.2 m) deep. The waters may be difficult to fish due to its grassy nature and very loose marl bottom, but common fish within the lake include smallmouth bass, rock bass, sunfish, and several other small varieties. Other activities include hiking, biking, and cross-country skiing along the 5.5 miles (8.9 km) of trails cutting along and through the forest around Marl Lake. Kayaking, bird watching, photography, shore fishing, and picnicking are also popular activities.
