= South Higgins Lake State Park =

State park in Michigan, United States

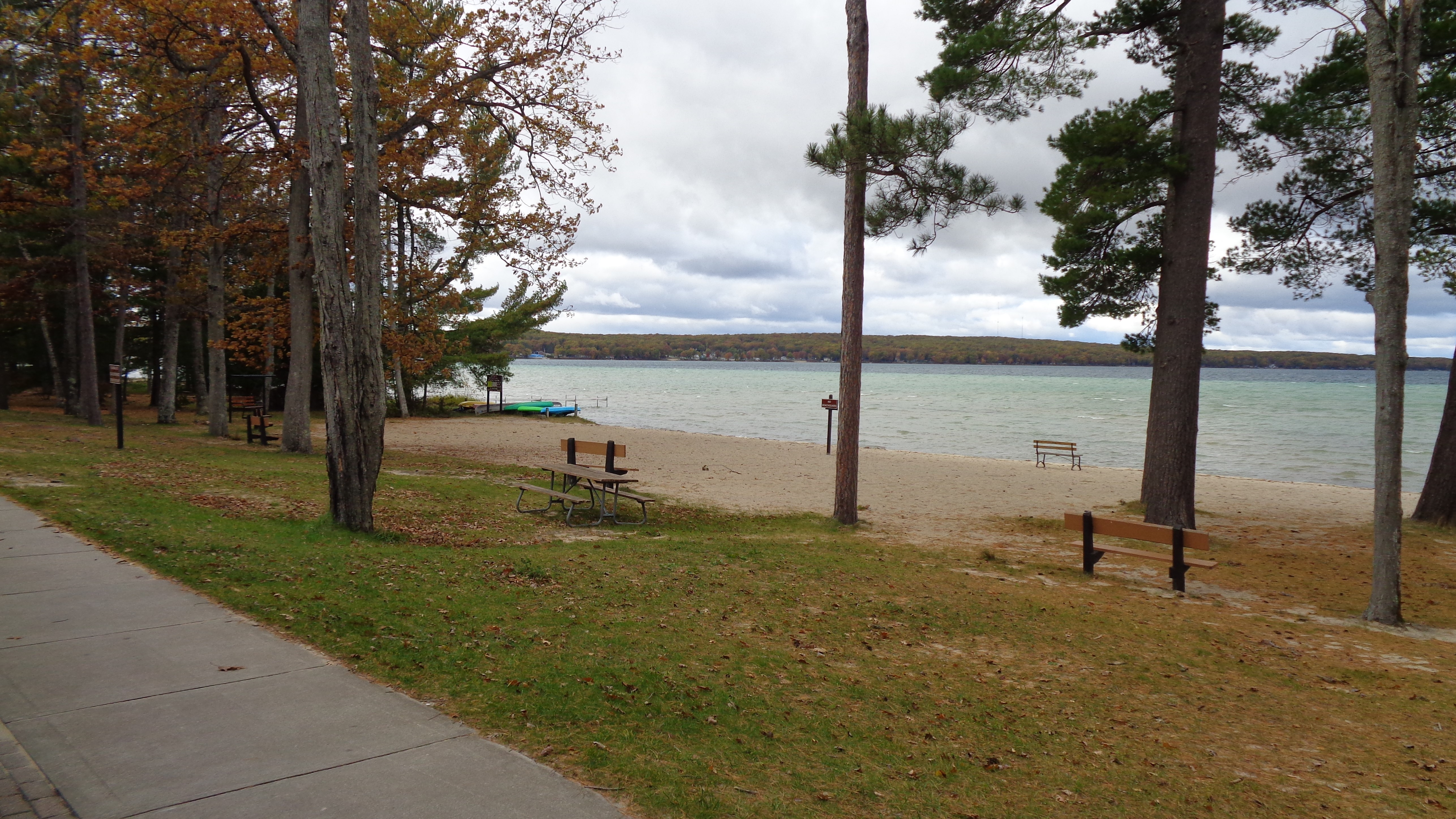
- Beachfront area along Higgins Lake

- Location within Michigan Location within the United States
- Location: Gerrish and Markey townships, Roscommon County, Michigan, United States
- Nearest city: Grayling, Michigan
- Coordinates: 44°25′22″N 84°40′09″W
- Area: 1,364 acres (552 ha)
- Elevation: 1,152 feet (351 m)
- Established: 1927
- Administrator: Michigan Department of Natural Resources
- Designation: Michigan state park
- Website: Official website

South Higgins Lake State Park is a public recreation area covering 1,364 acres (552 ha) on the southern shore of Higgins Lake five miles southwest of Roscommon in Roscommon County, Michigan. The state park occupies one mile of shoreline on Higgins Lake and entirely surrounds Marl Lake and portions of the Cut River.

== Description ==
County Road 100 runs through the park, dividing it into north and south sections. Most park development is in the 300-acre (120 ha) north section between Higgins Lake and CR 100. The 700-acre (280 ha) Marl Lake section is less developed and has 5.5 miles (8.9 km) of hiking trails. The park has a mixed pine, oak and maple forest. Bird species include nesting bald eagles, migratory loons, kingfisher and turkey.

== History ==
Originally covering 100 acres (40 ha), the park opened in 1927 with a 15-unit campground that has since expanded to 400 units, making it the second largest camping area in the Michigan state park system. The park saw a major increase in size in 1984 when the state acquired the 700-acre portion of the park surrounding Marl Lake after development efforts by private interests failed.

== Activities and amenities ==
The park offers swimming, boating, and fishing along one mile of Higgins Lake shoreline, five miles of trails for hiking and cross-country skiing, hunting, picnicking, and a 400-site campground.
