= Lyon Township, Roscommon County, Michigan =

Lyon Township, Michigan
- Civil township
- Lyon Township Office and Library

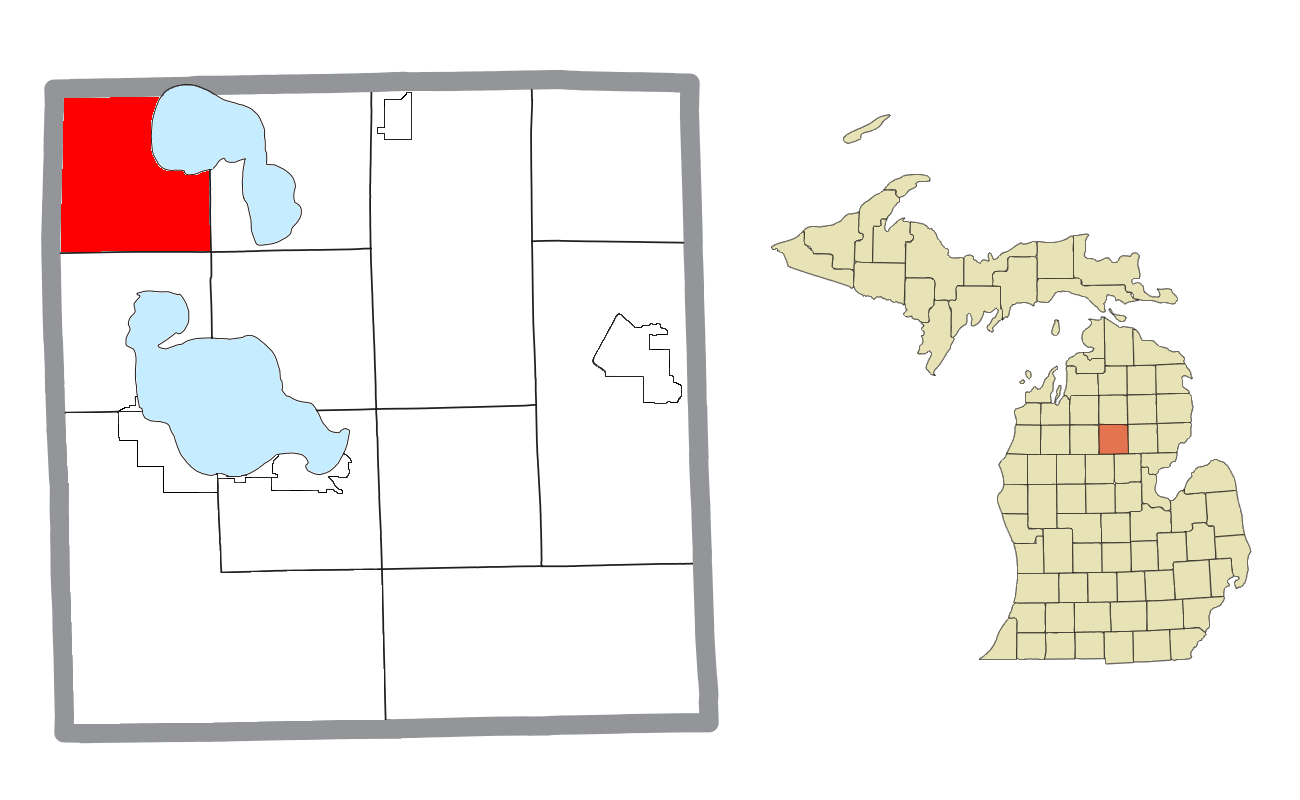
- Location within Roscommon County

- Location within the state of Michigan Location within the United States
- Coordinates: 44°28′44″N 84°46′43″W
- Country: United States
- State: Michigan
- County: Roscommon
- Established: 1921

Government
  - Supervisor: Larry Maduri
  - Clerk: Doug Schnell

Area
  - Total: 36.53 sq mi (94.6 km^{2})
  - Land: 29.98 sq mi (77.6 km^{2})
  - Water: 6.51 sq mi (16.9 km^{2})
- Elevation: 1,217 ft (371 m)

Population (2020)
  - Total: 1,252
  - Density: 41.8/sq mi (16.1/km^{2})
- Time zone: UTC-5 (Eastern (EST))
  - Summer (DST): UTC-4 (EDT)
- ZIP code(s): 48627 (Higgins Lake); 48653 (Roscommon)
- Area code: 989
- FIPS code: 26-49840
- GNIS feature ID: 1626651
- Website: Official website

Lyon Township is a civil township of Roscommon County in the U.S. state of Michigan. The population was 1,252 at the 2020 census.

== Communities ==
- Higgins Lake is an unincorporated community within the township at 44°29′01″N 84°46′47″W. The Higgins Lake 48627 ZIP Code serves a small portion of the township.
- Hillcrest is an unincorporated community within the township at 44°27′53″N 84°46′23″W.
- Lyon Manor is an unincorporated community within the township at 44°27′41″N 84°44′38″W.
- Lyon Town Hall is a former settlement founded in 1902 by hotel owner Charles Lyon. The township would later be named after him when it was established in 1921 from the western section of Gerrish Township.
- Tent City is an uninhabited unincorporated community located in the northwest corner of the township at 44°30′04″N 84°49′23″W.

== Geography ==
According to the U.S. Census Bureau, the township has a total area of 36.53 square miles (94.61 km^{2}), of which 29.98 square miles (77.65 km^{2}) is land and 6.51 square miles (16.86 km^{2}) (17.82%) is water. Lyon Township has a coastline along Higgins Lake.

== Demographics ==
As of the census of 2000, there were 1,462 people, 688 households, and 467 families residing in the township. The population density was 48.8 inhabitants per square mile (18.8/km^{2}). There were 2,267 housing units at an average density of 75.6 per square mile (29.2/km^{2}). The racial makeup of the township was 98.56% White, 0.14% African American, 0.21% Native American, 0.14% Asian, 0.07% from other races, and 0.89% from two or more races. Hispanic or Latino of any race were 1.71% of the population.

There were 688 households, out of which 17.4% had children under the age of 18 living with them, 59.4% were married couples living together, 5.4% had a female householder with no husband present, and 32.1% were non-families. 28.9% of all households were made up of individuals, and 14.0% had someone living alone who was 65 years of age or older. The average household size was 2.13 and the average family size was 2.55.

In the township the population was spread out, with 16.3% under the age of 18, 3.6% from 18 to 24, 19.4% from 25 to 44, 31.7% from 45 to 64, and 29.0% who were 65 years of age or older. The median age was 52 years. For every 100 females, there were 106.2 males. For every 100 females age 18 and over, there were 103.5 males.

The median income for a household in the township was $33,226, and the median income for a family was $37,875. Males had a median income of $32,237 versus $21,583 for females. The per capita income for the township was $19,232. About 6.4% of families and 10.8% of the population were below the poverty line, including 22.3% of those under age 18 and 1.7% of those age 65 or over.
