= Markey Township, Michigan =

- Civil township
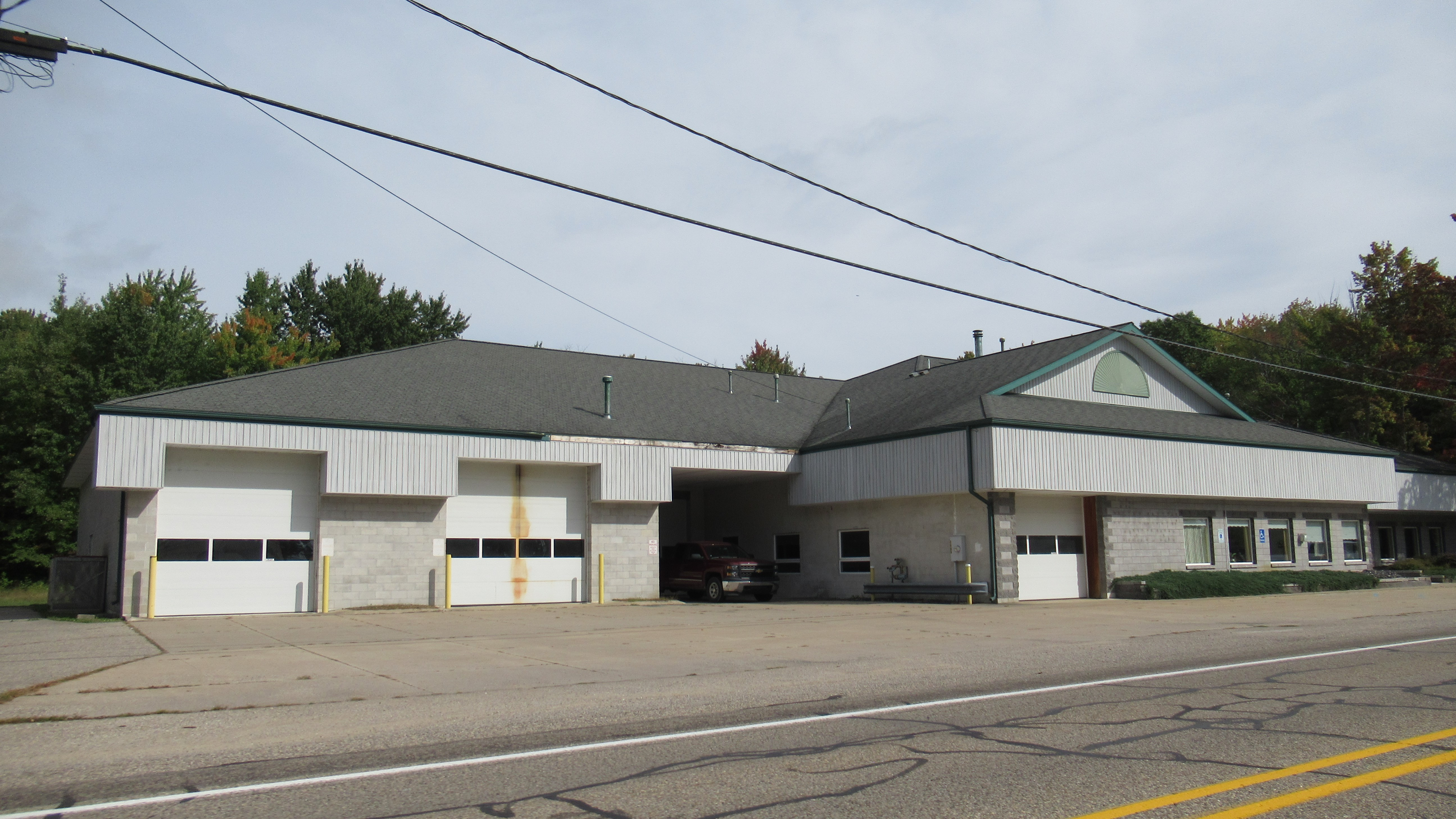
- Markey Township Hall

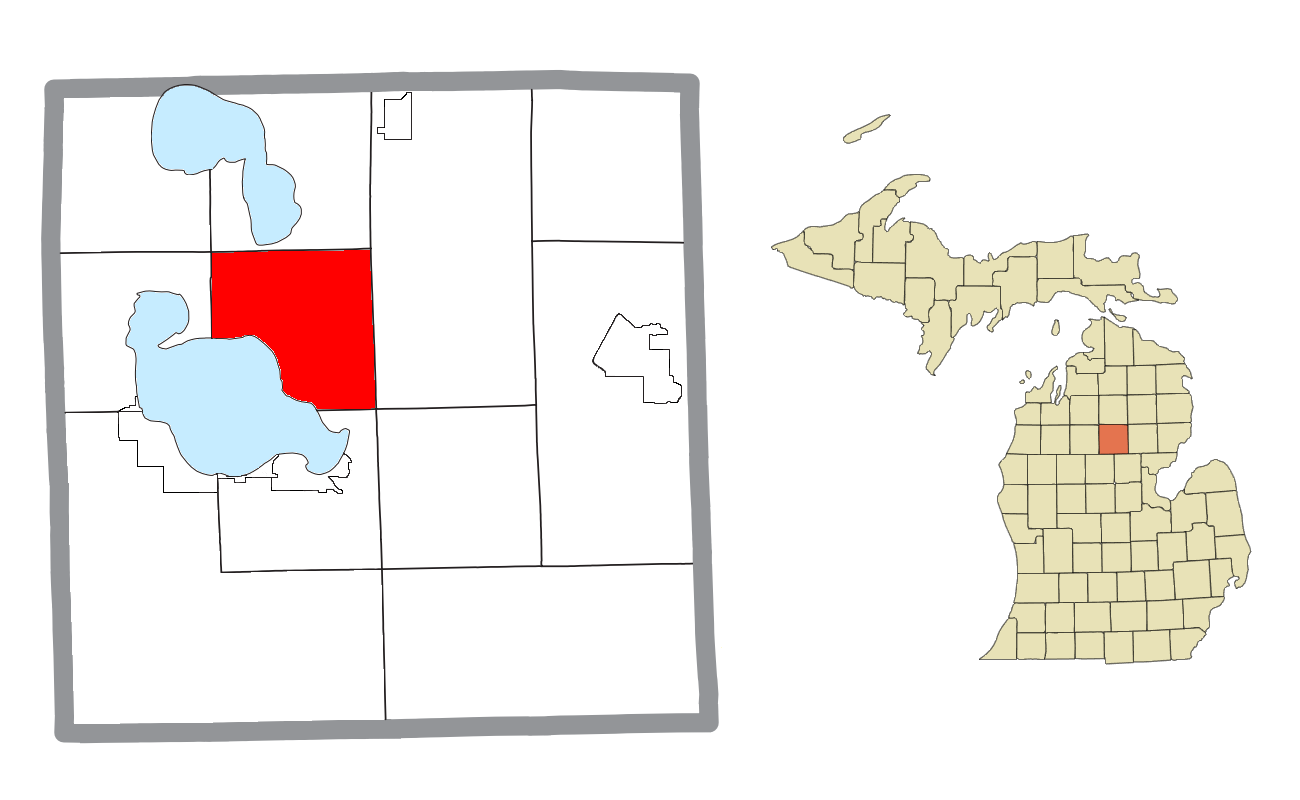
- Location within Roscommon County

- Location within the state of Michigan Markey Township (the United States)
- Coordinates: 44°23′18″N 84°40′44″W
- Country: United States
- State: Michigan
- County: Roscommon
- Established: 1887

Government
  - Supervisor: Robert Pray
  - Clerk: Sheryl Tussey

Area
  - Total: 36.10 sq mi (93.5 km^{2})
  - Land: 28.73 sq mi (74.4 km^{2})
  - Water: 7.37 sq mi (19.1 km^{2})
- Elevation: 1,150 ft (350 m)

Population (2020)
  - Total: 2,401
  - Density: 83.6/sq mi (32.3/km^{2})
- Time zone: UTC-5 (Eastern (EST))
  - Summer (DST): UTC-4 (EDT)
- ZIP code(s): 48629 (Houghton Lake); 48653 (Roscommon)
- Area code: 989
- FIPS code: 26-51780
- GNIS feature ID: 1626693
- Website: Official website

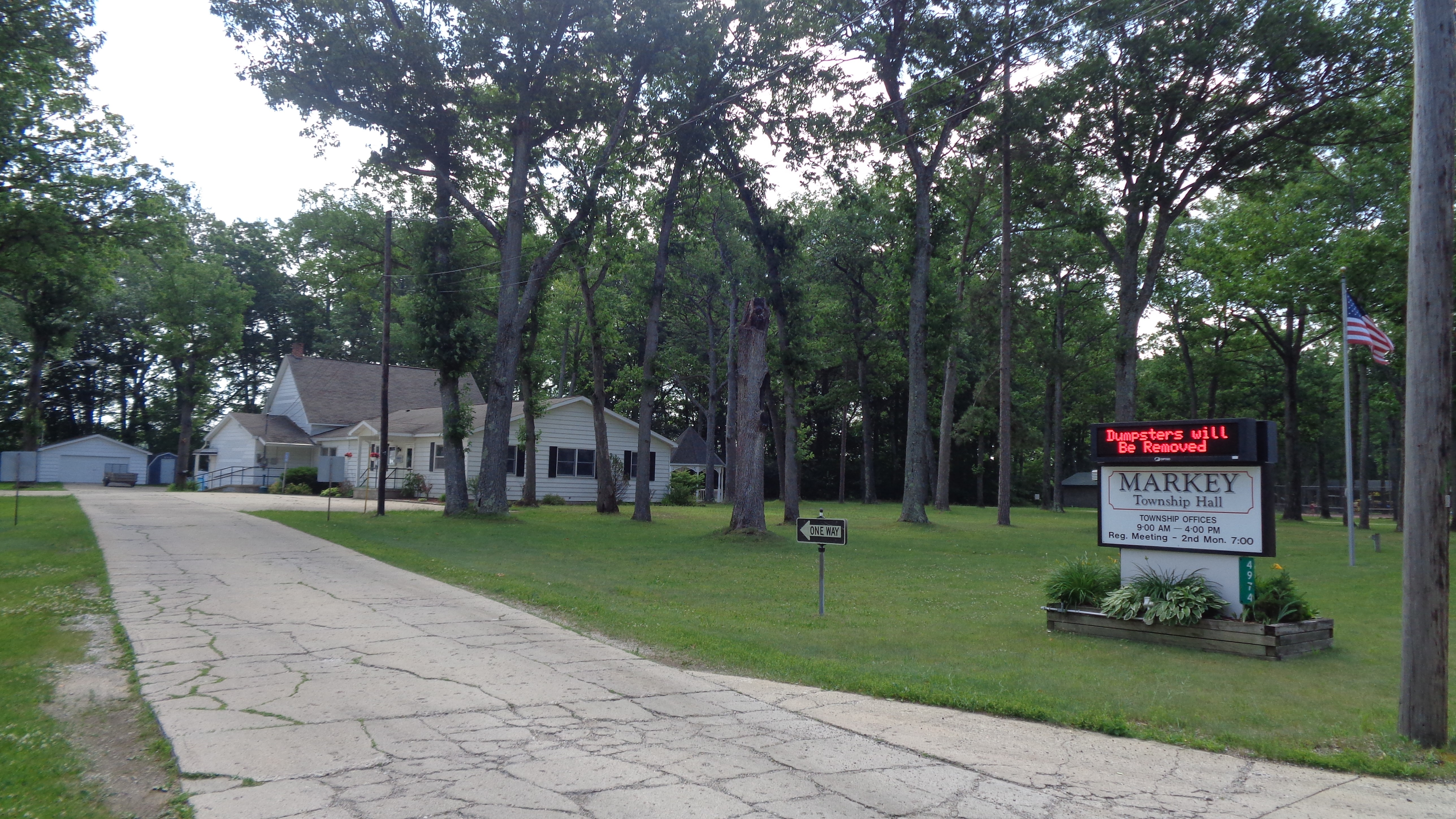
Former township hall used until 2021

Markey Township is a civil township of Roscommon County in the U.S. state of Michigan. The population was 2,401 at the 2020 census. The township was created from Gerrish Township on April 21, 1887.

== Communities ==
- Sharps Corner is an unincorporated community located near South Higgins Lake State Park along the township line with Gerrish Township at 44°25′16″N 84°41′01″W.

== Geography ==
According to the U.S. Census Bureau, the township has a total area of 36.10 square miles (93.5 km^{2}), of which 28.73 square miles (74.4 km^{2}) is land and 7.37 square miles (19.1 km^{2}) (20.42%) is water.

Markey Township has a coastline on Houghton Lake to the south, as well as a small portion on Marl Lake and South Higgins Lake State Park to the north. The Cut River flows from Marl Lake down to Houghton Lake within Markey Township.

== Demographics ==
As of the census of 2000, there were 2,424 people, 1,100 households, and 764 families residing in the township. The population density was 83.8 inhabitants per square mile (32.4/km^{2}). There were 2,396 housing units at an average density of 82.9 per square mile (32.0/km^{2}). The racial makeup of the township was 98.06% White, 0.37% African American, 0.17% Native American, 0.25% Asian, 0.08% Pacific Islander, 0.29% from other races, and 0.78% from two or more races. Hispanic or Latino of any race were 0.91% of the population.

There were 1,100 households, out of which 19.0% had children under the age of 18 living with them, 60.1% were married couples living together, 6.9% had a female householder with no husband present, and 30.5% were non-families. 26.4% of all households were made up of individuals, and 15.2% had someone living alone who was 65 years of age or older. The average household size was 2.20 and the average family size was 2.60.

In the township the population was spread out, with 17.6% under the age of 18, 5.8% from 18 to 24, 18.3% from 25 to 44, 31.5% from 45 to 64, and 26.8% who were 65 years of age or older. The median age was 51 years. For every 100 females, there were 103.7 males. For every 100 females age 18 and over, there were 99.1 males.

The median income for a household in the township was $29,505, and the median income for a family was $34,392. Males had a median income of $32,462 versus $18,864 for females. The per capita income for the township was $18,213. About 6.2% of families and 9.4% of the population were below the poverty line, including 15.7% of those under age 18 and 5.1% of those age 65 or over.
