= The Cut (Michigan) =

River in Michigan, United States

The Cut Cut River
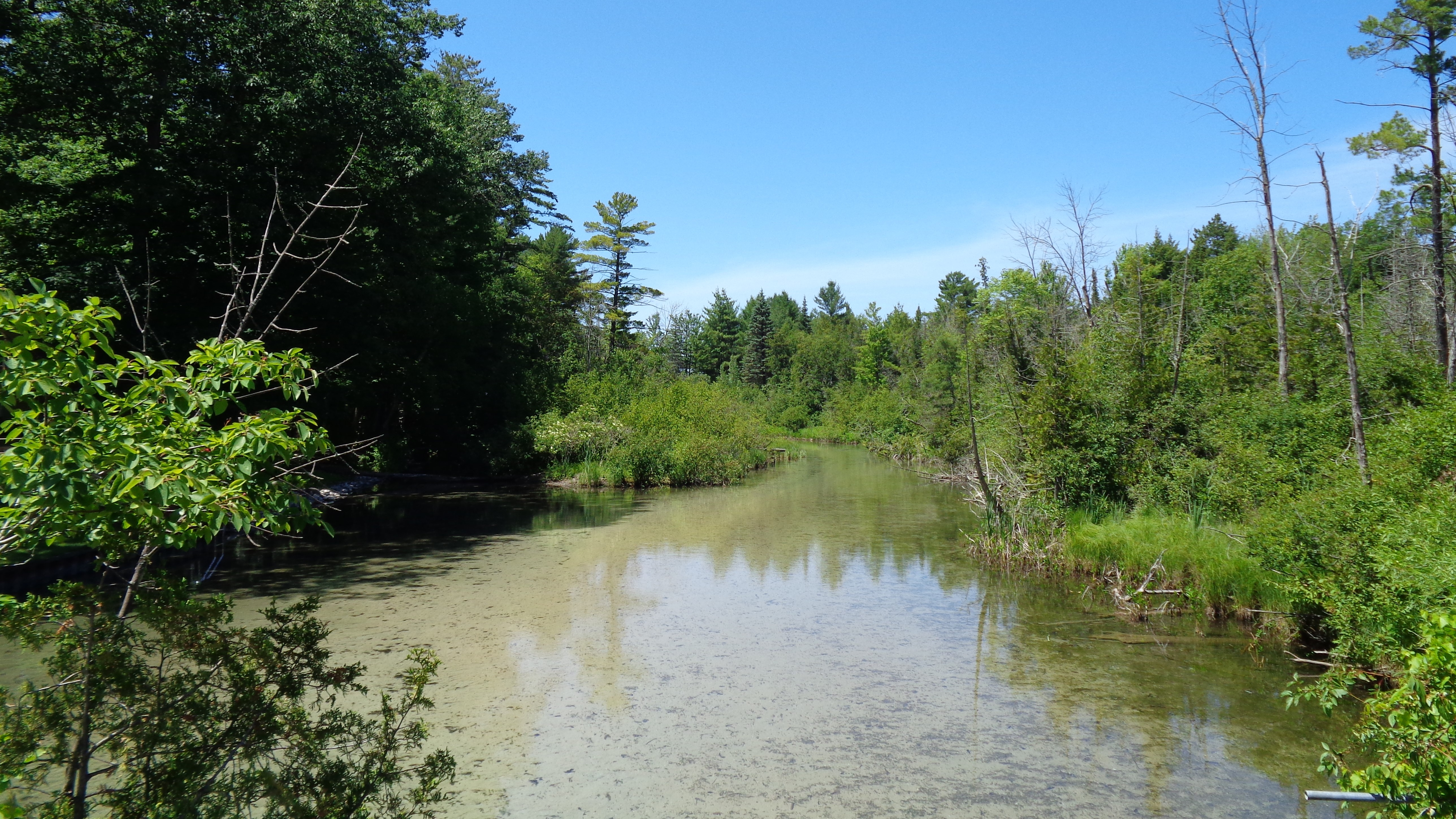
- The Cut River in Gerrish Township

- Location within the state of Michigan

Location
- Country: United States
- State: Michigan
- County: Roscommon

Physical characteristics
- Source: Higgins Lake
  - location: Gerrish Township, Michigan
  - coordinates: 44°26′05″N 84°40′19″W
  - elevation: 1,155 ft (352 m)
- Mouth: Houghton Lake
  - location: Markey Township, Michigan
  - coordinates: 44°21′35″N 84°41′09″W
  - elevation: 1,138 ft (347 m)
- Length: 10 mi (16 km)

Basin features
- Waterbodies: Marl Lake

The Cut is a small river located entirely within Roscommon County in the U.S. state of Michigan. Also referred to sometimes as the Cut River, it begins at Higgins Lake and meanders to Houghton Lake at a length of approximately 10 miles (16 km). It also passes through the small Marl Lake within South Higgins Lake State Park near its source.

== Activities ==
Historically, the Cut River served to transport lumber from the Higgins Lake area to Houghton Lake. Portions of the river were dredged to allow for lumber transport during the late-1800s, although no remnant of this exist today.

The Cut is a popular fishing destination because of its calm, undeveloped, and scenic environment, which allows for easy use for smaller canoes and kayaks. A single public access point is available at Marl Lake. The river only has three bridge crossings: East Higgins Lake Drive, West Lansing Road, and near its mouth along East Houghton Lake Drive (County Road 100). A small dam was constructed near the river head, which prevents navigating from Houghton Lake to Higgins Lake without portaging over the dam at Higgins Lake.

== Water levels ==
The river serves an important purpose to regulate the water level within Higgins Lake, which also affects the water level of Houghton Lake. A small dam was constructed across the Cut River near Higgins Lake for this purpose. A bridge along East Higgins Lake Drive passes over the inconspicuous dam. The Michigan Department of Natural Resources closely monitors the water levels within the Cut River, as it is a popular spawning location for walleye in Houghton Lake. Because of the small dam, fish within Houghton Lake can no longer travel to Higgins Lake. Depending on the fluctuating water level within Higgins Lake, the Cut River may endure periods of very low water levels that can adversely affect fish populations. Other common fish along the river include smallmouth bass, yellow perch, trout, and northern pike.

The river has a very low watershed until it meets with Backus Creek nearer Houghton Lake. In recent years, residents along the Higgins Lake shoreline have complained about increasing coastal erosion because of rising water levels within Higgins Lake, which are controlled by the small dam along the Cut River. Scientific evaluation constantly monitors the water level and flow within the Cut River, as it can affect the water levels of Higgins Lake, Houghton Lake, and even leading to the Muskegon River going to Lake Michigan.
