= Roscommon County, Michigan =

County in Michigan, United States

- County
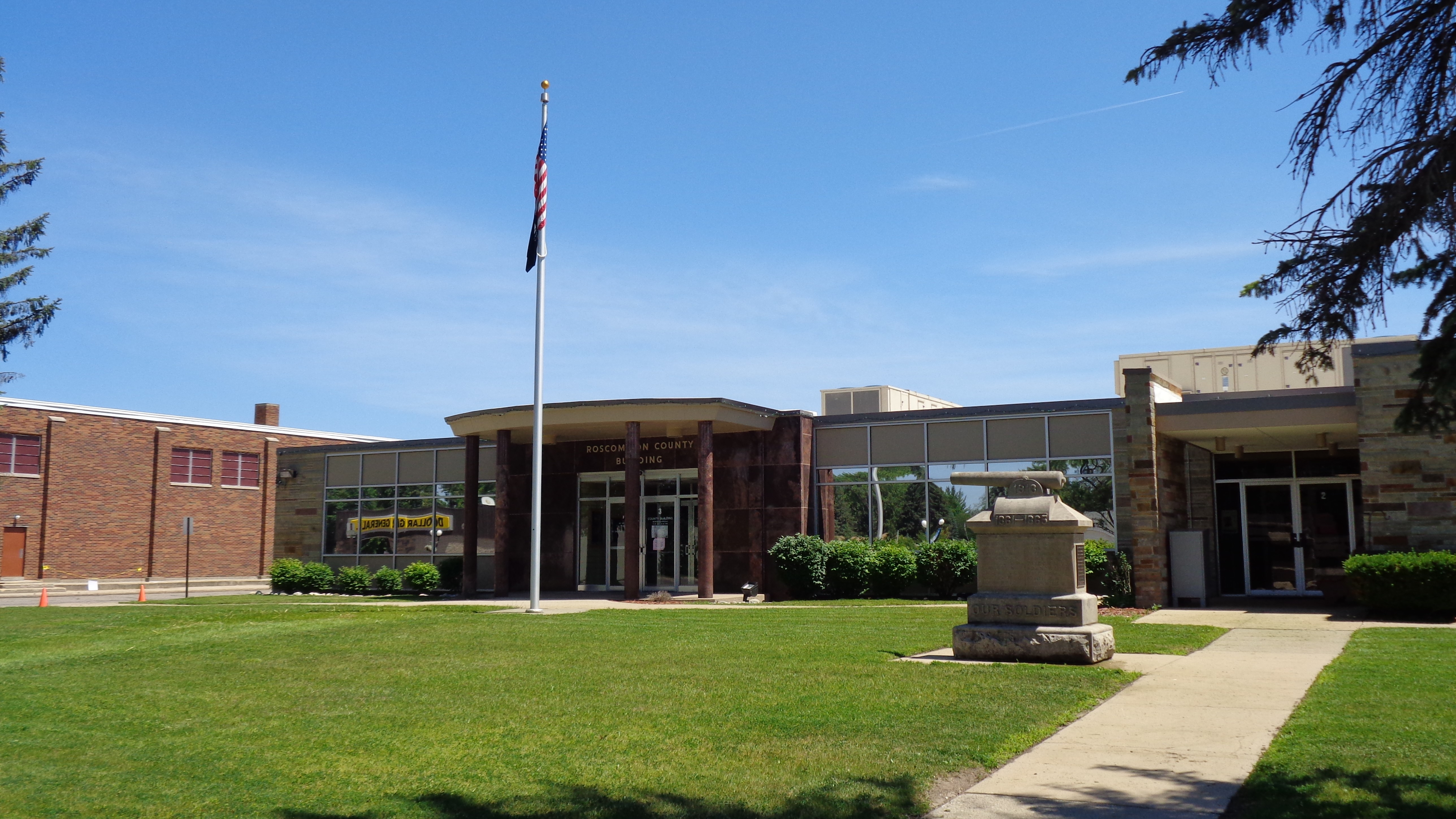
- Roscommon County Building in Roscommon

- Location within the U.S. state of Michigan
- Coordinates: 44°20′N 84°37′W
- Country: United States
- State: Michigan
- Created: 1840
- Organized: 1875
- Named for: County Roscommon, Ireland
- Seat: Roscommon
- Largest settlement: Houghton Lake; Roscommon (incorporated)

Area
  - Total: 580 sq mi (1,500 km^{2})
  - Land: 520 sq mi (1,300 km^{2})
  - Water: 60 sq mi (160 km^{2}) 10%

Population (2020)
  - Total: 23,459
  - Estimate (2025): 23,914 ▲
  - Density: 47/sq mi (18/km^{2})
- Time zone: UTC−5 (Eastern)
  - Summer (DST): UTC−4 (EDT)
- Congressional district: 1st
- Website: roscommoncounty.net

Roscommon County (/rɒsˈkɒmən/ ross-KOM-ən) is a county located in the U.S. state of Michigan. As of the 2020 census, the population was 23,459. The county seat is Roscommon. The county was founded in 1840 and organized in 1875. The county is home to Houghton Lake, the largest inland lake in Michigan.

== History ==
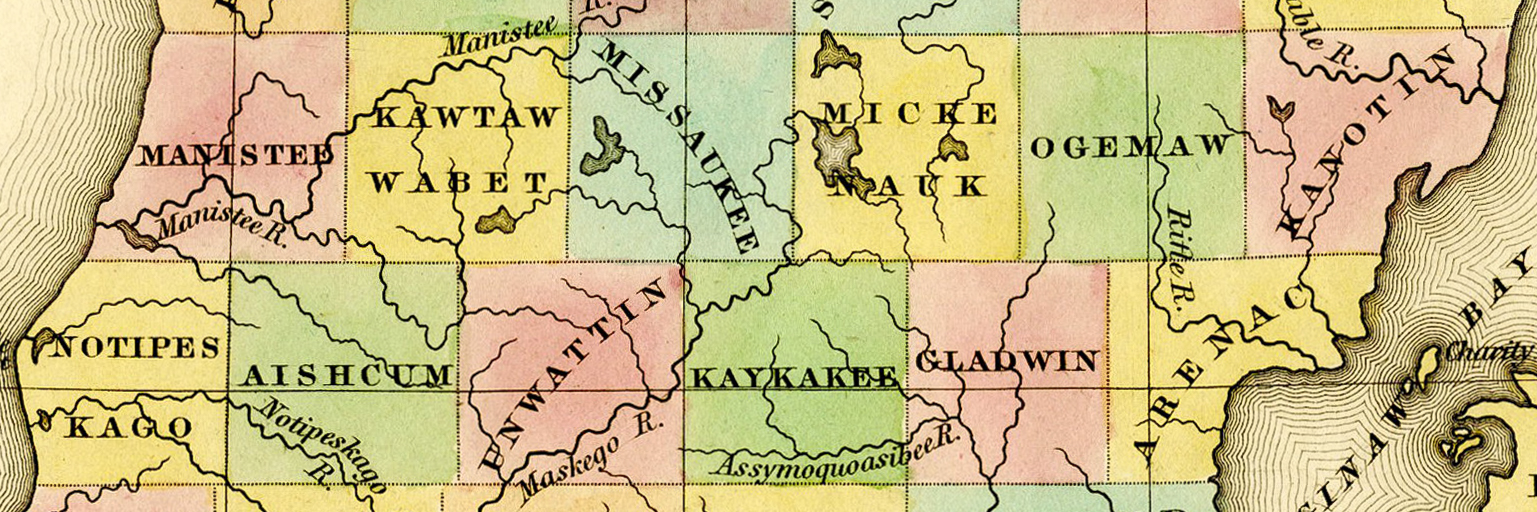
A detail from A New Map of Michigan with its Canals, Roads & Distances (1842) by Henry Schenck Tanner, showing Roscommon County as "Mickenauk" (a misspelling of Mikenauk, the county's name from 1840 to 1843.) Several nearby counties are also shown with names that would later be changed.

The county was formed by the Michigan Legislature in 1840 as Mikenauk County, (from Ojibwe mikinaak meaning turtle) then renamed Roscommon County in 1843. It was administered by Michilimackinac (Mackinac), Cheboygan, and Midland counties, in succession, prior to the organization of county government in 1875. Roscommon County was named after County Roscommon, Ireland.

There are three official Michigan historical markers in the county:

- Gerrish
- Pioneer House
- Terney House

== Geography ==
According to the US Census Bureau, the county has a total area of 580 square miles (1,500 km^{2}), of which 520 square miles (1,300 km^{2}) is land and 60 square miles (160 km^{2}) (10%) is water. Roscommon County is considered to be part of Northern Michigan. Part of Michigan's Au Sable State Forest falls within the county. The US Forest Service's Roscoe Fire Management Unit includes Ogemaw and Roscommon Counties.

=== Geographic features ===
During prehistoric times, glacial action helped shape the Michigan-area terrain. A large portion of the area is the Grayling outwash plain, which includes sandy ice-disintegration ridges; jack pine barrens, white pine-red pine forest, and northern hardwood forest. Large lakes were created by glacial action.

Prominent geographic features include:

- Au Sable River
- Backus Creek
- Cut River
- Dead Stream Flooding
- Higgins Lake
- Houghton Lake, the largest inland lake in Michigan
- Houghton Lake Flats
- Lake St. Helen
- Marl Lake
- Roscommon Virgin Pine Stand – a 160-acre (650,000 m^{2}) parcel within the Au Sable State Forest, 8 miles (13 km) north of St. Helen, Michigan, and 8 miles east of Roscommon. An old-growth stand of red pine, which includes a former national champion red pine.
- Underground oil deposits

=== Major highways ===
- I-75 – runs south, SE, and east through the NE middle portion of county.
- US 127 – runs north–south through west portion of county. Passes on west side of Higgins and Houghton Lakes.
- M-18 – runs north–south through center of county. Passes Roscommon and Prudenville. Leaving Roscommon, runs east along north line of county for 5.6 miles (9.0 km) before turning to NE.
- M-55 – runs east–west through center of county to intersection with I75, 7 miles (11 km) west of east line of county.
- M-157 – short (1.1 mi; 1.8 km) north-south spur connecting M18 to M55, east of Houghton Lake.
- F-18 – runs south from Prudenville. Exits the county on the line between Clare and Gladwin counties.

=== Airports ===
- Houghton Lake State Airport is located in Roscommon Township.
- Roscommon County–Blodgett Memorial Airport is located in Markey Township.

=== Adjacent counties ===
- Crawford County – north
- Oscoda County – northeast
- Ogemaw County – east
- Gladwin County – southeast
- Clare County – southwest
- Missaukee County – west
- Kalkaska County – northwest

== Communities ==
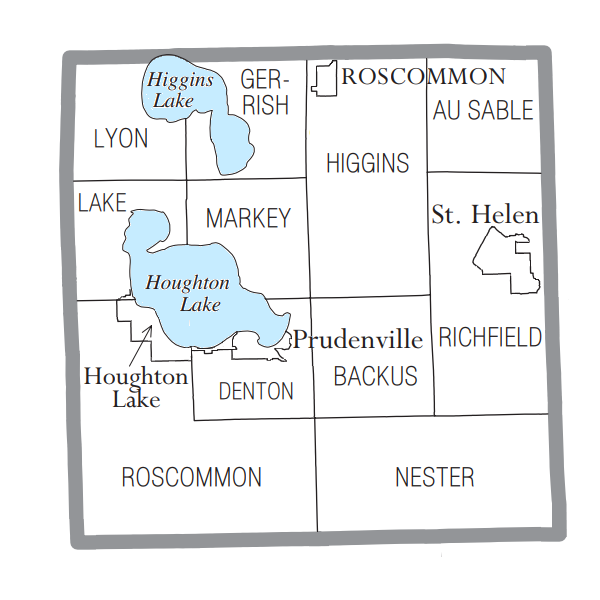
U.S. Census data map showing local municipal boundaries within Roscommon County, as well as CDP boundaries

=== Village ===
- Roscommon (county seat)

=== Civil townships ===
- Au Sable Township
- Backus Township
- Denton Township
- Gerrish Township
- Higgins Township
- Lake Township
- Lyon Township
- Markey Township
- Nester Township
- Richfield Township
- Roscommon Township

=== Census-designated places ===
- Houghton Lake
- Prudenville
- St. Helen

=== Other unincorporated communities ===
- Artesia Beach
- Au Sable River Park
- Geels
- Higgins Lake
- Hillcrest
- Houghton Lake Heights
- Houghton Point
- Keno
- Loxley
- Lyon Manor
- Maple Valley
- Meads Landing
- Michelson
- Nellsville
- Sharps Corner
- Tent City

== Demographics ==
Historical population
| Census | Pop. | Note | %± |
|---|---|---|---|
| 1880 | 1,459 | | — |
| 1890 | 2,033 | | 39.3% |
| 1900 | 1,787 | | −12.1% |
| 1910 | 2,274 | | 27.3% |
| 1920 | 2,032 | | −10.6% |
| 1930 | 2,055 | | 1.1% |
| 1940 | 3,668 | | 78.5% |
| 1950 | 5,916 | | 61.3% |
| 1960 | 7,200 | | 21.7% |
| 1970 | 9,892 | | 37.4% |
| 1980 | 16,374 | | 65.5% |
| 1990 | 19,776 | | 20.8% |
| 2000 | 25,469 | | 28.8% |
| 2010 | 24,449 | | −4.0% |
| 2020 | 23,459 | | −4.0% |
| 2025 (est.) | 23,914 | ▲ | 1.9% |
US Decennial Census; 1790-1960 1900-1990; 1990-2000 2010-2018

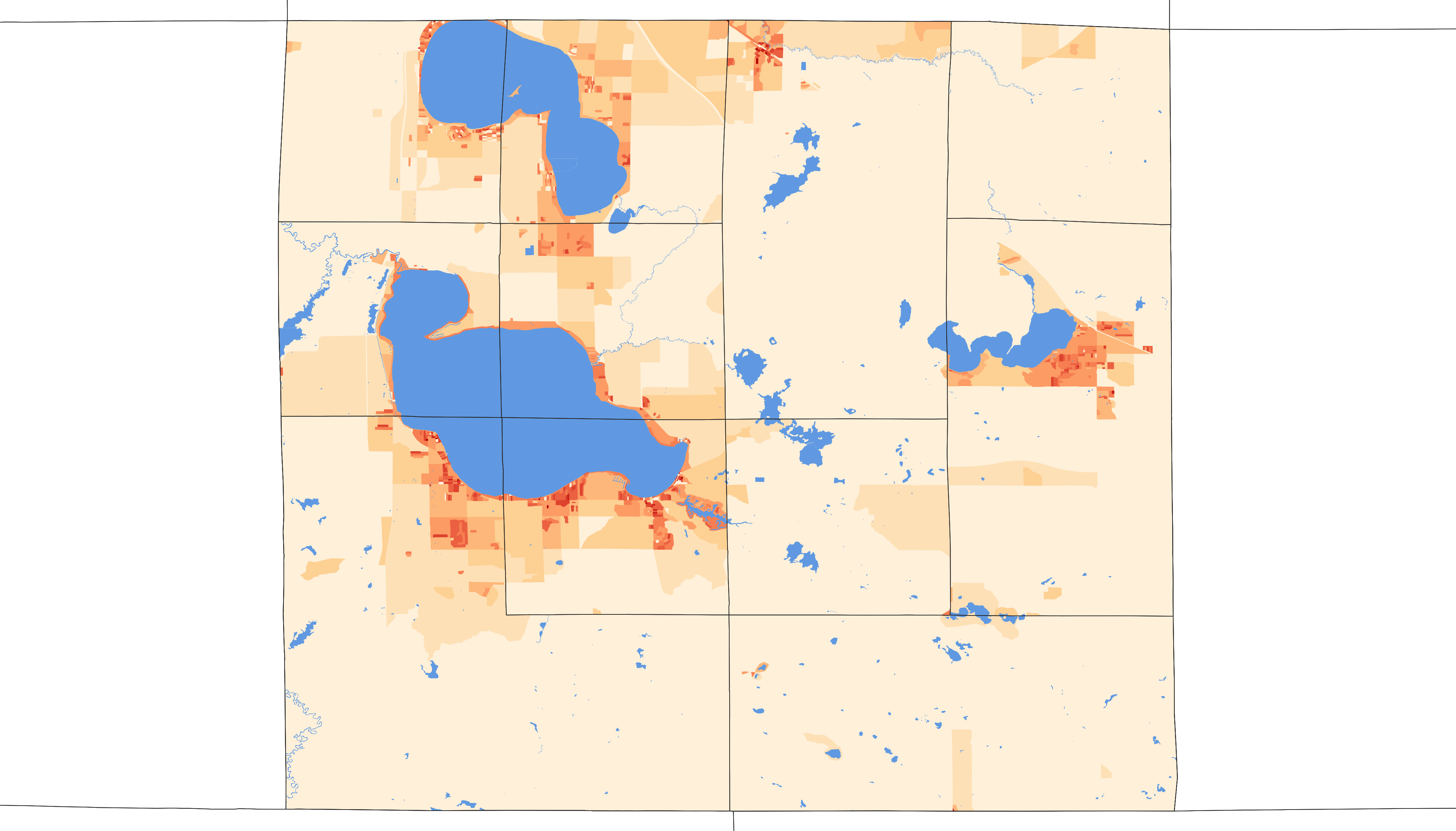
2020 population density of Roscommon County MI by census block

=== Racial and ethnic composition ===
Roscommon County, Michigan – Racial and ethnic composition Note: the US Census treats Hispanic/Latino as an ethnic category. This table excludes Latinos from the racial categories and assigns them to a separate category. Hispanics/Latinos may be of any race.
| Race / Ethnicity (NH = Non-Hispanic) | Pop 1980 | Pop 1990 | Pop 2000 | Pop 2010 | Pop 2020 | % 1980 | % 1990 | % 2000 | % 2010 | % 2020 |
|---|---|---|---|---|---|---|---|---|---|---|
| White alone (NH) | 16,239 | 19,521 | 24,795 | 23,592 | 21,883 | 99.18% | 98.71% | 97.35% | 96.49% | 93.28% |
| Black or African American alone (NH) | 0 | 37 | 81 | 89 | 60 | 0.00% | 0.19% | 0.32% | 0.36% | 0.26% |
| Native American or Alaska Native alone (NH) | 51 | 101 | 158 | 136 | 94 | 0.31% | 0.51% | 0.62% | 0.56% | 0.40% |
| Asian alone (NH) | 15 | 23 | 49 | 72 | 76 | 0.09% | 0.12% | 0.19% | 0.29% | 0.32% |
| Native Hawaiian or Pacific Islander alone (NH) | x | x | 10 | 2 | 10 | x | x | 0.04% | 0.01% | 0.04% |
| Other race alone (NH) | 5 | 0 | 7 | 3 | 47 | 0.03% | 0.00% | 0.03% | 0.01% | 0.20% |
| Mixed race or Multiracial (NH) | x | x | 165 | 280 | 855 | x | x | 0.65% | 1.15% | 3.64% |
| Hispanic or Latino (any race) | 64 | 94 | 204 | 275 | 434 | 0.39% | 0.48% | 0.80% | 1.12% | 1.85% |
| Total | 16,374 | 19,776 | 25,469 | 24,449 | 23,459 | 100.00% | 100.00% | 100.00% | 100.00% | 100.00% |

=== 2020 census ===
As of the 2020 census, the county had a population of 23,459. The median age was 56.6 years. 14.2% of residents were under the age of 18 and 33.0% of residents were 65 years of age or older. For every 100 females there were 101.0 males, and for every 100 females age 18 and over there were 100.1 males age 18 and over.

As of the 2020 census, the racial makeup of the county was 94.1% White, 0.3% Black or African American, 0.4% American Indian and Alaska Native, 0.3% Asian, <0.1% Native Hawaiian and Pacific Islander, 0.5% from some other race, and 4.4% from two or more races. Hispanic or Latino residents of any race comprised 1.9% of the population.

As of the 2020 census, 56.1% of residents lived in urban areas, while 43.9% lived in rural areas.

As of the 2020 census, there were 11,415 households in the county, of which 16.3% had children under the age of 18 living in them. Of all households, 44.5% were married-couple households, 22.9% were households with a male householder and no spouse or partner present, and 25.3% were households with a female householder and no spouse or partner present. About 36.1% of all households were made up of individuals and 19.2% had someone living alone who was 65 years of age or older.

As of the 2020 census, there were 23,069 housing units, of which 50.5% were vacant. Among occupied housing units, 81.5% were owner-occupied and 18.5% were renter-occupied. The homeowner vacancy rate was 2.4% and the rental vacancy rate was 8.0%.

=== 2000 census ===
At the 2000 United States census, there were 25,469 people, 11,250 households, and 7,616 families residing in the county. The population density was 49 people per square mile (19 people/km^{2}). There were 23,109 housing units at an average density of 44 per square mile (17/km^{2}).

In 2000, the racial makeup of the county was 97.99% White, 0.32% Black or African American, 0.64% Native American, 0.19% Asian, 0.04% Pacific Islander, 0.10% from other races, and 0.72% from two or more races. 0.80% of the population were Hispanic or Latino of any race. 24.4% were of German, 12.7% English, 9.9% Irish, 9.2% Polish, 9.2% American and 6.7% French ancestry. 97.2% spoke English as their first language. Those citing "American" ancestry in Roscommon County are of overwhelmingly English extraction, however most English Americans identify simply as having American ancestry because their roots have been in North America for so long, in some cases since the 1600s.

== Attractions and events ==
The community is centered in the area of two very large lakes, in the middle of large state forests. Wildlife are nearby, including bear, deer, eagles, Kirtland's warblers, and turkeys. Local attractions and activities include:

- Birding
- Bluegill Festival each summer in St. Helen
- Boating, paddling (canoe and kayak)
- Firemen's Memorial Festival, an annual event (September) since 1979.
- Fishing
- Golf
- Hiking
- Historical Village Days, an annual event (August) held on the grounds of the Houghton Lake Historical Village & Playhouse, since in 1972.
- Hunting
- Kirtland Warbler Habitat and Festival is an annual (held in May) event hosted by Kirtland Community College.
- Michigan Shore-to-Shore Trail, a 500-mile (800 km) system of interconnected trails, passes through the area. It runs from Empire to Oscoda, and points beyond.
- Nordic skiing
- ORV and groomed snowmobile trails
- Sailing
- Tip-up-town winter festival, Houghton Lake, an annual event (held in January).

Roscommon County, Michigan, hosts an event known as Christmas in the Village. This event is held on the first Saturday in December annually. Christmas in the Village began in 1994 when the old Roscommon Middle School was purchased for a dollar and transformed into the community building, called the CRAF Center. The committee for Christmas in the Village was composed of volunteers. Each year features burn barrels, an annual tree lighting, an electric light parade, and more. As time passes, new activities are added annually. Typically, you can find a craft show in the gym of the CRAFT Center and a petting zoo. Vendors set up shops in the CRAF center gym to sell plenty of goods. There is a wide variety, from fudges to quilts. The town gathers to celebrate the holidays together. Santa arrives on the train.

== Government ==
Roscommon County voters tend to vote Republican; they have selected the Republican Party nominee in 75% of national elections (27 of 36).

United States presidential election results for Roscommon County, Michigan
| Year | Republican | | Democratic | | Third party(ies) | |
| Year | No. | % | No. | % | No. | % |
|---|---|---|---|---|---|---|
| 1884 | 427 | 48.80% | 435 | 49.71% | 13 | 1.49% |
| 1888 | 360 | 50.00% | 358 | 49.72% | 2 | 0.28% |
| 1892 | 239 | 44.26% | 286 | 52.96% | 15 | 2.78% |
| 1896 | 282 | 65.43% | 141 | 32.71% | 8 | 1.86% |
| 1900 | 327 | 64.50% | 175 | 34.52% | 5 | 0.99% |
| 1904 | 373 | 71.46% | 116 | 22.22% | 33 | 6.32% |
| 1908 | 427 | 69.43% | 147 | 23.90% | 41 | 6.67% |
| 1912 | 134 | 22.60% | 150 | 25.30% | 309 | 52.11% |
| 1916 | 311 | 53.44% | 239 | 41.07% | 32 | 5.50% |
| 1920 | 652 | 75.29% | 182 | 21.02% | 32 | 3.70% |
| 1924 | 484 | 69.64% | 99 | 14.24% | 112 | 16.12% |
| 1928 | 780 | 76.25% | 236 | 23.07% | 7 | 0.68% |
| 1932 | 601 | 42.62% | 757 | 53.69% | 52 | 3.69% |
| 1936 | 836 | 49.64% | 782 | 46.44% | 66 | 3.92% |
| 1940 | 1,360 | 64.21% | 739 | 34.89% | 19 | 0.90% |
| 1944 | 1,292 | 72.22% | 484 | 27.05% | 13 | 0.73% |
| 1948 | 2,055 | 73.89% | 687 | 24.70% | 39 | 1.40% |
| 1952 | 2,547 | 78.64% | 676 | 20.87% | 16 | 0.49% |
| 1956 | 2,674 | 76.20% | 827 | 23.57% | 8 | 0.23% |
| 1960 | 2,731 | 68.93% | 1,226 | 30.94% | 5 | 0.13% |
| 1964 | 1,722 | 42.27% | 2,345 | 57.56% | 7 | 0.17% |
| 1968 | 2,635 | 55.91% | 1,639 | 34.78% | 439 | 9.31% |
| 1972 | 4,136 | 64.17% | 2,187 | 33.93% | 122 | 1.89% |
| 1976 | 4,608 | 54.85% | 3,691 | 43.94% | 102 | 1.21% |
| 1980 | 5,280 | 54.66% | 3,763 | 38.96% | 616 | 6.38% |
| 1984 | 6,419 | 65.35% | 3,359 | 34.20% | 45 | 0.46% |
| 1988 | 5,866 | 56.93% | 4,394 | 42.65% | 43 | 0.42% |
| 1992 | 4,170 | 34.73% | 5,243 | 43.67% | 2,594 | 21.60% |
| 1996 | 4,135 | 34.94% | 6,092 | 51.48% | 1,607 | 13.58% |
| 2000 | 6,190 | 47.88% | 6,433 | 49.76% | 305 | 2.36% |
| 2004 | 7,364 | 51.28% | 6,810 | 47.43% | 185 | 1.29% |
| 2008 | 6,727 | 47.72% | 7,082 | 50.24% | 287 | 2.04% |
| 2012 | 6,701 | 51.24% | 6,198 | 47.40% | 178 | 1.36% |
| 2016 | 8,141 | 62.16% | 4,287 | 32.74% | 668 | 5.10% |
| 2020 | 9,670 | 64.32% | 5,166 | 34.36% | 198 | 1.32% |
| 2024 | 10,582 | 65.86% | 5,290 | 32.92% | 196 | 1.22% |

United States Senate election results for Roscommon County, Michigan1
| Year | Republican | | Democratic | | Third party(ies) | |
| Year | No. | % | No. | % | No. | % |
|---|---|---|---|---|---|---|
| 2024 | 10,115 | 63.85% | 5,254 | 33.17% | 472 | 2.98% |

Michigan Gubernatorial election results for Roscommon County
| Year | Republican | | Democratic | | Third party(ies) | |
| Year | No. | % | No. | % | No. | % |
|---|---|---|---|---|---|---|
| 2022 | 7,391 | 57.07% | 5,284 | 40.80% | 276 | 2.13% |

The county government operates the jail, maintains rural roads, operates the major local courts, records deeds, mortgages, and vital records, administers public health regulations, and participates with the state in the provision of social services. The county board of commissioners controls the budget and has limited authority to make laws or ordinances. In Michigan, most local government functions — police and fire, building and zoning, tax assessment, street maintenance, etc. — are the responsibility of individual cities and townships.

=== Elected officials ===
- Prosecuting Attorney: Michael Edwards
- Sheriff: Ed Stern
- County Clerk/Register of Deeds: Michelle Stevenson
- County Treasurer: Rebecca A. Ragan
- Drain Commissioner: Pamela Bale

(information as of January 2021)

== See also ==
- List of counties in Michigan
- List of Michigan State Historic Sites in Roscommon County, Michigan
- National Register of Historic Places listings in Roscommon County, Michigan
- County Roscommon
