= Gerrish Township, Michigan =

- Civil township
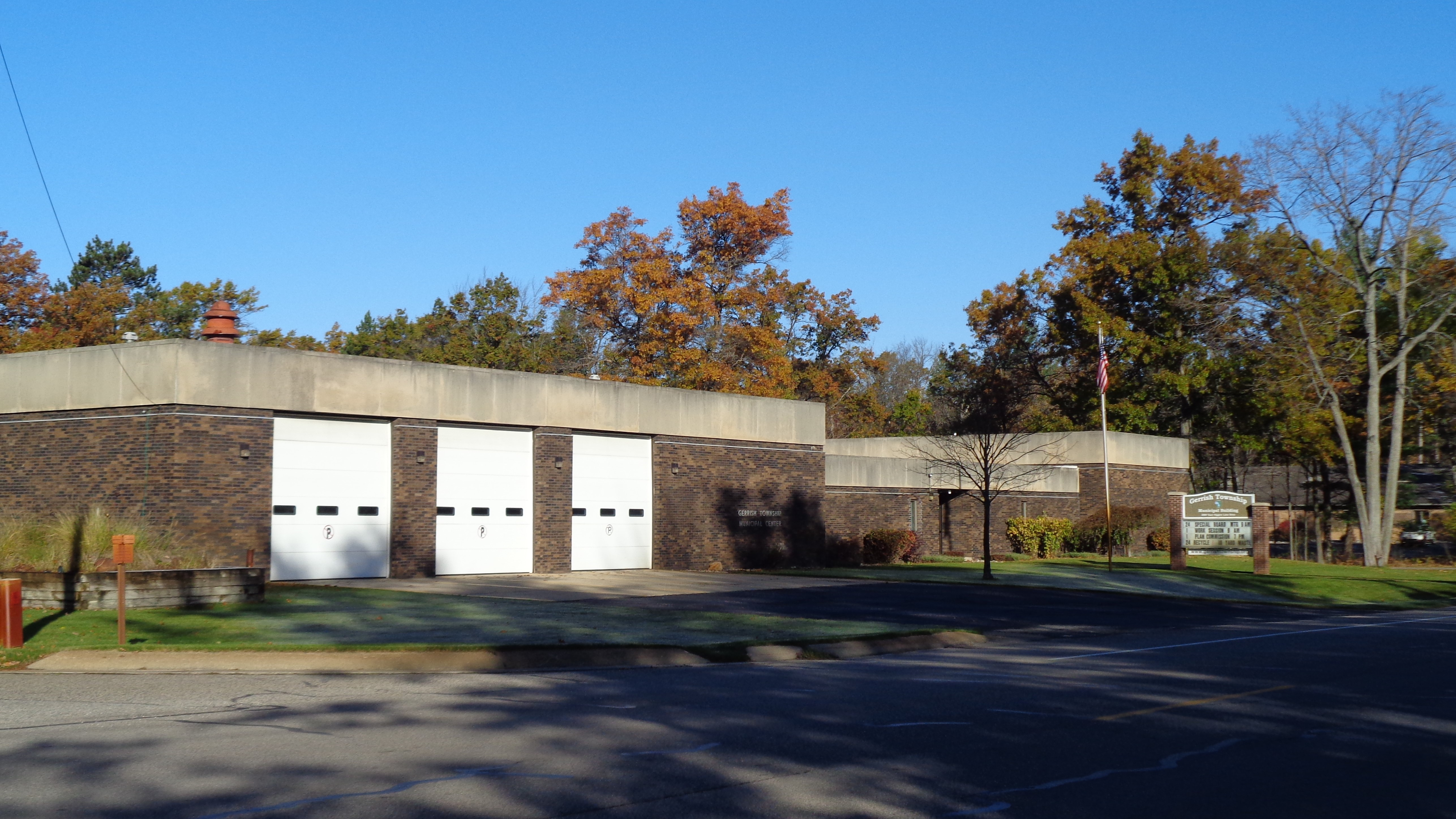
- Gerrish Township Municipal Building

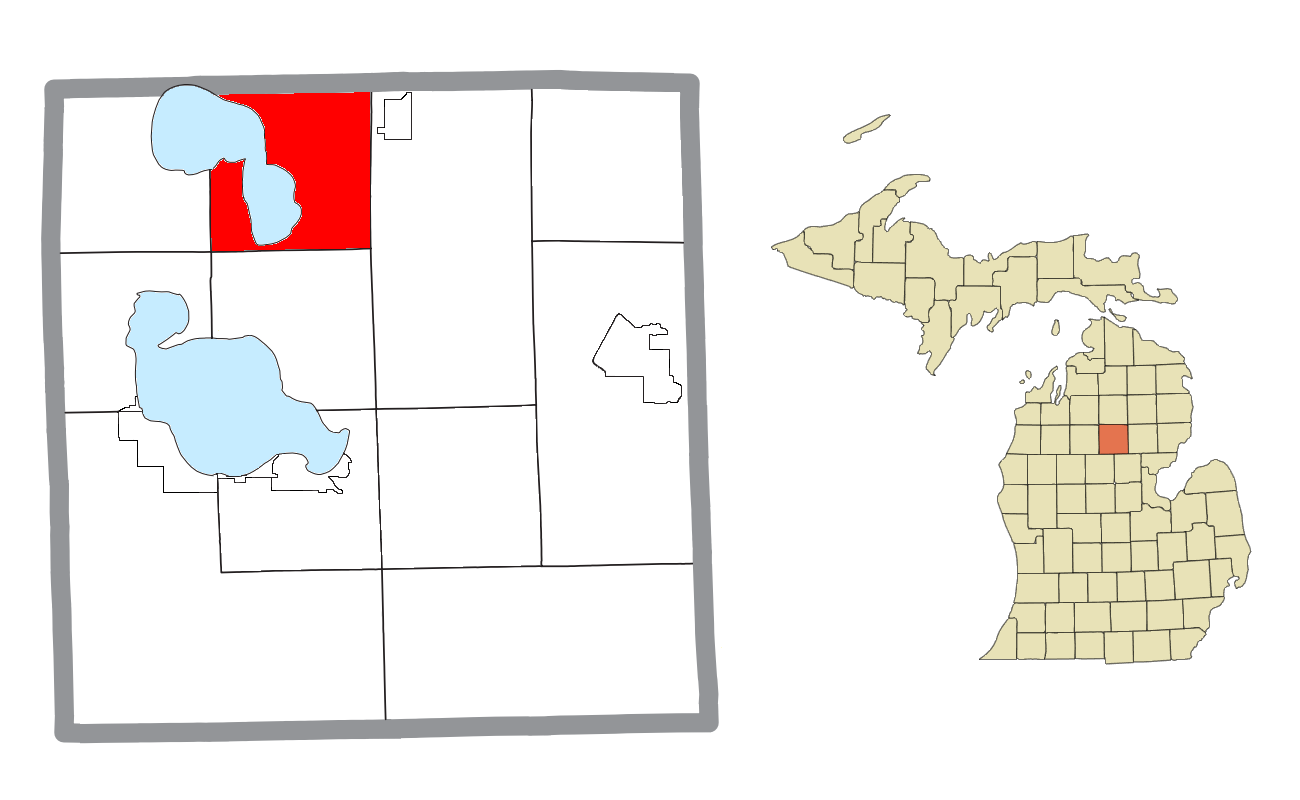
- Location within Roscommon County

- Location within the state of Michigan Gerrish Township (the United States)
- Coordinates: 44°28′05″N 84°41′06″W
- Country: United States
- State: Michigan
- County: Roscommon
- Organized: 1880

Government
  - Supervisor: David Udy
  - Clerk: Kathleen Patchin

Area
  - Total: 37.23 sq mi (96.4 km^{2})
  - Land: 27.60 sq mi (71.5 km^{2})
  - Water: 9.63 sq mi (24.9 km^{2})
- Elevation: 1,158 ft (353 m)

Population (2020)
  - Total: 2,796
  - Density: 101.3/sq mi (39.1/km^{2})
- Time zone: UTC-5 (Eastern (EST))
  - Summer (DST): UTC-4 (EDT)
- ZIP code(s): 48653 (Roscommon)
- Area code: 989
- FIPS code: 26-31960
- GNIS feature ID: 1626348
- Website: Official website

Gerrish Township Informational Site
- Interactive map of Gerrish Township; Informational Site
- 44°27′28″N 84°39′50″W
- Location: 2997 E. Higgins Lake Drive; Roscommon, Michigan

Michigan State Historic Site
- Designated: December 12, 1979

Gerrish Township is a civil township of Roscommon County in the U.S. state of Michigan. The population was 2,796 at the 2020 census.

== Communities ==
- Sharps Corner is an unincorporated community located near South Higgins Lake State Park along the township line with Markey Township at 44°25′16″N 84°41′01″W.

== Geography ==
According to the U.S. Census Bureau, the township has a total area of 37.23 square miles (96.43 km^{2}), of which 27.60 square miles (71.48 km^{2}) is land and 9.63 square miles (24.94 km^{2}) (25.87%) is water.

Gerrish Township has a long coastline and mostly surrounds Higgins Lake and the much smaller Marl Lake, as well as most of the boundaries of South Higgins Lake State Park. The Cut River begins at Higgins Lake within Gerrish Township and flows south through Markey Township to Houghton Lake.

== History ==
The location started as the Gerrish Logging Camp. On April 5, 1880, at the camp, area residents met and elected officers for their newly formed township. The first Township Supervisor was James Watson (1880, 1883-1889). The longest serving Township Supervisor was Wiley E. Sims (1901-1905, 1921-1928). As originally platted, the township included present-day Gerrish, Lyon, and Markey townships. In 1920, the boundary line was reestablished to its present lines. The second permanent town hall was built in 1970.

== Demographics ==
As of the census of 2000, there were 3,072 people, 1,343 households, and 957 families residing in the township. The population density was 111.2 inhabitants per square mile (42.9/km^{2}). There were 3,366 housing units at an average density of 121.8 per square mile (47.0/km^{2}). The racial makeup of the township was 98.24% White, 0.33% African American, 0.29% Native American, 0.16% Asian, 0.10% Pacific Islander, 0.16% from other races, and 0.72% from two or more races. Hispanic or Latino of any race were 0.62% of the population.

There were 1,343 households, out of which 22.7% had children under the age of 18 living with them, 63.7% were married couples living together, 5.4% had a female householder with no husband present, and 28.7% were non-families. 25.4% of all households were made up of individuals, and 12.6% had someone living alone who was 65 years of age or older. The average household size was 2.29 and the average family size was 2.71.

In the township the population was spread out, with 20.0% under the age of 18, 4.8% from 18 to 24, 19.7% from 25 to 44, 31.0% from 45 to 64, and 24.4% who were 65 years of age or older. The median age was 48 years. For every 100 females, there were 99.5 males. For every 100 females age 18 and over, there were 97.4 males.

The median income for a household in the township was $37,147, and the median income for a family was $46,469. Males had a median income of $41,542 versus $23,500 for females. The per capita income for the township was $19,877. About 5.1% of families and 6.8% of the population were below the poverty line, including 8.5% of those under age 18 and 5.4% of those age 65 or over.
