= Roscommon, Michigan =

- Village
- Village of Roscommon
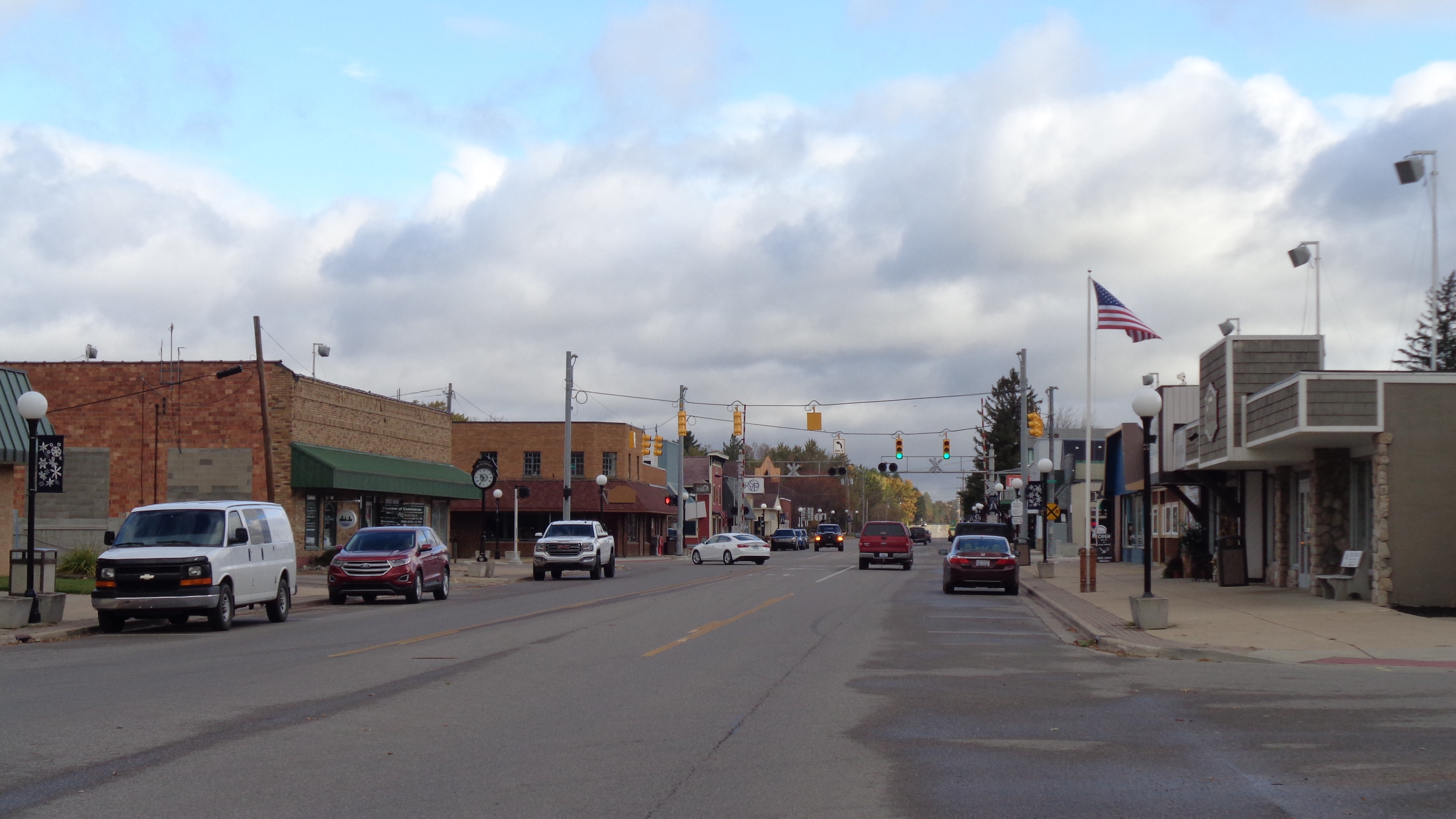
- Looking north along Lake Street (M-18)

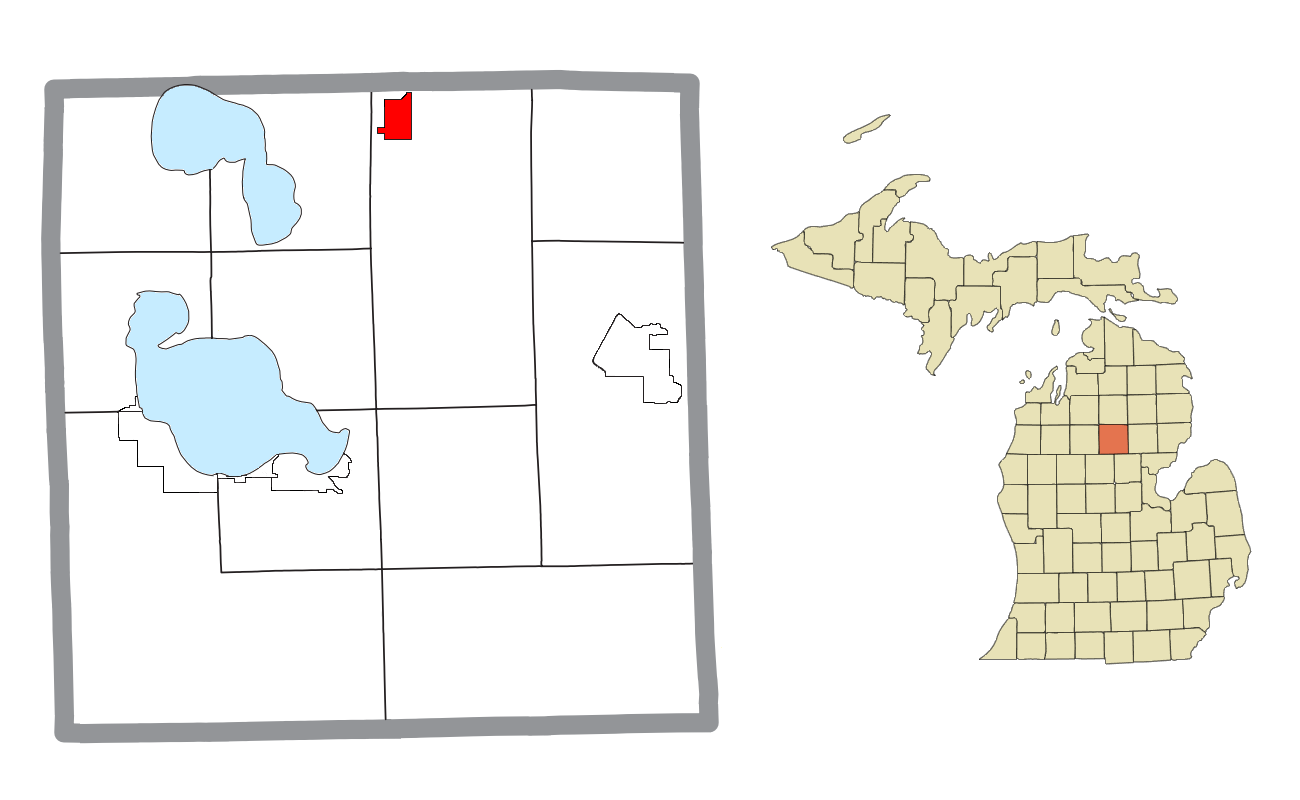
- Location within Roscommon County

- Location within the state of Michigan Location within the United States
- Coordinates: 44°29′54″N 84°35′31″W
- Country: United States
- State: Michigan
- County: Roscommon
- Township: Higgins
- Settled: 1845
- Incorporated: 1882

Government
  - Type: Village council
  - President: Mike Miller
  - Clerk: Frances Dawson

Area
  - Total: 1.66 sq mi (4.30 km^{2})
  - Land: 1.65 sq mi (4.27 km^{2})
  - Water: 0.012 sq mi (0.03 km^{2})
- Elevation: 1,135 ft (346 m)

Population (2020)
  - Total: 981
  - Density: 594.55/sq mi (229.56/km^{2})
- Time zone: UTC-5 (Eastern (EST))
  - Summer (DST): UTC-4 (EDT)
- ZIP code(s): 48653
- Area code: 989
- FIPS code: 26-69540
- GNIS feature ID: 1621434
- Website: Official website

Roscommon (/rɒsˈkɒmən/ ross-KOM-ən) is a village in and the county seat of Roscommon County, Michigan, United States. The population was 981 at the 2020 census.

== History ==
The community of Roscommon was first settled as early as 1845 by George Robinson of Detroit shortly after Roscommon County was organized in 1840. The community was named after the county, which itself was named after County Roscommon in Ireland. The Roscommon post office was established on January 9, 1873, with Alfred Bennett serving as the first postmaster. In 1875, Roscommon became the county seat and incorporated as a village in 1882.

Beginning in 1979, the annual Michigan's Firemen's Memorial Festival is held in Roscommon and commemorates firefighters who died while protecting their communities.

== Geography ==
According to the U.S. Census Bureau, the village has a total area of 1.66 square miles (4.30 km^{2}), of which 1.65 square miles (4.27 km^{2}) is land and 0.01 square miles (0.03 km^{2}) (0.60%) is water.

Roscommon is within close proximity of three state parks: South Higgins Lake State Park, North Higgins Lake State Park, and Hartwick Pines State Park. A 160-acre (65 ha) parcel within the Au Sable State Forest, referred to as the Roscommon Red Pines, is 8 miles (13 km) east of Roscommon. It is an old-growth stand of red pines. The South Branch of the Au Sable River passes through the village and is a popular destination for kayaking, canoeing, and fishing.

The village of Roscommon is located within Higgins Township in the northern portion of the county. Roscommon has its own post office with the 48653 ZIP Code, which also serves all of Gerrish Township, most of Lyon Township, and smaller areas extending into Lake Township, Markey Township, and Au Sable Township. It also serves portions of South Branch Township and Beaver Creek Township to the north in Crawford County.

=== Major highways ===
- I-75 passes about 2.0 miles (3.2 km) south of the village and is accessible via exit 239 (M-18, also known as North Roscommon Road at this point).
- BL I-75 runs concurrent with M-18 from exit 239.
- M-18 (Lake Street) runs through the center of the village.

== Climate ==
According to the Köppen Climate Classification system, has a warm-summer humid continental climate, abbreviated "Dfb" on climate maps. The hottest temperature recorded in Roscommon was 103 °F (39.4 °C) on June 19, 1995, while the coldest temperature recorded was −34 °F (−36.7 °C) on February 17, 1979.

Climate data for Roscommon, Michigan (Houghton Lake State Airport), 1991–2020 normals, extremes 1964–present
Month	Jan	Feb	Mar	Apr	May	Jun	Jul	Aug	Sep	Oct	Nov	Dec	Year
Record high °F (°C)	54 (12)	59 (15)	85 (29)	86 (30)	91 (33)	103 (39)	98 (37)	96 (36)	92 (33)	85 (29)	73 (23)	64 (18)	103 (39)
Mean maximum °F (°C)	44.5 (6.9)	47.0 (8.3)	61.7 (16.5)	74.7 (23.7)	84.4 (29.1)	89.6 (32.0)	90.1 (32.3)	88.6 (31.4)	84.8 (29.3)	75.5 (24.2)	60.1 (15.6)	48.0 (8.9)	92.1 (33.4)
Mean daily maximum °F (°C)	26.9 (−2.8)	29.6 (−1.3)	40.4 (4.7)	53.8 (12.1)	67.2 (19.6)	76.7 (24.8)	80.5 (26.9)	78.3 (25.7)	70.6 (21.4)	56.8 (13.8)	43.1 (6.2)	32.1 (0.1)	54.7 (12.6)
Daily mean °F (°C)	19.1 (−7.2)	20.3 (−6.5)	29.7 (−1.3)	42.2 (5.7)	54.7 (12.6)	63.9 (17.7)	67.8 (19.9)	65.8 (18.8)	58.3 (14.6)	46.8 (8.2)	35.5 (1.9)	25.6 (−3.6)	44.1 (6.7)
Mean daily minimum °F (°C)	11.4 (−11.4)	11.0 (−11.7)	19.1 (−7.2)	30.7 (−0.7)	42.3 (5.7)	51.1 (10.6)	55.0 (12.8)	53.3 (11.8)	46.1 (7.8)	36.8 (2.7)	27.9 (−2.3)	19.0 (−7.2)	33.6 (0.9)
Mean minimum °F (°C)	−11.2 (−24.0)	−12.0 (−24.4)	−4.8 (−20.4)	16.4 (−8.7)	28.0 (−2.2)	36.8 (2.7)	41.8 (5.4)	39.1 (3.9)	30.4 (−0.9)	22.9 (−5.1)	12.9 (−10.6)	−0.1 (−17.8)	−16.4 (−26.9)
Record low °F (°C)	−26 (−32)	−34 (−37)	−24 (−31)	2 (−17)	21 (−6)	29 (−2)	33 (1)	29 (−2)	21 (−6)	16 (−9)	−5 (−21)	−21 (−29)	−34 (−37)
Average precipitation inches (mm)	1.70 (43)	1.41 (36)	1.78 (45)	3.10 (79)	3.15 (80)	3.22 (82)	2.74 (70)	2.86 (73)	2.59 (66)	3.08 (78)	2.20 (56)	1.76 (45)	29.59 (753)
Average snowfall inches (cm)	16.4 (42)	13.6 (35)	8.3 (21)	4.4 (11)	0.1 (0.25)	0.0 (0.0)	0.0 (0.0)	0.0 (0.0)	0.0 (0.0)	0.5 (1.3)	7.5 (19)	15.1 (38)	65.9 (167.55)
Average extreme snow depth inches (cm)	11.2 (28)	13.6 (35)	11.8 (30)	2.8 (7.1)	0.1 (0.25)	0.0 (0.0)	0.0 (0.0)	0.0 (0.0)	0.0 (0.0)	0.1 (0.25)	3.7 (9.4)	7.7 (20)	15.3 (39)
Average precipitation days (≥ 0.01 in)	14.0	11.4	10.5	12.0	11.7	10.9	10.0	9.5	10.9	13.5	13.2	13.5	141.1
Average snowy days (≥ 0.1 in)	12.8	10.6	5.9	2.9	0.1	0.0	0.0	0.0	0.0	0.3	5.8	10.6	49.0
Source 1: NOAA
Source 2: National Weather Service

== Demographics ==
Historical population
Census	Pop.	Note	%±
1890	511		—
1900	465		−9.0%
1910	425		−8.6%
1920	357		−16.0%
1930	412		15.4%
1940	619		50.2%
1950	877		41.7%
1960	867		−1.1%
1970	810		−6.6%
1980	834		3.0%
1990	858		2.9%
2000	1,133		32.1%
2010	1,075		−5.1%
2020	981		−8.7%
U.S. Decennial Census

=== 2010 census ===
As of the census of 2010, there were 1,075 people, 423 households, and 233 families living in the village. The population density was 721.5 inhabitants per square mile (278.6/km^{2}). There were 507 housing units at an average density of 340.3 per square mile (131.4/km^{2}). The racial makeup of the village was 95.6% White, 0.3% African American, 0.7% Native American, 0.8% Asian, and 2.6% from two or more races. Hispanic or Latino of any race were 0.2% of the population.

There were 423 households, of which 29.8% had children under the age of 18 living with them, 31.4% were married couples living together, 16.3% had a female householder with no husband present, 7.3% had a male householder with no wife present, and 44.9% were non-families. 42.8% of all households were made up of individuals, and 18.5% had someone living alone who was 65 years of age or older. The average household size was 2.13 and the average family size was 2.88.

The median age in the village was 43.6 years. 22.1% of residents were under the age of 18; 8.1% were between the ages of 18 and 24; 21.4% were from 25 to 44; 25.4% were from 45 to 64; and 22.9% were 65 years of age or older. The gender makeup of the village was 47.8% male and 52.2% female.

=== 2000 census ===
As of the census of 2000, there were 1,133 people, 436 households, and 235 families living in the village. The population density was 695.1 inhabitants per square mile (268.4/km^{2}). There were 491 housing units at an average density of 301.2 per square mile (116.3/km^{2}). The racial makeup of the village was 96.03% White, 1.24% African American, 0.79% Native American, 0.44% Asian, and 1.50% from two or more races. Hispanic or Latino of any race were 0.18% of the population.

There were 436 households, out of which 28.9% had children under the age of 18 living with them, 36.2% were married couples living together, 14.7% had a female householder with no husband present, and 45.9% were non-families. 40.8% of all households were made up of individuals, and 19.3% had someone living alone who was 65 years of age or older. The average household size was 2.19 and the average family size was 3.01.

In the village, the population was spread out, with 22.9% under the age of 18, 10.3% from 18 to 24, 24.4% from 25 to 44, 19.3% from 45 to 64, and 23.1% who were 65 years of age or older. The median age was 39 years. For every 100 females, there were 85.7 males. For every 100 females age 18 and over, there were 80.6 males.

The median income for a household in the village was $28,229, and the median income for a family was $33,929. Males had a median income of $29,844 versus $18,875 for females. The per capita income for the village was $14,746. About 19.3% of families and 21.2% of the population were below the poverty line, including 34.4% of those under age 18 and 8.5% of those age 65 or over.

== Education ==
The village of Roscommon is served by Roscommon Area Public Schools, which has a single main campus located just to the west of the village in Gerrish Township.

== Notable people ==
- Ralph Ostling, politician who served in the Michigan House of Representatives

== Images ==
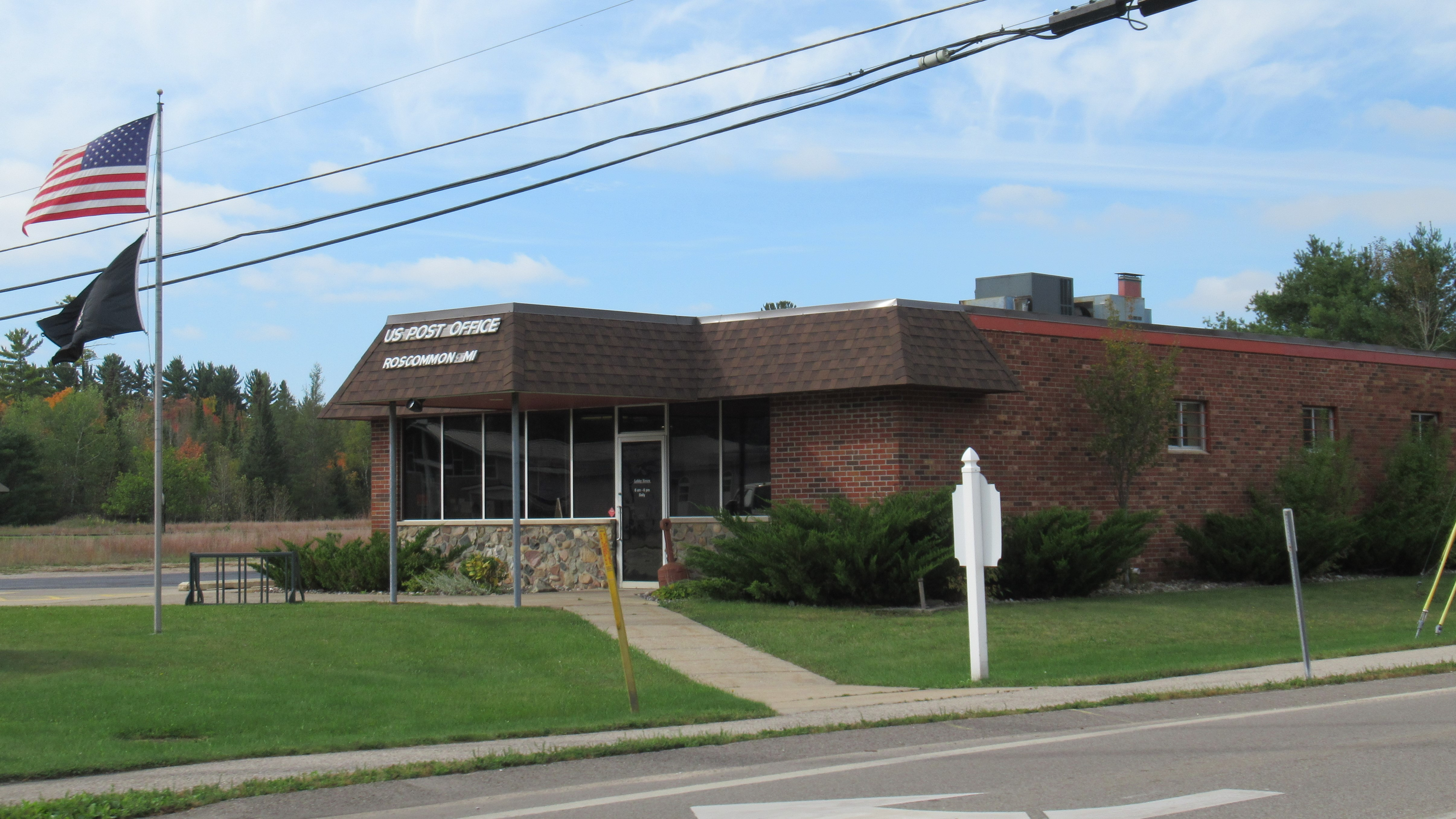
U.S. Post Office in Roscommon

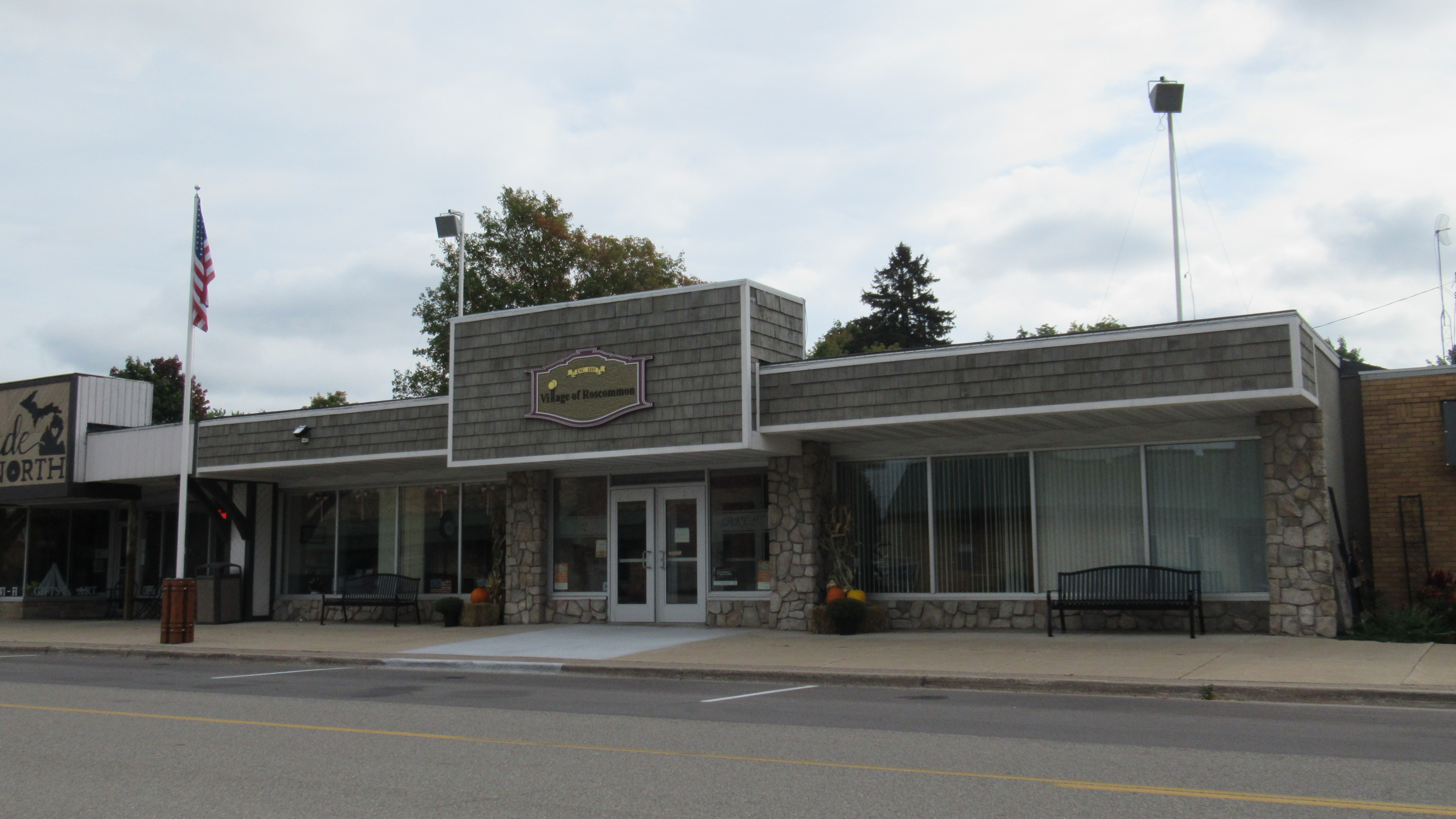
Roscommon village office

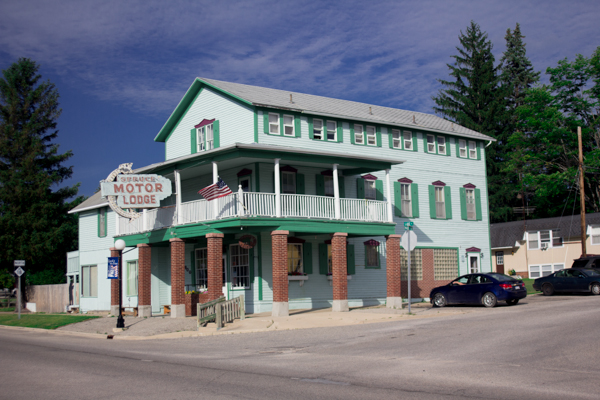
The historic Pioneer House
