= Higgins Lake =

Lake in Michigan, United States

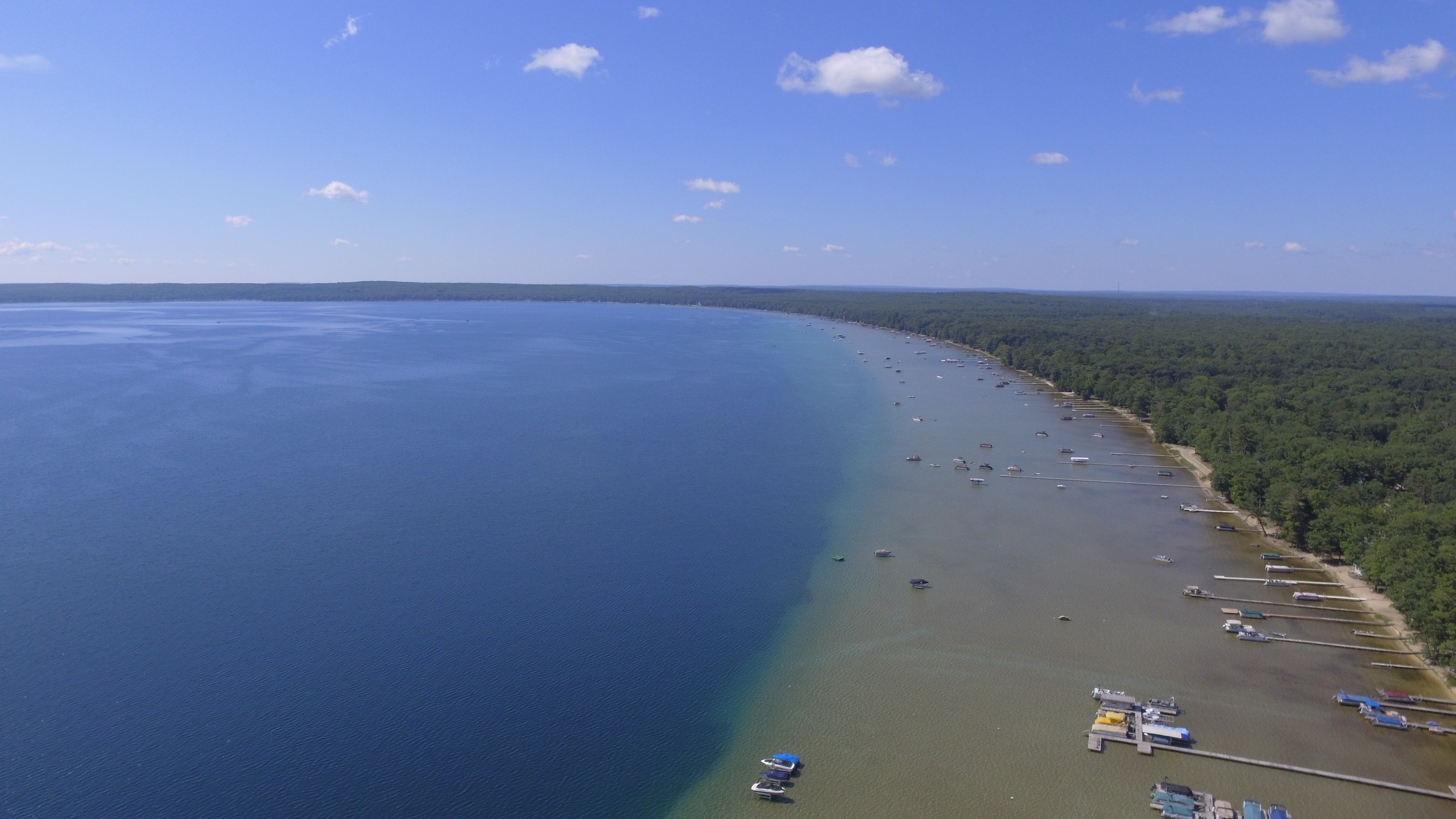
- Aerial view of the lake's north shore

- Location within the state of Michigan Higgins Lake (the United States)
- Location: Roscommon County, Michigan
- Coordinates: 44°28′56″N 84°42′31″W
- Type: Glacial Lake
- Primary inflows: Springs, precipitation, streams, Big Creek
- Primary outflows: Cut River to Marl Lake
- Catchment area: 19,000 acres (7,700 ha)
- Basin countries: United States
- Max. length: 7 mi (11 km)
- Max. width: 4 mi (6.4 km)
- Surface area: 9,600 acres (3,900 ha)
- Average depth: 44 ft (13 m)
- Max. depth: 135 ft (41 m)
- Water volume: almost 20×10^{9} cu ft (0.57 km^{3})
- Residence time: 12.5 years
- Shore length^{1}: 21 mi (34 km)
- Surface elevation: 1,155 feet (352 m)
- Islands: 1
- ^{1} Shore length is not a well-defined measure.

Higgins Lake is a large recreational and fishing lake in Roscommon County, in the U.S. state of Michigan. The 9,900 acres (4,000 ha) lake is known for its deep, clear waters and is the 10th largest in Michigan with a shoreline of 21 miles (34 km). It is named after Sylvester Higgins, the first chief of the topographical department of the Michigan Geological Survey. It has a maximum width of 4 miles (6.4 km) and a length of 7 miles (11 km) with a maximum depth of 135 feet (41 m). The mean depth is 30.4 feet (9.3 m) and the lake contains almost 20 billion cubic feet (570×10^{6} m^{3}) of water. Its retention time is about 12.5 years. The lake's watershed covers 19,000 acres (7,700 ha). The twin-lobed lake receives half of its water from submerged springs, six percent from incoming streams, and the remainder from direct rainfall and runoff. It drains into Marl Lake by the Cut River which runs into Houghton Lake and eventually to Lake Michigan via the Muskegon River. A mile north of the lake, water flows into the Lake Huron watershed.

Sportfish in the lake include yellow perch, trout, smelt and pike. Fish are taken both in open water and by ice fishing. Higgins Lake is considered a morphometrically oligotrophic lake, meaning that its large size causes it to appear and function as a nutrient-poor lake although it receives a fair amount of nutrients.

The unincorporated community of Higgins Lake is located along the western shores of the lake, and the lake is situated on the boundary between Lyon Township on the west and Gerrish Township on the east.

There are two state parks, located on opposite ends of the lake: South Higgins Lake State Park, which has a mile of shoreline, and North Higgins Lake State Park. Both provide public boat launches and camping, and are very popular in the summer months. The south park is older, larger, and more developed. The north park is located on what was once the world's largest seedling nursery, a part of the Civilian Conservation Corps of the 1930s and early 1940s.

Centuries before European settlers came to North America, the Chippewa (Ojibwe) people called the lake Majinabeesh, from maaji ("start") and nibiish ("waters"), meaning 'start of the waters'. This lake was one of many created by glaciers shifting across Northern Michigan. When the glaciers dug into the soil around 12,000 years ago, they uncovered the natural springs that feed Higgins Lake. Since these springs are consistently flowing, there must be a way to manage this constant feeding of water. That is where the dam comes into play. This dam flows at 44.2 cubic feet per second and helps keep the water level steady. The watershed as of 2020 is 35.7% open water. The rest is 38.3% forest, 10.1% urban, 7.9% wetland, 5.3% grassland, 2.5% other, and 0.1% agricultural.

== History ==
The Chippewa people named the lake Majinabeesh, but it was later renamed by Europeans to Forginson Lake from an early 1839 survey by John Brink and it was renamed again to Higgins Lake to honor the surveyor Higgins in the 1852 survey by William A. Burt. The reason the lake became so popularized in the first place was the source of water and amount of logging jobs available.

== Environmental concerns ==
In recent years, the lake has become increasingly popular as a residential and recreational area, which has raised concern for the lake's water quality. Citizens and local government believe the lake suffers harm from increased loads of nutrients, including phosphorus and nitrogen, from septic systems, fertilizers, and runoff from roads.

The most obvious change has been the introduction of zebra mussels. Zebra mussels, which have no known predators in U.S. waters, threaten the existence of native clams and result in more vegetation growing on the bottom of the lake.

Residents at Higgins Lake have begun actively lobbying for laws to enforce cleaning of boats before they can be put into the lake, as well as programs to try to combat other foreign pests and intruders to preserve the lake's natural ecology.

== Gallery ==
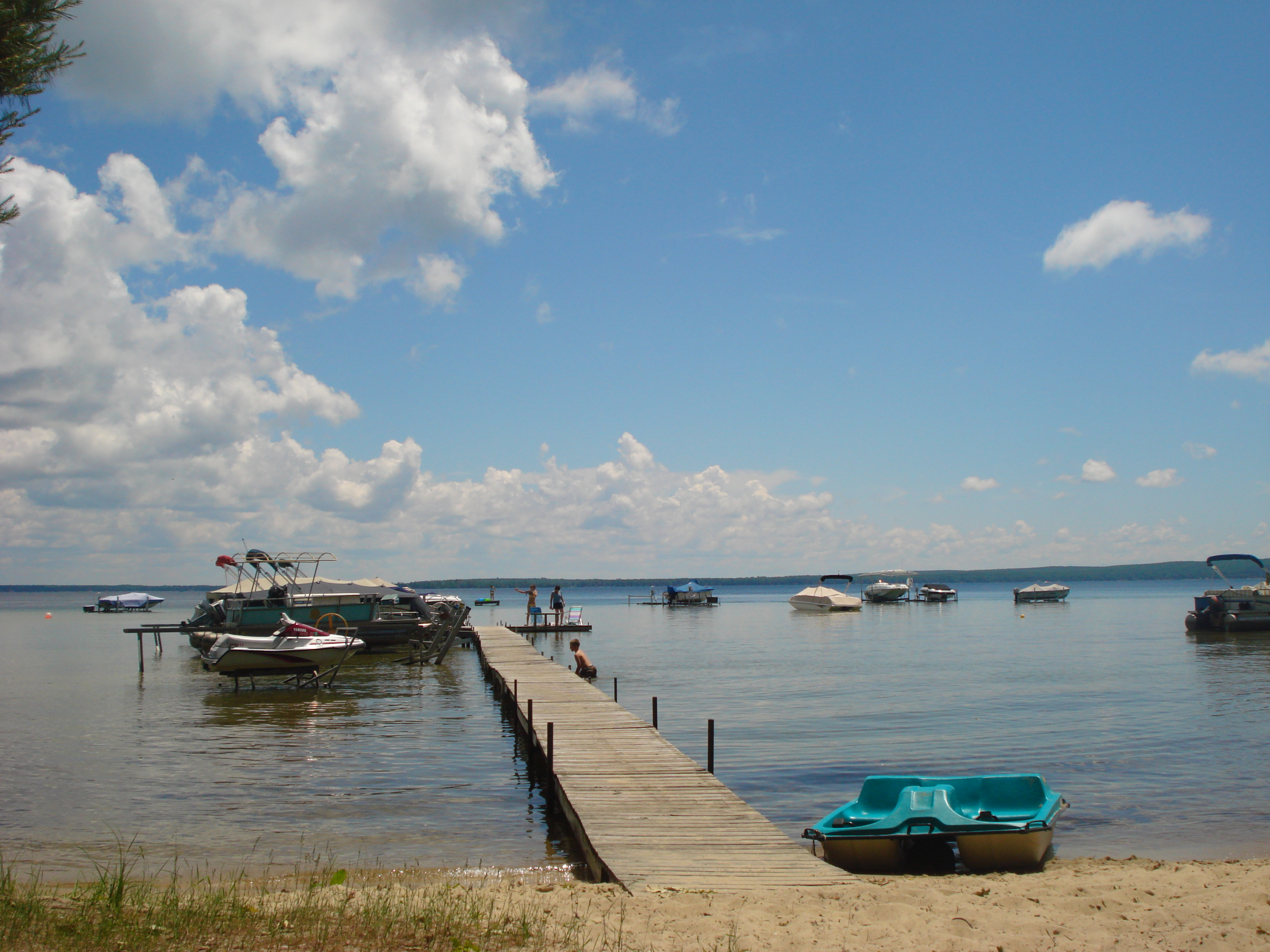
St. Johns American Legion Beach

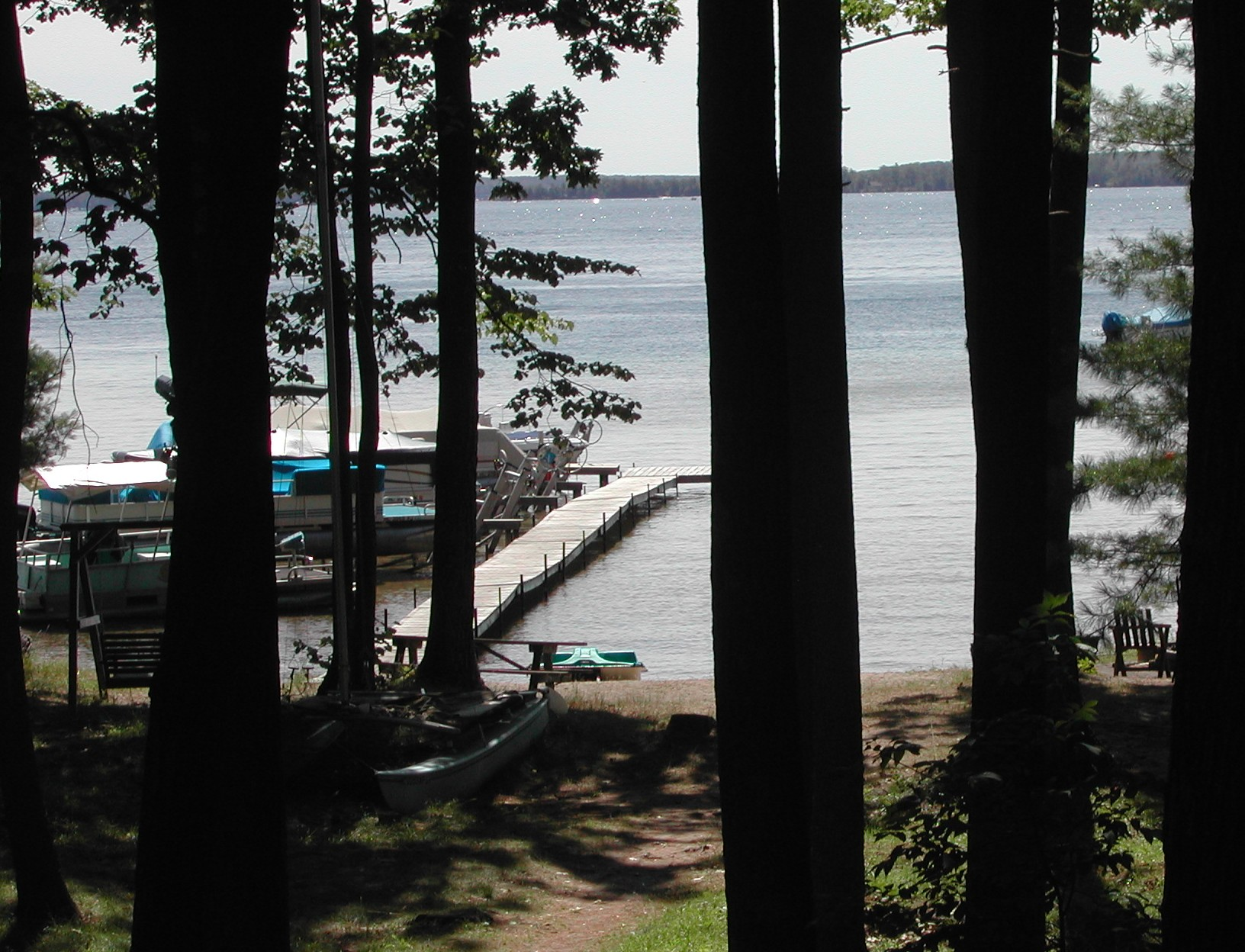
North Higgins Lake

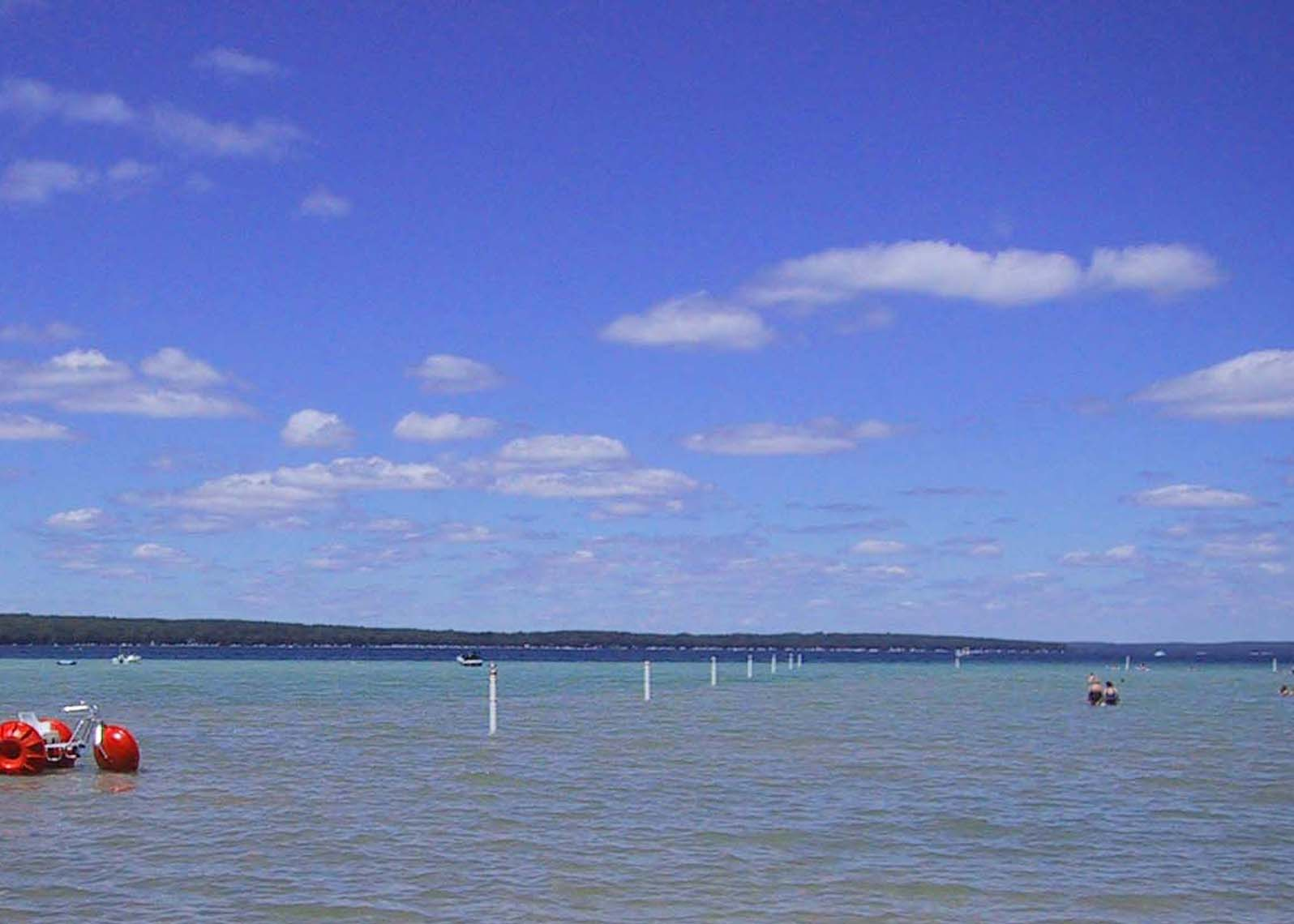
South Higgins Lake State Park

== See also ==
- List of lakes in Michigan
