= North Higgins Lake State Park =

Park in Michigan, United States

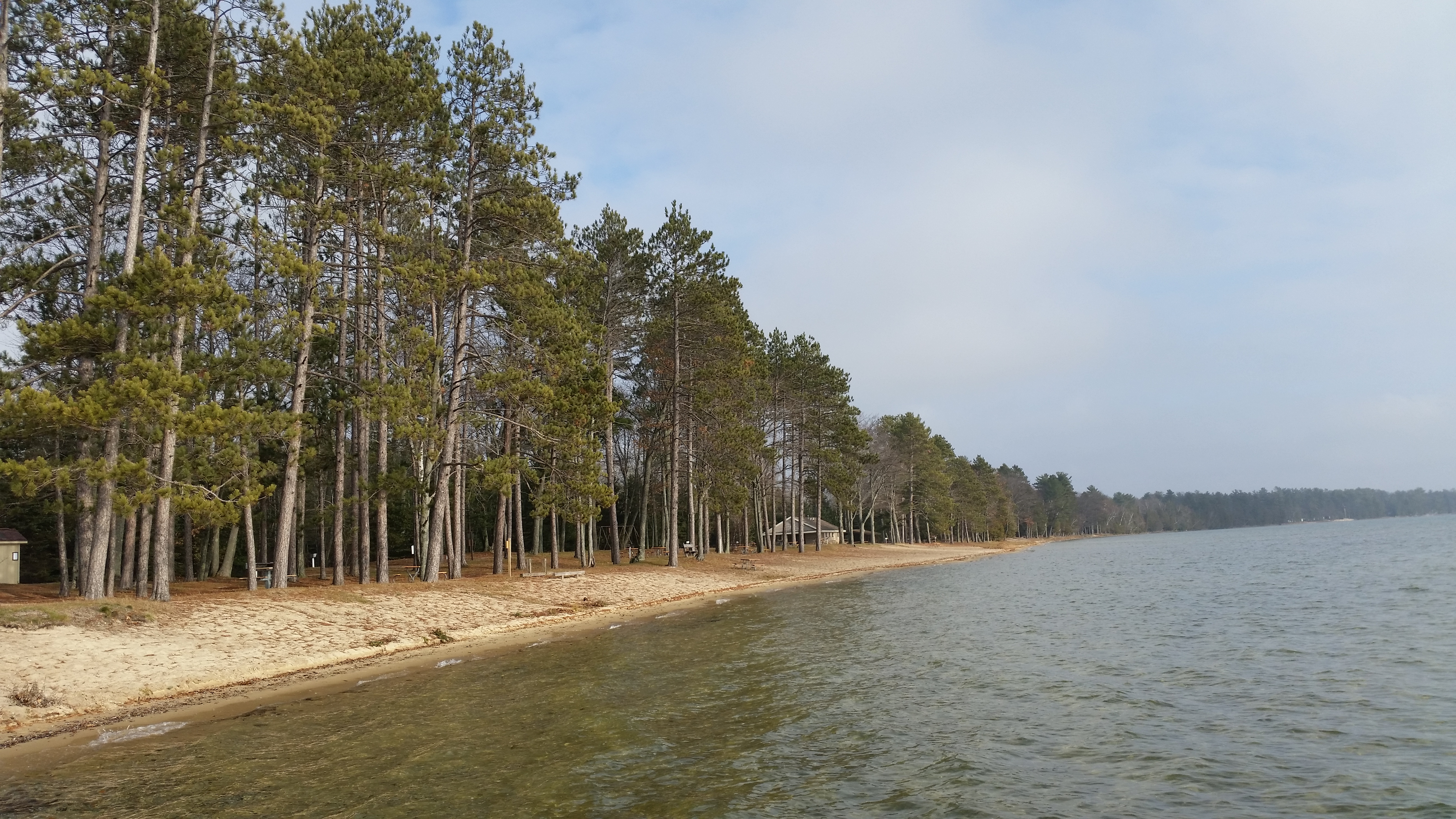
- Beachfront along Higgins Lake

- Location within Michigan Location within the United States
- Location: Lower Peninsula, Crawford County, Michigan, United States
- Nearest city: Roscommon, Michigan
- Coordinates: 44°30′50″N 84°45′28″W
- Area: 449 acres (182 ha)
- Elevation: 1,165 feet (355 m)
- Established: 1965
- Administrator: Michigan Department of Natural Resources
- Designation: Michigan state park
- Website: Official website

North Higgins Lake State Park is a public recreation area located nine miles (14 km) west of Roscommon in Beaver Creek Township, Crawford County, Michigan. The state park occupies 449 acres (182 ha) on the north shore of Higgins Lake at the site of what was once one of the world's largest seedling nurseries.

== Features ==
=== Higgins Lake Nursery and CCC Museum ===
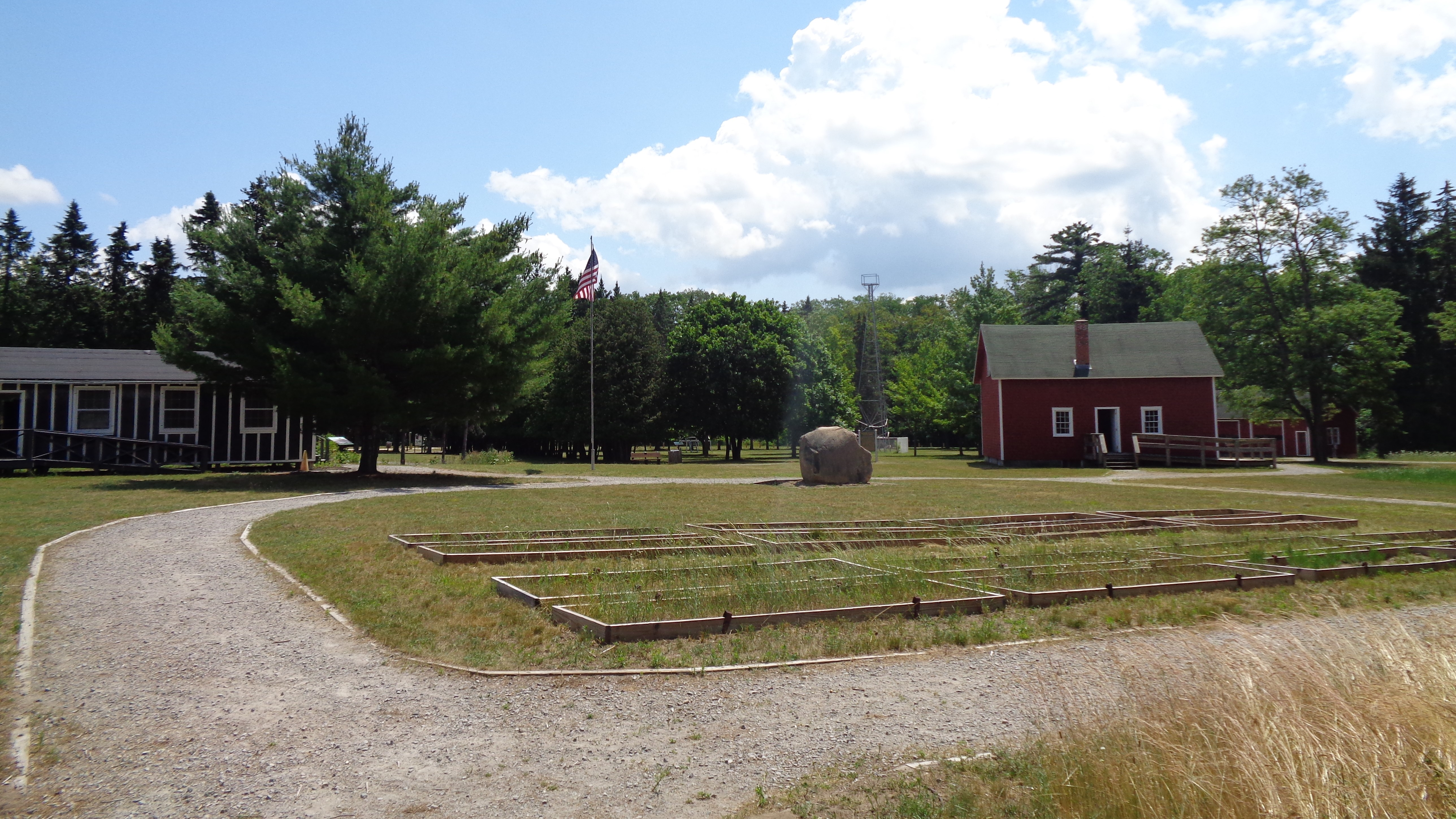
Civilian Conservation Corps Museum

The Higgins Lake Nursery and CCC Museum documents the role of the Civilian Conservation Corps in Michigan from 1933 to 1942 when more than 100,000 young Michigan men performed a variety of conservation and reforestation efforts. Exhibits tell the story of how the Michigan CCC planted 484 million trees, spent 140,000 days fighting forest fires and constructed 7,000 miles of truck trails, 504 bridges and 222 buildings. The Michigan state park system carries many examples of their work still in use today, including the MacMullan Conference Center.

=== Ralph A. MacMullan Conference Center ===
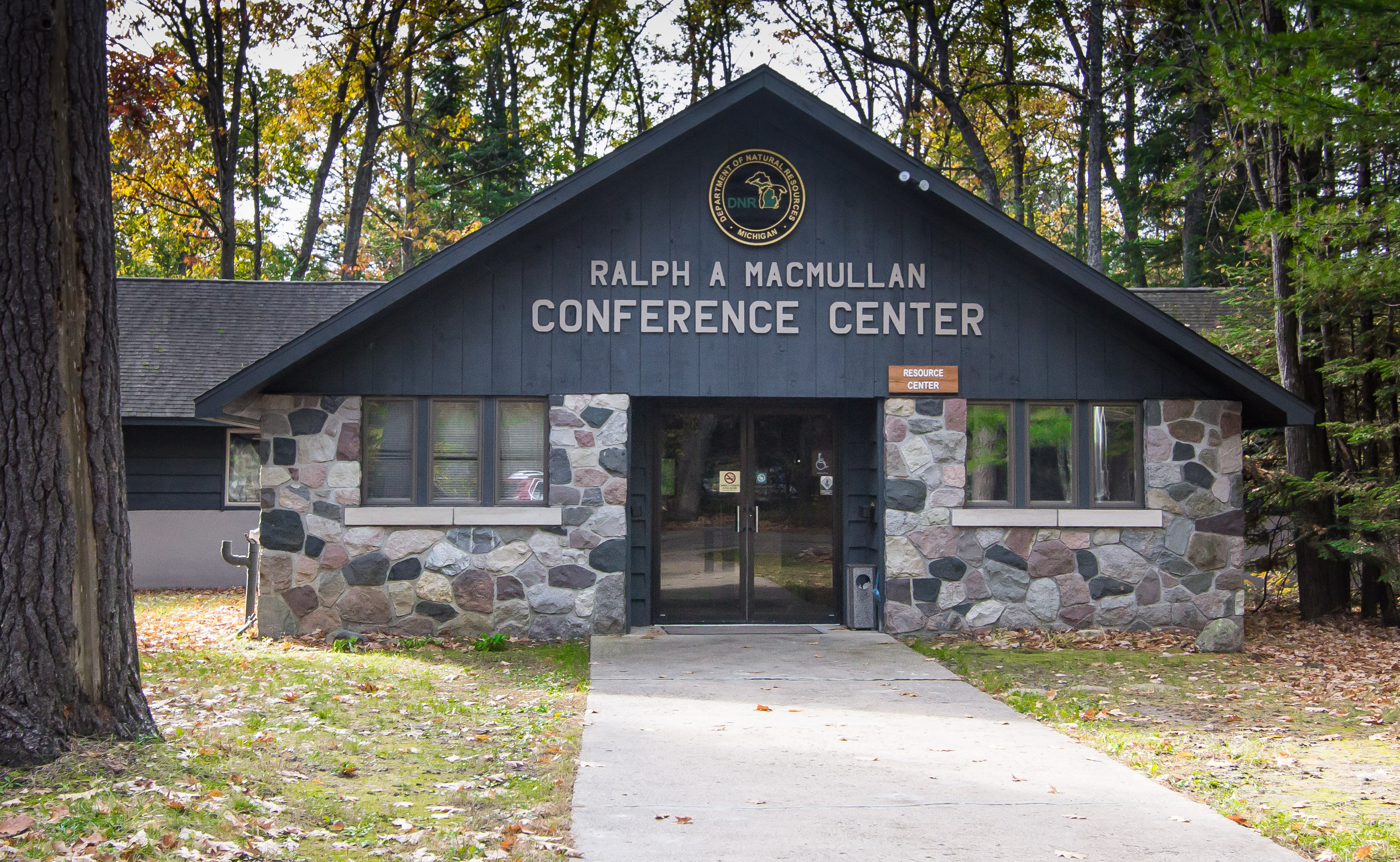
Ralph A. MacMullen Conference Center

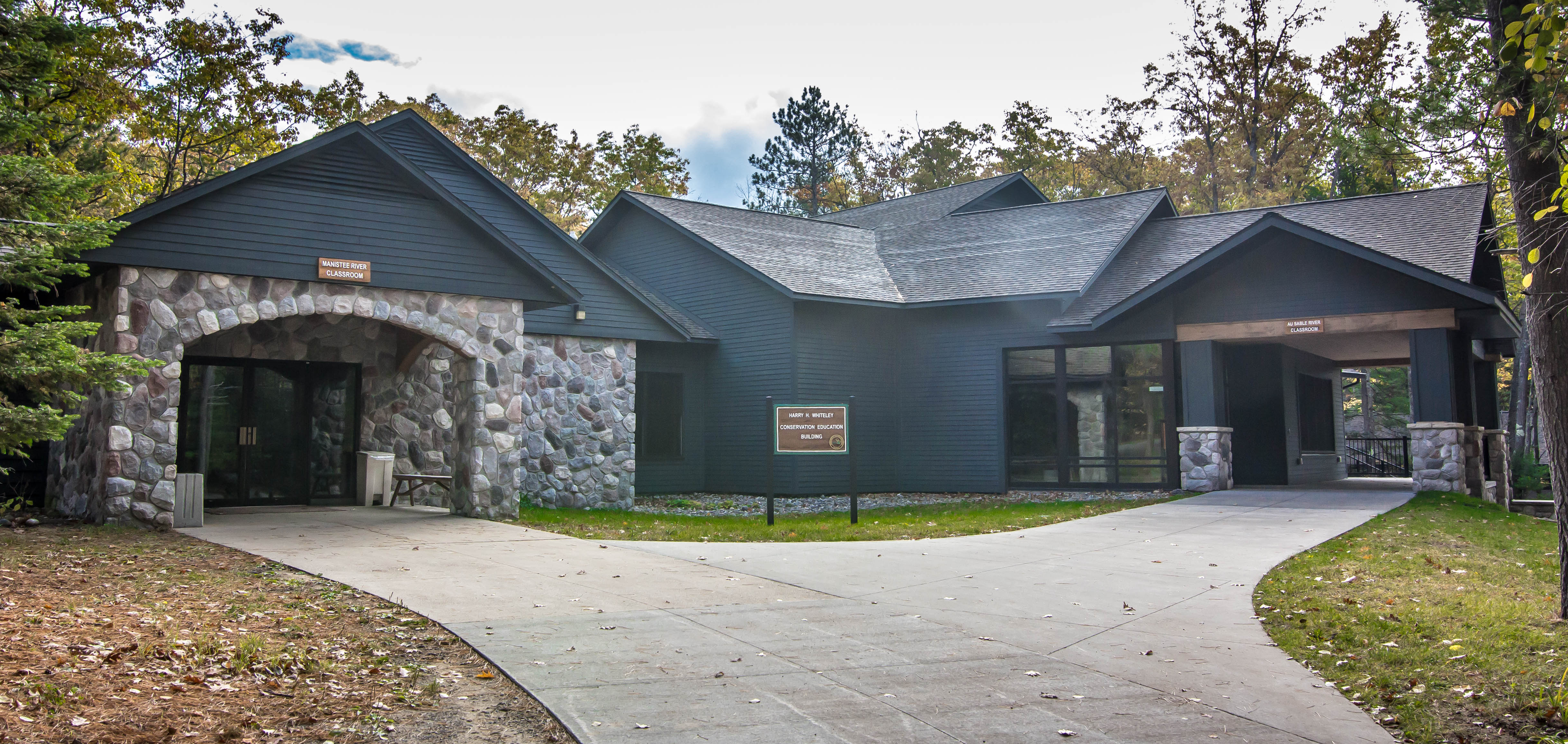
Harry Whiteley Conference Center

The Ralph A. MacMullen Conference Center Scenic Site (RAM Center) is a lodge and free-standing facility in the park. Originally built by the Civilian Conservation Corps in a rustic style with a fieldstone exterior, it serves as a 135-seat retreat center for nonprofit and public sector groups. It is located on the northern shores of Higgins Lake, northeast of the village of Roscommon between U.S. Highway 127 and Interstate 75.

== Activities and amenities ==
Park activities include camping, swimming, fishing, picnicking, and boating. There are eleven miles of trails for hiking and cross-country skiing through state forest land adjacent to the park.
