= Houghton Lake =

Houghton Lake may refer to:

== Michigan ==
- Houghton Lake (Michigan), located in Roscommon County; state's largest inland lake
- Houghton Lake, Michigan, an unincorporated community and census-designated place
  - Houghton Lake Heights, Michigan, an unincorporated community
  - Houghton Lake State Airport, an airport within Houghton Lake Heights
- Houghton Lake Flats Flooding State Wildlife Management Area, a protected area in Roscommon County
- Houghton Lake (Ogemaw County, Michigan), a small lake in Ogemaw County

== Other ==
- Houghton Lake, (Indiana), a small lake in Marshall County, Indiana
- Houghton Lake (Saskatchewan), a lake in the Lenore Lake (Saskatchewan) basin
- Lake Houghton (glacial) was a precursor of Lake Huron

== See also ==
- Houghton, Michigan
