= Houghton Lake State Airport =

Public use airport in Roscommon County, Michigan

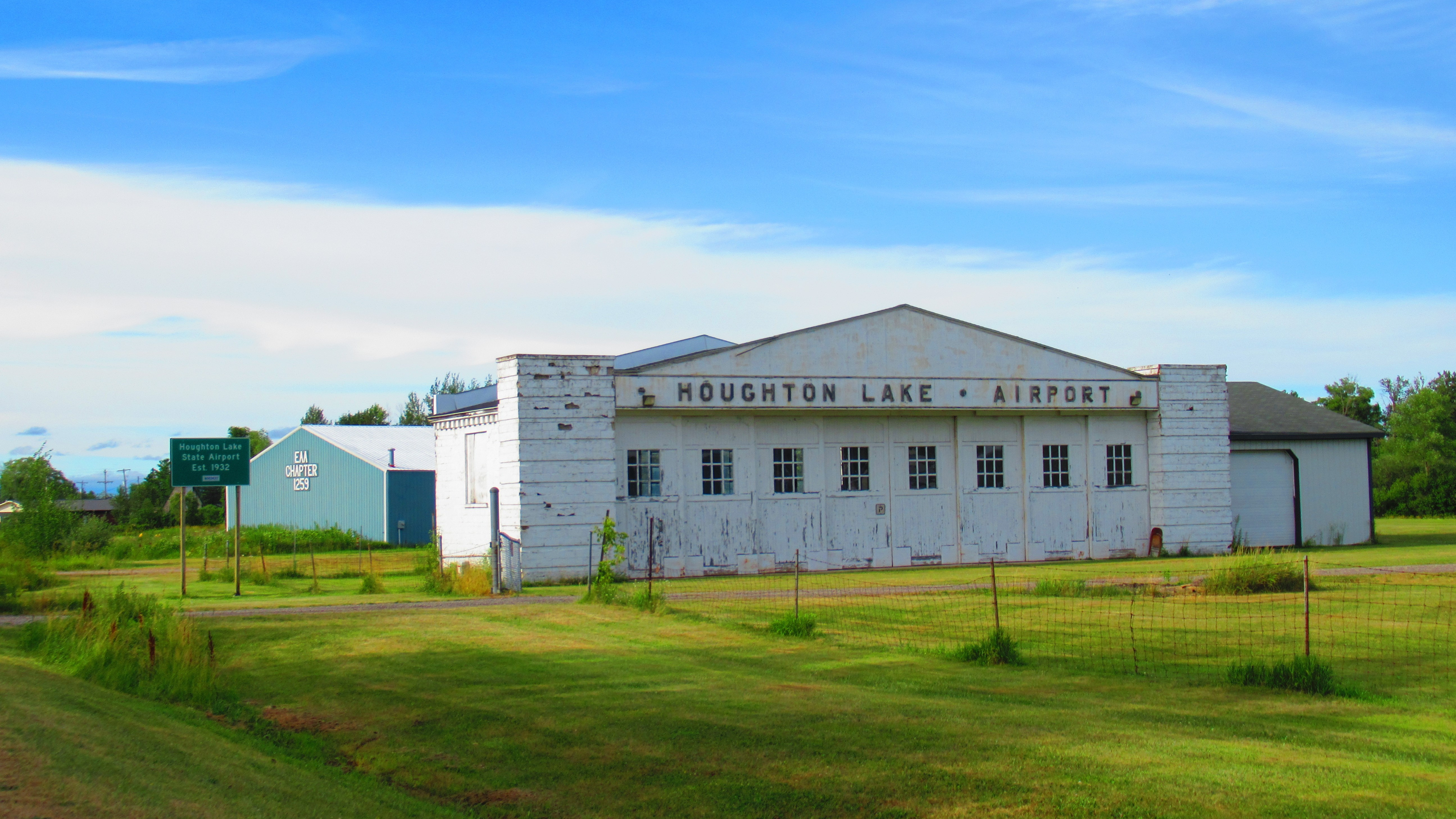
- Airport hangar along Old U.S. Highway 27
- IATA: none; ICAO: 5Y2; FAA LID: 5Y2

Summary
- Airport type: Public
- Owner: Michigan Department of Transportation
- Operator: Minneapolis ARTCC
- Location: Houghton Lake Heights; Roscommon Township, Michigan
- Opened: 1932
- Time zone: UTC−05:00 (-5)
  - Summer (DST): UTC−04:00 (-4)
- Elevation AMSL: 1,165 ft / 355 m
- Coordinates: 44°19′58″N 84°47′35″W

Maps
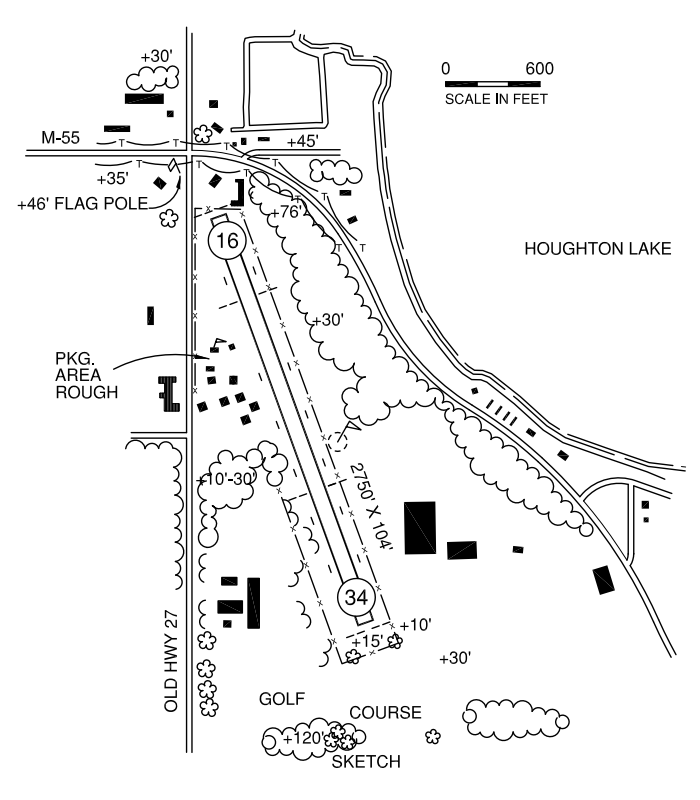
- Diagram of Houghton Lake State Airport

- Location of airport in Michigan 5Y2 (the United States)

Runways
Direction	Length		Surface
Direction	ft	m	Surface
16L/34L	2,750	104	Turf

Statistics (2019)
- Aircraft operations: 396
- Based aircraft: 9
- Source: Aircraft Owners and Pilots Association

Houghton Lake Airport (ICAO: 5Y2, FAA LID: 5Y2), known formally as Houghton Lake State Airport, is a state-owned public airport located in Roscommon County in the U.S. state of Michigan. It is in the community of Houghton Lake Heights within Roscommon Township. The airport is named after the nearby Houghton Lake just east of the airport, and it is also included within the census-designated place of Houghton Lake.

The airport was first constructed in 1932 and publicly activated in April 1940. The facility is located near the intersection of M-55 (West Houghton Lake Drive) and Old U.S. Highway 27 about 0.5 miles (0.8 km) east of U.S. Highway 127. It is a publicly owned airport supported through tax dollars, and the airport is maintained by the Michigan Department of Transportation.

The airport is home to a chapter of the Experimental Aircraft Association, which hosts events such as regular lunch fly-ins.

== Facilities and aircraft ==
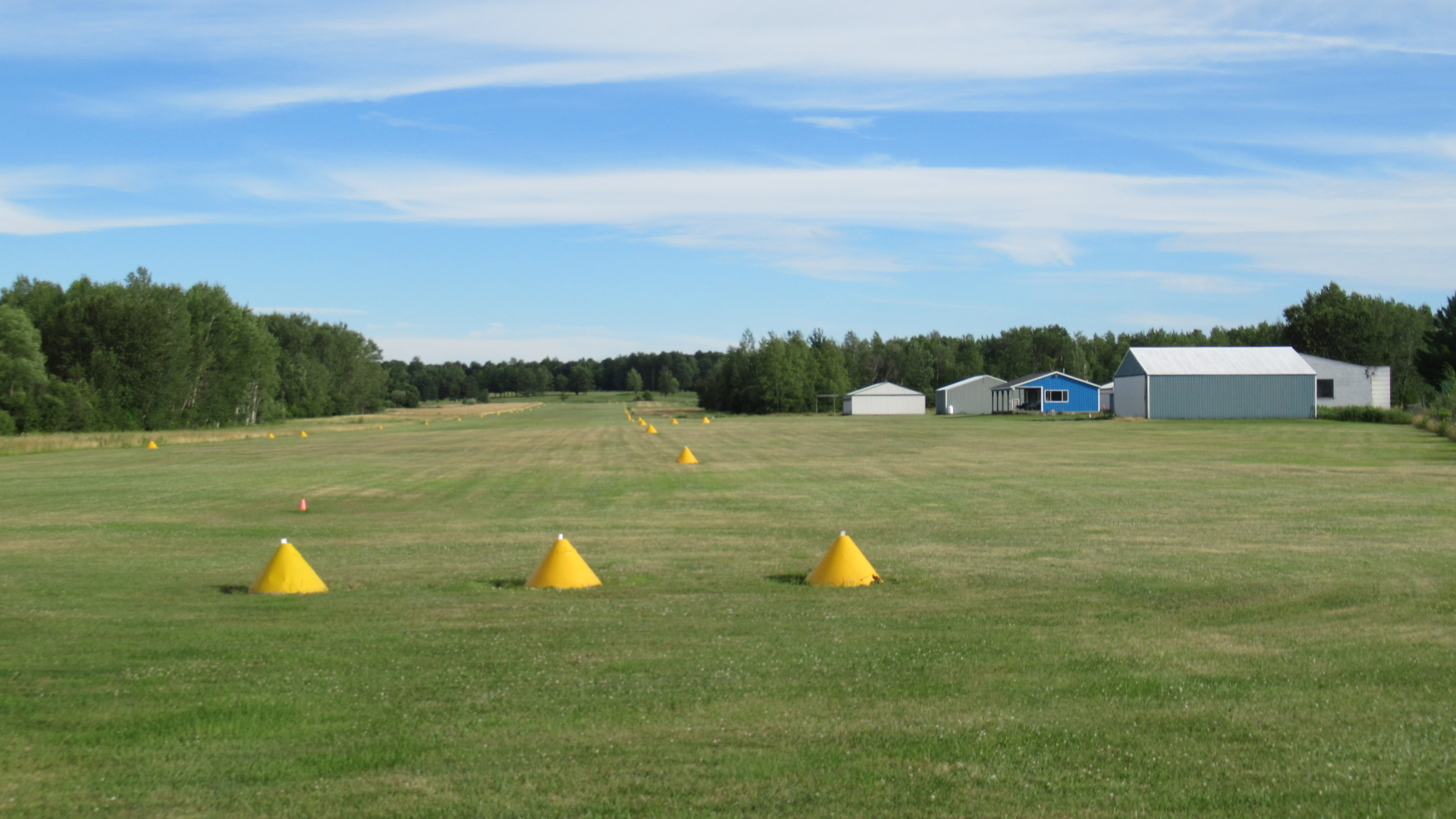
Looking south along the airport runways

The airport sits at an elevation of 1,165 feet (355 m) above sea level and occupies an area of 161 acres (65 ha).

The airport has one runway, designated as runway 16/34. It measures 2,750 by 104 feet (838 by 32 m) and is made of grass with no lighting. The airport has no regularly scheduled flights or arrivals. As a general aviation airport, it is mainly used by private pilots for personal use, and the runways can only accommodate smaller planes. The complex contains a hangar and several smaller buildings, but it has no control tower or permanent staffing. Instrument traffic is handled through the Minneapolis Air Route Traffic Control Center (ZMP) and the Lansing flight service station.

For the 12-month period ending December 31, 2019, the airport had 396 aircraft operations, an average of 33 per month. It was all general aviation. For the same time period, 9 aircraft were based at the airport, all single-engine airplanes.

In 2019, the airport raised over $1,300 through fundraising to restore the airport's historic hangar.

== Nearby airports ==
Houghton Lake State Airport is one of two public-use airports in Roscommon County. Roscommon County–Blodgett Memorial Airport is a larger facility located about 6 nautical miles (11 km; 6.9 mi) east in Markey Township. Other nearby public airports include Grayling Army Airfield 21 nautical miles (39 km; 24 mi) north, Gladwin Zettel Memorial Airport 25 nautical miles (46 km; 29 mi) southeast, West Branch Community Airport 27 nautical miles (50 km; 31 mi) east, and Wexford County Airport 27 nautical miles (50 km; 31 mi) west.

The Cherry Capital Airport in Traverse City is the nearest primary airport offering commercial services. It is located 38 nautical miles (70 km; 44 mi) to the northwest.

== Accidents and incidents ==
- On July 2, 2016, a single-engine Piper aircraft with four people aboard crashed while landing at Houghton Lake State Airport for a fly-in. All aboard were uninjured. One person onboard said the plane came in too slow and nosed over just before touchdown.
- On July 8, 2018 a Best Off Skyranger experimental light-sport airplane, N4329R, made a forced landing shortly after takeoff from Houghton Lake State Airport. According to the pilot, he did not observe any anomalies with the airplane or its engine during his preflight inspection and the fuel tank contained about 12 gallons of automotive fuel before the flight. The pilot did not observe any anomalies during his before-takeoff engine runup. The pilot reported that the takeoff roll, rotation, and initial climb from runway 16 was uneventful; however, as the airplane climbed through 150 ft above ground level the engine speed rapidly decreased from 6,200 rpm to 4,700 rpm. Despite the pilot's corrective actions, the engine continued to operate at a decreased power setting and the airplane was unable to maintain altitude. The pilot reported that there were trees ahead of the airplane's flight path, so he made a turn into the wind and maneuvered to land on a nearby golf course fairway. The pilot stated that the airplane had insufficient altitude and airspeed to flare normally, which resulted in a hard landing on the fairway.

== See also ==
- List of airports in Michigan
