= Houghton Lake Flats Flooding State Wildlife Management Area =

Protected area in Michigan, United States

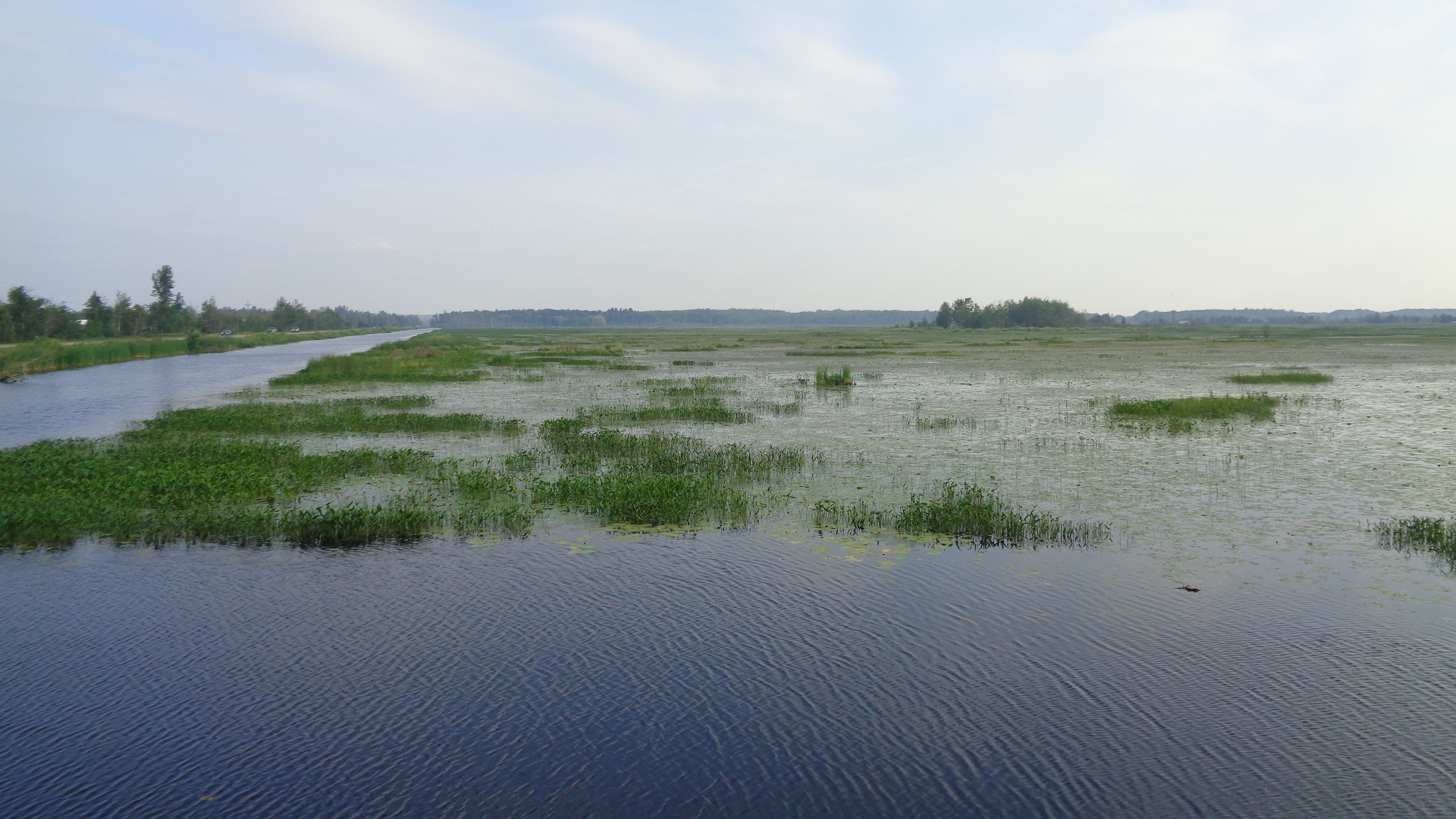
- Looking south from the observation deck

- Location within Michigan Location within the United States
- Location: Lake Township, Roscommon County, Michigan
- Nearest city: Grayling, Michigan
- Coordinates: 44°22′18″N 84°48′29″W
- Area: 1,830 acres (7.4 km^{2})
- Elevation: 1,142 feet (348 m)
- Governing body: Michigan Department of Natural Resources

The Houghton Lake Flats Flooding State Wildlife Management Area is a protected wildlife area located in rural Lake Township within Roscommon County in the U.S. state of Michigan. The wildlife management area incorporates 1,830 acres (7.41 km^{2}) of artificially restored marsh and wetlands just west of Houghton Lake.

== Description ==
The wildlife management area is controlled and maintained by the Michigan Department of Natural Resources. The area's headquarters are located at the Houghton Lake Wildlife Research office on 180 South Harrison Road (Old U.S. Highway 27) just south of West Lake City Road (M-55) in Roscommon Township. The Houghton Lake Flats Flooding State Wildlife Management Area is bisected north–south by U.S. Route 127. The area is bordered on the east by West Houghton Lake Drive (Old U.S. Highway 27), on the north by Mead Road, and on the northwest by West Higgins Lake Road. Yeager Road (County Road 300) bisects the area in half east–west and crosses over U.S. Highway 127 (US 127). No other roads run through the area. While the area's boundaries do not border Houghton Lake or the Muskegon River, the area receives water from both sources.

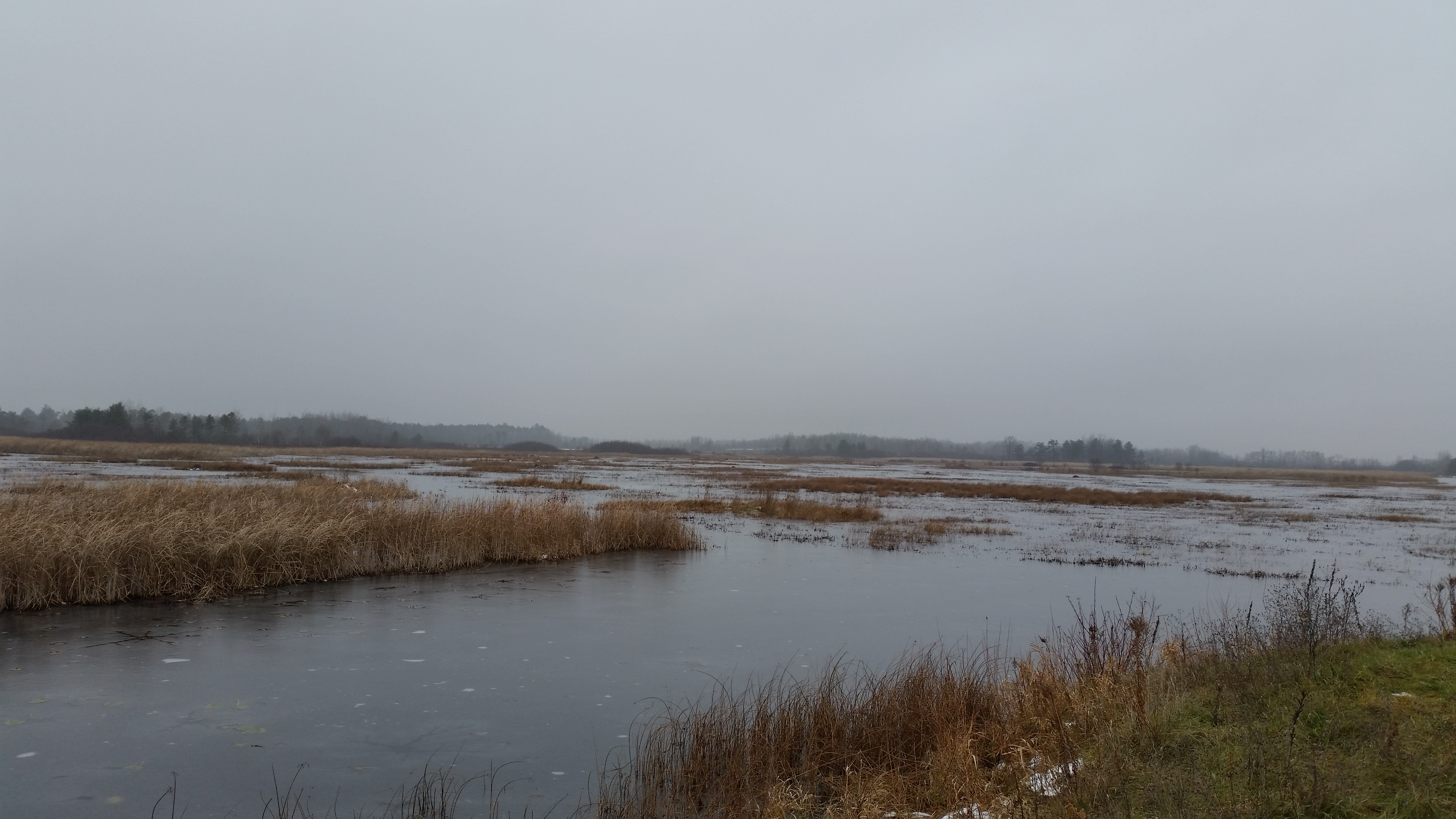
Looking north from the observation platform in November 2016

The wildlife management area is divided into two sections. The area north of Yeager Road is referred to as the Houghton Lake Flats North Flooding State Wildlife Management Area at 838 acres (339 ha). The area south of Yeager Road is referred to as the Houghton Lake Flats South Flooding State Wildlife Management Area at 992 acres (401 ha). The entire wildlife management area occupies 1,830 acres (740 ha). The wildlife management area itself is mostly accessible from US 127 exit 194 (M-55) or exit 201 (Pine Road) north in Lyon Township nearer Higgins Lake. Nearby sizable communities include Houghton Lake and Prudenville to the southeast, Lake City about 23 miles (37 km) west, and Grayling about 22 miles (35 km) north.

The Houghton Lake Flats Flooding State Wildlife Management Area is just east of the Dead Stream Flooding State Wildlife Management Area and slightly north of the Houghton Lake State Wildlife Research Area.

== Activities ==
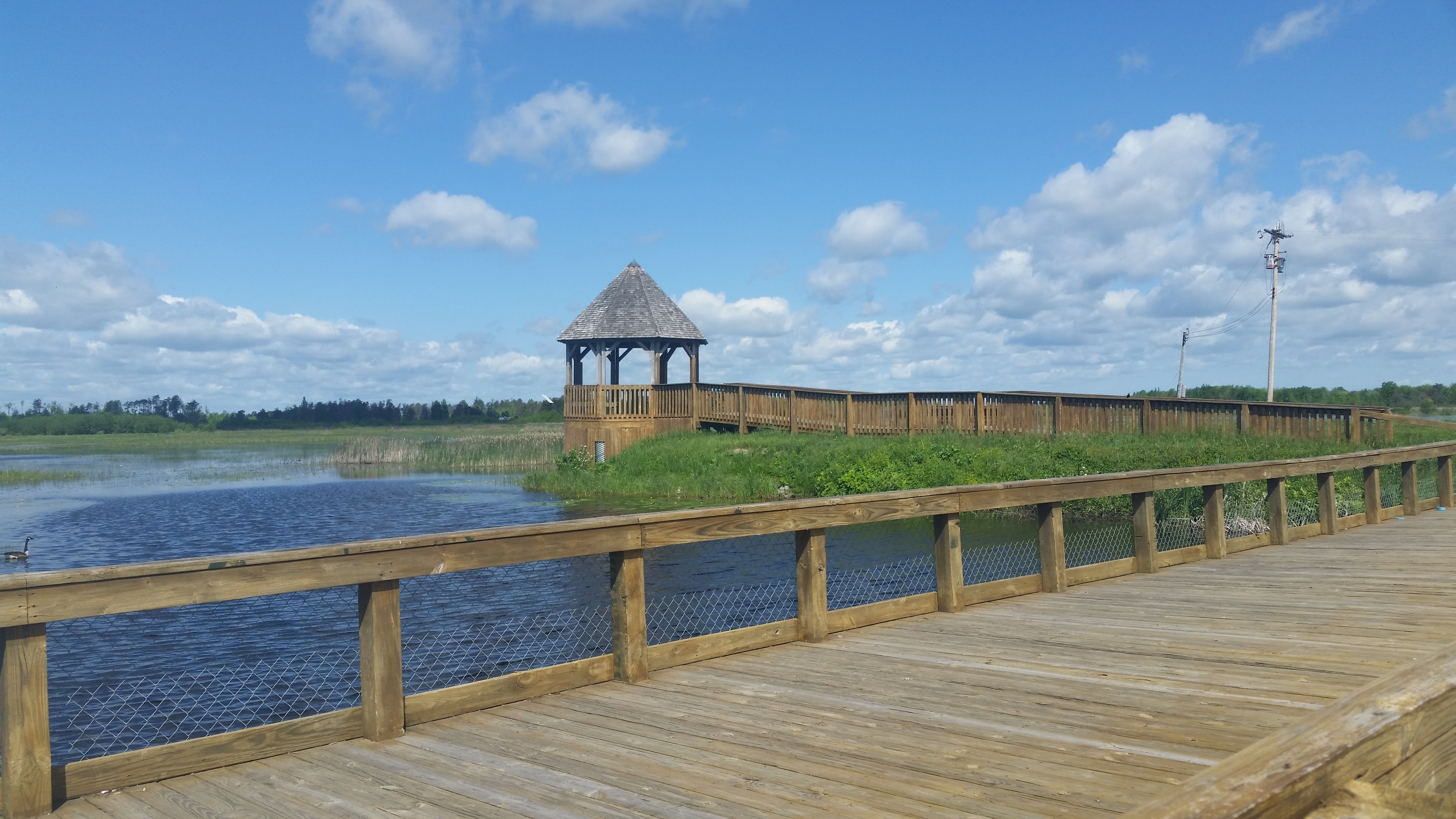
Houghton Lake Flats Observation Deck in May 2016

The wildlife management area is a popular birdwatching destination along the AuSable Birding Trail. The Houghton Lake Flats Observation Deck was constructed in 1998 along Old U.S. Highway 27 just south of Yeager Road (44°21′47.7″N 84°48′00.6″W). Extending out into the marsh, the platform provides a panoramic viewing area of the flats looking toward US 127. The observation deck contains a small parking lot and boardwalk, as well as informational markers describing the wildlife management area and identifying several species of observable animals.

Some common bird species seen in the marshland include varieties of dabbling ducks, ospreys, great blue herons, egrets, and bald eagles. At least 165 different species of birds can be found living or breeding within the wildlife management area. The fairly rare Kirtland's warbler can also be found in the area. Other common animals include muskrats, raccoons, minks, and river otters. Turtles are common, including the eastern box and midland painted turtle. Hunting is allowed within the wildlife management area. Fishing is also permitted.
