= Lake Township, Roscommon County, Michigan =

Lake Township, Michigan
- Civil township
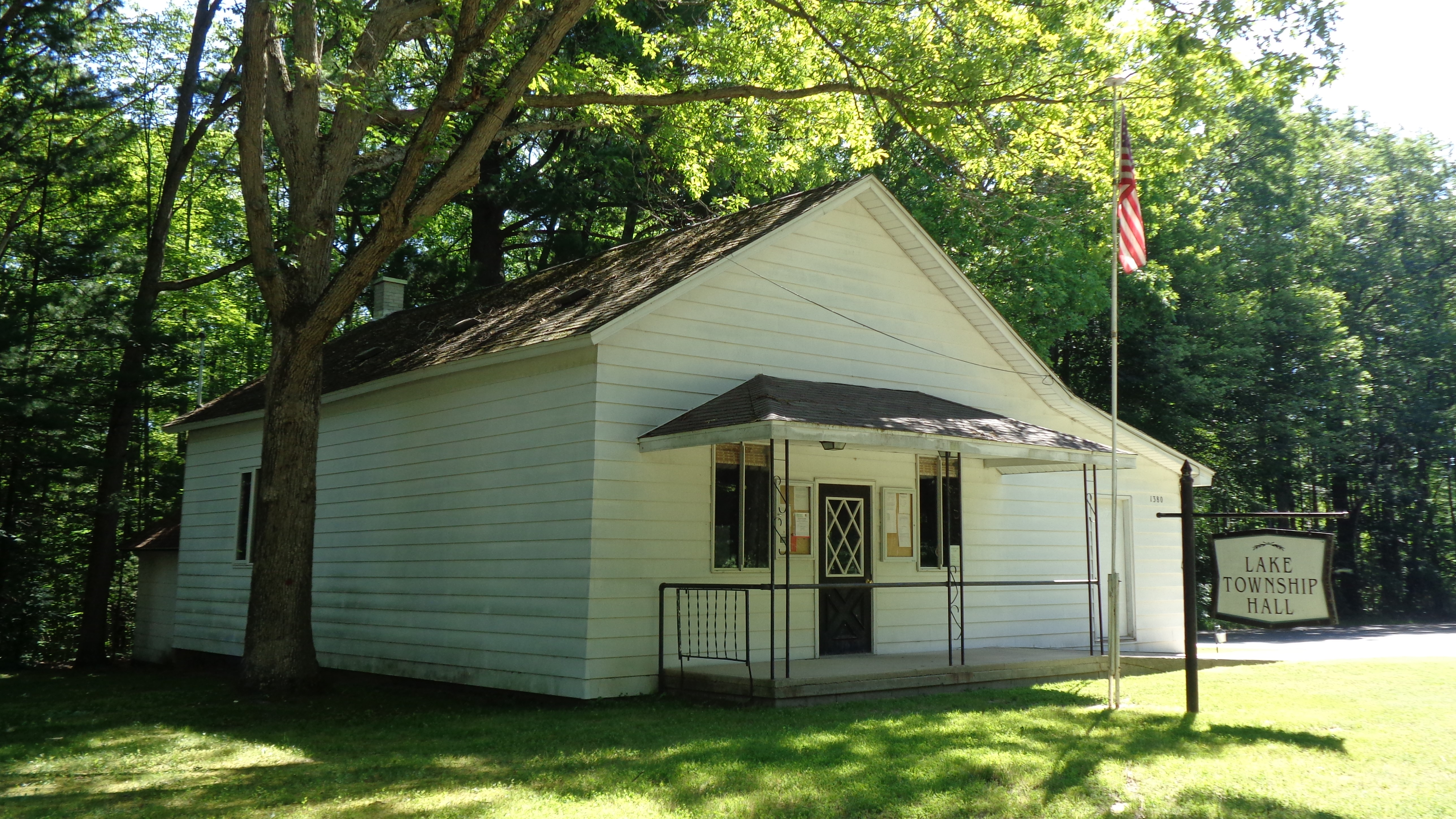
- Lake Township Hall

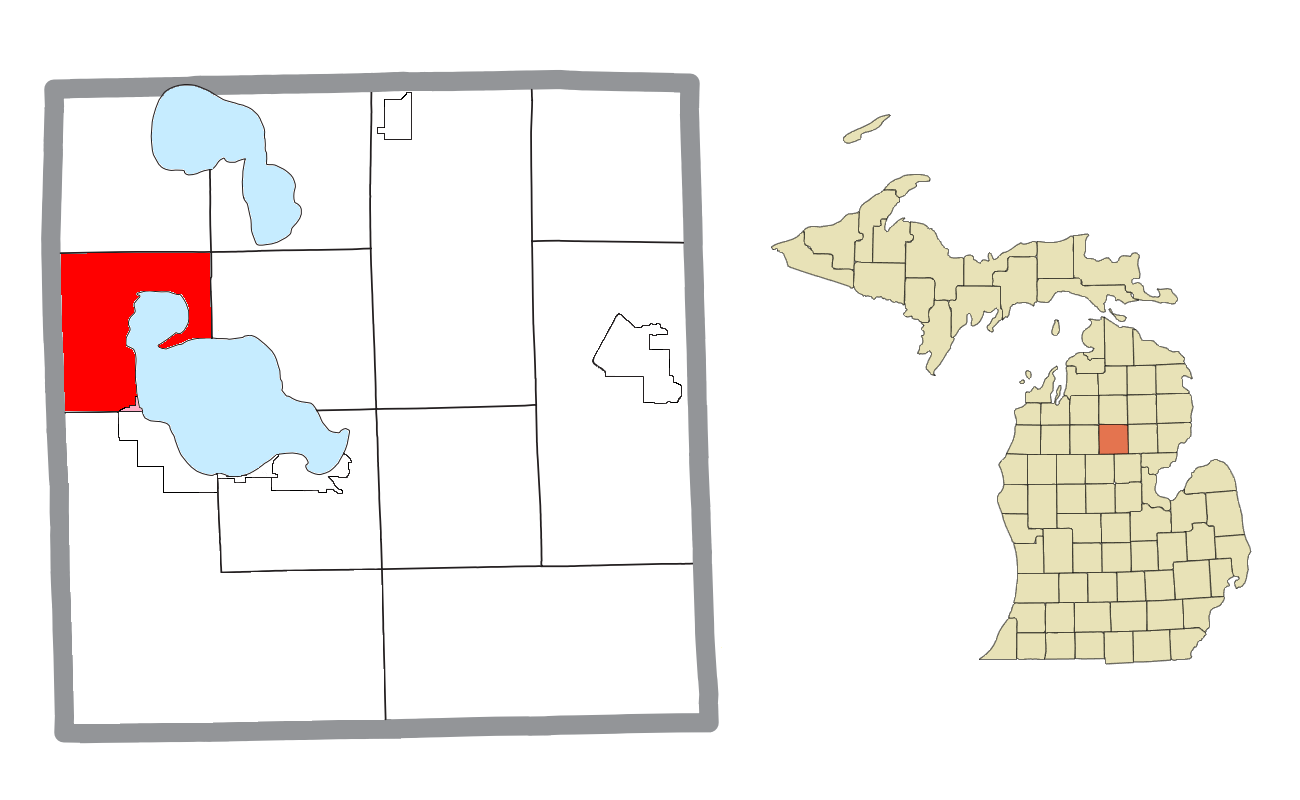
- Location within Roscommon County (red) and an administered portion of the Houghton Lake CDP (pink)

- Location within the state of Michigan Lake Township (the United States)
- Coordinates: 44°22′42″N 84°47′55″W
- Country: United States
- State: Michigan
- County: Roscommon

Government
  - Supervisor: Keith Stiles
  - Clerk: Pam Surprenant

Area
  - Total: 35.41 sq mi (91.7 km^{2})
  - Land: 23.06 sq mi (59.7 km^{2})
  - Water: 12.35 sq mi (32.0 km^{2})
- Elevation: 1,142 ft (348 m)

Population (2020)
  - Total: 1,119
  - Density: 48.5/sq mi (18.7/km^{2})
- Time zone: UTC-5 (Eastern (EST))
  - Summer (DST): UTC-4 (EDT)
- ZIP code(s): 48629 (Houghton Lake); 49667 (Merritt)
- Area code: 989
- FIPS code: 26-44400
- GNIS feature ID: 1626578
- Website: Official website

Lake Township is a civil township of Roscommon County in the U.S. state of Michigan. The population was 1,119 at the 2020 census.

== Communities ==
- Houghton Lake is a census-designated place at 44°18′53″N 84°45′53″W along the southwest side of Houghton Lake. The CDP also extends into Roscommon Township and Denton Township.
- Houghton Point is an unincorporated community within the township at 44°22′20″N 84°45′33″W. Houghton Point was settled along the northern shores of Houghton Lake in 1945. A post office opened on November 1, 1949 but is no longer in operation.
- Meads Landing is an unincorporated community in the northern portion of the township along the Muskegon River at 44°24′24″N 84°48′17″W.
- Michelson is an unincorporated community in the western portion of the township along the Dead Stream Flooding at 44°22′44″N 84°50′34″W. Michelson began as a railway station in 1904 along the Grand Rapids and Indiana Railroad. The community formed around a shingle mill and sawmill. A post office opened on June 1, 1909 but is no longer in operation.
- Nellsville is an unincorporated community on the southern border of the township at 44°20′09″N 84°48′48″W. The community is centered along M-55, which forms the boundary with Roscommon Township, and is just west of U.S. Route 127. The community was founded in 1906 and named after Roscommon Township supervisor Edward Nelson. A post office operated in Nellsville from August 20, 1906 until 1927.

== Geography ==
According to the U.S. Census Bureau, the township has a total area of 35.41 square miles (91.71 km^{2}), of which 23.06 square miles (59.73 km^{2}) is land and 12.35 square miles (31.99 km^{2}) (34.88%) is water.

The township surrounds the northwestern portion of Houghton Lake, and the western section of the township contains the Houghton Lake Flats Flooding State Wildlife Management Area and a portion of the Dead Stream Flooding State Wildlife Management Area. A small portion of the Houghton Lake community extends into Lake Township. The Houghton Lake 48629 ZIP Code serves the majority of the township, except a very small portion of the western edge served by the Merritt 49667 ZIP Code.

== Demographics ==
As of the census of 2000, there were 1,351 people, 671 households, and 436 families residing in the township. The population density was 56.8 inhabitants per square mile (21.9/km^{2}). There were 1,669 housing units at an average density of 70.1 per square mile (27.1/km^{2}). The racial makeup of the township was 98.00% White, 0.30% African American, 0.81% Native American, 0.22% Asian, 0.07% from other races, and 0.59% from two or more races. Hispanic or Latino of any race were 0.52% of the population.

There were 671 households, out of which 12.4% had children under the age of 18 living with them, 56.9% were married couples living together, 5.8% had a female householder with no husband present, and 34.9% were non-families. 30.7% of all households were made up of individuals, and 16.5% had someone living alone who was 65 years of age or older. The average household size was 2.00 and the average family size was 2.41.

In the township the population was spread out, with 12.1% under the age of 18, 4.8% from 18 to 24, 16.4% from 25 to 44, 36.3% from 45 to 64, and 30.4% who were 65 years of age or older. The median age was 56 years. For every 100 females, there were 94.9 males. For every 100 females age 18 and over, there were 92.5 males.

The median income for a household in the township was $29,242, and the median income for a family was $34,821. Males had a median income of $31,125 versus $18,523 for females. The per capita income for the township was $20,793. About 9.7% of families and 14.3% of the population were below the poverty line, including 20.0% of those under age 18 and 7.5% of those age 65 or over.
