= Roscommon County–Blodgett Memorial Airport =

Coordinates: 44°21′35″N 084°40′16″W

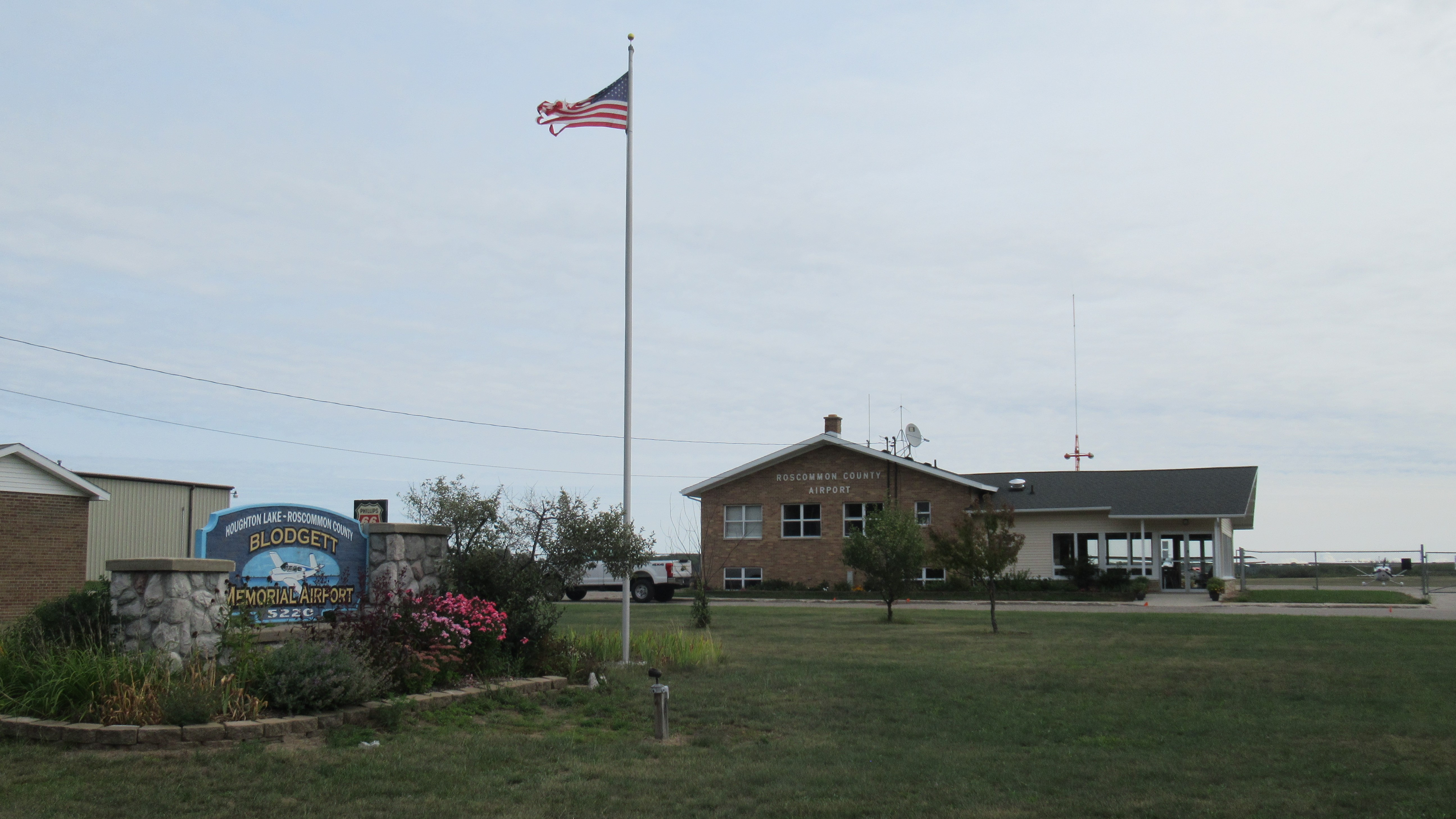
- IATA: HTL; ICAO: KHTL; FAA LID: HTL

Summary
- Airport type: Public
- Owner: Roscommon County
- Serves: Houghton Lake, Michigan
- Elevation AMSL: 1,150 ft / 351 m

Map
- Location of airport in Michigan HTL (the United States)

Runways
Direction	Length		Surface
Direction	ft	m	Surface
9/27	4,000	1,219	Asphalt
18/36	2,200	671	Turf

Statistics (2022)
- Aircraft operations: 12,900
- Source: Federal Aviation Administration

Roscommon County–Blodgett Memorial Airport (IATA: HTL, ICAO: KHTL, FAA LID: HTL) is a county-owned public-use airport located five miles (8 km) northeast of the central business district of Houghton Lake, an unincorporated community in Roscommon County, Michigan, United States. It is included in the Federal Aviation Administration (FAA) National Plan of Integrated Airport Systems for 2017–2021, in which it is categorized as a local general aviation facility.

It was known as Roscommon County Airport until 2005, when it was named to honor Terry Blodgett, the airport's manager from 1987 until his death in 2004, and his father Francis Blodgett, airport manager from 1959 to 1981.

The airport is home to a chapter of the Experimental Aircraft Association, which hosts regular events such as Easter egg drops and fly-in breakfasts with model planes, the opportunity to interact with personal planes, and free flights. The airport is also home to regular veteran's appreciation events.

== Facilities and aircraft ==
Roscommon County–Blodgett Memorial Airport covers an area of 419 acres (170 ha) which contains two runways: 9/27 with a 4,000 x 75 ft (1,219 x 23 m) asphalt pavement and 18/36 with a 2,200 x 100 ft (671 x 30 m) turf surface.

The airport has a fixed-base operator that sells fuel and offers a lounge, restrooms, and other amenities.

For the 12-month period ending December 31, 2022, the airport had 12,900 aircraft operations, all general aviation, an average of 35 per day. There were at that time 21 aircraft based on the field, all single-engine airplanes.

The airport is staffed daily from 8:00 a.m. until 5:30 p.m. It is accessible by road from County Road 100, and is close to M-18, M-157, and U.S. Highway 127.

== Accidents and incidents ==
- On April 14, 2016, an aircraft made an emergency landing at Blodgett Memorial Airport after a goose impacted and broke the airplane's windshield. The bird flew all the way into the aircraft's baggage compartment, and the pilot flew for 20 minutes before making a safe landing.

== See also ==
- List of airports in Michigan
