= Denton Township, Michigan =

- Civil township
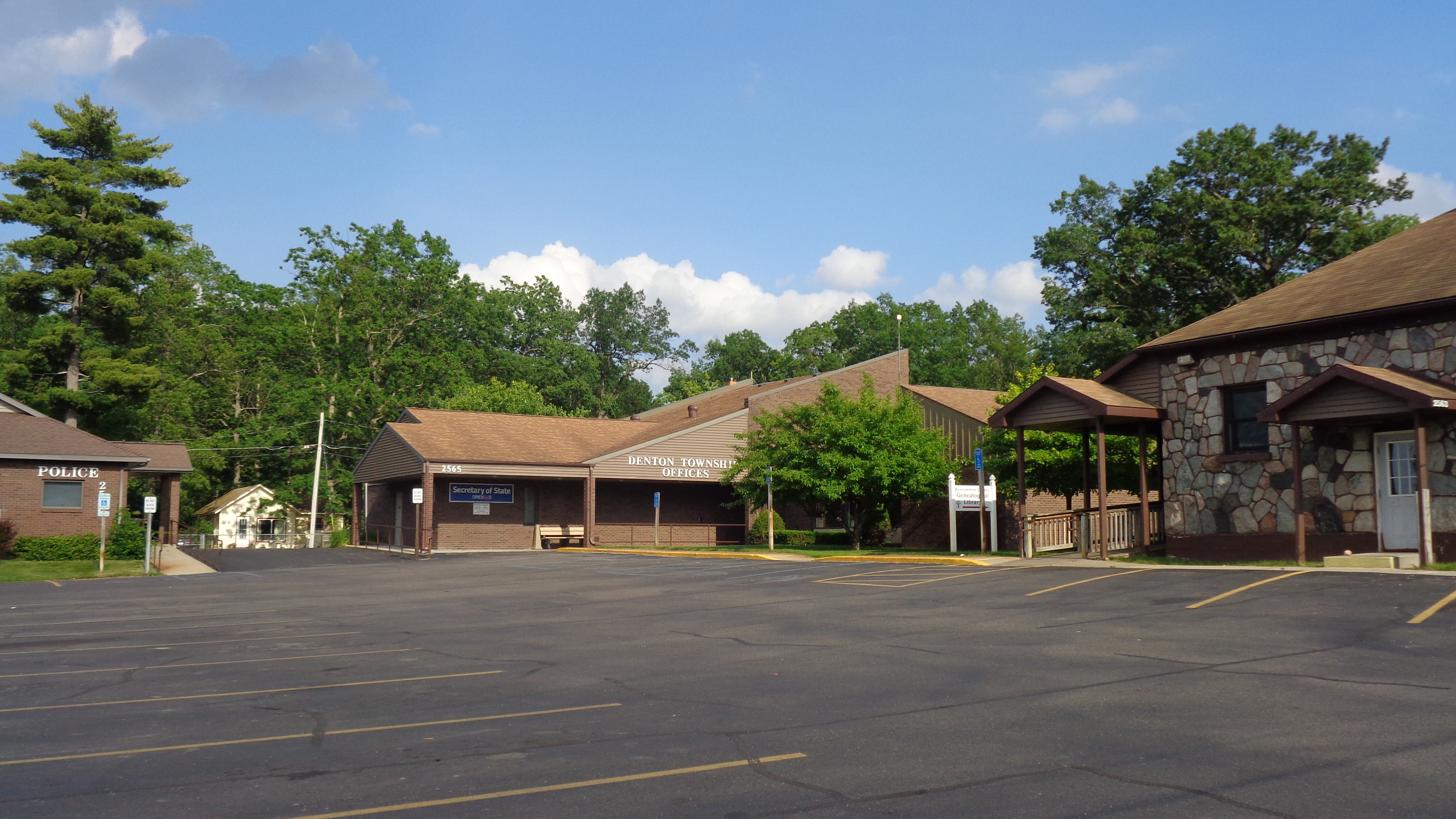
- Denton Township Offices in Prudenville

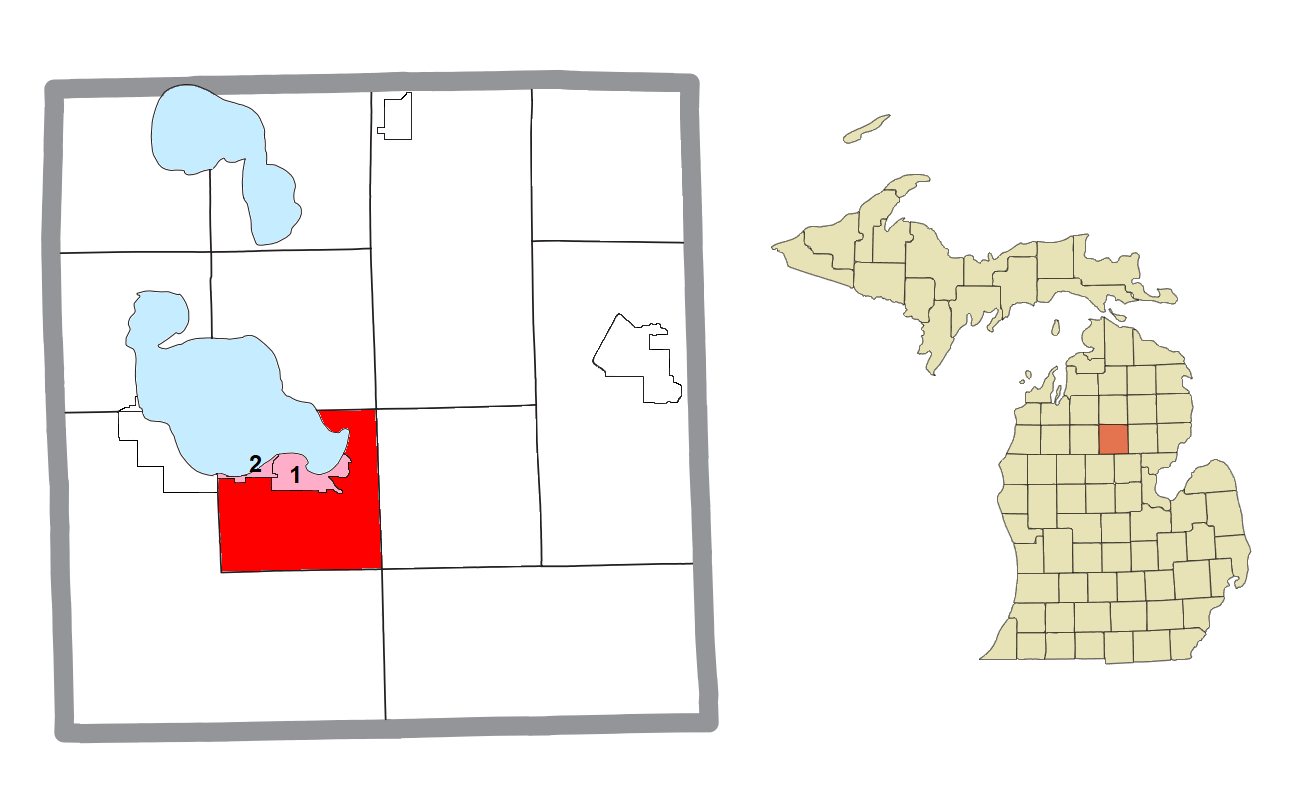
- Location within Roscommon County and the administered CDPs of Prudenville (1) and portion of Houghton Lake (2)

- Location within the state of Michigan Denton Township (the United States)
- Coordinates: 44°17′57″N 84°40′02″W
- Country: United States
- State: Michigan
- County: Roscommon
- Settled: 1870

Government
  - Supervisor: Dave DenBoer
  - Clerk: Theresa Wagner

Area
  - Total: 36.11 sq mi (93.5 km^{2})
  - Land: 26.24 sq mi (68.0 km^{2})
  - Water: 9.87 sq mi (25.6 km^{2})
- Elevation: 1,161 ft (354 m)

Population (2020)
  - Total: 5,293
  - Density: 201.7/sq mi (77.9/km^{2})
- Time zone: UTC-5 (Eastern (EST))
  - Summer (DST): UTC-4 (EDT)
- ZIP code(s): 48629 (Houghton Lake); 48651 (Prudenville)
- Area code: 989
- FIPS code: 26-21640
- GNIS feature ID: 1626177
- Website: Official website

Denton Township is a civil township of Roscommon County in the U.S. state of Michigan. The population was 5,293 at the 2020 census.

== Communities ==
- Houghton Lake is located along the shores of Houghton Lake. Houghton Lake is defined as an unincorporated community and census-designated place. The Houghton Lake 48629 ZIP Code serves the western portion of the township. The Houghton Lake CDP is mostly within neighboring Roscommon Township and further to Lake Township.
- Prudenville is an unincorporated community and census-designated place located entirely within Denton Township along the southeast shores of Houghton Lake. The Prudenville 48651 ZIP Code serves the majority of Denton Township.

== Geography ==
According to the U.S. Census Bureau, the township has a total area of 36.11 square miles (93.52 km^{2}), of which 26.24 square miles (67.96 km^{2}) is land and 9.87 square miles (25.56 km^{2}) (27.33%) is water.

== Demographics ==
As of the census of 2000, there were 5,817 people, 2,649 households, and 1,817 families residing in the township. The population density was 220.6 inhabitants per square mile (85.2/km^{2}). There were 4,872 housing units at an average density of 184.7 per square mile (71.3/km^{2}). The racial makeup of the township was 98.21% White, 0.10% African American, 0.98% Native American, 0.05% Asian, 0.05% Pacific Islander, 0.05% from other races, and 0.55% from two or more races. Hispanic or Latino of any race were 0.79% of the population.

There were 2,649 households, out of which 22.0% had children under the age of 18 living with them, 56.3% were married couples living together, 8.5% had a female householder with no husband present, and 31.4% were non-families. 28.0% of all households were made up of individuals, and 14.0% had someone living alone who was 65 years of age or older. The average household size was 2.19 and the average family size was 2.62.

In the township the population was spread out, with 19.4% under the age of 18, 6.2% from 18 to 24, 20.5% from 25 to 44, 29.9% from 45 to 64, and 24.0% who were 65 years of age or older. The median age was 48 years. For every 100 females, there were 94.2 males. For every 100 females age 18 and over, there were 91.5 males.

The median income for a household in the township was $29,397, and the median income for a family was $35,918. Males had a median income of $33,311 versus $20,957 for females. The per capita income for the township was $18,946. About 8.4% of families and 10.2% of the population were below the poverty line, including 17.8% of those under age 18 and 6.2% of those age 65 or over.
