= Roscommon Township, Michigan =

- Civil township
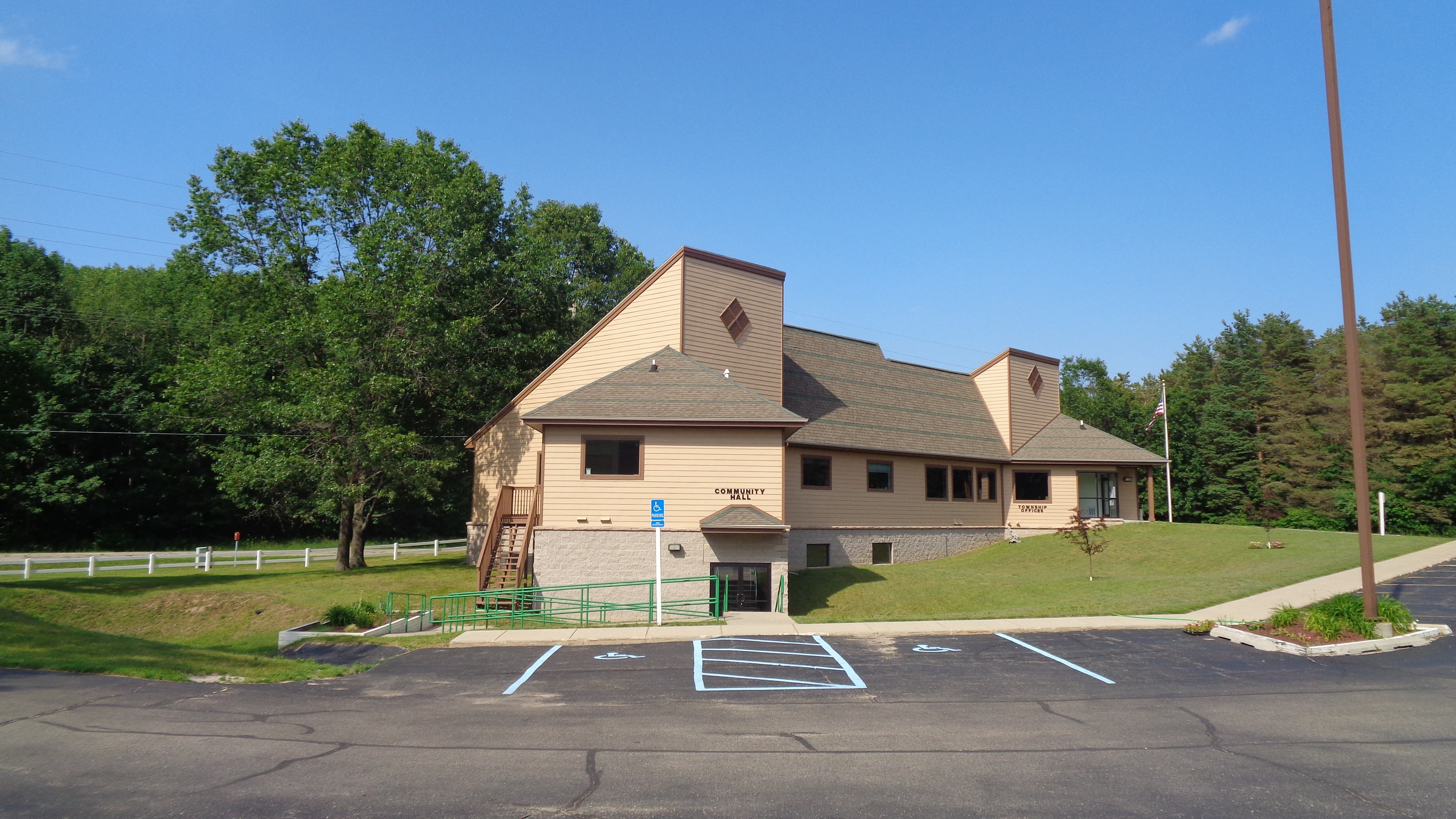
- Roscommon Township Offices

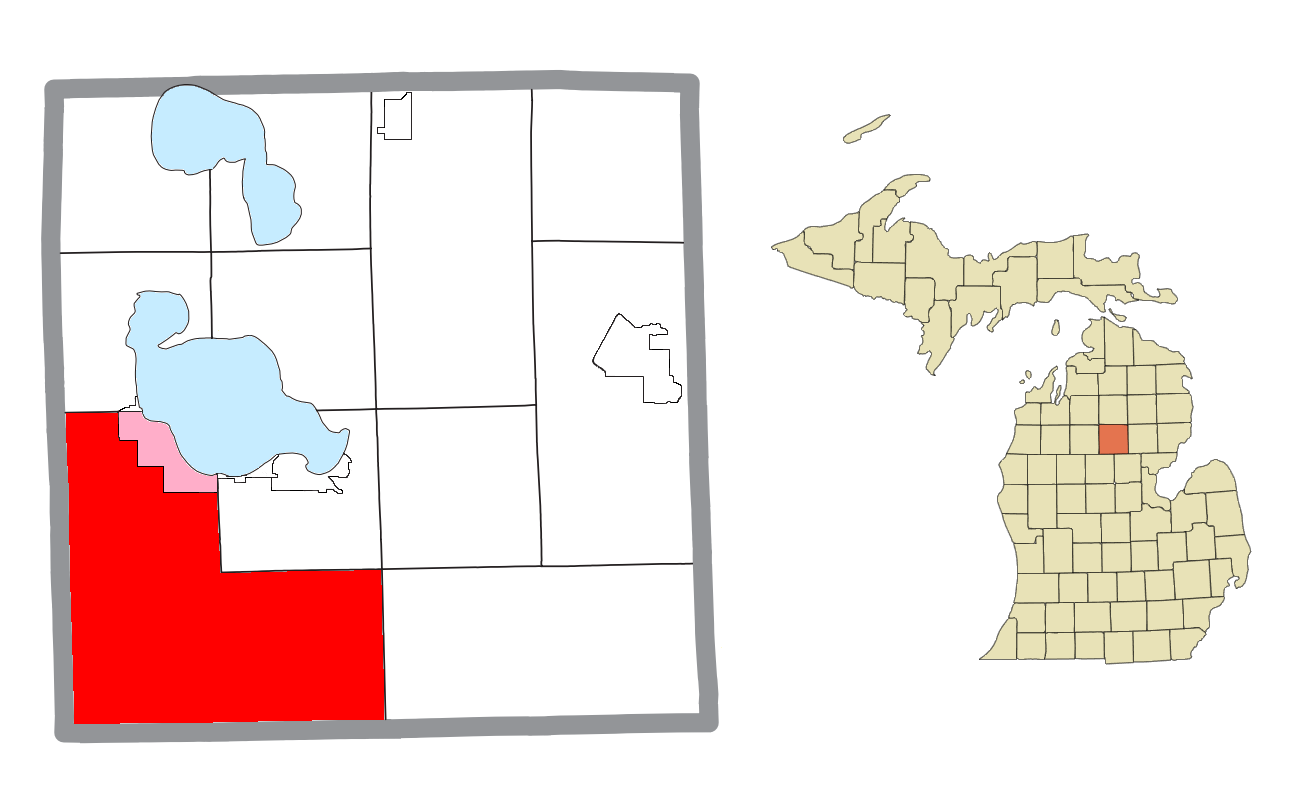
- Location within Roscommon County and an administered portion of the Houghton Lake CDP (pink)

- Location within the state of Michigan Roscommon Township (the United States)
- Coordinates: 44°14′30″N 84°42′59″W
- Country: United States
- State: Michigan
- County: Roscommon
- Established: 1875

Government
  - Supervisor: Diane Randall
  - Clerk: Carie Milburn

Area
  - Total: 108.32 sq mi (280.55 km^{2})
  - Land: 103.32 sq mi (267.60 km^{2})
  - Water: 5.00 sq mi (12.95 km^{2})
- Elevation: 1,122 ft (342 m)

Population (2020)
  - Total: 4,397
  - Density: 42.6/sq mi (16.4/km^{2})
- Time zone: UTC-5 (Eastern (EST))
  - Summer (DST): UTC-4 (EDT)
- ZIP code(s): 48624 (Gladwin); 48625 (Harrison); 48629 (Houghton Lake); 48630 (Hghtn Lk Hts); 48651 (Prudenville)
- Area code: 989
- FIPS code: 26-69560
- GNIS feature ID: 1627003
- Website: Official website

Roscommon Township is a civil township of Roscommon County in the U.S. state of Michigan. The population was 4,397 at the 2020 census.

The village of Roscommon is located to the northeast in Higgins Township.

== Communities ==
- Houghton Lake is a census-designated place and unincorporated community at 44°18′53″N 84°45′53″W along the southwest side of Houghton Lake. The community also extends north into Lake Township and east into Denton Township.
- Houghton Lake Heights is an unincorporated community within the larger census-designated community of Houghton Lake at 44°19′39″N 84°46′28″W.
- Loxley is an unincorporated community within the township at 44°16′12″N 84°47′50″W. Loxley began as a mill and lumber camp settlement in 1904 and was named after Loxley, England. A post office operated in Loxley from January 29, 1904 until about 1917.
- Nellsville is an unincorporated community on the northern border of the township at 44°20′09″N 84°48′48″W. The community is centered along M-55, which forms the boundary with Lake Township, and is just west of U.S. Route 127. The community was founded in 1906 and named after Roscommon Township supervisor Edward Nelson. A post office operated in Nellsville from August 20, 1906 until 1927.
- Verncroft is a former settlement located in the southwest corner of the county. A now-defunct rural post office was established here on September 26, 1914.

== Geography ==
According to the U.S. Census Bureau, the township has a total area of 108.32 square miles (280.55 km^{2}), of which 103.32 square miles (267.60 km^{2}) is land and 5.00 square miles (12.95 km^{2}) (4.62%) is water.

The township is located at the southwest end of Houghton Lake.

== Transportation ==
=== Major highways ===
- US 127 runs south–north through the township.
- M-18 (S. Gladwin Road) runs along the southeastern boundary of the township.
- M-55 runs along the northern portion of the township along Houghton Lake.

=== Airport ===
- Houghton Lake State Airport is located in the northwest corner of the township near the intersection of M-55 and Old U.S. Highway 27.

== Demographics ==
As of the census of 2000, there were 4,249 people, 1,716 households, and 1,158 families residing in the township. The population density was 40.9 inhabitants per square mile (15.8/km^{2}). There were 2,678 housing units at an average density of 25.8 per square mile (9.9/km^{2}). The racial makeup of the township was 97.60% White, 0.80% African American, 0.61% Native American, 0.24% Asian, 0.02% Pacific Islander, 0.05% from other races, and 0.68% from two or more races. Hispanic or Latino of any race were 0.87% of the population.

There were 1,716 households, out of which 27.3% had children under the age of 18 living with them, 55.2% were married couples living together, 8.3% had a female householder with no husband present, and 32.5% were non-families. 27.0% of all households were made up of individuals, and 11.8% had someone living alone who was 65 years of age or older. The average household size was 2.40 and the average family size was 2.89.

In the township the population was spread out, with 24.6% under the age of 18, 6.1% from 18 to 24, 25.6% from 25 to 44, 25.7% from 45 to 64, and 17.9% who were 65 years of age or older. The median age was 41 years. For every 100 females, there were 91.1 males. For every 100 females age 18 and over, there were 91.3 males.

The median income for a household in the township was $28,805, and the median income for a family was $32,426. Males had a median income of $26,793 versus $16,559 for females. The per capita income for the township was $15,508. About 8.4% of families and 13.9% of the population were below the poverty line, including 16.4% of those under age 18 and 9.2% of those age 65 or over.
