= West Branch Community Airport =

Public use airport in West Branch, Michigan

Coordinates: 44°14′41″N 084°10′49″W

West Branch Community Airport (FAA LID: Y31) is a public-use airport located 3 miles southeast of West Branch, Michigan. The airport is publicly owned by the city. The airport covers 520 acres at an elevation of 882 feet above sea level.

A chapter of the Experimental Aircraft Association is based at the airport. It hosts a number of events such as Young Eagles rallies, fly-ins, building seminars, and other social and educational activities.

In 2022, accommodations were made to base a crew at the airport to transport West Branch residents to hospitals should critical care be needed.

== Facilities and aircraft ==
The airport has one runway. Runway 9/27 is 5000 x 100 ft (1524 x 30 m) and is paved with asphalt.

The airport has a fixed-base operator that sells both avgas and jet fuel. Amenities such as a conference room a pilot lounge, snooze rooms, a shower, and courtesy transportation are also available.

For the 12-month period ending December 31, 2021, the airport had 6,000 aircraft operations, an average of 115 per week. It was composed entirely of general aviation. For the same time period, 17 aircraft were based at the airport, all single-engine airplanes.

== Accidents and incidents ==
- On January 12, 2006, a Piper PA-28 Cherokee impacted a deer during its landing roll at West Branch Community Airport. During the landing roll, the pilot felt the airplane "jerk" to the left. She reported she was able to maintain control of the airplane on the runway. A passenger in the airplane stated he saw the deer just prior to it contacting the airplane, but there was not enough time for the pilot to take evasive action.

== See also ==
- List of airports in Michigan
