= Houghton Lake Heights, Michigan =

- Unincorporated community
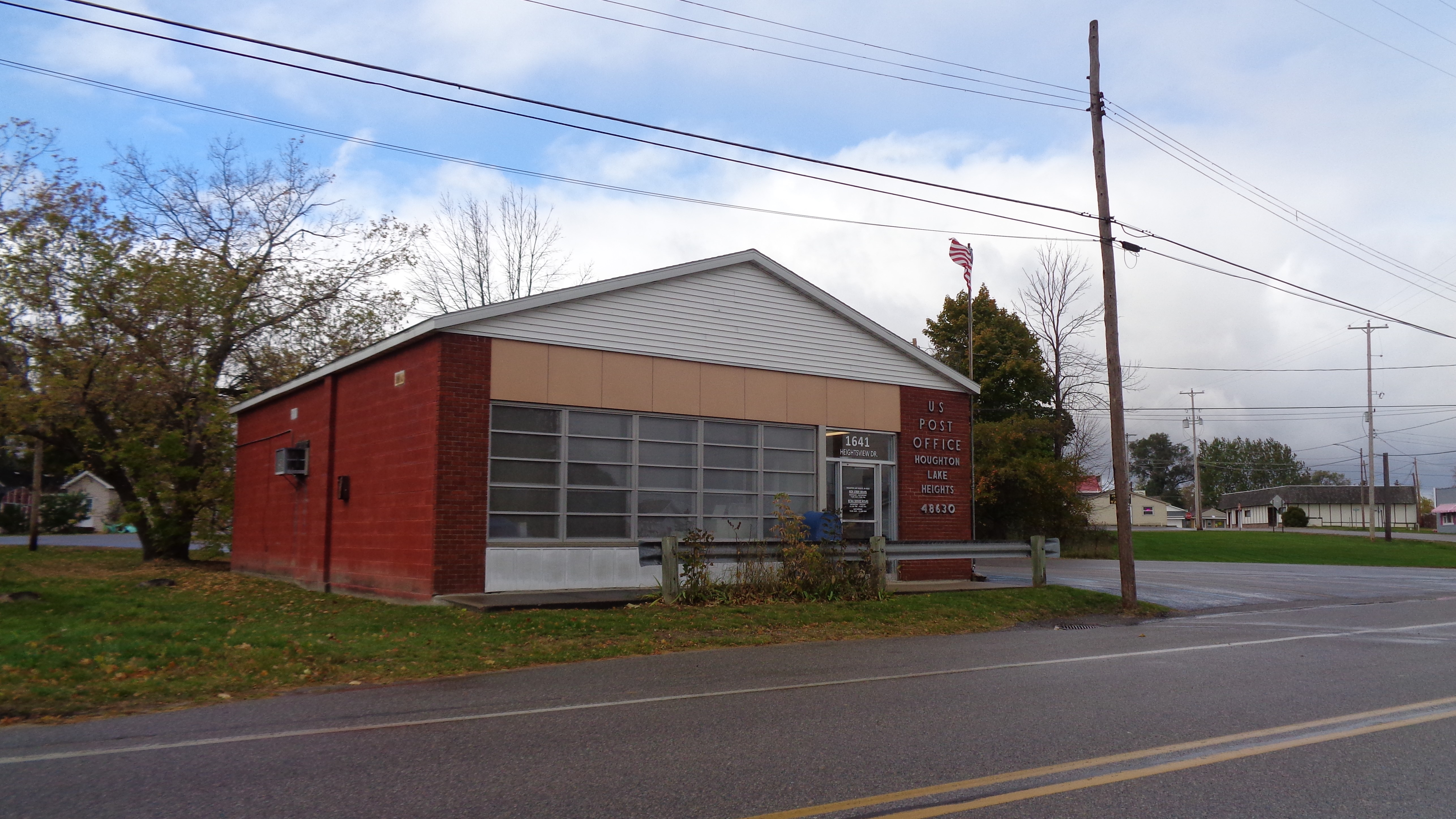
- Houghton Lake Heights Post Office

- Location within the state of Michigan Houghton Lake Heights (the United States)
- Coordinates: 44°19′39″N 84°46′28″W
- Country: United States
- State: Michigan
- County: Roscommon
- Township: Roscommon
- Elevation: 1,175 ft (358 m)
- Time zone: UTC-5 (Eastern (EST))
  - Summer (DST): UTC-4 (EDT)
- ZIP code(s): 48629 (Houghton Lake); 48630
- Area code: 989
- FIPS code: 26-26163
- GNIS feature ID: 628666

Houghton Lake Heights is an unincorporated community located in Roscommon County in the U.S. state of Michigan. Located on the western shores of Houghton Lake within Roscommon Township, the community is contained within the larger census-designated community of Houghton Lake. As an unincorporated community, Houghton Lake Heights has no defined boundaries or population statistics of its own, but it does have its own post office with the 48630 ZIP Code.

== History ==
=== Founding ===
The community began about 1883 as a lumbering settlement with the operations of the S. C. Hall Lumber Company. Because of its elevation, it was called "The Heights" and a post office with that name opened on November 24, 1923. The post office was renamed "Houghton Lake Heights" in 1956.

According to Beulah Carman, in her 1979 book about Houghton Lake:

On September 13, 1913, four men from Mt. Pleasant, William Cooper, Charles F. Meyers, Morris J. Brown and Fred Russel, bought the 180-acre (0.73 km^{2}) William Houghton farm on the east side of Mt. Pleasant Road for $5,000.00."

She continues:

They formed the Houghton Heights Corporation, subdivided the parcel close to the lake and east of the observation platform into Houghton Heights, First and Second Addition, and South Houghton Heights...In 1915, Tip Calkins from Clare built Dad Smith's Hotel, better known to us as the Heights Inn, to accommodate sportsment who enjoyed the luxury of having meals and lodging provided for them...

By most accounts, the 1920s through to the 1950s were the apogee of activity in the Heights. From 1923 to 1939, Floyd Fletcher operated the "Houghton Queen", a large boat that docked in the Heights that carried up to 68 passengers on a cruise around Houghton lake at a fare of $.25 for adults and $.10 for children. There was also a large waterslide built on stilts (often referred to as Sanford's dock) that was in operation in the 1920s. It was removed each winter to prevent ice damage to the structure.

=== Business ===
The Houghton Lake Heights also offered many services in the early to mid 1900s. According to Beulah Carman:

The Heights merchants, because of the variety of stores, hotels, and other attractions, enjoyed a thriving business during the mid-twenties and the thirties, and acquired the reputation and prestige of being the most popular business center of the area. Some of the business places included Bill Park's Grocery, Dr. Snyders Drug Store, the Little Gift Shop, RaWalla Dance Hall, Akin's Hotel, Parker's Barbershop and post office, The Heights Inn, Ray Walling's garage and gas station, Girley's Gift Shop, Tam-a-rack Lodge and Anderson's Patent Medicine Store.

Currently, the Houghton Lake Heights hosts a post office, a public access lakeshore park, and two pubs. Most of the buildings constructed in the 1920s and 1930s have been demolished, however, the Heights Inn still stands, although it is no longer an operating hotel.

Houghton Lake State Airport is listed as being within Houghton Lake Heights.
