= Houghton Lake, Michigan =

- Census-designated place (CDP) & unincorporated community
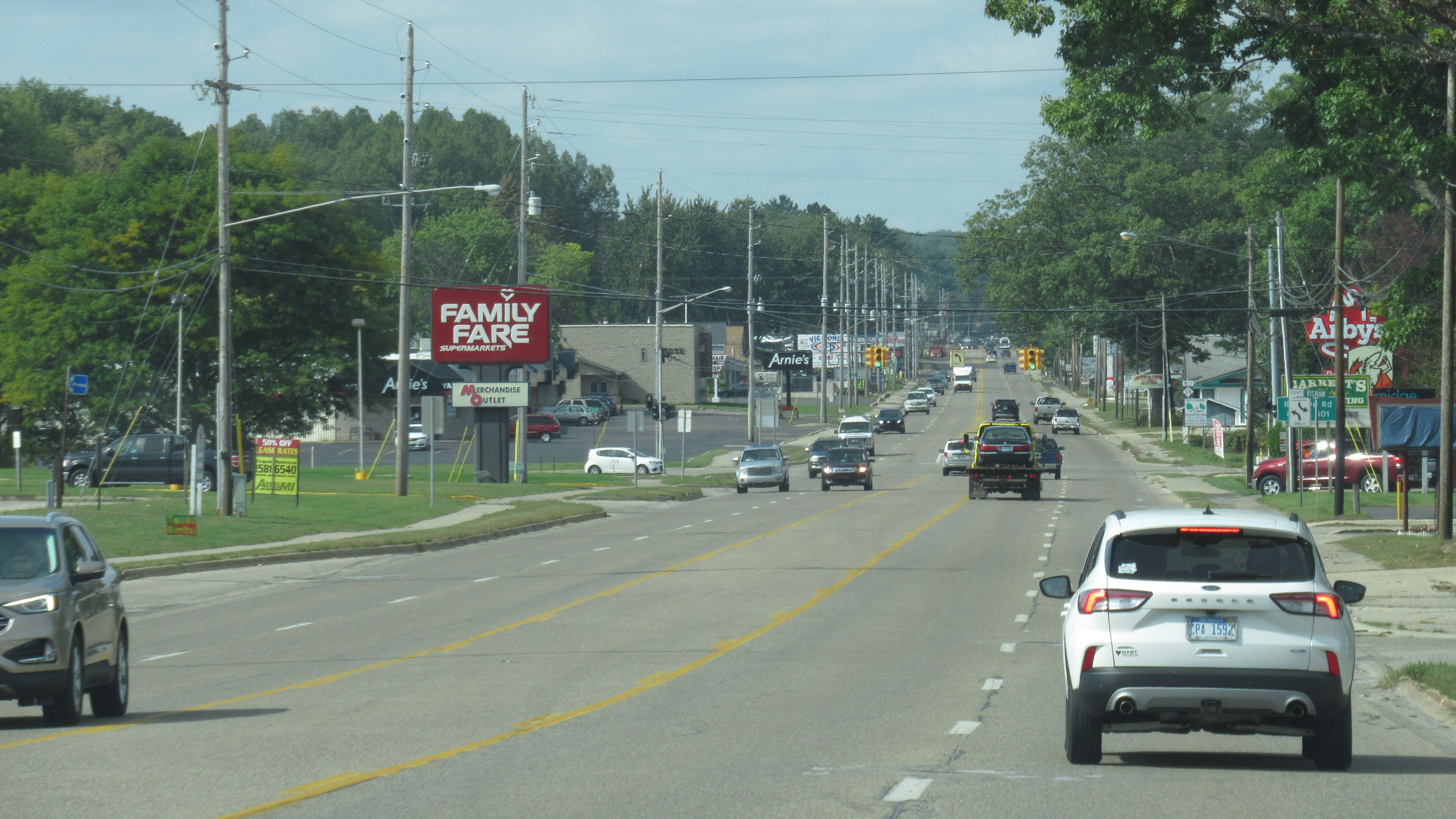
- Looking west along M-55

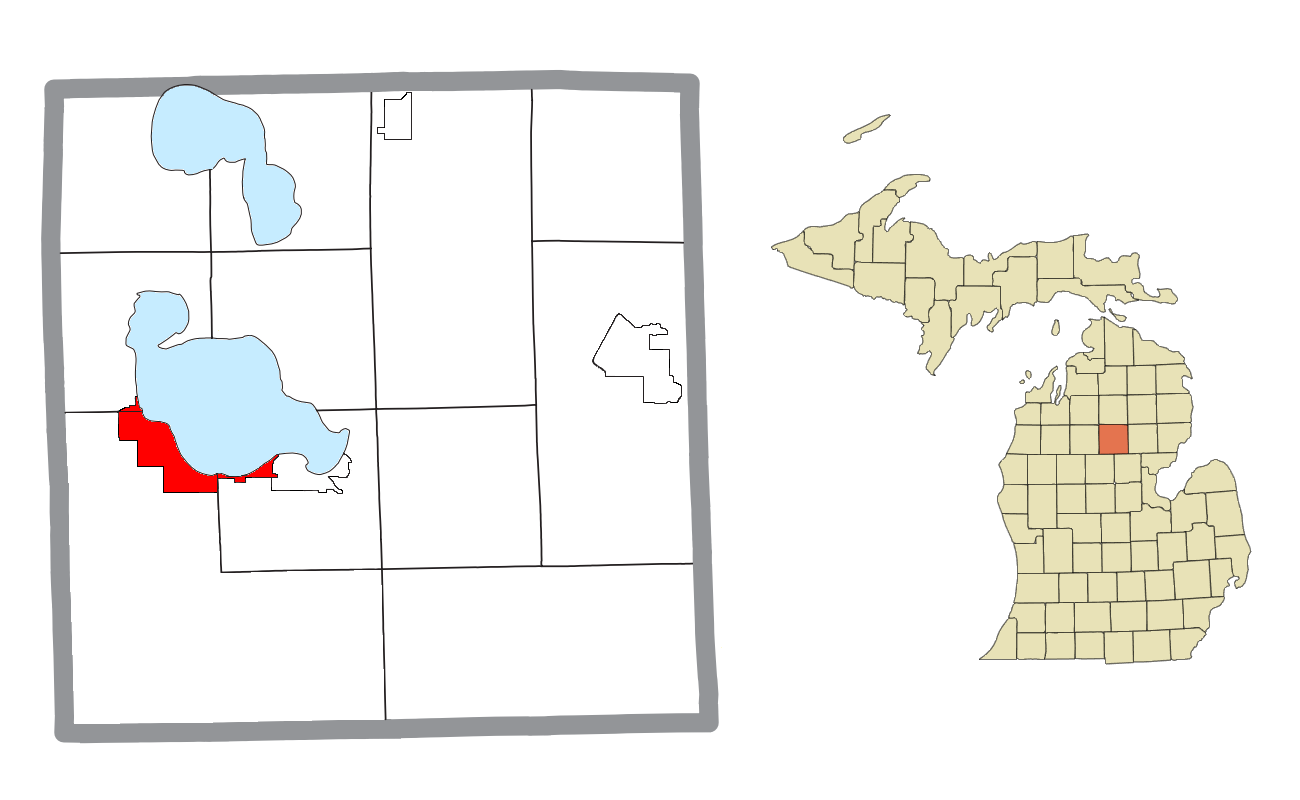
- Location within Roscommon County

- Location within the state of Michigan Location within the United States
- Coordinates: 44°18′53″N 84°45′53″W
- Country: United States
- State: Michigan
- County: Roscommon
- Townships: Denton, Lake, and Roscommon
- Settled: 1873

Area
  - Total: 12.38 sq mi (32.07 km^{2})
  - Land: 10.75 sq mi (27.84 km^{2})
  - Water: 1.63 sq mi (4.22 km^{2})
- Elevation: 1,145 ft (349 m)

Population (2020)
  - Total: 6,000
  - Density: 492.5/sq mi (190.14/km^{2})
- Time zone: UTC−5 (Eastern (EST))
  - Summer (DST): UTC−4 (EDT)
- ZIP code(s): 48629; 48630 (Houghton Lake Heights); 48651 (Prudenville)
- Area code: 989
- FIPS code: 26-39400
- GNIS feature ID: 0628665

Houghton Lake (/ˈhoʊʔən/; HOH-ʼn) is an unincorporated community and census-designated place (CDP) in Roscommon County in the U.S. state of Michigan. The population was 5,294 during the 2020 census, making it the largest unincorporated community in Northern Michigan. The CDP is located within Denton, Lake, and Roscommon townships.

The community of Houghton Lake is named after and situated upon Houghton Lake, the largest inland lake in Michigan. It includes the unincorporated community of Houghton Lake Heights. The CDP of Prudenville is immediately east of Houghton Lake. M-55 is the primary thoroughfare serving the community, running east–west.

== History ==
The area around Houghton Lake has been occupied for thousands of years and is within Odawa and Ojibwe homelands. In the Treaty of Washington of 1836, the Odawa and Ojibwe ceded nearly 16 million acres of their land to the United States in the eastern Upper Peninsula and northwest Lower Peninsula. The following year, Michigan gained statehood, and the area became part of Midland County. The treaty was enacted amid rapid surveying of the Lower Peninsula, including the land around Houghton Lake. The lake was first recorded as Red Lake by surveyor John Brink in 1838. During an 1852 resurvey of the county, the lake was renamed to Houghton Lake, in honor of Michigan's first state geologist, Douglass Houghton.

The first settlers of European descent arrived and settled in 1869. This family, the Emerys, traveled the Saginaw Trail, which would continue to be a primary route for settlers. By 1873, the settlement of Houghton Lake was established. The following year, Roscommon County was established and Houghton Lake was chosen as county seat. This would last until 1878, when the courthouse was relocated to Higgins Lake.

Lumbering had shaped the early development of Houghton Lake. In the mid-1800s, lumber camps in the area were abundant, and roads, towns, and railways were established to support the lumber trade. Logs were floated from Houghton Lake down the Muskegon River to sawmills and shipping facilities in Muskegon. It has been estimated that in 1860 alone, mills on the Muskegon River produced 75,000,000 board feet of lumber.

By the late 1800s, lumbering became the primary industry in the area. As lumber camps sprung up around sawmills, more settlers arrived. Around 1883, a community at Houghton Lake was created.

The lumber industry declined in the early 1900s, leading to the repurposing of railways that were previously used for the transportation of lumber. They were now designated as passenger lines, taking outdoorsmen to fish, hunt, and experience the beauty of the "north country." The Houghton Lake fishery became renowned and attracted visitors.

By the mid-1900s, Houghton Lake had gained a reputation as a desirable resort area. Today, thousands of seasonal cottages, year-round homes, and businesses line the lake. Houghton Lake remains a popular vacation spot in Michigan, attracting thousands of visitors to its shores each year.

In 1927, the "Johnson Dance Hall," presently known as "The Playhouse," was erected and served for many years as the entertainment center for the area. The Playhouse and the surrounding property are now home to The Houghton Lake Historical Society, as well as the yearly event "Historic Village Days."

The town was struck by a windstorm on June 11, 1932, which killed four people. During a snowstorm that caused reduced visibility, two married couples died when they drove their cars into the frozen lake on New Year's Day, 1957. The Limberlost Hotel, situated on the shore of Houghton Lake, was destroyed by a fire in 1968 causing one injury but no deaths. Two men drowned in a snowmobile accident during a carnival on the frozen lake in 1980.

== Geography ==
According to the U.S. Census Bureau, the CDP has a total area of 12.38 square miles (32.06 km^{2}), of which 10.75 square miles (27.84 km^{2}) are land and 1.63 square miles (4.22 km^{2}) (13.17%) are water.

=== Climate ===
Climate data for Houghton Lake, Michigan (Roscommon County – Blodgett Memorial Airport), 1991–2020 normals, (Note: Mean monthly maxima and minima (i.e. the highest and lowest temperature readings during an entire month or year) calculated based on data at said location from 1991 to 2020.) extremes 1913–present
Month	Jan	Feb	Mar	Apr	May	Jun	Jul	Aug	Sep	Oct	Nov	Dec	Year
Record high °F (°C)	58 (14)	64 (18)	85 (29)	89 (32)	96 (36)	107 (42)	107 (42)	100 (38)	100 (38)	88 (31)	77 (25)	64 (18)	107 (42)
Mean maximum °F (°C)	45 (7)	47 (8)	62 (17)	75 (24)	84 (29)	90 (32)	90 (32)	89 (32)	85 (29)	76 (24)	60 (16)	48 (9)	92 (33)
Mean daily maximum °F (°C)	26.9 (−2.8)	29.6 (−1.3)	40.4 (4.7)	53.8 (12.1)	67.2 (19.6)	76.7 (24.8)	80.5 (26.9)	78.3 (25.7)	70.6 (21.4)	56.8 (13.8)	43.1 (6.2)	32.1 (0.1)	54.7 (12.6)
Daily mean °F (°C)	19.1 (−7.2)	20.3 (−6.5)	29.7 (−1.3)	42.2 (5.7)	54.7 (12.6)	63.9 (17.7)	67.8 (19.9)	65.8 (18.8)	58.3 (14.6)	46.8 (8.2)	35.5 (1.9)	25.6 (−3.6)	44.1 (6.7)
Mean daily minimum °F (°C)	11.4 (−11.4)	11.0 (−11.7)	19.1 (−7.2)	30.7 (−0.7)	42.3 (5.7)	51.1 (10.6)	55.0 (12.8)	53.3 (11.8)	46.1 (7.8)	36.8 (2.7)	27.9 (−2.3)	19.0 (−7.2)	33.6 (0.9)
Mean minimum °F (°C)	−11 (−24)	−12 (−24)	−5 (−21)	16 (−9)	28 (−2)	37 (3)	42 (6)	39 (4)	30 (−1)	23 (−5)	13 (−11)	0 (−18)	−16 (−27)
Record low °F (°C)	−32 (−36)	−48 (−44)	−25 (−32)	−15 (−26)	12 (−11)	23 (−5)	26 (−3)	27 (−3)	19 (−7)	7 (−14)	−14 (−26)	−28 (−33)	−48 (−44)
Average precipitation inches (mm)	1.70 (43)	1.41 (36)	1.78 (45)	3.10 (79)	3.15 (80)	3.22 (82)	2.74 (70)	2.86 (73)	2.59 (66)	3.08 (78)	2.20 (56)	1.76 (45)	29.59 (752)
Average snowfall inches (cm)	16.4 (42)	13.6 (35)	8.3 (21)	4.4 (11)	0.1 (0.25)	0.0 (0.0)	0.0 (0.0)	0.0 (0.0)	0.0 (0.0)	0.5 (1.3)	7.5 (19)	15.1 (38)	65.9 (167)
Average precipitation days (≥ 0.01 in)	14.0	11.4	10.5	12.0	11.7	10.9	10.0	9.5	10.9	13.5	13.2	13.5	141.1
Average snowy days (≥ 0.1 in)	12.8	10.6	5.9	2.9	0.1	0.0	0.0	0.0	0.0	0.3	5.8	10.6	49.0
Source: NOAA

== Demographics ==
Historical population
Census	Pop.	Note	%±
1990	3,353		—
2000	3,749		11.8%
2010	3,427		−8.6%
2020	5,294		54.5%
U.S. Decennial Census

=== 2020 census ===
As of the 2020 census, Houghton Lake had a population of 5,294. The population density was 492.5 inhabitants per square mile (190.2/km^{2}). The median age was 54.1 years. 15.6% of residents were under the age of 18 and 30.1% were 65 years of age or older. For every 100 females, there were 95.2 males, and for every 100 females age 18 and over, there were 95.3 males.

80.2% of residents lived in urban areas, while 19.8% lived in rural areas.

There were 2,524 households in Houghton Lake, of which 18.7% had children under the age of 18 living in them. Of all households, 39.1% were married-couple households, 23.5% were households with a male householder and no spouse or partner present, and 28.7% were households with a female householder and no spouse or partner present. About 37.1% of all households were made up of individuals, and 18.5% had someone living alone who was 65 years of age or older.

There were 4,214 housing units, of which 40.1% were vacant. The homeowner vacancy rate was 2.8% and the rental vacancy rate was 6.3%.

Racial composition as of the 2020 census
Race	Number	Percent
White	4,959	93.7%
Black or African American	17	0.3%
American Indian and Alaska Native	30	0.6%
Asian	30	0.6%
Native Hawaiian and Other Pacific Islander	1	0.0%
Some other race	20	0.4%
Two or more races	237	4.5%
Hispanic or Latino (of any race)	98	1.9%

=== 2010 census ===
As of the 2010 census, there were 1,646 households, out of which 23.9% had children under the age of 18 living with them, 49.7% were married couples living together, 9.2% had a female householder with no husband present, and 37.4% were non-families. 32.1% of all households comprised individuals, and 14.5% had someone living alone who was 65 years of age or older. The average household size was 2.23 and the average family size was 2.78.

In the CDP, the population was spread out, with 21.4% under the age of 18, 6.7% from 18 to 24, 23.3% from 25 to 44, 26.7% from 45 to 64, and 21.8% who were 65 years of age or older. The median age was 44 years. For every 100 females, there were 89.7 males. For every 100 females age 18 and over, there were 89.5 males.

=== Income and poverty ===
The median income for a household in the CDP was $27,443, and the median income for a family was $30,735. Males had a median income of $23,346 compared to $16,111 for females. The per capita income for the CDP was $16,862. About 10.2% of families and 16.0% of the population were below the poverty line, including 18.6% of those under age 18 and 7.7% of those age 65 or over.

== Transportation ==
=== Bus ===
- Indian Trails provides daily intercity bus service between St. Ignace and East Lansing, Michigan.
- Greyhound Lines provides daily bus service to the Greyhound network from Houghton Lake.

=== Major highways ===
- US 127 runs north to south, west of Houghton Lake. The highway begins at I-75 south of Grayling and runs into central and southern Michigan via the cities of Mt. Pleasant, Lansing, and Jackson, before entering Ohio.
- M-55 runs east and west through Houghton Lake. The highway begins near Lake Michigan in Manistee and runs east through Cadillac and Lake City before reaching Houghton Lake. The highway continues eastward through nearby Prudenville and into West Branch before ending near Lake Huron in Tawas City.

=== Airport ===
- Houghton Lake State Airport is located in the northwest corner of Houghton Lake near the intersection of M-55 and Old U.S. Highway 27.

=== Public transit ===
- Roscommon County Transportation Authority provides bus service anywhere in Roscommon County door-to-door for a maximum fee of $3.00 per ride, one-way, and as low as $.75 each way for students and senior citizens.

== Local Activities and Attractions ==
Houghton Lake, situated in Michigan, includes beaches such as Heights Park Beach on Hubbard Street and Sullivan Beach on Park Street. The area has various resorts and accommodations for visitors.

The region offers numerous nature-related activities. The Ausable Birding Trail, which hosts species like Kirtland's warblers and bald eagles, provides opportunities for birdwatching.

Houghton Lake also supports outdoor activities such as kayaking, ORV trails, and fishing, attracting outdoor enthusiasts.

=== Tip Up Town USA ===
Houghton Lake hosts Tip Up Town USA, Michigan's longest-running and largest winter festival. Held throughout January, Tip Up Town includes a variety of events such as an opening assembly, the Polar Bear Plunge, fundraising auctions, and contests for honorary titles. The festival culminates on the fourth weekend of January with a parade and winter carnival, which feature ice fishing, contests, carnival rides, and snowmobile races.

=== Fishing ===
Houghton Lake, covering 22,000 acres, is Michigan's largest inland lake. It is often referred to as a "Fish Factory" due to its rich fish habitat. The lake is relatively shallow, with a maximum depth of 24 feet, and features extensive weed bed cover, providing an ideal environment for fish. There are seven public access sites on the lake, and a supporting commercial infrastructure, including bait and tackle shops, marinas, and boat dealerships, has developed around the recreational fishing industry.

=== Golf ===
There are three golf courses in Houghton Lake. They are:

- Pine View Highlands, which has won several awards, including “One Of The Gems Of The North” by The Detroit News, “One Of The Top Picks Of Michigan Courses” by AAA Michigan Living Magazine, and “#1 People’s Choice Award” by Roscommon County
- The Quest Golf Club is a championship course designed by PGA professional Ken Green.
- White Deer Country Club

=== Historic Village Museum ===
The Houghton Lake Historic Village Museum features a recreated village containing 14 historical buildings that have been restored or rebuilt to reflect life during the logging era of the late 1800s. Artifacts from this period of northern Michigan's history are housed in a circa 1876 hand-hewn log schoolhouse. The village museum also includes a chapel, town hall, various businesses, and two homes.
