= Houghton Lake (Michigan) =

Lake in Michigan, United States

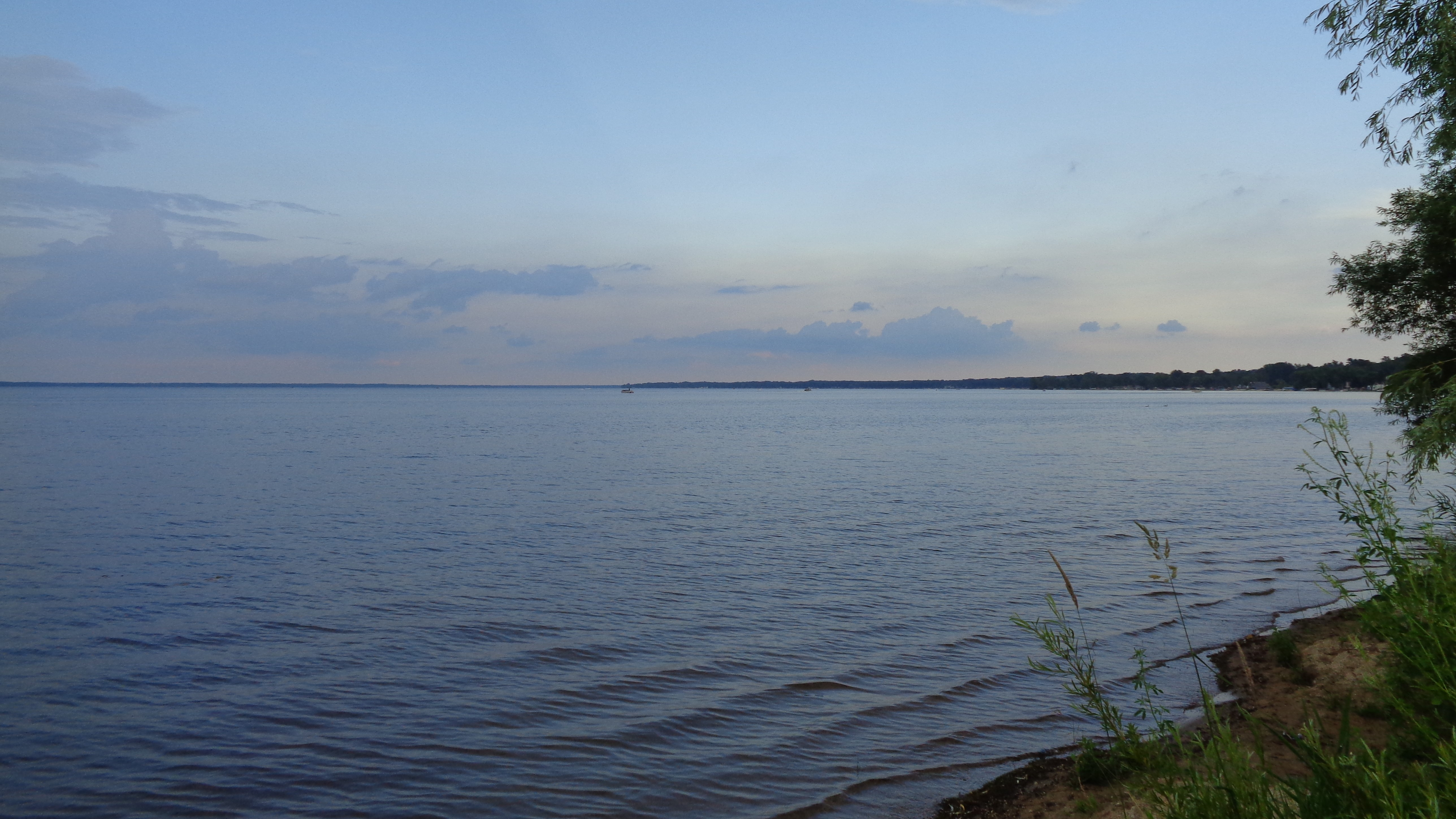

- Location within Michigan
- Location: Roscommon County, Michigan
- Coordinates: 44°20′20″N 84°43′30″W
- Type: mesotrophic
- Primary inflows: Cut River
- Primary outflows: Muskegon River
- Basin countries: United States
- Max. length: 10.0 mi (16.1 km)
- Max. width: 5.5 mi (8.9 km)
- Surface area: 20,044 acres (8,112 ha)
- Average depth: 9 ft (2.7 m)
- Max. depth: 21 ft (6.4 m)
- Residence time: 1.2 years
- Shore length^{1}: c. 30 miles (48 km)
- Surface elevation: 1,138 feet (347 m)
- Settlements: Prudenville, Houghton Lake, Houghton Lake Heights
- ^{1} Shore length is not a well-defined measure.

Houghton Lake is a lake in Roscommon County, in the U.S. state of Michigan. The unincorporated community of Prudenville is at the southeastern end of the lake, while the unincorporated communities of Houghton Lake and Houghton Lake Heights are on the southwest and west shores. It is the largest inland lake in the state of Michigan, and one of the largest natural inland lakes in the United States. The lake is approximately 10 miles (16 km) north to south, and about 5 1/2 miles (8.9 km) at it widest point. Houghton Lake has c. 30 miles (48 km) of total shoreline and its waters cover 20,044 acres (81.12 km^{2}). It is an extremely popular resort and fishing area year round. Houghton Lake is the site of Tip-Up-Town USA, a large ice fishing and winter sports festival with several events on the frozen waters of the lake itself. Houghton Lake is named after the first state geologist, Douglass Houghton who explored the area. Houghton County, in the Upper Peninsula of Michigan is also named after Douglass Houghton. The name of the lake is pronounced by Michigan citizens as "HOTE'n" (/ˈhoʊʔn̩/).

The lake receives the waters of spring-fed Higgins Lake through the Cut River and, in turn, is the headwaters for the Muskegon River, which flows out of the North Bay in the northwest corner of the lake. The lake is partially within four townships: Markey Township on the northeast, Denton Township on the southeast, Roscommon Township on the southwest, and Lake Township on the northwest. The lake is mid to late mesotrophic in profile, and is considered to be a warm water, shallow lake, with the average depth being less than 9 ft. The maximum depth is 35 ft. The lake offers almost every species of game and panfish found in Michigan with the exception of the trout/salmon families, the sturgeon, the muskellunge, and white bass. Common catches include northern pike, bluegill, walleye, crappie, yellow perch and both largemouth bass and smallmouth bass.

M-55 follows the southern shore, while U.S. Highway 127 passes just to the west. M-18 and Interstate 75 pass just to the east.

Houghton Lake is notable for the annual winter carnival, Tip Up Town USA, which is held during two consecutive weekends in January. The name for the festival originated from the flag-like devices—"tip-ups", used for ice fishing. The USA was added later. Tip Up Town Badges, required for entry to the Tip Up Town site on the south shore of Houghton Lake, are sold annually at local businesses.

== See also ==
- List of lakes in Michigan
