= U.S. Route 127 in Michigan =

U.S. Highway in Michigan

US Highway 127
- US 127 highlighted in red

Route information
- Maintained by MDOT
- Length: 212.168 mi (341.451 km)
- Existed: November 11, 1926–present
- History: Extended in 2002

Major junctions
- South end: US 127 near Waldron
- US 223 near Somerset; US 12 near Somerset; I-94 in Jackson; I-96 / I-496 in Lansing; I-496 in Lansing; I-69 near East Lansing; US 10 near Clare
- North end: I-75 near Grayling

Location
- Country: United States
- State: Michigan
- Counties: Lenawee, Hillsdale, Jackson, Ingham, Clinton, Gratiot, Isabella, Clare, Roscommon, Crawford

Highway system
- United States Numbered Highway System; List; Special; Divided; Michigan State Trunkline Highway System; Interstate; US; State; Byways
← M-126	→ Bus. US 127

US Highway 127 (US 127) is a part of the United States Numbered Highway System that runs from Chattanooga, Tennessee, to the Lower Peninsula of Michigan. In Michigan, it is a state trunkline highway that runs for 212.2 miles (341.5 km), entering from Ohio south of Hudson and ending at a partial interchange with Interstate 75 (I-75) south of Grayling. US 127 is the primary route connecting Lansing and Central Michigan to Northern Michigan and the Mackinac Bridge. From the south side of Jackson northerly, it is mostly a four-lane freeway. A notable exception is a 16-mile (26 km) stretch from north of St. Johns to just south of Ithaca, where the highway is built as an expressway and speed limits are lower. South of Jackson to the state line, the trunkline is a two-lane, undivided highway with access from adjacent properties.

The highway was first designated on November 11, 1926, along a series of existing state highways from Lansing southward toward Toledo. In 1930, the southern end was rerouted south of Somerset in rural northwestern Lenawee County to a course that ran directly south to the Ohio state line; the remainder was renumbered US 223. Starting in the 1950s, the highway was reconfigured to bypass Mason and other communities, converting US 127 into a freeway from Jackson to the Lansing area by the mid-1970s. When the Michigan Department of Transportation (MDOT) successfully petitioned the American Association of State Highway and Transportation Officials (AASHTO) in 1999 to remove US 27 from the state, US 127 was to be extended northward from Lansing to Grayling as the replacement designation. This change was made in 2002, resulting in the current configuration of the highway in Michigan. The United States Congress has designated an additional Interstate Highway, to be part of I-73, that would replace most or all of US 127 through Central and Southern Michigan, but any plans by MDOT to complete this highway were cancelled in 2001.

== Route description ==
Running just about 212.2 miles (341.5 km) in Michigan, US 127 runs north–south up the center of the Lower Peninsula. North of its junction with US 223 in Lenawee County, it is listed as a part of the National Highway System, a system of roads importance to the nation's economy, defense and mobility. As a state trunkline highway, the roadway is maintained by the Michigan Department of Transportation (MDOT), and it includes approximately 162.6 miles (261.7 km) of freeway in two segments, the southernmost running between Jackson and Clinton counties, separated by a 16-mile-long (16 mi) gap from the northernmost segment between Gratiot and Crawford counties. According to the department, 1,253 vehicles use US 127 on average near the state line, and 68,853 vehicles do so between M-43 and Kalamazoo Street in Lansing, the lowest and highest traffic counts along the highway in 2013, respectively.

=== State line to Lansing ===
US 127 enters Michigan as a two-lane highway south of Hudson called Meridian Road, which follows the course (with minor deviations) of the Michigan Meridian used to survey Michigan in the early 19th century. From the state line north, US 127 follows the Hillsdale–Lenawee county line north through agricultural areas in Southern Michigan. The highway intersects M-34 at Hudson. Near Beecher Road north of the city, US 127 veers westward, off the county line and travels fully within Hillsdale County for about six miles (9.7 km). Near intersections with Manitou and Adams roads south of Addison, it crosses fully into Lenawee County. The highway continues due north from Addison to an intersection with US 223's northern terminus in the northwestern corner of the county, where US 127 turns northwesterly.

About a mile (1.6 km) farther north, US 127 intersects US 12 east of Somerset. US 127 continues northward, clipping through the corner of Hillsdale County and crossing into Jackson County. The highway follows Meridian Road through the southern area of the county until the interchange with M-50 southeast of Jackson. There US 127 transitions into a full freeway bypass to the east of Jackson while Business US 127 (Bus. US 127) follows M-50 into the city. The freeway crosses the Grand River twice near the South Street interchange. It also crosses a rail line of the Norfolk Southern Railway near the Page Avenue interchange. Northeast of Jackson, US 127 meets I-94 and turns westward to run concurrently with it along the northern edge of Jackson. US 127 crosses the Grand River again on this 3 1/2-mile (5.6 km) section of I-94 before turning northward again.

The US 127 freeway continues northward, concurrent with M-50 for the first mile and a half (2.4 km) north of I-94. The freeway runs through rural northern Jackson County, paralleled by State Road before curving northwesterly near the county line with Ingham County. US 127 passes through Leslie with Churchill and Hull roads running parallel on either side of the freeway. US 127 loses these companion roads at Mason where it curves northwest to the Lansing area.

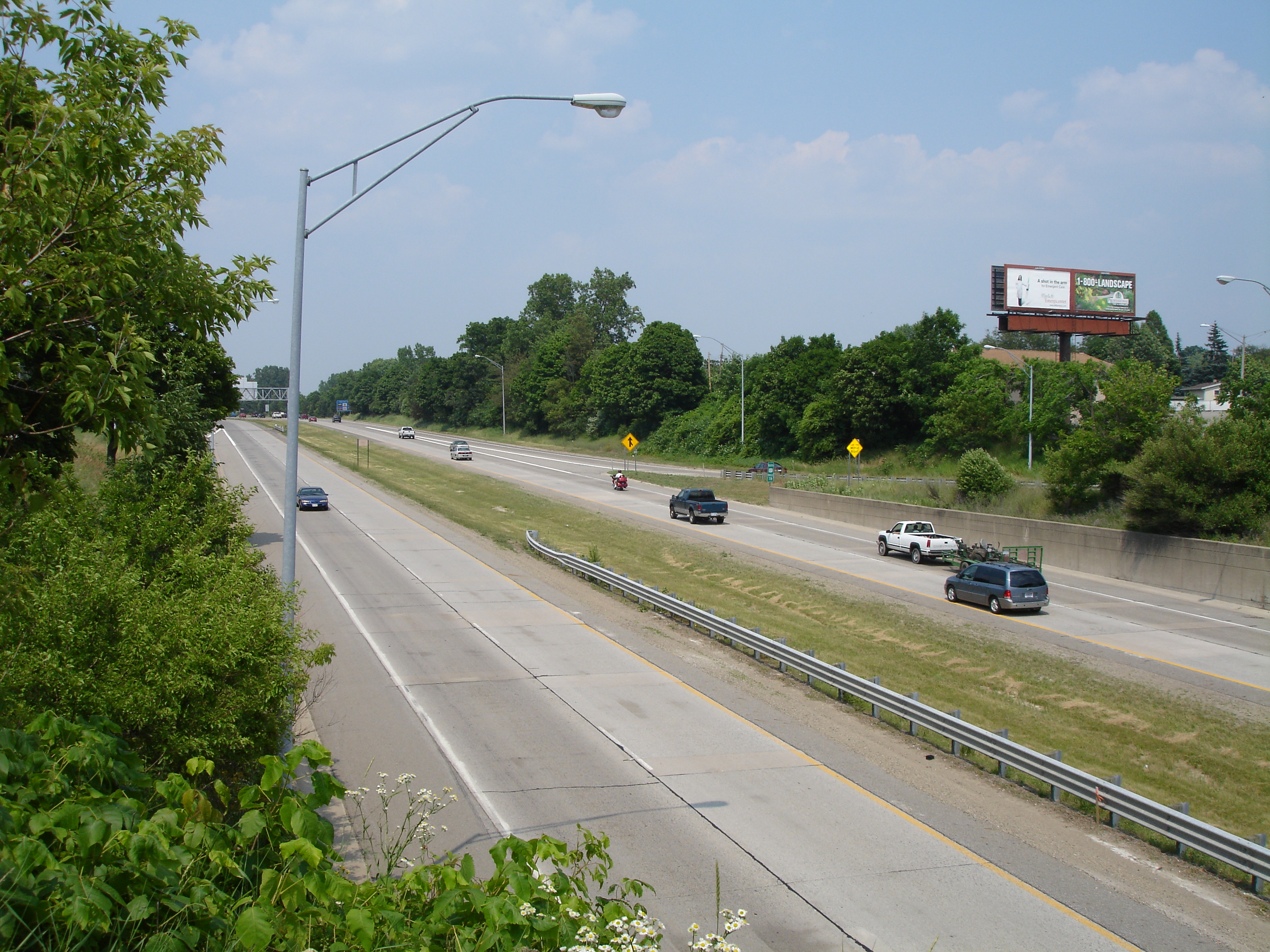
US 127 through Lansing

On the southeastern side of the capital city, US 127 meets I-96. From this interchange northward, the freeway is also designated as part of I-496 (Ransom E. Olds Freeway). The I-496/US 127 freeway runs northward through suburban Delhi Township and into the city of Lansing. Right near the Red Cedar River, just west of the Michigan State University campus, I-496 and US 127 separate as US 127 continues north and I-496 turns west. This side of the city is mostly residential neighborhoods as US 127 runs along the East Lansing border, but there is a commercial area surrounding the Lake Lansing Road interchange before the highway crosses into Clinton County. US 127 meets I-69 northeast of Lansing, at the 1998–2002 terminus of the highway. From here north, US 127 follows the former US 27 north to Grayling.

=== Central Michigan ===
The freeway continues northward through rural Central Michigan farmlands. The freeway passes over the Looking Glass River near DeWitt. At Price Road, Bus. US 127 splits off to connect into St. Johns while the freeway bypasses the city to the east. US 127 intersects M-21 due east of downtown St. Johns before the freeway curves west and then north to intersect the northern end of the business loop. North of this interchange, for about 16 miles (26 km), US 127 follows an expressway segment. It is a four-lane divided highway with some local driveway access and cross traffic through at-grade intersections.

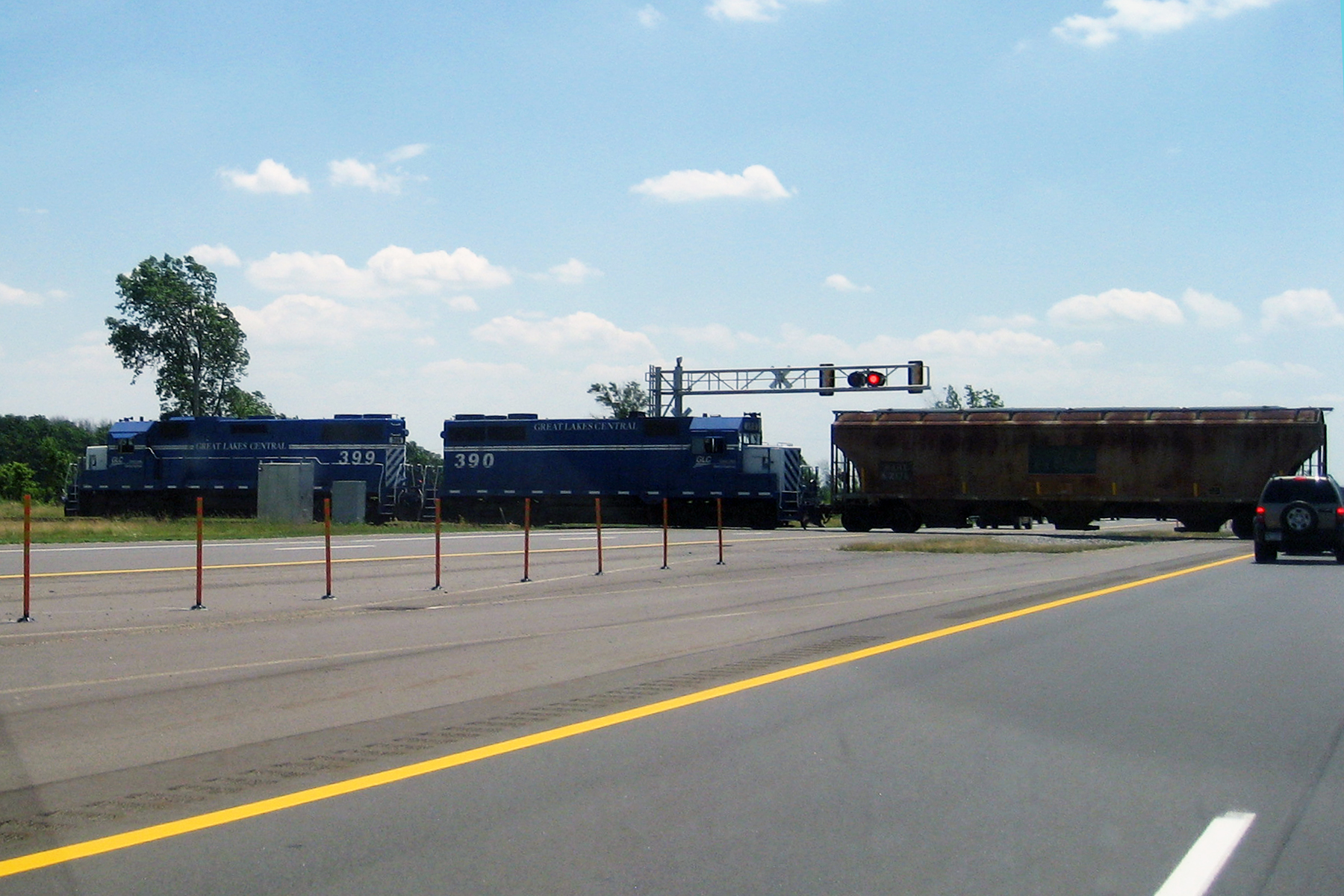
Train crossing near the Maple River and M-57

The expressway segment passes through an area that is mostly farms with occasional business. Just north of the Gratiot County line, the highway crosses the Maple River in the large wetlands area of Maple River State Game Area. North of the river, the expressway crosses a rail line at grade north of the one interchange along the expressway, connecting with M-57. South of Ithaca, the highway crosses the Bad River and transitions back to a freeway for the remainder of its routing. There are two interchanges on either end of Ithaca for that city's Bus. US 127 as the freeway runs east of that city's downtown area. US 127 runs due northward until curving northwesterly to pass between Alma and St. Louis. At the adjacent partial interchanges for Lincoln and State roads, two separate business loops depart from the freeway to run through the two cities. The Bus. US 127 for Alma follows Lincoln Road westward, while the one for St. Louis runs north on State Road. The freeway crosses the Pine River while running between Alma and St. Louis before intersecting M-46 and the northern ends of the two business loops at another pair of adjacent partial interchanges.

North of Alma, US 127 turns due north again and crosses into Isabella County. It runs near the campus of Central Michigan University, crossing the Chippewa River in Mount Pleasant. Mount Pleasant is also home to the Saginaw Band of Chippewa Indians and their tribal reservation. The area between the directional interchanges for Bus. US 127 in Mount Pleasant is marked by residential neighborhoods; the location of the M-20 interchange has some commercial properties, however. Otherwise, the landscape in Isabella County is mostly farms adjacent to the freeway.

The business loop for Clare splits from the main freeway south of the city, and it is also signed to provide access to eastbound US 10 via Bus. US 10, which US 127 crosses just south of the Clare County line. North of this line, US 10 and US 127 meet at a directional interchange. Traffic from westbound US 10 defaults onto northbound US 127, and traffic from the southbound freeway can exit onto eastbound US 10; no other direct connections are provided between the two freeways, requiring the use of the business loops through downtown to make the missing connections. The freeway rounds Lake Shamrock north of downtown and intersects the joint northern end of two business loops. There is a welcome center in the median of US 127/US 10 before the two highways separate north of the city.

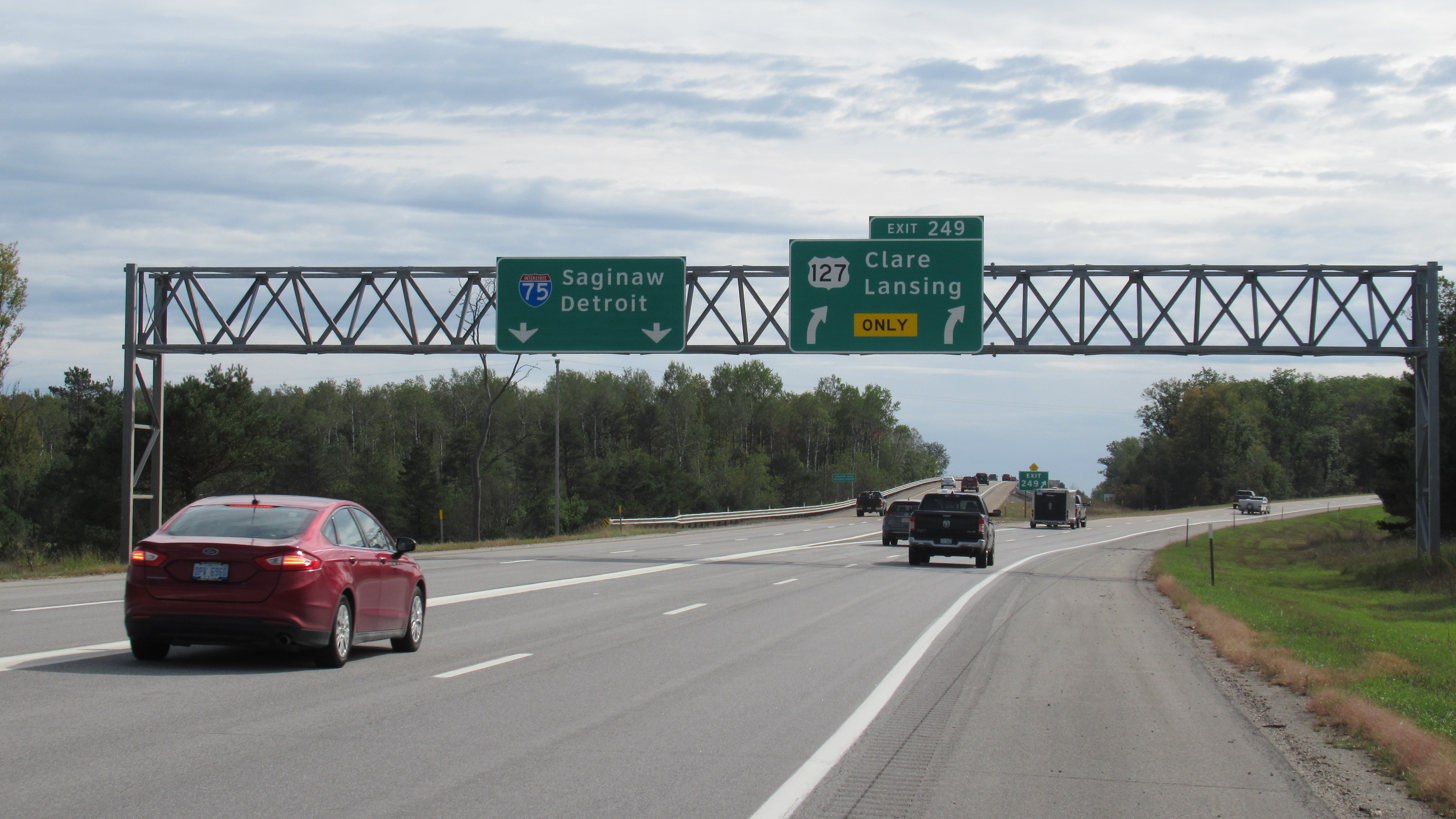
Southbound beginning of US 127 in Beaver Creek Township

US 127 continues northward through rural woodlands in Clare County to the community of Harrison. There is another Bus. US 127 for the community, part of which is also M-61. The freeway passes between Little Long and Sutherland lakes north of Harrison before intersecting the northern end of the business loop. US 127 serves the resort area at Houghton Lake in Roscommon County. It crosses the Muskegon River on the west side of Houghton Lake before running along the western side of Higgins Lake near the Crawford County line. US 127 ends about four miles (6.4 km) south of Grayling at a partial interchange with I-75. Traffic along US 127 northbound has access to northbound I-75 and southbound traffic on I-75 can access US 127 southbound.

== History ==
In 1919, the Michigan State Highway Department (MSHD) (Note: The Michigan State Highway Department was reorganized into the Michigan Department of State Highways and Transportation on August 23, 1973. The name was shortened to its current form in 1978.) signposted the highway system for the first time, At the time, the original M-14 designation was assigned from the Ohio state line northward through Jackson, Lansing, Mount Pleasant, Clare, and Grayling. The highway also continued from Grayling northward through Gaylord to Cheboygan. Seven years later, the United States Numbered Highway System was created on November 11, 1926, and in Michigan's initial assignments, US 27 replaced M-14 between Lansing and Cheboygan, while US 127 ran from Lansing southward through Jackson to the Somerset area where it turned southeasterly, replacing the former M-80 and M-34 through Adrian to Toledo, Ohio. The remainder of M-14 south to the state line remained a shortened M-14.

The southern end of US 127 was rerouted in 1930 from Somerset south to Hudson and on to Cincinnati, Ohio. The section of former US 127 between Somerset and Toledo became US 223. The northern end was shifted slightly in 1950 in the city of Lansing when US 27 was rerouted from its car-only route to its truck route and US 127 was realigned to connect to the new routing.

The city of Mason was bypassed in 1954. The former route through town was designated Bus. US 127 at the time. The US 127 expressway was first started in 1957 with an extension south of Mason to Leslie. A further extension to Jackson was opened in 1958. By 1960, Jackson was bypassed to the east and the former route through downtown was redesignated Bus. US 127. Over the next few years, the expressway was upgraded to a full freeway that was completed in by 1964. The US 127 freeway was extended north to the Lansing area by 1968. Near Lansing, it was routed along I-496 to the north side of Lansing and East Lansing to connect with US 27. The last extension of US 127 for another 11 years was completed in 1973 when the freeway was completed north to the DeWitt area, connecting with US 27 there.

Two changes took place in the routing of US 127 in the 1980s as the I-69 freeway was completed. The northern Lansing bypass was completed in 1984, and I-69 was built through Clinton County in 1987. These changes routed I-69 along a portion of US 127 near DeWitt and removed a Temporary I-69 routing from US 127 on the east side of Lansing. The opening of the St. Johns Bypass on August 31, 1998, shortened US 127 by almost two miles (3.2 km) while US 27 was routed along the I-69 freeway between exits 87 and 89 to connect with the new freeway northward. US 127 ended at its junction with I-69 and US 27 and no longer ran concurrently with I-69 afterward.

MDOT petitioned the American Association of State Highway and Transportation Officials (AASHTO) for approval to remove US 27 from Michigan in 1999. This proposed change was to remove the 88-mile (142 km) concurrency of I-69 and US 27 southwest of the Lansing area. MDOT also proposed that US 127 be extended north over the former US 27 to Grayling. AASHTO approved this change on April 16, 1999, nearly tripling the highway from 83 to 214 miles (134 to 344 km). The highway markers were changed over in 2002, converting US 27 and the Bus. US 27 designations to US 127 and Bus. US 127, respectively.

In 2009, MDOT constructed Michigan lefts at several intersections in northern Clinton County to remove cross-street traffic. In April 2010, the department raised speed limits for passenger cars on this non-freeway stretch to 65 miles per hour (105 km/h) from the previous 55 miles per hour (89 km/h).

In 2017, some speed limits in Michigan for passenger cars were increased from 70 to 75 miles per hour (113 to 121 km/h), and the speed limit for trucks was increased from 60 to 65 miles per hour (97 to 105 km/h). In turn, the expressway section of US 127 had a speed limit increase to 65 miles per hour (105 km/h) for trucks (matching passenger car speed limits), and all freeway sections north of the I-69 interchange have a speed limit of 75 miles per hour (121 km/h) (for passenger cars) now.

== Future ==
Marker for Future I-73

As originally defined in 1991, the alignment of I-73 in Michigan would have run along I-75 to Detroit. However, the definition was amended in 1995 to include a branch along the US 223 corridor to south of Jackson and the US 127 corridor north to I-75 near Grayling. From Grayling northward, the I-73 corridor would follow I-75 to Sault Ste. Marie. Except south of Jackson, where it is a two-lane road and a section of road north of Lansing where the freeway reverts to a divided highway, this is mostly a rural four-lane freeway. While there are no immediate plans to convert the section between St. Johns and Ithaca to freeway, MDOT continues to purchase parcels for right-of-way to be used for future upgrades.

MDOT included using the US 127 and US 223 corridors as one of its three options to build I-73 in 2000. The others included using the US 127 corridor all the way into Ohio with a connection to the Ohio Turnpike or using US 127 south and a new freeway connection to US 223 at Adrian. MDOT abandoned further study of I-73 after June 12, 2001, diverting remaining funding to safety improvement projects along the corridor. The department stated there was a "lack of need" for sections of the proposed freeway, and the project website was closed down in 2002. According to press reports in 2011, a group advocating on behalf of the freeway is working to revive the I-73 project in Michigan. According to an MDOT spokesman, "to my knowledge, we're not taking that issue up again." The Lenawee County Road Commission is not interested in the freeway, and according to the president of the Adrian Area Chamber of Commerce, "there seems to be little chance of having an I-73 link between Toledo and Jackson built in the foreseeable future."

== Exit list ==
County	Location	mi	km	Exit	Destinations	Notes
Hillsdale–Lenawee county line	Wright–Medina township line	0.000	0.000		US 127 south – Bryan	Ohio state line
Hillsdale–Lenawee county line	Pittsford Township–Hudson line	10.245	16.488		M-34 – Hillsdale, Adrian	
Hillsdale	No major junctions					
Lenawee	Woodstock Township	23.191	37.322		US 223 south – Adrian, Toledo	Northern terminus of US 223
Lenawee	Woodstock Township	24.055	38.713		US 12 – Coldwater, Ypsilanti	
Hillsdale	No major junctions					
Jackson	Summit Township	33.975	54.677	Southern end of freeway		
Jackson	Summit Township	34.379	55.328	34	Bus. US 127 north / M-50 – Jackson, Monroe	Northbound exit and southbound entrance for westbound M-50/Bus. US 127 only, and complete access to McDevitt Avenue/M-50 east; eastbound M-50 is briefly concurrent with southbound US 127 but westbound M-50 follows a ramp
Jackson	Leoni Township	36.229	58.305	36	South Street	
Jackson	Leoni Township	37.531	60.400	38	Page Avenue – Michigan Center	
Jackson	Leoni Township	38.771	62.396	39	BL I-94 (Michigan Avenue)	
Jackson	Leoni Township	40.100– 40.110	64.535– 64.551	40	I-94 east – Detroit	Eastern end of I-94 concurrency; freeway uses I-94 exit numbers, signed as exit 142 southbound
Jackson	Blackman Township	41.435	66.683	141	Elm Avenue	
Jackson	Blackman Township	42.460	68.333	139	M-106 (Cooper Street) – Stockbridge	
Jackson	Blackman Township	43.660	70.264	138	I-94 west – Chicago Bus. US 127 south / M-50 east – Jackson	Western end of I-94 concurrency; southern end of M-50 concurrency; signed as exits 43A (east) and 43B (west) southbound
Jackson	Blackman Township	44.169	71.083	44	Springport Road	
Jackson	Blackman Township	45.041	72.486	45	Parnall Road	Southbound interchange provides access to westbound M-50 via Clinton Way
Jackson	Blackman Township	45.425	73.104	46	M-50 west – Eaton Rapids, Charlotte	Northern end of M-50 concurrency; northbound exit and southbound entrance
Jackson	Rives Township	51.124	82.276	51	Berry Road – Rives Junction	
Ingham	Leslie	56.290	90.590	56	Bellevue Road – Leslie	
Ingham	Vevay Township	61.322	98.688	61	Barnes Road	
Ingham	Mason	64.430	103.690	64	Kipp Road – Mason	
Ingham	Vevay Township	66.326	106.741	66	M-36 east (Cedar Street) – Mason	Western terminus of M-36
Ingham	Alaiedon Township	69.761	112.269	70	Holt Road – Holt	
Ingham	Delhi Township	72.855– 72.922	117.249– 117.357	73	I-96 – Grand Rapids, Detroit I-496 west	Southern end of I-496 concurrency; signed as exits 73A (I-96 east, Detroit) and 73B (I-96 west, Grand Rapids); concurrency uses I-496 exit numbers
Ingham	Lansing	73.953	119.016	11	Dunckel Road, Jolly Road	
Ingham	Lansing	76.103	122.476	9	Trowbridge Road	Signed as exit 75 on southbound US 127
Ingham	Lansing	76.876	123.720	8	I-496 west – Downtown Lansing	Northern end of I-496 concurrency; signed as exit 77 southbound
Ingham	Lansing	76.876	123.720	76	Kalamazoo Street, Michigan Avenue	Northbound exit and southbound entrance; southbound exit and northbound entrance via exit 78
Ingham	Lansing	77.683– 77.734	125.019– 125.101	78	BL I-69 / M-43 (Grand River Avenue, Saginaw Street)	
Ingham	East Lansing	79.029	127.185	79	Lake Lansing Road	
Clinton	DeWitt Township	82.229– 82.259	132.335– 132.383	82	I-69 to I-96 – Flint, Grand Rapids	Signed as exits 82A (I-69 east, Flint) and 82B (I-69 west to I-96, Grand Rapids)
Clinton	DeWitt–Olive township line	85.750	138.001	86	Round Lake Road – DeWitt	
Clinton	Olive Township	90.760	146.064	91	Bus. US 127 north (Price Road)	Signed only as Price Road southbound
Clinton	Bingham Township	95.780	154.143	96	M-21 – St. Johns, Owosso	
Clinton	Bingham Township	99.230	159.695	99	Bus. US 127 south (Old 27) – St. Johns	Signed only as Old 27 northbound
Clinton	Greenbush Township	100.115	161.119	Northern end of freeway; southern end of expressway		
Gratiot	Washington Township	109.365	176.006	109	M-57 (Cleveland Road) – Greenville, Chesaning	
Gratiot	North Star Township	115.733	186.254		Bagley Road north	Northern end of expressway; southern end of freeway; intersection closed in 2018
Gratiot	Ithaca	117.690	189.404	117	Bus. US 127 north (Washington Road) – Ithaca	Signed only as Washington Road southbound
Gratiot	Emerson Township	119.001	191.514	119	Bus. US 127 south (Polk Road) – Ithaca	Signed only as Polk Road northbound
Gratiot	Emerson–Bethany township line	123.026	197.991	123	Bus. US 127 north (Lincoln Road) – Alma	Northbound exit and southbound entrance; southern terminus of business loop through Alma
Gratiot	Bethany–Pine River township line	123.346	198.506	124	Bus. US 127 north (State Road) – St. Louis	Southern terminus of business loop through St. Louis; signed only as State Road southbound; access from northbound State Road to southbound US 127 and northbound US 127 to southbound State Road at exit 123
Gratiot	Pine River Township	125.616	202.159	127A	Bus. US 127 south / M-46 – St. Louis, Saginaw, Edmore	Northern terminus of business loop for St. Louis; signed as exit 127 (M-46, Edmore, Saginaw) northbound; access from eastbound M-46 to northbound US 127 and southbound US 127 to westbound M-46 at exit 127B
Gratiot	Pine River Township	126.986	204.364	127B	Bus. US 127 south (Alger Road) / M-46 west – Alma, Edmore	Southbound exit and northbound entrance; northern terminus of business loop for Alma
Isabella	Coe Township	134.997	217.257	135	Blanchard Road – Shepherd	
Isabella	Union Township	139.270	224.133	139	Bus. US 127 north – Mount Pleasant	Northbound exit and southbound entrance
Isabella	Union Township	142.686	229.631	143	M-20 (Pickard Street) – Big Rapids, Midland	
Isabella	Union Township	144.123	231.943	144	Bus. US 127 south – Mount Pleasant	Southbound exit and northbound entrance
Isabella	Rosebush	149.222	240.150	149	Rosebush	Connects to Rosebush Road
Isabella	Vernon Township	156.131	251.268	156	Bus. US 127 north to US 10 east – Clare	Northbound exit and southbound entrance; access to eastbound US 10 via Bus. US 10
Clare	Clare	158.041– 158.285	254.342– 254.735	158	US 10 east – Midland	Southern end of US 10 concurrency; southbound exit and northbound entrance
Clare	Clare	159.760	257.109	160	Bus. US 127 south / Bus. US 10 east – Clare	Signed as Old 27 only northbound
Clare	Clare	159.884– 160.562	257.308– 258.399	Michigan Welcome Center		
Clare	Clare	162.342	261.264	162	US 10 west to M-115 – Ludington, Cadillac	Northern end of US 10 concurrency
Clare	Hatton Township	167.803	270.053	168	Mannsiding Road – Lake George	
Clare	Hayes Township	170.174	273.869	170	Bus. US 127 north / M-61 – Harrison, Gladwin	Signed as M-61 only southbound
Clare	Hayes Township	176.135	283.462	176	Bus. US 127 south – Harrison	Signed as Old 27 only northbound
Roscommon	Roscommon Township	189.912	305.634	189	Snow Bowl Road	
Roscommon	Houghton Lake Heights	194.528	313.062	194	M-55 – Cadillac, Houghton Lake	Signed as exits 194A (east) and 194B (west) southbound
Roscommon	Lyon Township	201.569	324.394	201	Higgins Lake Road	
Crawford	Beaver Creek Township	206.249	331.926	206	Military Road – Camp Grayling, Roscommon	Signed only as Military Road southbound
Crawford	Beaver Creek Township	211.692– 212.168	340.685– 341.451	—	I-75 north – Mackinac Bridge	Northbound exit to I-75 northbound and southbound entrance from I-75 southbound; exit 249 on I-75
1.000 mi = 1.609 km; 1.000 km = 0.621 mi: Closed/former; Concurrency terminus; Incomplete access

== Notes ==
U.S. Route 127
Previous state: Ohio	Michigan	Next state: Terminus
