= Whittemore-Prescott Area Schools =

School district in Michigan, United States

Address
- 8970 Prescott Road Whittemore, Iosco County, Michigan, 48770; United States

District information
- Grades: Kindergarten–12
- Schools: 2
- Budget: $11,488,000 2022–2023 expenditures
- NCES District ID: 2636390

Students and staff
- Students: 607 (2024–2025)
- Teachers: 37.89 (on an FTE basis) (2024–2025)
- Staff: 93.91 FTE (2024–2025)
- Student–teacher ratio: 16.02 (2024–2025)
- District mascot: Cardinals

Other information
- Website: www.wpas.net

Whittemore-Prescott Area Schools is a public school district in Northern Michigan. In Iosco County, it serves Whittemore, Burleigh Township, and parts of the townships of Reno and Sherman. In Arenac County, it serves parts of Clayton and Mason townships. In Ogemaw County, it serves Prescott, Skidway Lake, and parts of the townships of Logan, Mills, and Richland.

== History ==
In 1957, nine independent school districts in the Whittemore area consolidated, raising the need for a larger high school. Whittemore High School was the only full high school in the consolidated area, and students from the area's small elementary schools often attended high school elsewhere. Voters approved a bond issue for the new high school in August 1957, and building contracts were finalized in May 1958 for a fall 1959 opening.

In 1996, voters passed a bond issue to build the current elementary school. The issue passed by one vote, and included the renovation of the high school and converting the existing elementary school to a school for grades seven and eight. Currently, the junior high and high school share a building.

== Schools ==
Schools in Whittemore-Prescott Area Schools share a campus on Mills Road west of Whittemore.

Schools in Whittemore-Prescott Area Schools district
School	Address	Notes
Whittemore-Prescott Junior/Senior High School	6001 Mills Road, Whittemore	Grades 7–12
Whittemore-Prescott Elementary	8878 Prescott Road, Whittemore	Grades K-6
