= Whatmore =

Whatmore is a surname. Notable people with the surname include:

- A. R. Whatmore (1889–1960), British actor, playwright and producer of plays
- Dav Whatmore (born 1954), former international cricketer who represented Australia
- Ernie Whatmore (1900–1991), professional association footballer
- Neil Whatmore (born 1955), English former footballer who played as a striker
- Rachel Whatmore, fictional solicitor in the UK soap opera Emmerdale
- Sarah Whatmore (born 1981), English singer, best known from the British TV series Pop Idol
- Sarah Whatmore (geographer) (born 1959), Professor of Environment and Public Policy at Oxford University

== See also ==
- Whatmore (band)
- Watmore (surname)
- Wetmore (disambiguation)
- Whitmore (disambiguation)
- Whittemore (disambiguation)
