= Witmer =

Witmer may refer to:

- Witmer, Pennsylvania, a census-designated place
- Witmer Lake, a lake in Indiana

== People with the given name ==
- Witmer Stone (1866–1939), American ornithologist, botanist, and mammalogist

== People with the surname ==
- Charles B. Witmer (1862–1925), U.S. federal judge
- Denison Witmer, American songwriter
- Elizabeth Witmer (born 1946), Canadian politician
- Jill Witmer (born 1991), American field hockey player
- John Witmer (1951–2004), Canadian musician
- Lawrence Witmer (born 1959), American paleontologist and paleobiologist
- Lightner Witmer (1867–1956), American psychologist
- Tamara Witmer (born 1984), American model and actor

== See also ==
- Witmer v. United States, a 1955 Supreme Court case
- Whitmer (disambiguation)
- Wittmar, Lower Saxony, Germany
- Wittmer, a surname
