= Mills Township, Ogemaw County, Michigan =

Mills Township, Michigan
- Civil township
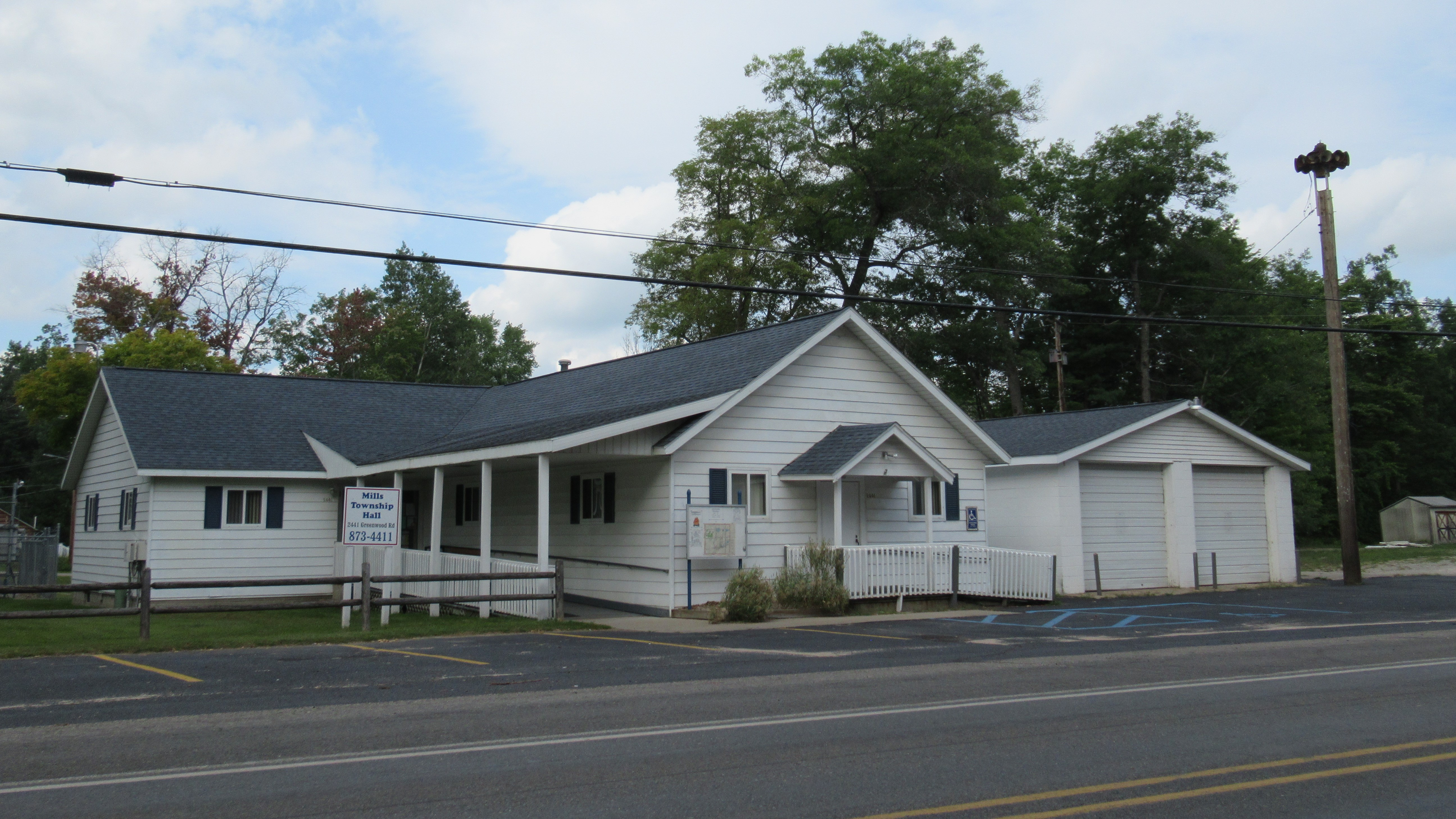
- Mills Township Hall in Skidway Lake

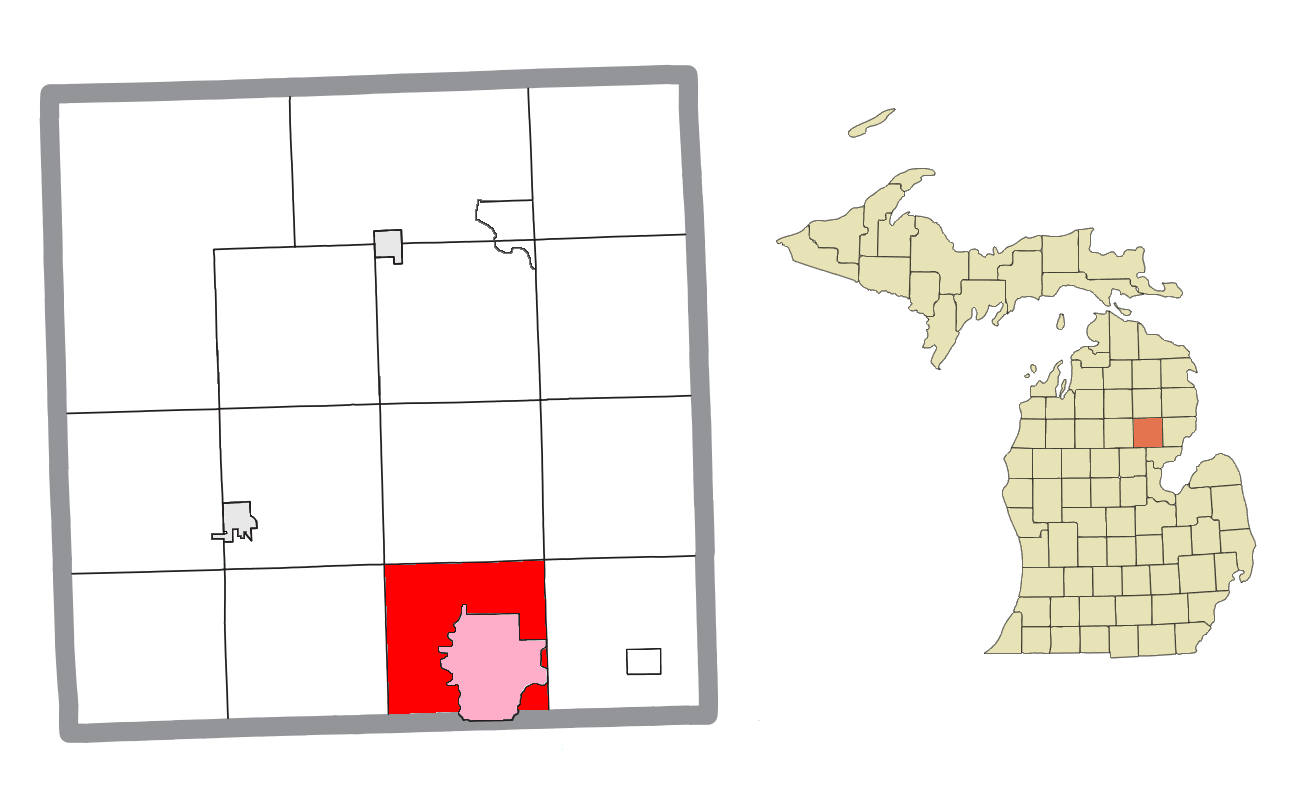
- Location within Ogemaw County (red) and the administered CDP of Skidway Lake (pink)

- Location within the state of Michigan Location within the United States
- Coordinates: 44°12′21″N 84°03′45″W
- Country: United States
- State: Michigan
- County: Ogemaw

Government
  - Supervisor: David Ryan
  - Clerk: April Schils

Area
  - Total: 35.57 sq mi (92.13 km^{2})
  - Land: 34.22 sq mi (88.63 km^{2})
  - Water: 1.35 sq mi (3.50 km^{2})
- Elevation: 810 ft (247 m)

Population (2020)
  - Total: 3,973
  - Density: 116.1/sq mi (44.83/km^{2})
- Time zone: UTC-5 (Eastern (EST))
  - Summer (DST): UTC-4 (EDT)
- ZIP code(s): 48610 (Alger); 48661 (West Branch); 48756 (Prescott)
- Area code: 989
- FIPS code: 26-54340
- GNIS feature ID: 1626746
- Website: https://millstwpogemawmi.gov/

Mills Township is a civil township of Ogemaw County in the U.S. state of Michigan. The population was 3,973 at the 2020 census, making it the county's most populated municipality.

== Communities ==
- Elbow Lake is an unincorporated community located along Elbow Lake at 44°12′55″N 84°02′08″W.
- Skidway Lake is an unincorporated community and census-designated place that occupies that southeast portion of the township centered at 44°11′00″N 84°02′07″W. Skidway Lake contained its own summer post office from 1959 to 1962 and again from 1963 to 1999.

== Geography ==
According to the U.S. Census Bureau, the township has a total area of 35.57 square miles (92.13 km^{2}), of which 34.22 square miles (88.63 km^{2}) is land and 1.35 square miles (3.50 km^{2}) (3.80%) is water.

== Demographics ==
As of the census of 2000, there were 4,005 people, 1,705 households, and 1,159 families residing in the township. The population density was 116.3 inhabitants per square mile (44.9/km^{2}). There were 3,385 housing units at an average density of 98.3 per square mile (38.0/km^{2}). The racial makeup of the township was 96.13% White, 0.27% African American, 1.52% Native American, 0.05% from other races, and 2.02% from two or more races. Hispanic or Latino of any race were 1.25% of the population.

There were 1,705 households, out of which 23.8% had children under the age of 18 living with them, 52.0% were married couples living together, 10.8% had a female householder with no husband present, and 32.0% were non-families. 26.4% of all households were made up of individuals, and 12.9% had someone living alone who was 65 years of age or older. The average household size was 2.35 and the average family size was 2.79.

In the township the population was spread out, with 21.3% under the age of 18, 6.8% from 18 to 24, 23.8% from 25 to 44, 28.4% from 45 to 64, and 19.7% who were 65 years of age or older. The median age was 44 years. For every 100 females, there were 102.5 males. For every 100 females age 18 and over, there were 98.9 males.

The median income for a household in the township was $21,703, and the median income for a family was $26,050. Males had a median income of $26,223 versus $16,993 for females. The per capita income for the township was $12,355. About 17.4% of families and 21.6% of the population were below the poverty line, including 26.7% of those under age 18 and 13.6% of those age 65 or over.
