= Whitmer =

Whitmer may refer to:

- Whitmer Peninsula, a peninsula on the coast of Victoria Land, Antarctica
- Whitmer High School, in Toledo, Ohio, United States
- Whitmer, West Virginia, a census-designated place in Randolph County, West Virginia, United States

== People with the surname ==
- B. J. Whitmer (born 1978), American professional wrestler
- Chandler Whitmer (born 1991), American football player and coach
- Christian Whitmer (1798–1835), son of Peter Whitmer, Sr. and Mary Musselman
- Dan Whitmer (born 1955), professional baseball player and coach
- David Whitmer (1805–1888), early adherent of the Latter Day Saint movement, Witness to the Book of Mormon's golden plates
- Gretchen Whitmer (born 1971), Governor of Michigan
- Jacob Whitmer (1800–1856), son of Peter Whitmer, Sr. and Mary Musselman
- John Whitmer (1802–1878), early leader in the Latter Day Saint movement
- Mary Mussleman Whitmer (1778–1856), Book of Mormon witness and the wife of Peter Whitmer, Sr.
- Peter Whitmer Sr. (1773–1854), early member of the Latter Day Saint movement
- Peter Whitmer Jr. (1809–1836), son of Peter Whitmer, Sr. and Witnesses of the Book of Mormon

== See also ==
- Witmer (disambiguation)
- Whitmore (disambiguation)
- Wittmar, Lower Saxony, Germany
- Wittmer, a surname
- John Whitmer Historical Association (JWHA), a nonprofit organization promoting study of the LDS movement
- Peter Whitmer log home, historic site located in Fayette, New York, United States
