= Whittemore =

Whittemore may refer to:

- Whittemore (surname)
- Whittemore, Iowa, United States
- Whittemore, Michigan, United States
