= Whitmore (surname) =

Whitmore is a surname. Notable people with the surname include:

- Alex Whitmore (born 1995), English footballer
- Alfred Whitmore (1876–1946), English pathologist
- Cam Whitmore (born 2004), American basketball player
- Derek Whitmore (born 1984), American hockey player
- Ed Whitmore, British screenwriter
- Elias Whitmore (1772–1853), US congressman from New York
- Ellen Whitmore (1828–1861), American educator and missionary
- Charles Algernon Whitmore (1851–1908), British Conservative Member of Parliament (MP) for Chelsea 1886–1906
- Frank C. Whitmore (1887–1947), American chemist
- Frances Whitmore (1666–1695), English aristocrat
- Francis Whitmore (1872–1962), English soldier
- James Whitmore (1921–2009), American actor
- James Whitmore Jr. (born 1948), American actor
- Joan S. Whitmore (1922–2002), South African hydrologist specialising in agriculture and water
- John Whitmore (surfer) (1929–2001), South African surfing pioneer
- Keith Bernard Whitmore, American Episcopalian bishop
- Kelsie Whitmore (born 1998), American baseball player
- Laura Whitmore (born 1985), Irish TV presenter
- Lady Lucy Whitmore (1792–1840), English noblewoman, hymnwriter
- Mary Whitmore (1884–1974), first woman to be Mayor of Ipswich, Suffolk, England
- Tamika Whitmore (born 1977), American basketball player
- Theodore Whitmore (born 1972), Jamaican footballer
- William Wolryche-Whitmore (1787–1858), British MP remembered for introducing South Australia Colonisation Act

== See also ==
- Hugh Whitemore (born 1936), English playwright and screenwriter
- Michael Witmore (born 1967), American Shakespeare scholar
- Whittemore (surname)
