= Whitmore =

Whitmore may refer to:

== Places ==
- Whitmore, Staffordshire, England
  - Whitmore Hall
  - Whitmore railway station
- Whitmore, California, U.S.
- Whitmore, Ohio, U.S.
- Whitmore Township, Macon County, Illinois, U.S.
- Whitmore Village, Hawaii, U.S.
- Whitmore Lake, Michigan, U.S.
- Whitmore Mountains, Antarctica

== Other uses ==
- Whitmore (horse), American thoroughbred racehorse
- Whitmore (surname), including a list of people with the name
- Whitmore baronets, two baronetcies
- Whitmore High School, Harrow, England
- Whitmore High School, Barry, Wales
- Whitmore Stakes, American thoroughbred stakes race
- SC Whitmore School, South Carolina, U.S., a virtual school

== See also ==
- Melioidosis, or Whitmore's disease
