= Moffatt Township, Michigan =

- Civil township
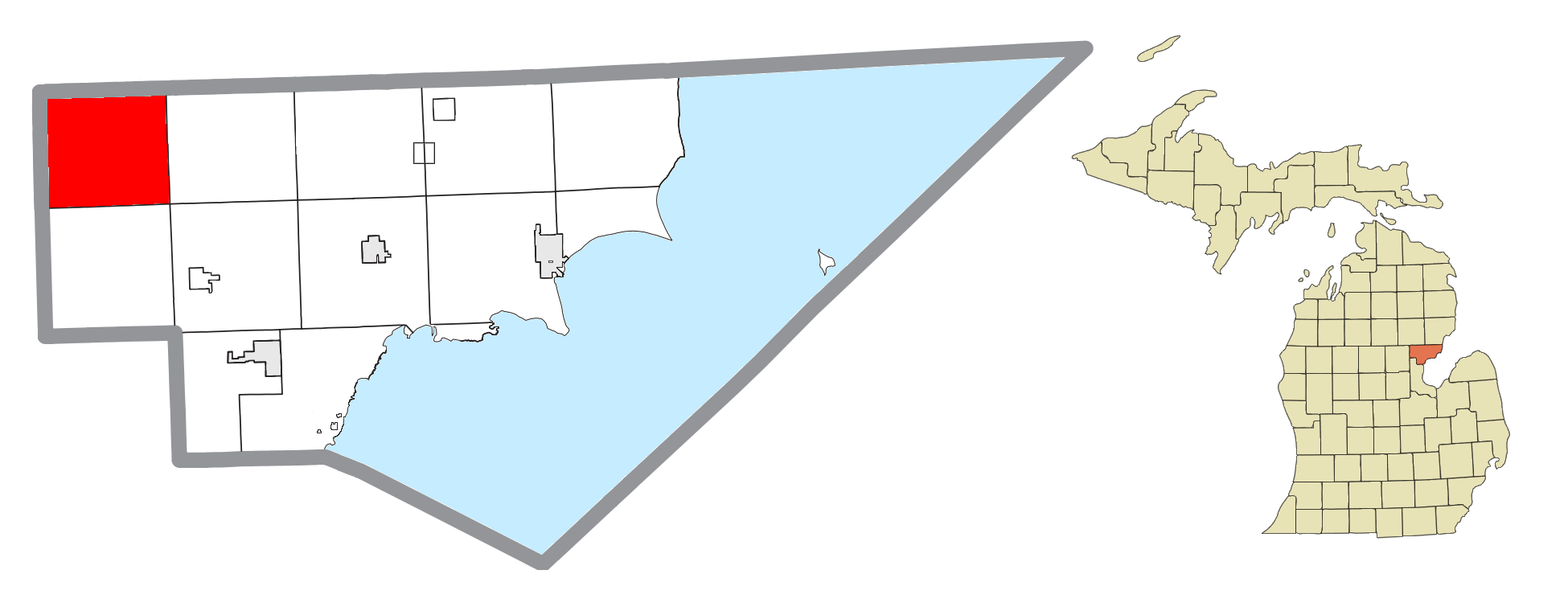
- Location within Arenac County

- Location within the state of Michigan Moffatt Township (the United States)
- Coordinates: 44°06′38″N 84°05′14″W
- Country: United States
- State: Michigan
- County: Arenac

Government
  - Supervisor: Thomas Spencer

Area
  - Total: 32.1 sq mi (83.1 km^{2})
  - Land: 31.5 sq mi (81.6 km^{2})
  - Water: 0.58 sq mi (1.5 km^{2})
- Elevation: 768 ft (234 m)

Population (2020)
  - Total: 1,166
  - Density: 37.0/sq mi (14.3/km^{2})
- Time zone: UTC-5 (Eastern (EST))
  - Summer (DST): UTC-4 (EDT)
- ZIP code(s): 48610, 48659
- Area code: 989
- FIPS code: 26-54800
- GNIS feature ID: 1626751
- Website: Official website

Moffatt Township is a civil township of Arenac County in the U.S. state of Michigan. The population was 1,166 at the 2020 census.

== Communities ==
- Alger is an unincorporated community at 44°07′32″N 84°07′16″W, situated on exit 202 off I-75 at the junction with M-33. The ZIP code is 48610. Alger was established in 1883 as a railway junction.
- Forest Lake is a small community around the reservoir named Forest Lake on the east-central part of the township. The lake is formed by a dam on Wells Creek. Water from Forest Lake is released into the Rifle River.

== History ==
Moffatt Township was organized in 1874, at the time part of Bay County. The community of Alger was named after Russell A. Alger almost a decade later. In 1882 to 1883, the area of Alger was created from the formation of a railroad junction along the Michigan Central Railroad. This junction came from the now defunct Bay City and Alpena Railroad out of Prescott, Michigan. It was constructed under the direction of Russell Alger, who later became the 20th governor of Michigan, and then the U.S. Secretary of War. The railroads were thriving mainly due to Michigan's lumbering boom at the time, and Alger grew to be a popular settlement with many mills, restaurants, and saloons. Two small towns named Culver and Wells existed nearby. Culver was located about a mile north, and Wells was about a mile south of downtown Alger.

In 1896 the railroad from Prescott ceased operations, and into the early 1900s (decade), as the timber reached depletion, the logging railroads disappeared along with businesses. Today, Wells and Culver no longer exist, and Alger has slowly downsized to a small community of approximately 1,000 people.

== Geography ==
According to the United States Census Bureau, the township has a total area of 32.1 square miles (83.1 km^{2}), of which 31.5 square miles (81.6 km^{2}) is land and 0.58 square miles (1.5 km^{2}), or 1.83%, is water.

== Demographics ==
As of the census of 2000, there were 1,121 people, 484 households, and 327 families residing in the township. The population density was 35.4 inhabitants per square mile (13.7/km^{2}). There were 862 housing units at an average density of 27.2 per square mile (10.5/km^{2}). The racial makeup of the township was 97.86% White, 0.62% Native American, 0.27% Asian, and 1.25% from two or more races. Hispanic or Latino of any race were 0.80% of the population.

There were 484 households, out of which 24.0% had children under the age of 18 living with them, 58.3% were married couples living together, 6.6% had a female householder with no husband present, and 32.4% were non-families. 28.3% of all households were made up of individuals, and 14.7% had someone living alone who was 65 years of age or older. The average household size was 2.27 and the average family size was 2.75.

In the township the population was spread out, with 21.1% under the age of 18, 6.4% from 18 to 24, 23.1% from 25 to 44, 28.3% from 45 to 64, and 21.1% who were 65 years of age or older. The median age was 44 years. For every 100 females, there were 98.4 males. For every 100 females age 18 and over, there were 95.4 males.

The median income for a household in the township was $32,250, and the median income for a family was $40,724. Males had a median income of $35,769 versus $17,917 for females. The per capita income for the township was $16,058. About 5.7% of families and 9.5% of the population were below the poverty line, including 9.0% of those under age 18 and 5.9% of those age 65 or over.

According to the census of 2010, the population grew 5.6% to 1,184 people, 514 households, and 354 residing families and the median income for a household in the township was $39,318.

== Organization camps ==
Cole Canoe Base is a nearby camp for the Boy Scouts of America. It is located on East Greenwood Road, a few miles from the Skidway Lake and Prescott area.
