= Watmore =

Watmore is a surname. Notable people with the surname include:

- Duncan Watmore (born 1994), English footballer
- Ian Watmore (born 1958), British management consultant
- Joanne Watmore (born 1986), British rugby union player

== See also ==
- Whatmore (surname)
