= Wittmer =

Family name

Wittmer is a surname. Notable people with the surname include:

- Albert Wittmer (1897–1950), American football and basketball player, lawyer, and state legislator
- Jeffrey Wittmer (born 1984), American weightlifter
- Kuno Wittmer (born 1982), Canadian racing driver
- Phil Wittmer, American information technology specialist

== See also ==
- William A. Wittmer Lustron House
- Whitmer (disambiguation)
