= Alger, Michigan =

Unincorporated community in Michigan, United States

- Unincorporated community
- Location within Michigan Location within the United States
- Coordinates: 44.1256°N 84.1211°W
- Country: United States
- State: Michigan
- County: Arenac
- Township: Moffatt
- Settled: 1883
- Elevation: 784 ft (239 m)
- Time zone: UTC-5 (Eastern (EST))
  - Summer (DST): UTC-4 (EDT)
- ZIP code(s): 48610
- Area code: 989
- GNIS feature ID: 619941

Alger (/ˌældʒər/ AL-jər) is an unincorporated community in Arenac County in the U.S. state of Michigan. The community is located within Moffatt Township. As an unincorporated community, Alger has no legally defined boundaries or population statistics of its own but does have its own post office with the 48610 ZIP Code.

== History ==
Alger was established in 1883 as a station at the junction between the Michigan Central and Detroit, Bay City & Alpena railroads. A post office opened in the settlement on March 7, 1884. The settlement was platted in 1884 by John Stoughton Newberry and Russell A. Alger, the latter the namesake of the community and later the 20th Governor of Michigan.

== Geography ==
Alger is located in the northwest of Arenac County, in Moffatt Township. The community is located in the northern Lower Peninsula of Michigan.

=== Major highways ===
- I-75 is a major north–south freeway that passes the community to the west.
- M-33 is a north–south state trunkline highway with its southern terminus at I-75 immediately northwest of the community.
