= Skidway Lake, Michigan =

- Census-designated place (CDP) & unincorporated community
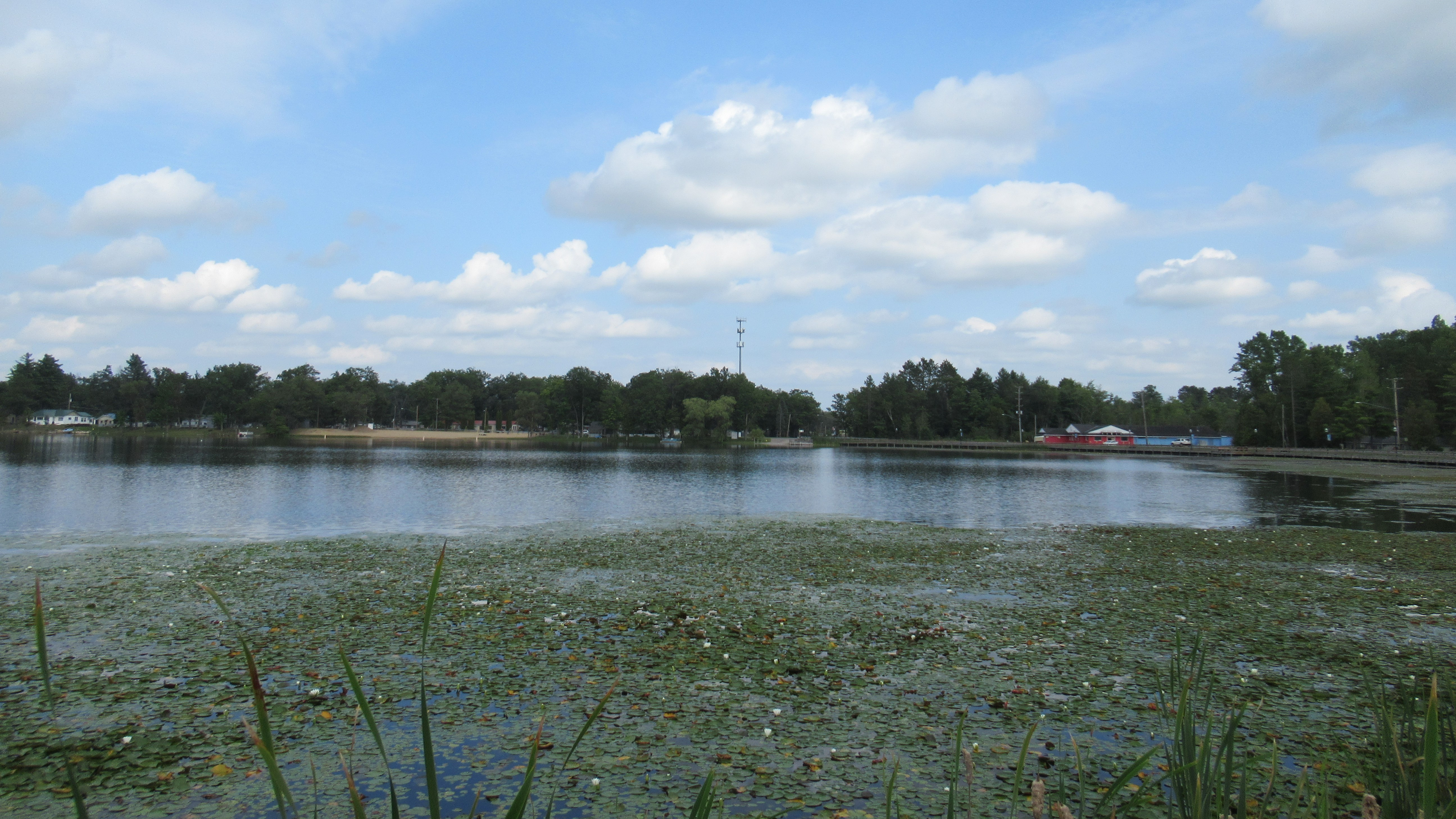
- Skidway Lake along Greenwood Road

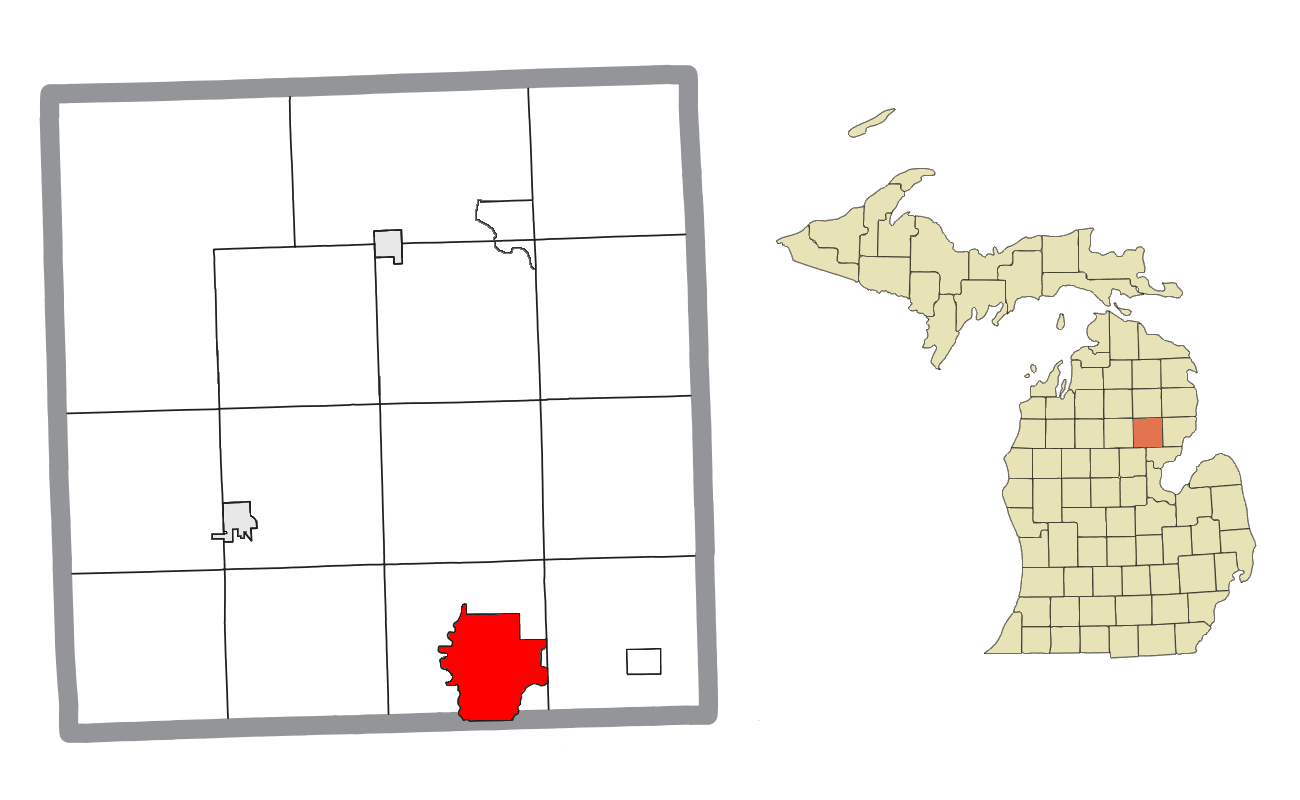
- Location within Ogemaw County

- Location within the state of Michigan Location within the United States
- Coordinates: 44°11′00″N 84°02′07″W
- Country: United States
- State: Michigan
- County: Ogemaw
- Township: Mills

Area
  - Total: 11.78 sq mi (30.52 km^{2})
  - Land: 11.29 sq mi (29.24 km^{2})
  - Water: 0.49 sq mi (1.28 km^{2})
- Elevation: 797 ft (243 m)

Population (2020)
  - Total: 3,082
  - Density: 273.0/sq mi (105.39/km^{2})
- Time zone: UTC-5 (Eastern (EST))
  - Summer (DST): UTC-4 (EDT)
- ZIP code(s): 48610 (Alger); 48756 (Prescott)
- Area code: 989
- FIPS code: 26-74200
- GNIS feature ID: 0638056

Skidway Lake is an unincorporated community and census-designated place (CDP) in Ogemaw County in the U.S. state of Michigan. The population of the CDP was 3,082 at the 2020 census, which makes it the most populated community in Ogemaw County. Skidway Lake is located within Mills Township.

== History ==
Skidway Lake had its own post office from 1959 to 1999.

== Geography ==
According to the U.S. Census Bureau, the CDP has a total area of 11.78 square miles (30.51 km^{2}), of which 11.29 square miles (29.24 km^{2}) is land and 0.49 square miles (1.27 km^{2}) (4.16%) is water.

The community takes its name from Skidway Lake, although the census-designated place contains numerous other smaller lakes including Black Lake, Bush Lake, Elbow Lake, Feeding Ground Lake, Little Feeding Ground Lake, Lost Lake, Norway Lake, and Turtle Lake. The Rifle River forms the western border of the census-designated place, while the smaller Silver Creek runs through the center of the community.

== Demographics ==
Historical population
Census	Pop.	Note	%±
2020	3,082		—
U.S. Decennial Census

=== 2020 census ===
As of the 2020 census, Skidway Lake had a population of 3,082. The median age was 46.5 years. 20.2% of residents were under the age of 18 and 20.6% of residents were 65 years of age or older. For every 100 females there were 109.5 males, and for every 100 females age 18 and over there were 109.7 males age 18 and over.

0.0% of residents lived in urban areas, while 100.0% lived in rural areas.

There were 1,346 households in Skidway Lake, of which 21.9% had children under the age of 18 living in them. Of all households, 33.9% were married-couple households, 29.7% were households with a male householder and no spouse or partner present, and 25.2% were households with a female householder and no spouse or partner present. About 35.5% of all households were made up of individuals and 16.6% had someone living alone who was 65 years of age or older.

There were 2,409 housing units, of which 44.1% were vacant. The homeowner vacancy rate was 4.3% and the rental vacancy rate was 4.5%.

Racial composition as of the 2020 census
Race	Number	Percent
White	2,835	92.0%
Black or African American	17	0.6%
American Indian and Alaska Native	16	0.5%
Asian	1	0.0%
Native Hawaiian and Other Pacific Islander	2	0.1%
Some other race	23	0.7%
Two or more races	188	6.1%
Hispanic or Latino (of any race)	61	2.0%

=== 2000 census ===
As of the census of 2000, there were 3,147 people, 1,326 households, and 883 families residing in the CDP. The population density was 277.8 inhabitants per square mile (107.3/km^{2}). There were 2,562 housing units at an average density of 226.2 per square mile (87.3/km^{2}). The racial makeup of the CDP was 95.68% White, 0.35% African American, 1.68% Native American, 0.03% from other races, and 2.26% from two or more races. Hispanic or Latino of any race were 1.43% of the population.

There were 1,326 households, out of which 25.3% had children under the age of 18 living with them, 49.0% were married couples living together, 11.8% had a female householder with no husband present, and 33.4% were non-families. 27.7% of all households were made up of individuals, and 14.1% had someone living alone who was 65 years of age or older. The average household size was 2.37 and the average family size was 2.84.

In the CDP, the population was spread out, with 22.6% under the age of 18, 7.4% from 18 to 24, 24.4% from 25 to 44, 26.6% from 45 to 64, and 19.1% who were 65 years of age or older. The median age was 42 years. For every 100 females, there were 100.7 males. For every 100 females age 18 and over, there were 97.3 males.

The median income for a household in the CDP was $20,806, and the median income for a family was $24,637. Males had a median income of $24,659 versus $15,850 for females. The per capita income for the CDP was $11,405. About 20.4% of families and 25.3% of the population were below the poverty line, including 30.0% of those under age 18 and 14.7% of those age 65 or over.
