= Vietnamese tuberculosis =

Medical condition

Vietnamese tuberculosis refers to certain forms of chronic melioidosis that look clinically very similar to tuberculosis. It is derived from the clinical appearance of the disease in American soldiers returning from the Vietnam War.
