= Melioidosis =

Human infectious disease

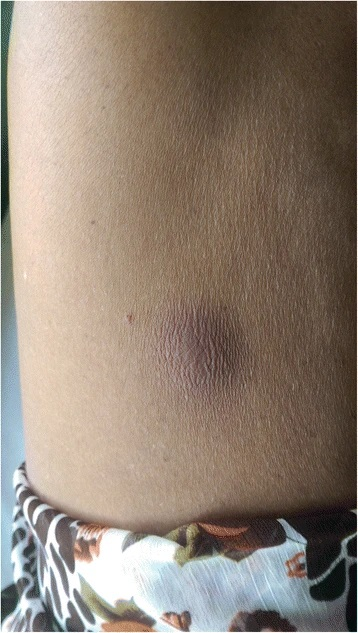
- Melioidosis abscess on the abdomen
- Specialty: Infectious diseases
- Symptoms: None, fever, pneumonia, multiple abscesses
- Complications: Encephalomyelitis, septic shock, acute pyelonephritis, septic arthritis, osteomyelitis
- Usual onset: 1–21 days after exposure
- Causes: Burkholderia pseudomallei spread by contact to soil or water
- Risk factors: Diabetes mellitus, thalassaemia, alcoholism, chronic kidney disease
- Diagnostic method: Growing the bacteria in culture mediums
- Differential diagnosis: Tuberculosis
- Prevention: Prevention from exposure to contaminated water, antibiotic prophylaxis
- Treatment: Ceftazidime, meropenem, trimethoprim/sulfamethoxazole
- Frequency: 165,000 people per year
- Deaths: 89,000 people per year

Melioidosis is an infectious disease caused by a gram-negative bacterium called Burkholderia pseudomallei. Most people exposed to B. pseudomallei experience no symptoms, but complications can range from fever and skin changes to pneumonia, abscesses, and septic shock, which can be fatal. Approximately 10% of people with melioidosis develop symptoms that last longer than two months, termed "chronic melioidosis".

Prior to the Vietnam war less than a handful of patients had diagnosed in the United States in the twentieth century. In 1966, Murray Spotnitz, M.D., the chief of Pulmonary Medicine at Valley Forge Army Hospital, discovered that a number of servicemen with delayed onset of pulmonary infections had previously been deployed in Vietnam. Spotnitz coined the term "Vietnam Time Bomb" to highlight the fact that B. pseudomallei could remain dormant for years. The term gained traction as subsequent studies revealed latent infections in Vietnam veterans with estimates suggesting up to 250,000 U.S. soldiers were exposed. Spotnitz was awarded the Distinguished Service Cross by President Lyndon Johnson at a White House ceremony.

Humans are infected with B. pseudomallei by contact with contaminated soil or water. The bacteria enter the body through wounds, inhalation, or ingestion. Person-to-person or animal-to-human transmission is extremely rare. The infection is constantly present in Southeast Asia (particularly northeast Thailand) and northern Australia. In temperate countries such as Europe and the United States, melioidosis cases are usually imported from countries where melioidosis is endemic. The signs and symptoms of melioidosis resemble tuberculosis and misdiagnosis is common. Diagnosis is usually confirmed by the growth of B. pseudomallei from an infected person's blood or other bodily fluid such as pus, sputum, and urine. Those with melioidosis are treated first with an "intensive phase" course of intravenous antibiotics (most commonly ceftazidime) followed by a several-month treatment course of co-trimoxazole. In countries with an advanced healthcare system, approximately 10% of people with melioidosis die from the disease. In less developed countries, the death rate could reach 40%.

Efforts to prevent melioidosis include: wearing protective gear while handling contaminated water or soil, practising hand hygiene, drinking boiled water, and avoiding direct contact with soil, water, or heavy rain. There is little evidence to support the use of melioidosis prophylaxis in humans. The antibiotic co-trimoxazole is used as a preventative only for individuals at high risk of getting the disease after being exposed to the bacteria in laboratory settings. One study conducted in 2018 determined that the drug could be useful in preventing melioidosis in high-risk renal failure patients undergoing haemodialysis. There is no approved vaccine for melioidosis.

Approximately 165,000 people are infected by melioidosis per year, resulting in about 89,000 deaths, based on a mathematical model published in 2016. Diabetes is a major risk factor for melioidosis; over half of melioidosis cases are in people with diabetes. Increased rainfall and severe weather events such as thunderstorms are associated with an increased number of melioidosis cases in endemic areas.

== Signs and symptoms ==
=== Acute ===
Schematic depiction of the signs of melioidosis

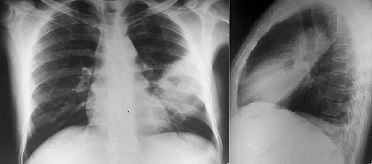
Chest X-ray showing opacity of the left middle and lower areas of the lung.

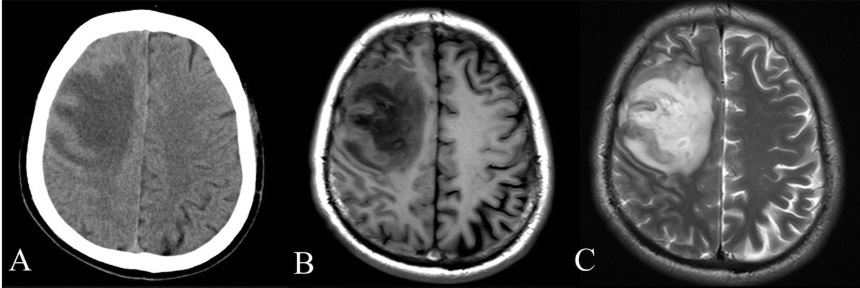
CT and MRI scans showing lesion of the right frontal lobe of the brain.

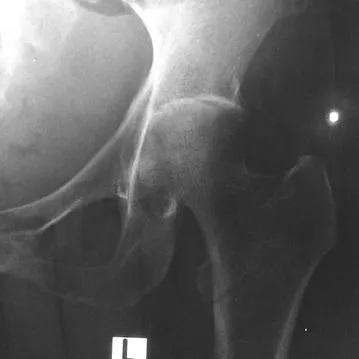
Septic arthritis of the left hip with joint destruction.

Most people exposed to B. pseudomallei experience no symptoms. The mean incubation period of acute melioidosis is 9 days (range 1–21 days). Nevertheless, symptoms of melioidosis can appear in 24 hours for those who experienced near drowning in water. Those affected present with symptoms of sepsis (predominantly fever) with or without pneumonia, or localised abscess or other focus of infection. The presence of non-specific signs and symptoms has caused melioidosis to be nicknamed "the great mimicker".

Diabetes mellitus is one of the most important risk factors in developing melioidosis. The disease should be considered in anyone who has spent time in endemic areas who develops a fever, pneumonia, or abscesses in their liver, spleen, prostate, or parotid gland. The clinical manifestation of the disease can range from simple skin changes such as abscesses or ulcerations to severe organ problems. The commonest organs affected are the liver, spleen, lungs, prostate, and kidneys. Among the most common features are bacteremia (in 40 to 60% of cases), pneumonia (50%), and septic shock (20%). People with only pneumonia may have a prominent cough with sputum and shortness of breath. However, those with septic shock together with pneumonia may have minimal coughing. Results of a chest X-ray can range from diffuse nodular infiltrates in those with septic shock to progressive consolidation located most commonly in the upper lobes for those with pneumonia only. Pleural effusion and empyema are more common for melioidosis affecting the lower lobes of the lungs. In 10% of cases, people develop secondary pneumonia caused by other bacteria after the primary infection. In northern Australia, 60% of the infected children presented with only skin lesions, while 20% presented with pneumonia.

Depending on the course of infection, other severe manifestations develop. Approximately 1 to 5% of those infected develop inflammation of the brain and brain covering or brain abscess; 14 to 28% develop pyelonephritis, kidney abscess or prostatic abscesses; 0 to 30% develop neck or salivary gland abscesses; 10 to 33% develop liver, spleen, or paraintestinal abscesses; and 4 to 14% develop septic arthritis and osteomyelitis. Rare manifestations include lymph node disease resembling tuberculosis, mediastinal masses, pericardial effusion, mycotic aneurysm, and inflammation of the pancreas. In Australia, up to 20% of infected males develop prostatic abscess which may manifest clinically as pain during urination, difficulty in passing urine, and urinary retention requiring catheterisation. Rectal examination may find enlarged prostate. In Thailand, 30% of the infected children develop parotid abscesses. Encephalomyelitis not only happens in those with risk factors but can also occur in healthy people without risk factors. Those with melioidosis encephalomyelitis tend to have normal computed tomography (CT) scans but increased T2 signal by magnetic resonance imaging (MRI), extending to the brain stem and spinal cord. Clinical signs include: unilateral upper motor neuron limb weakness, cerebellar signs, and cranial nerve palsies (VI, VII nerve palsies and bulbar palsy). Some cases presented with flaccid paralysis alone. In northern Australia, all melioidosis with encephalomyelitis cases had elevated white cells in the cerebrospinal fluid (CSF), mostly mononuclear cells with elevated CSF protein.

=== Chronic ===
Chronic melioidosis is usually defined by symptoms lasting greater than two months and occurs in about 10% of patients. Clinical presentations include fever, weight loss, productive cough with or without bloody sputum which may mimic tuberculosis. Additionally, long-standing abscesses at multiple body sites may also present. Tuberculosis should be considered for lymph nodes enlargement at the root of the lung. Additionally, pneumonia caused by melioidosis rarely causes scarring and calcification of the lungs, unlike tuberculosis.

=== Latent ===
The potential for prolonged incubation was recognized in US servicemen involved in the Vietnam War, and was referred to as the "Vietnam time-bomb". Initially, it was thought that the longest period between presumed exposure and clinical presentation is 62 years in a prisoner of war in Burma-Thailand-Malaysia. However, subsequent genotyping of the bacteria isolate from the Vietnam veteran showed that the isolate may not come from Southeast Asia, but from South America. This reinstates another report that put the longest latency period for melioidosis as 29 years. Patients with latent melioidosis may be symptom-free for decades. Less than 5% of all melioidosis cases have activation after a period of latency. Various comorbidities such as diabetes, renal failure, and alcoholism can predispose to reactivation of melioidosis.

== Cause ==
=== Bacteria ===
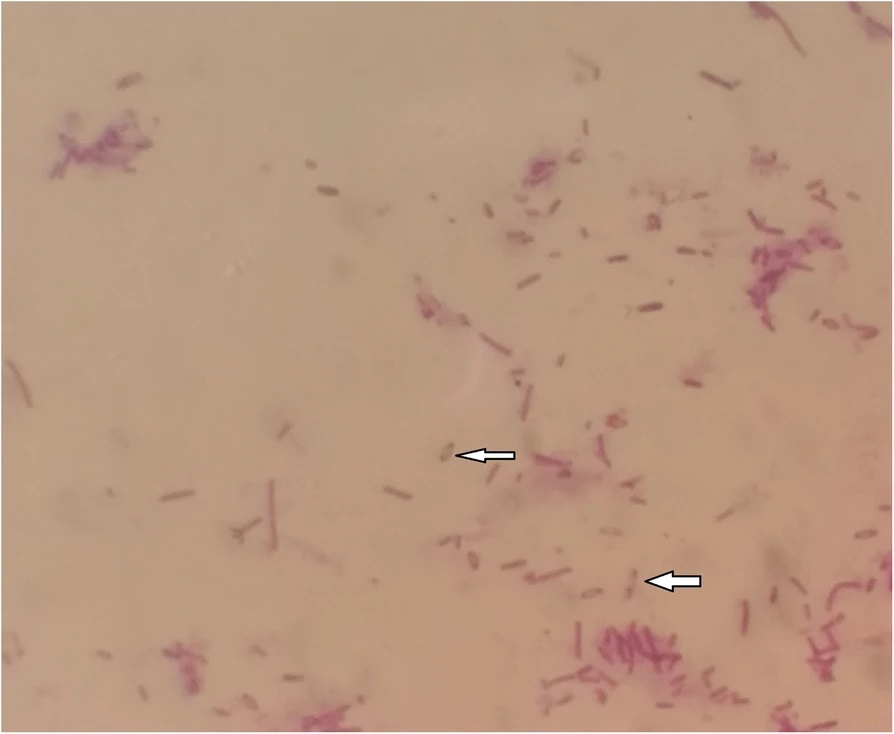
Burkholderia pseudomallei with bipolar Gram staining, referred to as a "safety-pin" appearance.

Melioidosis is caused by gram-negative, motile, saprophytic bacteria named Burkholderia pseudomallei. The bacteria are usually opportunistic, facultative intracellular pathogens. It is also aerobic and oxidase test positive. A granule at the centre of the bacterium makes it resemble a "safety pin" when Gram stained. The bacteria emit a strong soil smell after 24 to 48 hours of growth in culture, however smelling for the identification of the bacteria is not recommended for routine laboratory practice. One of the factors causing B. pseudomallei's resistance to various kinds of antibiotics is because it produces a glycocalyx polysaccharide capsule. It is generally resistant to gentamicin and colistin but sensitive to co-amoxiclav. B. pseudomallei is a biosafety level 3 pathogen which requires specialized laboratory handling. In humans and animals, another similar organism named Burkholderia mallei is the causative agent of the disease glanders. B. pseudomallei can be differentiated from another closely related, but less pathogenic species B. thailandensis by its ability to assimilate arabinose. B. pseudomallei is highly adaptable to various host environments ranging from inside mycorrhizal fungi spores to amoeba. Its adaptability may give it a survival advantage in the human body.

The genome of B. pseudomallei consists of two replicons: chromosome 1 encodes housekeeping functions of the bacteria such as cell wall synthesis, mobility, and metabolism; chromosome 2 encodes functions that allow the bacteria to adapt to various environments. Horizontal gene transfer has resulted in highly variable genomes in B. pseudomallei. Australia has been suggested as the origin for B. pseudomallei because of the high genetic variability of the bacteria found in this region. Bacteria that were introduced to Central and South America in the 17th to 19th centuries seem to have a common ancestor from Africa. B. mallei is a clone of B. pseudomallei that has lost substantial portions of its genome as it adapted to live exclusively in mammals. This makes the B. mallei genome much smaller than B. pseudomallei.

=== Transmission ===
B. pseudomallei is normally found in soil and surface water, and is most abundant at soil depths of 10 to 90 cm. It has been found in soils, ponds, streams, pools, stagnant water, and rice paddy fields. B. pseudomallei can survive in nutrient-poor conditions such as distilled water, desert soil, and nutrient-depleted soil for more than 16 years. It can also survive in antiseptic and detergent solutions, acidic environments (pH 4.5 for 70 days), and in environments at temperatures ranging from 24 °C (75.2 °F) to 32 °C (89.6 °F). However, the bacteria may be killed by the presence of ultraviolet light.

Bacteria can enter the body through wounds, inhalation, and ingestion of contaminated soil or water. Person-to-person transmission is extremely rare. Melioidosis is a recognised disease in animals including pigs, cats, dogs, goats, sheep, horses, and others. Cattle, water buffalo, and crocodiles are considered to be relatively resistant to melioidosis despite their constant exposure to mud. Birds are also considered resistant to melioidosis although several cases had been reported in Australia and aquatic birds. Transmission from animals to humans is rare.

Inadequate chlorination of the water supply has been associated with B. pseudomallei outbreak in Northern and Western Australia. There were also several cases of bacteria being found in unchlorinated water supply in rural Thailand. Based on the whole genome sequencing of the bacteria, the variety of the bacteria B. pseudomallei in Papua New Guinea is narrow due to limited movements of the indigenous people. This findings supports the hypothesis that humans play an important role in bacterial dispersal.

== Pathogenesis ==
Ways of B. pseudomallei bacteria infecting human cells and blood stream.

B. pseudomallei has the ability to infect various types of cells and to evade human immune responses. Bacteria first enter at a break in the skin or mucous membrane and replicate in the epithelial cells. From there, they use flagellar motility to spread and infect various cell types. In the bloodstream, the bacteria can infect both phagocytes and non-phagocytes. B. pseudomallei use their flagella to move near host cells, then attach to the cells using various adhesion proteins, including the type IV pilus protein PilA as well as adhesion proteins BoaA and BoaB. Additionally, adhesion of the bacteria partially depends on the presence of the host protein Protease-activated receptor-1 which is present on the surface of endothelial cells, platelets, and monocytes. Once bound, the bacteria enter host cells through endocytosis, ending up inside an endocytic vesicle. As the vesicle acidifies, B. pseudomallei uses its type 3 secretion system (T3SS) to inject effector proteins into the host cell, disrupting the vesicle and allowing the bacteria to escape into the host cytoplasm. Within the host cytoplasm, the bacteria evade being killed by host autophagy using various T3SS effector proteins. The bacteria replicate in the host cytoplasm.

Inside the host cell, the bacteria move by inducing the polymerization of the host actin behind them, propelling the bacteria forward. This actin-mediated motility is accomplished with the autotransporter BimA which interacts with actin at the tail-end of the bacterium. The bacteria that carry a BimABm allele have a higher possibility of causing neurological melioidosis—and thus a higher chance of death and residual disability to the host—when compared to bacteria that have the BimABp variant. Propelled by actin, the bacteria push against the host membrane, creating protrusions that extend into neighbouring cells. These protrusions cause neighboring cells to fuse, leading to the formation of multinucleated giant cells (MNGCs). When MNGCs lyse, they form plaques (a central clear area with a ring of fused cells) that provide shelter for the bacteria for further replication or latent infection. This same process in infected neurons can allow bacteria to travel through nerve roots in the spinal cord and brain, leading to inflammation of the brain and spinal cord. In addition to spreading from cell to cell, the bacteria can also spread through the bloodstream, causing sepsis. The bacteria can survive in antigen-presenting cells and dendritic cells. Thus, these cells act as vehicles that transport the bacteria into the lymphatic system, causing widespread dissemination of the bacteria in the human body.

While B. pseudomallei can survive in phagocytic cells, these cells can kill B. pseudomallei by several mechanisms. Macrophages activated by interferon gamma (IFN) have improved the killing of B. pseudomallei via the production of inducible nitric oxide synthase. Acidification of the endosome and degradation of the bacteria is also possible, however, the bacterial capsule and LPS make B. pseudomallei resistant to lysosomal degradation. Once B. pseudomallei escapes into the host cytosol it can be recognized by pattern recognition receptors such as NOD-like receptors, triggering the formation of the inflammasome and activation of caspase 1, which induces death of the host cell by pyroptosis and further activation of the immune system. Several systemic host defenses also contribute to the immune response. B. pseudomallei triggers both the complement system and coagulation cascade, however, the thick bacterial capsule prevents the action of the complement membrane attack complex.

Additional elements of the immune system are activated by the host toll-like receptors such as TLR2, TLR4, and TLR5 that recognize the conserved pieces of the bacteria such as LPS and flagella. This activation results in the production of cytokines such as Interleukin 1 beta (IL-1β) and Interleukin 18 (IL-18). IL-18 increases IFN production through natural killer cells while IL-1beta reduces the IFN production. These immune molecules drive the recruitment of other immune cells such as neutrophils, dendritic cells, B cells, and T cells to the site of infection. T cells seem to be particularly important for controlling B. pseudomallei; T cell numbers are increased in survivors, and low T cell numbers are associated with a high risk of death from melioidosis. Despite this, HIV infection is not a risk factor for melioidosis. Although macrophages show deregulated cytokine responses in individuals with HIV infection, bacterial internalization and intracellular killing are still effective. People infected with B. pseudomallei may develop antibodies against the bacteria, and people who live in endemic areas tend to have antibodies in their blood that recognize B. pseudomallei. However, the effectiveness of these antibodies at preventing melioidosis is unclear.

B. pseudomallei can remain latent in the human body for up to 29 years until it is reactivated during human immunosuppression or stress response. However, the site of bacteria during latent infection and the mechanism by which they avoid immune recognition for years are both unclear. Amongst mechanisms suggested are: residing in the nucleus of the cell to prevent being digested, entering a stage of slower growth, antibiotic resistance, and genetic adaption to the host environment. Granulomas (containing neutrophils, macrophages, lymphocytes, and multinucleated giant cells) formed at the infection site in melioidosis have been associated with latent infection in humans.

== Diagnosis ==
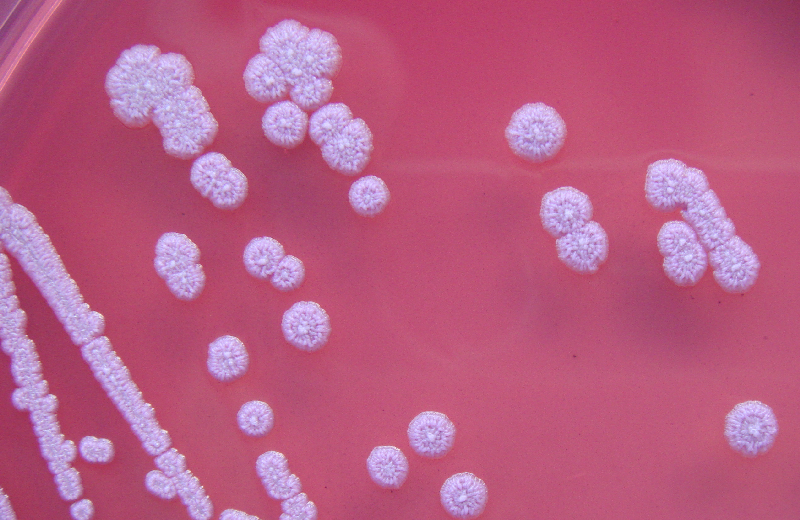
Appearance of B. pseudomallei colonies on Ashdown's medium after four days of incubation.

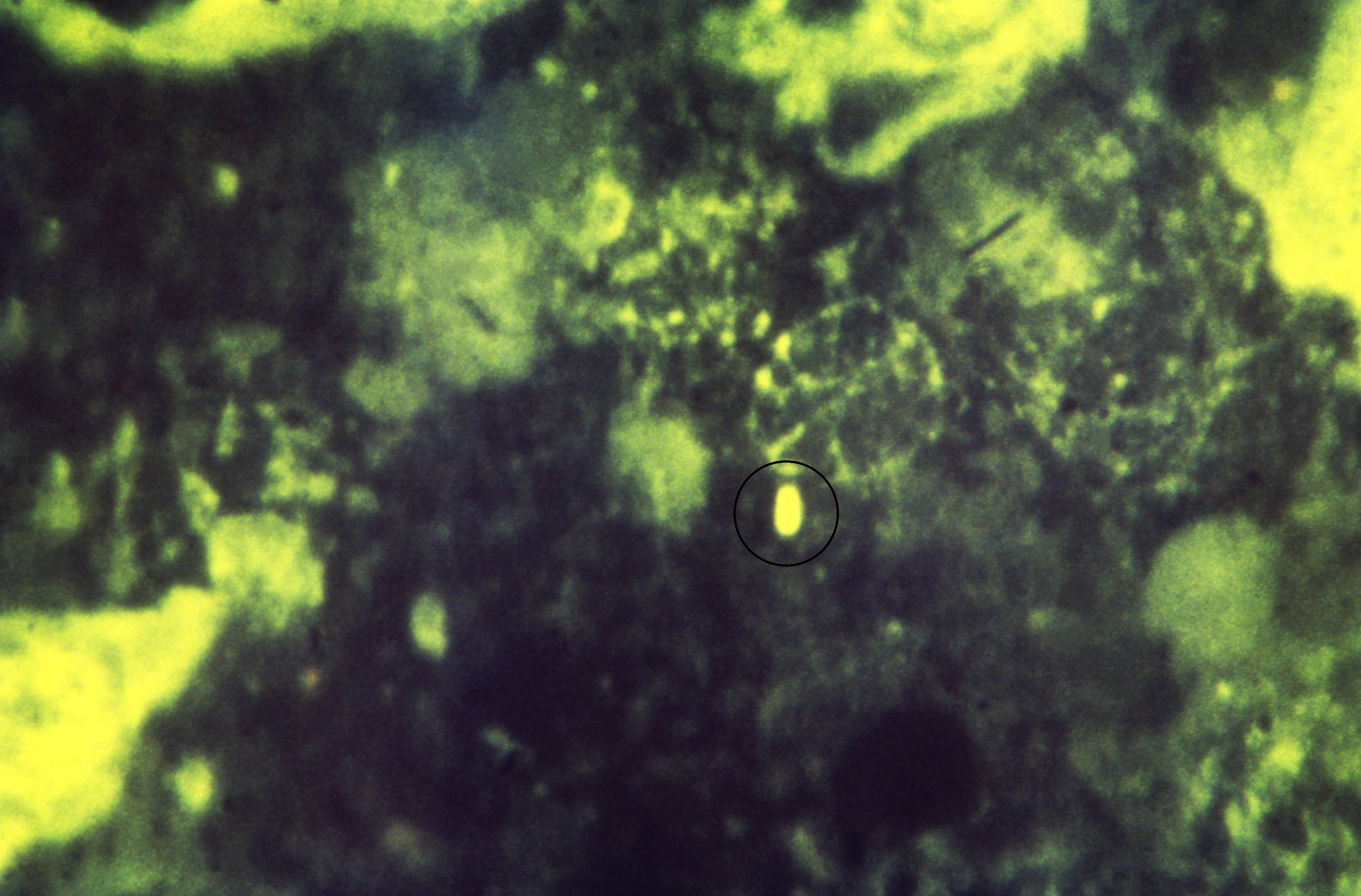
Immunofluorescent microscopy showing the presence of B. pseudomallei.

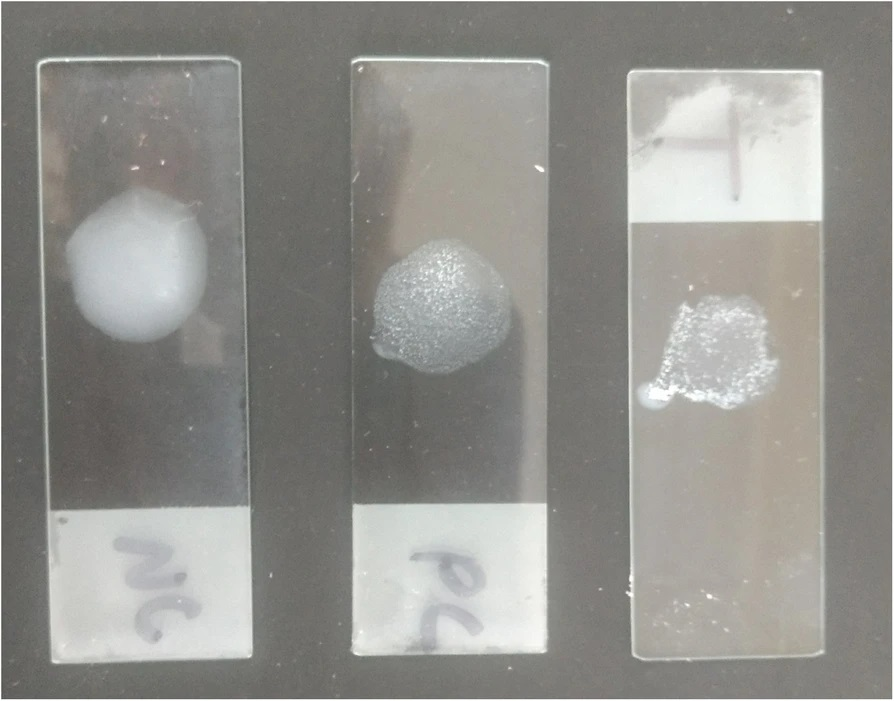
Right-most slide showing positive latex agglutination for melioidosis.

=== Culture ===
Bacterial culture has 60% sensitivity in diagnosing melioidosis. B. pseudomallei is never part of human flora. Therefore, any growth of the bacteria is diagnostic of melioidosis. Other samples such as throat, rectal swabs, pus from abscesses, and sputum can also be used for culture. However, culture from CSF is difficult because in one case series, only 29% of the neuromelioidosis cases are culture-positive. When bacteria do not grow from people strongly suspected of having melioidosis, repeated cultures should be taken as subsequent cultures can become positive. B. pseudomallei can be grown on any blood agar, MacConkey agar, and agar containing antibiotics such as Ashdown's medium (containing gentamicin), and Ashdown's broth (containing colistin) for better isolation of B. pseudomallei from other types of bacteria. Agar plates for melioidosis should be incubated at 37 °C (98.6 °F) in air and inspected daily for four days. On the agar plates, B. pseudomallei forms creamy, non-haemolytic, colonies after 2 days of incubation. After 4 days of incubation, colonies appear dry and wrinkled. Colonies of B. pseudomallei that are grown on Francis medium (a modification of Ashdown medium with gentamicin concentration increased to 8 mg/L and neutral red indicator replaced with 0.2% bromocresol purple) are yellow. For laboratories located outside endemic areas, Burkholderia cepacia selective agar can be used if Ashdown's medium is not available. It is important not misinterpret the bacterial growth as Pseudomonas or Bacillus spp. Other biochemical screening tools can also be used for detecting B. pseudomallei, including the API 20NE or 20E biochemical kit combined with Gram stain, oxidase test, typical growth characteristics, and resistance to certain antibiotics of the bacteria. API 20NE biochemical kit is 99% sensitive in identifying B. pseudomallei.

Molecular methods such as 16S rDNA sequencing, multiplex polymerase chain reaction (PCR), and real-time PCR can also be used to identify B. pseudomallei in culture. Other bacterial genes such as fliC genes encoding flagellin, rpsU gene encoding for ribosomal protein, and TTS genes encoding Type III secretion systems have also been employed for detection. Another method of gene detection namely multiple cross displacement amplification for the bacterial TTS1 gene detection produces results within an hour.

=== Hematological and biochemical tests ===
General blood tests in people with melioidosis show low white blood cell counts (indicates infection), raised liver enzymes, increased bilirubin levels (indicates liver dysfunction), and raised urea and creatinine levels (indicates kidney dysfunction). Low blood glucose and acidosis predicts a poorer prognosis in those with melioidosis. However, other tests such as C-reactive protein and procalcitonin levels are not reliable in predicting the severity of melioidosis infection.

=== Serological tests ===
Serological tests such as indirect haemagglutination assay (IHA) have been used to detect the presence of antibodies against B. pseudomallei. However, different groups of people have widely different levels of antibodies, so the interpretation of these tests depends on location. In Australia, less than 5% of people have B. pseudomallei antibodies, so the presence of even relatively low amounts of antibodies is unusual and could suggest melioidosis. In Thailand, many people have antibodies against B. pseudomallei so the diagnosis of melioidosis should not be reliant entirely on the serological tests done in endemic areas. Indirect immunofluorescent test (IFAT) uses either B. pseudomallei or B. thailandensis antigens to look for the total number of antibodies in human serum. Using IFAT is labour intensive and is not used in large-scale investigations.

Antigen detection tests allow rapid detection of melioidosis. Examples of antigen detection tests are: the latex agglutination test and ELISA. Latex agglutination uses antibodies coated on latex beads to detect B. pseudomallei antigens in solid or liquid media, although not all the assays can detect different species of Burkholderia. Latex agglutination is useful in screening for suspected B. pseudomallei colonies. IgG and IgM ELISAs have been used to detect lipopolysaccharide (LPS) antigens of B. pseudomallei, but plagued with low sensitivity. Commercial ELISA kits for melioidosis no longer available in the market due to low sensitivity to human antibodies detection. Nevertheless, antigen detection tests may be useful in severely ill patients because the bacterial load is high enough for detection. Other methods of antigen detection such as direct immunofluorescence, antibody-sandwich ELISAs, and lateral flow immunoassays using monoclonal antibody.

=== Microscopy ===
By microscopy, B. pseudomallei is seen as gram-negative and rod-shaped, with bipolar staining similar in appearance to a safety pin. Bacteria can sometimes be seen directly in clinical samples from infected people; however, identification by light microscopy is neither specific nor sensitive. Immunofluorescence microscopy is highly specific for detecting bacteria directly from clinical specimens, but has less than 50% sensitivity.

=== Imaging ===
Various imaging modalities can also help with the diagnosis of melioidosis. In acute melioidosis with the spreading of the bacteria through the bloodstream, the chest X-ray shows multifocal nodular lesions. It may also show merging nodules or cavitations. For those with acute melioidosis without the spread to the bloodstream, chest X-ray most commonly shows upper lobe consolidation or cavitations. In chronic melioidosis, the slow progression of upper lobe consolidation of the lungs resembles tuberculosis. For abscesses located in other parts of the body apart from the lungs, especially in the liver and spleen, CT scan has higher sensitivity when compared with an ultrasound scan. In liver and splenic abscesses, an ultrasound scan shows "target-like" lesions while a CT scan shows "honeycomb sign" (abscess with loculations separated by thin septa) in liver abscesses. For melioidosis involving the brain, MRI has higher sensitivity than a CT scan in diagnosing the lesion. MRI shows ring-enhancing lesions for brain melioidosis.

== Prevention ==
Melioidosis is a notifiable disease in Australia which enables the country to monitor disease burden and contain outbreaks. On the other hand, melioidosis is only a notifiable condition in Thailand since June 2016. However, until recently, the official notification system in Thailand has significantly underestimated the incidence of culture-positive melioidosis and its mortality. Nevertheless, Australia also embarked on awareness campaigns to increase the community's understanding of the disease. In the United Kingdom, where reporting by laboratories is mandatory, 41.3% of cases imported since 2010 were not notified. In the United States, lab workers can handle clinical specimens of B. pseudomallei under BSL-2 conditions, while mass production of such organisms requires BSL-3 precautions. On the other hand, in other endemic areas where the B. pseudomallei samples were handled less stringently, there has been no confirmed laboratory-acquired infection reported. This phenomenon may show that the risk of infection with B. pseudomallei is less than a typical biohazard type 3 agent. There are also several cases of hospital-acquired infection of melioidosis. Therefore, healthcare providers are recommended to practice hand hygiene and universal precautions.

Large-scale water chlorination has been successful at reducing B. pseudomallei in the water in Australia. In middle to low-income countries, water should be boiled before consumption. In high-income countries, water could be treated with ultraviolet light for those at risk of contracting melioidosis. Those who are at high risk of contact with the bacteria should wear protective gear (such as boots and gloves) during work. Those staying in endemic areas should avoid direct contact with soil and outdoor exposure to heavy rain or dust clouds. Bottled water or boiled water are preferred as drinking water. A study conducted from 2014 to 2018, however, showed no significant differences in whether behavioural changes can reduce the risk of contracting melioidosis. Modification of behavioural changes or more frequent interventions may be needed to ensure a definite reduction in the risk of getting melioidosis.

=== Antibiotic prophylaxis ===
Administering cotrimoxazole three times a week throughout a wet season for dialysis patients has no obvious benefit in preventing melioidosis. Besides, the high cost and side effects of this drug limit its use to only those with a high risk of getting melioidosis. After exposure to B. pseudomallei (particularly following a laboratory accident, penetrating injuries, exposure of mouth and eyes to contaminated materials or aerosols), treatment with antibiotics is only given when in highly selected individuals after weighing the risk of adverse effects of the drugs against the benefits from contracting melioidosis. Cotrimoxazole can be used in this context. Alternatively, co-amoxiclav and doxycycline can be used for those who are intolerant to co-trimoxazole. Low-risk individuals would receive frequent monitoring instead.

=== Vaccination ===
Several vaccine candidates have been tested in animal models. Nevertheless, no vaccine candidates have been tried in humans. Major hurdles of the vaccines are limited efficacy in animal models, establishing the best method of vaccine administration in humans, and logistical and financial issues in establishing human trials in endemic areas.

== Treatment ==
The treatment of melioidosis is divided into two stages: an intravenous intensive phase and an eradication phase to prevent recurrence. The choice of antibiotics depends upon the susceptibility of the bacteria to various antibiotics. B. pseudomallei are generally susceptible to ceftazidime, meropenem, imipenem, and co-amoxiclav. These drugs generally kill bacteria. B. pseudomallei is also susceptible to doxycycline, chloramphenicol, and co-trimoxazole. These drugs generally inhibit the growth of the bacteria. However, the bacteria are resistant to penicillin, ampicillin, 1st and 2nd generation cephalosporin, gentamicin, streptomycin, tobramycin, macrolides, and polymyxins. On the other hand, 86% of the B. pseudomallei isolates from the region of Sarawak, Malaysia are susceptible to gentamicin and this has not been found elsewhere in other parts of the world.

Before 1989, the standard treatment for acute melioidosis was a three-drug combination of chloramphenicol, co-trimoxazole, and doxycycline; this regimen is associated with a mortality rate of 80% and is no longer used unless no other alternatives are available. All three drugs are bacteriostatic (they stop the bacterium from growing, but do not kill it) and the action of co-trimoxazole antagonizes both chloramphenicol and doxycycline.

=== Intensive phase ===
Intravenous ceftazidime is the current drug of choice for the treatment of acute melioidosis and should be administered for at least 10 to 14 days. Meropenem, imipenem and the cefoperazone-sulbactam combination (Sulperazone) are also effective. Intravenous amoxicillin-clavulanate (co-amoxiclav) may be used if none of the above four drugs is available; co-amoxiclav prevents death from melioidosis as well as ceftazidime. Co-amoxiclav is also used if the patient has an allergy towards sulfonamide, unable to tolerate co-trimoxazole, in pregnant patients or children. A high dose of co-amoxiclav (20 mg/kg for amoxicillin and 5 mg/kg for clavulanate) is recommended to prevent treatment failures. Intravenous antibiotics are given for a minimum of 10 to 14 days. The median fever clearance time in melioidosis is 9 days. The treatment duration is in accordance with Darwin melioidosis treatment guidelines where there is a low rate of recrudescence and relapse.

Meropenem is the preferred antibiotic therapy for neurological melioidosis and for those with septic shock admitted into intensive care units. Co-trimoxazole is recommended in addition to ceftazidime for neurological melioidosis, osteomyelitis, septic arthritis, skin and gastrointestinal infection, and deeply seated abscesses. For deep-seated infections such as abscesses of internal organs, osteomyelitis, septic arthritis, and neurological melioidosis, the duration of antibiotics given should be longer (up to 4 to 8 weeks). The time taken for the fever to be resolved can be more than 10 days in those with deep-seated infection. According to the 2020 Revised Royal Darwin Hospital Guideline, the dosage for intravenous ceftazidime is 2g 6-hourly in adults (50 mg/kg up to 2g in children less than 15 years old). The dosage for meropenem is 1g 8-hourly in adults (25 mg/kg up to 1g in children). Acquired resistance to ceftazidime, carbapenems, and co-amoxiclav is rare in the intensive phase but resistance to cotrimoxazole during eradication therapy is technically difficult to assess. There are no differences between using cefoperazone/sulbactam or ceftazidime to treat melioidosis as both show similar death rates and disease progression following treatment. However, data are lacking to recommend cefoperazone/sulbactam usage. For those with kidney impairment, the dosage of ceftazidime, meropenem, and co-trimoxazole should be lowered. Once the clinical condition improves, meropenem can be switched back to ceftazidime.

=== Eradication phase ===
Following the treatment of the acute disease, eradication treatment with co-trimoxazole is the drug of choice and should be used for 3 months (12 weeks) as all-cause mortality was lower in 12 weeks group when compared to those receiving treatment for 20 weeks. For those with neurological melioidosis and osteomyelitis, drugs should be given for more than 6 months. Co-amoxiclav and doxycycline are drugs of second choice. Co-trimoxazole should not be used in those with glucose-6-phosphate dehydrogenase deficiency as it can cause haemolytic anemia. However, in Thailand, usage of co-trimoxazole does not accompany G6PD screening. Other side effects such as rash, hyperkalemia, renal dysfunction, and gastrointestinal symptoms should prompt the reduction of co-trimoxazole doses. Chloramphenicol is no longer routinely recommended for this purpose. Co-amoxiclav is an alternative for patients unable to take co-trimoxazole and doxycycline (e.g. pregnant women and children under the age of 12), but is not as effective and has a higher relapse rate. Single-agent treatment with fluoroquinolone (e.g., ciprofloxacin) or doxycycline for the oral eradication phase is ineffective.

In Australia, co-trimoxazole is used with children and pregnant mothers after the first 12 weeks of pregnancy. Meanwhile, in Thailand, co-amoxiclav is the drug of choice for children and pregnant women. B. pseudomallei rarely acquires resistance when co-amoxiclav is used. The dosing regimen for co-trimoxazole (trimethoprim/sulfamethoxazole) in eradication phase is 6/30 mg/kg, up to maximum 240/1200 mg in children, 240/1200 mg in adults weighing 40 to 60 kg, and 320/1600 mg in adults weighing more than 60 kg, taken orally every 12 hours. In both Thailand and Australia, co-trimoxazole is taken together with folic acid (0.1 mg/kg up to 5 mg in children). There are also cases where melioidosis is successfully treated with co-trimoxazole for 3 months without going through intensive therapy provided that there is only skin manifestations without the involvement of internal organs or sepsis. Resistance to cotrimoxazole is rare in Asia. Besides that, it is difficult to determine the resistance reliably because resistance to cotrimoxazole is defined when minimum inhibitory concentration (MIC) of more than 4 mg/L is required to completely inhibit the growth of 80% of the bacteria (80% inhibition point). Interpretation of the 80% inhibition point is subjective and prone to human error. In 2021, European Committee on Antimicrobial Susceptibility Testing (EUCAST) released a new guideline on interpreting the susceptibility of B pseudomallei towards various antibiotics on disc susceptibility testing. The new guideline includes "S" for susceptible organisms, "I" for susceptible organisms only after increased exposure (when dosage or concentration of the drug increases), and "R" for resistant organisms.

=== Surgery ===
Surgical drainage is indicated for single, large abscesses in the liver, muscle, and prostate. However, for multiple abscesses in the liver, spleen, and kidney, surgical drainage may not be possible or necessary. For septic arthritis, arthrotomy washout and drainage are required. Surgical debridement may be necessary. For those with mycotic aneurysm, urgent surgery is required for prosthetic vascular grafts. Lifelong therapy with co-trimoxazole may be needed for those with prosthetic vascular grafts according to a review of case reports in 2005. Other abscesses rarely need to be drained because most resolve with antibiotic treatment. Prostate abscess may require routine imaging. Antibiotics treatment for prostatic abscess may be enough except for abscesses more than 10 to 15 mm where surgical drainage is required.

=== Others ===
Several immunomodulating therapies are suggested to boost the human body's immune function against the bacteria because the pathogenesis of melioidosis is thought to be contributed by defects in neutrophils. The Royal Darwin Hospital 2014 guidelines recommended granulocyte colony-stimulating factor (G-CSF) as immunomodulating therapy for those with septic shock at 300 ug daily as soon as the bacteriological laboratory flag the culture as possibly Burkholderia pseudomallei. The main contraindication of starting (G-CSF) is a heart event. The G-CSF is continued for ten days depending on clinical response or a contraindication develops such as a white cell count greater than >50,000 X106/litre.

Anti-PDI (programmed cell death) agents could be useful in melioidosis treatment, especially for those with septic shock. This is because Burkholderia pseudomallei bacteria increase the expression of PDI-1 that regulates and inhibits the formation of T-cells that are essential for fighting against melioidosis.

== Prognosis ==
In well-resourced settings, where the disease can be detected and treated early, the risk of death is 10%. In resource-poor settings, the risk of death from the disease is more than 40%.

Recurrent melioidosis can occur either due to re-infection or relapse after the completion of eradication therapy. Re-infection is due to a new strain of B. pseudomallei bacteria. Meanwhile, relapse is due to failure to clear infections after the eradication therapy. Recurrent melioidosis is rare since 2014 due to improved antibiotic therapy and prolongation of the intensive phase of therapy as evident in Darwin Prospective Melioidosis Study. On the other hand, recrudescence are those who present with symptoms during the eradication therapy. Recrudescence rates may be improved by ensuring adherence to a full course of eradication therapy e.g. by reducing self-discharge against medical advice.

Underlying medical conditions such as diabetes mellitus, chronic kidney disease, and cancer can worsen the long-term survival and disability of those who recover from infection. One of the complications of melioidosis is encephalomyelitis. It can cause quadriparesis (muscle weakness in all the limbs), partial flaccid paraparesis (muscle weakness of both legs), or foot drop. For those with previous melioidosis-associated bone and joint infections, complications such as sinus tract infection, bone, and joint deformities with limited range of motion can occur.

== Epidemiology ==
Number of deaths by each country due to melioidosis in 2018.

Melioidosis is an understudied disease that remains endemic in developing countries. In 2015, the International Melioidosis Society was formed to raise disease awareness. In 2016, a statistical model was developed which predicted that the number is 165,000 cases per year with 138,000 of those occurring in East and South Asia and the Pacific. In approximately half of those cases (54% or 89,000), people will die. Under-reporting is a common problem as only 1,300 cases have been reported worldwide since 2010, which is less than 1% of the projected incidence based on the modelling. Lack of laboratory diagnostic capabilities and lack of disease awareness amongst health care providers also causes underdiagnosis. Even if bacterial cultures show positive results for B. pseudomallei, they can be discarded as contaminants, especially in laboratories in non-endemic areas. In 2015, it was estimated that the yearly disability-adjusted life year (DALY) was 84.3 per 100,000 people. As of 2022, melioidosis is not included in the WHO list of neglected tropical diseases.

=== Geography ===
Melioidosis is endemic in parts of southeast Asia (including Thailand, Laos, Singapore, Brunei, Malaysia, Myanmar and Vietnam), southern China, Taiwan northern Australia. India, and South America. Since 1991, a total of 583 cases were reported in India. Most Indian cases are located in Karnataka and Tamil Nadu. Fifty-one cases of melioidosis were reported in Bangladesh from 1961–2017. Nonetheless, lack of awareness and resources gives rise to underdiagnosis of the disease in the country. The true burden of melioidosis in Africa and the Middle East remains unknown due to the low amount of data. Several melioidosis cases have been reported over the years. Although 24 African countries and three Middle Eastern countries were predicted to be endemic with melioidosis, however not a single case was reported from these specific countries. In the United States, two historical cases (1950 and 1971) and four recent cases (2010, 2011, 2013, 2020) have been reported amongst people that did not travel overseas. Despite extensive investigations, the source of melioidosis was never confirmed. One possible explanation is that importation of medicinal plant products or exotic reptiles could have resulted in the introduction of melioidosis in the United States. In 2021, there was a melioidosis outbreak in several states in the United States due to usage of contaminated aromatherapy spray imported from India. There are also cases of infection through imported tropical fishes in home aquariums. In Europe, more than half of the melioidosis cases are imported from Thailand.

=== Age, risk factors ===
Melioidosis is found in all age groups. For Australia and Thailand, the median age of infection is at 50 years; 5 to 10% of the patients are under 15 years. The single most important risk factor for developing melioidosis is diabetes mellitus, followed by hazardous alcohol use, chronic kidney disease, and chronic lung disease. More than 50% of people with melioidosis have diabetes; diabetics have a 12-fold increased risk of contracting melioidosis. Diabetes decreases the ability of macrophages to fight the bacteria and reduces the T helper cell production. Excessive release of Tumor necrosis factor alpha and Interleukin 12 by mononuclear cells increases the risk of septic shock. Other risk factors include thalassaemia, occupational exposure (e.g. rice paddy farmers), recreational exposure to soil, water, being male, age greater than 45 years, and prolonged steroid use/immunosuppression. However, 8% of children and 20% of adults with melioidosis have no risk factors. HIV infection does not appear to predispose to melioidosis, although several other co-infections have been reported. Infant cases have been reported possibly due to mother-to-child transmission, community-acquired infection, or healthcare-associated infection. Those who are well may also be infected with B. pseudomallei. For example, 25% of children started producing antibodies against B. pseudomallei between 6 months to 4 years of staying in endemic areas although they did not experience any melioidosis symptoms; suggesting they were exposed to it over this time. This means that many people without symptoms will test positive in serology tests in endemic areas. In Thailand, the seropositivity rate exceeds 50%, while in Australia the seropositivity rate is only 5%. The disease is associated with increased rainfall, with the number of cases rising following increased precipitation. Severe rainfall increases the concentration of the bacteria in the topsoil, thus increasing transmission of the bacteria through the air. A recent CDC Advisory indicated that the recent detection of the organism in the environment in Mississippi following the occurrence of two Indigenous cases of melioidosis, confirms that parts of the southern USA should now be regarded as melioidosis-endemic.

== History ==
Pathologist Alfred Whitmore and his assistant Krishnaswami first reported melioidosis among beggars and morphine addicts at autopsy in Rangoon, present-day Myanmar, in a report published in 1912. Whitmore could grow the organism in culture and it showed similarity with B. mallei, another bacteria that was known to cause glanders in animals. Therefore, he named the new organism Bacillus pseudomallei. He did no further work on the organism. Arthur Conan Doyle may have read Whitmore's report before writing a short story that involved the fictitious tropical disease "Tapanuli fever" in a Sherlock Holmes story titled "The Adventure of the Dying Detective" published in 1913. In the same year, melioidosis outbreak occurred inside the Institute for Medical Research (IMR), Kuala Lumpur, Malaya after its laboratory animals such as guinea pigs and rabbits were infected. William Fletcher and Ambrose Thomas Stanton, doctors who worked at the IMR, were the next ones to study the organism. They were unable to identify the organism that caused the outbreak. It was only in 1917 when Fletcher isolated an organism similar to Whitmore's bacillus from a Tamil rubber estate worker, the presence of the new species of bacteria was confirmed. The term "melioidosis" was first coined in 1921. The name melioidosis is derived from the Greek melis (μηλις) meaning "a distemper of asses" with the suffixes -oid meaning "similar to" and -osis meaning "a condition", that is, a condition similar to glanders. B pseudomallei is similar in clinical presentation and genome make-up with B. mallei but is distinguished from it due to epidemiological and zoonotic characteristics.

The first human case of melioidosis in South Asia was reported in Sri Lanka in 1927. In 1932, Thomas and Fletcher collected 83 cases of melioidosis from literature. In this case series, there were only two survivors. Since then, more case series of melioidosis have been reported. Thomas and Fletcher also pioneered the use of serological methods in diagnosing the disease. Thomas and Fletcher incorrectly believed that melioidosis infection came from human contact with rodents. However, observations on the disease noted that humans usually got it after exposure to mud or contaminated water. Besides, the organism was never grown from rats. This led to a search of the bacteria in the environment. In 1936, the first animal (pig) case of melioidosis in Africa was reported in Madagascar. In 1937, water was first identified as the habitat of B. pseudomallei. The first case of Australian melioidosis was described in an outbreak in sheep in 1949 at North Queensland. This was followed by the first case of human melioidosis at Townsville in 1950. Initially, the discovery of melioidosis in Australia led to a debate on when and how the disease spread from Southeast Asia to a new distant environment. However, this hypothesis was later disproved in 2017 when whole genome sequencing of B. pseudomallei over 30 countries collected over 79 years suggested Australia as the early reservoir for melioidosis. In 1955, the first case of local human melioidosis was reported in Thailand. During the Vietnam War from 1967 to 1973, 343 American soldiers were reported with melioidosis, with about 50 cases transmitted through inhalation. An outbreak of melioidosis at the Paris Zoo in the 1970s (known as L'affaire du jardin des plantes) was thought to have originated from an imported panda or horses from Iran. It is unclear how imported melioidosis can persist in a completely new environment. Eventually, the outbreak terminated itself after some time. It was only during the 1980s, Infectious Disease Association of Thailand started to take notice of this disease. The first conference on melioidosis was held in 1985 in Thailand. It was during this meeting that collaboration between Sappasitprasong Hospital, Thailand, and Wellcome-Mahido-Oxford Tropical Medicine Research Programme was established. Such collaboration made Thailand a world leader in clinical and epidemiology research on melioidosis.

In 1989, several studies conducted in Thailand demonstrated ceftazidime as an effective antibiotic against melioidosis. Ceftazidime had been shown to reduce the risk of death of melioidosis from 74% to 37%. In 1990, a non-virulent 'arabinose-positive B. pseudomallei' was found by Vanaporn Wuthiekanun. The organism was later reclassified into a new species called B. thailandensis. This species has become a useful tool in the laboratory for the studies of the pathogenesis of B. pseudomallei. B. pseudomallei was previously classified as part of the genus Pseudomonas. In 1992, the pathogen was formally named B. pseudomallei. In 1994, the First International Symposium on melioidosis was held in Kuala Lumpur where 80 delegates attended. Papers were presented and later published as a book. Subsequent congresses were held in Thailand, Australia, and Singapore once every three years. In 2002, B. pseudomallei was classified as a "Category B agent". In 2004, the complete genome of B. pseudomallei was published. In 2012, B pseudomallei was classified as a "Tier 1 select agent" by the U.S. Centers for Disease Control. In 2014, co-trimoxazole was established as the only oral eradication therapy rather than the combination therapy of co-trimoxazole with doxycycline. In 2016, a statistical model was developed to predict the occurrence of global melioidosis per year.

== Synonyms ==
- Pseudoglanders
- Vietnamese tuberculosis
- Whitmore's disease (after Captain Alfred Whitmore, who first described the disease)
- Nightcliff gardener's disease (Nightcliff is a suburb of Darwin, Australia where melioidosis is endemic)
- Paddy-field disease
- Morphia injector's septicaemia

== Biological warfare ==
Interest in melioidosis has been expressed because it has the potential to be developed as a biological weapon. Another similar bacterium, Burkholderia mallei was used by the Germans in World War I to infect livestock shipped to Allied countries. Deliberate infection of human prisoners of war and animals using B. mallei were carried out in China's Pingfang District by the Japanese during World War II. The Soviet Union reportedly used B. mallei during the Soviet–Afghan War in 1982 and 1984. B. pseudomallei, like B. mallei, was studied by both the US and Soviet Union as a potential biological warfare agent, but never weaponized. Other countries such as Iran, Iraq, North Korea, and Syria may have investigated the properties of B. pseudomallei for biological weapons. The bacterium is readily available in the environment. It can also be aerosolized and transmitted via inhalation. However, the B. pseudomallei has never been used in biological warfare. The actual risk of the deliberate release of B. pseudomallei or B. mallei is unknown.
