= Recrudescence =

Term used to describe relapse, revival, or return of a condition

Recrudescence is the recurrence of an undesirable condition. In medicine, it is usually defined as the recurrence of symptoms after a period of remission or quiescence, in which sense it can sometimes be synonymous with relapse. In a narrower sense, it can also be such a recurrence with higher severity than before the remission. "Relapse" conventionally has a specific (albeit somewhat illogical) meaning when used in relation to malaria (see below).

== Malaria ==
In malaria, recurrence can take place due to recrudescence; or relapse; or re-infection (via mosquito transmission). Relapse means that a recurrence has been precipitated by a dormant stage in the liver called a "hypnozoite". Thus, relapse is applied only for those plasmodial species that have hypnozoites in the life cycle, such as Plasmodium vivax and P. ovale. On the other hand, recrudescence means that circulating, multiplying parasites are detected after having persisted in the bloodstream (or elsewhere) at undetectable levels for a period of time, as merozoites (as opposed to hypnozoites). This term is applied for Plasmodium species that are not associated with hypnozoite-mediated recurrences, such as P. falciparum, P. malariae, and P. knowlesi. Recrudescence is also used for malarial recurrence caused by drug-resistant strains of P. vivax and P. ovale where parasites remained in the bloodstream despite treatment.

== Melioidosis ==
In melioidosis, a recurrent infection can be due to re-infection and relapse. Re-infection is a recurrence of symptoms due to an infection with a new strain of Burkholderia pseudomallei following the eradication therapy of melioidosis. Meanwhile, relapse are those who presented with melioidosis symptoms due to failure to clear the infection in the bloodstream after completion of eradication therapy. On the other hand, recrudescence is the recurrence of melioidosis symptoms during the eradication therapy.

== Bovine viral diarrhoea ==
The bovine viral diarrhoea virus (bovine virus diarrhea) is said to be recrudescent for some time after clinical signs have abated, because antibodies plateau c. weeks 10–12, and are not lifelong, auto infection may potentially occur in the acutely infected non-pregnant animal.

== Others ==
Other diseases that may recur following a short or long period of quiescence include shingles (after chicken pox), oral herpes and genital herpes, and Brill–Zinsser disease (after epidemic typhus).
