= Burleigh Township, Michigan =

- Civil township
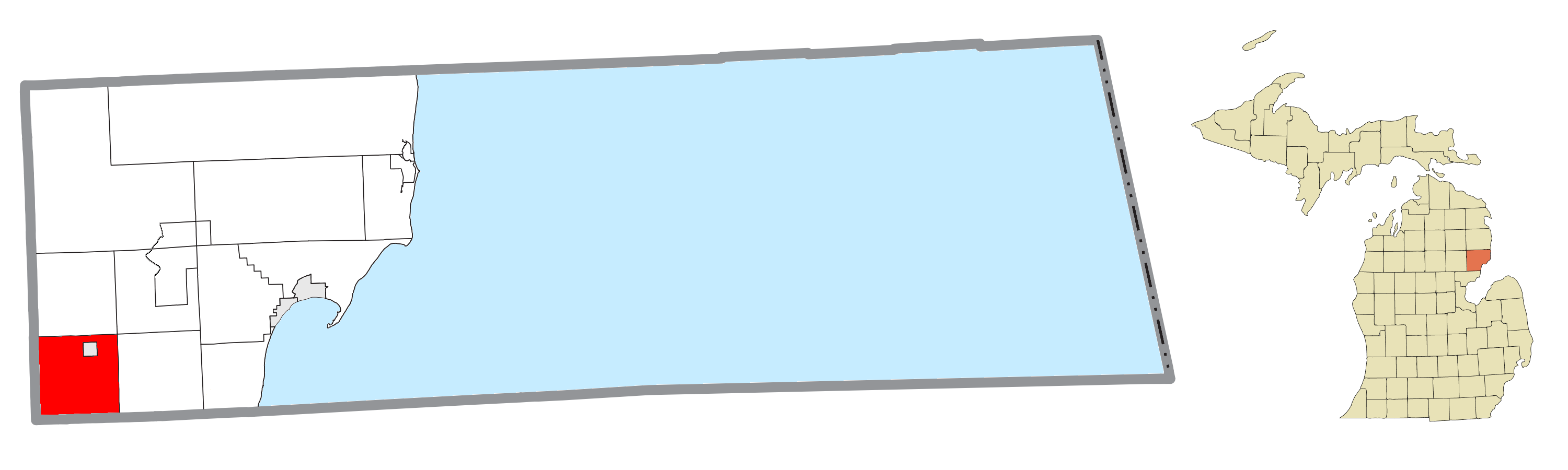
- Location within Iosco County

- Location within the state of Michigan Location within the United States
- Coordinates: 44°12′11″N 83°49′30″W
- Country: United States
- State: Michigan
- County: Iosco

Area
  - Total: 34.7 sq mi (89.9 km^{2})
  - Land: 34.7 sq mi (89.9 km^{2})
  - Water: 0 sq mi (0.0 km^{2})
- Elevation: 705 ft (215 m)

Population (2020)
  - Total: 726
  - Density: 20.9/sq mi (8.08/km^{2})
- Time zone: UTC-5 (Eastern (EST))
  - Summer (DST): UTC-4 (EDT)
- Area code: 989
- FIPS code: 26-11740
- GNIS feature ID: 1626003
- Website: https://burleightownship.org/

Burleigh Township is a civil township of Iosco County in the U.S. state of Michigan. As of the 2020 census, the township population was 726.

== Geography ==
According to the United States Census Bureau, the township has a total area of 34.7 square miles (90 km^{2}), of which 34.7 square miles (90 km^{2}) is land and 0.03% is water. The City of Whittemore, one of the smallest cities in Michigan, is an enclave within the township.

== Demographics ==
As of the census of 2000, there were 775 people, 301 households, and 225 families residing in the township. The population density was 22.3 inhabitants per square mile (8.6/km^{2}). There were 409 housing units at an average density of 11.8 per square mile (4.6/km^{2}). The racial makeup of the township was 98.19% White, 0.26% African American, 0.52% Native American, 0.26% from other races, and 0.77% from two or more races. Hispanic or Latino of any race were 1.55% of the population.

There were 301 households, out of which 27.2% had children under the age of 18 living with them, 65.8% were married couples living together, 7.0% had a female householder with no husband present, and 25.2% were non-families. 19.9% of all households were made up of individuals, and 9.3% had someone living alone who was 65 years of age or older. The average household size was 2.57 and the average family size was 2.97.

In the township the population was spread out, with 24.0% under the age of 18, 7.0% from 18 to 24, 25.7% from 25 to 44, 29.0% from 45 to 64, and 14.3% who were 65 years of age or older. The median age was 41 years. For every 100 females, there were 100.3 males. For every 100 females age 18 and over, there were 96.3 males.

The median income for a household in the township was $33,542, and the median income for a family was $37,868. Males had a median income of $29,911 versus $22,031 for females. The per capita income for the township was $15,726. About 9.8% of families and 11.7% of the population were below the poverty line, including 13.6% of those under age 18 and 9.7% of those age 65 or over.
