= Whittemore (surname) =

Whittemore is a surname shared by several notable people, among them being:

- Alice S. Whittemore (1936–2025), American epidemiologist and biostatistician
- Arthur Whittemore (1896–1969), Justice of the Massachusetts Supreme Judicial Court
- Benjamin Franklin Whittemore (1824–1894), American Civil War chaplain and politician
- Edward Whittemore (1933–1995), American author
- Floyd K. Whittemore (1844–1907), American businessman; Illinois State Treasurer
- Harvey Whittemore (born 1956), American lawyer and businessman
- James D. Whittemore (born 1962), American judge
- Jo Whittemore (born 1977), American author
- John Whittemore (1899–2005), American track and field athlete
- Liz Wilde (born Anne Whittemore in 1971), American radio personality
- Reed Whittemore (1919–2012), American poet
- Rodney Whittemore, American politician
- Samuel Whittemore (1694–1793), American farmer and oldest known colonial combatant in the American Revolutionary War
- Thomas Whittemore (1871–1950), American archaeologist
- Thomas Whittemore (Universalist) (1800–1861), American Universalist and politician
- William J. Whittemore (1860–1955), American painter

== See also ==
- Whitmore (surname)
