= Phil Wittmer =

American information technology specialist

Phil Wittmer is an American information technology specialist. He served as the chief information technology officer of Kansas from July 2015 to February 2, 2018. He was the chief information officer of the Virginia Information Technologies Agency from late January to February 2022.

== Career ==
Wittmer worked in for private-sector information technology companies for twenty years including as president of Lead-IT, a leadership and strategy consulting company. In July 2015, he became the chief information technology officer (CITO) of Kansas. His term ended on February 2, 2018, and he was succeeded by interim CITO Donna Shelite. Wittmer then worked for Ensono as a public sector adviser and for RSM US. In late January 2022, Wittmer was selected by Virginia governor Glenn Youngkin as the chief information officer of the Virginia Information Technologies Agency, succeeding Nelson Moe. He stepped down in February 2022 after less than month in the position.
