= Mycotic aneurysm =

- Other names: mycotic aneurysm or microbial arteritis
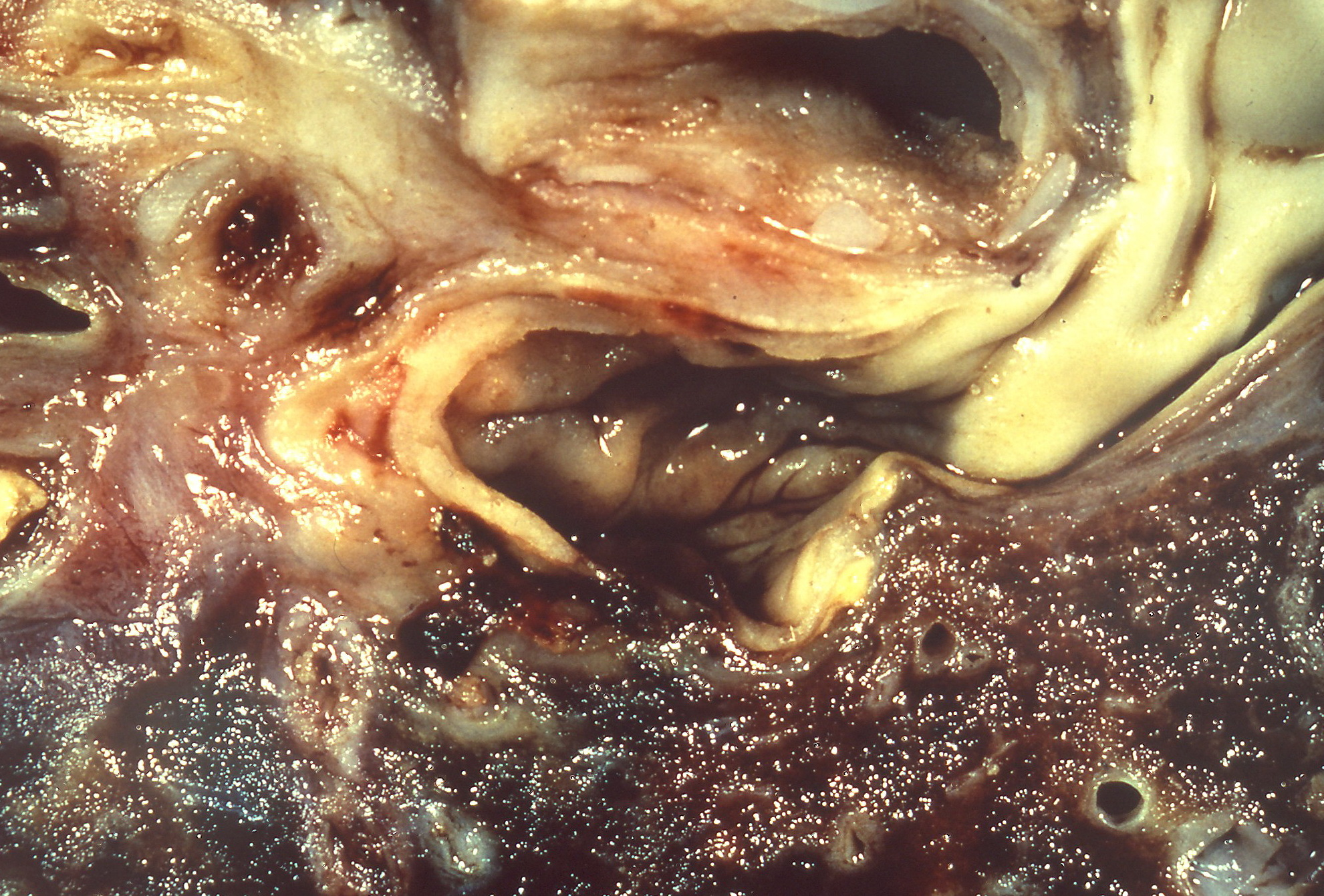
- Ruptured mycotic pulmonary artery aneurysm
- Specialty: Infectious diseases, vascular surgery

An infected aneurysm is an aneurysm arising from bacterial infection of the arterial wall. It can be a common complication of the hematogenous spread of bacterial infection.

== Cause ==
Intracranial mycotic aneurysms (ICMAs) complicate about 2% to 3% of infective endocarditis (IE) cases, although as many as 15% to 29% of patients with IE have neurologic symptoms. Staphylococcus and Salmonella spp. are the most common organisms that cause mycotic aneurysms of the aorta. Anaerobic bacteria such as Bacteroides and Clostridium spp. can also cause aortic mycotic aneurysms. Aortic aneurysm is a rare complication of Mycobacterium tuberculosis infection, most commonly from direct extension of adjacent lesions, but also as a result of hematogenous dissemination.

== Treatment ==
Mycotic abdominal aorta aneurysm (MAAA) is a rare and life-threatening condition. Because of its rarity, there is a lack of adequately powered studies and consensus on its treatment and follow up. A management protocol on the management of mycotic abdominal aortic aneurysm was recently published in the Annals of Vascular Surgery by Premnath et al.

== History ==
William Osler first used the term "mycotic aneurysm" in 1885 to describe a mushroom-shaped aneurysm in a patient with subacute bacterial endocarditis. This may create considerable confusion, since "mycotic" is typically used to define fungal infections. However, mycotic aneurysm is still used for all extracardiac or intracardiac aneurysms caused by infections, except for syphilitic aortitis.

The term "infected aneurysm" proposed by Jarrett and associates is more appropriate, since few infections involve fungi. According to some authors, a more accurate term might have been endovascular infection or infective vasculitis, because mycotic aneurysms are not due to a fungal organism.

== Complications ==
Mycotic aneurysms account for 2.6% of aortic aneurysms. For the clinician, early diagnosis is the cornerstone of effective treatment. Without medical or surgical management, catastrophic hemorrhage or uncontrolled sepsis may occur. However, symptomatology is frequently nonspecific during the early stages, so a high index of suspicion is required to make the diagnosis.
