= Wetmore =

Wetmore may refer to:

== People ==
- Alexander Wetmore (1886–1978), American ornithologist and avian paleontologist
- Andrew Rainsford Wetmore, New Brunswick politician
- Annie Beatrice van der Biest Thielan Wetmore (1910 – 1997) ornithologist and benefactor
- Charles Wetmore (winemaker), American vinter and founder of Cresta Blanca Winery
- Charles D. Wetmore, of New York architectural firm Warren and Wetmore
- Clifford Wetmore (1934–2020), American lichenologist
- Edward Ludlow Wetmore, Canadian judge and politician
- Elizabeth Whitmere (born Elizabeth Wetmore), actress
- George M. Wetmore (1858–1923), creator of Shinola shoe polish
- George P. Wetmore (1846–1921), U.S. Senator from Rhode Island
- Henry C. Wetmore (1823–1862), New York writer and politician
- James A. Wetmore, Head of the United States Office of the Supervising Architect
- James Stuart Wetmore, Episcopal bishop
- Maude A. K. Wetmore (1873-1951), American political organizer, philanthropist
- Ralph H. Wetmore (1892–1989), botanist
- Raymond S. Wetmore, American combat pilot
- Tucker Wetmore (born 1999), American country singer-songwriter
- William Wetmore, founder of Cuyahoga Falls, Ohio in 1812
- William Shepard Wetmore, Old China Trade merchant
- William Wetmore Story, American sculptor, art critic, and poet

== Places ==
- Wetmore, Staffordshire, England, near Burton upon Trent
- Wetmore, Colorado, United States
- Wetmore, Kansas, United States
- Wetmore, Michigan, United States
- Wetmore Township, Pennsylvania, United States
- Wetmore Hall, Salve Regina University

== See also ==
- Wetmore Glacier, Antarctica
- SS Charles W. Wetmore, a whaleback freighter
- Wedmore, Somerset, England, mentioned in the 1086 Domesday Book as Wetmore
