= Richland Township, Ogemaw County, Michigan =

Richland Township, Michigan
- Civil township
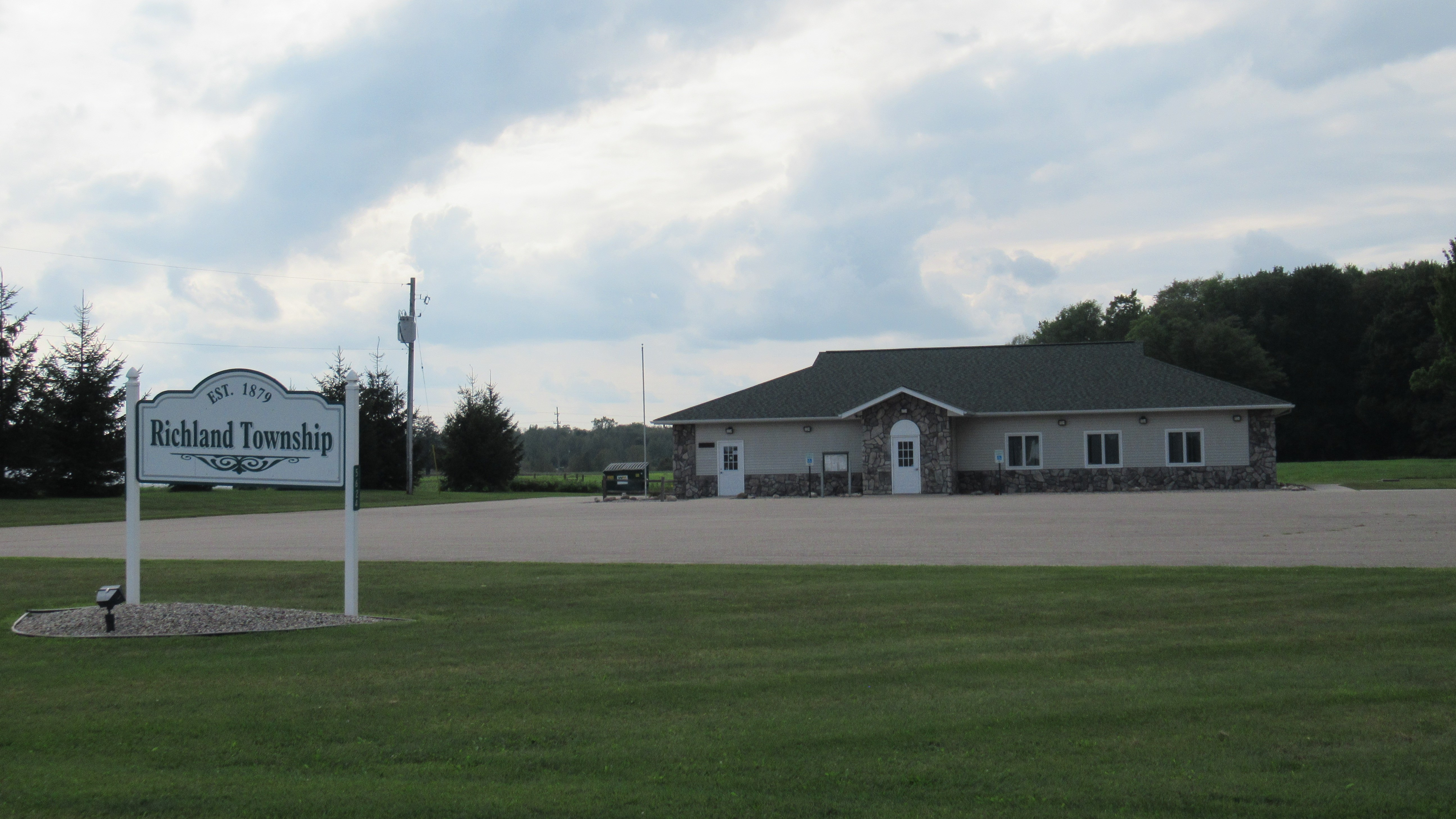
- Richland Township Hall

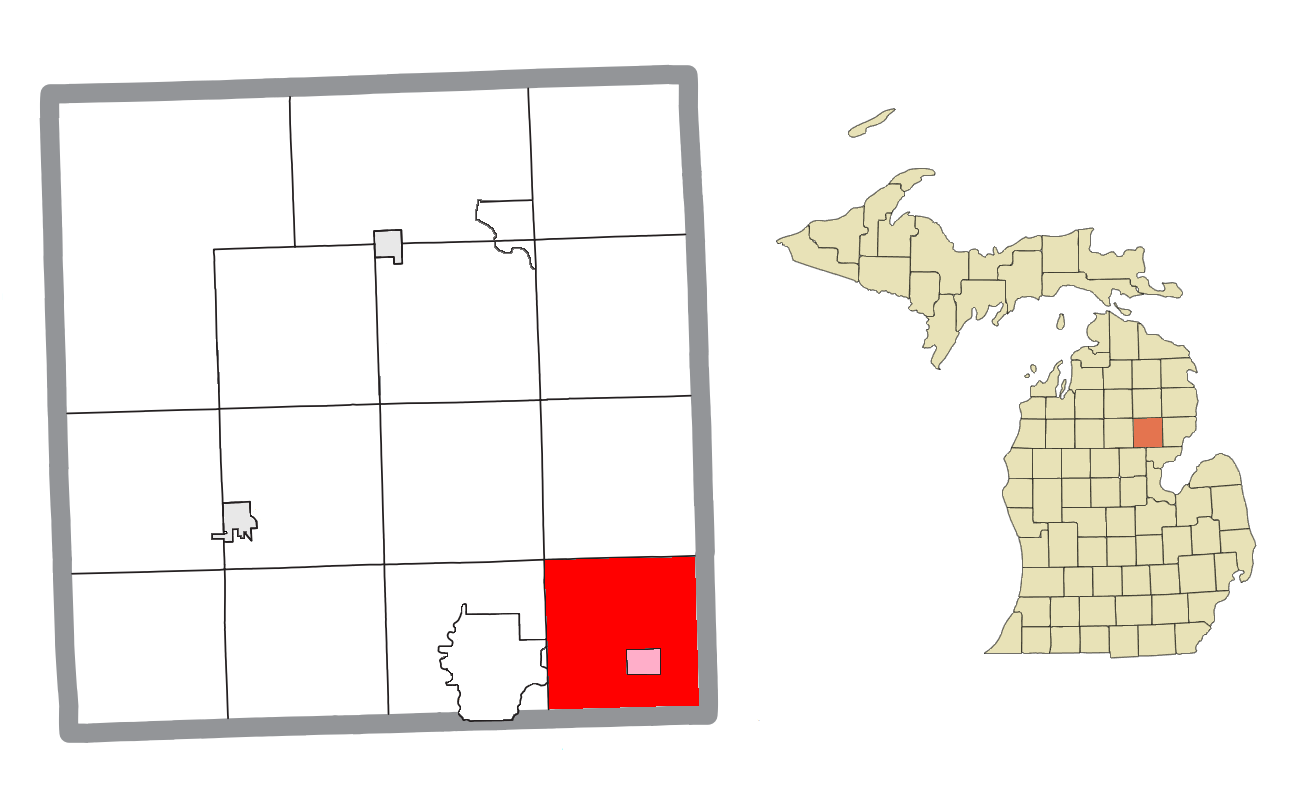
- Location within Ogemaw County (red) and the administed village of Prescott (pink)

- Location within the state of Michigan Location within the United States
- Coordinates: 44°11′45″N 83°56′24″W
- Country: United States
- State: Michigan
- County: Ogemaw
- Established: 1879

Government
  - Supervisor: Dale Bronson
  - Clerk: Dawn Johnson

Area
  - Total: 35.85 sq mi (92.85 km^{2})
  - Land: 34.78 sq mi (90.08 km^{2})
  - Water: 1.07 sq mi (2.77 km^{2})
- Elevation: 850 ft (260 m)

Population (2020)
  - Total: 827
  - Density: 23.8/sq mi (9.18/km^{2})
- Time zone: UTC-5 (Eastern (EST))
  - Summer (DST): UTC-4 (EDT)
- ZIP code(s): 48756 (Prescott)
- Area code: 989
- FIPS code: 26-68320
- GNIS feature ID: 1626973

Richland Township is a civil township of Ogemaw County in the U.S. state of Michigan. The population was 827 at the 2020 census.

== Communities ==
- Prescott is a village located within the township at 44°11′31″N 83°55′51″W.

== Geography ==
According to the U.S. Census Bureau, the township has a total area of 35.85 square miles (92.85 km^{2}), of which 34.78 square miles (90.08 km^{2}) is land and 1.07 square miles (2.77 km^{2}) (2.98%) is water.

== Demographics ==
As of the census of 2000, there were 956 people, 379 households, and 280 families residing in the township. The population density was 27.5 inhabitants per square mile (10.6/km^{2}). There were 614 housing units at an average density of 17.6 per square mile (6.8/km^{2}). The racial makeup of the township was 98.43% White, 0.52% Native American, and 1.05% from two or more races. Hispanic or Latino of any race were 2.93% of the population.

There were 379 households, out of which 25.6% had children under the age of 18 living with them, 59.4% were married couples living together, 10.0% had a female householder with no husband present, and 25.9% were non-families. 23.0% of all households were made up of individuals, and 13.7% had someone living alone who was 65 years of age or older. The average household size was 2.52 and the average family size was 2.93.

In the township the population was spread out, with 25.0% under the age of 18, 6.2% from 18 to 24, 20.9% from 25 to 44, 28.1% from 45 to 64, and 19.8% who were 65 years of age or older. The median age was 43 years. For every 100 females, there were 96.3 males. For every 100 females age 18 and over, there were 93.8 males.

The median income for a household in the township was $29,000, and the median income for a family was $33,162. Males had a median income of $29,000 versus $20,750 for females. The per capita income for the township was $13,294. About 12.7% of families and 17.4% of the population were below the poverty line, including 25.2% of those under age 18 and 15.6% of those age 65 or over.
