= Whittemore, Michigan =

- City
- City of Whittemore
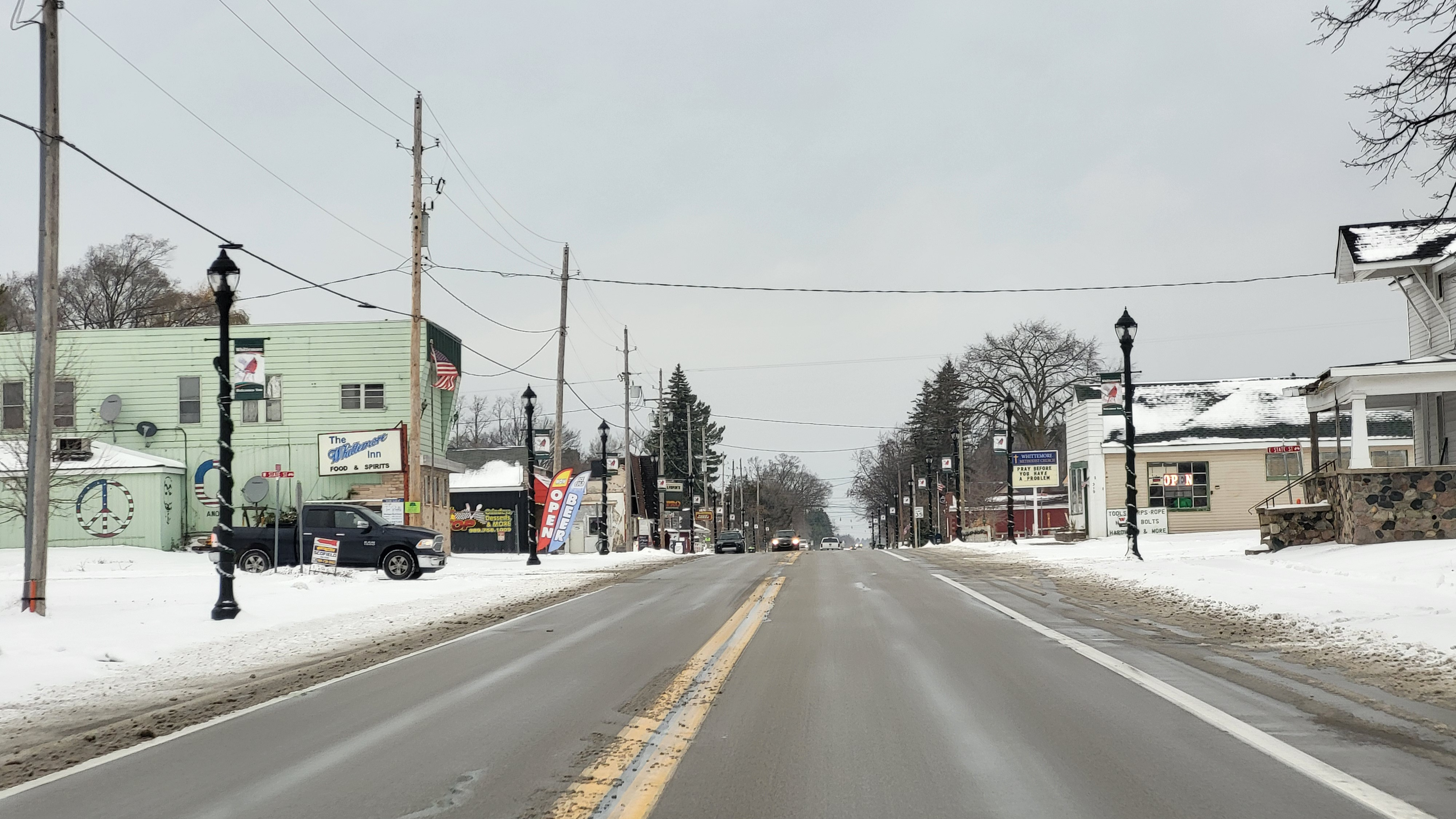
- Looking north along S. Bullock Street (M-65)

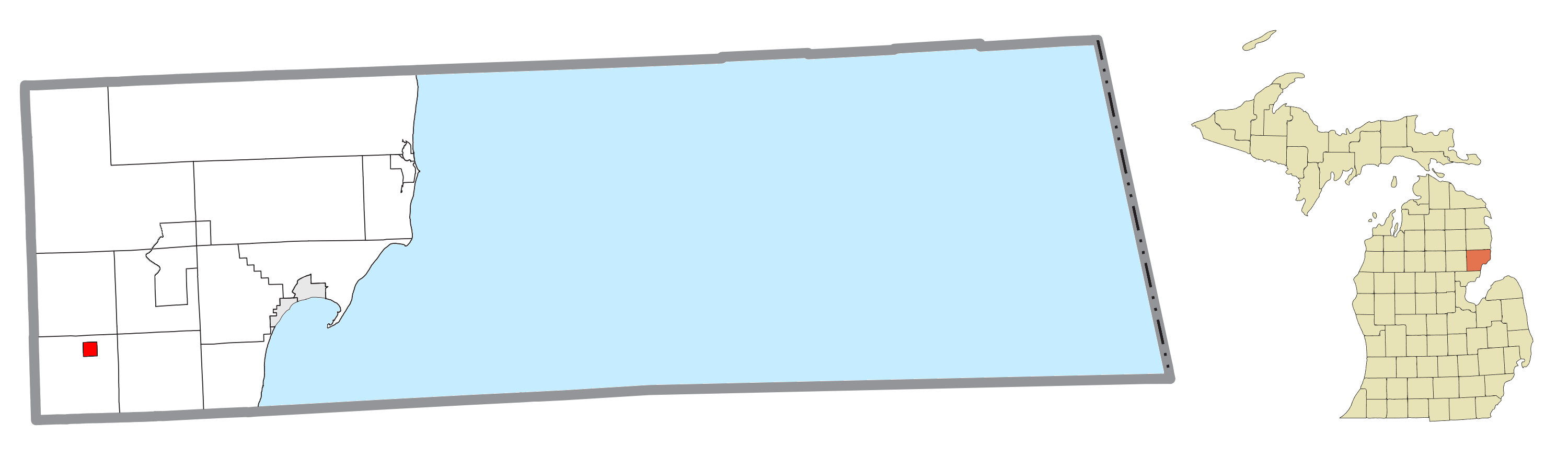
- Location within Iosco County

- Location within the state of Michigan Location within the United States
- Coordinates: 44°13′55″N 83°48′16″W
- Country: United States
- State: Michigan
- County: Iosco
- Settled: 1879
- Incorporated: 1907

Government
  - Mayor: Bob Leslie
  - Clerk: Carol Long

Area
  - Total: 1.02 sq mi (2.65 km^{2})
  - Land: 1.02 sq mi (2.65 km^{2})
  - Water: 0 sq mi (0.00 km^{2})
- Elevation: 778 ft (237 m)

Population (2020)
  - Total: 414
  - Density: 404.1/sq mi (156.03/km^{2})
- Time zone: UTC-5 (Eastern (EST))
  - Summer (DST): UTC-4 (EDT)
- ZIP code(s): 48770
- Area code: 989
- FIPS code: 26-87140
- GNIS feature ID: 1616402

Whittemore (/wɪtʌmɔːr/ WIT-uh-more) is a city in Iosco County in the U.S. state of Michigan. The population was 414 at the 2020 census, which ranks it as the fourth-least populated city in the state after Omer, Lake Angelus, and Gaastra.

== History ==
The village of Whittemore in Burleigh Township, Michigan was first settled in 1879 by David Belleknap and Shelby Sheehan, named by a group of locals after Frank Whittemore. The post office began operating on April 13, 1880. Whittemore became politically independent of the township when it incorporated as a city in 1907.

== Geography ==
According to the U.S. Census Bureau, the city has a total area of 1.02 square miles (2.64 km^{2}), all land.

=== Major highways ===
- M-65 (Bullock Street) runs south–north through the center of the city.

== Demographics ==
Historical population
Census	Pop.	Note	%±
1910	218		—
1920	232		6.4%
1930	361		55.6%
1940	420		16.3%
1950	452		7.6%
1960	460		1.8%
1970	460		0.0%
1980	438		−4.8%
1990	463		5.7%
2000	476		2.8%
2010	384		−19.3%
2020	414		7.8%
U.S. Decennial Census

=== 2010 census ===
As of the census of 2010, there were 384 people, 183 households, and 96 families residing in the city. The population density was 387.9 inhabitants per square mile (149.8/km^{2}). There were 226 housing units at an average density of 228.3 per square mile (88.1/km^{2}). The racial makeup of the city was 94.8% White, 1.3% African American, 0.5% Native American, 1.3% from other races, and 2.1% from two or more races. Hispanic or Latino of any race were 3.1% of the population.

There were 183 households, of which 21.9% had children under the age of 18 living with them, 37.7% were married couples living together, 9.3% had a female householder with no husband present, 5.5% had a male householder with no wife present, and 47.5% were non-families. 39.3% of all households were made up of individuals, and 15.3% had someone living alone who was 65 years of age or older. The average household size was 2.10 and the average family size was 2.79.

The median age in the city was 47 years. 19% of residents were under the age of 18; 7.8% were between the ages of 18 and 24; 21.1% were from 25 to 44; 33.1% were from 45 to 64; and 19% were 65 years of age or older. The gender makeup of the city was 45.3% male and 54.7% female.

=== 2000 census ===
As of the census of 2000, there were 476 people, 197 households, and 127 families residing in the city. The population density was 483.1 inhabitants per square mile (186.5/km^{2}). There were 225 housing units at an average density of 228.4 per square mile (88.2/km^{2}). The racial makeup of the city was 98.74% White, 0.42% African American and 0.84% Native American. Hispanic or Latino of any race were 1.26% of the population.

There were 197 households, out of which 34.0% had children under the age of 18 living with them, 41.6% were married couples living together, 15.7% had a female householder with no husband present, and 35.5% were non-families. 32.0% of all households were made up of individuals, and 20.8% had someone living alone who was 65 years of age or older. The average household size was 2.42 and the average family size was 2.96.

In the city, the population was spread out, with 28.6% under the age of 18, 8.4% from 18 to 24, 26.5% from 25 to 44, 19.3% from 45 to 64, and 17.2% who were 65 years of age or older. The median age was 36 years. For every 100 females, there were 86.7 males. For every 100 females age 18 and over, there were 78.9 males.

The median income for a household in the city was $22,500, and the median income for a family was $26,375. Males had a median income of $26,875 versus $17,083 for females. The per capita income for the city was $12,175. About 21.1% of families and 24.6% of the population were below the poverty line, including 34.7% of those under age 18 and 13.3% of those age 65 or over.

== Attractions ==
Whittemore Speedway is a racetrack located in the city of Whittemore, and it is Michigan's longest continuously running race track.

== Education ==
The city is served entirely by Whittemore-Prescott Area Schools.

Shady Grove School is a private Amish elementary school serving approximately 20 students in grades 1–8.
