= Alfred Whitmore =

English pathologist

Major Alfred Whitmore (16 May 1876–1946) was an English pathologist who, together with C.S. Krishnaswami, identified Burkholderia pseudomallei, the causative agent of melioidosis (also known as "Whitmore's disease"), in opium addicts in Rangoon in 1911. He differentiated it from Burkholderia mallei, the causative agent of glanders, by clinical and microbiological features.

He was initially a Captain, and later a Major, in the Indian Medical Service. Later, he also became director of the Rangoon Medical School.

== Selected publications ==
- Whitmore, A.; Krishnaswami, C. S. (July 1912). "A Hitherto Undescribed Infective Disease in Rangoon". The Indian Medical Gazette. 47 (7): 262–267. ISSN 0019-5863. PMC 5168169. PMID 29005374.
