= Prescott, Michigan =

- Village
- Village of Prescott
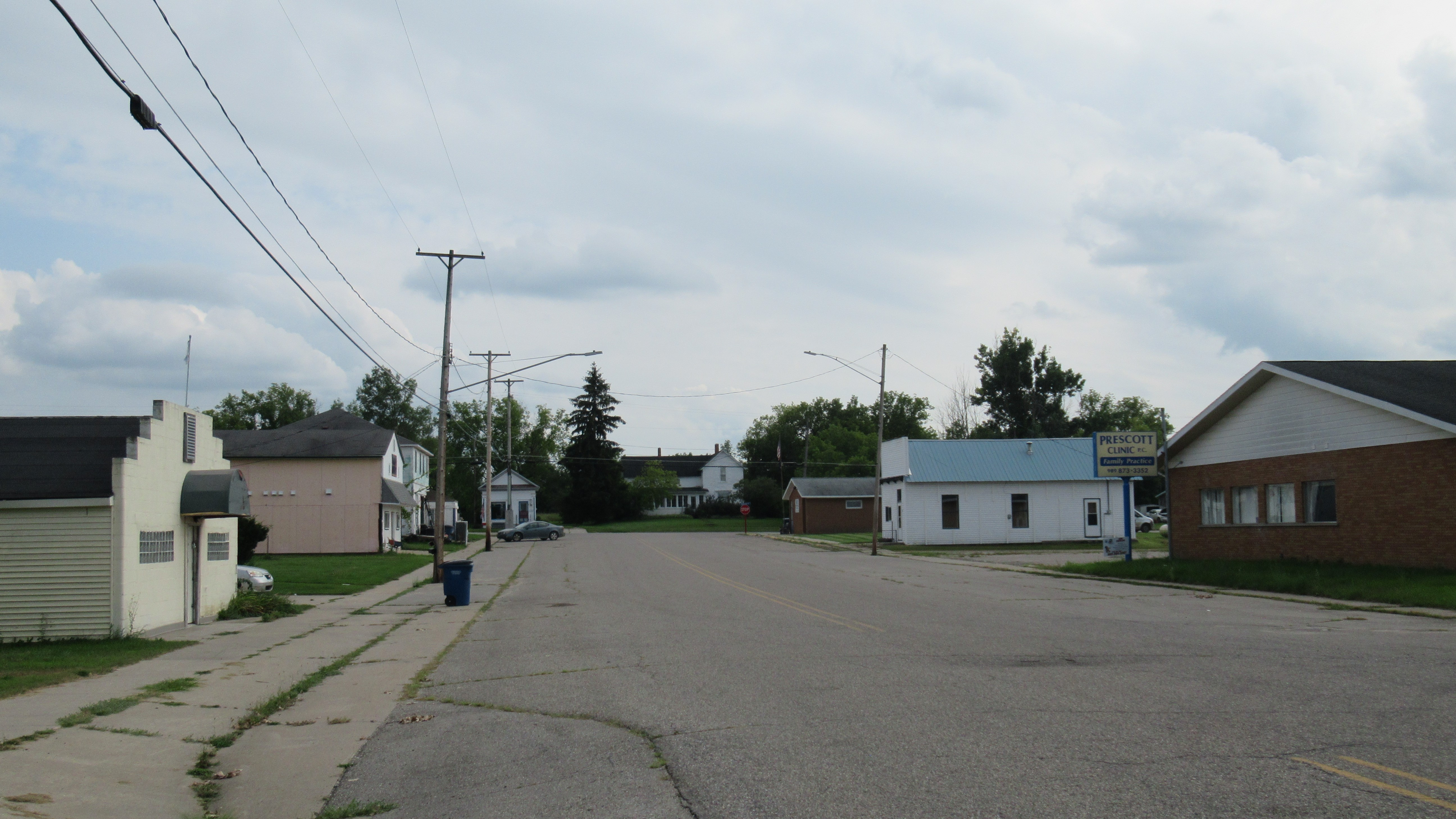
- Looking south along Washington Street

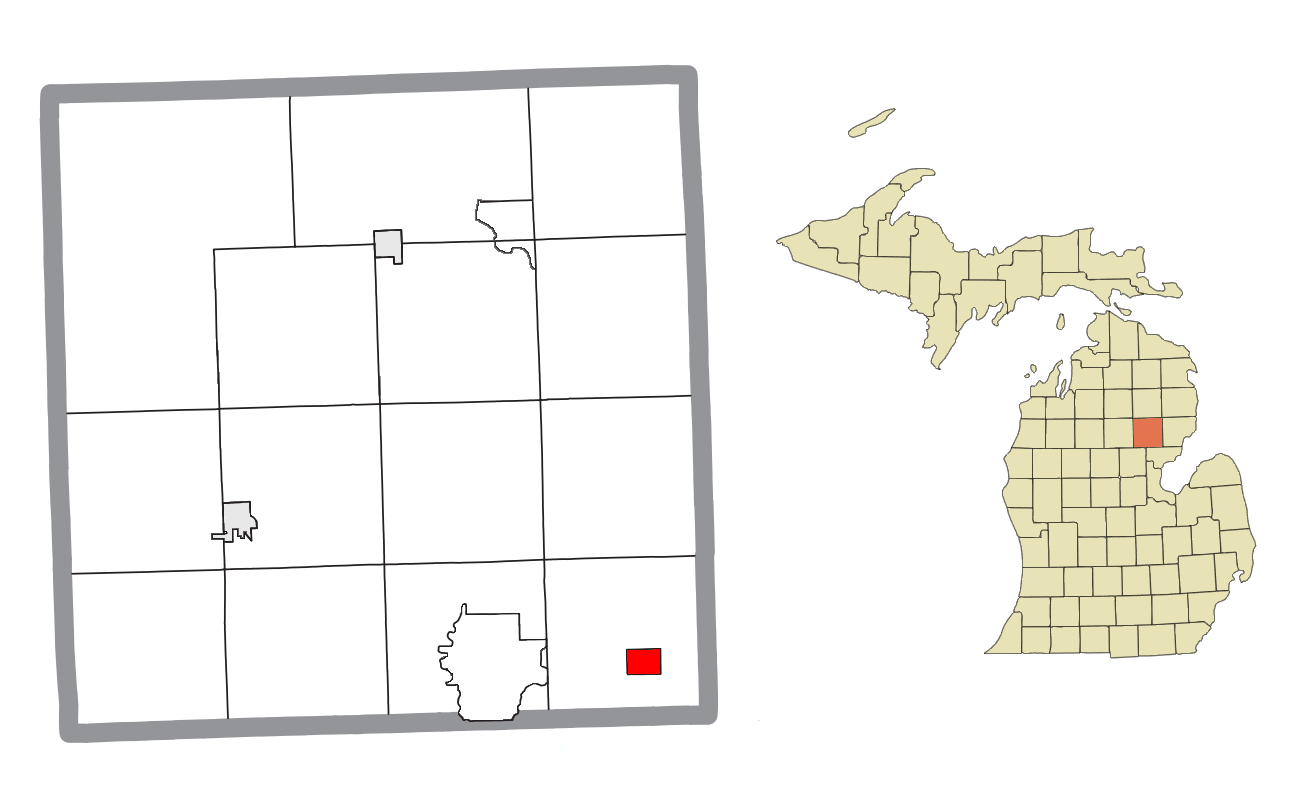
- Location within Ogemaw County

- Location within the state of Michigan Location within the United States
- Coordinates: 44°11′30″N 83°55′56″W
- Country: United States
- State: Michigan
- County: Ogemaw
- Settled: 1882
- Platted: October 30, 1888

Government
  - Type: Village council
  - President: Peggy Mashke
  - Clerk: Darla Best

Area
  - Total: 1.11 sq mi (2.87 km^{2})
  - Land: 1.11 sq mi (2.87 km^{2})
  - Water: 0 sq mi (0.00 km^{2})
- Elevation: 797 ft (243 m)

Population (2020)
  - Total: 217
  - Density: 195.6/sq mi (75.54/km^{2})
- Time zone: UTC-5 (Eastern (EST))
  - Summer (DST): UTC-4 (EDT)
- ZIP code(s): 48756
- Area code: 989
- FIPS code: 26-66300
- GNIS feature ID: 2399022

Prescott is a village in Ogemaw County of the U.S. state of Michigan. As of the 2020 census, Prescott had a population of 217. The village is located within Richland Township.

== Geography ==
According to the U.S. Census Bureau, the village has a total area of 1.11 square miles (2.87 km^{2}), all land.

== Demographics ==
Historical population
Census	Pop.	Note	%±
1950	281		—
1960	308		9.6%
1970	306		−0.6%
1980	332		8.5%
1990	314		−5.4%
2000	286		−8.9%
2010	266		−7.0%
2020	217		−18.4%
U.S. Decennial Census

=== 2010 census ===
As of the census of 2010, there were 266 people, 101 households, and 70 families living in the village. The population density was 239.6 inhabitants per square mile (92.5/km^{2}). There were 131 housing units at an average density of 118.0 per square mile (45.6/km^{2}). The racial makeup of the village was 96.6% White, 0.4% from other races, and 3.0% from two or more races. Hispanic or Latino of any race were 3.8% of the population.

There were 101 households, of which 30.7% had children under the age of 18 living with them, 48.5% were married couples living together, 13.9% had a female householder with no husband present, 6.9% had a male householder with no wife present, and 30.7% were non-families. 26.7% of all households were made up of individuals, and 18.8% had someone living alone who was 65 years of age or older. The average household size was 2.63 and the average family size was 3.11.

The median age in the village was 43 years. 23.7% of residents were under the age of 18; 6% were between the ages of 18 and 24; 23.3% were from 25 to 44; 28.2% were from 45 to 64; and 18.8% were 65 years of age or older. The gender makeup of the village was 46.2% male and 53.8% female.

=== 2000 census ===
As of the census of 2000, there were 286 people, 111 households, and 75 families living in the village. The population density was 244.2 inhabitants per square mile (94.3/km^{2}). There were 130 housing units at an average density of 111.0 per square mile (42.9/km^{2}). The racial makeup of the village was 99.65% White and 0.35% Native American. Hispanic or Latino of any race were 2.10% of the population.

There were 111 households, out of which 30.6% had children under the age of 18 living with them, 55.0% were married couples living together, 11.7% had a female householder with no husband present, and 32.4% were non-families. 28.8% of all households were made up of individuals, and 13.5% had someone living alone who was 65 years of age or older. The average household size was 2.58 and the average family size was 3.19.

In the village, the population was spread out, with 29.0% under the age of 18, 7.0% from 18 to 24, 23.1% from 25 to 44, 24.8% from 45 to 64, and 16.1% who were 65 years of age or older. The median age was 38 years. For every 100 females, there were 85.7 males. For every 100 females age 18 and over, there were 86.2 males.

The median income for a household in the village was $27,188, and the median income for a family was $30,000. Males had a median income of $22,500 versus $23,750 for females. The per capita income for the village was $11,014. About 20.7% of families and 26.9% of the population were below the poverty line, including 39.0% of those under the age of eighteen and 11.8% of those 65 or over.

== Images ==
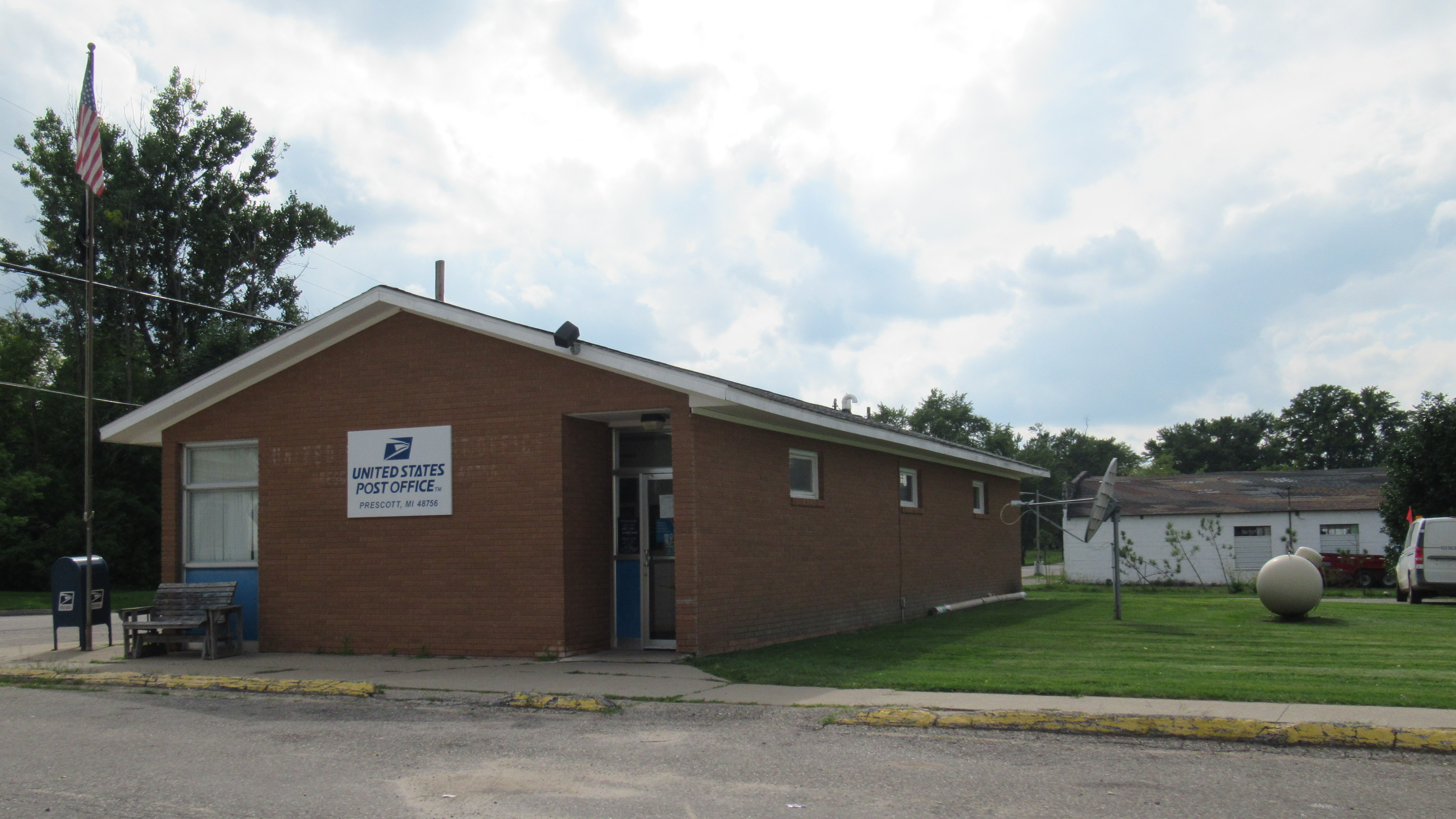
U.S. Post Office in Prescott

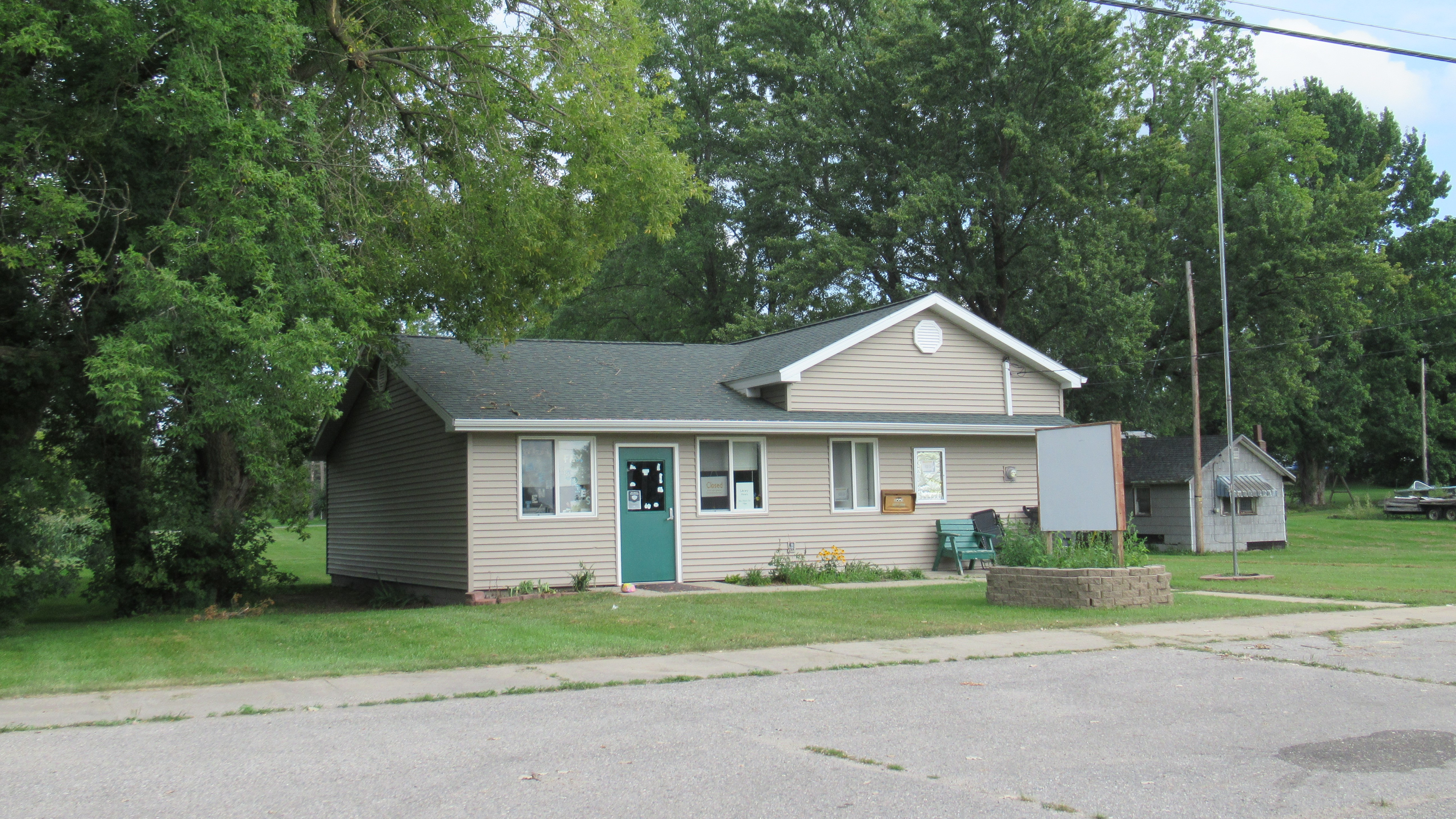
Ogemaw District Library

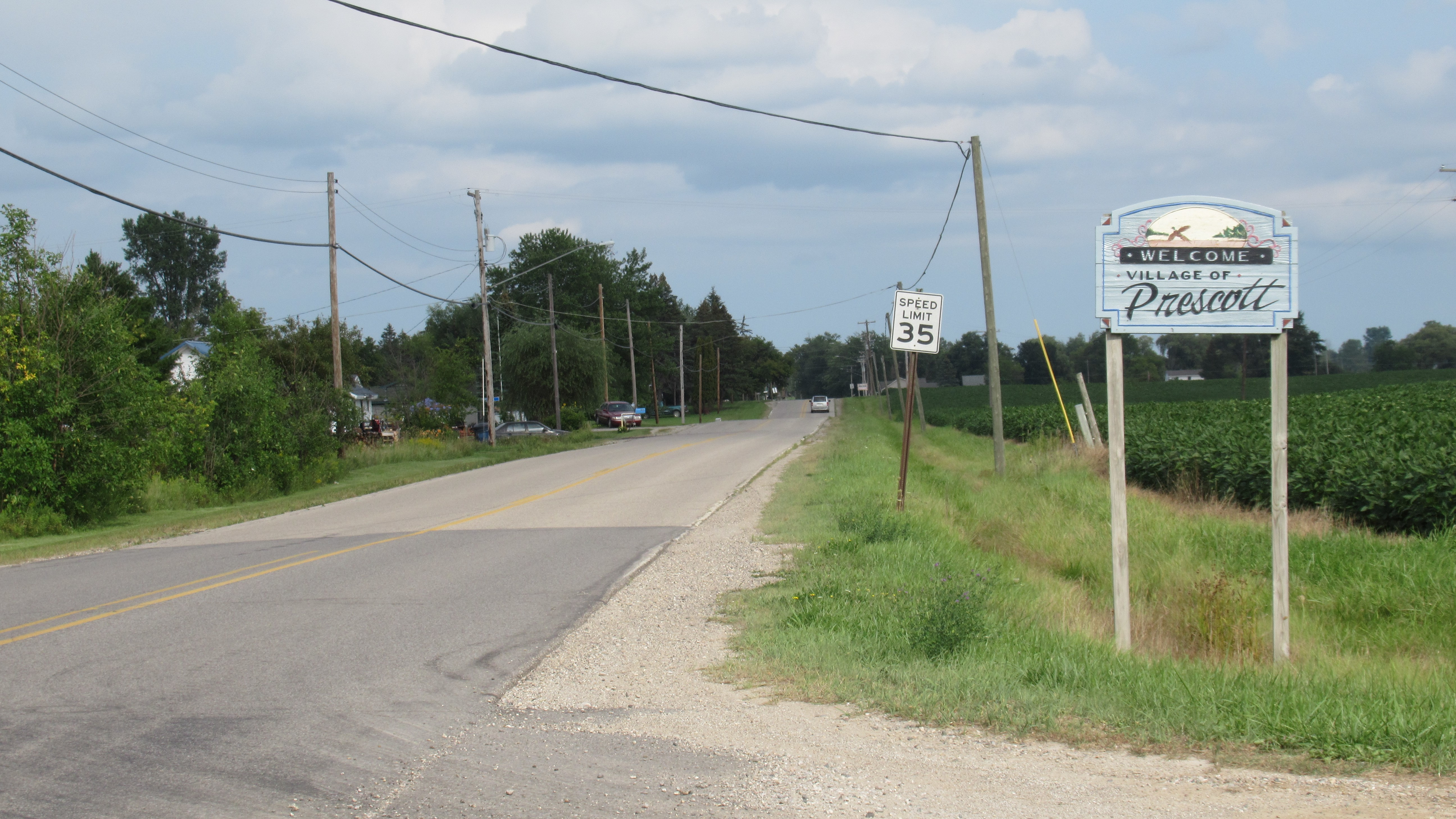
Looking east along Harrison Road
