= Tawas Area Schools =

School district in Michigan, United States

Address
- 245 West M-55 Tawas City, Iosco County, Michigan, 48763; United States

District information
- Grades: PreKindergarten–12
- Superintendent: Sarah Danek
- Schools: 3
- Budget: $15,888,000 2022-2023 expenditures
- NCES District ID: 2633510

Students and staff
- Students: 1,124 (2024-2025)
- Teachers: 60.72 (on an FTE basis) (2024-2025)
- Staff: 140.98 FTE (2024-2025)
- Student–teacher ratio: 18.51 (2024-2025)
- District mascot: Braves

Other information
- Website: www.tawas.net

Tawas Area Schools is a public school district in Northern Michigan. In Iosco County, it serves Tawas City, East Tawas, the townships of Alabaster, Baldwin, and Tawas, and parts of the townships of Au Sable, Grant, Sherman, and Wilber. In Arenac County, it serves part Whitney Township.

== History ==
Tawas City's first school was established in 1863 above a store. In 1868, a dedicated schoolhouse was built.

In 1952, thirteen school districts merged to form Tawas Area Schools. The new district set to creating a merged high school. In February 1954, a full-page advertisement was purchased in The Bay City Times asking voters to approve the new Tawas Area High School. High school students began using the new high school in February 1957, with junior high students to begin attending in fall 1957. The architect was H.E. Beyster and Associates.

One of the districts that consolidated contained Alabaster School in Alabaster Township, built in 1924. It also held a high school, which closed in 1944. As an elementary school in Tawas Area Schools, it closed in October 1962.

Clara B. Bolen Elementary opened in fall 1991, and was named after a long-serving teacher in the district.

== Schools ==
Schools in Tawas Area Schools district share a campus on M-55 on the west side of Tawas City.

Schools in Tawas Area Schools district
School	Address	Notes
Tawas Area High School	255 W M-55, Tawas City	Grades 9–12. Built 1957.
Tawas Area Middle School	255 W M-55, Tawas City	Grades 5-8. Shares a building with Tawas Area High School.
Clara B. Bolen Elementary	211 S Plank Road, Tawas City	Grades PreK-4. Built 1991.
