= Hale Area Schools =

Public school district in Michigan

Address
- 311 North Washington Street Hale, Michigan, 48739; United States

District information
- Grades: K-12
- Superintendent: Jeffery Yorke
- Schools: 1

Students and staff
- Enrollment: 334 (2021-22)
- Teachers: 23.01 (on an FTE basis)
- Staff: 50.44 (on an FTE basis)
- Student–teacher ratio: 14.52

Other information
- Website: www.haleschools.net

Hale Area Schools is a public school district in the U.S. state of Michigan serving pre school through twelfth grade, and draws its approximately 831 students from the townships of Plainfield, Reno, and Grant in Iosco County as well as Hill and Logan townships in Ogemaw County.

The district includes Hale Elementary School (K-4), Hale Middle School (5-8), and Hale High School (9-12).

The Hale High School has an all-girls volleyball team called the Lady Eagles.
