= Oscoda =

Oscoda may refer to:

- Oscoda, Michigan, an unincorporated community in Iosco County
- Oscoda County, Michigan
- Oscoda Township, Michigan, in Iosco County
