= Baldwin Township, Michigan =

Baldwin Township, Michigan may refer to:

- Baldwin Township, Delta County, Michigan
- Baldwin Township, Iosco County, Michigan

== See also ==
- Baldwin, Michigan, a village in Lake County
- Baldwin Township (disambiguation)
