= Sherman Township, Iosco County, Michigan =

Sherman Township, Michigan
- Civil township
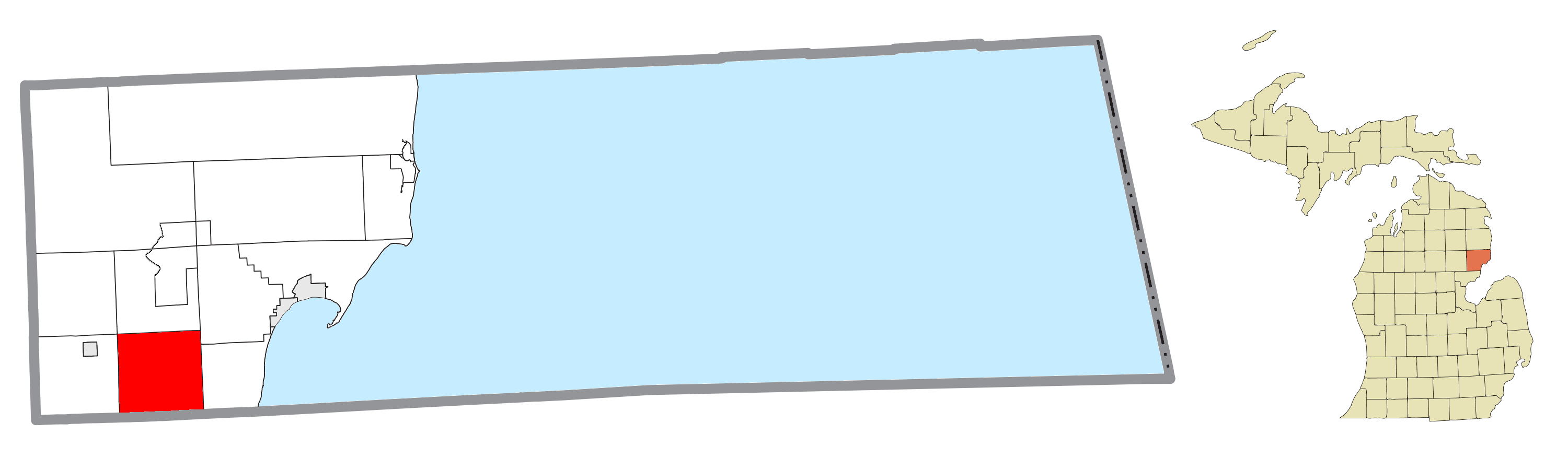
- Location within Iosco County

- Location within the state of Michigan Location within the United States
- Coordinates: 44°12′3″N 83°41′51″W
- Country: United States
- State: Michigan
- County: Iosco

Area
  - Total: 35.9 sq mi (93.0 km^{2})
  - Land: 35.9 sq mi (93.0 km^{2})
  - Water: 0 sq mi (0.0 km^{2})
- Elevation: 633 ft (193 m)

Population (2020)
  - Total: 431
  - Density: 12.0/sq mi (4.63/km^{2})
- Time zone: UTC-5 (Eastern (EST))
  - Summer (DST): UTC-4 (EDT)
- ZIP code(s): 48748 (National City); 48763 (Tawas City); 48765 (Turner); 48770 (Whittemore)
- FIPS code: 26-73180
- GNIS feature ID: 1627072
- Website: https://shermantwp.org/

Sherman Township is a civil township of Iosco County in the U.S. state of Michigan. The population was 448 at the 2010 census and slightly decreased to 431 at the 2020 census.

== Communities ==
- National City is an unincorporated community in the township at 44°14′03″N 83°43′24″W. The settlement began as a flag station on the Bay City and Alpena Railroad in 1884. It was at first called "Emery Junction", a junction between branches on the Detroit and Mackinac Railway located just west of the present National City. A post office named Emery Junction was established on March 21, 1904, with Quincy Martin as the first postmaster. In 1925, the National Gypsum Company opened a quarry nearby, and the name of the post office was changed to National City in 1926. The National City post office, with ZIP code 48748, provides service to a portion of Sherman Township, as well as to another discontinuous area in Grant, Plainfield, Wilber, and Tawas townships to the north.
- The city of Tawas City is to the northeast, and the Tawas City post office, with ZIP code 48763, also serves portions of northeastern Sherman Township.
- The community of Turner is to the south in Arenac County, and the Turner post office, with ZIP code 48765, also serves portions of southern Sherman Township.
- The village of Whittemore is to the west, and the Whittemore post office, with ZIP code 48770, also serves portions of Sherman Township.

== Geography ==
According to the United States Census Bureau, the township has a total area of 35.9 square miles (93.0 km^{2}), all land.

== Demographics ==
As of the census of 2000, there were 493 people, 200 households, and 140 families residing in the township. The population density was 13.7 per square mile (5.3/km^{2}). There were 319 housing units at an average density of 8.9 per square mile (3.4/km^{2}). The racial makeup of the township was 96.96% White, 0.41% African American, 0.61% Native American, 0.20% Asian, and 1.83% from two or more races. Hispanic or Latino of any race were 2.03% of the population.

There were 200 households, out of which 24.0% had children under the age of 18 living with them, 58.0% were married couples living together, 7.0% had a female householder with no husband present, and 30.0% were non-families. 28.0% of all households were made up of individuals, and 13.0% had someone living alone who was 65 years of age or older. The average household size was 2.47 and the average family size was 2.94.

In the township the population was spread out, with 23.3% under the age of 18, 5.9% from 18 to 24, 25.4% from 25 to 44, 25.8% from 45 to 64, and 19.7% who were 65 years of age or older. The median age was 42 years. For every 100 females, there were 101.2 males. For every 100 females age 18 and over, there were 101.1 males.

The median income for a household in the township was $40,547, and the median income for a family was $43,438. Males had a median income of $31,786 versus $21,406 for females. The per capita income for the township was $18,432. About 6.6% of families and 10.8% of the population were below the poverty line, including 21.8% of those under age 18 and none of those age 65 or over.
