= Tawas Point State Park =

Park in Michigan, United States

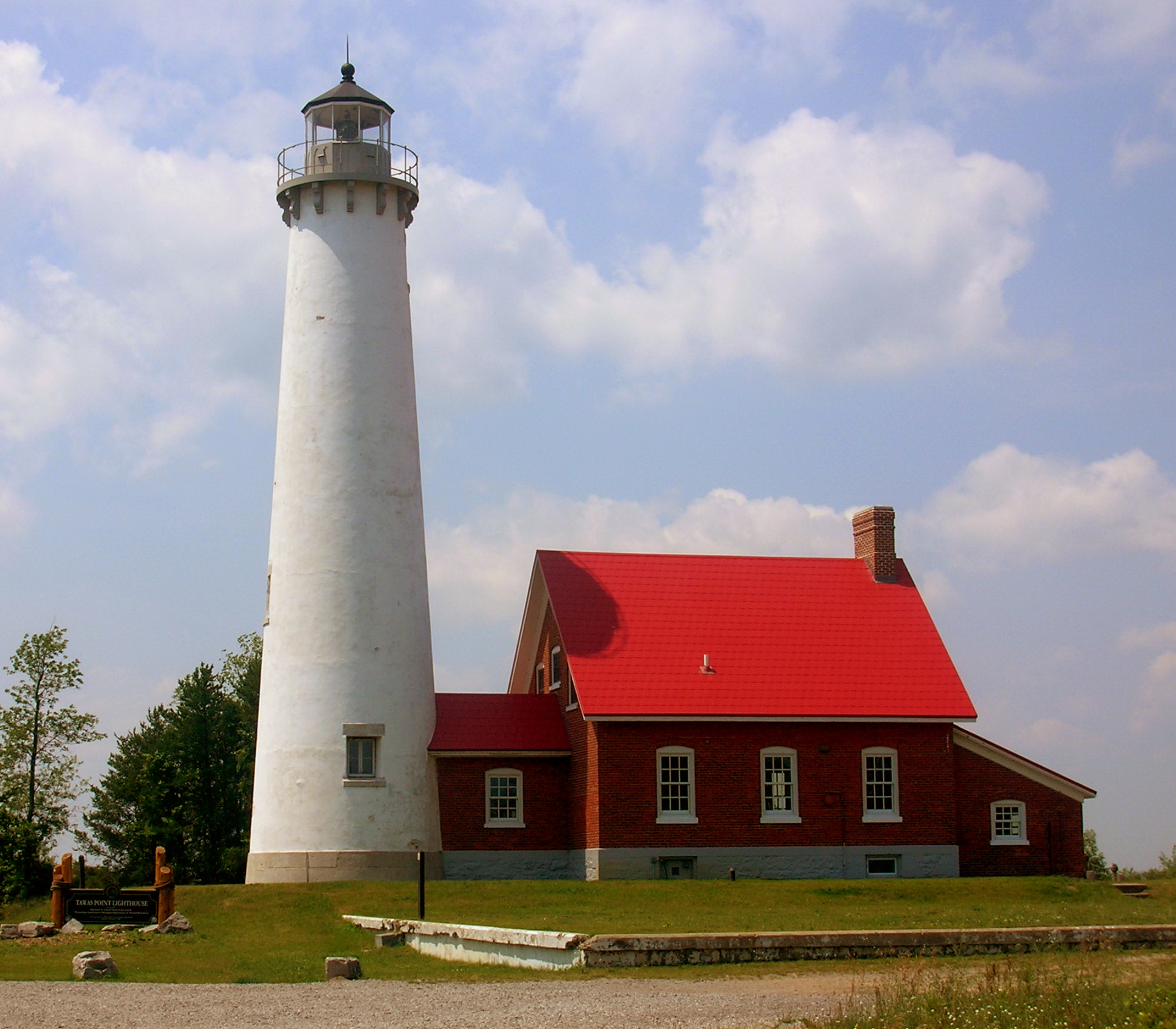
- Tawas Point Light

- Location within Michigan Location within the United States
- Location: Baldwin Township, Iosco County, Michigan, United States
- Nearest city: East Tawas, Michigan
- Coordinates: 44°14′55″N 83°27′29″W
- Area: 183 acres (74 ha)
- Elevation: 584 feet (178 m)
- Established: 1960
- Administrator: Michigan Department of Natural Resources
- Designation: Michigan state park
- Website: www.michigan.gov/recsearch/parks/TawasPoint

Tawas Point State Park is a public recreation area located on Lake Huron in Northern Michigan near the city of East Tawas, Michigan. The state park encompasses 183 acres (74 ha) at the end of a sand spit that forms Tawas Bay. It has been referred to as the "Cape Cod of the Midwest" and is a notable bird-watching site. The park is home to the Tawas Point Light, which, although it has been remodeled several times, serves as the sole representative of a true Victorian-era style station built on the Great Lakes.

== History ==
The park was created after the lighthouse property was declared surplus by the United States Government. The 1960 Michigan state legislature authorized the purchase of 175 acres on Tawas Point for $29,250. Development of the park began in 1964, with the park officially opening in 1966. A beach pavilion was added to the site in 1993. The Department of Natural Resources took ownership of the lighthouse for historic monument purposes in 2001, and a year later removed the assistant lighthouse keeper's house that had been built in 1922.

== Birding ==
Described as a "bird watchers' paradise," the park is located along the Lake Huron Flyway. It is said to be the most important "migrant trap" in the Saginaw Bay area. Some 300 species of migratory birds have been seen in and around the park. The park has been recognized as an important bird area by the National Audubon Society because it "[s]upports an incredible diversity and abundance of passerine migrants each spring and fall."

== Activities and amenities ==
The park features a campground on Tawas Bay and water that is shallow and warm for swimming along two miles of sandy beach. The lighthouse is open seasonally for tours and climbing. (Note: For years, Tawas Point Celebration Days, held the second weekend in June, celebrated American cultural heritage with activities including historical and educational displays, demonstrations of traditional crafts, muzzle loader demonstrations, and encampments with reenactors in period dress. Alas, no more. The weekend was sponsored by the Friends of Tawas Point State Park.)
