= Au Sable Township, Iosco County, Michigan =

Au Sable Township, Michigan
- Charter township
- Charter Township of Au Sable
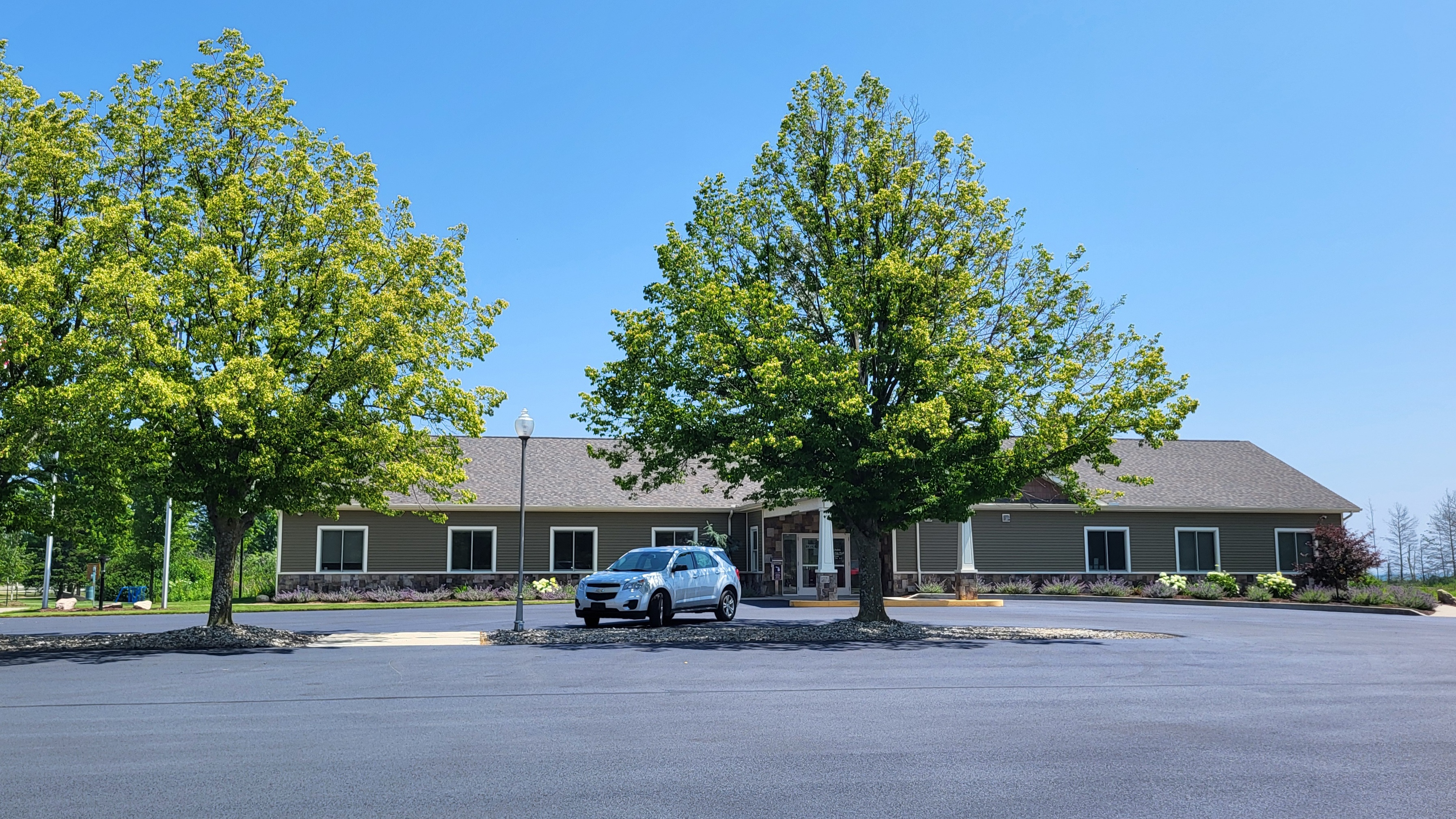
- Au Sable Township Hall

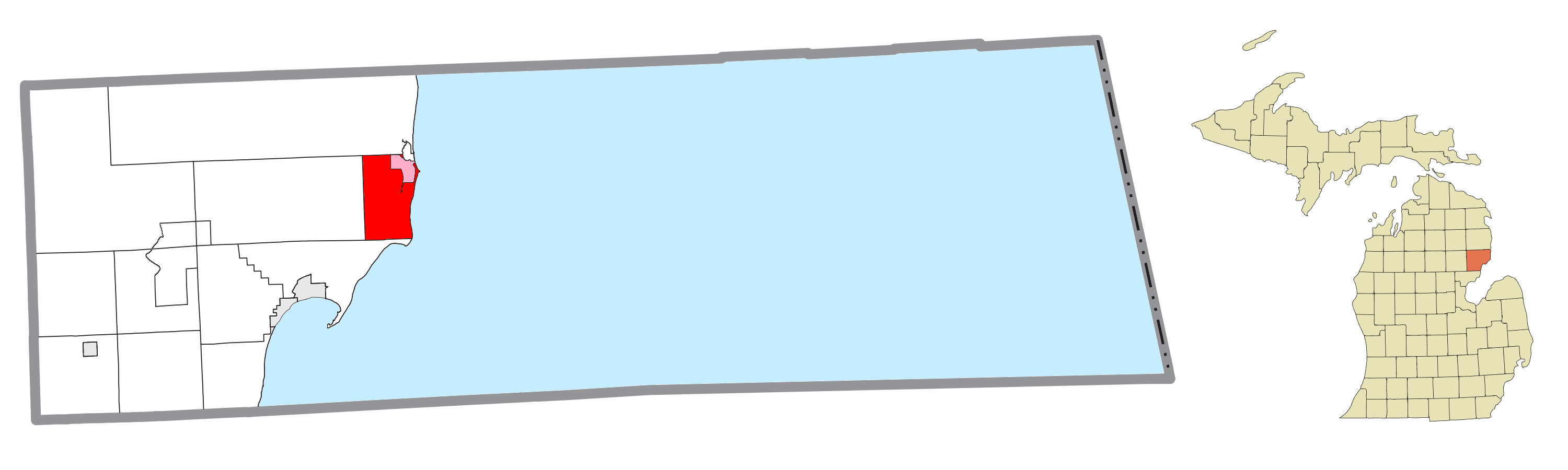
- Location within Iosco County (red) and the administered CDP of Au Sable (pink)

- Location within the state of Michigan Location within the United States
- Coordinates: 44°23′26″N 83°20′42″W
- Country: United States
- State: Michigan
- County: Iosco
- Established: 1848

Government
  - Supervisor: Kevin Beliveau
  - Clerk: Kelly Graham

Area
  - Total: 21.12 sq mi (54.70 km^{2})
  - Land: 20.63 sq mi (53.43 km^{2})
  - Water: 0.49 sq mi (1.27 km^{2})
- Elevation: 610 ft (186 m)

Population (2020)
  - Total: 2,016
  - Density: 99.2/sq mi (38.3/km^{2})
- Time zone: UTC-5 (Eastern (EST))
  - Summer (DST): UTC-4 (EDT)
- ZIP code(s): 48730 (East Tawas); 48750 (Oscoda)
- Area code: 989
- FIPS code: 26-04300
- GNIS feature ID: 1625865
- Website: Official website

Au Sable Township is a charter township of Iosco County in the U.S. state of Michigan. The population was 2,016 at the 2020 census.

== Communities ==
- Au Sable is an unincorporated community and census-designated place (CDP) located within the township at 44°24′39″N 83°19′56″W.
- Oscoda is an unincorporated community and census-designated place that is mostly located within Oscoda Township to the north at 44°25′13″N 83°19′51″W. Only a very small portion of the CDP extends into Au Sable Township.

== History ==
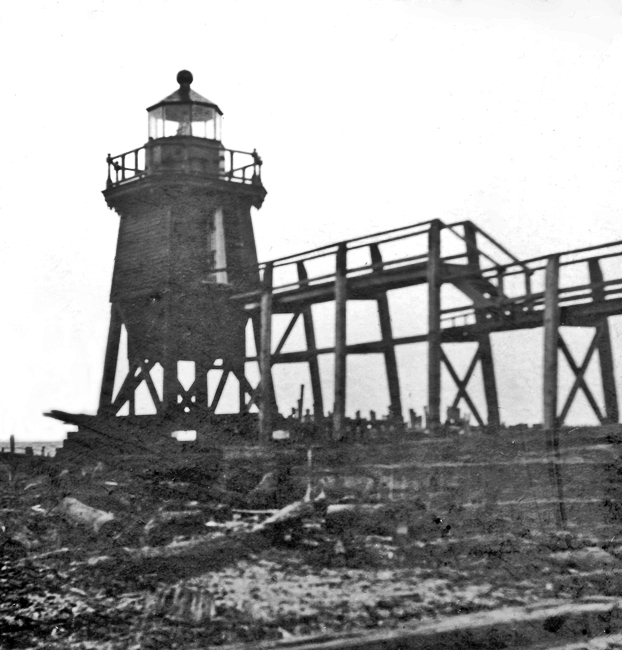
Historic image of the Au Sable North Pierhead Light (1904)

The area was originally inhabited by the Chippewa Native Americans, who used the area for hunting and fishing. They ceded the area to the federal government under the Treaty of Saginaw in 1819. The first European settler to claim land was French-Canadian fur trader Louis Chevalier, and he established a trading post slightly upstream along the Au Sable River, which was translated from the French language "river of sand." The area became popular for hunters, fishermen, and trappers. In 1848, the township was established, and the community of Au Sable was platted in 1849 at the river mouth along Lake Huron. The township was later organized in 1857 under the name Sable when Iosco County was formally organized, and the township name was changed to AuSable in 1877.

The community of Au Sable became the center of population and incorporated as an autonomous city in 1889. The new city had a population of 4,828 at the 1890 census, while Au Sable Township remained sparsely populated and only had a population of 170. Along with neighboring Oscoda, the area became part of the thriving lumber region. After the lumber industry declined, the population dwindled, and Au Sable and Oscoda suffered a devastating fire in 1911. The city of Au Sable never recovered and surrendered its city charter in 1931 and returned to township control.

Due to its location along the Au Sable River and Lake Huron coastline, a lighthouse was established at the river mouth to aid ships that were used to transport the large lumber supplies. The Au Sable Pierhead Lighthouse was commissioned in 1873. The lighthouse survived the devastating 1911 fire, but the surrounding area was destroyed. A newer skeletal tower was constructed in 1912 and later automated in 1940. The tower was deactivated and removed in 1957. It then sat on the grounds of the Oscoda Yacht Club and fell into desrepair. It was eventually restored and erected near U.S. Route 23 at the Huron Shores Artisan Hall just to the north in Oscoda Township.

== Geography ==
According to the U.S. Census Bureau, the township has a total area of 21.12 square miles (54.70 km^{2}), of which 20.63 square miles (53.43 km^{2}) is land and 0.49 square miles (1.27 km^{2}) (2.32%) is water.

The Au Sable River runs through the northeast boundary and has its river mouth at Lake Huron within the township.

=== Major highways ===
- US 23 runs south–north along the eastern edge of the township near Lake Huron.

== Demographics ==
As of the census of 2000, there were 2,230 people, 956 households, and 636 families residing in the township. The population density was 108.2 inhabitants per square mile (41.8/km^{2}). There were 1,498 housing units at an average density of 72.7 per square mile (28.1/km^{2}). The racial makeup of the township was 96.50% White, 0.85% African American, 0.27% Native American, 0.27% Asian, 0.31% from other races, and 1.79% from two or more races. Hispanic or Latino of any race were 1.30% of the population.

There were 956 households, out of which 27.8% had children under the age of 18 living with them, 54.3% were married couples living together, 8.4% had a female householder with no husband present, and 33.4% were non-families. 28.2% of all households were made up of individuals, and 13.6% had someone living alone who was 65 years of age or older. The average household size was 2.32 and the average family size was 2.81.

In the township the population was spread out, with 23.5% under the age of 18, 5.2% from 18 to 24, 25.2% from 25 to 44, 26.3% from 45 to 64, and 19.7% who were 65 years of age or older. The median age was 42 years. For every 100 females, there were 100.4 males. For every 100 females age 18 and over, there were 100.1 males.

The median income for a household in the township was $34,570, and the median income for a family was $38,462. Males had a median income of $27,415 versus $19,216 for females. The per capita income for the township was $20,025. About 9.3% of families and 12.3% of the population were below the poverty line, including 19.0% of those under age 18 and 10.3% of those age 65 or over.

== Education ==
Au Sable Township is served by two separate public school districts. The majority of the township is served by Oscoda Area Schools to the north in Oscoda, while the southwest corner of the township is served by Tawas Area Schools in Tawas City.
