= Reno, Michigan =

Reno may refer to the following places in the U.S state of Michigan:

- Reno Township, Michigan, Iosco County
- A former post office and railroad station in Wright Township, Ottawa County, Michigan
