= Van Etten Lake =

Lake in Iosco County, Michigan, United States

- Location within Michigan Location within the United States
- Location: Oscoda Township, Iosco County, Michigan
- Coordinates: 44.4743720°N 83.3636789°W
- Primary inflows: Pine River, Phelan Creek, Dry Creek
- Primary outflows: Pine River
- Surface area: 1,320 acres (530 ha)
- Max. depth: 33 feet (10 m)
- Surface elevation: 587 feet (179 m)
- Islands: (1) Loud Island
- Settlements: Oscoda

Van Etten Lake is a 1,320-acre (530 ha) lake in Iosco County, Michigan. The lake is largely developed with houses surrounded by dense forest. The bottom is mainly clay and it has a maximum depth of 33 feet (10 m). The lake flows through the Pine River into the Au Sable River and then into Lake Huron.

The Van Etten Lake State Forest Campground and Oscoda–Wurtsmith Airport make up large parts of the lakes western shoreline. The area historically had several cabin resort rentals for vacationers as well as fisherman to enjoy. Now the Lake has one remaining resort that is called Sunny Daze Resort ( Formerly Davis Dockside) which is owned by a family that relocated from S.E Michigan

== See also ==
- List of lakes in Michigan
