= Baldwin Township =

Baldwin Township may refer to:

== In Canada ==
- Baldwin Township, Ontario

== In the United States ==
- Baldwin Township, Iosco County, Michigan
- Baldwin Township, Delta County, Michigan
- Baldwin Township, Sherburne County, Minnesota
- Baldwin Township, North Carolina, in Chatham County
- Baldwin Township, Barnes County, North Dakota
- Baldwin Township, Allegheny County, Pennsylvania
