= Oscoda Township, Michigan =

- Charter township
- Charter Township of Oscoda
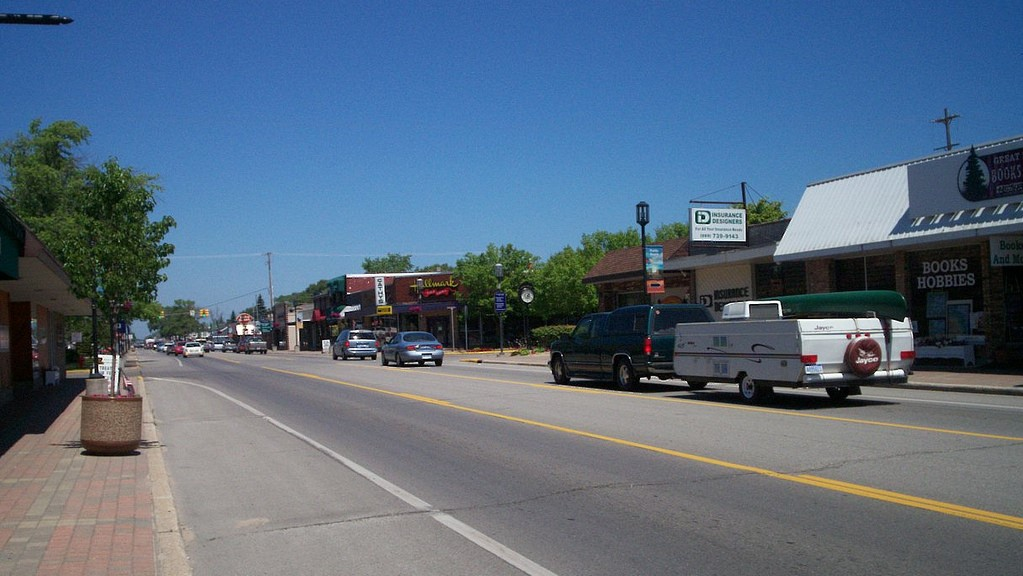
- Community of Oscoda along U.S. Route 23

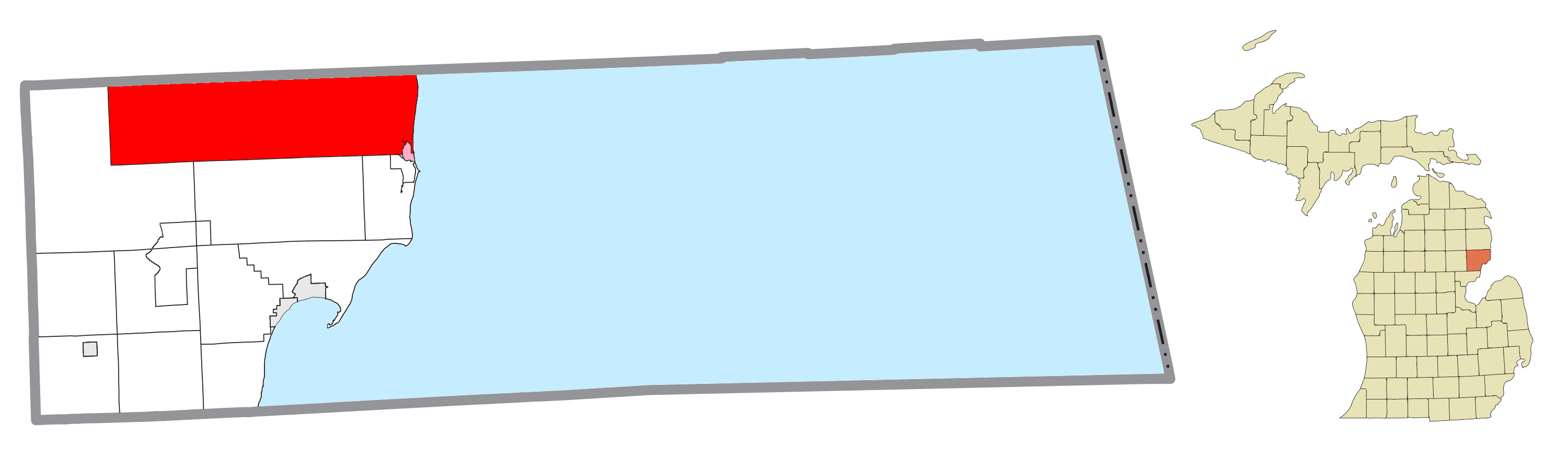
- Location within Iosco County (red) and the administered CDP of Oscoda (pink)

- Location within the state of Michigan Location within the United States
- Coordinates: 44°27′54″N 83°27′26″W
- Country: United States
- State: Michigan
- County: Iosco
- Organized: 1857

Government
  - Supervisor: Nicole Tregear
  - Clerk: Heather Tate

Area
  - Total: 131.28 sq mi (340.01 km^{2})
  - Land: 121.99 sq mi (315.95 km^{2})
  - Water: 9.29 sq mi (24.06 km^{2})
- Elevation: 771 ft (235 m)

Population (2020)
  - Total: 7,152
  - Density: 55.6/sq mi (21.5/km^{2})
- Time zone: UTC-5 (Eastern (EST))
  - Summer (DST): UTC-4 (EDT)
- ZIP code: 48737 (Glennie); 48738 (Greenbush); 48739 (Hale); 48745 (Mikado); 48750 (Oscoda)
- Area code: 989
- FIPS code: 26-61340
- GNIS feature ID: 1626864
- Website: Official website

Oscoda Township is a charter township of Iosco County in the U.S. state of Michigan. The population was 7,152 at the 2020 census. The Wurtsmith Air Force Base is located within the township.

== Communities ==
- Foote Site Village is an unincorporated community located within the township at 44°25′36″N 83°26′41″W. It is near the Foote Dam Pond along the south side of the Au Sable River
- Oscoda is an unincorporated community and census-designated place (CDP) that is mostly located within the township at 44°25′13″N 83°19′51″W. Only a very small portion of the CDP extends into Au Sable Township to the south.

== Geography ==
According to the U.S. Census Bureau, the township has a total area of 131.28 square miles (340.01 km^{2}), of which 121.99 square miles (315.95 km^{2}) is land and 9.29 square miles (24.06 km^{2}) (7.08%) is water.

It is the largest municipality by area in Iosco County. The Au Sable River flows east through most of the township and contains numerous dams and reservoirs. The Loud Dam Pond, Cooke Dam Pond, and Foote Dam Pond are along the river. The Pine River also flows south into the township into Van Etten Lake before joining the Au Sable River slightly before Lake Huron. Portions of the Manistee National Forest are within the township.

== Transportation ==
=== Airport ===
- Oscoda–Wurtsmith Airport is a public use airport that was created in 1993 from part of the disestablished Wurtsmith Air Force Base.

=== Bus ===
- Indian Trails has a station in Oscoda that is along the Owosso–St. Ignace route that follows U.S. Highway 23 at this point.

=== Major highways ===
- US 23 runs south–north along the eastern edge of the township near Lake Huron.
- M-65 runs through the western portion of the township.
- F-41 has its southern terminus at US 23 within the township.

== Demographics ==
As of the census of 2000, there were 7,248 people, 3,170 households, and 2,066 families residing in the township. The population density was 59.5 inhabitants per square mile (23.0/km^{2}). There were 6,071 housing units at an average density of 49.9 per square mile (19.3/km^{2}). The racial makeup of the township was 95.28% White, 0.80% African American, 1.02% Native American, 0.70% Asian, 0.14% Pacific Islander, 0.41% from other races, and 1.64% from two or more races. Hispanic or Latino of any race were 1.30% of the population.

There were 3,170 households, out of which 25.4% had children under the age of 18 living with them, 52.5% were married couples living together, 9.7% had a female householder with no husband present, and 34.8% were non-families. 29.9% of all households were made up of individuals, and 12.6% had someone living alone who was 65 years of age or older. The average household size was 2.28 and the average family size was 2.79.

In the township the population was spread out, with 23.3% under the age of 18, 5.7% from 18 to 24, 24.4% from 25 to 44, 27.7% from 45 to 64, and 18.9% who were 65 years of age or older. The median age was 43 years. For every 100 females, there were 97.7 males. For every 100 females age 18 and over, there were 95.1 males.

The median income for a household in the township was $31,250, and the median income for a family was $38,457. Males had a median income of $30,439 versus $20,601 for females. The per capita income for the township was $16,312. About 9.2% of families and 13.4% of the population were below the poverty line, including 19.8% of those under age 18 and 4.4% of those age 65 or over.

== Education ==
Oscoda Township is served entirely by Oscoda Area Schools, which also serves portions of several surrounding townships. A satellite campus of Alpena Community College is also located within the township.
