= East Tawas, Michigan =

- City
- City of East Tawas
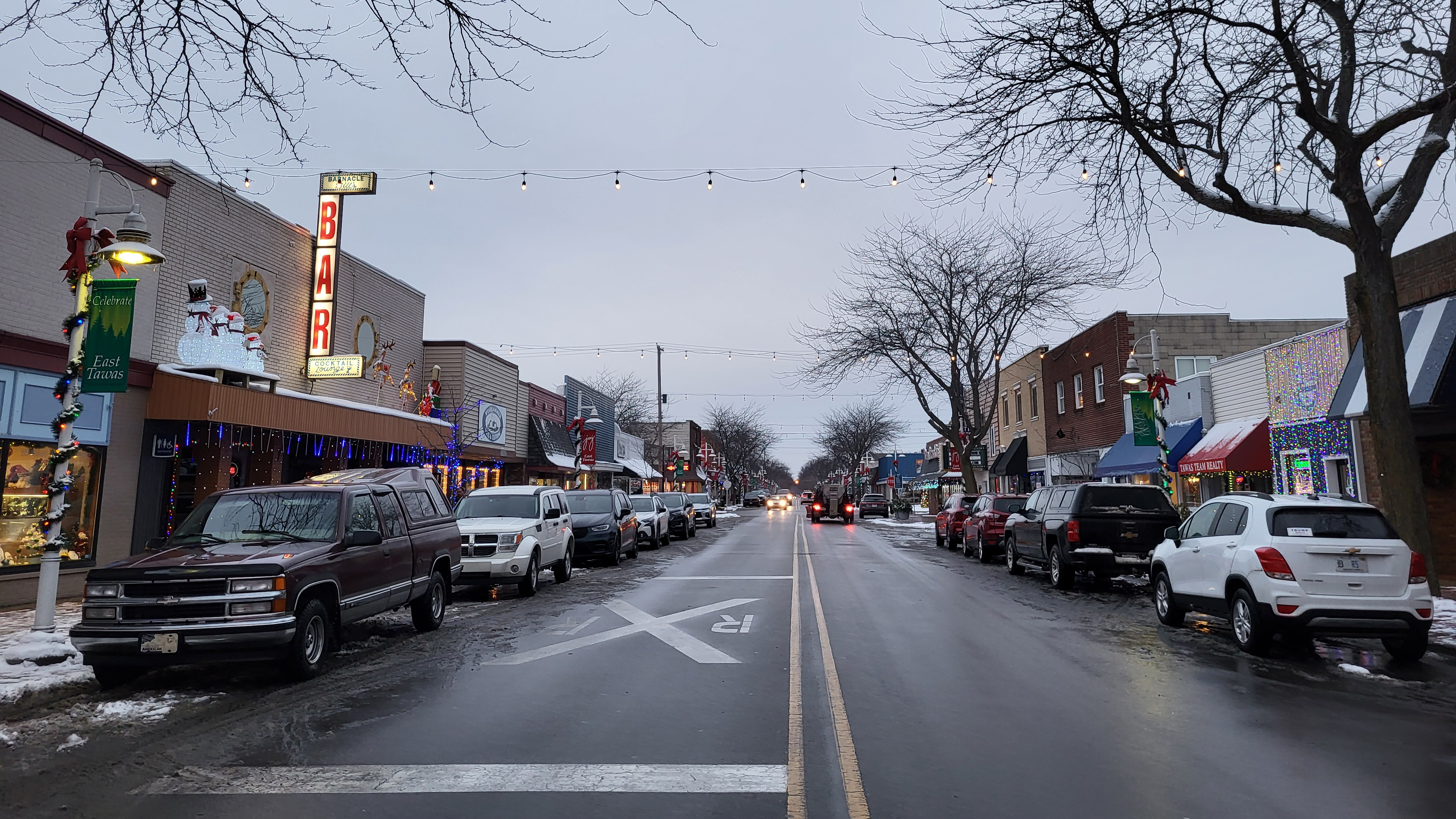
- Downtown East Tawas along Newman Street

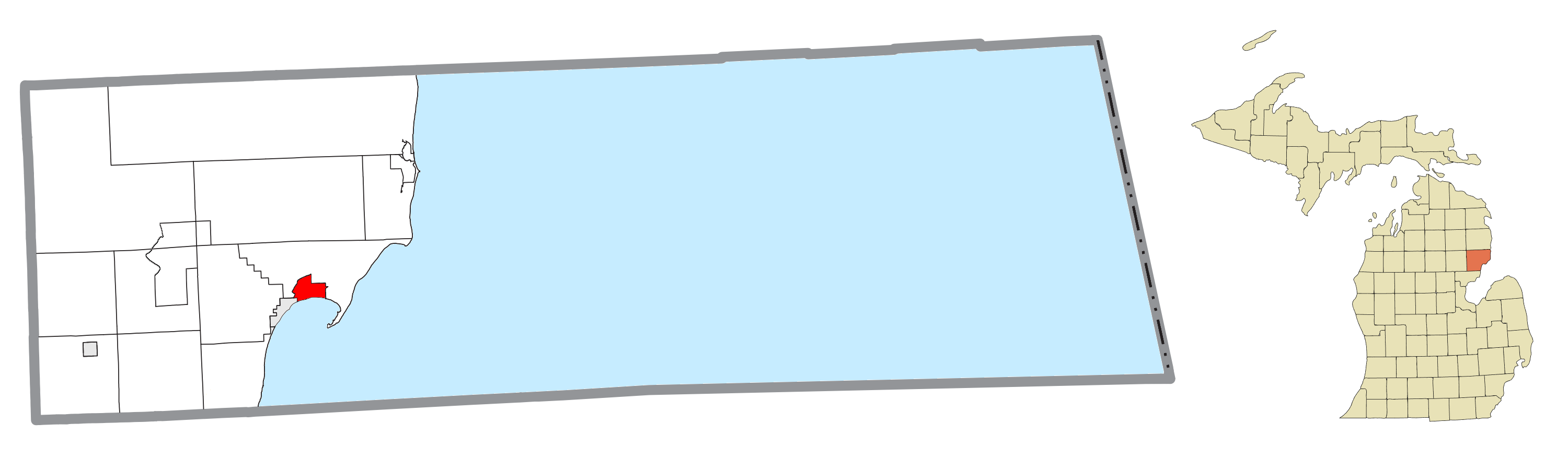
- Location within Iosco County

- Location within the state of Michigan Location within the United States
- Coordinates: 44°17′8″N 83°29′21″W
- Country: United States
- State: Michigan
- County: Iosco
- Settled: 1862
- Incorporated: 1887 (village); 1895 (city)

Government
  - Type: Council–manager
  - Mayor: Bruce Bolen
  - Clerk: Julie Potts
  - Manager: Brent Barringer

Area
  - Total: 3.27 sq mi (8.47 km^{2})
  - Land: 2.81 sq mi (7.28 km^{2})
  - Water: 0.46 sq mi (1.19 km^{2})
- Elevation: 584 ft (178 m)

Population (2020)
  - Total: 2,663
  - Density: 947/sq mi (365.5/km^{2})
- Time zone: UTC-5 (Eastern (EST))
  - Summer (DST): UTC-4 (EDT)
- ZIP code(s): 48730
- Area code: 989
- FIPS code: 26-24420
- GNIS feature ID: 0625264
- Website: Official website

East Tawas is a city in Iosco County in the U.S. state of Michigan. The population was 2,663 at the 2020 census.

== History ==
The western New York firm Smith, Van Valkenburg, & Company bought land in the area in order to exploit the area's lumber resources. George Smith settled in the area in 1862 and founded the community. The East Tawas post office opened on April 15, 1867. A predecessor of the Detroit and Mackinac Railway built a station here, and the community incorporated as a village in 1887 and later as a city in 1895. Tawas Beach was established nearby in 1903 along the railway line in Baldwin Township. A post office opened here on June 12, 1903, until the community was annexed into the city of East Tawas in 1922.

== Geography ==
According to the U.S. Census Bureau, the city has a total area of 3.27 square miles (8.47 km^{2}), of which 2.81 square miles (7.28 km^{2}) is land and 0.46 square miles (1.19 km^{2}) (14.07) is water.

Tawas Point State Park is located near East Tawas in Baldwin Township.

=== Climate ===
Climate data for East Tawas, Michigan (1991–2020 normals, extremes 1890–present)
Month	Jan	Feb	Mar	Apr	May	Jun	Jul	Aug	Sep	Oct	Nov	Dec	Year
Record high °F (°C)	59 (15)	62 (17)	78 (26)	91 (33)	95 (35)	101 (38)	106 (41)	103 (39)	101 (38)	93 (34)	78 (26)	65 (18)	106 (41)
Mean daily maximum °F (°C)	29.7 (−1.3)	32.3 (0.2)	40.8 (4.9)	52.2 (11.2)	64.9 (18.3)	75.2 (24.0)	80.2 (26.8)	78.8 (26.0)	71.7 (22.1)	58.8 (14.9)	45.5 (7.5)	35.0 (1.7)	55.4 (13.0)
Daily mean °F (°C)	21.5 (−5.8)	22.6 (−5.2)	30.9 (−0.6)	42.2 (5.7)	54.4 (12.4)	64.2 (17.9)	69.2 (20.7)	67.8 (19.9)	60.4 (15.8)	48.4 (9.1)	37.3 (2.9)	27.8 (−2.3)	45.6 (7.6)
Mean daily minimum °F (°C)	13.3 (−10.4)	12.9 (−10.6)	21.0 (−6.1)	32.2 (0.1)	43.8 (6.6)	53.3 (11.8)	58.1 (14.5)	56.7 (13.7)	49.1 (9.5)	38.1 (3.4)	29.1 (−1.6)	20.5 (−6.4)	35.7 (2.1)
Record low °F (°C)	−25 (−32)	−29 (−34)	−20 (−29)	−7 (−22)	18 (−8)	28 (−2)	33 (1)	24 (−4)	21 (−6)	12 (−11)	−4 (−20)	−19 (−28)	−29 (−34)
Average precipitation inches (mm)	2.08 (53)	1.82 (46)	1.90 (48)	3.42 (87)	3.24 (82)	3.29 (84)	3.10 (79)	2.95 (75)	2.92 (74)	2.95 (75)	2.53 (64)	2.07 (53)	32.27 (820)
Average snowfall inches (cm)	14.3 (36)	12.4 (31)	7.2 (18)	2.9 (7.4)	0.0 (0.0)	0.0 (0.0)	0.0 (0.0)	0.0 (0.0)	0.0 (0.0)	0.1 (0.25)	2.6 (6.6)	9.7 (25)	49.2 (125)
Average precipitation days (≥ 0.01 in)	12.1	9.1	8.8	10.1	11.6	10.5	9.8	9.0	9.6	11.6	10.6	10.6	123.4
Average snowy days (≥ 0.1 in)	9.0	7.6	4.3	1.3	0.0	0.0	0.0	0.0	0.0	0.0	1.8	6.8	30.8
Source: NOAA

=== Major highways ===
- US 23 runs through the city.

== Demographics ==
Historical population
Census	Pop.	Note	%±
1880	1,086		—
1890	2,200		102.6%
1900	1,736		−21.1%
1910	1,452		−16.4%
1920	1,398		−3.7%
1930	1,455		4.1%
1940	1,670		14.8%
1950	2,040		22.2%
1960	2,462		20.7%
1970	2,372		−3.7%
1980	2,584		8.9%
1990	2,887		11.7%
2000	2,951		2.2%
2010	2,808		−4.8%
2020	2,663		−5.2%
U.S. Decennial Census

=== 2020 census ===
As of the 2020 census, East Tawas had a population of 2,663. The median age was 55.6 years. 16.5% of residents were under the age of 18 and 32.1% of residents were 65 years of age or older. For every 100 females there were 82.4 males, and for every 100 females age 18 and over there were 79.6 males age 18 and over.

98.3% of residents lived in urban areas, while 1.7% lived in rural areas.

There were 1,274 households in East Tawas, of which 18.4% had children under the age of 18 living in them. Of all households, 40.0% were married-couple households, 18.9% were households with a male householder and no spouse or partner present, and 35.0% were households with a female householder and no spouse or partner present. About 40.4% of all households were made up of individuals and 21.5% had someone living alone who was 65 years of age or older.

There were 1,652 housing units, of which 22.9% were vacant. The homeowner vacancy rate was 2.7% and the rental vacancy rate was 7.8%.

Racial composition as of the 2020 census
Race	Number	Percent
White	2,478	93.1%
Black or African American	7	0.3%
American Indian and Alaska Native	11	0.4%
Asian	41	1.5%
Native Hawaiian and Other Pacific Islander	0	0.0%
Some other race	24	0.9%
Two or more races	102	3.8%
Hispanic or Latino (of any race)	83	3.1%

=== 2010 census ===
As of the census of 2010, there were 2,808 people, 1,332 households, and 756 families residing in the city. The population density was 988.7 inhabitants per square mile (381.7/km^{2}). There were 1,728 housing units at an average density of 608.5 per square mile (234.9/km^{2}). The racial makeup of the city was 95.7% White, 0.2% African American, 0.3% Native American, 1.1% Asian, 0.1% Pacific Islander, 0.7% from other races, and 1.9% from two or more races. Hispanic or Latino residents of any race were 2.0% of the population.

There were 1,332 households, of which 21.4% had children under the age of 18 living with them, 42.6% were married couples living together, 10.1% had a female householder with no husband present, 4.1% had a male householder with no wife present, and 43.2% were non-families. 38.9% of all households were made up of individuals, and 20.4% had someone living alone who was 65 years of age or older. The average household size was 2.06 and the average family size was 2.70.

The median age in the city was 50.9 years. 18.6% of residents were under the age of 18; 5% were between the ages of 18 and 24; 17.7% were from 25 to 44; 31.2% were from 45 to 64; and 27.5% were 65 years of age or older. The gender makeup of the city was 45.2% male and 54.8% female.

=== 2000 census ===
As of the census of 2000, there were 2,951 people, 1,382 households, and 815 families residing in the city. The population density was 1,026.0 inhabitants per square mile (396.1/km^{2}). There were 1,691 housing units at an average density of 587.9 per square mile (227.0/km^{2}). The racial makeup of the city was 97.80% White, 0.03% African American, 0.44% Native American, 0.44% Asian, 0.07% Pacific Islander, 0.10% from other races, and 1.12% from two or more races. Hispanic or Latino residents of any race were 0.75% of the population.

There were 1,382 households, out of which 23.7% had children under the age of 18 living with them, 47.1% were married couples living together, 9.1% had a female householder with no husband present, and 41.0% were non-families. 37.7% of all households were made up of individuals, and 23.0% had someone living alone who was 65 years of age or older. The average household size was 2.14 and the average family size was 2.79.

In the city, 22.3% of the population was under the age of 18, 5.3% was from 18 to 24, 23.3% from 25 to 44, 22.6% from 45 to 64, and 26.5% was 65 years of age or older. The median age was 44 years. For every 100 females, there were 82.8 males. For every 100 females age 18 and over, there were 77.3 males.

The median income for a household in the city was $30,229, and the median income for a family was $40,313. Males had a median income of $30,375 versus $22,538 for females. The per capita income for the city was $17,168. About 6.9% of families and 10.2% of the population were below the poverty line, including 13.2% of those under age 18 and 11.1% of those age 65 or over.

== Education ==
The city is served by Tawas Area Schools.

Holy Family School is a private parochial elementary school in East Tawas serving approximately 80 students in grades K-6. It is affiliated with the Diocese of Gaylord of the Roman Catholic Church, and is a member of the National Catholic Educational Association.
