= Au Sable, Michigan =

- Census-designated place (CDP) & unincorporated community
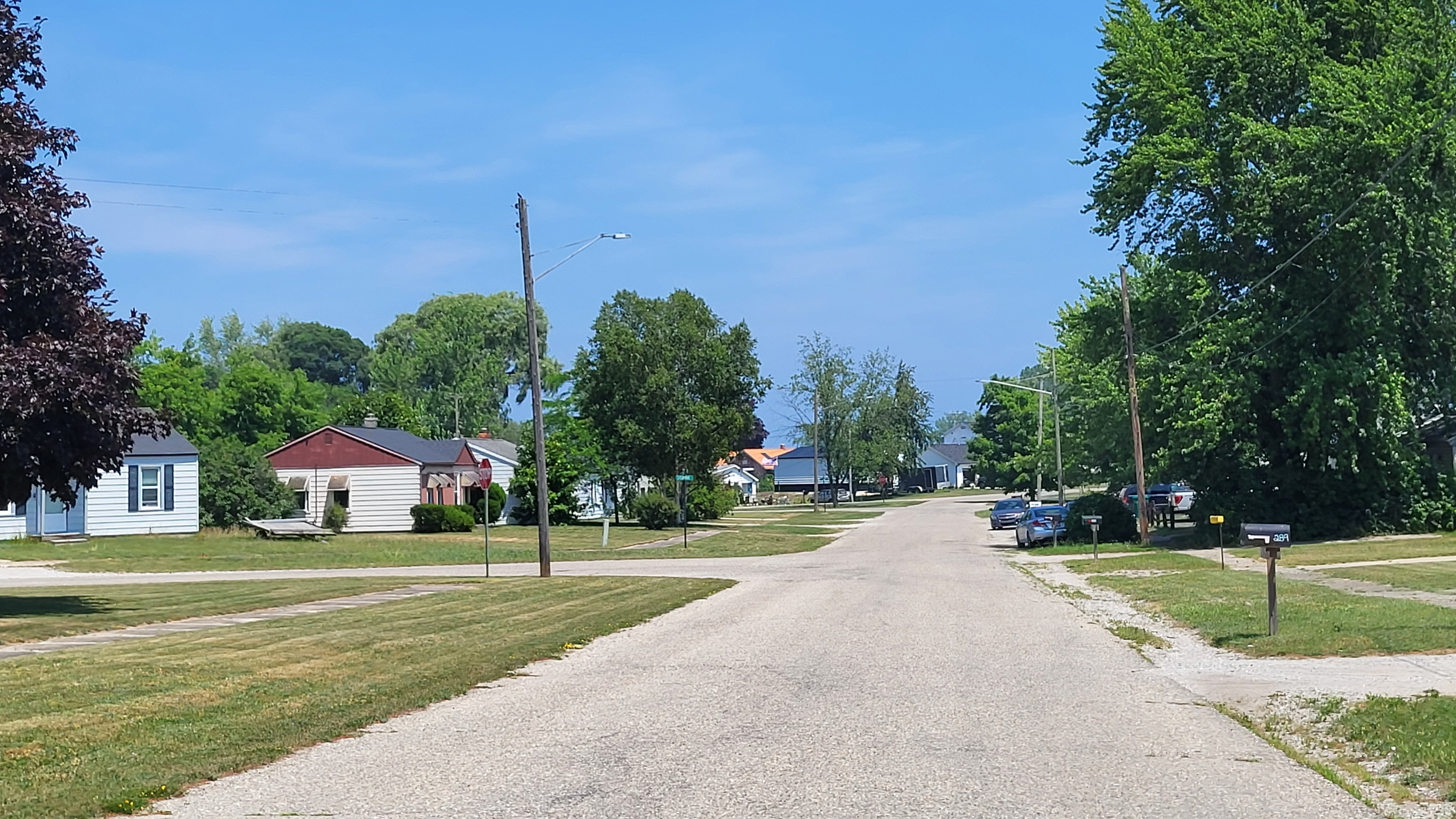
- Looking northeast along State Street

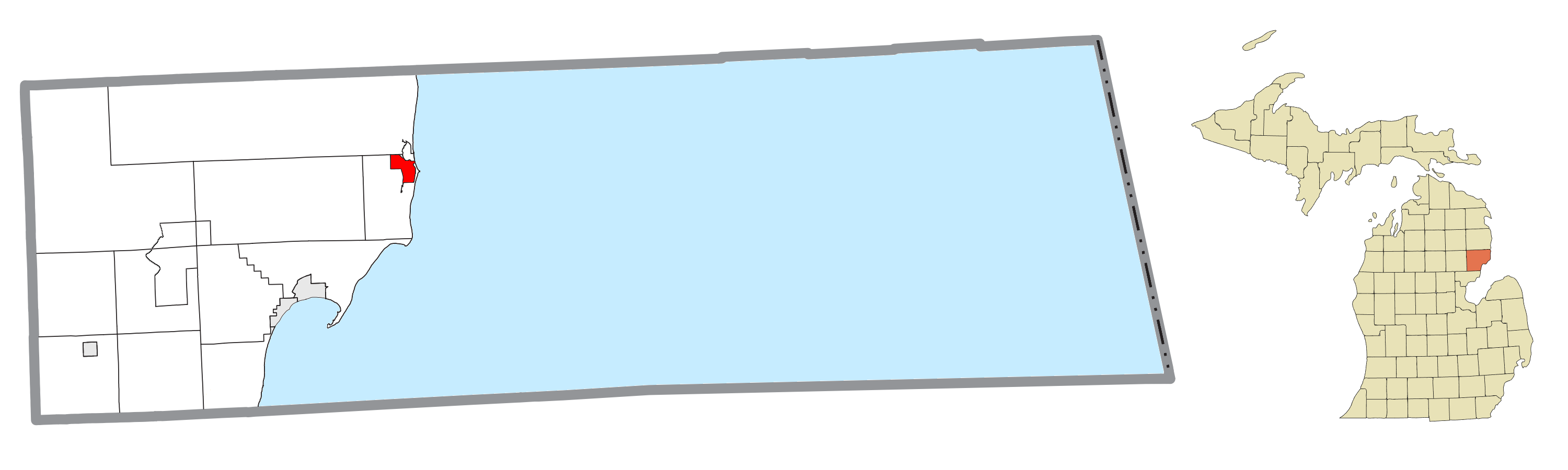
- Location within Iosco County

- Location within the state of Michigan Location within the United States
- Coordinates: 44°24′39″N 83°19′56″W
- Country: United States
- State: Michigan
- County: Iosco
- Township: Au Sable
- Platted: 1849
- Incorporated: 1872 (village); 1889 (city)
- Disincorporated: 1931

Area
  - Total: 2.13 sq mi (5.52 km^{2})
  - Land: 2.10 sq mi (5.44 km^{2})
  - Water: 0.031 sq mi (0.08 km^{2})
- Elevation: 592 ft (180 m)

Population (2020)
  - Total: 1,453
  - Density: 693/sq mi (267.5/km^{2})
- Time zone: UTC-5 (Eastern (EST))
  - Summer (DST): UTC-4 (EDT)
- ZIP code(s): 48750 (Oscoda)
- Area code: 989
- FIPS code: 26-04280
- GNIS feature ID: 620323

Au Sable (/ɔː ˈsɑːbəl/ aw SAH-bəl) is an unincorporated community and census-designated place (CDP) in Iosco County, Michigan. The population of the CDP was 1,453 at the 2020 census. The community is located within Au Sable Township at the mouth of the Au Sable River along Lake Huron.

== History ==
Au Sable was first settled in 1848 when Curtis Emerson and James Eldridge purchased land in the area. The community was platted the next year. A post office in Au Sable began operating on September 23, 1856 and was named for its location along the Au Sable River. The community was replatted in 1867 and incorporated as a village in 1872. Au Sable was the largest community in the county and incorporated as a city in 1889.

At the 1890 census, the new city recorded a population of 4,328. Most of the city was destroyed by forest fires in 1911, and the post office closed on December 15, 1912. The city last recorded only 61 residents at the 1930 census. The city surrendered its charter in 1931 and dissolved into an unincorporated community within Au Sable Township.

== Geography ==
According to the U.S. Census Bureau, the CDP has a total area of 2.13 square miles (5.52 km^{2}), of which 2.10 square miles (5.44 km^{2}) is land and 0.03 square miles (0.08 km^{2}) (1.41%) is water.

The community is located on the south side of the Au Sable River at its river mouth at Lake Huron. The community of Oscoda is on the north side of the river. Au Sable is served by Oscoda Area Schools.

=== Major highways ===
- US 23 runs south–north along the eastern edge of the community near Lake Huron.

== Demographics ==
Historical population
Census	Pop.	Note	%±
1890	4,328		—
1900	1,116		−74.2%
1910	648		−41.9%
1920	171		−73.6%
1930	61		−64.3%
1990	1,542		—
2000	1,533		−0.6%
2010	1,404		−8.4%
2020	1,453		3.5%
U.S. Decennial Census

As of the census of 2000, there were 1,533 people, 626 households, and 430 families residing in the CDP. The population density was 727.4 inhabitants per square mile (280.9/km^{2}). There were 727 housing units at an average density of 345.0 per square mile (133.2/km^{2}). The racial makeup of the CDP was 96.41% White, 1.11% Black or African American, 0.33% Native American, 0.39% Asian, 0.07% from other races, and 1.70% from two or more races. Hispanic or Latino of any race were 0.65% of the population.

There were 626 households, out of which 31.8% had children under the age of 18 living with them, 55.1% were married couples living together, 9.9% had a female householder with no husband present, and 31.2% were non-families. 26.4% of all households were made up of individuals, and 14.1% had someone living alone who was 65 years of age or older. The average household size was 2.43 and the average family size was 2.91.

In the CDP, the population was spread out, with 26.0% under the age of 18, 5.2% from 18 to 24, 26.7% from 25 to 44, 23.5% from 45 to 64, and 18.7% who were 65 years of age or older. The median age was 41 years. For every 100 females, there were 98.3 males. For every 100 females age 18 and over, there were 96.4 males.

The median income for a household in the CDP was $36,989, and the median income for a family was $41,667. Males had a median income of $27,500 versus $18,989 for females. The per capita income for the CDP was $21,035. About 5.0% of families and 8.0% of the population were below the poverty line, including 12.7% of those under age 18 and 4.8% of those age 65 or over.

== Notable people ==
- Jack Fournier, professional baseball player, scout, and collegiate coach, born in Au Sable.
