= Oscoda Area Schools =

School district in Michigan

Address
- 3550 E River Road Oscoda, Iosco County, Michigan, 48750; United States

District information
- Grades: Pre-Kindergarten-12
- Superintendent: Scott Moore
- Schools: 2
- Budget: $18,154,000 2022-2023 expenditures
- NCES District ID: 2626970

Students and staff
- Students: 1,199 (2024-2025)
- Teachers: 71.29 (on an FTE basis) (2024-2025)
- Staff: 172.69 FTE (2024-2025)
- Student–teacher ratio: 16.82 (2024-2025)
- Athletic conference: North Star League
- District mascot: Owls
- Colors: Royal Blue & White

Other information
- Website: www.oscodaschools.org

Oscoda Public Schools is a public school district in Northern Michigan. In Iosco County, it serves Au Sable, Oscoda, Oscoda Township, and parts of the townships of Au Sable and Wilber. In Alcona County, it serves the townships of Curtis, Greenbush, and part of Mikado Township.

== History ==
The former Oscoda High School opened in 1920 and received additions in 1938 and 1943.

Francis Whittemore Elementary on Cedar Lake Road opened around 1952 and received an addition in 1954.

The current Oscoda High School opened in fall 1961 and was built to accommodate 1,800 students. It was funded in part by the Federal Government because of the recent expansion of Wurtsmith Air Force Base. The community also voted for bond issues to fund extra features in the building such as the 658-seat auditorium and swimming pool. The building received nationwide attention in the educational community for its innovative design. Eberle M. Smith Associates of Detroit was the architect.

The elementary school in Glennie, once part of a separate district, became part of Oscoda Area Schools in 1964.

As of 2002, the district operated Richardson Elementary/Middle School, Cedar Lake Elementary, Glennie Elementary, and County Line School. Glennie Elementary closed in 2009, and Cedar Lake Elementary closed at the end of the 2011-2012 school year.

== Schools ==
As of 2026, there are two schools in the district. The high school and elementary school share a campus at 3550 E River Road west of Oscoda.

Schools in Oscoda Area Schools district
School	Notes
Oscoda Area High School	Grades 7-12. Built 1961.
Richardson Elementary	Grades PreK-6
