= Iosco County, Michigan =

County in Michigan, United States

- County
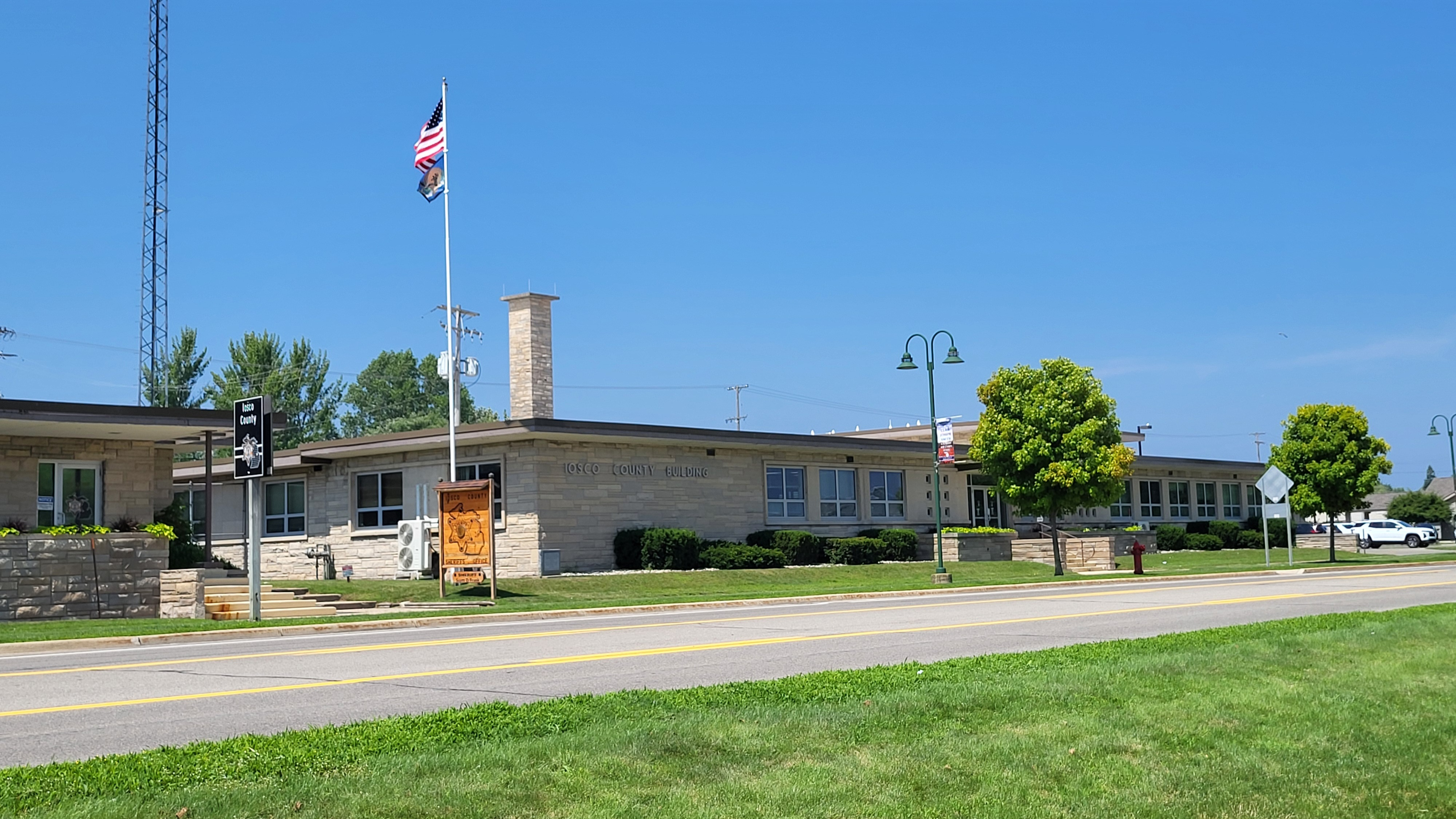
- Iosco County Building in Tawas City

- Seal

- Location within the U.S. state of Michigan
- Coordinates: 44°17′N 83°20′W
- Country: United States
- State: Michigan
- Founded: 1840 as "Kanotin"
- Organized: 1857
- Seat: Tawas City
- Largest city: East Tawas

Area
  - Total: 1,890 sq mi (4,900 km^{2})
  - Land: 549 sq mi (1,420 km^{2})
  - Water: 1,341 sq mi (3,470 km^{2}) 71%

Population (2020)
  - Total: 25,237
  - Estimate (2025): 25,266 ▲
  - Density: 46.0/sq mi (17.7/km^{2})
- Time zone: UTC−5 (Eastern)
  - Summer (DST): UTC−4 (EDT)
- Congressional district: 1st
- Website: iosco.net

Iosco County (/aɪˈɒskoʊ/ eye-OSS-koh) is a county in the U.S. state of Michigan; its eastern border is formed by Lake Huron. As of the 2020 census, its population was 25,237. Its county seat is Tawas City.

== Etymology ==
Iosco has traditionally been said to be a Native American word meaning "water of light", but was actually coined as a pseudo-Native American name by Henry Rowe Schoolcraft, an American geographer and ethnologist who served as the U.S. Indian agent in Michigan in the late 19th century. He named several counties and towns during the state's formative years.

== History ==
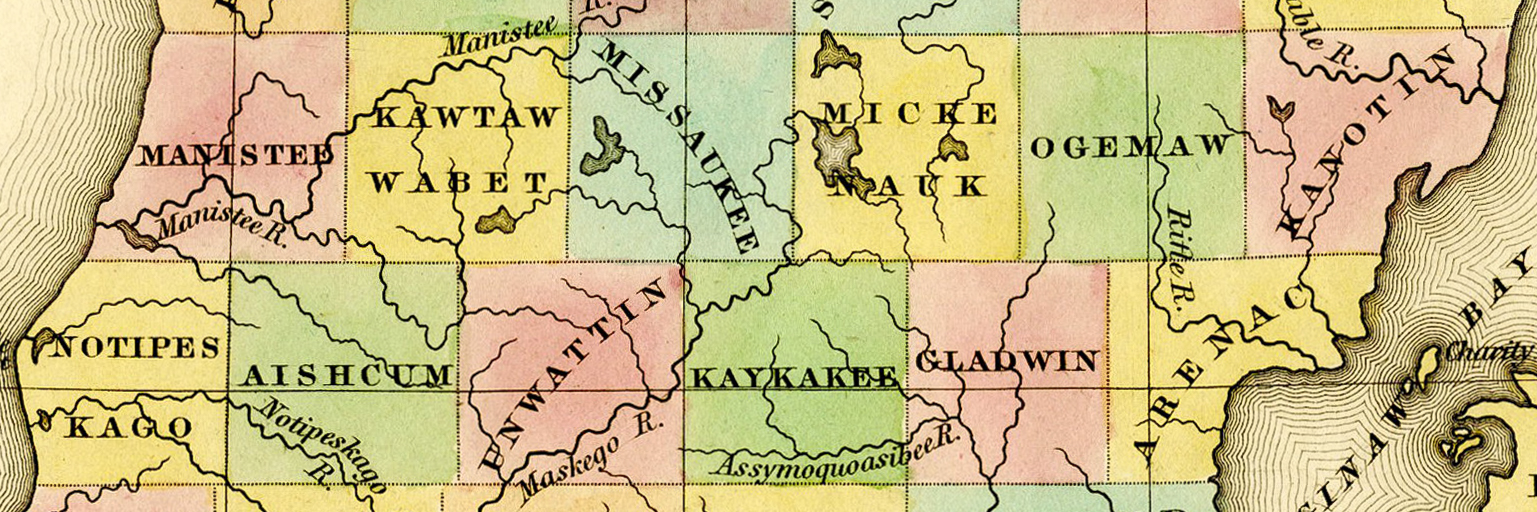
A detail from A New Map of Michigan with its Canals, Roads & Distances (1842) by Henry Schenck Tanner, showing Iosco County as Kanotin, the county's name from 1840 to 1843. Several nearby counties are also shown with names that would later be changed.

The county was created by the Michigan Legislature in 1840 as Kanotin County, and renamed Iosco County in 1843. It was administered by a succession of other Michigan counties before the organization of county government in 1857. A majority of the population was Ojibwe. The area offered shelter from tall white pines and food from the river and lake. Iosco County was cut from a piece of land ceded by the Ojibwe to the U.S. government. When the lumber boom hit, many more people moved to the area.

The 400-acre Alabaster Historic District, listed on the National Register of Historic Places, is associated with an operating gypsum open-pit mine south of Tawas City. The large company town included internal rail lines for transportation and a tramway extending over Lake Huron on long piers for loading gypsum onto ships. Started in 1862, the mine supplied gypsum for temporary buildings constructed in Chicago at the World Columbian Exposition of 1893. Two companies continue to mine gypsum in Iosco County.

In 2009, Alabaster Township formed the nonprofit Alabaster Wind Power Development Corp. to conduct the necessary two-year studies of wind data at this site as a potential location for development of wind turbines. It proposed using 10 large tramway platforms that extend more than 6,000 feet into the lake to gauge winds. The turbines could be built on the tramways. At the time, the federal government was offering subsidies for such studies and development of alternative energy projects.

== Geography ==
According to the US Census Bureau, the county has an area of 1,890 square miles (4,900 km^{2}), of which 549 square miles (1,420 km^{2}) is land and 1,341 square miles (3,470 km^{2}) (71%) is water. It is considered part of Northern Michigan. In total, it covers about 6,361,837 acres.

=== Geographic features ===
- Lumberman's Monument
- Canoer's memorial
- 60 Lakes Area - Located near Hale
- Iargo Springs
- Tawas Point Light House - First lit in 1853
- Tawas Bay
- Pine River – rises in Alcona County and flows into Iosco County, where it empties into Van Etten Lake at 44°29′38″N 83°23′16″W northwest of Oscoda.
- Au Sable River
- Tuttle Marsh Wildlife Area
- Van Etten Lake
- Tawas Lake
- Foote Dam Pond
- Au Sable State Forest (partial) – the Grayling Fire Management Unit consists of Alcona, Crawford, and Oscoda Counties, and northern Iosco county.

=== Major highways ===
- US 23 – known as the Sunrise Side Coastal Highway.
- M-55 – one of three cross-peninsular state highways. It begins in Tawas City at the junction with US 23.
- M-65
- F-41
- River Road National Scenic Byway – starts at M-65 and runs parallel with the Au Sable River for 23 miles (37 km) eastward to US 23 in Oscoda, Michigan. It is a designated National Scenic Byway. It passes the Lumberman's Monument.

=== Adjacent counties ===
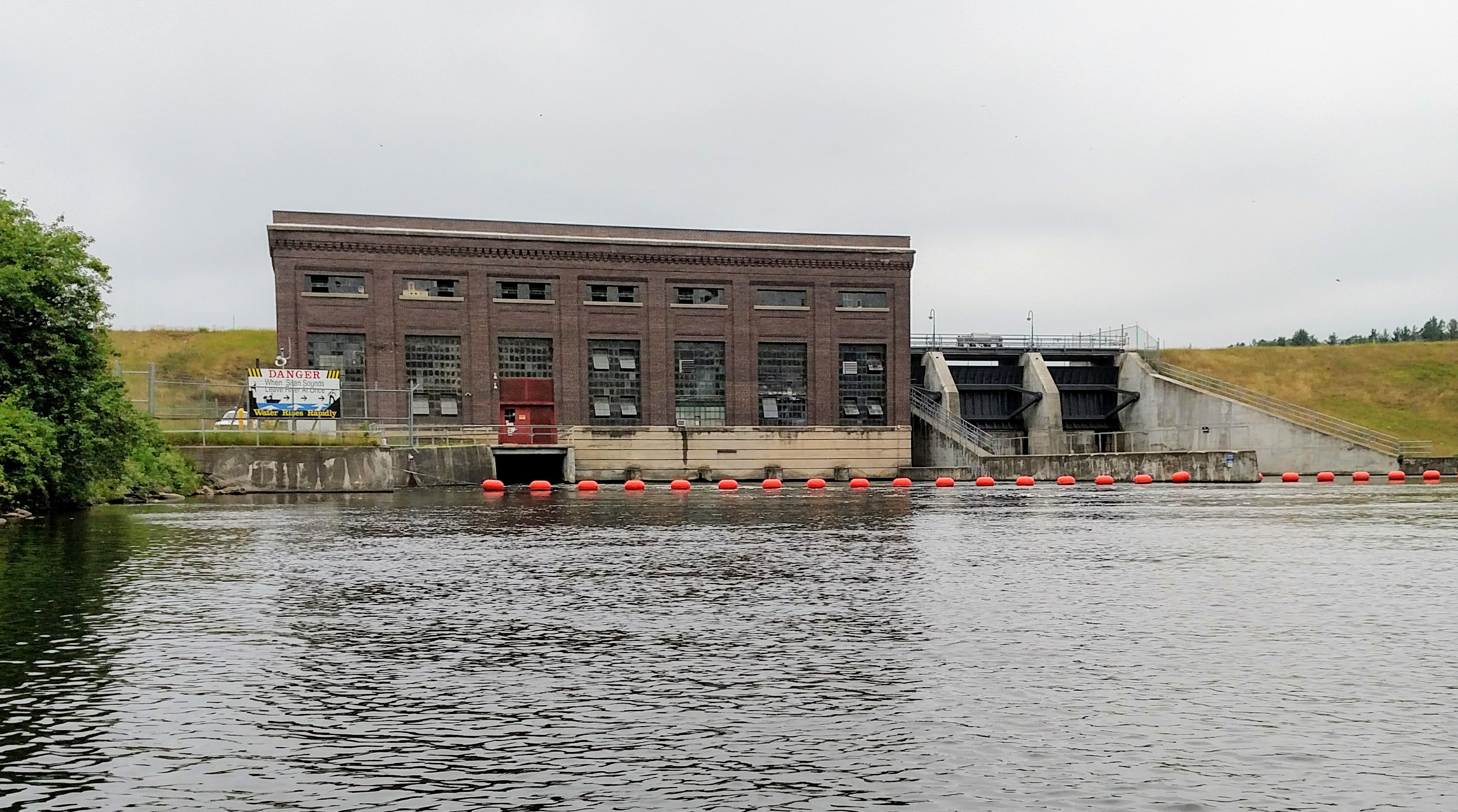
Loud Dam on the Au Sable River in Au Sable Township

By land

- Alcona County - north
- Arenac County - southwest
- Ogemaw County - west
- Oscoda County - northwest

By water

- Huron County - southeast

=== National protected area ===
- Huron National Forest (part)

== Communities ==
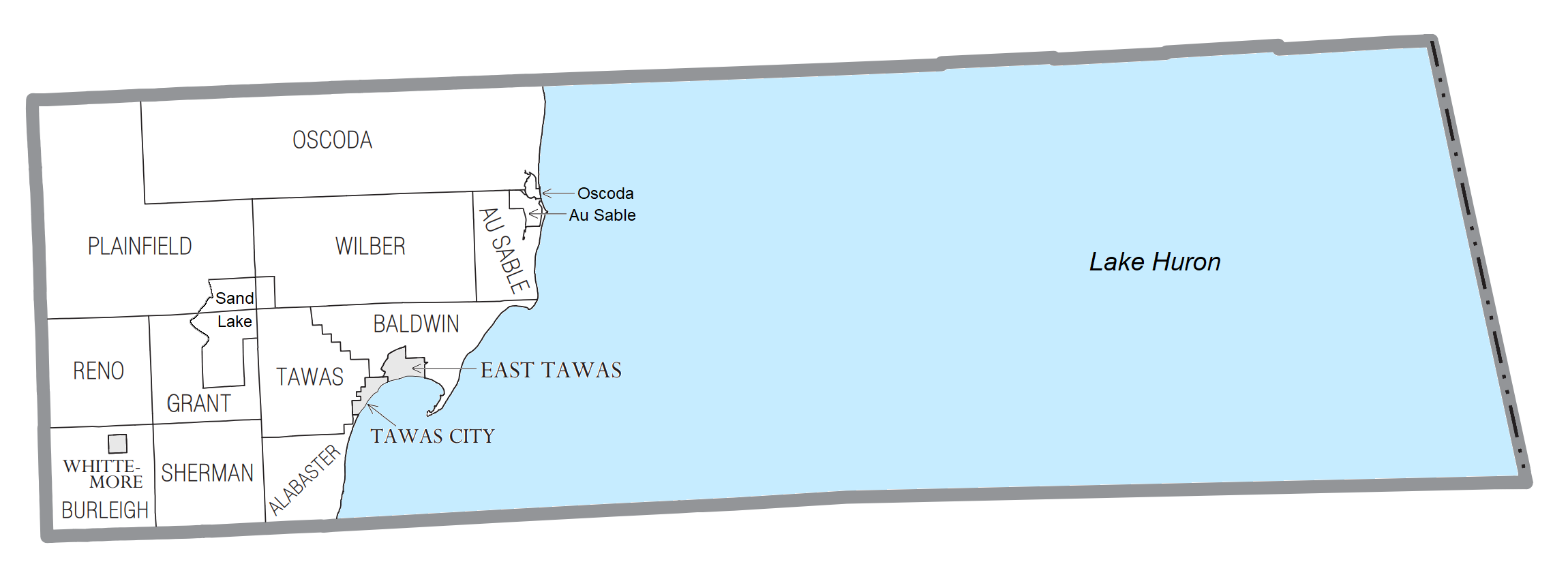
U.S. census data map showing local municipal boundaries within Iosco County, as well as CDP boundaries. Shaded areas represent incorporated cities.

=== Cities ===
- East Tawas
- Tawas City (county seat)
- Whittemore

=== Charter townships ===
- Au Sable Charter Township
- Oscoda Charter Township

=== Civil townships ===
- Alabaster Township
- Baldwin Township
- Burleigh Township
- Grant Township
- Plainfield Township
- Reno Township
- Sherman Township
- Tawas Township
- Wilber Township

=== Census-designated places ===
- Au Sable
- Oscoda
- Sand Lake

=== Other unincorporated communities ===
- Alabaster
- Foote Site Village
- Hale
- Long Lake
- National City
- South Branch

== Demographics ==
Historical population
Census	Pop.	Note	%±
1860	175		—
1870	3,163		1,707.4%
1880	6,873		117.3%
1890	15,224		121.5%
1900	10,246		−32.7%
1910	9,753		−4.8%
1920	8,199		−15.9%
1930	7,517		−8.3%
1940	8,560		13.9%
1950	10,906		27.4%
1960	16,505		51.3%
1970	24,905		50.9%
1980	28,349		13.8%
1990	30,209		6.6%
2000	27,339		−9.5%
2010	25,887		−5.3%
2020	25,237		−2.5%
2025 (est.)	25,266	▲	0.1%
US Decennial Census; 1790-1960 1900-1990; 1990-2000 2010-2018

Most of the population is located on the shoreline along US-23, East Tawas, Tawas City, and Oscoda.

=== Racial and ethnic composition ===
Iosco County, Michigan – Racial and ethnic composition Note: the US Census treats Hispanic/Latino as an ethnic category. This table excludes Latinos from the racial categories and assigns them to a separate category. Hispanics/Latinos may be of any race.
Race / Ethnicity (NH = Non-Hispanic)	Pop 1980	Pop 1990	Pop 2000	Pop 2010	Pop 2020	% 1980	% 1990	% 2000	% 2010	% 2020
White alone (NH)	27,065	28,739	26,327	24,710	23,244	95.47%	95.13%	96.30%	95.45%	92.10%
Black or African American alone (NH)	649	622	106	121	164	2.29%	2.06%	0.39%	0.47%	0.65%
Native American or Alaska Native alone (NH)	158	224	171	161	124	0.56%	0.74%	0.63%	0.62%	0.49%
Asian alone (NH)	140	258	123	125	153	0.49%	0.85%	0.45%	0.48%	0.61%
Native Hawaiian or Pacific Islander alone (NH)	x	x	14	12	3	x	x	0.05%	0.05%	0.01%
Other race alone (NH)	78	9	8	11	56	0.28%	0.03%	0.03%	0.04%	0.22%
Mixed race or Multiracial (NH)	x	x	321	344	883	x	x	1.17%	1.33%	3.50%
Hispanic or Latino (any race)	259	357	269	403	610	0.91%	1.18%	0.98%	1.56%	2.42%
Total	28,349	30,209	27,339	25,887	25,237	100.00%	100.00%	100.00%	100.00%	100.00%

=== 2020 census ===
As of the 2020 census, the county had a population of 25,237. The median age was 53.4 years. 17.2% of residents were under the age of 18 and 29.9% of residents were 65 years of age or older. For every 100 females there were 99.3 males, and for every 100 females age 18 and over there were 98.5 males age 18 and over.

The racial makeup of the county was 93.0% White, 0.7% Black or African American, 0.5% American Indian and Alaska Native, 0.7% Asian, <0.1% Native Hawaiian and Pacific Islander, 0.8% from some other race, and 4.3% from two or more races. Hispanic or Latino residents of any race comprised 2.4% of the population.

50.2% of residents lived in urban areas, while 49.8% lived in rural areas.

There were 11,662 households in the county, of which 19.9% had children under the age of 18 living in them. Of all households, 44.8% were married-couple households, 22.3% were households with a male householder and no spouse or partner present, and 25.2% were households with a female householder and no spouse or partner present. About 34.3% of all households were made up of individuals and 17.9% had someone living alone who was 65 years of age or older.

There were 19,856 housing units, of which 41.3% were vacant. Among occupied housing units, 79.8% were owner-occupied and 20.2% were renter-occupied. The homeowner vacancy rate was 2.5% and the rental vacancy rate was 8.8%.

=== 2000 census ===
As of the 2000 United States census, there were 27,339 people, 11,727 households, and 7,857 families in the county. The population density was 50 people per square mile (19 people/km^{2}). There were 20,432 housing units at an average density of 37 per square mile (14/km^{2}).

In 2000, the county's racial makeup was 96.92% White, 0.41% Black or African American, 0.66% Native American, 0.46% Asian, 0.05% Pacific Islander, 0.23% from other races, and 1.27% from two or more races. 0.98% of the population were Hispanic or Latino of any race. 23.2% were of German, 12.3% English, 10.6% Irish, 9.9% American, 8.3% Polish and 7.1% French ancestry. 97.4% spoke only English at home, while 1.0% spoke Spanish as a home language.

There were 11,727 households, out of which 24.90% had children under the age of 18 living with them, 55.20% were married couples living together, 8.40% had a female householder with no husband present, and 33.00% were non-families. 28.60% of all households were made up of individuals, and 14.00% had someone living alone who was 65 years of age or older. The average household size was 2.30 and the average family size was 2.79.

The county population included 22.40% under the age of 18, 5.40% from 18 to 24, 23.40% from 25 to 44, 27.30% from 45 to 64, and 21.60% who were 65 years of age or older. The median age was 44 years. For every 100 females there were 96.30 males. For every 100 females age 18 and over, there were 93.60 males.

In 2000, the median income for a household in the county was $31,321, and the median income for a family was $37,452. Males had a median income of $30,338 versus $21,149 for females. The per capita income for the county was $17,115. About 9.50% of families and 12.70% of the population were below the poverty line, including 18.50% of those under age 18 and 7.60% of those age 65 or over.

== Government ==
The county government operates the jail, maintains rural roads, operates the major local courts, records deeds, mortgages, and vital records, administers public health regulations, and participates with the state in the provision of social services. The county board of commissioners controls the budget, with limited authority to make laws or ordinances. In Michigan, most local government functions—police and fire, building and zoning tax assessment, street maintenance, etc.—are the responsibility of individual cities and townships.

=== Elected officials ===
Iosco County has been reliably Republican from the beginning. Since 1884, the Republican presidential nominee has carried the county in 29 of 36 elections.

United States presidential election results for Iosco County, Michigan
Year	Republican		Democratic		Third party(ies)	
Year	No.	%	No.	%	No.	%
1884	1,016	52.83%	864	44.93%	43	2.24%
1888	1,505	45.45%	1,639	49.50%	167	5.04%
1892	1,393	49.57%	1,336	47.54%	81	2.88%
1896	1,470	60.25%	912	37.38%	58	2.38%
1900	1,402	66.41%	679	32.16%	30	1.42%
1904	1,482	75.30%	426	21.65%	60	3.05%
1908	1,224	63.03%	668	34.40%	50	2.57%
1912	521	28.90%	418	23.18%	864	47.92%
1916	984	56.00%	729	41.49%	44	2.50%
1920	2,013	76.71%	548	20.88%	63	2.40%
1924	1,713	71.43%	304	12.68%	381	15.89%
1928	1,873	76.79%	552	22.63%	14	0.57%
1932	1,581	49.62%	1,500	47.08%	105	3.30%
1936	1,768	50.88%	1,547	44.52%	160	4.60%
1940	2,504	65.46%	1,303	34.07%	18	0.47%
1944	2,340	67.26%	1,127	32.39%	12	0.34%
1948	2,599	68.90%	1,115	29.56%	58	1.54%
1952	3,772	74.56%	1,274	25.18%	13	0.26%
1956	4,385	72.50%	1,660	27.45%	3	0.05%
1960	4,308	62.74%	2,549	37.12%	9	0.13%
1964	2,704	38.39%	4,336	61.56%	4	0.06%
1968	4,068	55.42%	2,533	34.51%	739	10.07%
1972	5,750	64.10%	3,065	34.17%	156	1.74%
1976	5,500	52.39%	4,875	46.44%	123	1.17%
1980	6,680	56.54%	4,255	36.01%	880	7.45%
1984	7,907	66.99%	3,850	32.62%	47	0.40%
1988	7,234	59.17%	4,929	40.32%	62	0.51%
1992	4,912	36.41%	5,369	39.79%	3,211	23.80%
1996	4,410	35.50%	6,240	50.23%	1,774	14.28%
2000	6,345	47.99%	6,505	49.20%	372	2.81%
2004	7,301	52.13%	6,557	46.82%	148	1.06%
2008	6,583	46.28%	7,309	51.38%	333	2.34%
2012	6,909	51.62%	6,242	46.63%	234	1.75%
2016	8,345	62.14%	4,345	32.36%	739	5.50%
2020	9,759	63.42%	5,373	34.92%	255	1.66%
2024	10,155	64.55%	5,344	33.97%	232	1.47%

United States Senate election results for Iosco County, Michigan1
Year	Republican		Democratic		Third party(ies)	
Year	No.	%	No.	%	No.	%
2024	9,546	61.89%	5,402	35.03%	475	3.08%

Michigan Gubernatorial election results for Iosco County
Year	Republican		Democratic		Third party(ies)	
Year	No.	%	No.	%	No.	%
2022	15,786	68.19%	7,111	30.72%	254	1.10%

=== County elected officials ===
- Prosecuting Attorney: James Bacarella
- Sheriff: Scott D. Frank
- County Clerk: Nancy J. Huebel
- County Treasurer: Cathy Anderson
- Register of Deeds: Ericka Earl
- Drain Commissioner: Fred Strauer

County commissioners

- District 1: Robert Huebel III
- District 2: Terry Dutcher
- District 3: Charles Finley
- District 4: John Moehring
- District 5: Donald "Jay" O'Farrell

== Education ==
Iosco County has four public school districts:

- Hale Area Schools
- Oscoda Area Schools
- Tawas Area Schools
- Whittemore-Prescott Area Schools

There are also three private elementary schools:

- Emanuel Lutheran School (Tawas City)
- Holy Family School (East Tawas)
- Shady Grove School (Whittemore)

Alpena Community College offers college-level courses at its campus on the former Wurtsmith Air Force Base in Oscoda and local public school facilities.

== Media ==
- The Iosco County News-Herald is the newspaper of record for Iosco County.
- The Oscoda Press is a weekly newspaper serving northern Iosco County and southern Alcona County.

== See also ==
- List of Michigan State Historic Sites in Iosco County, Michigan
- National Register of Historic Places listings in Iosco County, Michigan
