= Hale, Michigan =

- Unincorporated community
- Location within Michigan Location within the United States
- Coordinates: 44°22′40″N 83°48′17″W
- Country: United States
- State: Michigan
- County: Iosco
- Township: Plainfield
- Settled: 1880
- Elevation: 856 ft (261 m)
- Time zone: UTC-5 (Eastern (EST))
  - Summer (DST): UTC-4 (EDT)
- ZIP code(s): 48739
- Area code: 989
- GNIS feature ID: 627611

Hale is an unincorporated community in Iosco County in the U.S. state of Michigan. As an unincorporated community, Hale has no legally defined boundaries or population statistics of its own, but does have its own post office with the 48739 ZIP Code.

Hale is home to the annual Iosco County Fair.

== History ==
Around 1880, a lumberman named C.D. Hale traveled to the area from New York State, establishing a lumber camp on the eponymous Hale Lake. In 1886, a flag station on the Detroit, Bay City & Alpena Railroad was established here, bearing the name 'Hale'. A post office opened in the community on January 17, 1889. The railroad line through the community was removed in 1930.

The inaugural Iosco County Fair took place in Hale in 1944.

== Geography ==
Hale is located in Plainfield Township, in northwestern Iosco County. The community is located in the northeastern Lower Peninsula of Michigan.

The community is located about 16 miles (26 km) northwest of the county seat, Tawas City, and about 21 miles (34 km) northeast of West Branch.

=== Major highway ===
- M-65 is a north–south state trunkline highway, known as 'Washington Street' within the community.

== Education ==
Hale is served by Hale Area Schools. The district operates an elementary, middle, and high school within the community, with teams known as the "Eagles".
