= Plainfield Township, Iosco County, Michigan =

Plainfield Township, Michigan
- Civil township
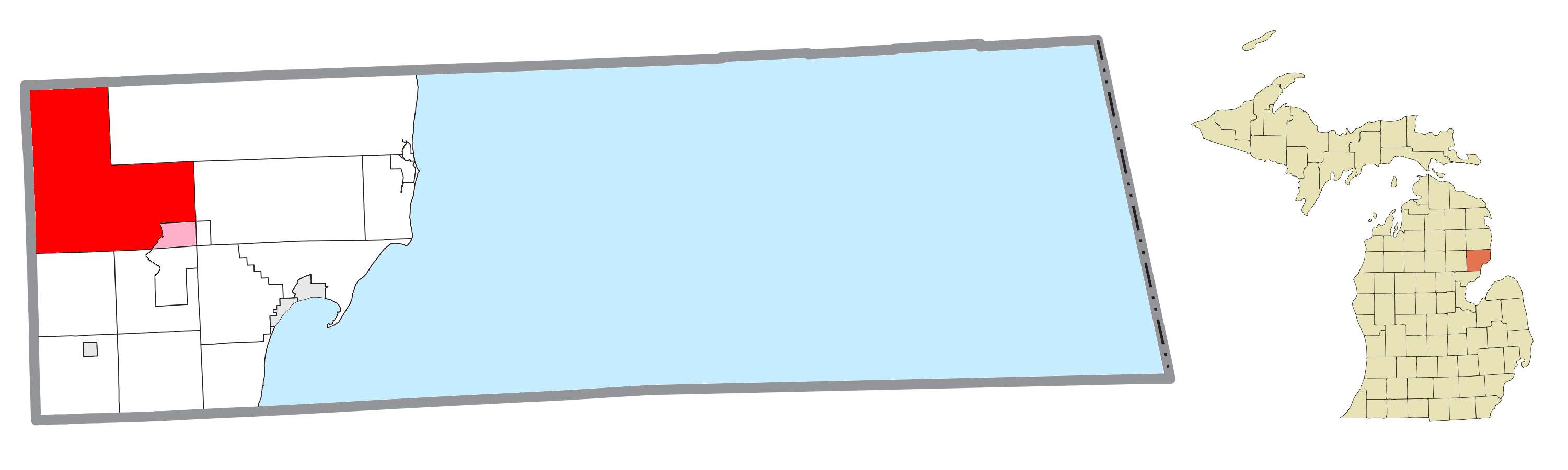
- Location within Iosco County (red) and an administered portion of the Sand Lake CDP (pink)

- Location within the state of Michigan Location within the United States
- Coordinates: 44°24′18″N 83°46′48″W
- Country: United States
- State: Michigan
- County: Iosco

Area
  - Total: 107.6 sq mi (278.7 km^{2})
  - Land: 103.8 sq mi (268.8 km^{2})
  - Water: 3.8 sq mi (9.9 km^{2})
- Elevation: 850 ft (259 m)

Population (2020)
  - Total: 3,350
  - Density: 32.3/sq mi (12.5/km^{2})
- Time zone: UTC-5 (EST)
  - Summer (DST): UTC-4 (EDT)
- Area code: 989
- FIPS code: 26-64640
- GNIS feature ID: 1626911

Plainfield Township is a civil township of Iosco County in the U.S. state of Michigan. The population was 3,350 at the 2020 census, down from 3,799 at the 2010 census.

== Communities ==
- Esmond was the name of a post office in this township from 1886 until 1889.
- Hale is a small community within the township at M-65 and Esmond Road. The Iosco County Fairgrounds are located in Hale.
- Long Lake is a small community within the township on the west end of Long Lake, northwest of Hale at 44°25′11″N 83°52′19″W. A post office named Long Lake with the ZIP code 48743 serves an area of the township northwest of the lake.
- Sand Lake is a census-designated place partially located within the township, as well as Grant Township and Wilber Township.
- South Branch is an unincorporated community in the northwest of the township, along the border with Ogemaw County.

== Geography ==
According to the United States Census Bureau, the township has a total area of 107.6 square miles (278.7 km^{2}), of which 103.8 square miles (268.8 km^{2}) is land and 3.8 square miles (9.9 km^{2}) (3.56%) is water.

== Demographics ==
As of the census of 2000, there were 4,292 people, 1,897 households, and 1,291 families residing in the township. The population density was 41.4 inhabitants per square mile (16.0/km^{2}). There were 4,139 housing units at an average density of 39.9 units per square mile (15.4 units/km^{2}). The racial makeup of the township was 97.60% White, 0.09% African American, 0.58% Native American, 0.12% Asian, 0.09% from other races, and 1.51% from two or more races. Hispanic or Latino of any race were 0.70% of the population.

There were 1,897 households, out of which 21.4% had children under the age of 18 living with them, 57.6% were married couples living together, 7.0% had a female householder with no husband present, and 31.9% were non-families. 28.0% of all households were made up of individuals, and 14.9% had someone living alone who was 65 years of age or older. The average household size was 2.26 and the average family size was 2.71.

In the township the population was spread out, with 21.0% under the age of 18, 4.1% from 18 to 24, 20.3% from 25 to 44, 29.3% from 45 to 64, and 25.3% who were 65 years of age or older. The median age was 49 years. For every 100 females, there were 100.2 males. For every 100 females age 18 and over, there were 98.1 males.

The median income for a household in the township was $29,220, and the median income for a family was $32,412. Males had a median income of $31,774 versus $23,446 for females. The per capita income for the township was $17,720. About 11.8% of families and 15.3% of the population were below the poverty line, including 25.5% of those under age 18 and 5.5% of those age 65 or over.
