= Alabaster Township, Michigan =

- Civil township
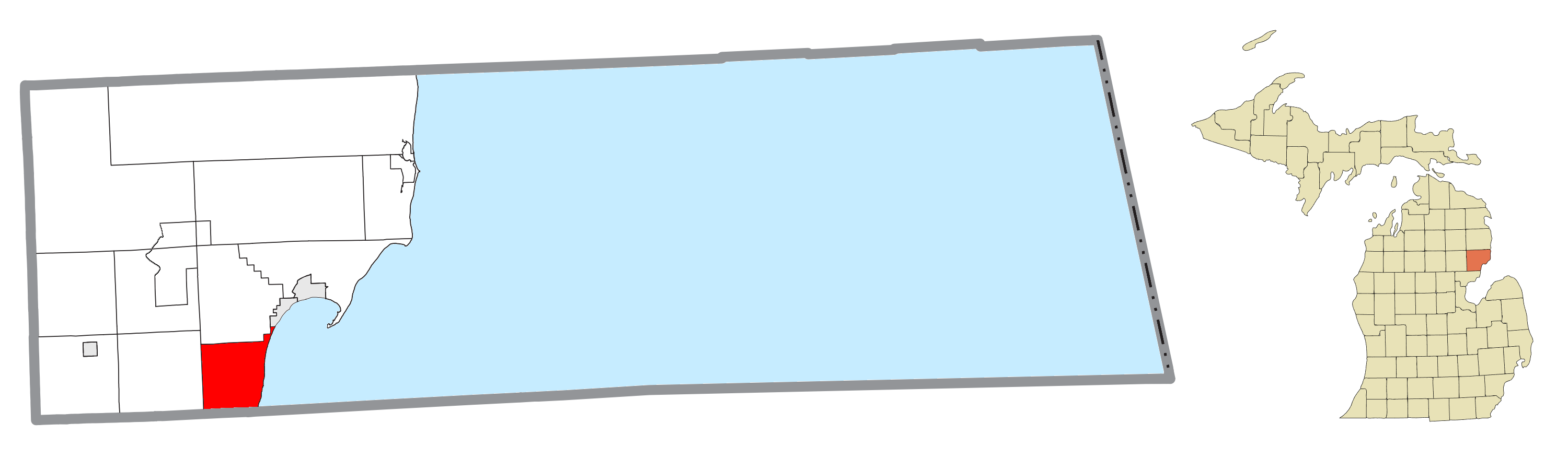
- Location within Iosco County

- Location within the state of Michigan Location within the United States
- Coordinates: 44°12′8″N 83°33′45″W
- Country: United States
- State: Michigan
- County: Iosco
- Established: 1866

Area
  - Total: 22.2 sq mi (57.4 km^{2})
  - Land: 22.2 sq mi (57.4 km^{2})
  - Water: 0 sq mi (0.0 km^{2})
- Elevation: 633 ft (193 m)

Population (2020)
  - Total: 424
  - Density: 19.1/sq mi (7.39/km^{2})
- Time zone: UTC-5 (Eastern (EST))
  - Summer (DST): UTC-4 (EDT)
- Area code: 989
- FIPS code: 26-00760
- GNIS feature ID: 1625808
- Website: https://www.alabastertownship.com/

Alabaster Township is a civil township of Iosco County in the U.S. state of Michigan. The 2020 census had the township population at 424.

== History ==
Alabaster Township was established in 1866. The 400-acre Alabaster Historic District is listed on the National Register of Historic Places.

== Geography ==
According to the United States Census Bureau, the township has a total area of 22.1 square miles (57 km^{2}), all land.

== Demographics ==
As of the 2010 census, there were 487 people, 222 households, and 172 families residing in the township. The population density was 22.7 per square mile (8.8/km^{2}). There were 470 housing units at an average density of 21.2 per square mile (8.2/km^{2}). The racial makeup of the township was 96.22% White, 1.39% Asian, 0.80% from other races, and 1.59% from two or more races. Hispanic or Latino of any race were 0.99% of the population.

There were 222 households, out of which 17.6% had children under the age of 18 living with them, 68.5% were married couples living together, 4.5% had a female householder with no husband present, and 22.1% were non-families. 18.9% of all households were made up of individuals, and 9.5% had someone living alone who was 65 years of age or older. The average household size was 2.27 and the average family size was 2.55.

In the township the population was spread out, with 14.5% under the age of 18, 4.4% from 18 to 24, 18.3% from 25 to 44, 37.2% from 45 to 64, and 25.6% who were 65 years of age or older. The median age was 53 years. For every 100 females, there were 98.0 males. For every 100 females age 18 and over, there were 99.1 males.

The median income for a household in the township was $44,000, and the median income for a family was $50,341. Males had a median income of $40,417 versus $25,500 for females. The per capita income for the township was $23,384. About 6.0% of families and 6.1% of the population were below the poverty line, including 8.3% of those under age 18 and 1.5% of those age 65 or over.
