= Tawas Township, Michigan =

- Civil township
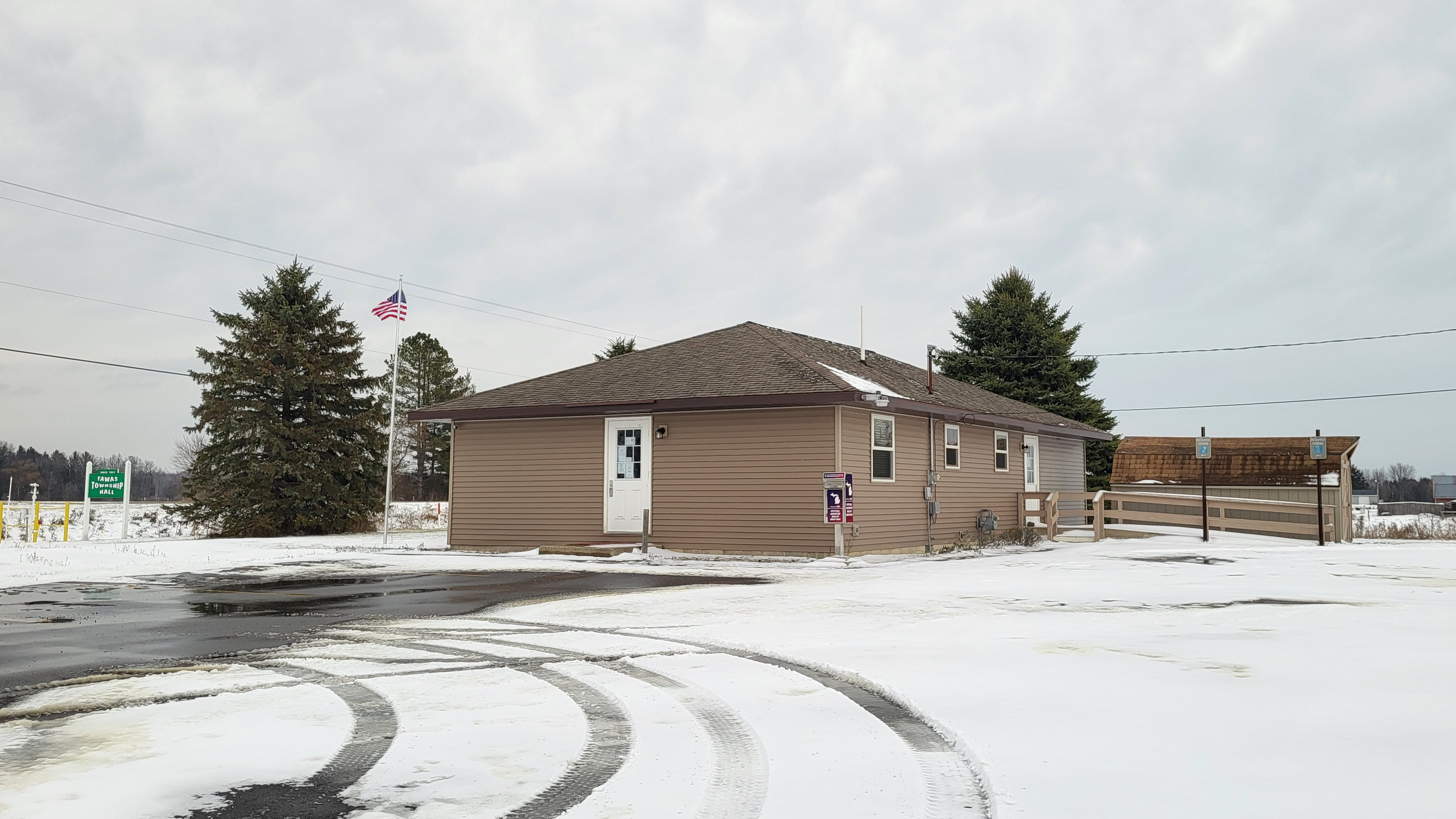
- Tawas Township Hall

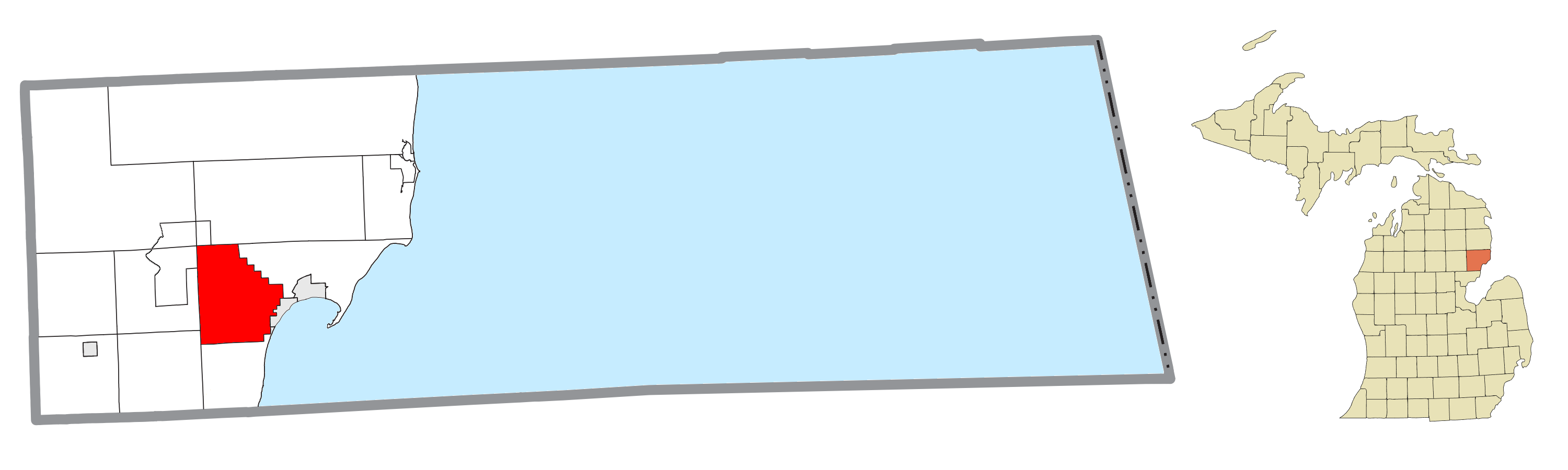
- Location within Iosco County

- Location within the state of Michigan Location within the United States
- Coordinates: 44°17′12″N 83°34′23″W
- Country: United States
- State: Michigan
- County: Iosco
- Established: 1857

Area
  - Total: 33.4 sq mi (86.6 km^{2})
  - Land: 33.4 sq mi (86.6 km^{2})
  - Water: 0 sq mi (0.0 km^{2})
- Elevation: 686 ft (209 m)

Population (2020)
  - Total: 1,733
  - Density: 51.8/sq mi (20.0/km^{2})
- Time zone: UTC-5 (Eastern (EST))
  - Summer (DST): UTC-4 (EDT)
- Area code: 989
- FIPS code: 26-78100
- GNIS feature ID: 1627151
- Website: https://www.tawastownship.com/

Tawas Township is a civil township of Iosco County in the U.S. state of Michigan. The population was 1,733 at the 2020 census. Tawas City is adjacent to the township.

== Communities ==
- Alabaster Junction is an unincorporated community located west of US 23.

== Geography ==
According to the United States Census Bureau, the township has a total area of 33.5 square miles (87 km^{2}), all land.

== Demographics ==
As of the census of 2000, there were 1,684 people, 635 households, and 485 families residing in the township. The population density was 50.4 inhabitants per square mile (19.5/km^{2}). There were 742 housing units at an average density of 22.2 per square mile (8.6/km^{2}). The racial makeup of the township was 97.92% White, 0.30% African American, 0.65% Native American, 0.42% Asian, 0.12% from other races, and 0.59% from two or more races. Hispanic or Latino of any race were 0.65% of the population.

There were 635 households, out of which 32.8% had children under the age of 18 living with them, 65.8% were married couples living together, 6.8% had a female householder with no husband present, and 23.5% were non-families. 19.2% of all households were made up of individuals, and 9.3% had someone living alone who was 65 years of age or older. The average household size was 2.55 and the average family size was 2.90.

In the township the population was spread out, with 24.5% under the age of 18, 5.3% from 18 to 24, 25.0% from 25 to 44, 25.4% from 45 to 64, and 19.8% who were 65 years of age or older. The median age was 42 years. For every 100 females, there were 96.7 males. For every 100 females age 18 and over, there were 96.9 males.

The median income for a household in the township was $37,941, and the median income for a family was $40,250. Males had a median income of $31,486 versus $20,119 for females. The per capita income for the township was $16,632. About 6.2% of families and 8.2% of the population were below the poverty line, including 10.8% of those under age 18 and 7.1% of those age 65 or over.

== Administration ==
- Supervisor: Paul Westcott
- Clerk: Melissa Stewart
- Treasurer: Sheri Grabow
- Trustee: Ervin Biggs
- Trustee: William Cholger
- Zoning Administrator: Rick Wilson

Current as of July 2006
