= Oscoda, Michigan =

- Census-designated place (CDP) & unincorporated community
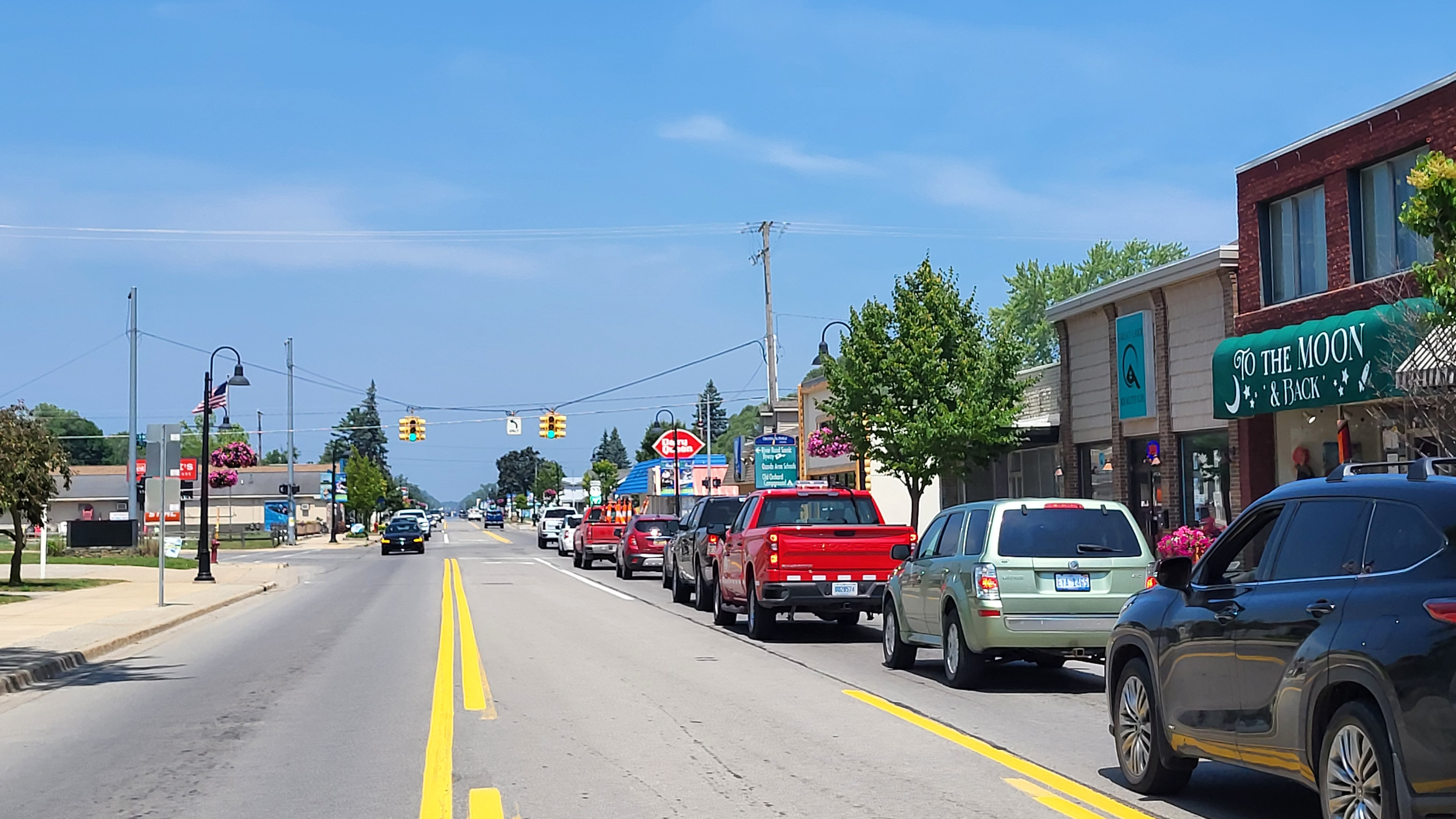
- Looking north along North State Street (US 23)

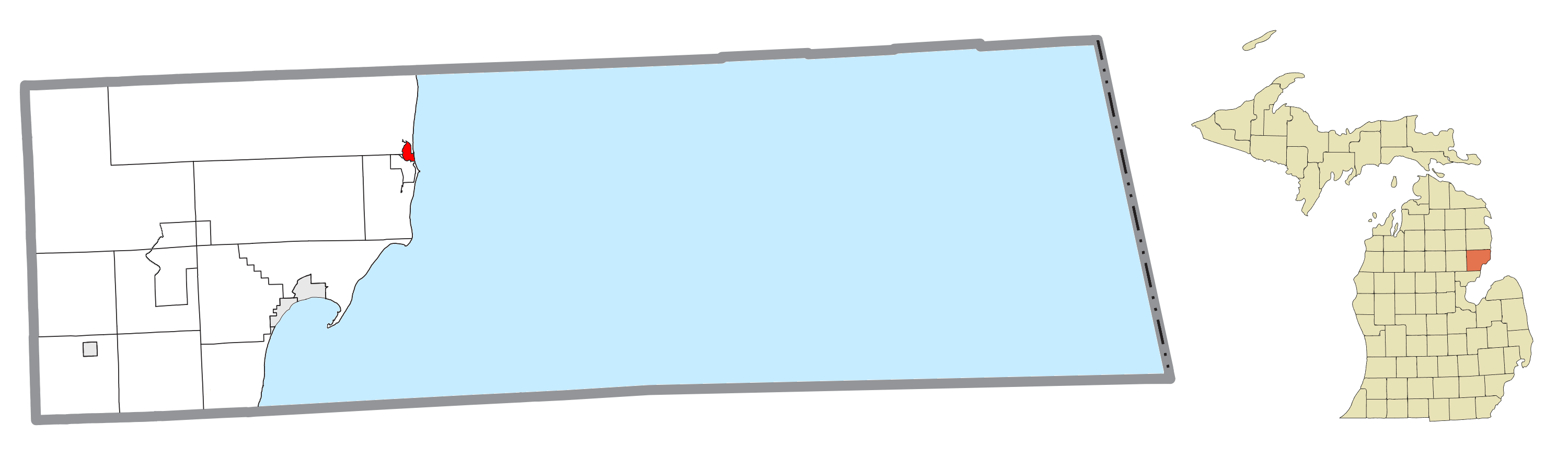
- Location within Iosco County

- Location within the state of Michigan Location within the United States
- Coordinates: 44°25′13″N 83°19′51″W
- Country: United States
- State: Michigan
- County: Iosco
- Townships: Au Sable and Oscoda
- Settled: 1867
- Incorporated: 1885
- Disincorporated: 1919

Area
  - Total: 0.95 sq mi (2.46 km^{2})
  - Land: 0.87 sq mi (2.25 km^{2})
  - Water: 0.081 sq mi (0.21 km^{2})
- Elevation: 590 ft (180 m)

Population (2020)
  - Total: 916
  - Density: 1,052/sq mi (406.3/km^{2})
- Time zone: UTC-5 (Eastern (EST))
  - Summer (DST): UTC-4 (EDT)
- ZIP code(s): 48750
- Area code: 989
- FIPS code: 26-61320
- GNIS feature ID: 634132

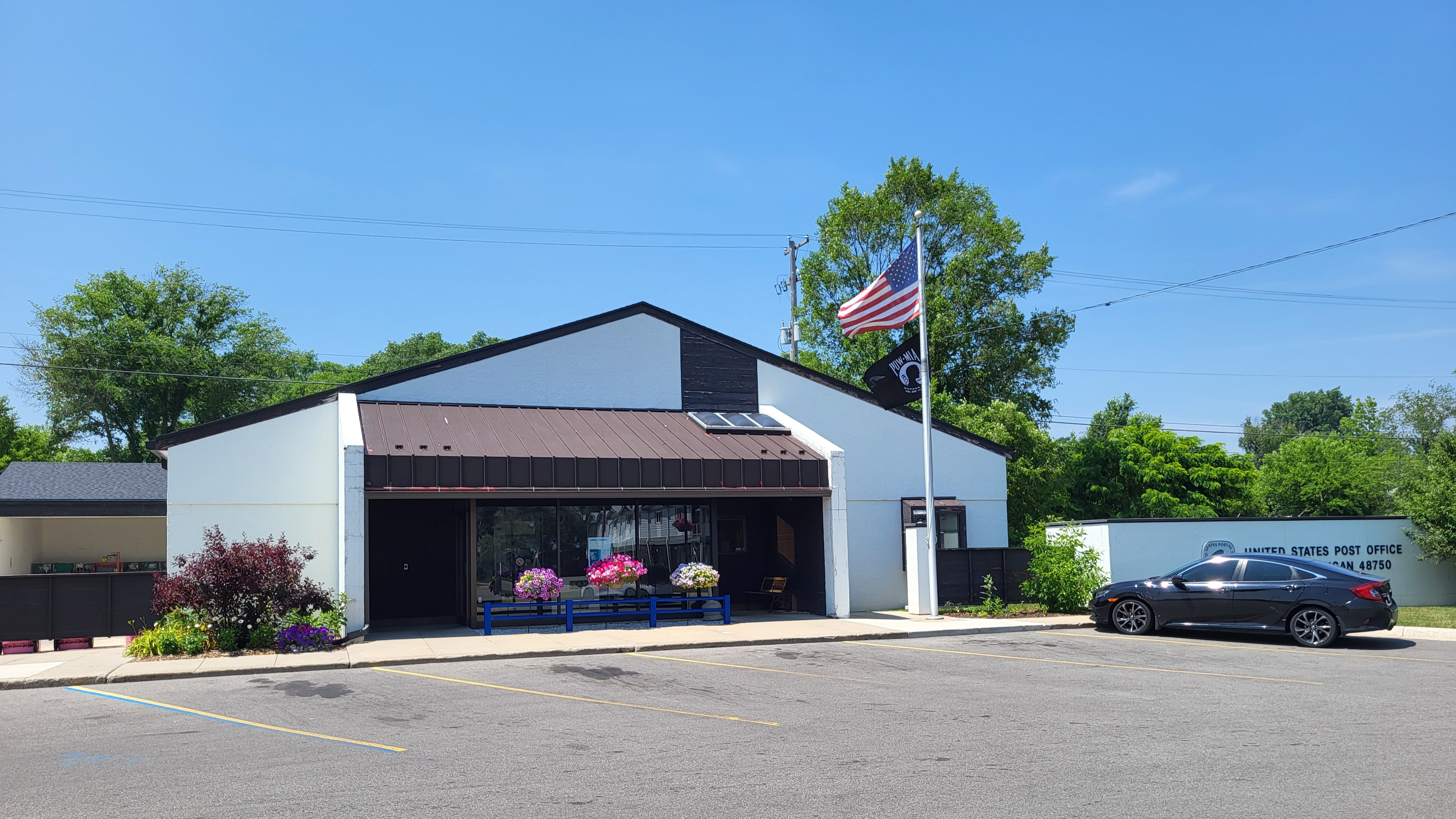
U.S. Post Office in Oscoda

Oscoda (/ɒˈskoʊdə/ ah-SKOH-də) is an unincorporated community and census-designated place (CDP) in Iosco County in the U.S. state of Michigan. The CDP had a population of 916 at the 2020 census. The community is located within Au Sable Township and Oscoda Township at the mouth of the Au Sable River along Lake Huron.

== History ==
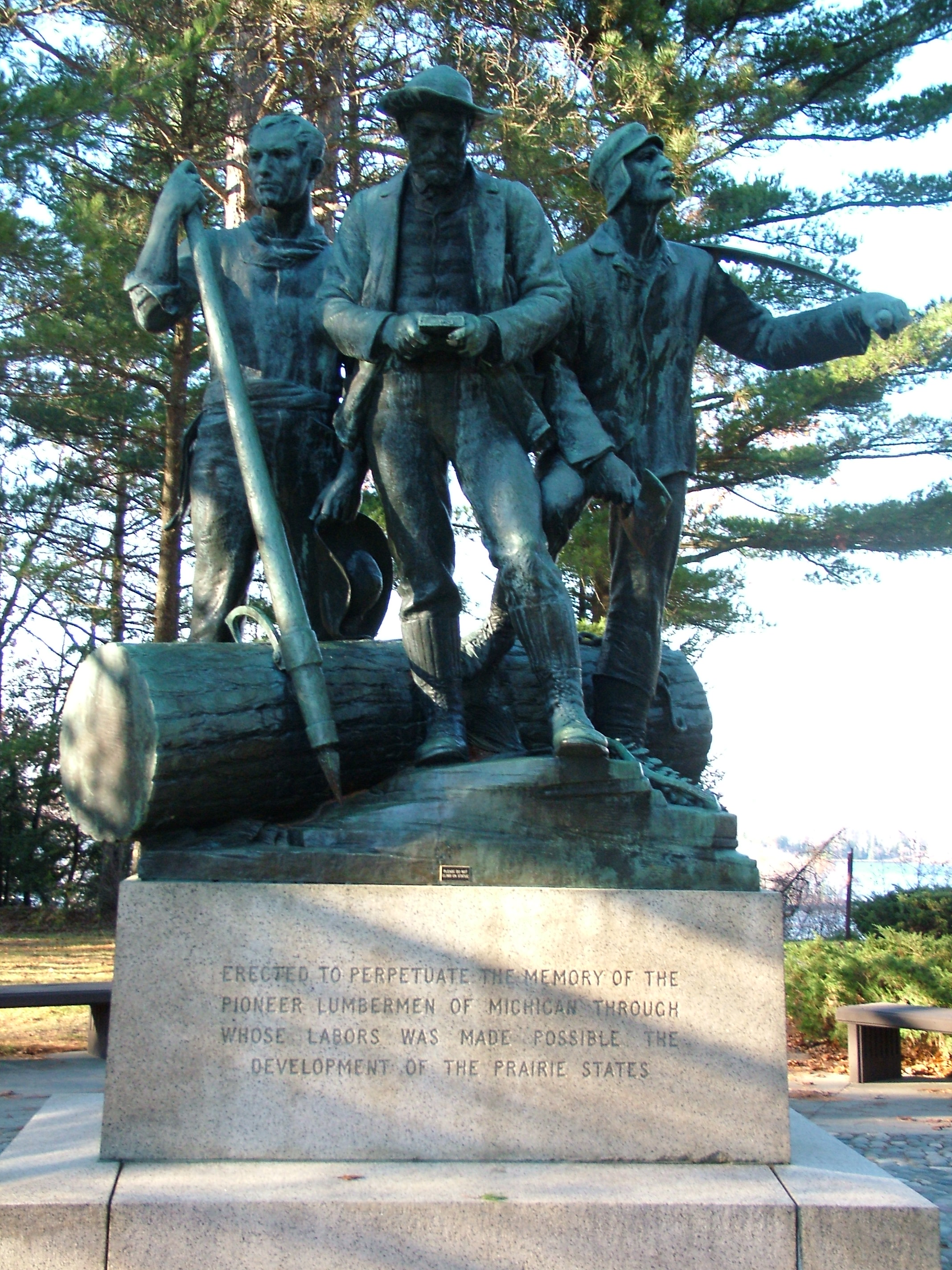
Lumberman's Monument

The area was first settled as early as 1867 when the firm of Smith, Kelley, & Dwight purchased land here and platted the community. A post office under the name Au Sable served the area until the Oscoda post office was established on July 1, 1875. The name Oscoda is believed to come from Henry Schoolcraft, who used a shortened form of ossin and muscoda, which means a pebbly prairie.

The Lumberman's Monument is located nearby and was dedicated in 1932 in honor of the early lumberjacks that first populated the area. The state of Michigan designated Oscoda as the official home of Paul Bunyan due to early documented publications in the Oscoda Press on August 10, 1906, by James MacGillivray. The article was later revised and published in The Detroit News in 1910.

Wurtsmith Air Force Base was a United States Air Force commissioned in 1923 in Oscoda. During the Cold War, it was one of the state's three Strategic Air Command bases that housed Boeing B-52 Stratofortress jets. The air base was decommissioned in 1993. The area is now an ongoing Superfund site due to extensive groundwater contamination. Parts of the defunct air base now serve as the Oscoda–Wurtsmith Airport with no future plans for the rest of the facility.

Oscoda was featured in the 2002 documentary film Bowling for Columbine, in which director Michael Moore interviewed two young residents. Eric Harris, one of the perpetrators of the Columbine High School massacre, spent some of his early years in Oscoda while his father served in the U.S. Air Force.

== Geography ==
According to the U.S. Census Bureau, the CDP has a total area of 0.95 square miles (2.46 km^{2}), of which 0.87 square miles (2.25 km^{2}) is land and 0.08 square miles (0.21 km^{2}) (8.42%) is water.

The community is located on the northside of the Au Sable River at its river mouth at Lake Huron. The community of Au Sable is on the southside of the river, and the surrounding areas are part of the Huron National Forest. Au Sable is served by Oscoda Area Schools.

The Shore to Shore Riding & Hiking Trail, which is a 220-mile-long (350 km) network of trails, has its eastern terminus in Oscoda.

=== Climate ===
This climatic region is typified by large seasonal temperature differences, with warm to hot (and often humid) summers and cold (sometimes severely cold) winters. According to the Köppen Climate Classification system, Oscoda has a humid continental climate, abbreviated "Dfb" on climate maps.

== Transportation ==
=== Airport ===
- Oscoda–Wurtsmith Airport is a public use airport that was created in 1993 from part of the disestablished Wurtsmith Air Force Base.

=== Bus ===
- Indian Trails has a station in Oscoda that is along the Owosso–St. Ignace route that follows U.S. Highway 23 at this point.

=== Major highways ===
- US 23 runs south–north along the eastern edge of the community near Lake Huron.
- F-41 has its southern terminus at US 23 in Oscoda.

== Demographics ==
Historical population
Census	Pop.	Note	%±
1890	3,593		—
1900	1,109		−69.1%
1910	864		−22.1%
1990	1,061		—
2000	992		−6.5%
2010	903		−9.0%
2020	916		1.4%
U.S. Decennial Census

As of the census of 2000, there were 992 people, 460 households, and 260 families residing in the CDP. The population density was 1,135.7 inhabitants per square mile (438.5/km^{2}). There were 599 housing units at an average density of 685.8 per square mile (264.8/km^{2}). The racial makeup of the CDP was 94.15% White, 0.40% Black or African American, 1.21% Native American, 1.71% Asian, 0.71% from other races, and 1.81% from two or more races. Hispanic or Latino of any race were 1.71% of the population.

There were 460 households, out of which 24.3% had children under the age of 18 living with them, 45.9% were married couples living together, 7.8% had a female householder with no husband present, and 43.3% were non-families. 38.9% of all households were made up of individuals, and 17.8% had someone living alone who was 65 years of age or older. The average household size was 2.14 and the average family size was 2.80.

In the CDP, 22.4% of the population was under the age of 18, 4.8% was from 18 to 24, 24.9% from 25 to 44, 26.0% from 45 to 64, and 21.9% was 65 years of age or older. The median age was 44 years. For every 100 females, there were 88.2 males. For every 100 females aged 18 and over, there were 86.4 males.

The median income for a household in the CDP was $30,000, and the median income for a family was $42,250. Males had a median income of $24,667 versus $22,772 for females. The per capita income for the CDP was $16,191. About 4.4% of families and 8.3% of the population were below the poverty line, including 6.4% of those under age 18 and none of those age 65 or over.

== Media ==
=== Newspapers ===
- The Iosco County News-Herald is the newspaper of record for Iosco County and has an office in Oscoda.
- The Oscoda Press is a weekly newspaper that serves the surrounding area.

=== Radio ===
- WCMB-FM 95.7 FM is a public radio simulcast of Central Michigan University's WCMU-FM that is broadcast in Oscoda.
- WWTH 100.7 FM is a classic rock station that is also part of the Detroit Tigers Radio Network.

== Notable people ==
- Jack Henry Abbott, author, career criminal, and convicted murderer
- Charles Pierce Davey, boxer and boxing commissioner
- Wally Gilbert, multi-sport professional athlete
- Darryl Hall, professional football player
- Charles McRae, professional football player and businessman
- Travis Van Winkle, actor
- Eric Harris, Columbine killer
