= Reno Township, Michigan =

- Civil township
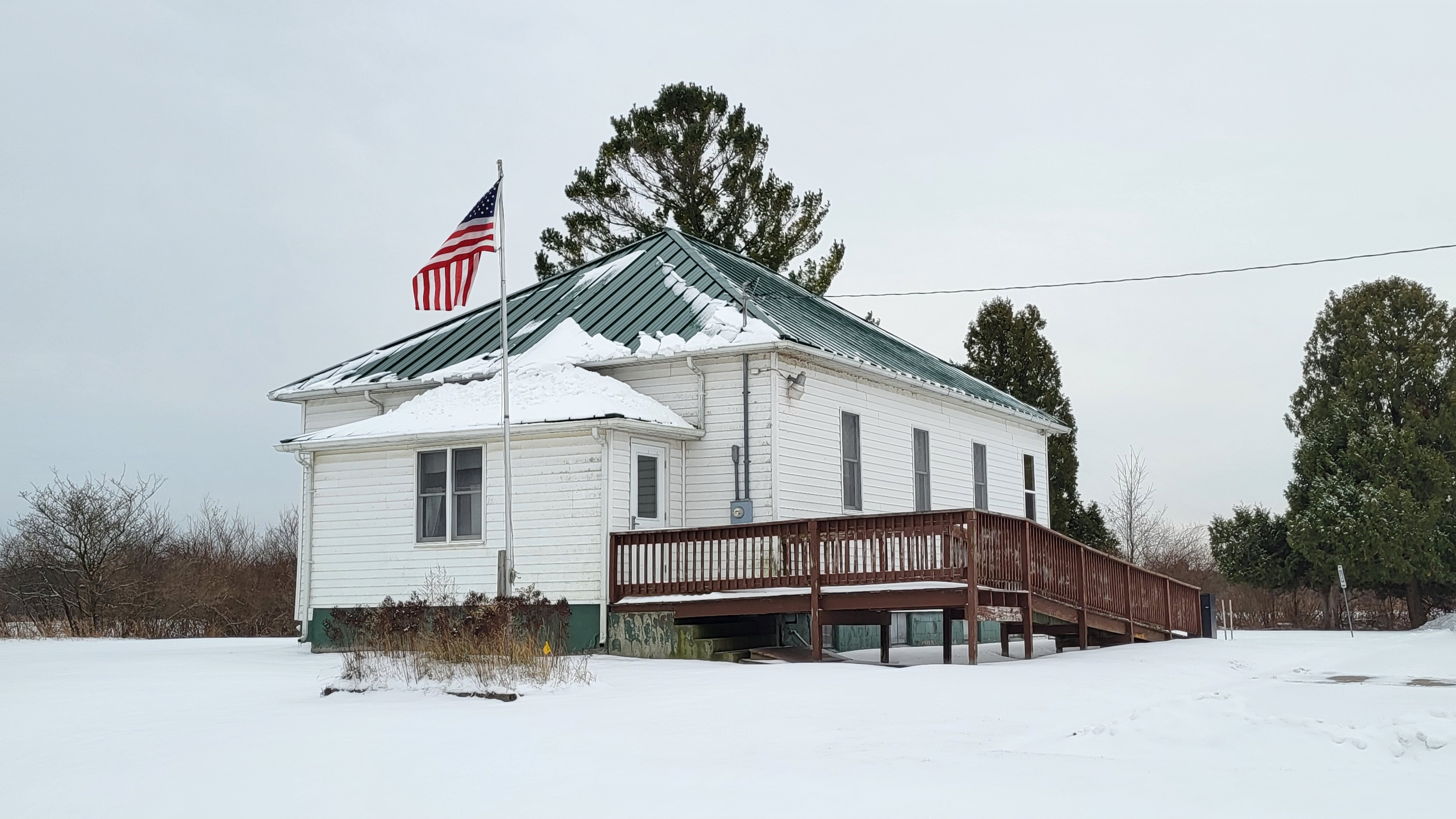
- Reno Township Hall

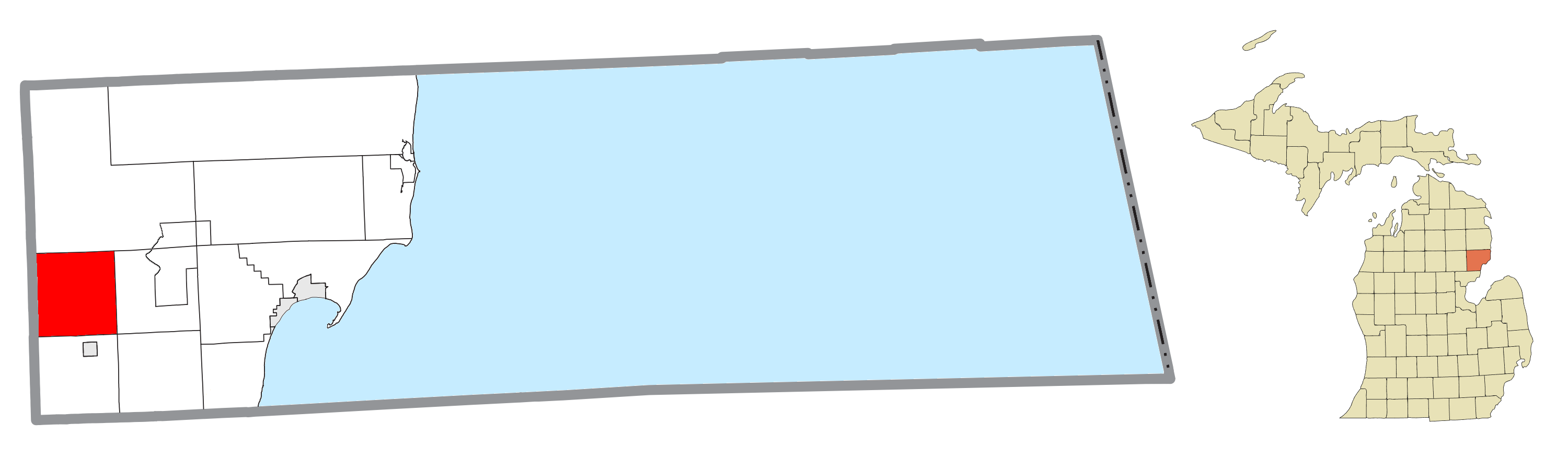
- Location within Iosco County

- Location within the state of Michigan Location within the United States
- Coordinates: 44°17′4″N 83°49′10″W
- Country: United States
- State: Michigan
- County: Iosco

Area
  - Total: 35.4 sq mi (91.7 km^{2})
  - Land: 35.4 sq mi (91.6 km^{2})
  - Water: 0.039 sq mi (0.1 km^{2})
- Elevation: 814 ft (248 m)

Population (2020)
  - Total: 632
  - Density: 17.9/sq mi (6.90/km^{2})
- Time zone: UTC-5 (Eastern (EST))
  - Summer (DST): UTC-4 (EDT)
- Area code: 989
- FIPS code: 26-67960
- GNIS feature ID: 1626963
- Website: https://renotownship.org/

Reno Township is a civil township of Iosco County in the U.S. state of Michigan. The population was 632 at the 2020 census.

== Geography ==
According to the United States Census Bureau, the township has a total area of 35.4 square miles (92 km^{2}), of which 35.3 square miles (91 km^{2}) is land and 0.1 square miles (0.26 km^{2}) (0.14%) is water.

== Demographics ==
As of the census of 2000, there were 656 people, 248 households, and 181 families residing in the township. The population density was 18.6 per square mile (7.2/km^{2}). There were 337 housing units at an average density of 9.5 per square mile (3.7/km^{2}). The racial makeup of the township was 98.48% White, 0.46% Native American, 0.30% Asian, and 0.76% from two or more races. Hispanic or Latino of any race were 0.15% of the population.

There were 248 households, out of which 24.6% had children under the age of 18 living with them, 62.9% were married couples living together, 7.7% had a female householder with no husband present, and 27.0% were non-families. 19.4% of all households were made up of individuals, and 6.0% had someone living alone who was 65 years of age or older. The average household size was 2.65 and the average family size was 2.99.

In the township the population was spread out, with 25.2% under the age of 18, 7.3% from 18 to 24, 24.4% from 25 to 44, 32.2% from 45 to 64, and 11.0% who were 65 years of age or older. The median age was 40 years. For every 100 females, there were 102.5 males. For every 100 females age 18 and over, there were 103.7 males.

The median income for a household in the township was $32,019, and the median income for a family was $36,563. Males had a median income of $25,083 versus $22,083 for females. The per capita income for the township was $14,682. About 14.4% of families and 25.2% of the population were below the poverty line, including 43.6% of those under age 18 and 16.3% of those age 65 or over.
