= Grant Township, Iosco County, Michigan =

Grant Township, Michigan
- Civil township
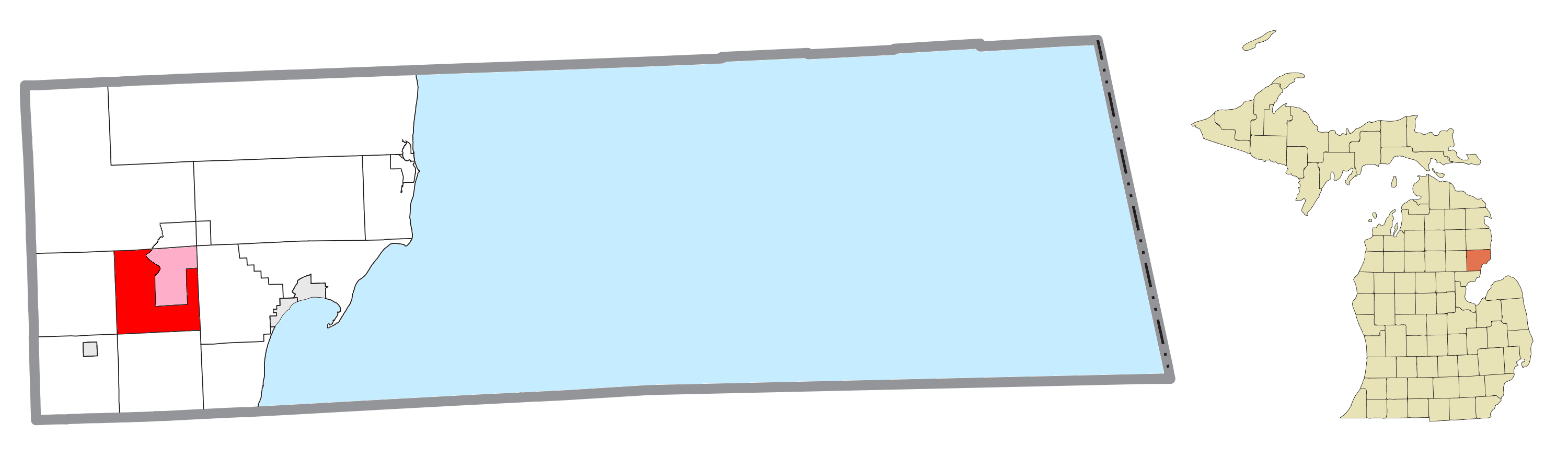
- Location within Iosco County (red) and an administered portion of the Sand Lake CDP (pink)

- Location within the state of Michigan Location within the United States
- Coordinates: 44°18′52″N 83°41′17″W
- Country: United States
- State: Michigan
- County: Iosco

Area
  - Total: 35.5 sq mi (91.9 km^{2})
  - Land: 34.9 sq mi (90.5 km^{2})
  - Water: 0.54 sq mi (1.4 km^{2})
- Elevation: 748 ft (228 m)

Population (2020)
  - Total: 1,528
  - Density: 43.7/sq mi (16.9/km^{2})
- Time zone: UTC-5 (Eastern (EST))
  - Summer (DST): UTC-4 (EDT)
- Area code: 989
- FIPS code: 26-34280
- GNIS feature ID: 1626380
- Website: https://granttwpmi.com/

Grant Township is a civil township of Iosco County in the U.S. state of Michigan. At the 2020 census the township population was 1,528. A portion of the census-designated place of Sand Lake lies within the township.

== Geography ==
According to the United States Census Bureau, the township has a total area of 35.5 square miles (92 km^{2}), of which 34.9 square miles (90 km^{2}) is land and 0.6 square miles (1.6 km^{2}) (1.55%) is water.

== Demographics ==
At the census of 2000, there were 1,560 people, 700 households, and 471 families residing in the township. The population density was 44.7 inhabitants per square mile (17.3/km^{2}). There were 1,576 housing units at an average density of 45.1 per square mile (17.4/km^{2}). The racial makeup of the township was 97.95% White, 0.13% African American, 0.45% Native American, 0.19% Asian, 0.06% from other races, and 1.22% from two or more races. Hispanic or Latino of any race were 0.58% of the population.

There were 700 households, out of which 22.3% had children under the age of 18 living with them, 56.7% were married couples living together, 6.6% had a female householder with no husband present, and 32.6% were non-families. 28.0% of all households were made up of individuals, and 11.7% had someone living alone who was 65 years of age or older. The average household size was 2.22 and the average family size was 2.65.

In the township the population was spread out, with 19.6% under the age of 18, 4.6% from 18 to 24, 22.4% from 25 to 44, 31.2% from 45 to 64, and 22.3% who were 65 years of age or older. The median age was 48 years. For every 100 females, there were 102.6 males. For every 100 females age 18 and over, there were 98.1 males.

The median income for a household in the township was $27,625, and the median income for a family was $33,375. Males had a median income of $32,321 versus $18,750 for females. The per capita income for the township was $16,708. About 12.6% of families and 15.0% of the population were below the poverty line, including 22.1% of those under age 18 and 9.6% of those age 65 or over.
