= Baldwin Township, Iosco County, Michigan =

Baldwin Township, Michigan
- Civil township
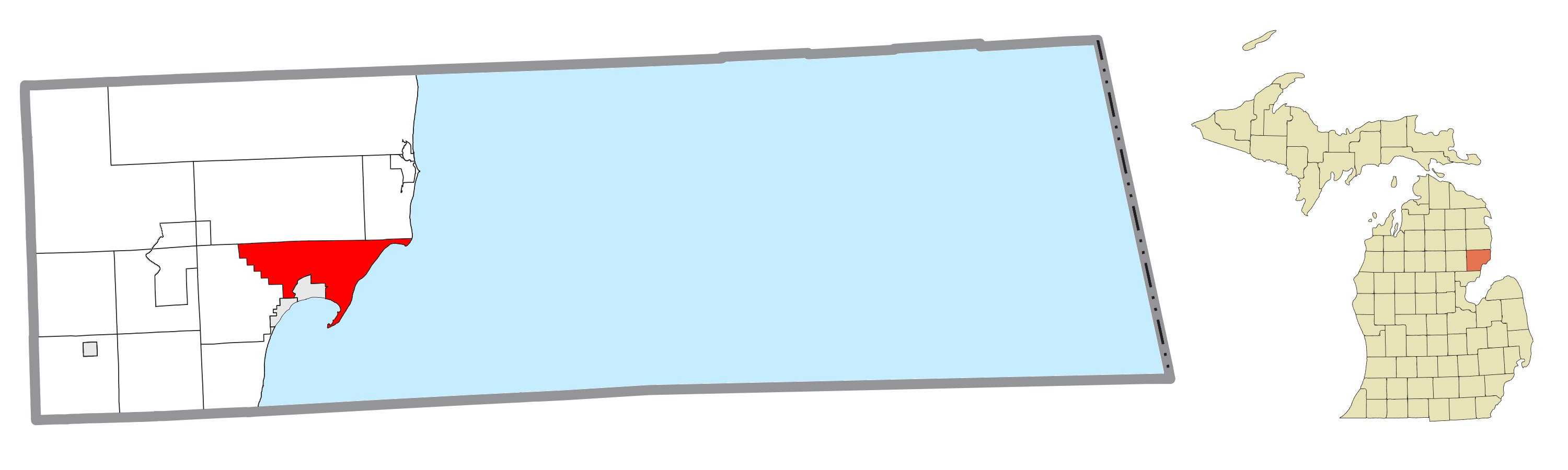
- Location within Iosco County

- Location within the state of Michigan Location within the United States
- Coordinates: 44°19′19″N 83°27′17″W
- Country: United States
- State: Michigan
- County: Iosco

Area
  - Total: 31.3 sq mi (81.1 km^{2})
  - Land: 28.4 sq mi (73.6 km^{2})
  - Water: 2.9 sq mi (7.5 km^{2})
- Elevation: 584 ft (178 m)

Population (2020)
  - Total: 1,614
  - Density: 56.8/sq mi (21.9/km^{2})
- Time zone: UTC-5 (Eastern (EST))
  - Summer (DST): UTC-4 (EDT)
- Area code: 989
- FIPS code: 26-04920
- GNIS feature ID: 1625876
- Website: www.baldwintwpiosco.gov

Baldwin Township is a civil township of Iosco County in the U.S. state of Michigan. As of the 2020 census, the township population was 1,614.

== Geography ==
According to the United States Census Bureau, the township has a total area of 31.3 square miles (81 km^{2}), of which 28.4 square miles (74 km^{2}) is land and 2.9 square miles (7.5 km^{2}) (9.20%) is water.

== Demographics ==
As of the census of 2000, there were 1,726 people, 754 households, and 523 families residing in the township. The population density was 60.7 inhabitants per square mile (23.4/km^{2}). There were 1,370 housing units at an average density of 48.2 per square mile (18.6/km^{2}). The racial makeup of the township was 96.99% White, 0.23% African American, 1.10% Native American, 0.70% Asian, 0.12% Pacific Islander, and 0.87% from two or more races. Hispanic or Latino of any race were 0.81% of the population.

There were 754 households, out of which 24.0% had children under the age of 18 living with them, 58.0% were married couples living together, 8.1% had a female householder with no husband present, and 30.6% were non-families. 25.6% of all households were made up of individuals, and 11.4% had someone living alone who was 65 years of age or older. The average household size was 2.28 and the average family size was 2.71.

In the township the population was spread out, with 21.1% under the age of 18, 6.0% from 18 to 24, 21.0% from 25 to 44, 30.8% from 45 to 64, and 21.1% who were 65 years of age or older. The median age was 47 years. For every 100 females, there were 99.5 males. For every 100 females age 18 and over, there were 93.0 males.

The median income for a household in the township was $29,783, and the median income for a family was $33,889. Males had a median income of $29,952 versus $21,615 for females. The per capita income for the township was $17,367. About 7.9% of families and 9.2% of the population were below the poverty line, including 9.5% of those under age 18 and 8.7% of those age 65 or over.
