= Flight 164 =

Flight 164 may refer to:

Listed chronologically

- Aeroflot Flight 164, crashed on 7 September 1958
- Aer Lingus Flight 164, hijacked on 2 May 1981
- Centurion Air Cargo Flight 164, crashed on 7 July 2008
