= Kalitta Air =

American cargo airline

- Kalitta Air Boeing 747-400BCF
IATA	ICAO	Call sign
K4	CKS	CONNIE
- Founded: 1967; 59 years ago (as Connie Kalitta Services); November 2000; 26 years ago (as Kalitta Air)
- AOC #: KCSA712A
- Hubs: Anchorage; Cincinnati/Northern Kentucky; Hong Kong; Leipzig/Halle; Los Angeles; New York–JFK
- Fleet size: 38
- Destinations: 25 (scheduled)
- Headquarters: Ypsilanti Charter Township, Michigan, U.S.
- Key people: Connie Kalitta (CEO)
- Website: www.kalittaair.us

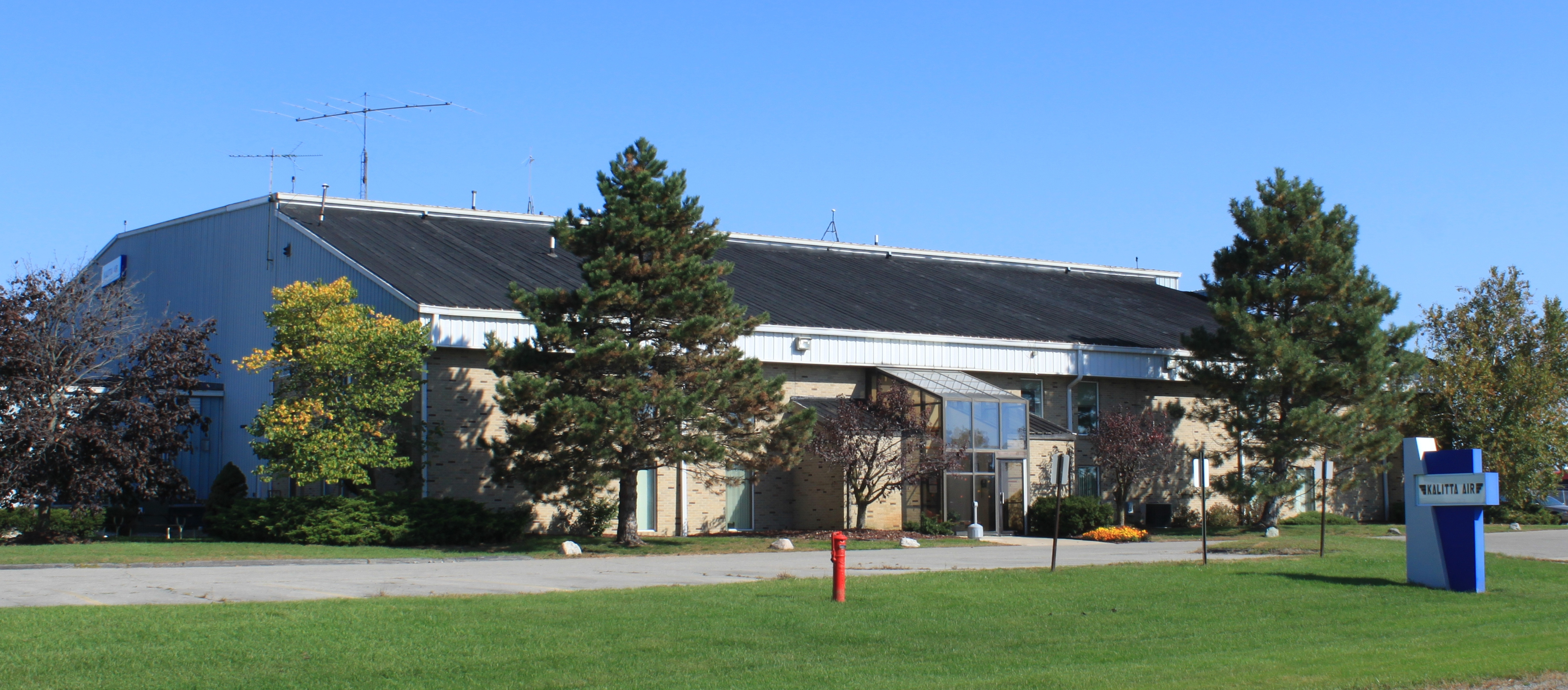
The Kalitta Air headquarters in Ypsilanti Charter Township, Michigan

Kalitta Air is an American cargo airline headquartered at Willow Run Airport, Ypsilanti Charter Township, Michigan. The company operates international scheduled and cargo charter services. Its call sign "Connie" is from its founder, Connie Kalitta.

== History ==
In 1967, Conrad "Connie" Kalitta started the airline as Connie Kalitta Services, a business carrying car parts using a twin engine Cessna 310 that he piloted. The airline's name would later become American International Airways in 1984. At this point, the fleet consisted of Boeing 747, Lockheed L-1011 TriStar, Douglas DC-8, Twin Beech, and Learjet aircraft, for air freight, air ambulance, and charter passenger operations.

The American International Airways brand name was also used by a charter and scheduled passenger airline which in 1981 was operating a hub located at the Philadelphia International Airport with nonstop service to Atlantic City, Boston, Chicago Midway, Cleveland, Detroit, Fort Lauderdale, Miami, Norfolk, Orlando, Pittsburgh, Tampa, and West Palm Beach flown with McDonnell Douglas DC-9-30 and MD-80 jets. The airline declared bankruptcy on July 19, 1984, and ceased operations in September. Kalitta, however, continued using the AIA name, as "Kalitta|American International Airways" for cargo-only flights until 1997.

During the late 1980s, the Kalitta brand name continued to appear on many of the company's cargo aircraft. In 1990 and 1991, AIA flew 600 missions in support of Operations Desert Shield and Desert Storm.

In 1997, AIA merged with Kitty Hawk Inc., and Conrad Kalitta resigned to start Kalitta Leasing for buying, selling, and leasing large aircraft. In April 2000, Kitty Hawk International (the former AIA) ceased operations. Kalitta decided to rescue it, and the new airline, Kalitta Air, began operations in November 2000, using the operating certificate and assets of the former airline.

On the evening of September 11, 2001, Kalitta Air was one of the first cargo airline to fly across the United States to transport essential medical supplies, after the country's airspace was closed by the Federal Aviation Administration. Flying from Los Angeles to Philadelphia, the airline's Boeing 747-100F (N709CK) flew direct to Philadelphia. A Kalitta Air loadmaster, Michael Manbeck, describes the route clearance as extraordinary. "That is unheard of," Michael says. "They will hand you off to the next sector, but never direct."

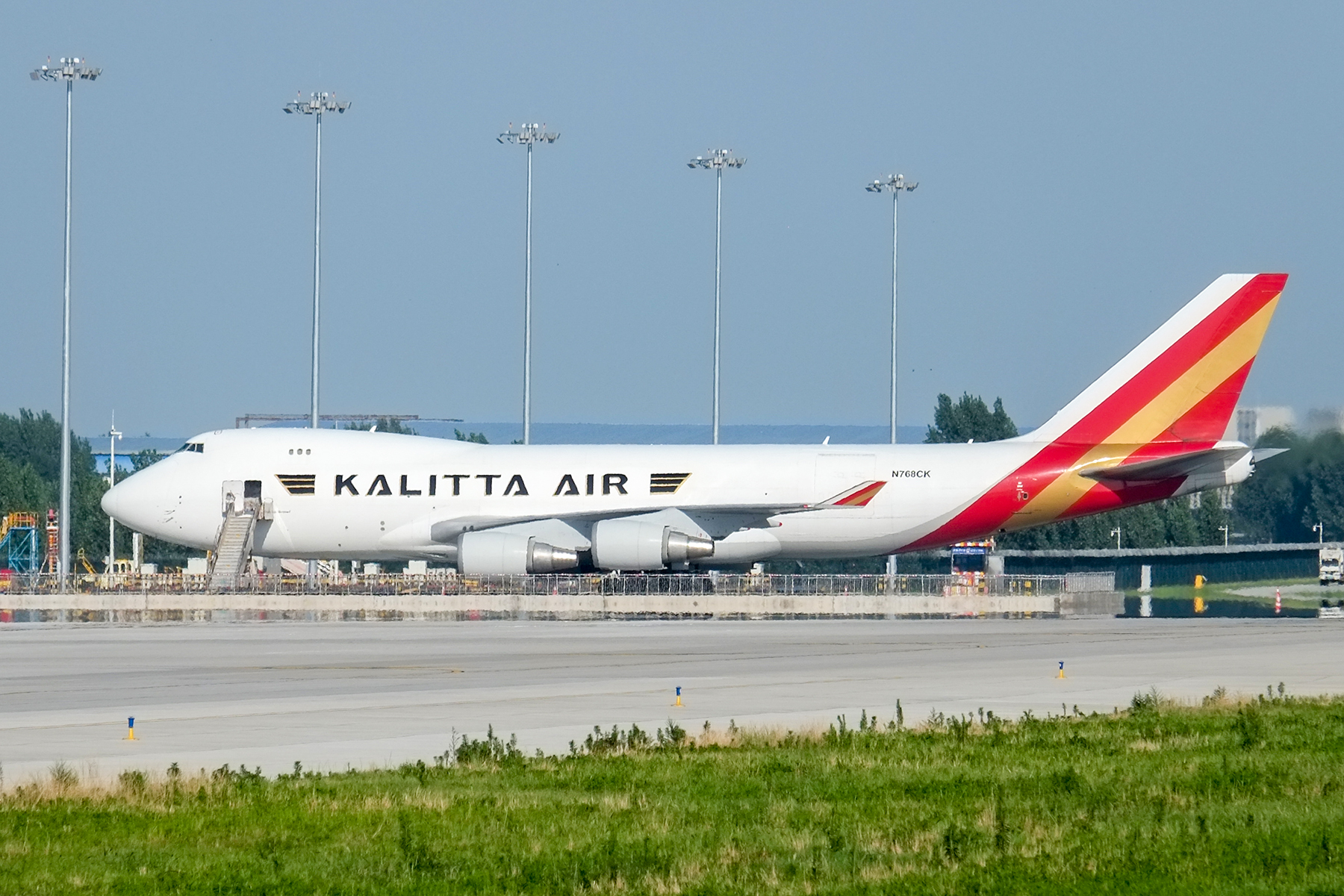
Kalitta Air Boeing 747-400F

On April 21, 2017, Kalitta Air retired its final Boeing 747-200F from service. This was one of the relatively few then remaining in service. Twenty-six other Boeing 747 aircraft are still active in Kalitta's fleet.

Kalitta Maintenance operates a maintenance, repair, and overhaul facility at Oscoda–Wurtsmith Airport in Iosco County, Michigan.

In 2020, the United States Department of State employed Kalitta Air to evacuate U.S. nationals from Wuhan at the outbreak of the COVID-19 pandemic. Citing instructions from the State Department, director of operations Pete Sanderlin declined to give the Detroit Free Press comment. The National Museum of American Diplomacy's collection of artifacts includes a commemorative patch honoring the "Wuhan Evac Team" featuring a Kalitta Air plane. It has the dates "01-27-20 to 02-08-20" and four N-numbers, N705CK, N706CK, N708CK, and N713CK.

In 2026, Kalitta Air was again used to transport U.S. nationals back to the United States during the MV Hondius hantavirus outbreak. Passengers were transported aboard a 747-400 aircraft (N767CK) to Nebraska and Georgia for further quarantine and evaluation.

== Destinations ==
The airline provides domestic and international scheduled or on-demand cargo service and support for the requirements of the Department of Defense Air Mobility Command.

In January 2003, Kalitta Air announced the start of scheduled cargo flights from the United States to Europe. The freighters on this service operated from JFK (John F. Kennedy International Airport, New York City) to EWR (Newark Liberty International Airport, New Jersey) and ORD (O’Hare, Chicago) to AMS (Schiphol, Amsterdam, the Netherlands) and EMA (East Midlands Airport, England). The airline flies scheduled cargo operations between the U.S. and Hong Kong, U.S. and Germany (Leipzig/Halle Airport), U.S. and Korea (for Asiana), Los Angeles and Honolulu. Liège Airport was also used as a regular refueling stop on New York City – Middle East routes and in the Caribbean, Norman Manley International Airport.

As of February 2020, Kalitta Air serves the following destinations with cargo flights on a regular, scheduled basis:

Country	City	Airport	Notes	Refs
Bahrain	Manama	Bahrain International Airport		
Belgium	Brussels	Brussels Airport		
Belgium	Ostend	Ostend–Bruges International Airport		
Brazil	Campinas	Viracopos International Airport		
Bulgaria	Sofia	Sofia Airport		
Canada	Gander	Gander International Airport		
Canada	Vancouver	Vancouver International Airport		
Chile	Santiago	Arturo Merino Benítez International Airport		
China	Ezhou	Ezhou Huahu International Airport		
China	Hefei	Hefei Xinqiao International Airport		
China	Shanghai	Shanghai Pudong International Airport		
Germany	Leipzig	Leipzig/Halle Airport		
Hong Kong	Hong Kong	Hong Kong International Airport		
India	Delhi	Indira Gandhi International Airport		
Japan	Nagoya	Chubu Centrair International Airport		
Netherlands	Amsterdam	Amsterdam Airport Schiphol		
Singapore	Singapore	Changi Airport		
South Korea	Seoul	Incheon International Airport		
Taiwan	Taipei	Taoyuan International Airport		
Türkiye	Istanbul	Istanbul Airport		
United States (Alaska)	Anchorage	Elmendorf Air Force Base		
United States (Alaska)	Anchorage	Ted Stevens Anchorage International Airport		
United States (California)	Fairfield	Travis Air Force Base		
United States (California)	Los Angeles	Los Angeles International Airport		
United States (California)	San Francisco	San Francisco International Airport		
United States (Florida)	Miami	Miami International Airport		
United States (Florida)	Orlando	Orlando International Airport		
United States (Hawaii)	Honolulu	Daniel K. Inouye International Airport		
United States (Hawaii)	Kalaoa	Ellison Onizuka Kona International Airport		
United States (Illinois)	Chicago	O'Hare International Airport		
United States (Michigan)	Ypsilanti	Willow Run Airport		
United States (Michigan)	Oscoda	Oscoda–Wurtsmith Airport		
United States (New Jersey)	Newark	Newark Liberty International Airport		
United States (New York)	Newburgh	Stewart International Airport		
United States (New York)	New York City	John F. Kennedy International Airport		
United States (Kentucky)	Hebron	Cincinnati/Northern Kentucky International Airport		
United States (Texas)	Dallas	Dallas Fort Worth International Airport		
United States (Texas)	San Antonio	San Antonio International Airport		
United States (Washington)	Seattle	Seattle–Tacoma International Airport		

== Fleet ==
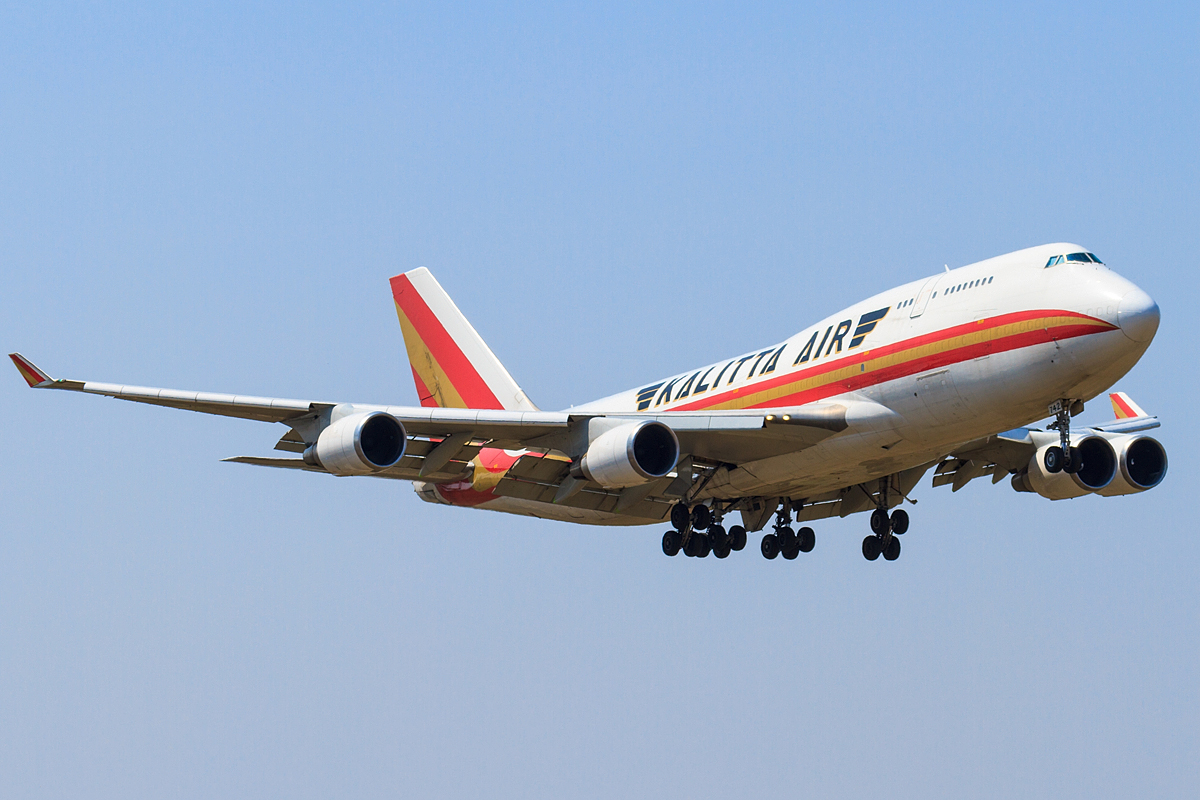
Kalitta Air Boeing 747-400BCF

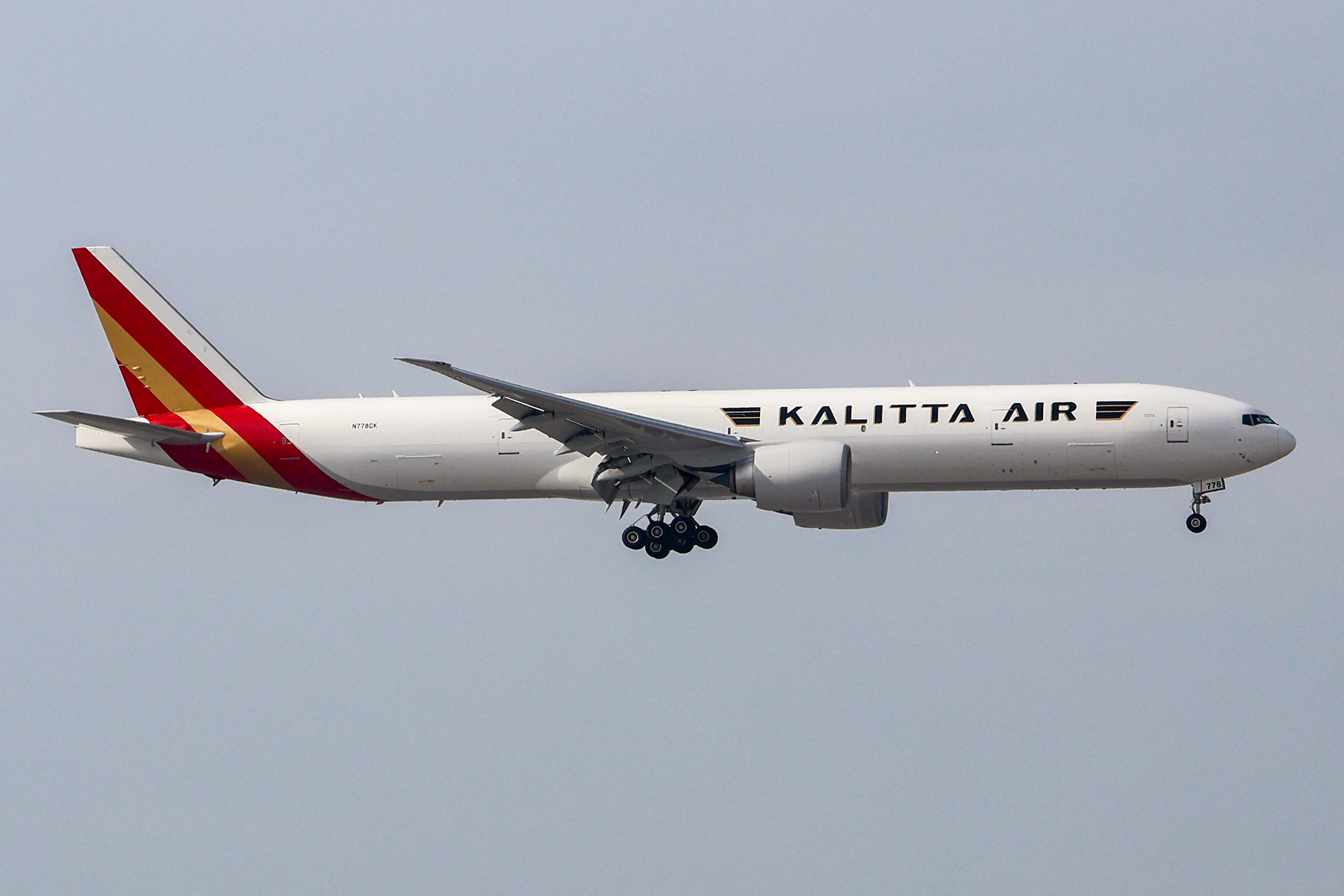
Boeing 777-36NER(SF)

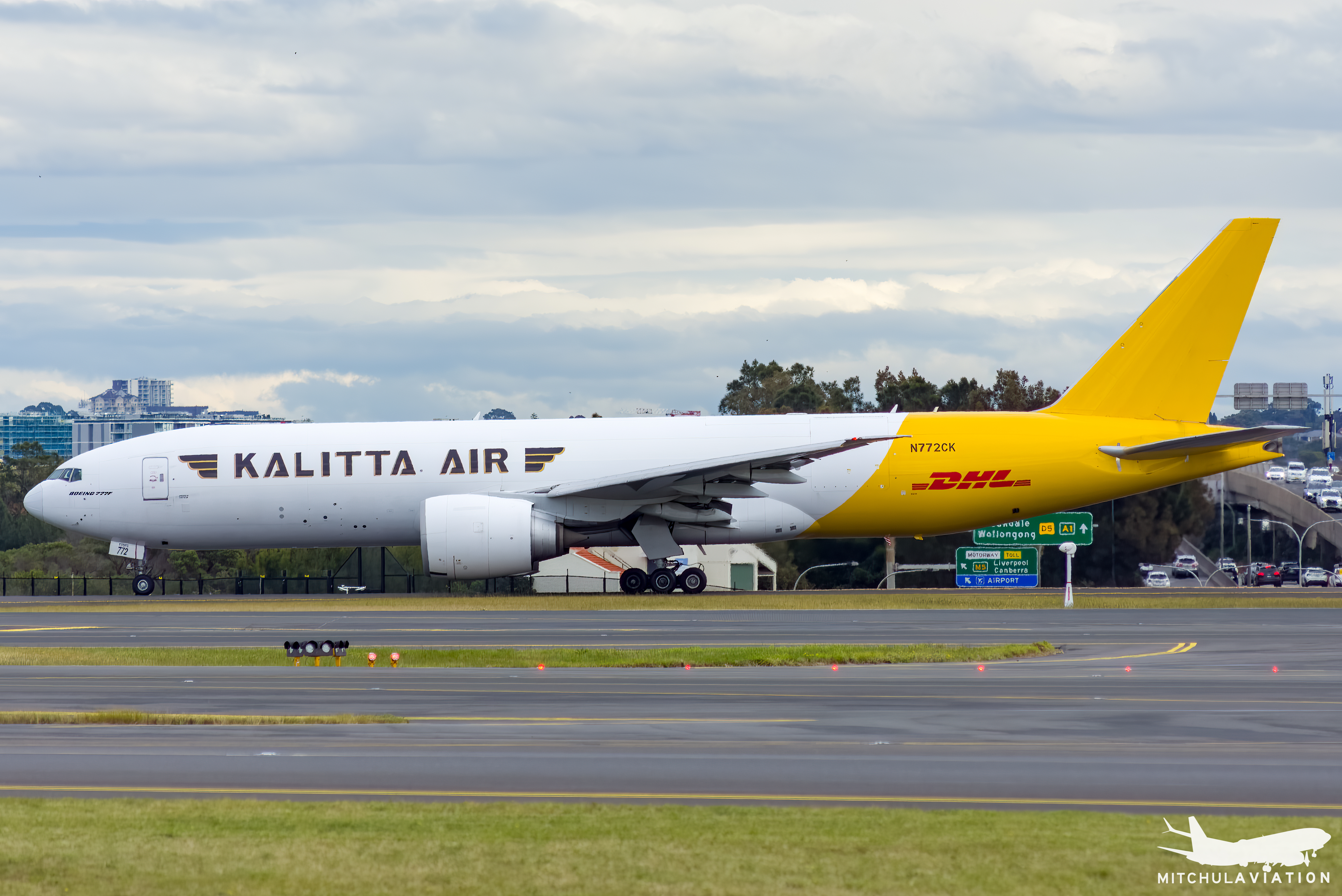
Kalitta Air Boeing 777F operated for DHL Aviation

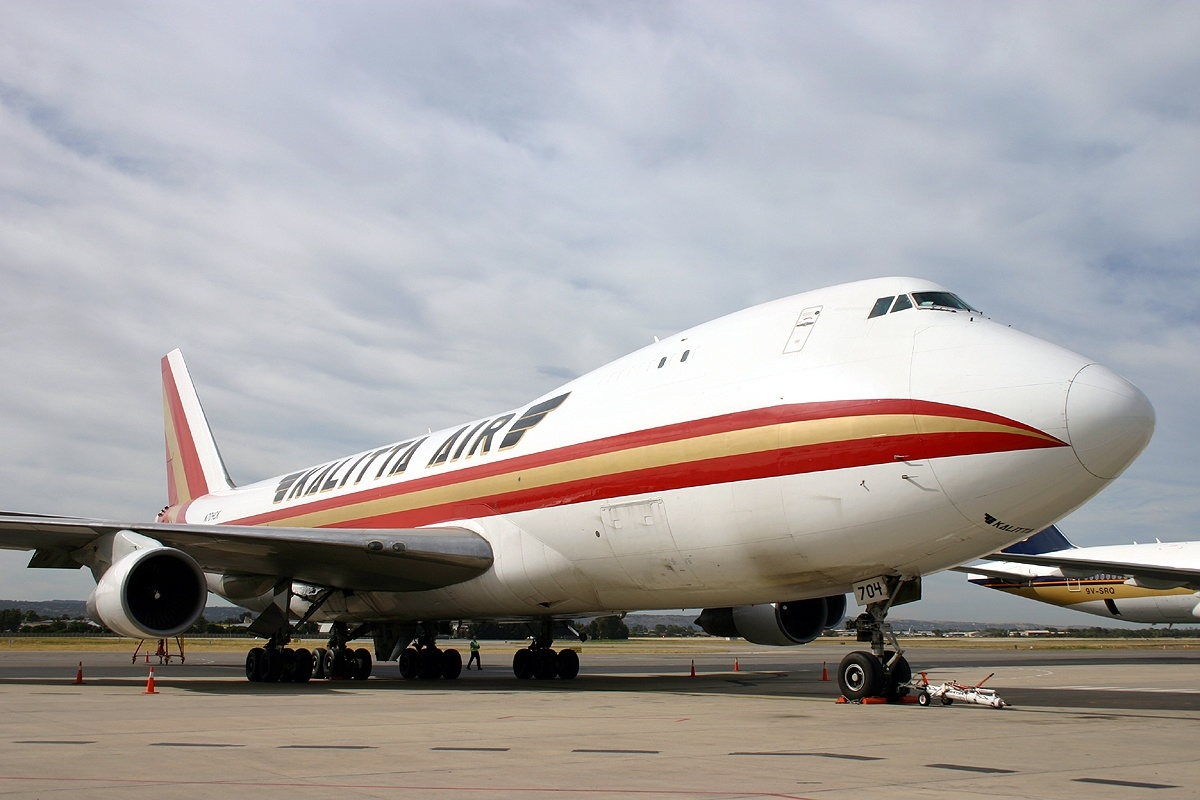
Kalitta Air Boeing 747-200F at Adelaide Airport

=== Current fleet ===
As of June 2026, Kalitta Air operates the following aircraft:

Kalitta Air fleet
Aircraft	Total	Orders	Notes
Boeing 747-400BCF	8	—	
Boeing 747-400ERF	1	—	
Boeing 747-400F	13	—	
Boeing 777F	8	—	5 operated for DHL Aviation.
Boeing 777-300ERSF	7	—	Launch customer.
Total	37	—	

=== Historical fleet ===
Kalitta Air previously operated the following aircraft types:

Historical fleet
Aircraft	Number	Introduced	Retired	Replacement	Notes
Boeing 747-200F	15	2000	2017	Boeing 747-400F	One was written off as Kalitta Air Flight 207, and another as Centurion Air Cargo Flight 164.
Boeing 767-300ERBDSF	8	2016	2022	Boeing 777-300ERSF, Boeing 777F	
Boeing 767-300BCF	1	2018	2022	Boeing 777-300ERSF, Boeing 777F	

== Photo gallery (chronological order) ==
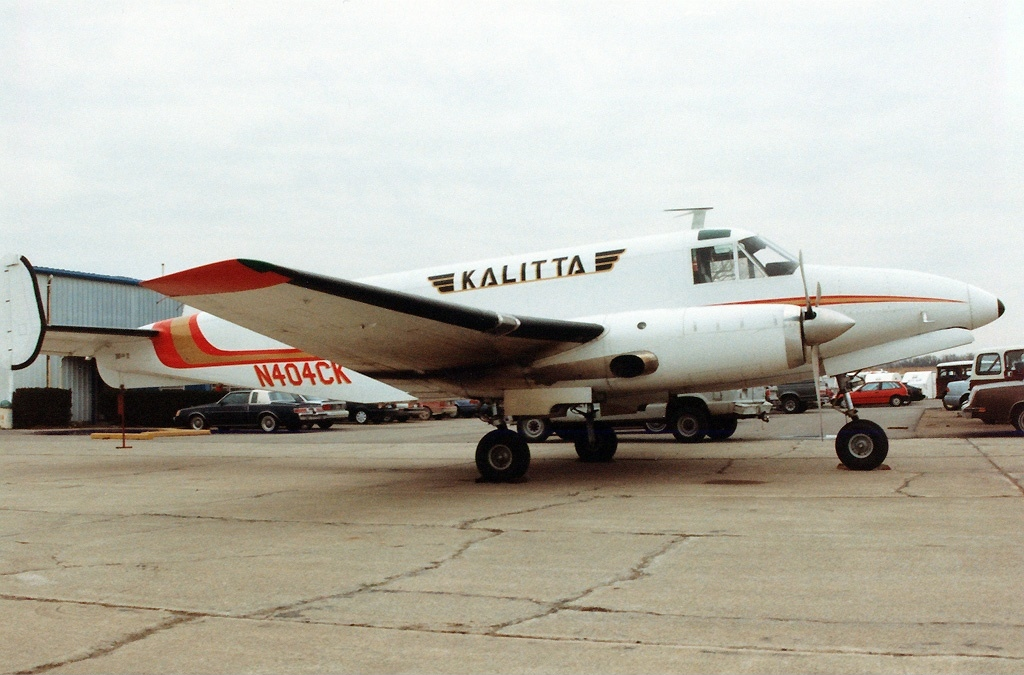
Volpar Turboliner I (converted Beechcraft 18) at Detroit, Michigan in 1993

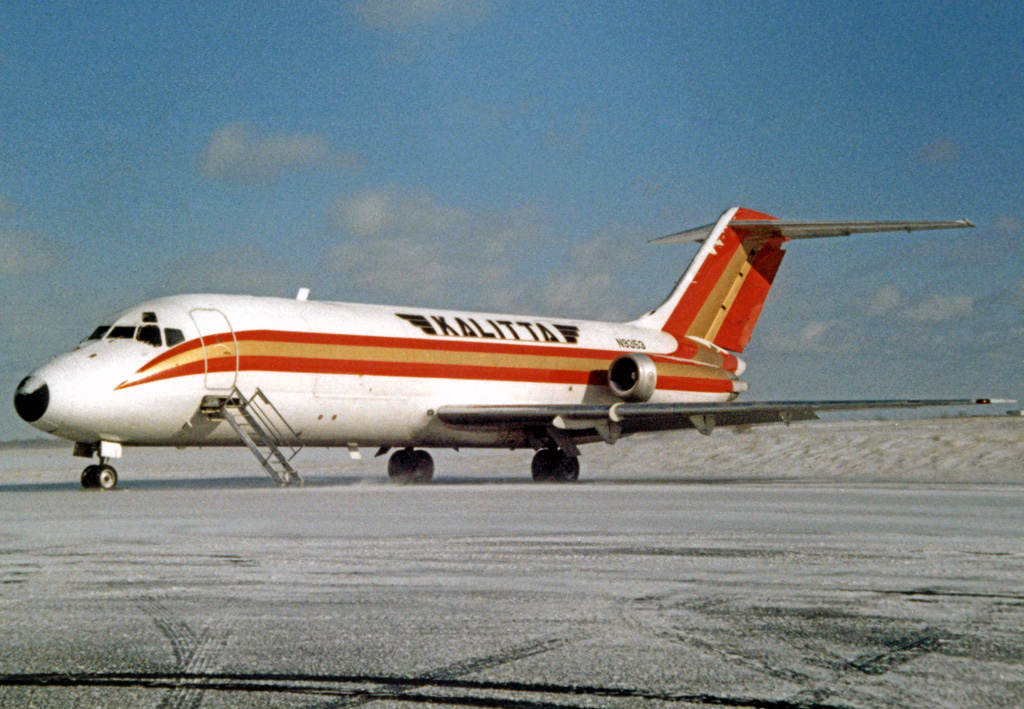
A Douglas DC-9 at Willow Run Airport in 1989

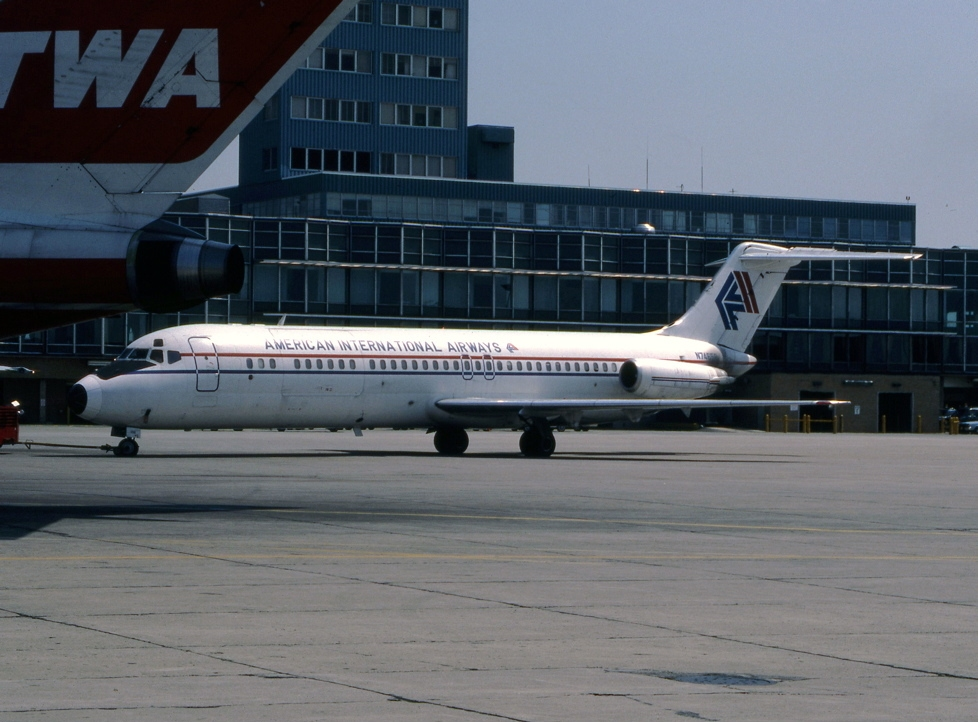
DC-9 of American International at Detroit in 1984

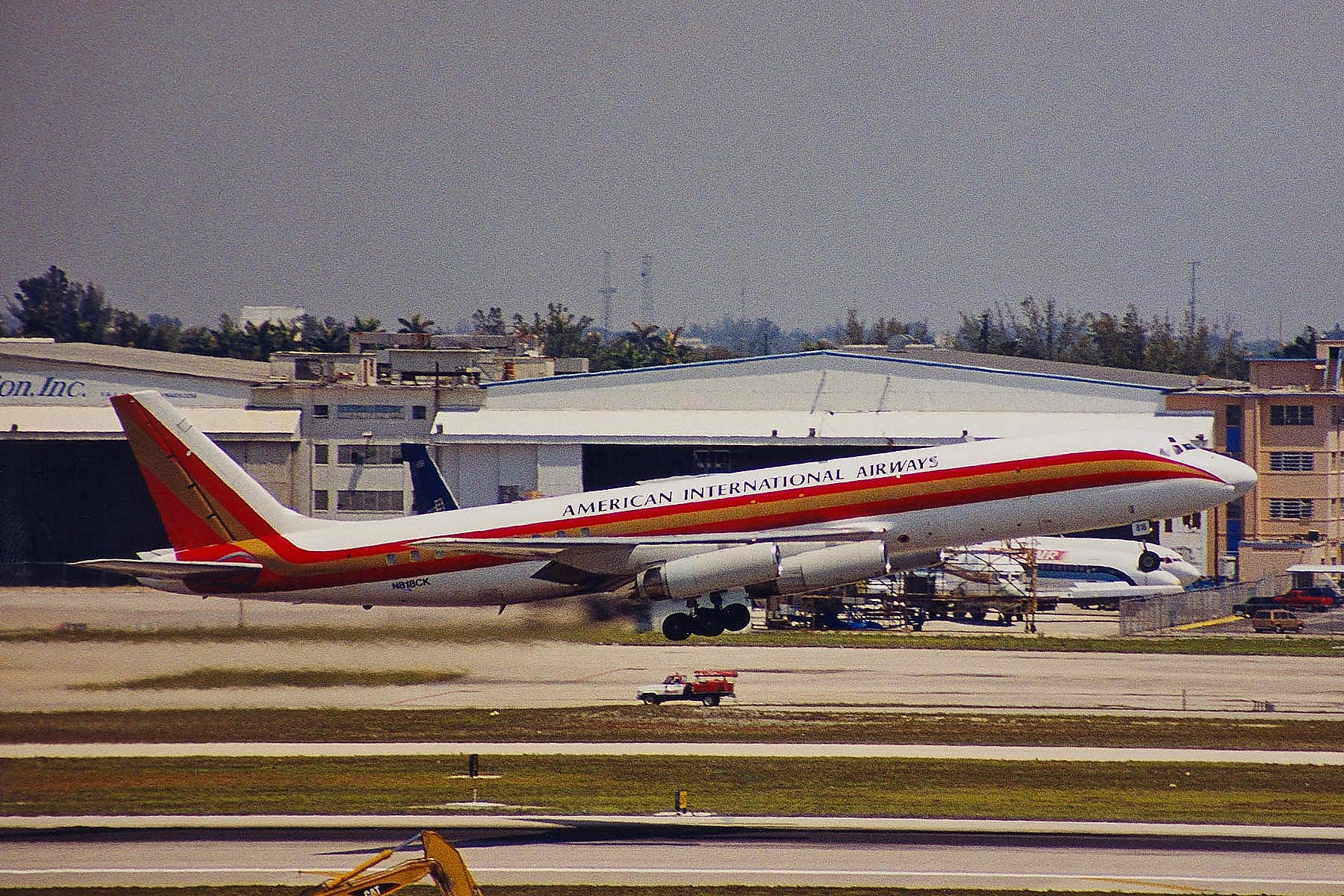
Douglas DC 8-62CF landing at Miami

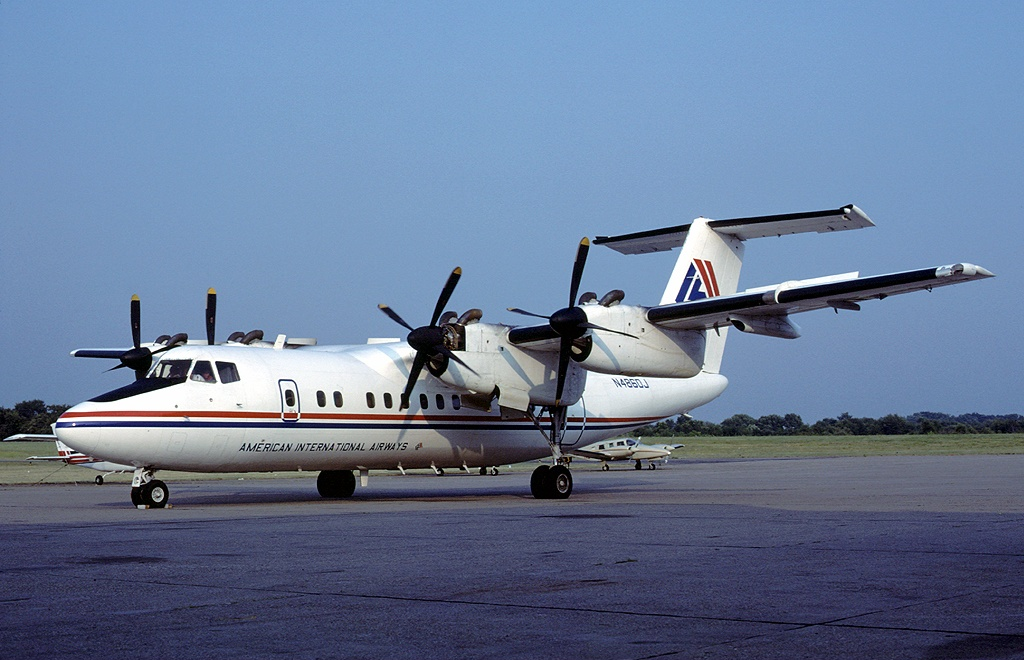
De Havilland Canada DHC 7 at Philadelphia-Northeast airport

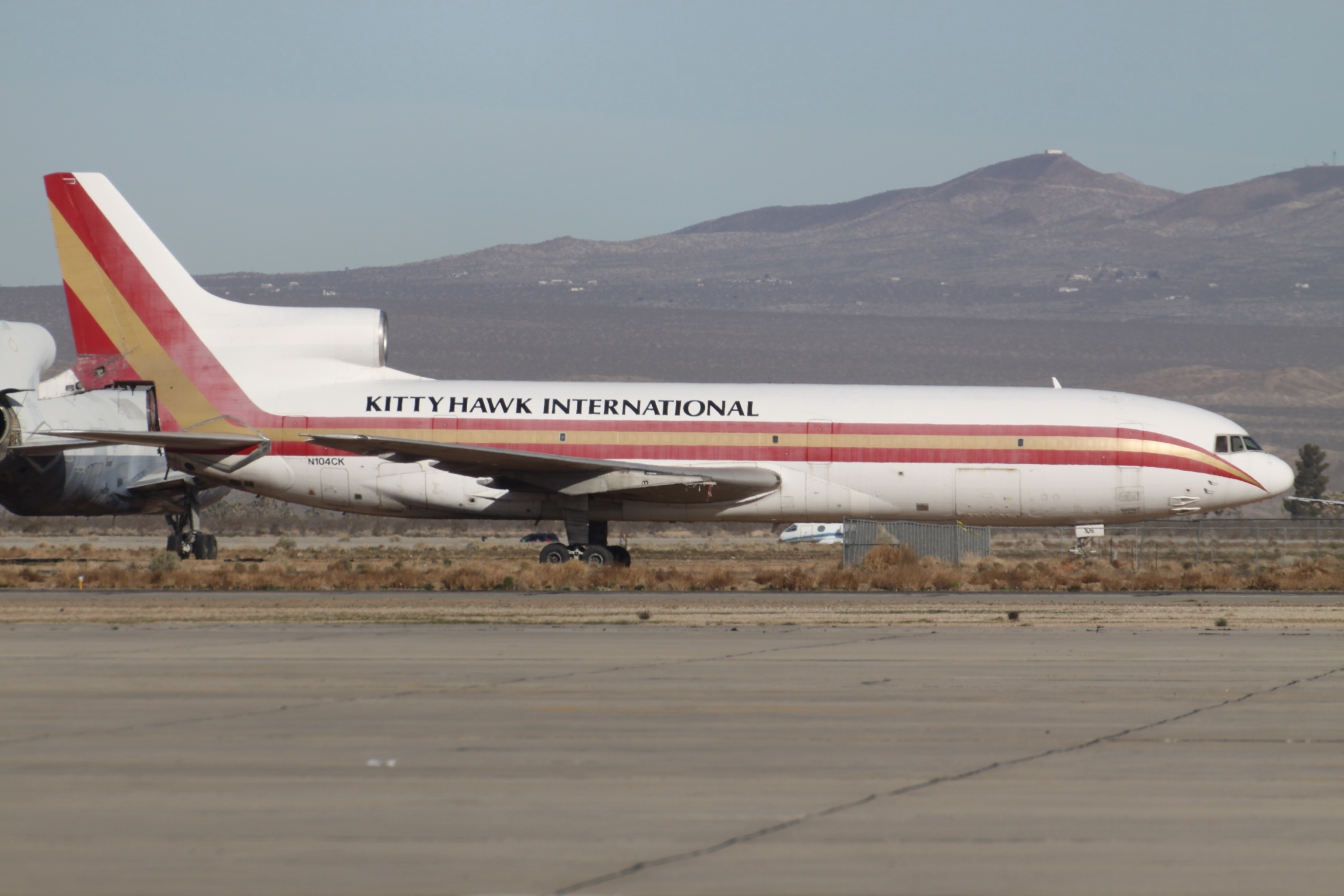
Lockheed L.1011 "Tristar"

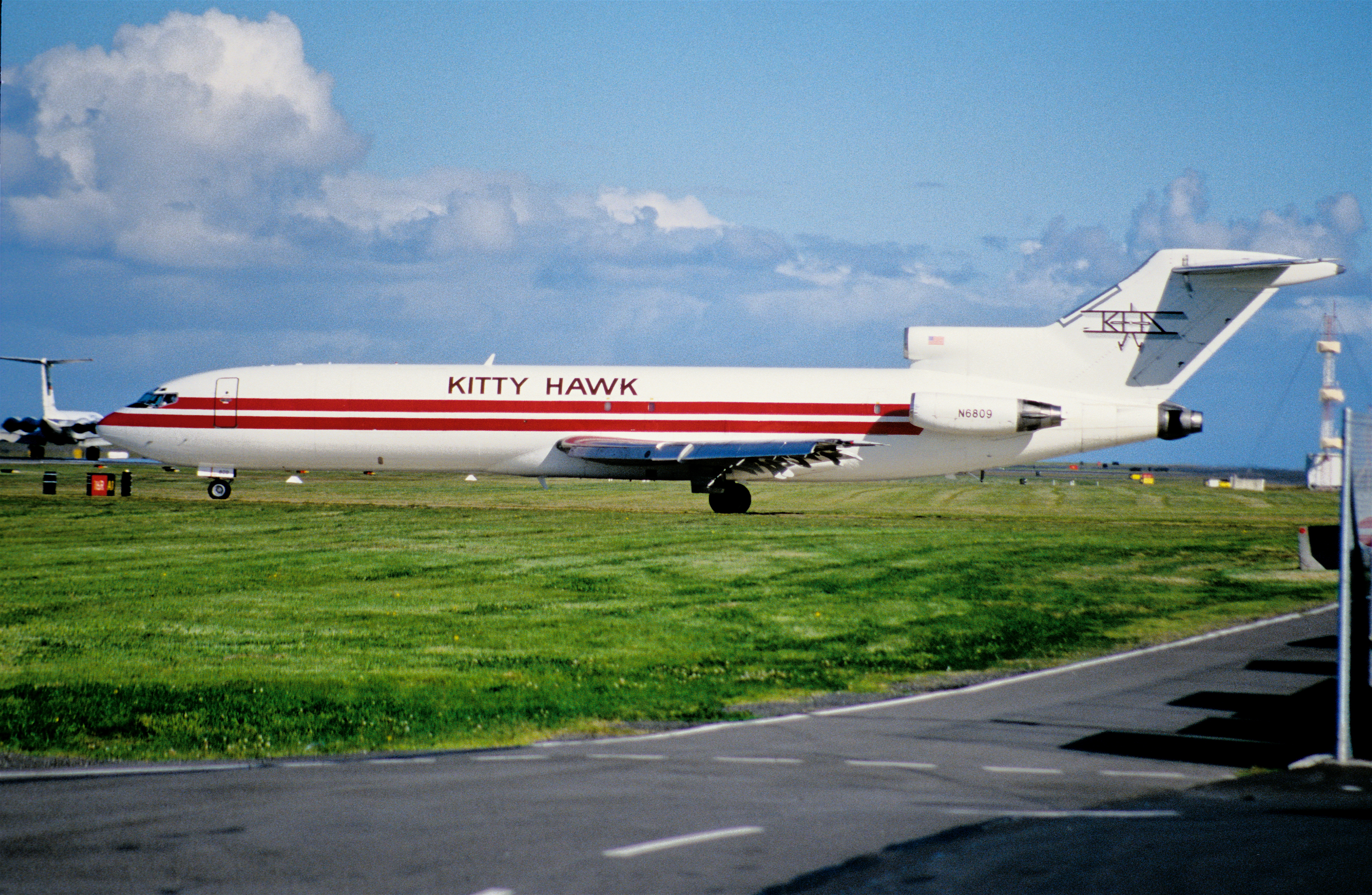
Boeing 727-223F

== Accidents and incidents ==
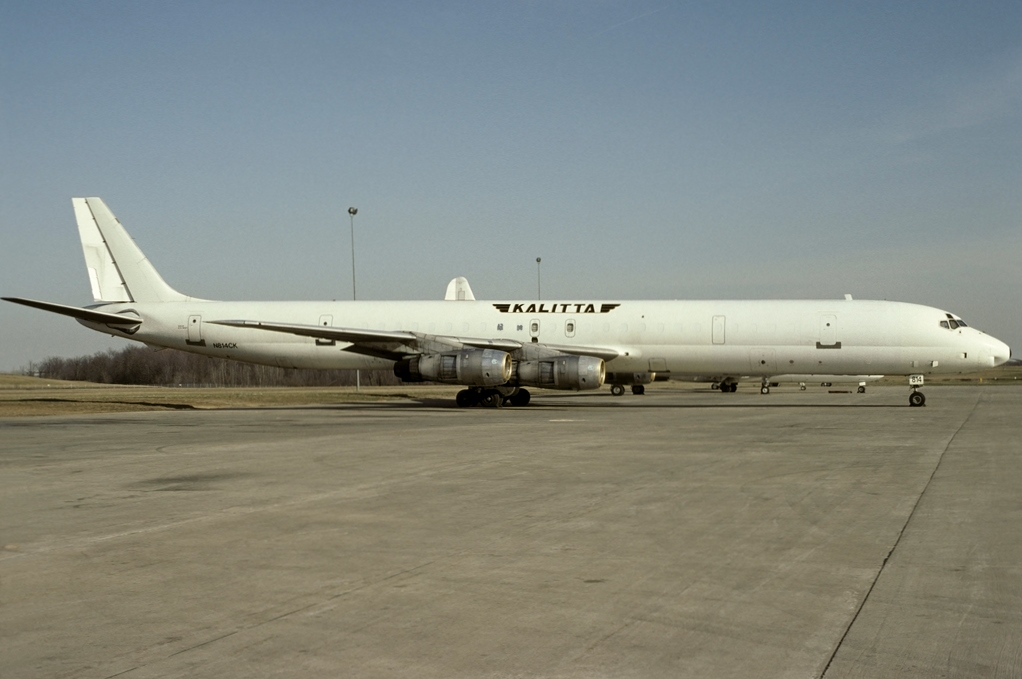
This DC 8 was involved in a non-fatal accident at Leeward Point Field.

- On August 18, 1993, American International Airways Flight 808, a Douglas DC-8-61 (N814CK) with three crew members on board struck level terrain 1,400 feet west of the approach end of the runway while landing at Guantanamo Bay, Cuba. The aircraft approached from the south and was making a right turn for runway 10 with an increasing angle of bank in order to align with the runway. At 200–300 feet AGL the wings started to rock towards wings level and the nose pitched up. The right wing appeared to stall, the aircraft rolled to a 90-degree angle of bank and the nose pitched down. All three crew members survived with serious injuries, though the aircraft was completely destroyed by the impact and post-crash fire. Probable cause of the accident was attributed primarily to the impaired judgment, decision-making, and flying abilities of the captain and flight crew due to the effects of fatigue resulting from extended flight/duty hours. This accident was also featured in the 19th season of Mayday/Air Crash Investigation in the episode titled "Borderline Tactics".
- On October 20, 2004, a Kalitta Air Boeing 747 (N709CK) with five crew members on board experienced mechanical difficulties with one of the four engines and diverted to land safely at Detroit Metropolitan Airport. No one was injured. It was discovered after landing that the number 1 engine had separated from the airplane as it climbed through 16,000 feet over Lake Michigan. The engine was later recovered for inspection.
- During the 2006 Israel-Lebanon conflict (2nd Lebanon war), Kalitta Air made weapon supply flights from the United States to Israel, via Glasgow Prestwick Airport in Scotland for refueling, without authority from the United Kingdom Civil Aviation Authority. Scotland's Crown Office considered, but eventually decided against, prosecuting Kalitta Air for two July 2006 flights carrying laser-guided bombs.
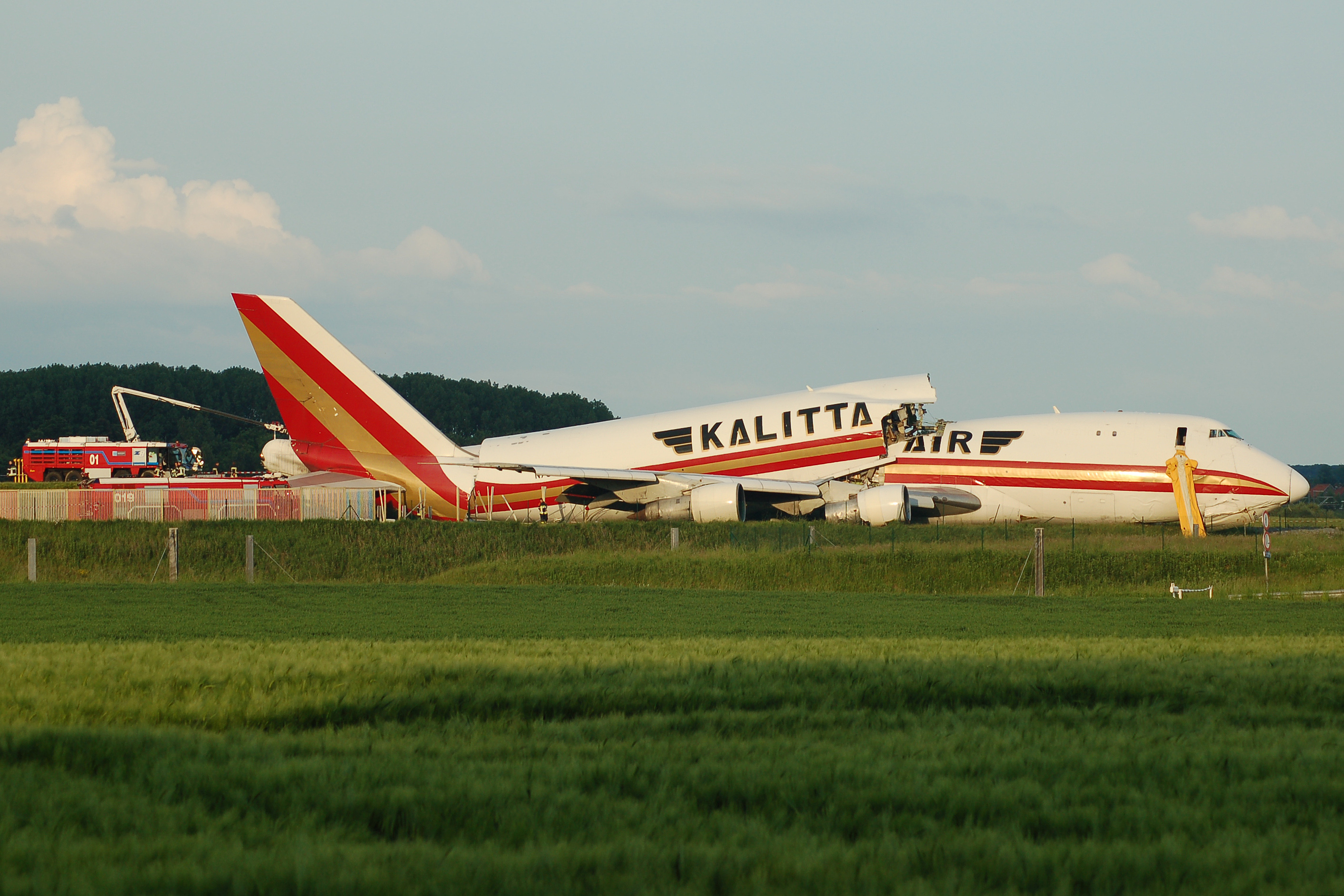
  N704CK after an incident at Brussels Airport 2008.
- On May 25, 2008, a Boeing 747-209F/SCD (N704CK), operating as Flight 207 overran runway 20 at Brussels Airport. The aircraft broke in three and came to a complete stop in a field bordering the runway. There were four crew members and one passenger on board, and no injuries were reported. The aircraft destined for Bahrain International Airport was loaded with 76 tons of goods, half of which was diplomatic mail. Belgian investigators announced that the accident was caused by the decision to reject the take-off 12 knots after passing V1 speed following a bird strike. The Air Accident Investigation Unit (AAIU) of the Federal Public Service Mobility and Transport had investigated the accident.
- On July 7, 2008, a Boeing 747-209B (N714CK), operating for Centurion Air Cargo as Flight 164 crashed shortly after departing from El Dorado International Airport in Bogotá at 3:55 a.m. The aircraft was en route to Miami, Florida, with a shipment of flowers. After reporting a fire in the number 4 engine, the crew attempted the return to the airport. However, after engine number 1 failed as well, the aircraft could not maintain altitude and crashed near the village of Madrid, Colombia. The aircraft's empennage hit a ranch house, killing a 50-year-old man and his 13-year-old son who lived there. The flight deck separated from the remainder of the aircraft, and the crew of eight survived with light to serious injuries while the rest of the airframe was consumed by fire.
- On March 29, 2019, a Boeing 747 (N740CK) departing from Brussels Airport allegedly experienced a compression failure in one of the engines at two minutes into the flight. The aircraft was diverted over the North Sea to burn fuel and landed in Leipzig.
- On September 30, 2021, a Boeing 747-400 (N741CK) operated as Flight K4330 from Leipzig (Germany) to East Midlands, EN (UK), landed on East Midlands' runway 27 when shortly after touchdown and after engaging spoilers and reverse thrust the Number 3 engine suffered a compressor stall and emitted a loud bang with flames.
- On August 7, 2023, a Kalitta Air Boeing 747-481F (N401KZ), operating from Anchorage to Ningbo, China, suffered a runway excursion upon landing at Ningbo Lishe International Airport. There were no injuries.
- On July 19, 2026, Kalitta Flight 264, a Boeing 777-300ERSF with registration N778CK was doing a go around at Cincinnati/Northern Kentucky International Airport when it suddenly had a tail strike. The plane made a safe landing on runway 36R.

== Media appearances ==
- For the 1997 film Air Force One, the producers rented one of Kalitta's Boeing 747-146 aircraft N703CK and repainted it to replicate the iconic Air Force One livery.

== See also ==
- List of airlines of the United States
- Kalitta Charters
