= Dragster =

Dragster may refer to:

- Dragster (car), a drag racing term referring to a lengthy, open-wheeled vehicle
- Dragster, styled dragSTER, an English punk rock band fronted by Fiona Friel, also singer of Conflict
- Dragster (video game), a video game released in 1980
- DRAGSTER, callsign of Kalitta Charters
- Top Thrill Dragster, a roller coaster at Cedar Point previously referred to as the Dragster
- Dragster, another name for a wheelie bike
