= Oscoda–Wurtsmith Airport =

Public airport in Oscoda, Michigan

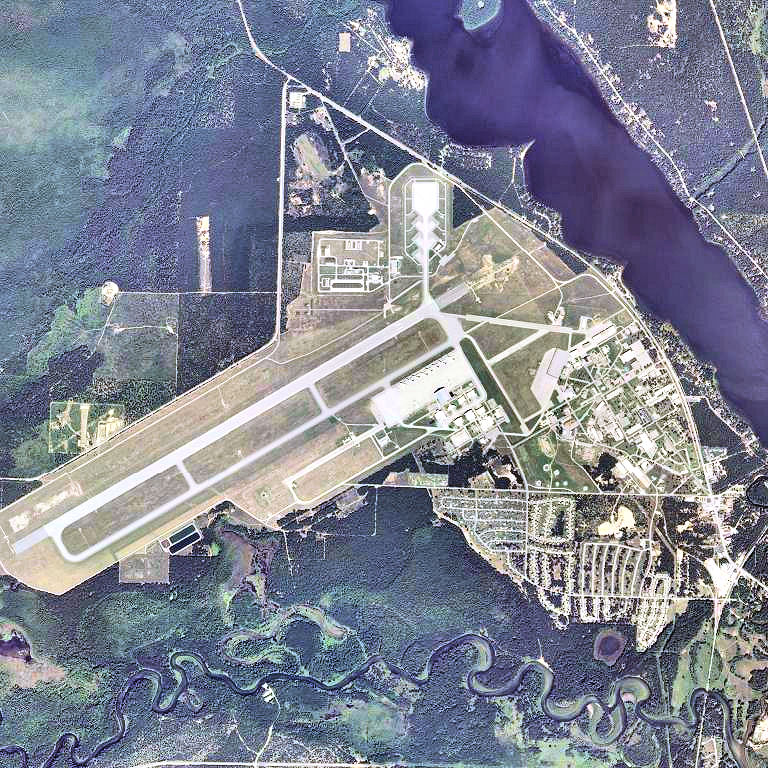
- USGS 2006 airphoto
- IATA: OSC; ICAO: KOSC; FAA LID: OSC

Summary
- Airport type: Public
- Owner: Oscoda–Wurtsmith Airport Authority
- Serves: Oscoda, Michigan
- Elevation AMSL: 634 ft (193 m)
- Coordinates: 44°27′06″N 083°23′39″W

Map
- Location of airport in Michigan OSC (the United States)

Runways
Direction	Length		Surface
Direction	ft	m	Surface
7/25	11,800	3,597	Asphalt

Statistics (2021)
- Aircraft operations: 5,668
- Based aircraft: 37
- Source: Federal Aviation Administration

Oscoda–Wurtsmith Airport (IATA: OSC, ICAO: KOSC, FAA LID: OSC) is a public use airport located three nautical miles (6 km) northwest of the central business district of Oscoda, an unincorporated community in Iosco County, Michigan, United States. It is owned by the Oscoda–Wurtsmith Airport Authority. It is included in the Federal Aviation Administration (FAA) National Plan of Integrated Airport Systems for 2017–2021, in which it is categorized as a local general aviation facility.

== History ==
It was built out of a portion of the decommissioned Wurtsmith Air Force Base which housed nuclear armed B-52 Stratofortress bombers during the Cold War as well as air refueling squadrons.

Oscoda–Wurtsmith Airport became a public airport in 1993. It is primarily a large jet airplane salvage, jet engine maintenance and light general aviation airport with no scheduled passenger or cargo services.

The Wurtsmith Base Conversion Authority terminated in 1994, when the Charter Township of Oscoda took over as the Redevelopment Authority. The Authority was organized under Michigan Public Act 206 of 1957. It has five municipal constituents; Oscoda Township, AuSable Township, Greenbush Township, Iosco County and Alcona County. The purpose of the Authority is generally to operate and maintain a public airport. The Michigan Legislature created the Wurtsmith Renaissance Zone in 1997, which exempted businesses and residents of the 5,000 acre (20 km^{2}) zone from all state and most local taxes.

It now occupies a portion of the former base and is primarily used for cargo and light general aviation activities. The airport offers 24-hour near all weather daily access. Its UNICOM frequency is 123.0 MHz.

== Facilities and aircraft ==
Oscoda–Wurtsmith Airport covers an area of 2,000 acres (810 ha) at an elevation of 634 feet (193 m) above mean sea level. It has one asphalt paved runway designated 7/25 which measures 11,800 by 200 feet (3,597 by 61 m).

The airport has a fixed-base operator that offers aviation fuel – both avgas and jet fuel – and amenities such as general maintenance, catering, courtesy transportation, a crew lounge, and more.

For the 12-month period ending December 31, 2021, the airport had 5,668 aircraft operations, an average of 109 per week. At the same time, there were 37 aircraft based on the airport: 19 jet aircraft, 17 single-engine airplanes, and 1 helicopter.

Of note is the operations of the Yankee Air Force Museum – Wurtsmith Division. It holds periodic events.

Kalitta Air has a large maintenance operation at the airport.

Other tenants at the former base include the Huron Shores Ranger Station of the U.S. Forest Service, the Oscoda Veterans Administration Clinic, Alpena Community College, Comprehensive Aviation Training, and numerous private businesses. The former military housing units have been refurbished by the Village of Oscoda, and now serve as a major population base in the Oscoda area.

The Michigan Aerospace Manufacturers Association announced that Chippewa County, Michigan will house its new command and control center. This is the third major announcement from the organization — guiding Michigan's aerospace and defense manufacturing community within the global industry. Previously, MAMA announced plans for a Oscoda, Michigan Wurtsmith Airport horizontal launch site at and a Marquette, Michigan vertical launch site.

The airport also has a hot pit for the Michigan Air National Guard to allow aircraft to restock and resupply without shutting their engines off. The Air National Guard will supply its own fuel, and the entire project will run at little to no cost to the airport. It will be a part of a larger operation involving other tops at Grayling, Traverse City, and Oscoda.

== Environmental concerns ==
On 18 January 1994, the Environmental Protection Agency proposed to add Wurtsmith Air Force Base to the National Priorities List making the base a Superfund site. Discovery of groundwater contaminated with metals, polycyclic aromatic hydrocarbons, and volatile organic compounds, including trichloroethylene, 1,1-dichloroethane, 1,1,1-trichloroethane, and vinyl chloride on the base drove the proposal. Knowledge of the contaminated soil and groundwater existed since 1977, and cleanup efforts began before the Superfund program was created. In 1999 and 2001, Soil vapor extraction systems were added to remove the volatile organic compounds from the site. Since 2004, bioventing and biosparging systems have been cleaning soil and groundwater.

Wurtsmith was proposed but never formally added to the federal Superfund program. In 2010, PFC contamination was discovered. There is a "do not eat" advisory for all non-migratory fish caught from Clark's Marsh and the lower Au Sable River south of the former base. Wurtsmith is one of 200 military installations around the world that did or still use PFC-laden Aqueous Film Forming Foam (AFFF).

== Accidents and incidents ==
- On October 11, 1988, a USAF KC-135 Stratotanker landed hard following a steep approach in crosswind conditions causing a runway excursion off the side of the runway. The aircraft broke up, causing a fire. Six crewmembers out of the 16 on board died.
- On December 11, 2013, a Piper PA-22 nosed-over and impacted runway 24 during landing at Oscoda–Wurtsmith Airport. The student pilot, who was flying solo, said his landing had a normal touchdown, but a second or two after touchdown, the right wing lifted up. He saw the airplane nose veer left and applied right rudder. The airplane started to veer more left and began to nose-over. He applied full right aileron, but the airplane continued to nose-over and impacted the runway surface. The probable cause was found to be the student pilot's loss of control during landing in gusting wind conditions.
- On September 25, 2018, a Beechcraft Super King Air operated by Kalitta Charters, impacted wooded terrain on an instrument approach 4 miles SW of OSC, impacting the ground and causing a post-crash fire. The sole occupant, the pilot, was fatally injured.

== See also ==
- List of airports in Michigan
- Oscoda, Michigan
- Wurtsmith Air Force Base
