= Kalitta Air Flight 207 =

2008 Aviation accident

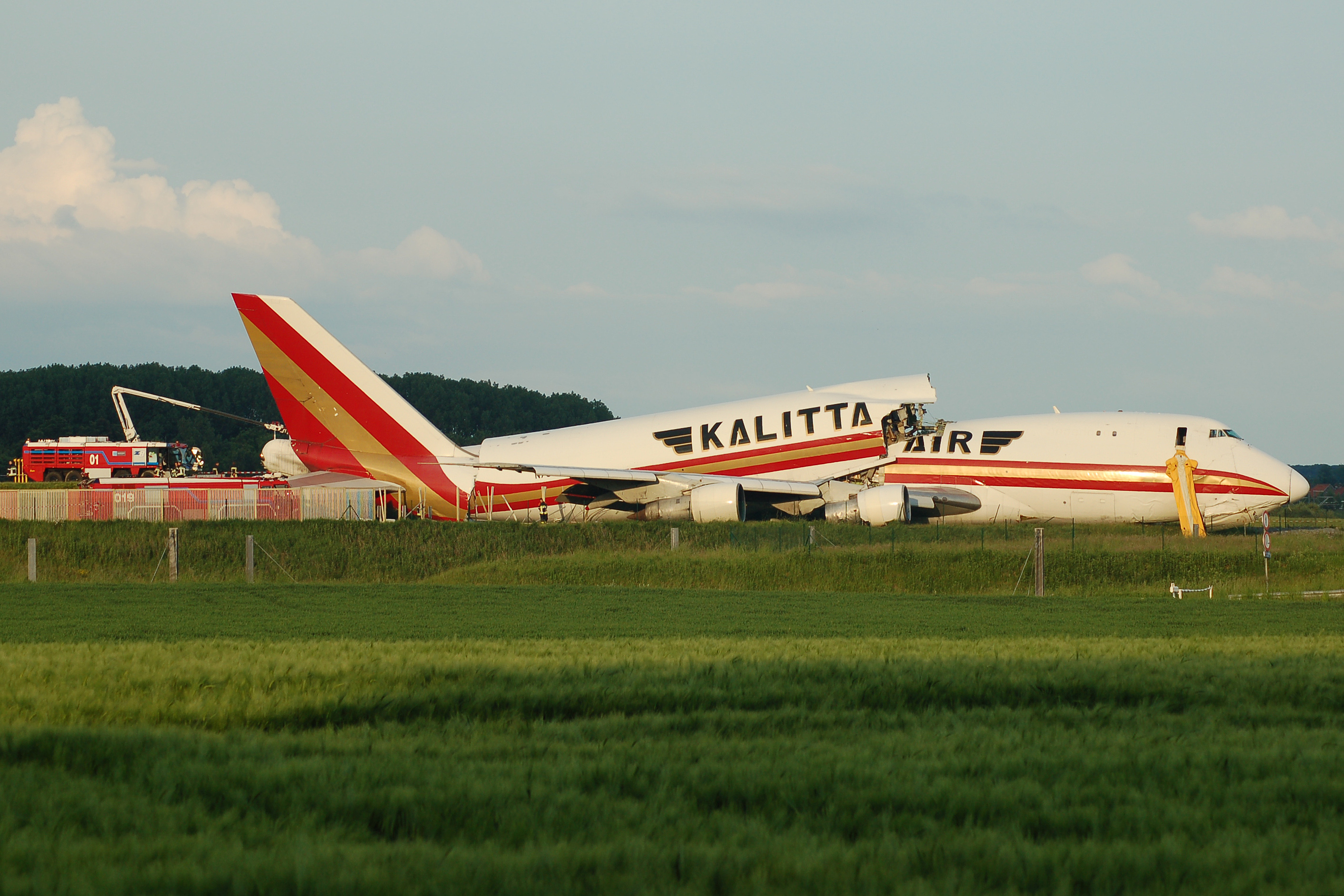
- Flight 207 after overrunning runway 19

Bird strike
- Date: May 25, 2008
- Summary: Bird strike resulting in engine failure on takeoff and runway overrun
- Site: Brussels Airport; 50°53′04.32″N 4°29′23.4″E

Aircraft
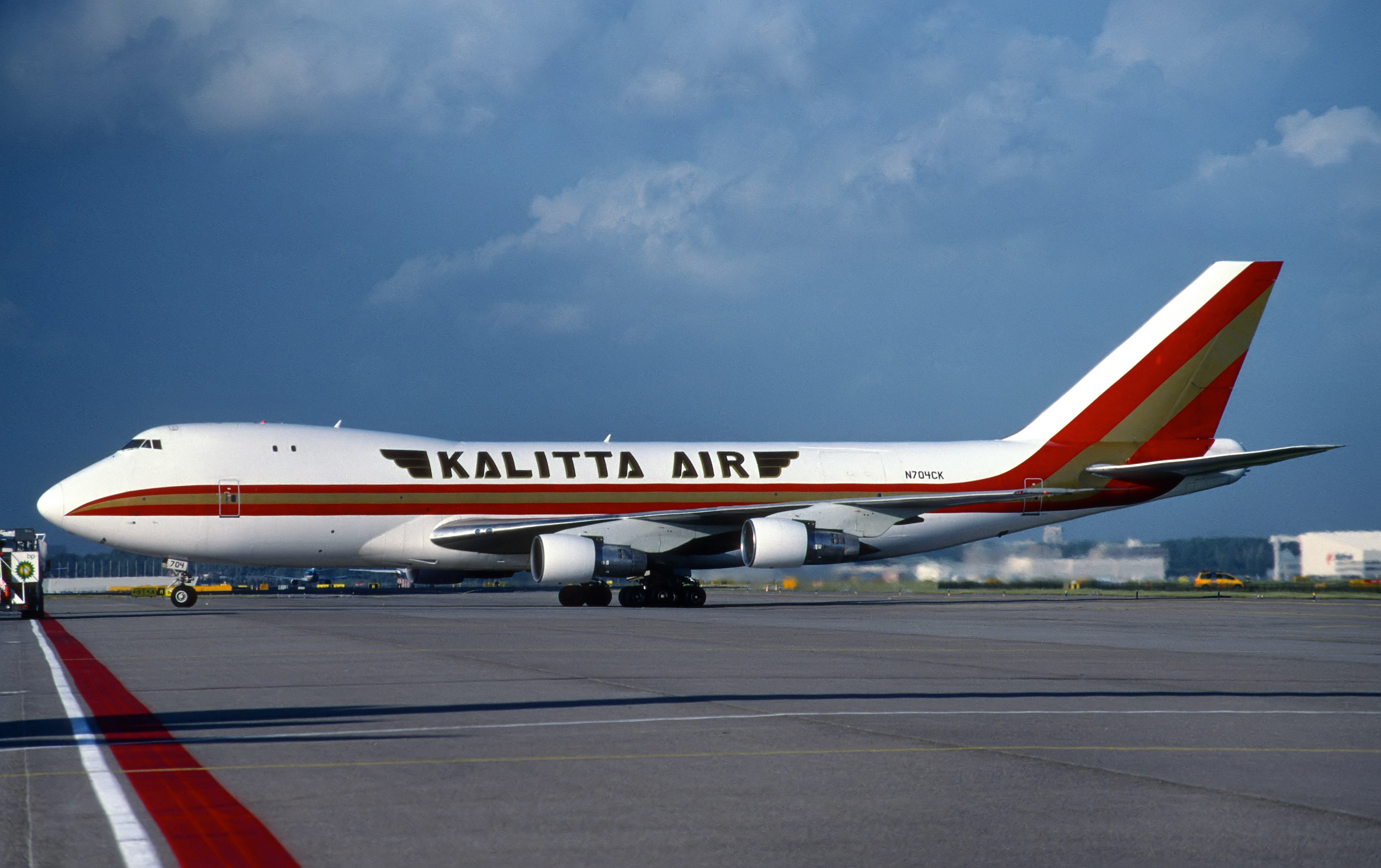
- N704CK, the aircraft involved in the accident, seen in 2004
- Aircraft type: Boeing 747-200F
- Operator: Kalitta Air
- IATA flight No.: K4207
- ICAO flight No.: CKS207
- Call sign: CONNIE 207 HEAVY
- Registration: N704CK
- Flight origin: John F. Kennedy Airport
- Stopover: Brussels Airport
- Destination: Bahrain International Airport
- Occupants: 5
- Passengers: 1
- Crew: 4
- Fatalities: 0
- Injuries: 4
- Survivors: 5

Kalitta Air Flight 207 (K4207/CKS207) was a scheduled cargo flight between John F. Kennedy Airport to Bahrain International Airport with a technical stopover at Brussels. On May 25, 2008, the Boeing 747-200 suffered a bird strike and overran runway 20 (later renumbered to 19) during takeoff at Brussels Airport. This led the aircraft to split into three large pieces. The occupants sustained minor injuries.

== Aircraft and crew ==
The aircraft was a 27-year-old Boeing 747-209F registered as N704CK. It was built in July 1980 for China Airlines with the registration B-1894. It was re-registered as B-18752, operating for the same airline until the end of August 2003. It was purchased by Kalitta Air in September of the same year and registered as N704CK. The aircraft had logged 108,560 flight hours in 20,599 flight cycles. It was also equipped with Pratt & Whitney JT9D-7Q engines with serial numbers (from leftmost engine to rightmost engine) 702399, 702394, 702119 and 702082. Engine No.3 was once reported to be in flames in April 2008. It was replaced and the damage sustained to the aircraft was repaired. There were 4 crew members and 1 passenger on board. The captain was 59 years old and was a qualified captain on the Boeing 747, 757, and 767 and the McDonnell Douglas DC-8. He had accumulated 15,000 flight hours throughout his career, including 3,000 flight hours logged on the Boeing 747. The first officer was 48 years old and was a qualified first officer on the Boeing 747, Gulfstream G500, Canadair CL-65, and Saab 340. He had accumulated 7,000 flight hours, including 200 flight hours logged on the Boeing 747. The flight engineer was 53 years old and was a qualified flight engineer. He had accumulated 7,000 flight hours throughout his career, including 1,950 flight hours logged on the Boeing 747. The aircraft carried 76 tonnes of cargo.

== Flight ==
At 11:06 a.m., Flight CKS207 requested pushback. They requested clearance to taxi at 11:13 a.m. The controller directed the crew to taxi to A7 and hold short of runway 25R. They were later asked to contact the tower controller. The crew elected not to use runway 25R and instead requested to taxi to runway 20, as that runway was used for takeoffs whereas 25R was used for landings. They were asked to line up behind a Korean Air Boeing 747 and wait for takeoff clearance. At 11:29 a.m., they were cleared for takeoff from runway 20. At approximately 11:30 a.m., the crew heard a loud bang, followed by an explosion on Engine No.3. They decided to cancel the takeoff by engaging the thrust-reversers and setting the engine power to idle. The thrust reversers did not engage and since they had crossed V_{1} speed (138 knots (256 km/h; 159 mph)) by 12 knots (22 km/h; 14 mph), they could not stop in time and overran the runway. A witness later reported hearing a "slight knock" and noticed a plane charging towards him, after which he immediately ran for cover. Flight 207 stopped 300 metres (980 ft) from the end of runway 20 and 100 metres (330 ft) from a railroad just ahead. The aircraft broke into three main pieces: the cockpit, the fuselage and the tail. The tower immediately called for fire trucks to arrive at the scene. The firefighters coated the wings with fire retardant as the plane was filled with fuel; the aircraft did not catch fire.

== Investigation ==
The investigation authority arrived at the crash site an hour later. The accident was investigated by the Aircraft Accident Investigation Belgium. It was determined that there were traces of the European kestrel inside engine 3 causing it to lose power and fail, which was accompanied by a loud bang and it was noticed by the crew with immediate actions to slow down the plane. The runway end safety area (RESA), a part of the runway which helps the aircraft to stop in time, of runway 20 met the ICAO requirements in length and width—each 90 metres (300 ft). However, ICAO recommended a RESA length of 240 metres (790 ft); the runway did not follow this recommendation because there were a railway ahead of the runway and a road at the other end. The bird strike also caused the thrust reversers to not engage, thereby not adequately slowing down the aircraft. The bird strike, the malfunctioning of the thrust reverser, and the lack of situational awareness contributed to the crash of Flight 207.

== Aftermath ==
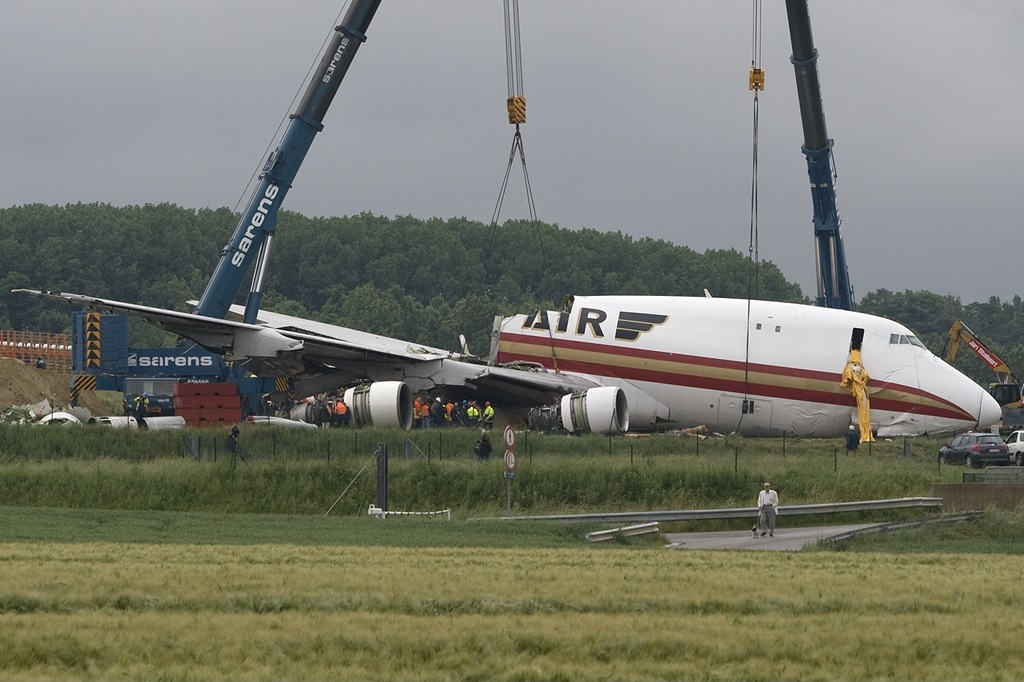
N704CK during clean up operations.

The crew had minor injuries. The training for rejecting a takeoff after V_{1} for Kalitta Air was modified: A training DVD depicted the same runway as the accident flight in Brussels. The RESA length requirement was made stricter. The Bird Control Unit (BCU) was also reinforced to be more accurate and subsequent training for its use was also provided in the DVD. The use of the full length of runway 20 was never published in the Aeronautical Information Publication (AIP). It was only exclusive to runway 25R. A dedicated sentence has also now been provided for runway 20.

== See also ==
- Jeju Air Flight 2216, another runway overrun following a bird strike.
- US Airways Flight 1549, another flight accompanied by a birdstrike during takeoff.
- Ryanair Flight 4102, another birdstrike incident in 2008.
- Fine Air Flight 101
- Emery Worldwide Airlines Flight 17
- Centurion Air Cargo Flight 164
