= Cielos Airlines =

Cargo airline based in Peru

IATA	ICAO	Call sign
A2	CIU	CIELOS
- Founded: November 30, 1997
- Commenced operations: June 30, 1998
- Ceased operations: June 30, 2012
- Hubs: Jorge Chávez International Airport; Miami International Airport
- Alliance: Centurion Air Cargo; Master Top Airlines
- Fleet size: 7
- Destinations: 22
- Parent company: AMC (Alliance Management Center)
- Headquarters: Callao, Peru
- Key people: Orestes Romero (CEO); Tony D'Silva (sales director)
- Website: www.cielos-airlines.com

Cielos Airlines, commonly known by its old name Cielos del Peru S.A., was a cargo airline based in Callao, Peru. It operated scheduled, ad hoc and contract charter domestic and international cargo services. Its main base was Jorge Chávez International Airport. The company slogan was Spanish: para ayudarlo a llegar lejos, To help you get far.

== History ==
The airline was established in 1997 and started operations in 1998 with a Boeing 707. On January 31, 1998, Export Air was merged into the company after Cielos acquired its outstanding stock. It was owned by Alfonso Conrado Rey (70%), Francisco Berniwson (15%) and Manuel Eduardo Francesqui Navarro (15%). The fleet grew to a total of 8 aircraft at the end of 2006.

== Destinations ==
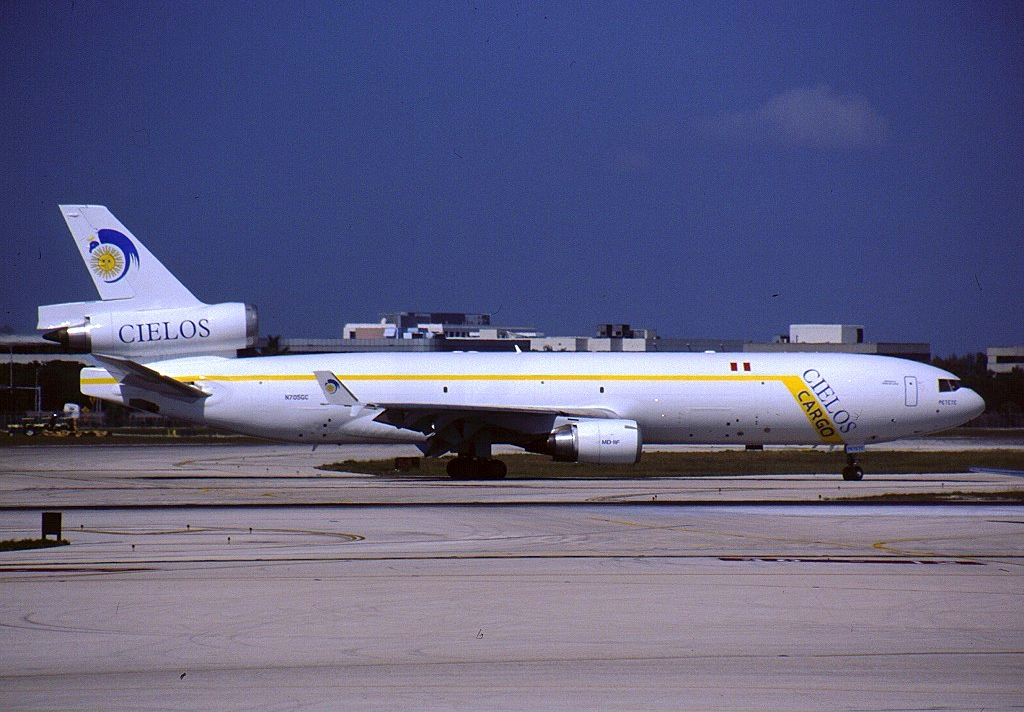
A Cielos del Perú McDonnell Douglas MD-11F taxiing at Miami International Airport in 2001

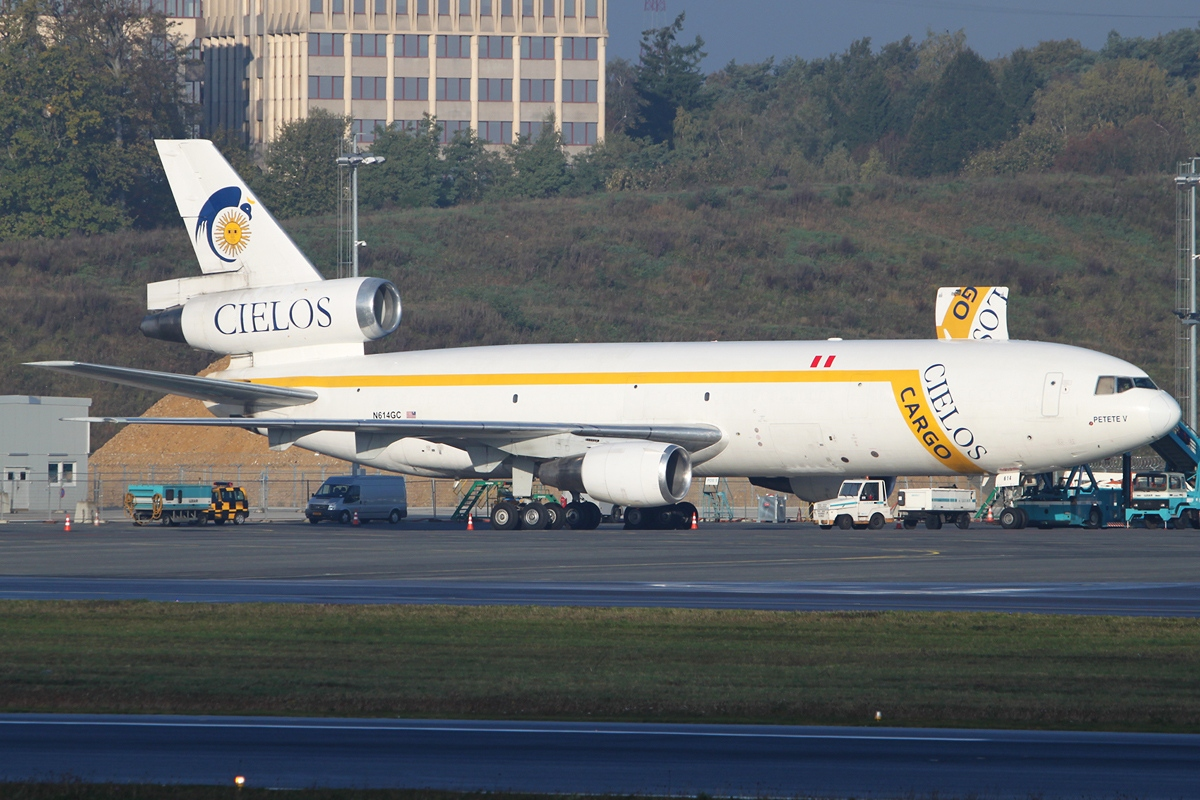
A Cielos del Perú McDonnell Douglas DC-10-30F at Luxembourg Airport in 2010

Cielos Airlines operated freight services to the following international scheduled destinations (as of June 2006):

- Argentina
  - Buenos Aires (Ministro Pistarini International Airport)
  - San Miguel de Tucumán (Teniente Benjamín Matienzo International Airport)
- Brazil
  - Campinas (Viracopos International Airport)
  - Manaus (Eduardo Gomes International Airport)
  - São Paulo (Guarulhos International Airport)
- Chile
  - Santiago (Arturo Merino Benítez International Airport)
- Colombia
  - Barranquilla (Ernesto Cortissoz International Airport)
  - Bogotá (El Dorado International Airport)
  - Cali (Alfonso Bonilla Aragón International Airport)
  - Medellín (José María Córdova International Airport)
- Dominican Republic
  - Santo Domingo (Las Américas International Airport)
- Ecuador
  - Guayaquil (José Joaquín de Olmedo International Airport)
  - Quito (Old Mariscal Sucre International Airport)
- Guatemala
  - Guatemala City (La Aurora International Airport)
- Mexico
  - Guadalajara (Don Miguel Hidalgo y Costilla International Airport)
  - Mexico City (Mexico City International Airport)
- Panama
  - Panama City (Tocumen International Airport)
- Peru
  - Lima (Jorge Chávez International Airport) Hub
- United States
  - Los Angeles (Los Angeles International Airport)
  - Miami (Miami International Airport) Hub
  - New York City (John F. Kennedy International Airport)
- Uruguay
  - Montevideo (Carrasco International Airport)
- Venezuela
  - Caracas (Simón Bolívar International Airport)
  - Valencia (Arturo Michelena International Airport)

== Fleet ==
The Cielos Airlines fleet included the following aircraft (at March 2012, three months prior to closure):

Cielos Airlines fleet
Aircraft	In service	Notes
McDonnell Douglas DC-10-30F	7	
Total	7	

=== Retired fleet ===
Before closing, the airline previously operated the following aircraft:

Cielos Airlines retired fleet
Aircraft	Total	Introduced	Retired	Notes
Boeing 707-320C	3	1998	2004	
McDonnell Douglas DC-10-10F	1	2005	2006	Leased from Emery Worldwide
McDonnell Douglas DC-10-30CF	2	2000	2006	
McDonnell Douglas MD-11F	1	2001	2001	Leased from Gemini Air Cargo

The aircraft of Cielos' fleet were christened Petete, Petete II, Petete III, etc. The aircraft were named after (the nickname of) the airline owner's son, with Petete meaning pacifier in the owner's local language.

== Accidents and incidents ==
- On July 6, 2003, a McDonnell Douglas DC-10-30CF (registered OB-1749) skidded off Runway 33 of Alfonso Bonilla Aragón International Airport on landing, and came to rest 300 meters past the end of the runway. The aircraft sustained damage to engine no. 1 and main landing gear after colliding with ILS antennas. All 4 occupants on board survived. The aircraft was repaired and returned to service.
