= Ryanair Flight 4102 =

Aviation accident in 2008

Coordinates: 41.7928°N 12.5992°E

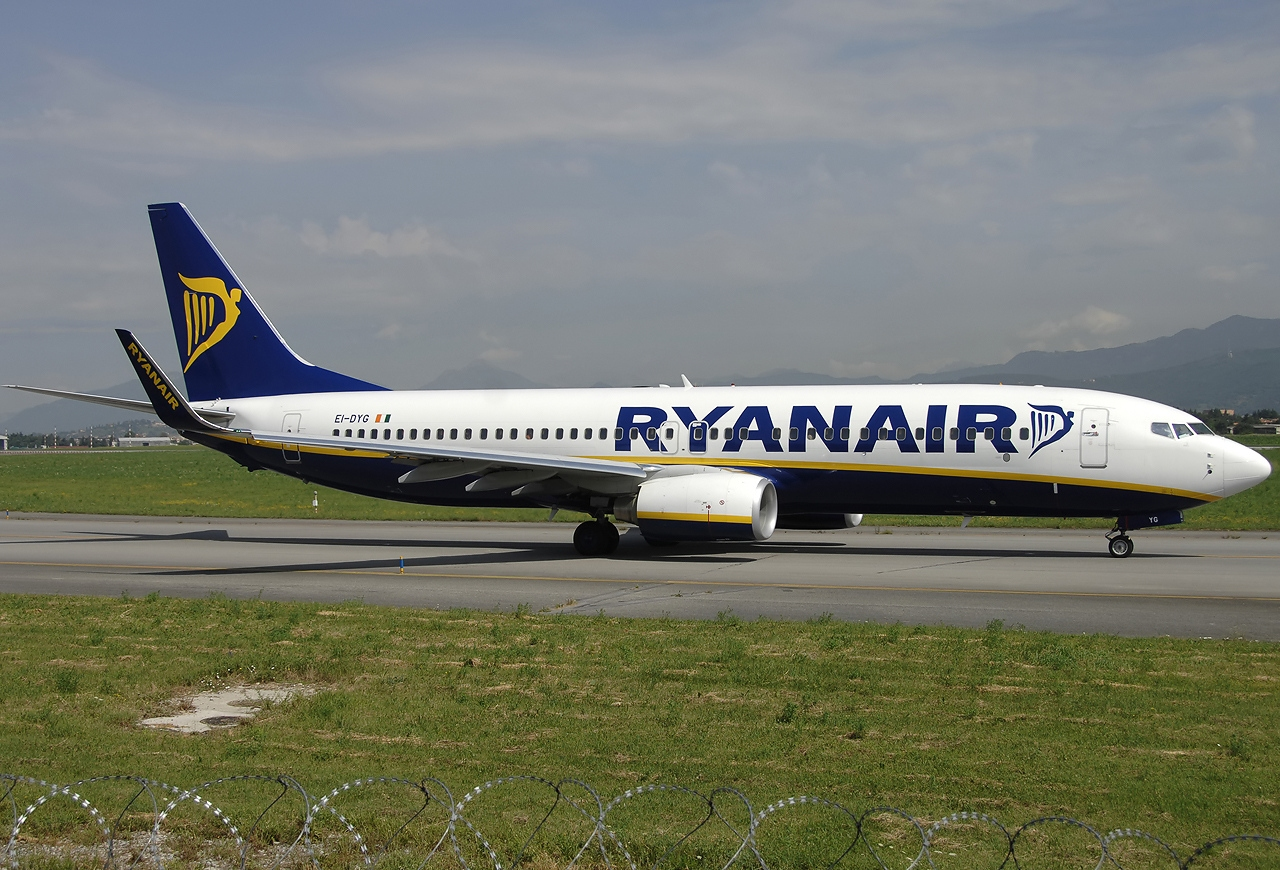
- EI-DYG, the aircraft involved in the accident at Orio al Serio International Airport in July 2008

Accident
- Date: 10 November 2008
- Summary: Bird strike leading to dual engine failure during landing
- Site: Rome Ciampino Airport, Rome, Italy

Aircraft
- Aircraft type: Boeing 737-8AS
- Operator: Ryanair
- IATA flight No.: FR4102
- ICAO flight No.: RYR4102
- Call sign: RYANAIR 4102
- Registration: EI-DYG
- Flight origin: Frankfurt–Hahn Airport, Hahn, Rhineland-Palatinate, Germany
- Destination: Rome Ciampino Airport, Rome, Italy
- Occupants: 172
- Passengers: 166
- Crew: 6
- Fatalities: 0
- Injuries: 10
- Survivors: 172

On 10 November 2008, Ryanair Flight 4102 from Frankfurt–Hahn Airport, in Hahn, Rhineland-Palatinate to Rome Ciampino Airport, in Rome, Italy, suffered multiple bird strikes while landing. Of the 172 people on board, two crew and eight passengers received hospital treatment for minor injuries. The 8-month-old Boeing 737-800 jet used for the flight sustained a massive amount of damage, which led to it being written off. This accident was the fourth hull loss of a Boeing 737-800 and the only hull loss of a plane operated by Ryanair.

== Aircraft and crew ==
The aircraft involved was a Boeing 737-8AS, equipped with two CFM International CFM56-7B26/3 engines, manufactured by Boeing Commercial Airplanes in 2008, with MSN 33639 and registered as EI-DYG. It had logged 2,419 airframe hours and 1,498 takeoff and landing cycles.

Flight 4102 was commanded by 44-year-old Belgian pilot Frédéric Colson, who had 10,000 flight hours, 6,000 of them on the Boeing 737; and his 23-year-old Dutch co-pilot First Officer Alexander Vet, who had 600 flight hours, 400 of them on the 737.

== Accident ==
On the final approach to Rome Ciampino Airport, the jet struck up to 90 starlings, which damaged the port (left) side landing gear and both engines. The flight attempted to execute a missed approach after one engine was damaged, but the remaining engine ingested birds as well and was damaged during this maneuver. After landing, due to the collapsed port-side landing gear, the aircraft veered off of runway 15 for a short time, before the flight crew maneuvered it back onto the runway surface, where it came to a rest.

The final report of the accident, investigated by the National Agency for the Safety of Flight (Italian: Agenzia Nazionale per la Sicurezza del Volo; ANSV) was released on 20 December 2018, more than 10 years after the accident.

== Aftermath ==
The airport was closed for 36 hours and all traffic was diverted to Rome Fiumicino Airport due to the jet being stranded on the runway after the port side landing gear collapsed.

The accident caused substantial damage to the aircraft, leading to it being written off. Ryanair retained ownership of it for certain parts and for training purposes.

== See also ==
- US Airways Flight 1549 – another flight that suffered a dual engine failure due to bird strikes which occurred two months later in New York City, involving an Airbus A320.
- Kalitta Air Flight 207 – a flight accompanied five months earlier which overran the runway following a bird strike during take-off.
- Jeju Air Flight 2216 – a South Korean 737, previously operated by Ryanair, that crashed following a bird strike.
