= Centurion Air Cargo =

American cargo airline

IATA	ICAO	Call sign
WE	CWC	CHALLENGE CARGO
- Founded: 1985; 41 years ago
- Ceased operations: June 2018; 8 years ago
- Hubs: Miami
- Secondary hubs: Bogotá; Medellín–JMC; Amsterdam; Buenos Aires-Ezeiza; Lima; Santiago
- Alliance: Sky Lease Cargo
- Fleet size: 8
- Destinations: 22
- Parent company: Alliance Management Center
- Headquarters: Miami-Dade County, Florida
- Key people: Alfonso Conrado Rey (chairman); Nestor Bringas (CCO)
- Employees: 1000+
- Website: www.centurioncargo.com

Centurion Air Cargo, operating as Centurion Cargo, was an American cargo airline based in Miami-Dade County, Florida, United States.

== History ==
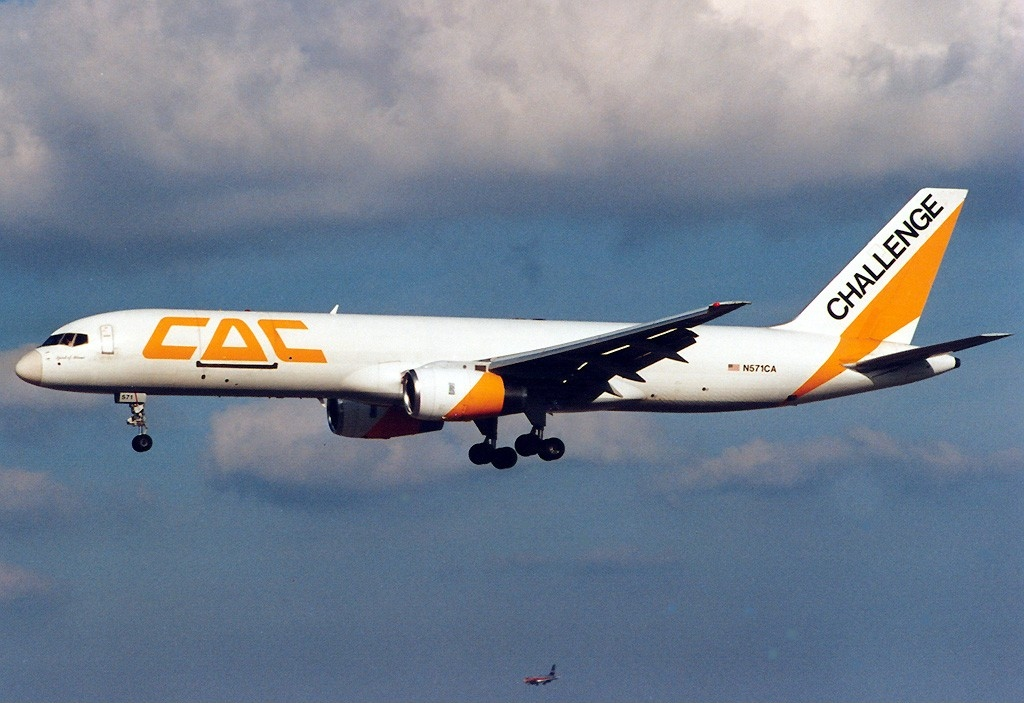
A Challenge Air Cargo Boeing 757-200PF on approach to Miami International Airport in 1992

The airline was established as Challenge Air Cargo in 1985 as a subsidiary of Challenge Air Transport. In 1986, the airline became independent of Challenge Air Transport. In 2001, following the takeover of the scheduled business by United Parcel Service a new company was formed as Centurion Air Cargo to take over the air operating certificate of Challenge.

The airline surrendered its operating certificate to the Federal Aviation Administration in June 2018, after being unable to restructure its operations after financial difficulties.

== Centurion Cargo Center ==
The Centurion Cargo Center was a cargo terminal located at Miami International Airport, opened in 2013.

The facility comprised a 1,400,000 square feet (130,000 m^{2}) area incorporating a 550,000 square feet (51,000 m^{2}) warehouse with both cold and dry storage facilities.

Centurion Cargo Center was the largest privately owned, all cargo airline facility in North America before its operation was shut down.

== Destinations ==
Centurion Air Cargo operated to the following destinations:

Country	City	Airport	Notes	Refs
Argentina	Buenos Aires	Ministro Pistarini International Airport	Hub	
Argentina	Tucumán	Teniente General Benjamín Matienzo International Airport		
Brazil	Manaus	Eduardo Gomes International Airport		
Brazil	Rio de Janeiro	Rio de Janeiro/Galeão International Airport		
Brazil	Viracopos	Viracopos International Airport		
Chile	Santiago	Arturo Merino Benítez International Airport	Hub	
Colombia	Bogotá	El Dorado International Airport	Hub	
Colombia	Medellín	José María Córdova International Airport	Hub	
Ecuador	Latacunga	Cotopaxi International Airport		
Hong Kong	Hong Kong	Hong Kong International Airport		
Japan	Tokyo	Narita International Airport		
Mexico	Guadalajara	Miguel Hidalgo y Costilla Guadalajara International Airport		
Mexico	Mexico City	Mexico City International Airport		
Netherlands	Amsterdam	Amsterdam Airport Schiphol	Hub	
Panama	Panama City	Tocumen International Airport		
Paraguay	Ciudad del Este	Guaraní International Airport		
Peru	Lima	Jorge Chávez International Airport	Hub	
United States	Los Angeles	Los Angeles International Airport		
United States	Houston	George Bush Intercontinental Airport		
United States	Miami	Miami International Airport	Hub	
Uruguay	Montevideo	Carrasco International Airport		
Venezuela	Caracas	Simón Bolívar International Airport		

== Fleet ==
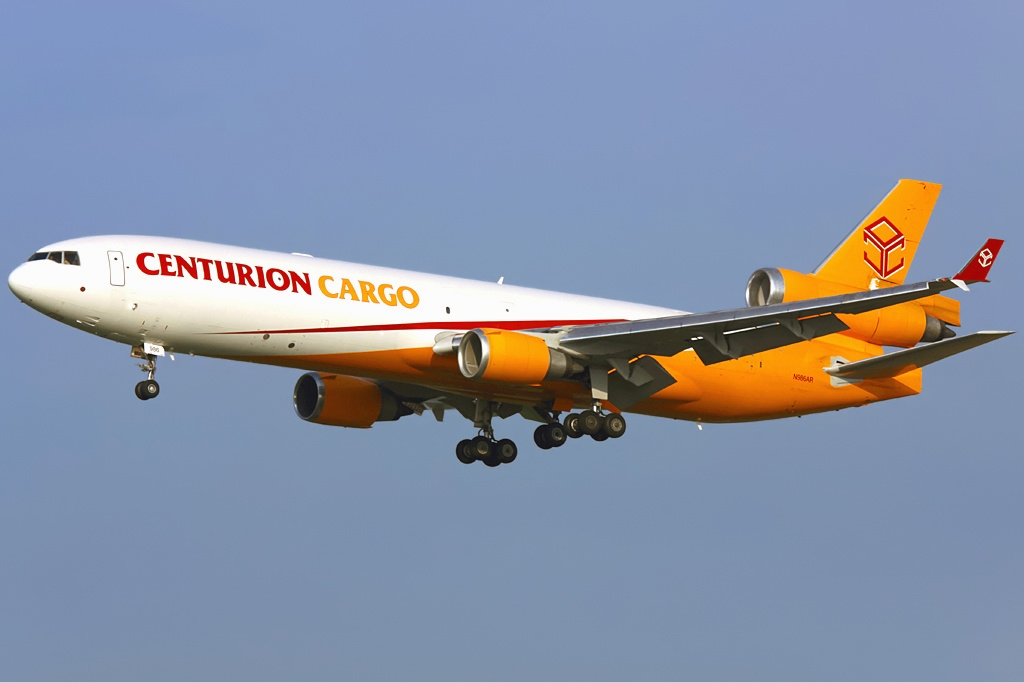
A Centurion Air Cargo McDonnell Douglas MD-11F landing at Amsterdam Airport Schiphol in 2011

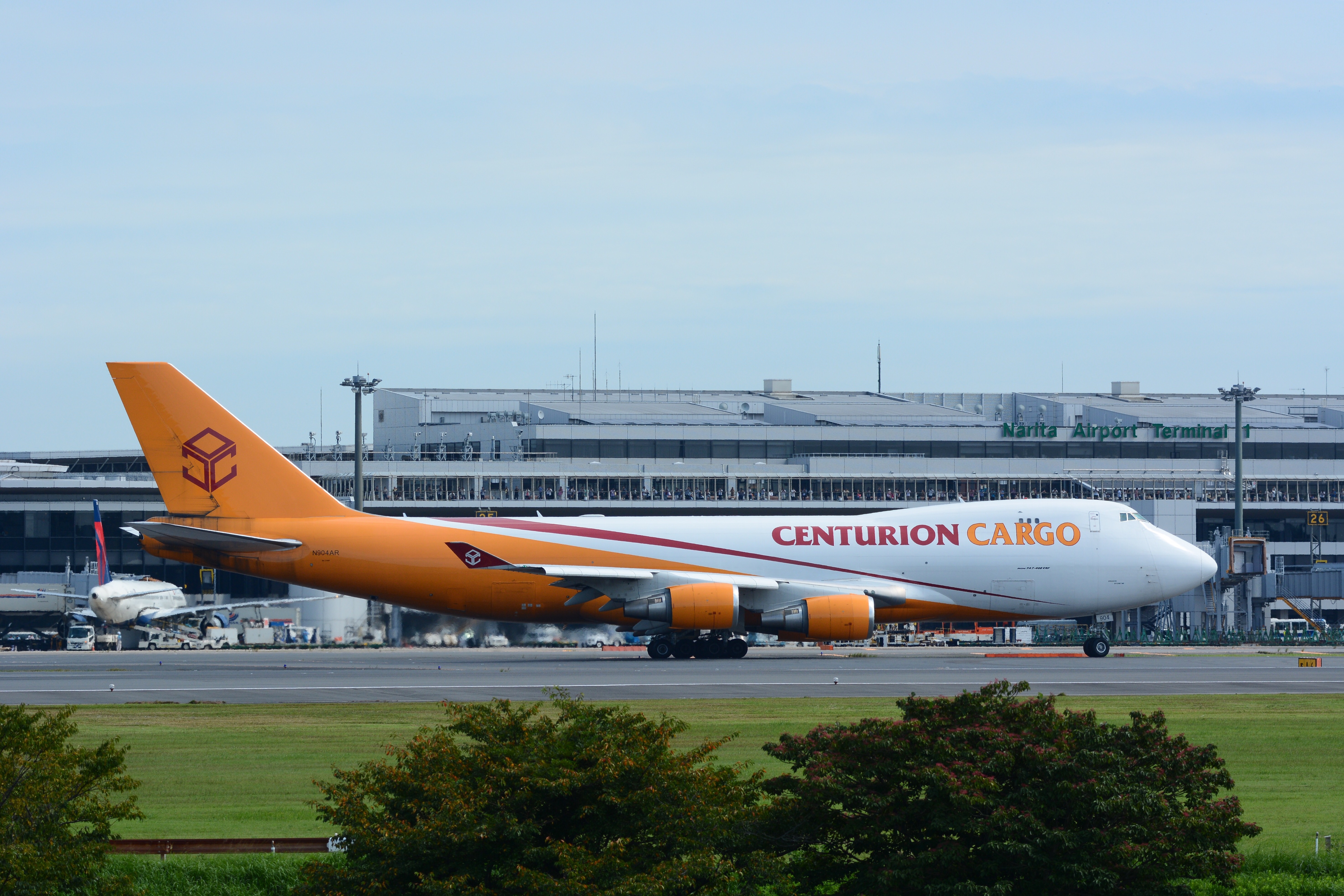
A Centurion Air Cargo Boeing 747-400ERF taxiing at Narita International Airport in 2015

The airline fleet previously included the following aircraft:

Centurion Air Cargo fleet
Aircraft	Total	Introduced	Retired	Notes
BAC One-Eleven Series 400AK	1	1986	1986	
Boeing 707-320C	3	1983	1999	
Boeing 727-100	1	1986	1987	Leased from Air Panamá Internacional
Boeing 747-400BDSF	1	2015	2017	
Boeing 747-400ERF	2	2013	2017	
Boeing 747-400F	1	2013	2015	
Boeing 757-200PF	3	1989	2000	
Douglas DC-8-63PF	2	1988	1991	
Douglas DC-8-73CF	1	1995	1995	Leased from Southern Air Transport
McDonnell Douglas DC-10-10F	1	2006	2007	Leased from Emery Worldwide
McDonnell Douglas DC-10-30F	7	2001	2010	
McDonnell Douglas DC-10-40F	3	1998	2004	
McDonnell Douglas MD-11CF	2	2009	2017	
McDonnell Douglas MD-11F	3	2009	2018	

== Accidents and incidents ==
- On July 7, 2008, Centurion Air Cargo Flight 164 crashed near El Dorado International Airport in Bogota, Colombia, killing two people in a nearby house.
- On October 20, 2009, Centurion Air Cargo Flight 431, a McDonnell Douglas MD-11F (registered N701GC) sustained damage on landing at Carrasco International Airport. The right hand main landing gear leg was bent sideways during landing on runway 24. The crew managed to stop on taxiway A where the airplane had to be offloaded.
- On October 13, 2012, Centurion Air Cargo Flight 425, a McDonnell Douglas MD-11F (registered N988AR) sustained substantial damage while landing at Viracopos International Airport. Upon touchdown, the left landing gear collapsed and the aircraft skidded along the runway for 800 meters (2,600 ft) before stopping. The aircraft was written off afterwards. All 3 occupants on board were uninjured.

== See also ==
- Cielos Airlines
- List of defunct airlines of the United States
- Sky Lease Cargo
