= Centurion Air Cargo Flight 164 =

2008 aviation accident

Coordinates: 4°43′14″N 74°15′9″W

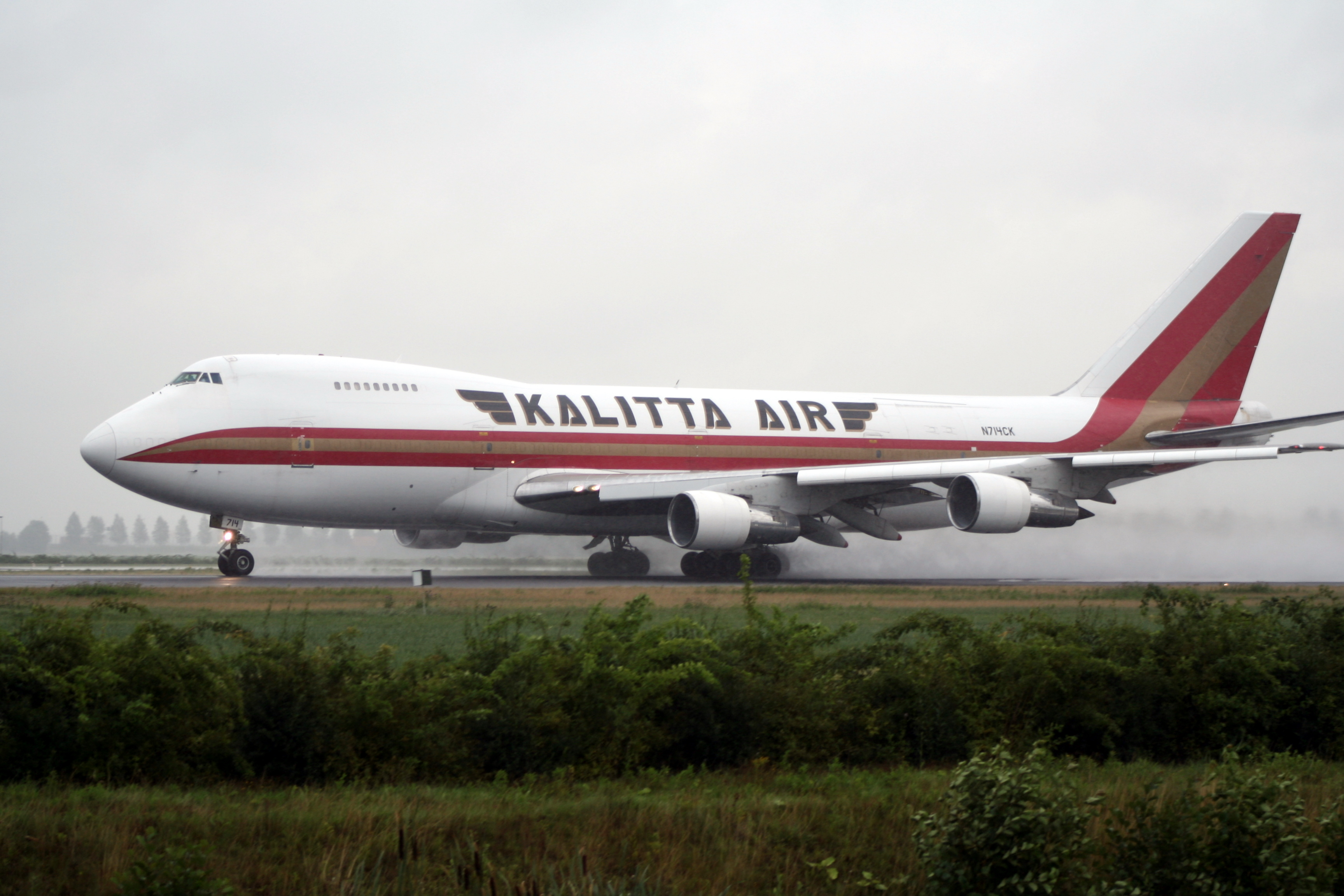
- N714CK, the aircraft involved in the accident, pictured in 2006

Accident
- Date: July 7, 2008
- Summary: Engine failure on take-off
- Site: Madrid, Cundinamarca, Colombia
- Total fatalities: 2

Aircraft
- Aircraft type: Boeing 747-209B(SF)
- Operator: Centurion Air Cargo on behalf of Kalitta Air
- Call sign: CENTURION 164
- Registration: N714CK
- Flight origin: El Dorado International Airport, Bogotá, Colombia
- Destination: Miami International Airport, Miami, Florida, United States
- Occupants: 8
- Passengers: 0
- Crew: 8
- Fatalities: 0
- Injuries: 8
- Survivors: 8

Ground casualties
- Ground fatalities: 2

Centurion Air Cargo Flight 164 was a chartered international cargo flight, flying from Bogotá's El Dorado International Airport while en route to Miami International Airport. The flight was operated by Kalitta Air and the aircraft was wet leased by Centurion Air Cargo. On July 7, 2008, the aircraft, a Boeing 747-200 registered as N714CK, crashed shortly after takeoff. All aboard suffered injuries, but none were killed. Two people on the ground were killed after the plane slammed into a farm. The crash was the second crash of a Boeing 747 in 2008 in Kalitta Air service after a previous accident at Brussels in May.

An investigation was launched by Colombian authorities and concluded that the crash was caused by dual engine failures. During its take-off phase, engine 4 and then engine 1 suffered loss of power. The flight crews could not recover the plane, which subsequently crashed into a ranch house.

== Accident ==
The aircraft took off from El Dorado International Airport in route to Miami International Airport carrying eight crew and a cargo of flowers, as a chartered cargo flight. The flight was operated by Kalitta Air for Centurion Air Cargo as Flight 164. During its rotation, the engine 4 suffered a non-recoverable surge, causing it to lose power. It then declared emergency twenty seconds later reporting an engine fire in engine 4 (outer right-hand engine) and requested to return to runway 14R. Bogotá Tower cleared the airplane for that return to and for landing on 14R. The airplane initiated a left-hand turn as by the published engine out procedure. Just about twenty seconds after the loss of the engine 4, engine 1 failed. By this time, the aircraft had lost its ability to climb and started to lose control.

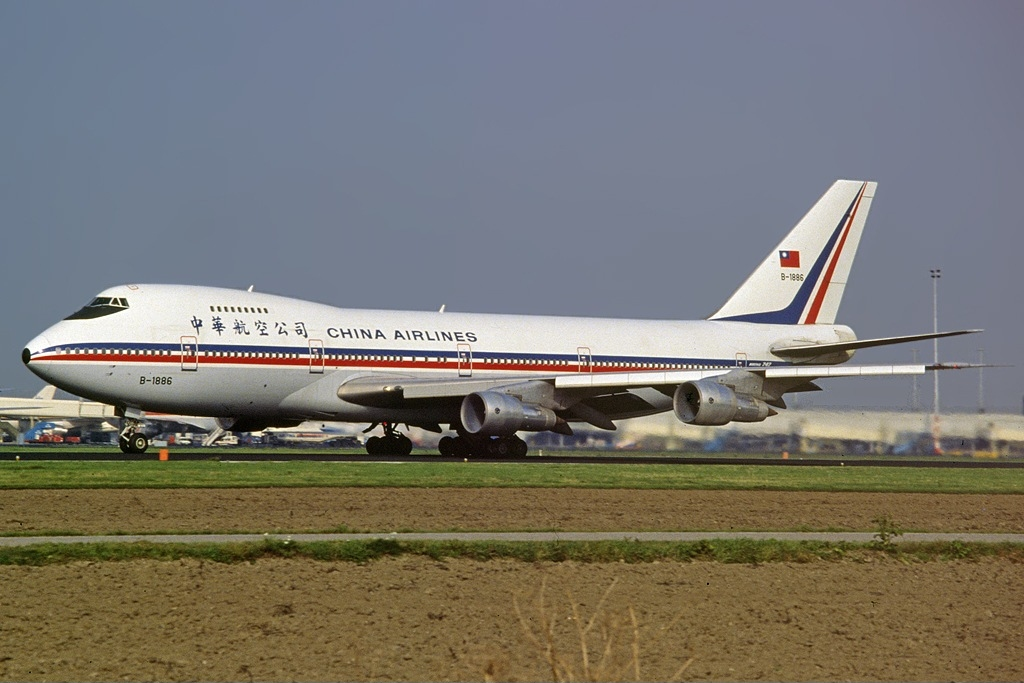
The aircraft involved in crash while still operating with China Airlines as a passenger aircraft

The crew quickly recognized that they no longer had the thrust necessary to get back to the airport and attempted an off-airport landing. A taxi driver fueling his car at the nearby petrol station said that the airplane hit the wires along the highway triggering sparks, before it impacted ground. The aircraft crashed at 03:57 local time. It skimmed over trees and crash landed, skidded along the field, and slammed into a ranch house, killing two people, Pedro Suarez, 50, and his 13-year-old son Edwin. The aircraft then broke up into several sections.

Rescuers immediately arrived at the crash site and evacuated the survivors. All eight crew members survived, but one was in critical condition. At least five people were seriously injured in the crash. Two crew members were treated at a Madrid hospital, while six others were sent to the Central Police Hospital in Bogotá.

== Aircraft ==
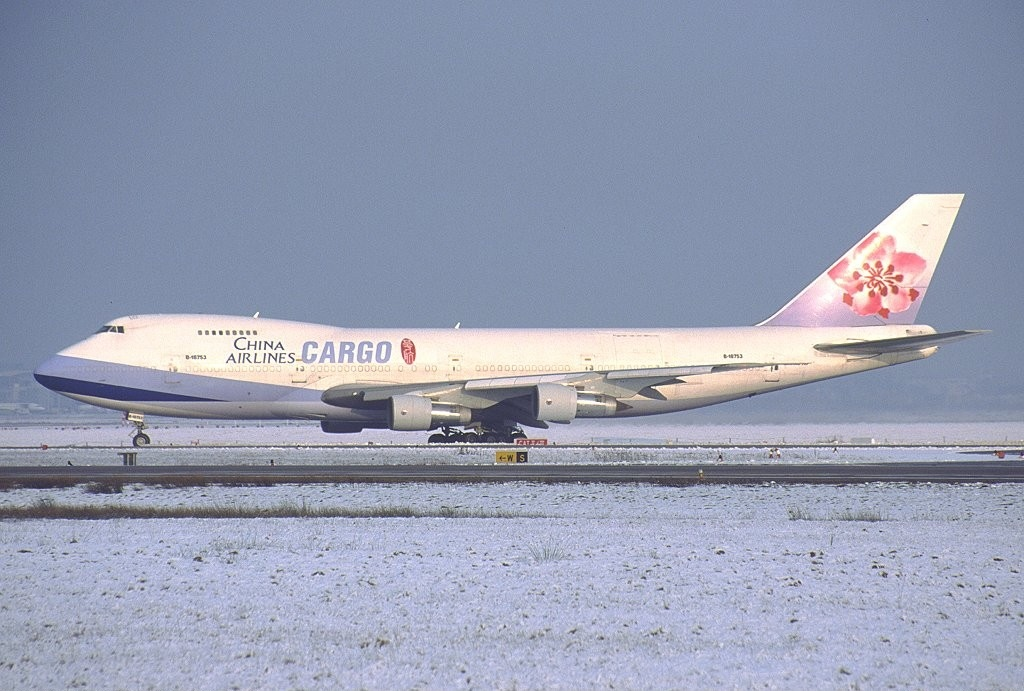
N714CK when it was still in service with China Airlines Cargo

The aircraft, a Boeing 747-209BSF, registered as N714CK, was twenty-seven years old. It had a total airframe hours of 90,613 hours and was equipped with four Pratt & Whitney JT9D-7AQ engines with a MSN number of 519. It was delivered to China Airlines in 1981 as B-1886. In 1999, the plane was given a new registration as B-18753 when it was transferred to China Airlines's freight division, China Airlines Cargo, until they were grounded by the Republic of China in May 2002 following the crash of China Airlines Flight 611. Finally, it was acquired by Kalitta Air in November of the same year.

== Investigation ==
The Colombian Grupo de Investigacion de Accidentes opened an investigation into the crash. The U.S National Transportation Safety Board sent five investigators to assist the Colombian investigation team. The Federal Aviation Administration, aircraft-maker Boeing Co. and engine-maker Pratt & Whitney also assisted the investigation.

The 51-year-old Captain Bryant Beebe (8,874 hours total, 2,874 hours on type) was the pilot flying; the 49-year-old First officer Ivan Dankha (11,373 hours total, 2,853 hours on type) was the pilot monitoring. The 59-year-old Flight engineer Joseph Kendall had a total flying experience of 10,665 hours, with 2,665 hours on type.

Both the flight data recorder and the cockpit voice recorder were recovered and taken for an analysis. The aircraft was configured for takeoff with flaps at 10 degrees (the flaps remaining in that position until impact) with the engines at EPR between 1.69 and 1.72, when it accelerated through Vr (152 knots) and rotation was initiated. When the aircraft rotated, engine 4 lost power as the pitch went through 13 degrees nose up and the airspeed already exceeded V2 (162 KIAS), with the engine rolling down from about 1.7 EPR to 1.0 EPR within two to three seconds. That engine surged four times during that time. Engineers determined that the high-pressure turbine of engine 4, which had been installed during the last work shop visit in January 2008, was inefficient due to too large a blade tip clearance, the reduced chord, and wear of leading edges of fan blades, which resulted in an estimate loss of engine power of 5.8% and impaired stability and operability of that engine.

Engine 1 then suffered a failure of the low-pressure turbine, which resulted in ejection of engine parts through the engine exhaust. The failure originated in the third stage of the LPT, and engineers believe the failure started with the loss of a number of guide vanes or the loss of a large piece of outside air seal due to thermal damage. Although an overboost condition existed outside regular engine operation range, the application of such engine power for a short period of time should not have caused an engine failure. The exact cause of the engine failure could not be determined.

Investigators noted that engine 2 suffered a rapid decline of EPR and recovery of EPR for five times, each lasting for about two to three seconds, with the surges occurring at eight-seven, thirty-three, thirteen, and three seconds before impact, respectively. Eventually, the aircraft crashed.

On 22 August 2011, the investigation board finally published the final report. The crash was caused by the failure of two engines of the aircraft, engine 4 and engine 1. Engine 4 suffered a non-recoverable surge during rotation. The aircraft then struggled to climb. As the flight crew were conducting the emergency procedure, the engine 1 failed. With two engines malfunctioning, the aircraft was unable to sustain flight in its configuration. It began to experience problems with a third engine, the inboard left-hand JT9D, which repeatedly surged.

== See also ==
- Kalitta Air Flight 207, also a Kalitta Air Boeing 747 crashed on take-off from Brussels airport due to birds hitting the engines on May 25, 2008.
- Air Algérie Flight 6289, Algeria's deadliest passenger plane crash, which was caused due to engine failure on takeoff.
