= Kalitta Charters =

Airline of the United States

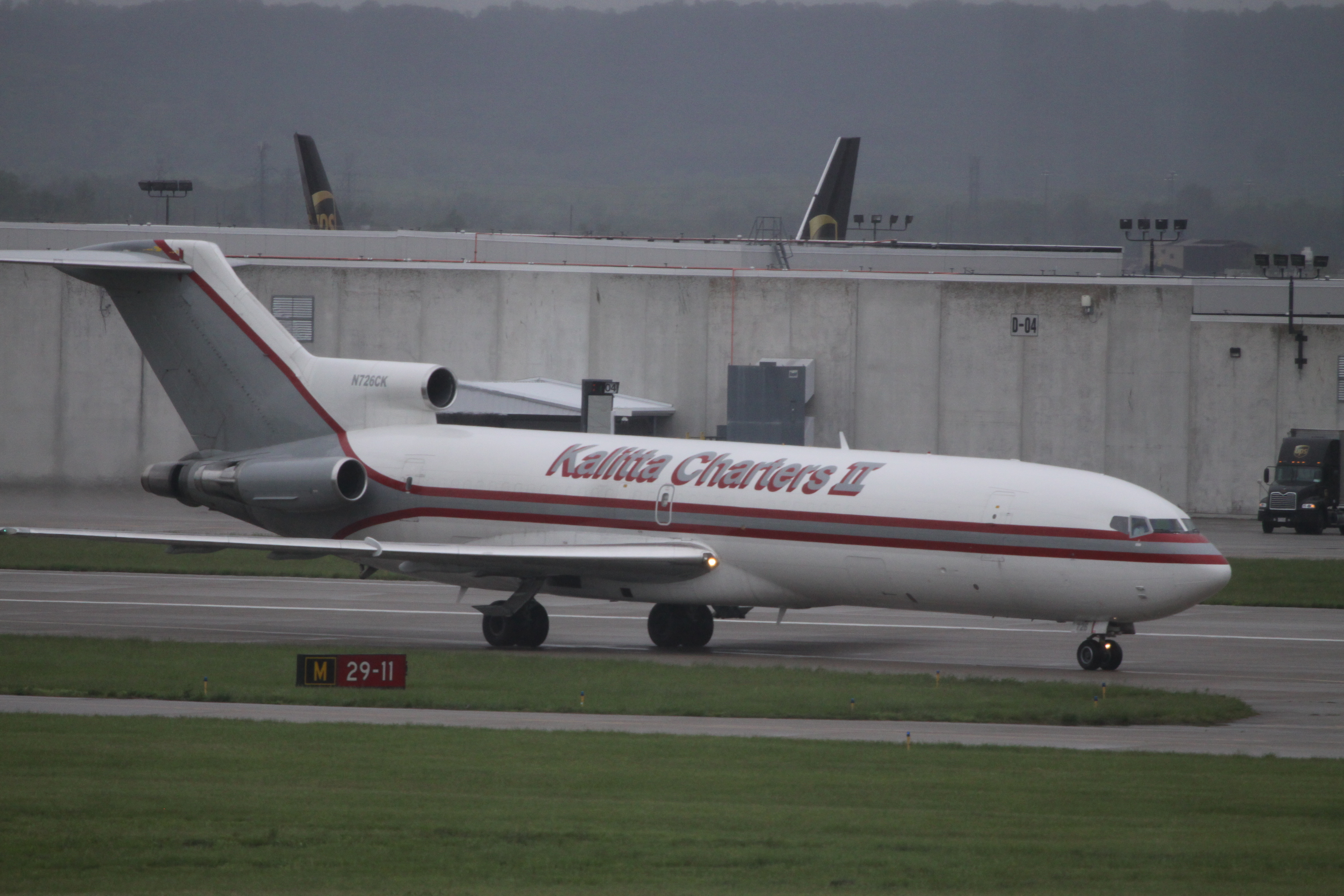
- Boeing 727-200F
IATA	ICAO	Call sign
K9; K5	KFS; KII	KALITTA; DRAGSTER
- Founded: 2001
- AOC #: K11A535K
- Operating bases: Willow Run Airport
- Fleet size: 43
- Headquarters: Ypsilanti, Michigan, United States
- Key people: Doug Kalitta, President
- Website: kalittacharters.com

Kalitta Charters is an American charter airline headquartered in Ypsilanti, Michigan, with its main base at Willow Run Airport.

== Overview ==
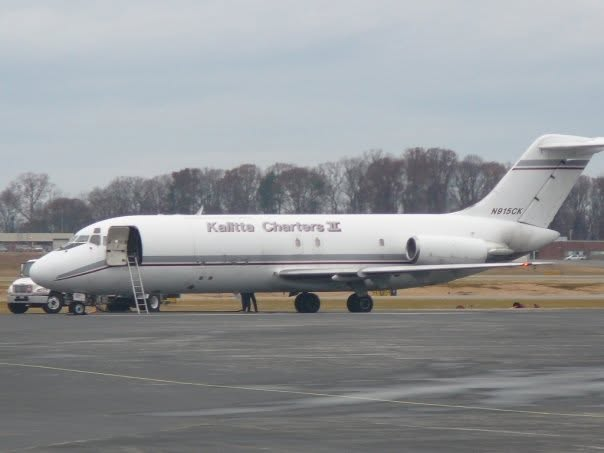
Kalitta Charters DC-9 Freighter at TAC Air ramp at McGhee Tyson Airport

The company is owned and run by Doug Kalitta, nephew of Kalitta Air founder Connie Kalitta. Kalitta Charters offers Executive Charter, Air Ambulance & Air Cargo services, and a FAR Part 145 aircraft repair station at their operating facility in Ypsilanti, Michigan.

In August 2015, Kalitta Charters acquired AirNet.

Kalitta Charters is a Part 135 On-Demand cargo and passenger charter operation. Kalitta Charters II is a Part 121 On-Demand Cargo operator.

Kalitta Charters is the sole company with a contract with the US government to fly service members' remains to their final resting places from Dover Air Force Base.

In April 2024, Kalitta Charters II retired their remaining Boeing 727s, previously being one of the last operators worldwide.

== Fleet ==
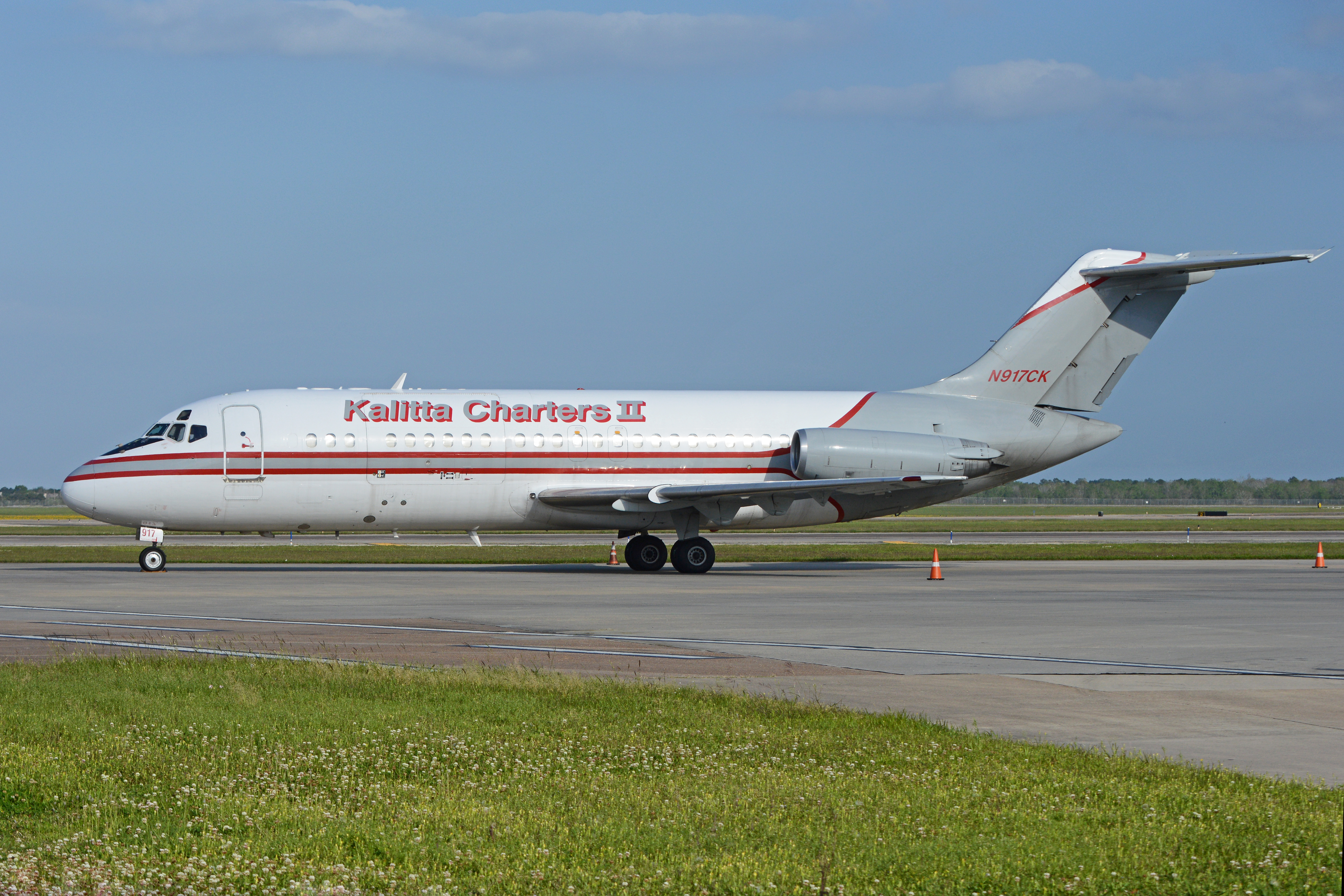
Douglas DC 9-15F.

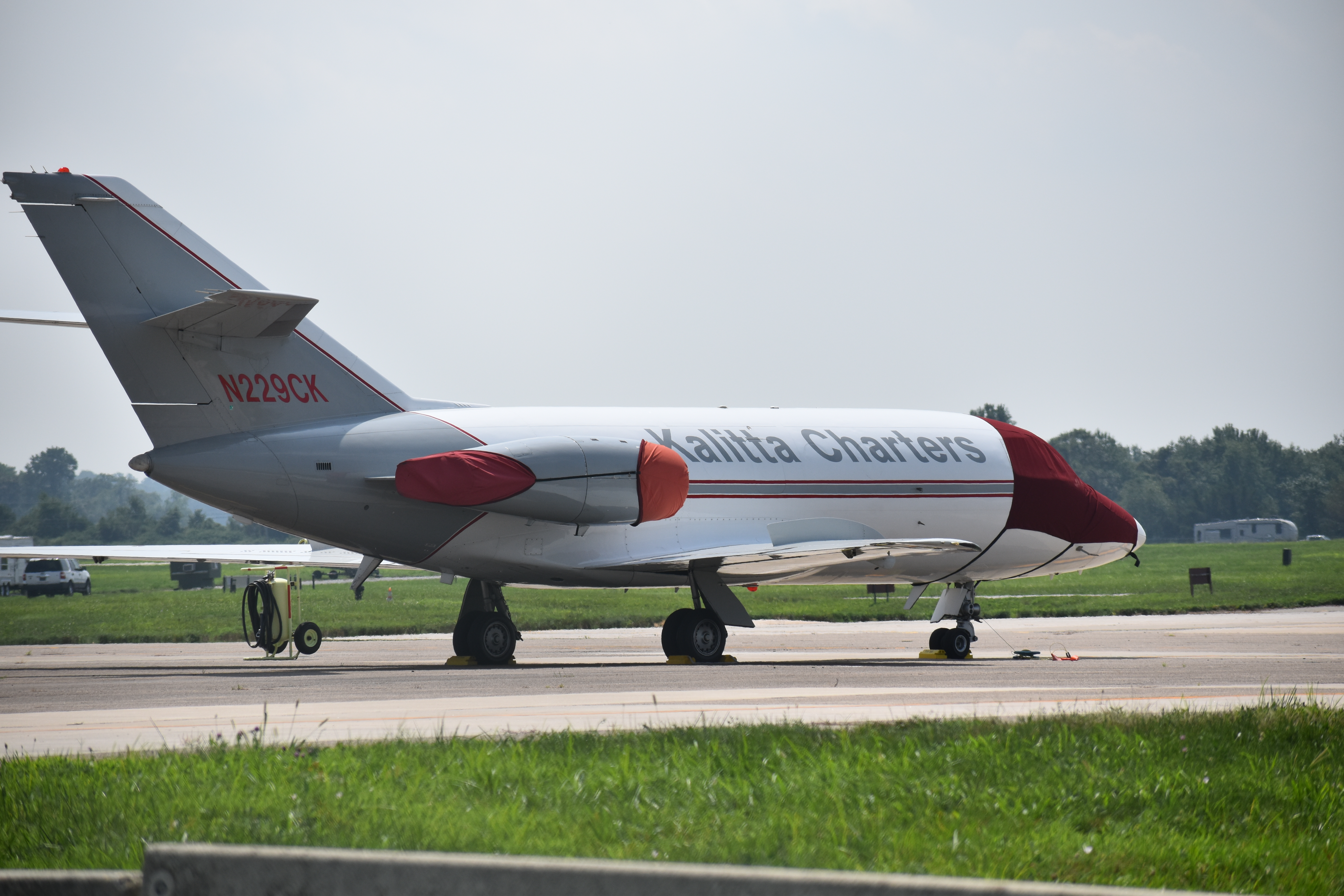
Dassault Falcon 20

As of April 2024, the Kalitta Charters and Kalitta Charters II fleet comprises the following aircraft:

Kalitta Charters fleet
Aircraft	In fleet	Notes
Boeing 737-300F	5	(as of August 2025)
Boeing 737-400F/SF	12	(as of August 2025)
Boeing 737-800F	4	(as of August 2025)
Bombardier Challenger 601	2	
Dassault Falcon 20	8	
Beech King Air 200	1	
Learjet 35	8	
Learjet 36	2	
Learjet 45	4	
Total	43	

Kalitta Charters (and Kalitta Charters II) formerly operated the following aircraft:

Former Fleet
Aircraft	Number	Introduction	Retired	Notes and References
Boeing 727-200F	9	2000	2024	

== See also ==
- Kalitta Air
