= List of census-designated places in Michigan =

Map of the United States with Michigan highlighted

The following is a list of census-designated places in Michigan. According to the United States Census Bureau, the U.S. state of Michigan listed 212 census-designated places (CDPs) used for statistical purposes at the 2020 census.

In the state of Michigan, CDPs are also categorized as unincorporated communities and do not hold any legal autonomy as an incorporated municipality. Their boundaries and population counts are for statistical purposes only, and CDPs fall under the jurisdiction of the township(s) in which they are located. CDPs can span multiple townships and counties and be part of a civil township or charter township but cannot contain boundaries within incorporated municipalities, such as villages or cities. Boundaries for a CDP may change between a census.

There are no minimum population requirements for an area to be designated as a CDP. The smallest CDP by population is Pilgrim with a population of 44. The smallest CDP by land area is Ponshewaing at 0.09 square miles (0.23 km^{2}). Forest Hills is the largest CDP in terms of both land and population with 28,573 residents and an area of 49.30 square miles (127.69 km^{2}).

== Former census-designated places ==
Census-designated places were first introduced by the U.S. Census Bureau for the 1980 census. In some cases, a census-designated place may cease to exist and not be reported on an upcoming census. This may be a result of deletion, reclassification, or if the CDP becomes absorbed into an incorporated municipality. For the 2010 census, the U.S. Census Bureau removed 14 CDPs from Michigan. Of those, 11 were classified as minor civil divisions (MCD) that were already conterminous with an organized township and did not require dual designations. For the 2010 census, the U.S. Census Bureau removed the CDP designation for any MCD that was coextensive with a designated CDP. In Michigan, these remaining townships included Bloomfield, Canton, Carrollton, Clinton, Grosse Ile, Harrison, Plymouth, Redford, Shelby, Waterford, and West Bloomfield. These townships are no longer classified as CDPs, and there are no municipalities in the state that carry the CDP designation.

The K.I. Sawyer CDP, which was listed as the "military K. I. Sawyer AFB CDP" in 2000, was also deleted, but a small portion of the deleted CDP was reorganized and renamed as the "civilian K. I. Sawyer CDP" for the 2010 census. Greater Galesburg, Saginaw Township North, and Saginaw Township South are the only three to have been completely dissolved and not reported in any form from the 2000 census to the 2010 census.

For the 2020 census, only one CDP was not reported from the previous census. The Barnes Lake–Millers Lake CDP was not listed in the 2020 census, as it was split into two distinct CDPs instead: Barnes Lake and Millers Lake.

== Current list ==
The following table lists all the census-designated places (CDPs) in Michigan according to data from the 2020 census. All information comes from 2020 census data, as well as listing population changes from the 2010 census when applicable. In the 2020 census, the state contained 212 CDPs, which is 53 more than reported in the 2010 census. Newly designated CDPs will not have 2010 census information since that CDP did not exist at the time. In the cases where a CDP spans multiple townships or counties, the township and county listed first contains the largest land area for the CDP.

Three CDPs also serve as a county seat: Atlanta (Montmorency County), Eagle River (Keweenaw County), and Mio (Oscoda County). Being designated as a county seat, however, does not give any legal authority or autonomy to the CDP and is merely the location of the county's seat of government.

CDP that also serves as a county seat †

CDP	County	Township	Population		Change (%)	Land area	Population density
CDP	County	Township	2020	2010	Change (%)	Land area	Population density
Advance	Charlevoix	Eveline	340	328	+3.66%	2.72 sq mi (7.04 km^{2})	125.00/sq mi (48.26/km^{2})
Alba	Antrim	Chestonia; Star	287	295	−2.71%	2.73 sq mi (7.07 km^{2})	105.13/sq mi (40.59/km^{2})
Alden	Antrim	Helena	123	125	−1.60%	0.40 sq mi (1.04 km^{2})	307.50/sq mi (118.73/km^{2})
Allendale	Ottawa	Allendale	27,073	17,579	+54.01%	23.23 sq mi (60.17 km^{2})	1,165.43/sq mi (449.98/km^{2})
Amasa	Iron	Hematite	195	283	−31.10%	4.04 sq mi (10.46 km^{2})	48.27/sq mi (18.64/km^{2})
Arcadia	Manistee	Arcadia	309	291	+6.19%	0.60 sq mi (1.55 km^{2})	515.00/sq mi (198.84/km^{2})
Argentine	Genesee	Argentine	2,685	2,525	+6.34%	2.37 sq mi (6.14 km^{2})	1,132.91/sq mi (437.42/km^{2})
Atlanta †	Montmorency	Briley; Avery	720	827	−12.94%	3.61 sq mi (9.35 km^{2})	199.45/sq mi (77.01/km^{2})
Atlantic Mine	Houghton	Adams	565			1.10 sq mi (2.85 km^{2})	513.64/sq mi (198.32/km^{2})
Attica	Lapeer	Attica	962	994	−3.22%	4.78 sq mi (12.38 km^{2})	201.26/sq mi (77.71/km^{2})
Au Sable	Iosco	Au Sable	1,453	1,404	+3.49%	2.10 sq mi (5.44 km^{2})	691.90/sq mi (267.15/km^{2})
Barnes Lake	Lapeer	Deerfield	768			1.55 sq mi (4.01 km^{2})	495.48/sq mi (191.31/km^{2})
Bath	Clinton	Bath	2,841	2,083	+36.39%	5.86 sq mi (15.18 km^{2})	484.81/sq mi (187.19/km^{2})
Bay Port	Huron	Fairhaven; McKinley	464	477	−2.73%	3.35 sq mi (8.68 km^{2})	138.51/sq mi (53.48/km^{2})
Bay Shore	Charlevoix; Emmet	Hayes; Resort	687	754	−8.89%	1.55 sq mi (4.01 km^{2})	443.23/sq mi (171.13/km^{2})
Bay View	Emmet	Bear Creek	183	133	+37.59%	0.38 sq mi (0.98 km^{2})	481.58/sq mi (185.94/km^{2})
Beal City	Isabella	Nottawa	332	357	−7.00%	4.01 sq mi (10.39 km^{2})	82.79/sq mi (31.97/km^{2})
Bear Lake	Kalkaska	Bear Lake	366	327	+11.93%	5.76 sq mi (14.92 km^{2})	63.54/sq mi (24.53/km^{2})
Beecher	Genesee	Mount Morris; Genesee	8,840	10,232	−13.60%	5.88 sq mi (15.23 km^{2})	1,478.26/sq mi (570.76/km^{2})
Beechwood	Ottawa	Holland; Park	3,121	3,015	+3.52%	1.81 sq mi (4.69 km^{2})	1,724.31/sq mi (665.76/km^{2})
Bendon	Benzie	Inland	210	208	+0.96%	2.00 sq mi (5.18 km^{2})	105.00/sq mi (40.54/km^{2})
Benton Heights	Berrien	Benton	3,652	4,084	−10.58%	3.86 sq mi (10.00 km^{2})	946.11/sq mi (365.30/km^{2})
Bergland	Ontonagon	Bergland	141			0.73 sq mi (1.89 km^{2})	193.15/sq mi (74.58/km^{2})
Big Bay	Marquette	Powell	257	319	−19.44%	3.90 sq mi (10.10 km^{2})	65.90/sq mi (25.44/km^{2})
Boon	Wexford	Boon	90	167	−46.11%	0.84 sq mi (2.18 km^{2})	107.14/sq mi (41.37/km^{2})
Brethren	Manistee	Dickson	331	410	−19.27%	1.28 sq mi (3.32 km^{2})	258.59/sq mi (99.84/km^{2})
Bridgeport	Saginaw	Bridgeport	6,571	6,950	−5.45%	8.40 sq mi (21.76 km^{2})	782.26/sq mi (302.03/km^{2})
Brimley	Chippewa	Superior	504			1.75 sq mi (4.53 km^{2})	288.00/sq mi (111.20/km^{2})
Brownlee Park	Calhoun	Emmett; Pennfield	2,021	2,108	−4.13%	2.02 sq mi (5.23 km^{2})	1,000.50/sq mi (386.29/km^{2})
Bruce Crossing	Ontonagon	Stannard	184			4.51 sq mi (11.68 km^{2})	40.80/sq mi (15.75/km^{2})
Brutus	Emmet	Maple River	202	218	−7.34%	2.82 sq mi (7.30 km^{2})	71.63/sq mi (27.66/km^{2})
Buena Vista	Saginaw	Buena Vista	5,855	6,816	−14.10%	4.00 sq mi (10.36 km^{2})	1,463.75/sq mi (565.16/km^{2})
Burt	Saginaw	Taymouth	1,194	1,228	−2.77%	6.04 sq mi (15.64 km^{2})	197.68/sq mi (76.33/km^{2})
Byron Center	Kent	Byron	7,431	5,822	+27.64%	5.08 sq mi (13.16 km^{2})	1,462.80/sq mi (564.79/km^{2})
Caberfae	Wexford	South Branch; Slagle	72	64	+12.50%	0.44 sq mi (1.14 km^{2})	163.64/sq mi (63.18/km^{2})
Cambria	Hillsdale	Cambria	258			1.24 sq mi (3.21 km^{2})	208.06/sq mi (80.33/km^{2})
Canada Creek Ranch	Montmorency	Montmorency	258	304	−15.13%	2.23 sq mi (5.78 km^{2})	115.70/sq mi (44.67/km^{2})
Canadian Lakes	Mecosta	Morton; Austin	3,202	2,756	+16.18%	10.33 sq mi (26.75 km^{2})	309.97/sq mi (119.68/km^{2})
Cannonsburg	Kent	Cannon	203			0.42 sq mi (1.09 km^{2})	483.33/sq mi (186.62/km^{2})
Carp Lake	Emmet	Carp Lake	356	357	−0.28%	2.06 sq mi (5.34 km^{2})	172.82/sq mi (66.72/km^{2})
Cedar	Leelanau	Solon	102	93	+9.68%	0.18 sq mi (0.47 km^{2})	566.67/sq mi (218.79/km^{2})
Chassell	Houghton	Chassell	876			3.62 sq mi (9.38 km^{2})	241.99/sq mi (93.43/km^{2})
Chums Corner	Grand Traverse	Blair	1,065	946	+12.58%	2.66 sq mi (6.89 km^{2})	400.38/sq mi (154.59/km^{2})
Comstock Northwest	Kalamazoo	Comstock; Kalamazoo	5,562	5,455	+1.96%	3.23 sq mi (8.37 km^{2})	1,721.98/sq mi (664.86/km^{2})
Comstock Park	Kent	Alpine; Planfield	10,500	10,008	+4.92%	3.88 sq mi (10.05 km^{2})	2,579.38/sq mi (995.90/km^{2})
Conway	Emmet	Little Traverse; Bear Creek	338	204	+65.69%	0.42 sq mi (1.09 km^{2})	804.76/sq mi (310.72/km^{2})
Copper Harbor	Keweenaw	Grant	136	108	+25.93%	1.51 sq mi (3.91 km^{2})	90.07/sq mi (34.77/km^{2})
Covington	Baraga	Covington	99			3.54 sq mi (9.17 km^{2})	27.97/sq mi (10.80/km^{2})
Cross Village	Emmet	Cross Village	79	93	−15.05%	0.76 sq mi (1.97 km^{2})	103.95/sq mi (40.13/km^{2})
Crystal	Montcalm	Crystal	888			2.76 sq mi (7.15 km^{2})	321.74/sq mi (124.22/km^{2})
Crystal Downs Country Club	Benzie	Lake	55	47	+17.02%	1.26 sq mi (3.26 km^{2})	43.65/sq mi (16.85/km^{2})
Crystal Mountain	Benzie	Weldon	73	54	+35.19%	1.78 sq mi (4.61 km^{2})	41.01/sq mi (15.83/km^{2})
Cutlerville	Kent	Byron; Gaines	17,849	14,730	+21.17%	5.74 sq mi (14.87 km^{2})	3,109.58/sq mi (1,200.62/km^{2})
Delton	Barry	Barry	854	872	−2.06%	2.21 sq mi (5.72 km^{2})	386.43/sq mi (149.20/km^{2})
Detroit Beach	Monroe	Frenchtown	1,957	2,087	−6.23%	0.62 sq mi (1.61 km^{2})	3,156.45/sq mi (1,218.71/km^{2})
Dodgeville	Houghton	Portage	391			0.54 sq mi (1.40 km^{2})	724.07/sq mi (279.57/km^{2})
Dollar Bay	Houghton	Osceola; Franklin; Torch Lake	1,060	1,082	−2.03%	3.94 sq mi (10.20 km^{2})	269.04/sq mi (103.88/km^{2})
Dorr	Allegan	Dorr	3,520			3.20 sq mi (8.29 km^{2})	1,338.44/sq mi (516.77/km^{2})
Dowling	Barry	Baltimore	351	374	−6.15%	6.08 sq mi (15.75 km^{2})	57.73/sq mi (22.29/km^{2})
Eagle Harbor	Keweenaw	Eagle Harbor	69	76	−9.21%	1.80 sq mi (4.66 km^{2})	38.33/sq mi (14.80/km^{2})
Eagle River †	Keweenaw	Houghton; Allouez	65	71	−8.45%	6.20 sq mi (16.06 km^{2})	10.48/sq mi (4.05/km^{2})
Eastport	Antrim	Torch Lake	206	218	−5.50%	1.99 sq mi (5.15 km^{2})	103.52/sq mi (39.97/km^{2})
Eastwood	Kalamazoo	Kalamazoo	6,366	6,340	+0.41%	1.96 sq mi (5.08 km^{2})	3,247.96/sq mi (1,254.04/km^{2})
Edgemont Park	Ingham	Lansing	2,326	2,358	−1.36%	0.83 sq mi (2.15 km^{2})	2,802.41/sq mi (1,082.02/km^{2})
Elm Hall	Gratiot	Sumner	279			1.40 sq mi (3.63 km^{2})	199.29/sq mi (76.94/km^{2})
Eureka	Clinton	Greenbush	233			1.01 sq mi (2.62 km^{2})	230.69/sq mi (89.07/km^{2})
Ewen	Ontonagon	McMillan	229			0.84 sq mi (2.18 km^{2})	272.62/sq mi (105.26/km^{2})
Fair Plain	Berrien	Benton; St. Joseph	7,402	7,631	−3.00%	4.30 sq mi (11.14 km^{2})	1,721.40/sq mi (664.63/km^{2})
Falmouth	Missaukee	Clam Union	183			0.68 sq mi (1.76 km^{2})	269.12/sq mi (103.91/km^{2})
Filer City	Manistee	Filer	136	116	+17.24%	0.26 sq mi (0.67 km^{2})	523.08/sq mi (201.96/km^{2})
Forest Hills	Kent	Ada; Cascade	28,573	25,867	+10.46%	49.30 sq mi (127.69 km^{2})	579.57/sq mi (223.77/km^{2})
Fostoria	Tuscola	Watertown	664	694	−4.32%	4.01 sq mi (10.39 km^{2})	165.59/sq mi (63.93/km^{2})
Freeland	Saginaw	Tittabawassee	7,630	6,969	+9.48%	6.59 sq mi (17.07 km^{2})	1,157.81/sq mi (447.03/km^{2})
Fulton	Keweenaw	Allouez	149			0.48 sq mi (1.24 km^{2})	310.42/sq mi (119.85/km^{2})
Glen Arbor	Leelanau	Glen Arbor	261	229	+13.97%	1.03 sq mi (2.67 km^{2})	253.40/sq mi (97.84/km^{2})
Grand Marais	Alger	Burt	234			1.89 sq mi (4.90 km^{2})	123.81/sq mi (47.80/km^{2})
Grawn	Grand Traverse	Blair	816	772	+5.70%	0.65 sq mi (1.68 km^{2})	1,255.38/sq mi (484.71/km^{2})
Greenland	Ontonagon	Greenland	146			0.41 sq mi (1.06 km^{2})	356.10/sq mi (137.49/km^{2})
Greilickville	Leelanau	Elmwood	1,634	1,530	+6.80%	4.59 sq mi (11.89 km^{2})	355.99/sq mi (137.45/km^{2})
Gwinn	Marquette	Forsyth	1,784	1,917	−6.94%	2.81 sq mi (7.28 km^{2})	634.88/sq mi (245.13/km^{2})
Hardwood Acres	Benzie	Almira	393	432	−9.03%	0.53 sq mi (1.37 km^{2})	741.51/sq mi (286.30/km^{2})
Haring	Wexford	Haring	335	328	+2.13%	2.31 sq mi (5.98 km^{2})	145.02/sq mi (55.99/km^{2})
Hartland	Livingston	Hartland	777			2.28 sq mi (5.91 km^{2})	340.79/sq mi (131.58/km^{2})
Harvey	Marquette	Chocolay	3,244	1,393	+132.88%	6.74 sq mi (17.46 km^{2})	481.31/sq mi (185.83/km^{2})
Haslett	Ingham	Meridian	19,670	18,731	+5.01%	15.39 sq mi (39.86 km^{2})	1,278.10/sq mi (493.48/km^{2})
Hemlock	Saginaw	Richland	1,408	1,466	−3.96%	2.75 sq mi (7.12 km^{2})	512.00/sq mi (197.68/km^{2})
Henderson	Shiawassee	Rush	413	399	+3.51%	3.60 sq mi (9.32 km^{2})	114.72/sq mi (44.29/km^{2})
Hermansville	Menominee	Meyer	509			1.27 sq mi (3.29 km^{2})	400.79/sq mi (154.74/km^{2})
Hickory Corners	Barry	Barry	313	322	−2.80%	2.07 sq mi (5.36 km^{2})	151.21/sq mi (58.38/km^{2})
Holt	Ingham	Delhi	25,625	23,973	+6.89%	15.66 sq mi (40.56 km^{2})	1,636.33/sq mi (631.79/km^{2})
Horton Bay	Charlevoix	Bay	485	512	−5.27%	4.82 sq mi (12.48 km^{2})	100.62/sq mi (38.85/km^{2})
Houghton Lake	Roscommon	Roscommon; Denton; Lake	5,294	3,427	+54.48%	10.75 sq mi (27.84 km^{2})	492.47/sq mi (190.14/km^{2})
Hubbard Lake	Alcona	Caledonia; Alcona; Hawes	857	1,002	−14.47%	8.74 sq mi (22.64 km^{2})	98.05/sq mi (37.86/km^{2})
Hubbell	Houghton	Torch Lake; Osceola	908	946	−4.02%	1.87 sq mi (4.84 km^{2})	485.56/sq mi (187.48/km^{2})
Hurontown	Houghton	Portage	244			0.16 sq mi (0.41 km^{2})	1,525.00/sq mi (588.81/km^{2})
Ida	Monroe	Ida; Raisinville	790			2.47 sq mi (6.40 km^{2})	319.84/sq mi (123.49/km^{2})
Indian River	Cheboygan	Tuscarora	1,950	1,959	−0.46%	12.93 sq mi (33.49 km^{2})	150.81/sq mi (58.23/km^{2})
Interlochen	Grand Traverse	Green Lake	694	583	+19.04%	1.24 sq mi (3.21 km^{2})	559.68/sq mi (216.09/km^{2})
Ironton	Charlevoix	Eveline	148	140	+5.71%	1.02 sq mi (2.64 km^{2})	145.10/sq mi (56.02/km^{2})
Jasper	Lenawee	Fairfield	371	412	−9.95%	4.03 sq mi (10.44 km^{2})	92.06/sq mi (35.54/km^{2})
Jenison	Ottawa	Georgetown	16,640	16,538	+0.62%	5.86 sq mi (15.18 km^{2})	2,839.59/sq mi (1,096.37/km^{2})
Jennings	Missaukee	Lake; Caldwell	229	264	−13.26%	0.76 sq mi (1.97 km^{2})	301.32/sq mi (116.34/km^{2})
Kincheloe	Chippewa	Kinross; Caldwell	2587			1.27 sq mi (3.29 km^{2})	2,037.01/sq mi (786.49/km^{2})
K. I. Sawyer	Marquette	Forsyth; West Branch	3,064	2,624	+16.77%	1.71 sq mi (4.43 km^{2})	1,791.81/sq mi (691.82/km^{2})
Lake Fenton	Genesee	Fenton	5,905	5,559	+6.22%	5.52 sq mi (14.30 km^{2})	1,069.75/sq mi (413.03/km^{2})
Lake Gogebic	Ontonagon	Bergland	122			1.08 sq mi (2.80 km^{2})	112.96/sq mi (43.62/km^{2})
Lake LeAnn	Hillsdale	Somerset	1571			1.66 sq mi (4.30 km^{2})	946.39/sq mi (365.40/km^{2})
Lake Leelanau	Leelanau	Leland	229	253	−9.49%	0.26 sq mi (0.67 km^{2})	880.77/sq mi (340.07/km^{2})
Lake Michigan Beach	Berrien	Hagar	1,101	1,216	−9.46%	3.83 sq mi (9.92 km^{2})	287.47/sq mi (110.99/km^{2})
Lakeport	St. Clair	Burtchville	720			1.03 sq mi (2.67 km^{2})	699.03/sq mi (269.90/km^{2})
Lake Victoria	Clinton	Victor	984	930	+5.81%	0.82 sq mi (2.12 km^{2})	1,200.00/sq mi (463.32/km^{2})
Lakes of the North	Antrim	Mancelona; Star	1,044	925	+12.86%	16.58 sq mi (42.94 km^{2})	62.97/sq mi (24.31/km^{2})
Lambertville	Monroe	Bedford	10,433	9,953	+4.82%	6.74 sq mi (17.46 km^{2})	1,547.92/sq mi (597.66/km^{2})
Lamont	Ottawa	Tallmadge; Polkton	1094			2.80 sq mi (7.25 km^{2})	390.71/sq mi (150.86/km^{2})
Leland	Leelanau	Leland	410	377	+8.75%	0.98 sq mi (2.54 km^{2})	418.37/sq mi (161.53/km^{2})
Level Park–Oak Park	Calhoun	Bedford	3,260	3,409	−4.37%	5.20 sq mi (13.47 km^{2})	626.92/sq mi (242.06/km^{2})
Levering	Emmet	McKinley; Carp Lake	176	215	−18.14%	0.44 sq mi (1.14 km^{2})	400.00/sq mi (154.44/km^{2})
Lewiston	Montmorency	Albert	996	1,392	−28.45%	2.83 sq mi (7.33 km^{2})	351.94/sq mi (135.89/km^{2})
Loomis	Isabella	Wise	194	213	−8.92%	2.80 sq mi (7.25 km^{2})	69.29/sq mi (26.75/km^{2})
Lost Lake Woods	Alcona	Alcona	367	312	+17.63%	5.05 sq mi (13.08 km^{2})	72.67/sq mi (28.06/km^{2})
Lupton	Ogemaw	Rose	318	348	−8.62%	3.23 sq mi (8.37 km^{2})	98.45/sq mi (38.01/km^{2})
Manistee Lake	Kalkaska	Coldsprings; Excelsior	465	456	+1.97%	3.56 sq mi (9.22 km^{2})	130.62/sq mi (50.43/km^{2})
Manitou Beach–Devils Lake	Lenawee	Rollin; Woodstock	2,032	2,019	+0.64%	6.08 sq mi (15.75 km^{2})	334.21/sq mi (129.04/km^{2})
Maple City	Leelanau	Kasson	209	207	+0.97%	0.43 sq mi (1.11 km^{2})	486.05/sq mi (187.66/km^{2})
Maple Grove	Benzie	Almira	139	132	+5.30%	0.35 sq mi (0.91 km^{2})	397.14/sq mi (153.34/km^{2})
Marenisco	Gogebic	Marenisco	179	254	−29.53%	3.45 sq mi (8.94 km^{2})	51.88/sq mi (20.03/km^{2})
Mass City	Ontonagon	Greenland	148			0.54 sq mi (1.40 km^{2})	274.07/sq mi (105.82/km^{2})
Mears	Oceana	Golden	322			1.14 sq mi (2.95 km^{2})	291.23/sq mi (112.44/km^{2})
Michigamme	Marquette	Michigamme	255	271	−5.90%	2.38 sq mi (6.16 km^{2})	107.14/sq mi (41.37/km^{2})
Michigan Center	Jackson	Leoni	4,609	4,672	−1.35%	5.04 sq mi (13.05 km^{2})	914.48/sq mi (353.08/km^{2})
Middletown	Shiawassee	Caledonia	825	897	−8.03%	0.47 sq mi (1.22 km^{2})	1,755.32/sq mi (677.73/km^{2})
Millburg	Berrien	Benton	578			1.81 sq mi (4.69 km^{2})	319.34/sq mi (123.30/km^{2})
Millers Lake	Lapeer	Deerfield	311			1.51 sq mi (3.91 km^{2})	205.96/sq mi (79.52/km^{2})
Mio †	Oscoda	Big Creek; Mentor; Elmer	1,690	1,826	−7.45%	8.37 sq mi (21.68 km^{2})	201.91/sq mi (77.96/km^{2})
Mohawk	Keweenaw	Allouez	388			1.23 sq mi (3.19 km^{2})	315.45/sq mi (121.79/km^{2})
Napoleon	Jackson	Napoleon	1,131	1,258	−10.10%	2.62 sq mi (6.79 km^{2})	431.68/sq mi (166.67/km^{2})
Naubinway	Chippewa	Garfield	147			0.41 sq mi (1.06 km^{2})	358.54/sq mi (138.43/km^{2})
Nessen City	Benzie	Colfax	81	97	−16.49%	1.21 sq mi (3.13 km^{2})	66.94/sq mi (25.85/km^{2})
New Troy	Berrien	Weesaw	483	497	−2.82%	1.32 sq mi (3.42 km^{2})	365.91/sq mi (141.28/km^{2})
Northview	Kent	Plainfield; Grand Rapids	15,301	14,541	+5.23%	10.30 sq mi (26.68 km^{2})	1,485.53/sq mi (573.57/km^{2})
Norwood	Charlevoix	Norwood	144	142	+1.41%	2.03 sq mi (5.26 km^{2})	70.94/sq mi (27.39/km^{2})
Nunica	Ottawa	Crockery	351			1.83 sq mi (4.74 km^{2})	191.80/sq mi (74.06/km^{2})
Oak Hill	Manistee	Filer	545	569	−4.22%	0.50 sq mi (1.29 km^{2})	1,090.00/sq mi (420.85/km^{2})
Oden	Emmet	Littlefield	358	363	−1.38%	0.61 sq mi (1.58 km^{2})	586.89/sq mi (226.60/km^{2})
Okemos	Ingham	Meridian; Alaiedon; Williamstown	25,121	21,369	+17.56%	16.85 sq mi (43.64 km^{2})	1,490.86/sq mi (575.62/km^{2})
Omena	Leelanau	Leelanau	295	267	+10.49%	4.52 sq mi (11.71 km^{2})	65.27/sq mi (25.20/km^{2})
Oscoda	Iosco	Oscoda; Au Sable	916	903	+1.44%	0.87 sq mi (2.25 km^{2})	1,052.87/sq mi (406.52/km^{2})
Ossineke	Alpena	Sanborn	932	938	−0.64%	3.66 sq mi (9.48 km^{2})	254.64/sq mi (98.32/km^{2})
Painesdale	Houghton	Adams	336			0.40 sq mi (1.04 km^{2})	840.00/sq mi (324.33/km^{2})
Palmer	Marquette	Richmond	378	418	−9.57%	0.59 sq mi (1.53 km^{2})	640.68/sq mi (247.37/km^{2})
Palo	Ionia	Ronald	236			0.70 sq mi (1.81 km^{2})	337.14/sq mi (130.17/km^{2})
Paris	Mecosta	Green	271			0.86 sq mi (2.23 km^{2})	315.12/sq mi (121.67/km^{2})
Parkdale	Manistee	Manistee	607	704	−13.78%	1.55 sq mi (4.01 km^{2})	391.61/sq mi (151.20/km^{2})
Paw Paw Lake	Berrien	Coloma; Watervliet	3,323	3,511	−5.35%	5.13 sq mi (13.29 km^{2})	647.76/sq mi (250.10/km^{2})
Pearl Beach	St. Clair	Clay	4,698	2,829	+66.07%	4.80 sq mi (12.43 km^{2})	978.75/sq mi (377.90/km^{2})
Pelkie	Baraga	Baraga	51			1.33 sq mi (3.44 km^{2})	38.35/sq mi (14.81/km^{2})
Pilgrim	Benzie	Crystal Lake	44	11	+300.00%	0.35 sq mi (0.91 km^{2})	125.71/sq mi (48.54/km^{2})
Pittsford	Hillsdale	Jefferson; Pittsford	553			1.91 sq mi (4.95 km^{2})	289.53/sq mi (111.79/km^{2})
Ponshewaing	Emmet	Littlefield	126	69	+82.61%	0.09 sq mi (0.23 km^{2})	1,400.00/sq mi (540.54/km^{2})
Presque Isle Harbor	Presque Isle	Presque Isle	643	600	+7.17%	6.37 sq mi (16.50 km^{2})	100.94/sq mi (38.97/km^{2})
Prudenville	Roscommon	Denton	1,643	1,682	−2.32%	2.85 sq mi (7.38 km^{2})	576.49/sq mi (222.58/km^{2})
Quinnesec	Dickinson	Breitung	1,083	1,191	−9.07%	1.51 sq mi (3.91 km^{2})	717.22/sq mi (276.92/km^{2})
Ramsay	Gogebic	Bessemer	278			0.60 sq mi (1.55 km^{2})	463.33/sq mi (178.89/km^{2})
Rapid City	Kalkaska	Clearwater	1,357	1,352	+0.37%	5.41 sq mi (14.01 km^{2})	250.83/sq mi (96.85/km^{2})
Rapid River	Delta	Masonville	335			1.26 sq mi (3.26 km^{2})	265.87/sq mi (102.65/km^{2})
Republic	Marquette	Republic; Humboldt	470	569	−17.40%	3.62 sq mi (9.38 km^{2})	129.83/sq mi (50.13/km^{2})
Riverdale	Gratiot	Seville; Sumner	281			0.69 sq mi (1.79 km^{2})	407.25/sq mi (157.24/km^{2})
Robin Glen–Indiantown	Saginaw	Buena Vista	674	722	−6.65%	2.81 sq mi (7.28 km^{2})	239.86/sq mi (92.61/km^{2})
Rock	Delta	Maple Ridge	181			0.90 sq mi (2.33 km^{2})	201.11/sq mi (77.65/km^{2})
Rockland	Ontonagon	Rockland	173			0.44 sq mi (1.14 km^{2})	393.18/sq mi (151.81/km^{2})
Ruby	St. Clair	Clyde	852			3.75 sq mi (9.71 km^{2})	227.20/sq mi (87.72/km^{2})
Sand Lake	Iosco	Grant; Plainfield; Wilber	1,203	1,412	−14.80%	14.95 sq mi (38.72 km^{2})	80.47/sq mi (31.07/km^{2})
Scotts	Kalamazoo	Climax; Pavilion	187			0.24 sq mi (0.62 km^{2})	779.17/sq mi (300.84/km^{2})
Shaftsburg	Shiawassee	Woodhull	450			1.00 sq mi (2.59 km^{2})	450.00/sq mi (173.75/km^{2})
Shields	Saginaw	Thomas; James	7,035	6,587	+6.80%	7.88 sq mi (20.41 km^{2})	892.77/sq mi (344.70/km^{2})
Shorewood–Tower Hills–Harbert	Berrien	Chikaming	1,249	1,344	−7.07%	4.53 sq mi (11.73 km^{2})	275.72/sq mi (106.46/km^{2})
Skanee	Baraga	Arvon	102			4.73 sq mi (12.25 km^{2})	21.56/sq mi (8.33/km^{2})
Skidway Lake	Ogemaw	Mills	3,082	3,392	−9.14%	11.29 sq mi (29.24 km^{2})	272.98/sq mi (105.40/km^{2})
Snover	Sanilac	Moore	330	448	−26.34%	3.42 sq mi (8.86 km^{2})	96.49/sq mi (37.26/km^{2})
South Boardman	Kalkaska	Boardman	509	536	−5.04%	3.29 sq mi (8.52 km^{2})	154.71/sq mi (59.73/km^{2})
South Gull Lake	Kalamazoo	Ross	1,179	1,182	−0.25%	1.35 sq mi (3.50 km^{2})	873.33/sq mi (337.20/km^{2})
South Monroe	Monroe	Monroe	6,468	6,433	+0.54%	2.43 sq mi (6.29 km^{2})	2,661.73/sq mi (1,027.70/km^{2})
Spring Arbor	Jackson	Spring Arbor	2,916	2,881	+1.21%	2.78 sq mi (7.20 km^{2})	1,048.92/sq mi (404.99/km^{2})
St. Helen	Roscommon	Richfield	2,735	2,668	+2.51%	5.73 sq mi (14.84 km^{2})	477.31/sq mi (184.29/km^{2})
St. James	Charlevoix	St. James	145	205	−29.27%	1.03 sq mi (2.67 km^{2})	140.78/sq mi (54.35/km^{2})
Stony Point	Monroe	Frenchtown	1,784	1,724	+3.48%	1.21 sq mi (3.13 km^{2})	1,474.38/sq mi (569.26/km^{2})
Stronach	Manistee	Stronach	170	162	+4.94%	0.35 sq mi (0.91 km^{2})	485.71/sq mi (187.54/km^{2})
Temperance	Monroe	Bedford	9,188	8,517	+7.88%	4.61 sq mi (11.94 km^{2})	1,993.06/sq mi (769.52/km^{2})
Three Lakes	Baraga	Spurr	167			6.00 sq mi (15.54 km^{2})	27.83/sq mi (10.75/km^{2})
Tower	Cheboygan	Forest	248			0.54 sq mi (1.40 km^{2})	459.26/sq mi (177.32/km^{2})
Trimountain	Houghton	Adams	212			0.47 sq mi (1.22 km^{2})	451.06/sq mi (174.16/km^{2})
Trowbridge Park	Marquette	Marquette	2,287	2,176	+5.10%	1.39 sq mi (3.60 km^{2})	1,645.32/sq mi (635.26/km^{2})
Trufant	Montcalm	Maple Valley	510			0.96 sq mi (2.49 km^{2})	531.25/sq mi (205.12/km^{2})
Twin Lake	Muskegon	Dalton	2,056	1,720	+19.53%	2.88 sq mi (7.46 km^{2})	713.89/sq mi (275.63/km^{2})
Vandercook Lake	Jackson	Summit	4,579	4,721	−3.01%	4.58 sq mi (11.86 km^{2})	999.78/sq mi (386.02/km^{2})
Vineyard Lake	Jackson	Columbia; Norvell	992	980	+1.22%	2.56 sq mi (6.63 km^{2})	387.50/sq mi (149.61/km^{2})
Wacousta	Clinton	Watertown	1,532	1,440	+6.39%	8.91 sq mi (23.08 km^{2})	171.94/sq mi (66.39/km^{2})
Walloon Lake	Charlevoix	Melrose	271	290	−6.55%	1.35 sq mi (3.50 km^{2})	200.74/sq mi (77.51/km^{2})
Watersmeet	Gogebic	Watersmeet	408	428	−4.67%	9.20 sq mi (23.83 km^{2})	44.35/sq mi (17.12/km^{2})
Waverly	Eaton	Delta	23,812	23,925	−0.47%	9.10 sq mi (23.57 km^{2})	2,616.70/sq mi (1,010.31/km^{2})
Wedgewood	Wexford	Cherry Grove	227	237	−4.22%	0.62 sq mi (1.61 km^{2})	366.13/sq mi (141.36/km^{2})
Weidman	Isabella	Sherman; Nottawa	920	959	−4.07%	5.65 sq mi (14.63 km^{2})	162.83/sq mi (62.87/km^{2})
Wellston	Manistee	Norman	254	311	−18.33%	0.97 sq mi (2.51 km^{2})	261.86/sq mi (101.10/km^{2})
West Ishpeming	Marquette	Ishpeming; Tilden	2,552	2,662	−4.13%	2.96 sq mi (7.67 km^{2})	862.16/sq mi (332.88/km^{2})
West Monroe	Monroe	Monroe	3,227	3,503	−7.88%	1.25 sq mi (3.24 km^{2})	2,581.60/sq mi (996.76/km^{2})
Westwood	Kalamazoo	Kalamazoo	9,621	8,653	+11.19%	2.85 sq mi (7.38 km^{2})	3,375.79/sq mi (1,303.40/km^{2})
White Pine	Ontonagon	Carp Lake	339	474	−28.48%	5.00 sq mi (12.95 km^{2})	67.80/sq mi (26.18/km^{2})
Whitmore Lake	Washtenaw; Livingston	Northfield; Green Oak	7,584	6,423	+18.08%	4.79 sq mi (12.41 km^{2})	1,583.30/sq mi (611.31/km^{2})
Winn	Isabella	Fremont	166			0.57 sq mi (1.48 km^{2})	291.23/sq mi (112.44/km^{2})
Wolf Lake	Muskegon	Egelston	5,034	4,104	+22.66%	3.54 sq mi (9.17 km^{2})	1,422.03/sq mi (549.05/km^{2})
Woodland Beach	Monroe	Frenchtown	1,899	2,049	−7.32%	0.52 sq mi (1.35 km^{2})	3,651.92/sq mi (1,410.02/km^{2})
Zeba	Baraga	L'Anse	397	480	−17.29%	3.61 sq mi (9.35 km^{2})	109.97/sq mi (42.46/km^{2})

== See also ==
- Administrative divisions of Michigan
- List of counties in Michigan
- List of municipalities in Michigan
