= Pearl Beach, Michigan =

Pearl Beach, Michigan may refer to:

- Pearl Beach, St. Clair County, Michigan, U.S., on the St. Clair River
- Pearl Beach, Branch County, Michigan, U.S., an unincorporated community on Coldwater Lake
