= Greenland, Michigan =

- Census-designated place (CDP) & unincorporated community
- Location within Michigan Location within the United States
- Coordinates: 46°46′46″N 89°6′7″W
- Country: United States
- State: Michigan
- County: Ontonagon
- Township: Greenland

Area
  - Total: 0.41 sq mi (1.07 km^{2})
  - Land: 0.41 sq mi (1.07 km^{2})
  - Water: 0 sq mi (0.00 km^{2})
- Elevation: 1,138 ft (347 m)

Population (2020)
  - Total: 146
  - Density: 354.1/sq mi (136.72/km^{2})
- Time zone: UTC-5 (Eastern (EST))
  - Summer (DST): UTC-4 (EDT)
- ZIP Codes: 49929 (Greenland); 49948 (Mass City)
- Area code: 906
- FIPS code: 26-34980
- GNIS feature ID: 2806351

Greenland is an unincorporated community and census-designated place (CDP) in Greenland Township, Ontonagon County, Michigan, United States. It is 1 mile (1.6 km) north of Mass City. State highway M-38 forms the northern edge of the community, leading northwest 11 miles (18 km) to Ontonagon, the county seat, and east 30 miles (48 km) to Baraga.

As of the 2020 census, Greenland had a population of 146.

Greenland was first listed as a CDP prior to the 2020 census.

== History ==
The community of Greenland began in Section 26 of Greenland Township.

== Climate ==
Climate data for Greenland 6N, Michigan, 1991–2020 normals, 2012-2022 snowfall: 791ft (241m)
Month	Jan	Feb	Mar	Apr	May	Jun	Jul	Aug	Sep	Oct	Nov	Dec	Year
Mean daily maximum °F (°C)	25.3 (−3.7)	27.5 (−2.5)	37.6 (3.1)	48.8 (9.3)	62.8 (17.1)	72.2 (22.3)	75.9 (24.4)	74.3 (23.5)	66.9 (19.4)	53.4 (11.9)	40.0 (4.4)	29.4 (−1.4)	51.2 (10.7)
Daily mean °F (°C)	18.8 (−7.3)	19.5 (−6.9)	27.5 (−2.5)	38.6 (3.7)	50.9 (10.5)	59.8 (15.4)	64.2 (17.9)	62.8 (17.1)	56.1 (13.4)	44.5 (6.9)	33.2 (0.7)	23.6 (−4.7)	41.6 (5.4)
Mean daily minimum °F (°C)	12.2 (−11.0)	11.6 (−11.3)	17.5 (−8.1)	28.4 (−2.0)	39.1 (3.9)	47.5 (8.6)	52.4 (11.3)	51.2 (10.7)	45.4 (7.4)	35.7 (2.1)	26.3 (−3.2)	17.9 (−7.8)	32.1 (0.1)
Average precipitation inches (mm)	2.64 (67)	1.68 (43)	1.81 (46)	2.92 (74)	3.41 (87)	3.44 (87)	3.34 (85)	3.21 (82)	3.81 (97)	3.58 (91)	3.00 (76)	2.77 (70)	35.61 (905)
Average snowfall inches (cm)	47.6 (121)	36.6 (93)	12.4 (31)	11.7 (30)	0.4 (1.0)	0.0 (0.0)	0.0 (0.0)	0.0 (0.0)	trace	2.1 (5.3)	20.2 (51)	43.2 (110)	174.2 (442.3)
Source 1: NOAA
Source 2: XMACIS (snowfall)

== Demographics ==
Historical population
Census	Pop.	Note	%±
2020	146		—
U.S. Decennial Census
