= Colony Tower Complex =

- U.S. National Register of Historic Places
- Michigan State Historic Site
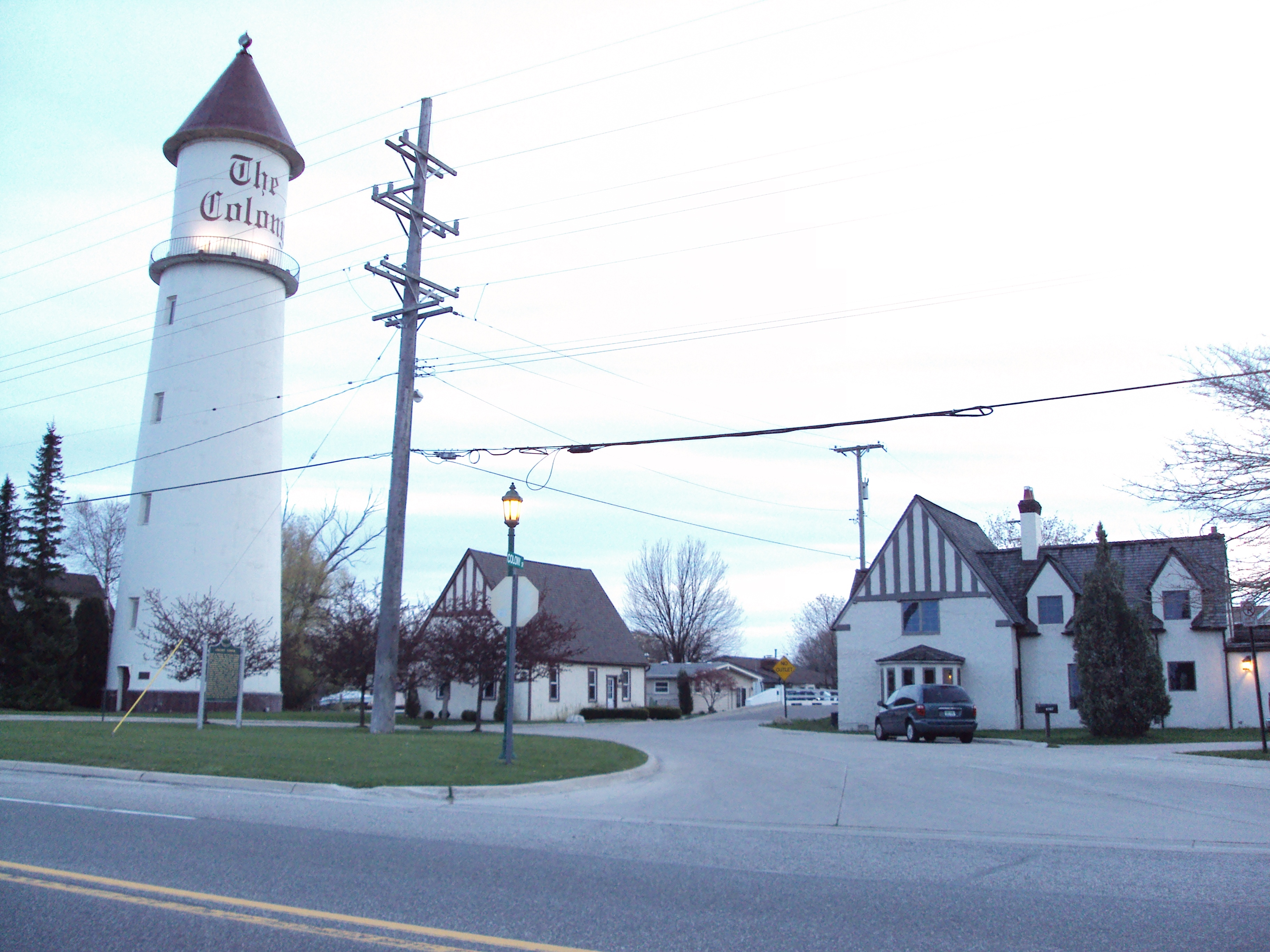
- Interactive map
- Location: 6503 Dyke Rd. (M-29), Pearl Beach, Michigan
- Coordinates: 42°37′56″N 82°36′57″W
- Area: less than one acre
- Built: 1926
- Built by: Chicago Bridge & Iron Company
- Architectural style: Tudor Revival
- NRHP reference No.: 94000756 (original); 95000876 (increase)

Significant dates
- Added to NRHP: July 22, 1994
- Boundary increase: July 21, 1995

The Colony Tower Complex is a decorative water tower, with a gate and gatehouse, located at 6503 Dyke Rd. (M-29) in Pearl Beach, Michigan. The tower was listed on the National Register of Historic Places in 1994, and the gatehouse joined it in 1995.

== History ==
In early 1926, Detroit developer Will St. John platted an exclusive residential subdivision known as "The Colony," marketed to well-off professionals as a secluded neighborhood with ready access the Lake Saint Clair. The subdivision had 147 lots. That same year, St. John had the Chicago Bridge & Iron Company erect a water tower to service the subdivision. As an advertising gimmick, St. John clad the tower with a lighthouse-like outer skin, even adding a beacon on top. He also constructed a gatehouse nearby.

However, by 1929, only three of the subdivision's lots had houses on them, one of which was St. John's own house. The onset of the Great Depression doomed the development, although years later the area did become attractive as a residential center.

== Description ==
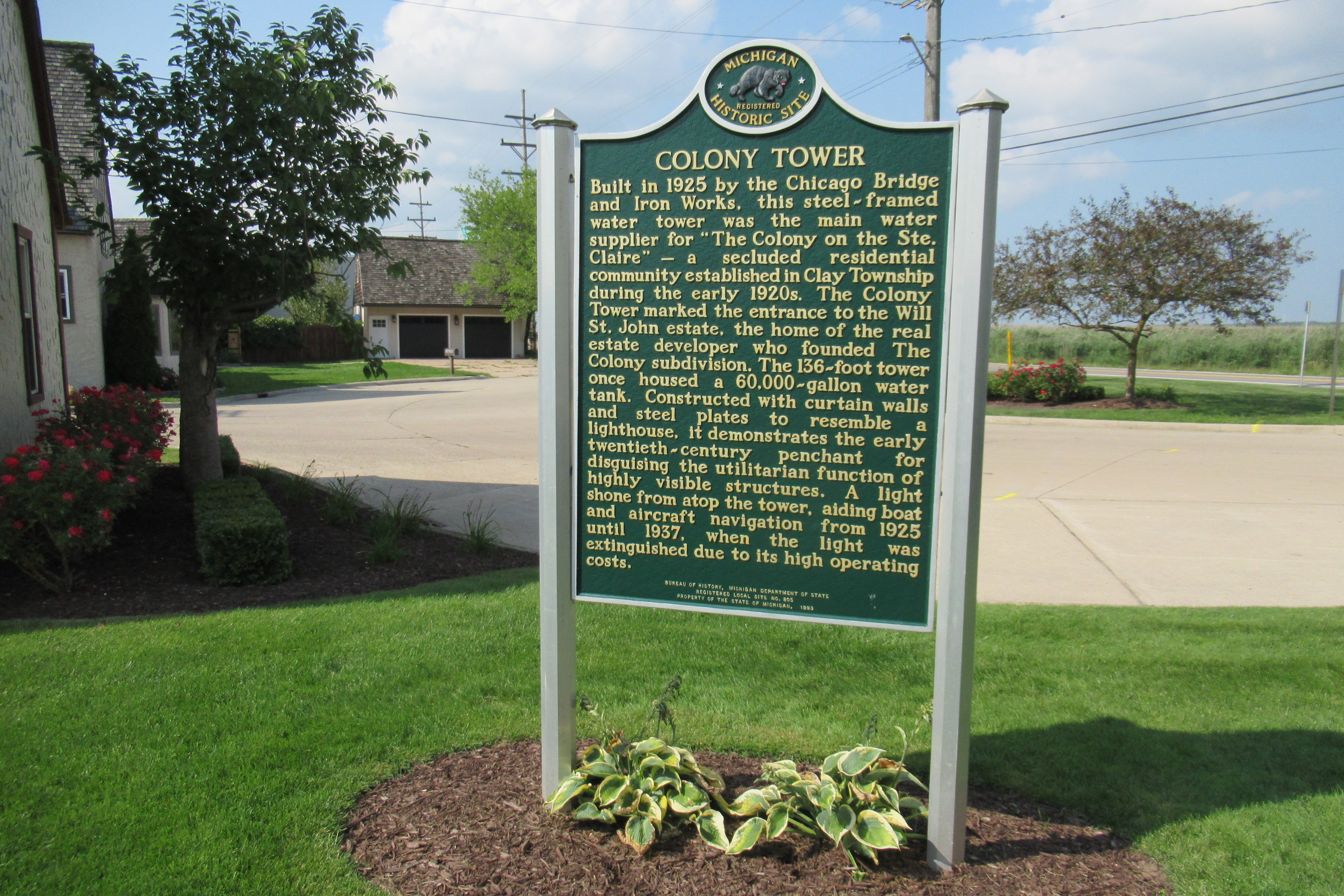
Michigan state historic marker

The Colony Tower Complex consists of a water tank tower designed to look like a lighthouse and the nearby gatekeeper's cottage and garage. A semicircular drive off Dyke leads to a narrow lane which passes between the cottage and garage, then over the small canal behind the Tower complex.

The water tower is 136 feet (41 m) tall and is clad with a steel plate, mimicking the appearance of a lighthouse. The tower served as an active lighthouse until 1937. The tower is 28 feet (8.5 m) in diameter at the base, narrowing slightly toward the top. "The Colony" is written on the outside. The cladding has deep-set windows, a catwalk, and a conical roof. Inside the cladding is a 60,000-gallon steel water tank, supported with six columns with struts and tie rods.

The nearby gatekeeper's cottage and garage buildings are Tudor Revival structures with high gabled roofs, white stuccoed walls, and half-timbering in the gables. The gatehouse has another low, gable-roof garage built in 1970 attached to the end.
