= Sand Lake, Iosco County, Michigan =

Sand Lake, Michigan
- Census-designated place (CDP) & unincorporated community
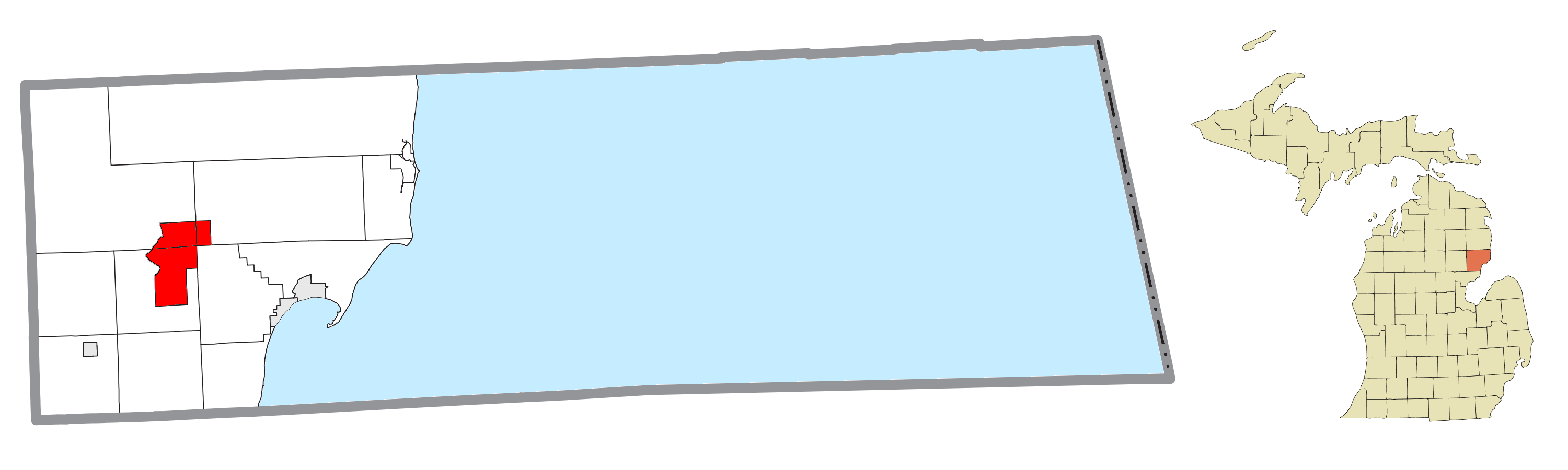
- Location within Iosco County

- Location within the state of Michigan Location within the United States
- Coordinates: 44°19′44″N 83°39′57″W
- Country: United States
- State: Michigan
- County: Iosco
- Townships: Grant, Plainfield, and Wilber

Area
  - Total: 16.22 sq mi (42.0 km^{2})
  - Land: 14.95 sq mi (38.7 km^{2})
  - Water: 1.27 sq mi (3.3 km^{2})

Population (2020)
  - Total: 1,418
  - Density: 94.45/sq mi (36.47/km^{2})
- Time zone: UTC-5 (Eastern (EST))
  - Summer (DST): UTC-4 (EDT)
- ZIP code(s): 48748 (National City); 48763 (Tawas City)
- Area code: 989
- GNIS feature ID: 2628671

Sand Lake is an unincorporated community and census-designated place (CDP) in Iosco County in the U.S. state of Michigan. The CDP had a population of 1,418 at the 2020 census. The CDP occupies portions of Grant Township, Plainfield Township, and Wilber Township.

== Geography ==
According to the United States Census Bureau, the CDP has a total area of 16.22 square miles (42.0 km^{2}), of which, 14.95 square miles (38.7 km^{2}) is land and 1.27 square miles (3.3 km^{2}) is water. The CDP encompasses multiple lakes, including Bass Lake, Chappell Lake, Floyd Lake, Indian Lake, Island Lake, Little Island Lake, Round Lake, and Sand Lake.
