= Deerfield Township, Lapeer County, Michigan =

Deerfield Township, Michigan
- Civil township
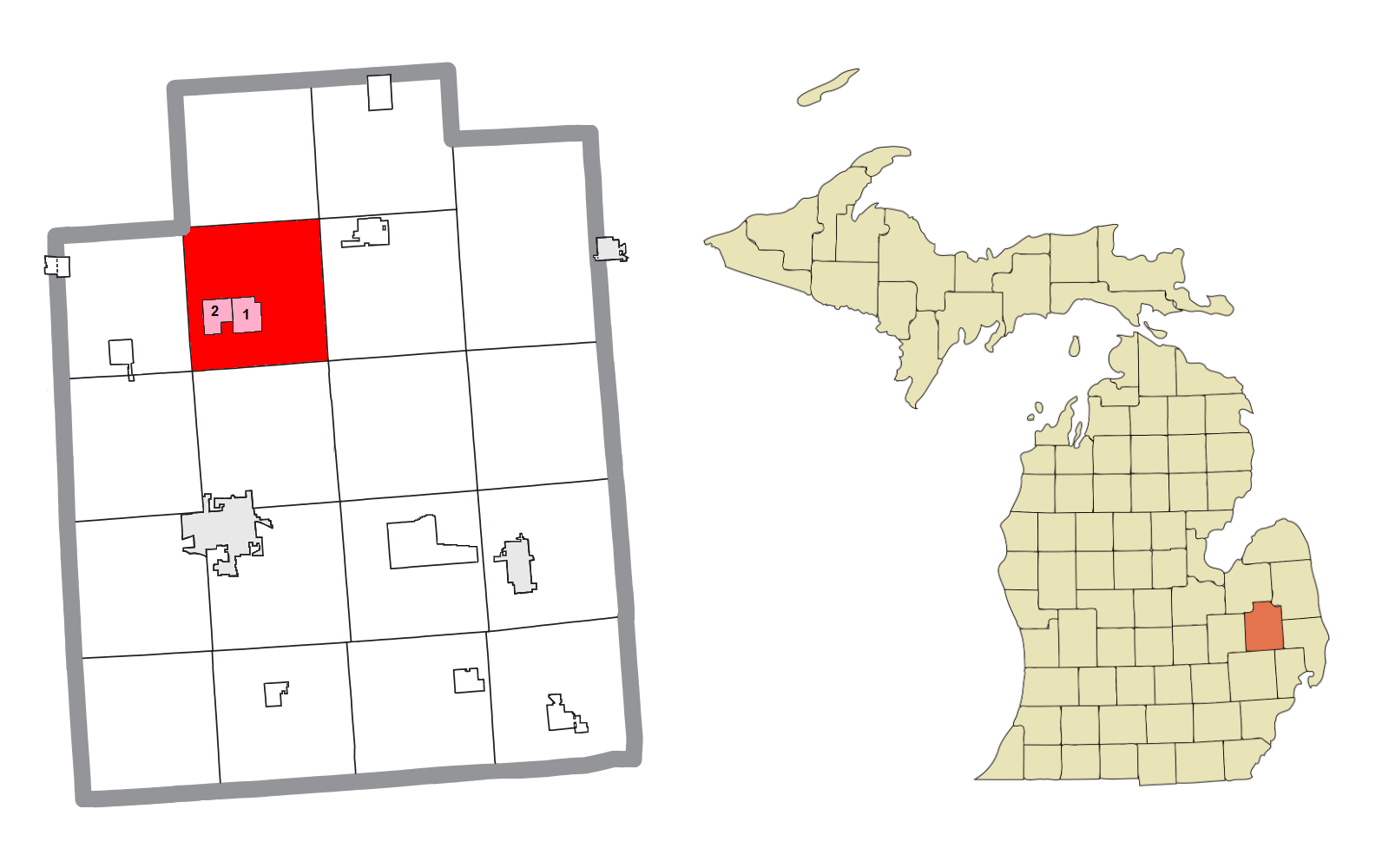
- Location within Lapeer County and the administered CDPs of Barnes Lake (1) and Millers Lake (2)

- Location within the state of Michigan Location within the United States
- Coordinates: 43°11′04″N 83°17′37″W
- Country: United States
- State: Michigan
- County: Lapeer

Area
  - Total: 36.4 sq mi (94.2 km^{2})
  - Land: 35.9 sq mi (92.9 km^{2})
  - Water: 0.50 sq mi (1.3 km^{2})
- Elevation: 840 ft (256 m)

Population (2020)
  - Total: 5,764
  - Density: 161/sq mi (62.0/km^{2})
- Time zone: UTC-5 (Eastern (EST))
  - Summer (DST): UTC-4 (EDT)
- FIPS code: 26-21160
- GNIS feature ID: 1626169
- Website: www.deerfieldtownship.com

Deerfield Township is a civil township of Lapeer County in the U.S. state of Michigan. The population was 5,764 at the 2020 Census.

There are no municipalities within the township, but Barnes Lake-Millers Lake is a census-designated place for statistical purposes. M-24 crosses the township north–south, with the city of Lapeer about nine miles south of the center of the township. M-90 branches east off M-24 in the north of the township, with the village of North Branch about five miles to the east.

This township was organized in 1855.

== Communities ==
- Barnes Lake is a census-designated place in the southwest quadrant of the township.
- Elm Creek was the name of a township here from 1873 until 1875.
- Millers Lake is a census-designated place adjacent to Barnes Lake, to the west.

== Geography ==
According to the United States Census Bureau, the township has a total area of 36.4 square miles (94 km^{2}), of which 35.9 square miles (93 km^{2}) is land and 0.5 square miles (1.3 km^{2}) (1.35%) is water.

== Demographics ==
As of the census of 2000, there were 5,736 people, 1,919 households, and 1,596 families residing in the township. The population density was 159.9 inhabitants per square mile (61.7/km^{2}). There were 2,186 housing units at an average density of 60.9 units per square mile (23.5 units/km^{2}). The racial makeup of the township was 97.05% White, 0.14% African American, 0.24% Native American, 0.21% Asian, 0.02% Pacific Islander, 0.80% from other races, and 1.53% from two or more races. Hispanic or Latino of any race were 2.20% of the population.

There were 1,919 households, out of which 44.0% had children under the age of 18 living with them, 70.3% were married couples living together, 7.8% had a female householder with no husband present, and 16.8% were non-families. 13.4% of all households were made up of individuals, and 4.7% had someone living alone who was 65 years of age or older. The average household size was 2.99 and the average family size was 3.26.

In the township the population was spread out, with 31.2% under the age of 18, 8.2% from 18 to 24, 31.0% from 25 to 44, 23.1% from 45 to 64, and 6.6% who were 65 years of age or older. The median age was 34 years. For every 100 females, there were 101.6 males. For every 100 females age 18 and over, there were 100.4 males.

The median income for a household in the township was $47,804, and the median income for a family was $51,650. Males had a median income of $40,633 versus $21,439 for females. The per capita income for the township was $19,609. About 1.8% of families and 3.9% of the population were below the poverty line, including 2.3% of those under age 18 and 7.4% of those age 65 or over.
