= Millers Lake, Michigan =

- Census-designated place (CDP) & unincorporated community
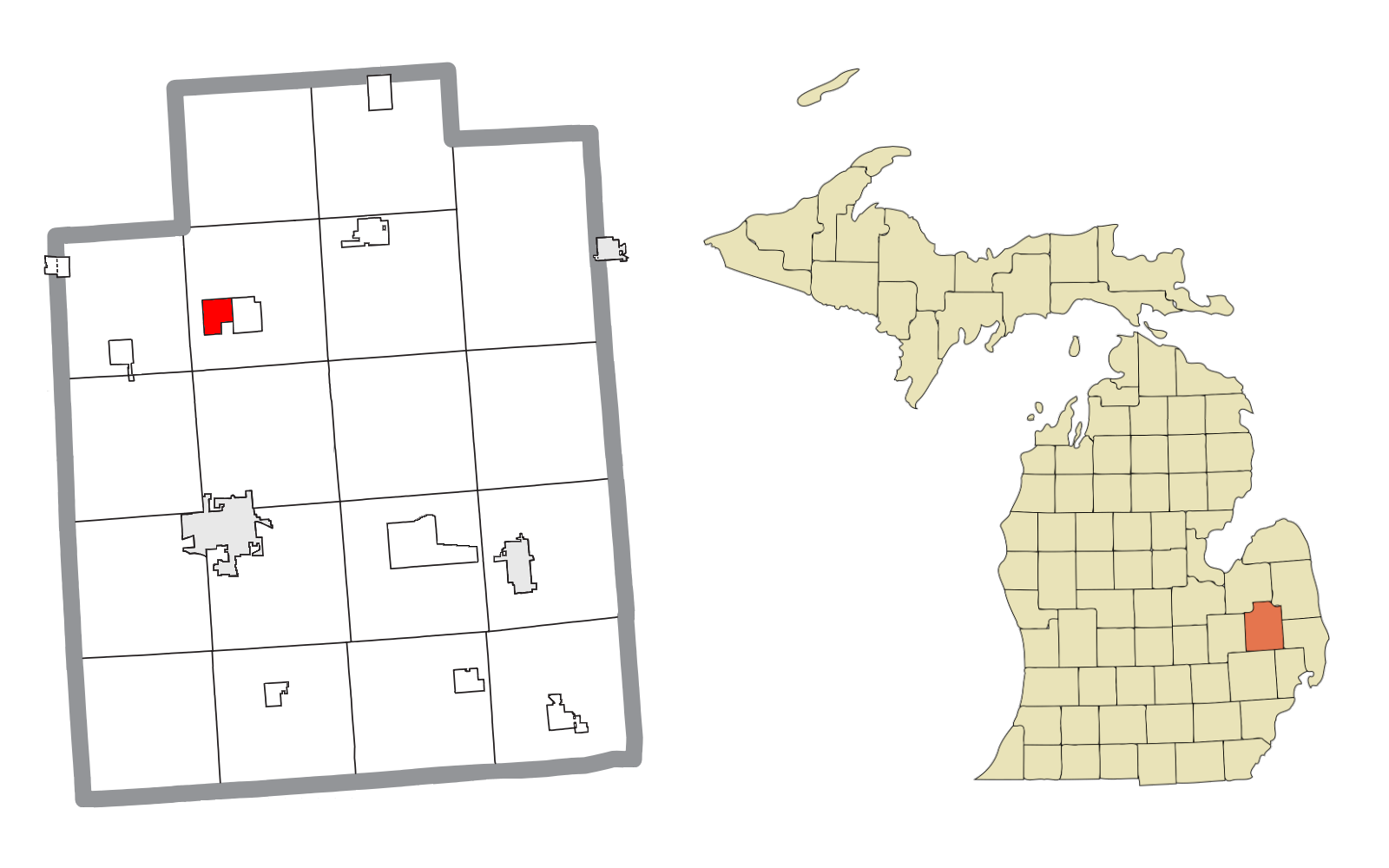
- Location within Lapeer County

- Location within the state of Michigan Location within the United States
- Coordinates: 43°10′46″N 83°19′26″W
- Country: United States
- State: Michigan
- County: Lapeer
- Township: Deerfield

Area
  - Total: 1.63 sq mi (4.23 km^{2})
  - Land: 1.51 sq mi (3.91 km^{2})
  - Water: 0.12 sq mi (0.32 km^{2})
- Elevation: 805 ft (245 m)

Population (2020)
  - Total: 311
  - Density: 206.0/sq mi (79.55/km^{2})
- Time zone: UTC-5 (Eastern (EST))
  - Summer (DST): UTC-4 (EDT)
- ZIP code(s): 48421 (Columbiaville)
- Area code: 810
- FIPS code: 26-54132
- GNIS feature ID: 2804671

Millers Lake is a census-designated place (CDP) in the northwest part of Deerfield Township, Lapeer County, Michigan, United States, surrounding a lake of the same name. It is bordered to the east by the CDP of Barnes Lake. M-24 forms the border between the two CDPs; the state highway leads north 12 miles (19 km) to Mayville and south 9 miles (14 km) to Lapeer.

As of the 2020 census, Millers Lake had a population of 311.

Millers Lake was first listed as a CDP prior to the 2020 census. Previously, the community was part of the Barnes Lake-Millers Lake CDP.

== Demographics ==
Historical population
Census	Pop.	Note	%±
2020	311		—
U.S. Decennial Census
