= Wilber Township, Michigan =

- Civil township
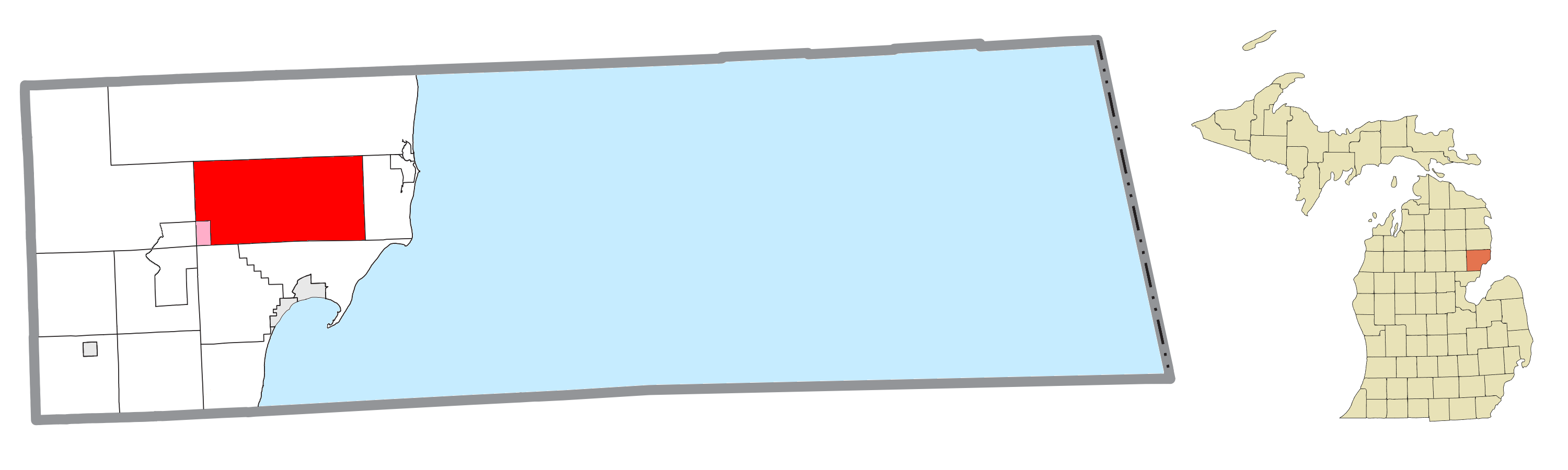
- Location within Iosco County (red) and an administered portion of the Sand Lake CDP (pink)

- Location within the state of Michigan Location within the United States
- Coordinates: 44°22′49″N 83°33′21″W
- Country: United States
- State: Michigan
- County: Iosco

Area
  - Total: 72.7 sq mi (188.3 km^{2})
  - Land: 72.5 sq mi (187.7 km^{2})
  - Water: 0.19 sq mi (0.5 km^{2})
- Elevation: 692 ft (211 m)

Population (2020)
  - Total: 720
  - Density: 9.9/sq mi (3.8/km^{2})
- Time zone: UTC-5 (Eastern (EST))
  - Summer (DST): UTC-4 (EDT)
- Area code: 989
- FIPS code: 26-87180
- GNIS feature ID: 1627271
- Website: https://wilbertwpmi.gov/

Wilber Township is a civil township of Iosco County in the U.S. state of Michigan. The population was 720 at the 2020 census. A portion of the census-designated place of Sand Lake is located within the township.

== Geography ==
According to the United States Census Bureau, the township has a total area of 72.7 square miles (188 km^{2}), of which 72.5 square miles (188 km^{2}) is land and 0.2 square miles (0.52 km^{2}) (0.29%) is water.

== Demographics ==
As of the census of 2000, there were 740 people, 305 households, and 233 families residing in the township. The population density was 10.2 per square mile (3.9/km^{2}). There were 616 housing units at an average density of 8.5 per square mile (3.3/km^{2}). The racial makeup of the township was 97.57% White, 0.14% African American, 0.27% Native American, 0.81% Asian, 0.54% from other races, and 0.68% from two or more races. Hispanic or Latino of any race were 1.35% of the population.

There were 305 households, out of which 24.9% had children under the age of 18 living with them, 70.5% were married couples living together, 3.9% had a female householder with no husband present, and 23.3% were non-families. 20.0% of all households were made up of individuals, and 8.5% had someone living alone who was 65 years of age or older. The average household size was 2.43 and the average family size was 2.76.

In the township the population was spread out, with 21.9% under the age of 18, 3.9% from 18 to 24, 25.8% from 25 to 44, 32.0% from 45 to 64, and 16.4% who were 65 years of age or older. The median age was 44 years. For every 100 females, there were 100.5 males. For every 100 females age 18 and over, there were 107.9 males.

The median income for a household in the township was $36,786, and the median income for a family was $39,485. Males had a median income of $30,833 versus $19,583 for females. The per capita income for the township was $18,224. About 8.2% of families and 9.4% of the population were below the poverty line, including 8.1% of those under age 18 and 11.6% of those age 65 or over.
