= Lake Gogebic, Michigan =

- Census-designated place (CDP) & unincorporated community
- Location within Michigan Location within the United States
- Coordinates: 46°34′31″N 89°37′19″W
- Country: United States
- State: Michigan
- County: Ontonagon
- Township: Bergland

Area
  - Total: 1.80 sq mi (4.66 km^{2})
  - Land: 1.08 sq mi (2.80 km^{2})
  - Water: 0.72 sq mi (1.86 km^{2})
- Elevation: 1,319 ft (402 m)

Population (2020)
  - Total: 122
  - Density: 112.7/sq mi (43.51/km^{2})
- Time zone: UTC-5 (Eastern (EST))
  - Summer (DST): UTC-4 (EDT)
- ZIP Code: 49910 (Bergland); 49947 (Marenisco)
- Area code: 906
- FIPS code: 26-44620
- GNIS feature ID: 2806352

Lake Gogebic is a census-designated place (CDP) in Bergland Township, Ontonagon County, Michigan, United States. As of the 2020 census, Lake Gogebic had a population of 122. It is situated on the north shore of Lake Gogebic, the largest natural inland lake on the Upper Peninsula of Michigan. The CDP includes the unincorporated communities of Lake Gogebic and Merriweather, and it is bordered to the east by the community of Bergland.

The northern edge of the CDP follows highway M-28, which leads east 22 miles (35 km) to Bruce Crossing and southwest 17 miles (27 km) to Wakefield.

Lake Gogebic was first listed as a CDP prior to the 2020 census.

== Demographics ==
Historical population
Census	Pop.	Note	%±
2020	122		—
U.S. Decennial Census
