= Barnes Lake-Millers Lake, Michigan =

- Unincorporated community & former census-designated place (CDP)
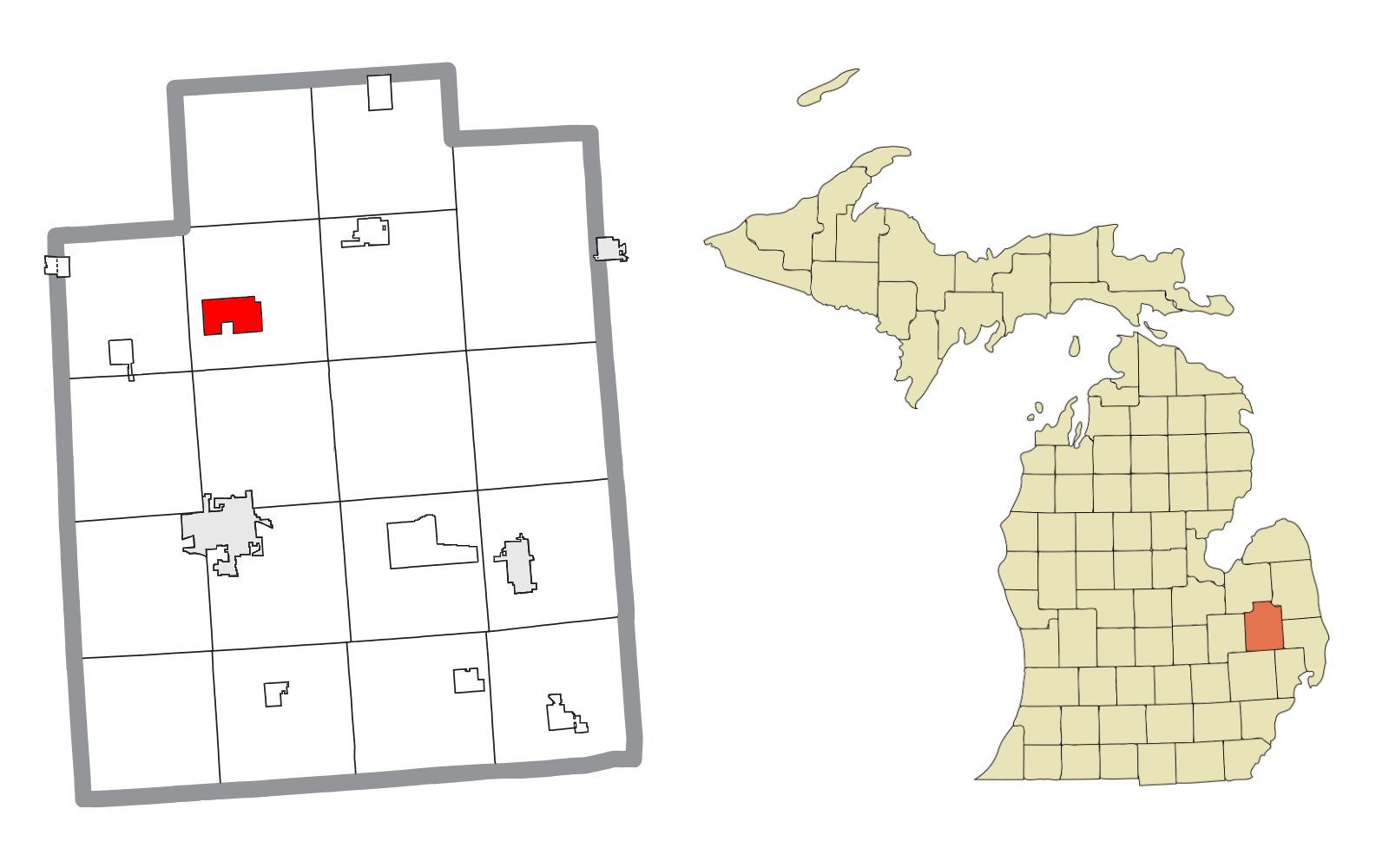
- Former location within Lapeer County

- Location within the state of Michigan Location within the United States
- Coordinates: 43°10′46″N 83°18′44″W
- Country: United States
- State: Michigan
- County: Lapeer
- Township: Deerfield

Area
  - Total: 3.46 sq mi (8.96 km^{2})
  - Land: 3.06 sq mi (7.92 km^{2})
  - Water: 0.40 sq mi (1.04 km^{2})
- Elevation: 784 ft (239 m)

Population (2010)
  - Total: 1,093
  - Density: 357.19/sq mi (137.91/km^{2})
- Time zone: UTC-5 (Eastern (EST))
  - Summer (DST): UTC-4 (EDT)
- FIPS code: 26-05470
- GNIS feature ID: 2393327

Barnes Lake-Millers Lake was a census-designated place (CDP) in Lapeer County in the U.S. state of Michigan. The CDP was used for statistical purposes and had no legal status as a municipality. The population was 1,093 at the 2010 census. Prior to the 2020 census, the CDP was split into two CDPs: Barnes Lake and Millers Lake. The CDP was located within Deerfield Township

The CDP was centered on two small lakes in north-central Lapeer County: Barnes Lake (43°11′04″N 83°18′03″W) and Millers Lake (43°10′45″N 83°19′15″W). M-24 runs between the lakes, with Barnes Lake on the east and Millers Lake on the west. Both lakes drain into the Flint River, which is about one mile (1.6 km) to the north. The village of Columbiaville is about 5 miles (8 km) west-southwest. The city of Lapeer is about 9 miles (14 km) south.

== Geography ==
According to the United States Census Bureau, the CDP had a total area of 3.4 square miles (8.8 km^{2}), of which 3.1 square miles (8.0 km^{2}) were land and 0.4 square miles (1.0 km^{2}) (11.05%) were water.

== Demographics ==
As of the census of 2000, there were 1,187 people, 454 households, and 345 families residing in the CDP. The population density was 387.4 inhabitants per square mile (149.6/km^{2}). There were 641 housing units at an average density of 209.2 per square mile (80.8/km^{2}). The racial makeup of the CDP was 96.55% White, 0.25% African American, 0.42% Native American, 0.25% Asian, 1.18% from other races, and 1.35% from two or more races. Hispanic or Latino of any race were 2.61% of the population.

There were 454 households, out of which 32.4% had children under the age of 18 living with them, 65.2% were married couples living together, 8.4% had a female householder with no husband present, and 23.8% were non-families. 18.9% of all households were made up of individuals, and 8.1% had someone living alone who was 65 years of age or older. The average household size was 2.61 and the average family size was 3.00.

In the CDP, the population was spread out, with 25.0% under the age of 18, 8.1% from 18 to 24, 28.4% from 25 to 44, 27.7% from 45 to 64, and 10.8% who were 65 years of age or older. The median age was 38 years. For every 100 females, there were 102.6 males. For every 100 females age 18 and over, there were 100.0 males.

The median income for a household in the CDP was $48,889, and the median income for a family was $59,514. Males had a median income of $39,375 versus $25,000 for females. The per capita income for the CDP was $22,103. None of the families and 2.5% of the population were living below the poverty line, including no under eighteens and none of those over 64.
