= Greenland Township, Michigan =

- Civil township
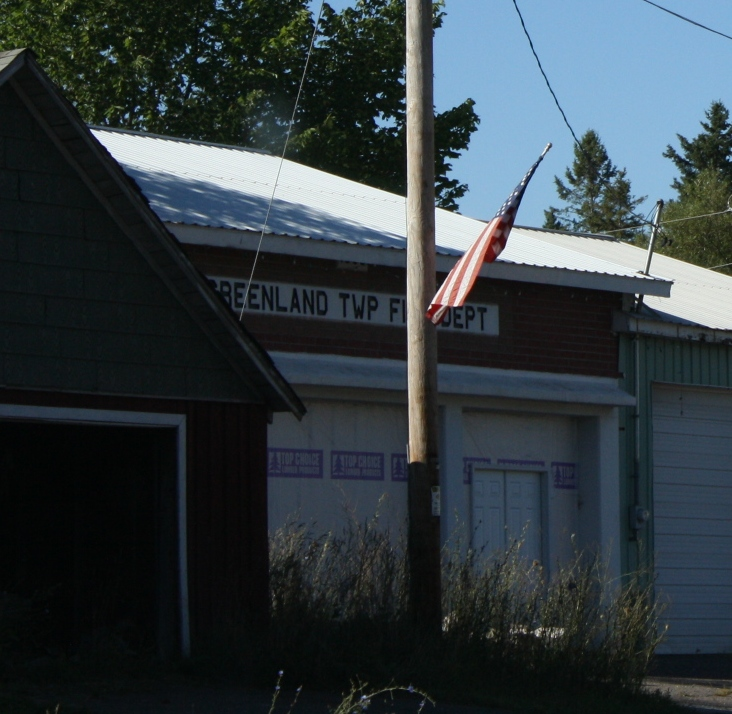
- Greenland Township Fire Station

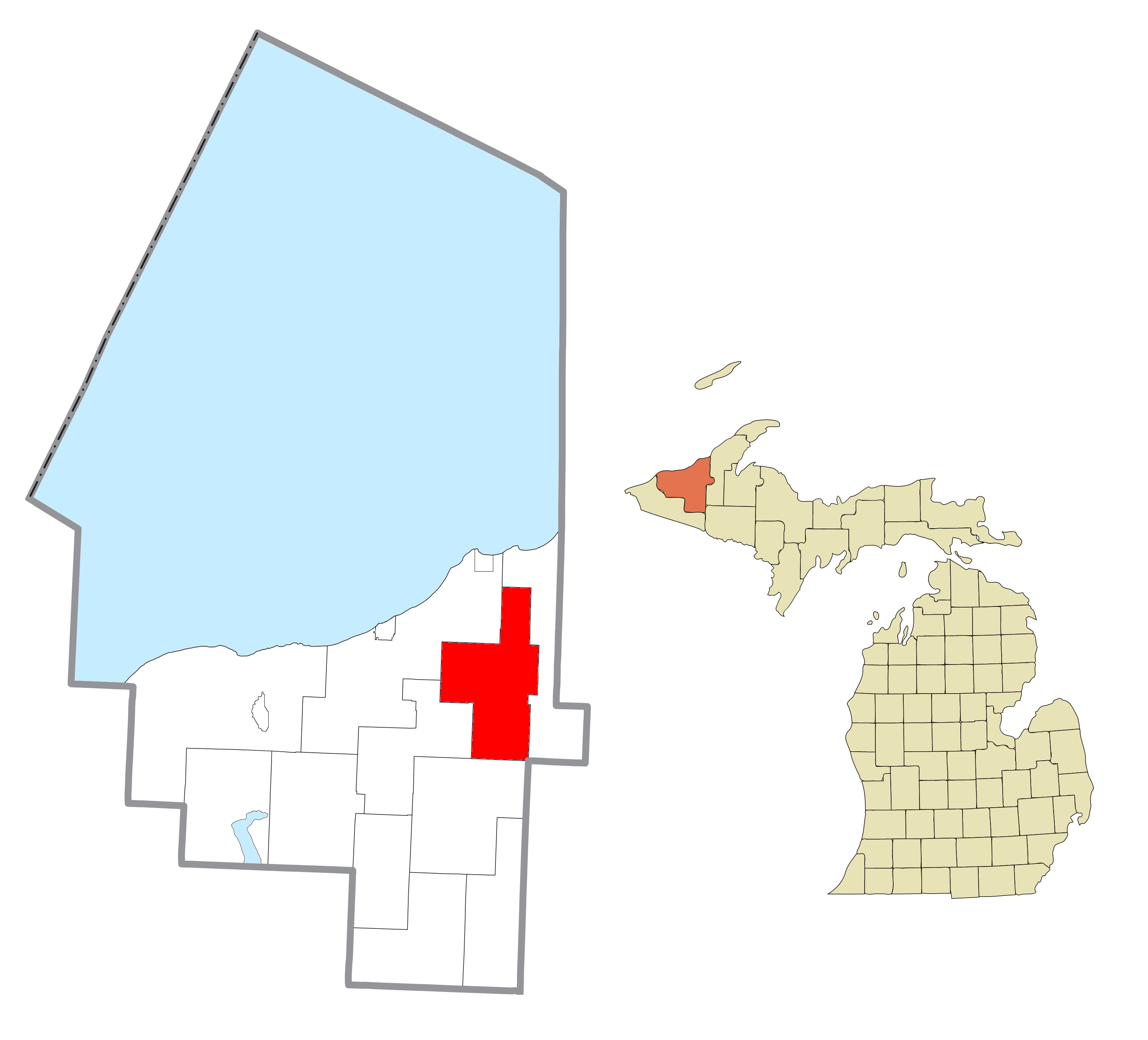
- Location within Ontonagon County

- Location within the state of Michigan Greenland Township (the United States)
- Coordinates: 46°46′38″N 89°3′41″W
- Country: United States
- State: Michigan
- County: Ontonagon

Government
  - Supervisor: Fred Barron
  - Clerk: Corrie Kaarto

Area
  - Total: 113.19 sq mi (293.2 km^{2})
  - Land: 113.19 sq mi (293.2 km^{2})
  - Water: 0.0 sq mi (0 km^{2})
- Elevation: 920 ft (280 m)

Population (2020)
  - Total: 628
  - Density: 7/sq mi (2.7/km^{2})
- Time zone: UTC-5 (Eastern (EST))
  - Summer (DST): UTC-4 (EDT)
- ZIP code(s): 49929 (Greenland); 49948 (Mass City); 49953 (Ontonagon); 49965 (Toivola)
- Area code: 906
- FIPS code: 26-35000
- GNIS feature ID: 1626398

Greenland Township is a civil township of Ontonagon County in the U.S. state of Michigan. The population was 628 at the 2020 census.

== History ==
Michigan and the entire old Northwest Territory were gridded into 36 square mile geographic townships. Due to the mountainous terrain and low population density, both the counties and their political subdivisional townships in Michigan's Upper Peninsula were defined in order to keep communities connected to their county seats. Greenland Township is irregularly shaped and three times the size of a geographic township, containing the source streams for a number of rivers, so it was not difficult in early days to ford streams within the township.

In the 1920s, copper mines had spur connections in Greenland Township to the Copper Range Railroad and the Chicago, Milwaukee, and St. Paul Railroad, driving population growth of the communities of Greenland (in Section 26), Lake Mine (Section 31), Mass City (Straddling sections 5, 35 and 36), McKeever (Section 9), Peppard (Section 4), Riddle Junction (DSS&A connection in Section 18) and Simar (Section 33). (The 21st century Simar landing strip is just east in Bohemia Township).

== Geography ==
According to the United States Census Bureau, the township has a total area of 113.19 square miles (293.2 km^{2}), all land.

=== Communities ===
- Greenland is an unincorporated community and census-designated place in the township.
- Maple Grove is an unincorporated community in the township.
- Mass City is an unincorporated community in the township.
- Wainola is an unincorporated community at the junction of Rousseau Road with Mud Creek Road and Post Office Road.
- Wasas is an old unincorporated community surrounding the junction of Rousseau Road and Wasas Road in the southeast of the township. The community center was the Wasas depot just south of the railroad tracks but is now considered to be at the highway intersection.

=== Climate ===
This climatic region is typified by large seasonal temperature differences, with warm to hot (and often humid) summers and cold (sometimes severely cold) winters. According to the Köppen Climate Classification system, Greenland has a humid continental climate, abbreviated "Dfb" on climate maps.
