= Saginaw Township South, Michigan =

- Unincorporated community & former census-designated place (CDP)
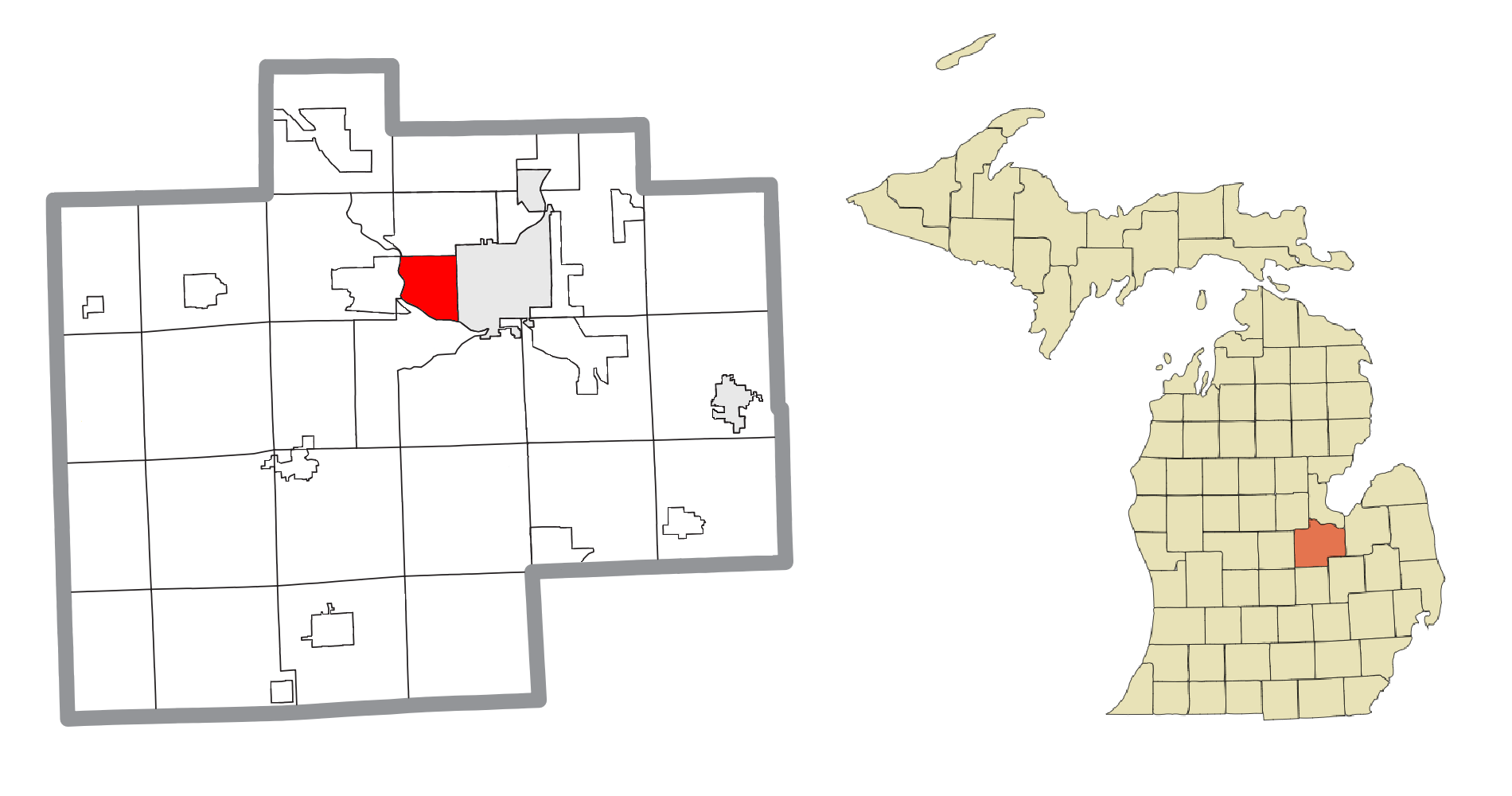
- Former CDP location within Saginaw County

- Location within the state of Michigan
- Coordinates: 43°25′02″N 84°01′09″W
- Country: United States
- State: Michigan
- County: Saginaw
- Township: Saginaw

Area
  - Total: 7.0 sq mi (18.2 km^{2})
  - Land: 6.9 sq mi (17.9 km^{2})
  - Water: 0.15 sq mi (0.4 km^{2})

Population (2000)
  - Total: 13,801
  - Density: 1,999/sq mi (771.8/km^{2})
- Time zone: UTC-5 (Eastern (EST))
  - Summer (DST): UTC-4 (EDT)
- ZIP code(s): 48603, 48604 (Saginaw)
- Area code: 989
- FIPS code: 26-70550
- GNIS feature ID: 2393219

Saginaw Township South is an unincorporated community and former census-designated place (CDP) in Saginaw County in the U.S. state of Michigan. The community is located within Saginaw Charter Township, and the CDP boundaries consisted of the southern portion of the township. Saginaw Township North is in the northern portion of the township.

The population of the Saginaw Township South CDP was 13,801 at the 2000 census. The CDP was dissolved and not included in the 2010 census.

== Geography ==
According to the United States Census Bureau, the CDP has a total area of 7.0 square miles (18 km^{2}), of which 6.9 square miles (18 km^{2}) is land and 0.1 square miles (0.26 km^{2}) (1.99%) is water.

== Demographics ==
As of the census of 2000, there were 13,801 people, 6,079 households, and 3,860 families residing in the CDP. The population density was 1,999.1 inhabitants per square mile (771.9/km^{2}). There were 6,327 housing units at an average density of 916.5 per square mile (353.9/km^{2}). The racial makeup of the CDP was 89.86% White, 5.36% Black or African American, 0.25% Native American, 1.96% Asian, 0.01% Pacific Islander, 1.26% from other races, and 1.30% from two or more races. Hispanic or Latino of any race were 4.41% of the population.

There were 6,079 households, out of which 26.0% had children under the age of 18 living with them, 52.7% were married couples living together, 8.5% had a female householder with no husband present, and 36.5% were non-families. 32.0% of all households were made up of individuals, and 15.0% had someone living alone who was 65 years of age or older. The average household size was 2.27 and the average family size was 2.88.

In the CDP, the population was spread out, with 21.8% under the age of 18, 7.6% from 18 to 24, 25.0% from 25 to 44, 26.8% from 45 to 64, and 18.8% who were 65 years of age or older. The median age was 42 years. For every 100 females, there were 90.1 males. For every 100 females age 18 and over, there were 86.8 males.

The median income for a household in the CDP was $48,605, and the median income for a family was $64,137. Males had a median income of $49,977 versus $30,968 for females. The per capita income for the CDP was $28,012. About 4.8% of families and 6.0% of the population were below the poverty line, including 6.6% of those under age 18 and 6.7% of those age 65 or over.
