= Wedgewood, Michigan =

- Census-designated place (CDP) & unincorporated community
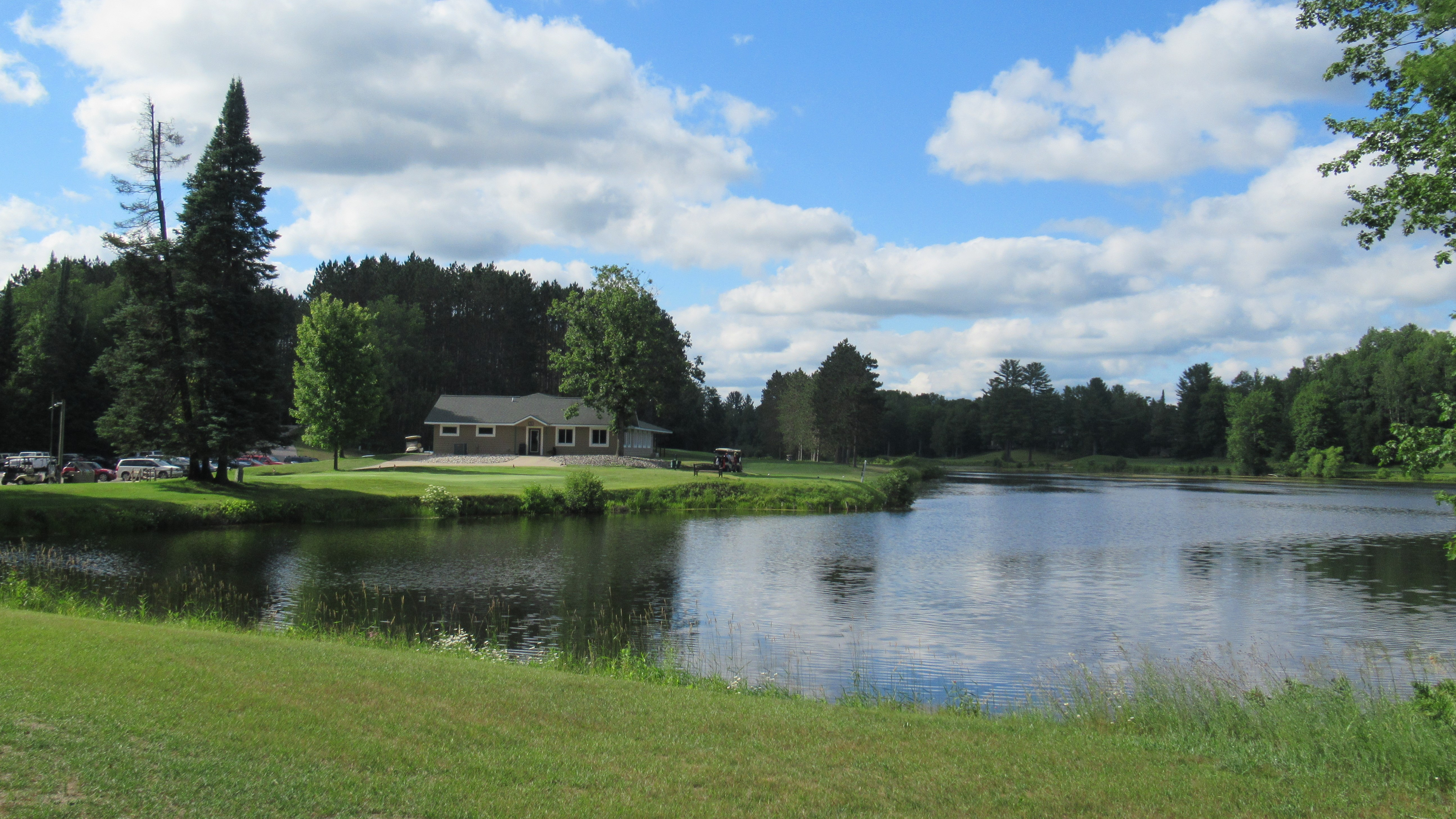
- The pond at Lakewood on the Green golf course

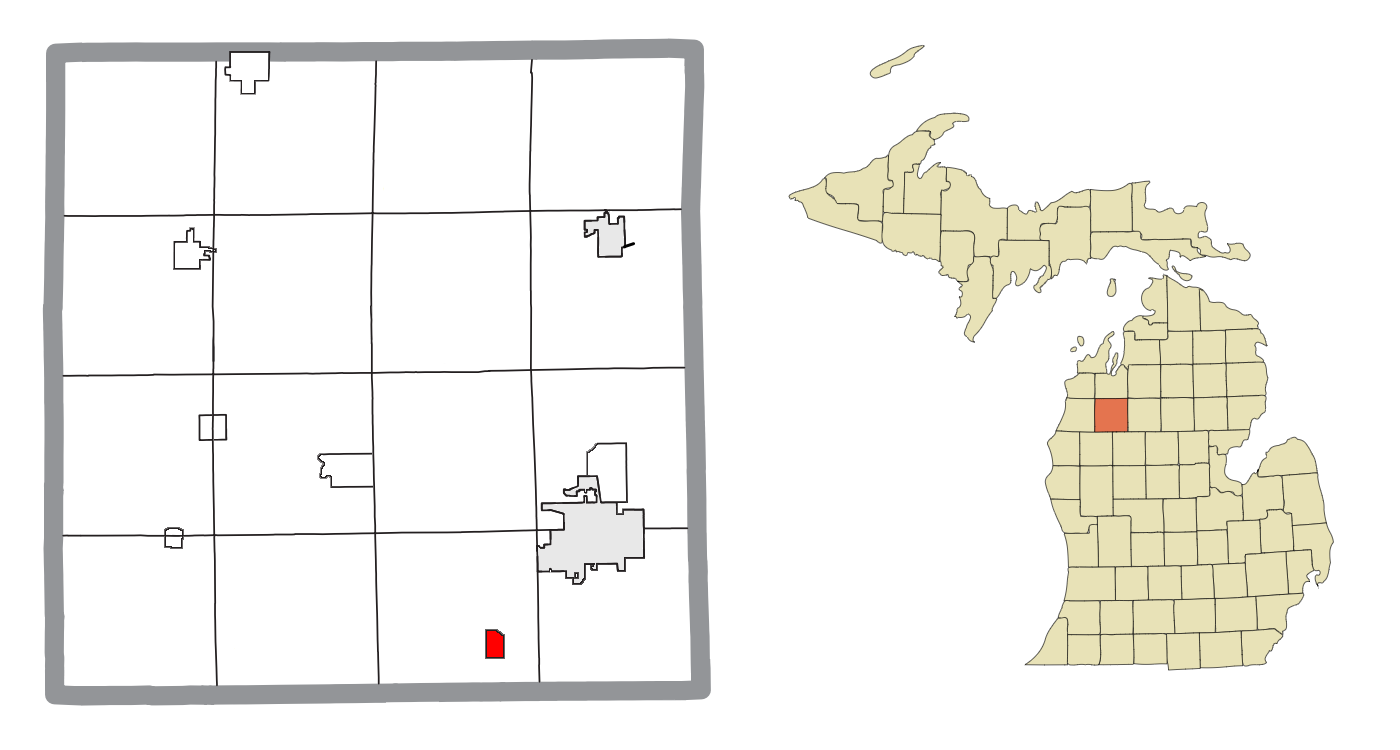
- Location within Wexford County

- Location within the state of Michigan Location within the United States
- Coordinates: 44°11′37″N 85°29′25″W
- Country: United States
- State: Michigan
- County: Wexford
- Township: Cherry Grove

Area
  - Total: 0.65 sq mi (1.69 km^{2})
  - Land: 0.62 sq mi (1.61 km^{2})
  - Water: 0.031 sq mi (0.08 km^{2})
- Elevation: 1,266 ft (386 m)

Population (2020)
  - Total: 227
  - Density: 364.2/sq mi (140.63/km^{2})
- Time zone: UTC-5 (Eastern (EST))
  - Summer (DST): UTC-4 (EDT)
- ZIP code(s): 49601 (Cadillac)
- Area code: 231
- GNIS feature ID: 2583770

Wedgewood is an unincorporated community and census-designated place (CDP) in Wexford County in the U.S. state of Michigan. The population of the CDP was 227 at the 2020 census. Wedgewood is located within Cherry Grove Township.

== History ==
The community of Wedgewood was listed as a newly-organized census-designated place for the 2010 census, meaning it then had officially defined boundaries and population statistics for the first time.

== Geography ==
According to the U.S. Census Bureau, the community has an area of 0.65 square miles (1.68 km^{2}), of which 0.62 square miles (1.61 km^{2}) is land and 0.03 square miles (0.08 km^{2}) (4.62%) is water.

== Demographics ==
As of the census of 2020, there were 227 people, 81 households, and 67 families residing in Wedgewood. The racial makeup of the CDP was 95.1% White, 0.8% from some other race, and 3.9% from two or more races. Hispanic or Latino of any race were 1.7% of the population.

The median age was 60.9 years. 49.8% of the population was 65 years or older, with 27.8% being between the ages of 65 and 74, 17% being between the ages of 75 and 84, and 5% being 85 or older. 8.3% of the population was younger than 18 years old.

Historical population
Census	Pop.	Note	%±
2010	237		—
2020	227		−4.2%
U.S. Decennial Census

== Education ==
Wedgewood is served entirely by Cadillac Area Public Schools to the northeast in the city of Cadillac.
