= Saginaw Township North, Michigan =

- Unincorporated community & former census-designated place (CDP)
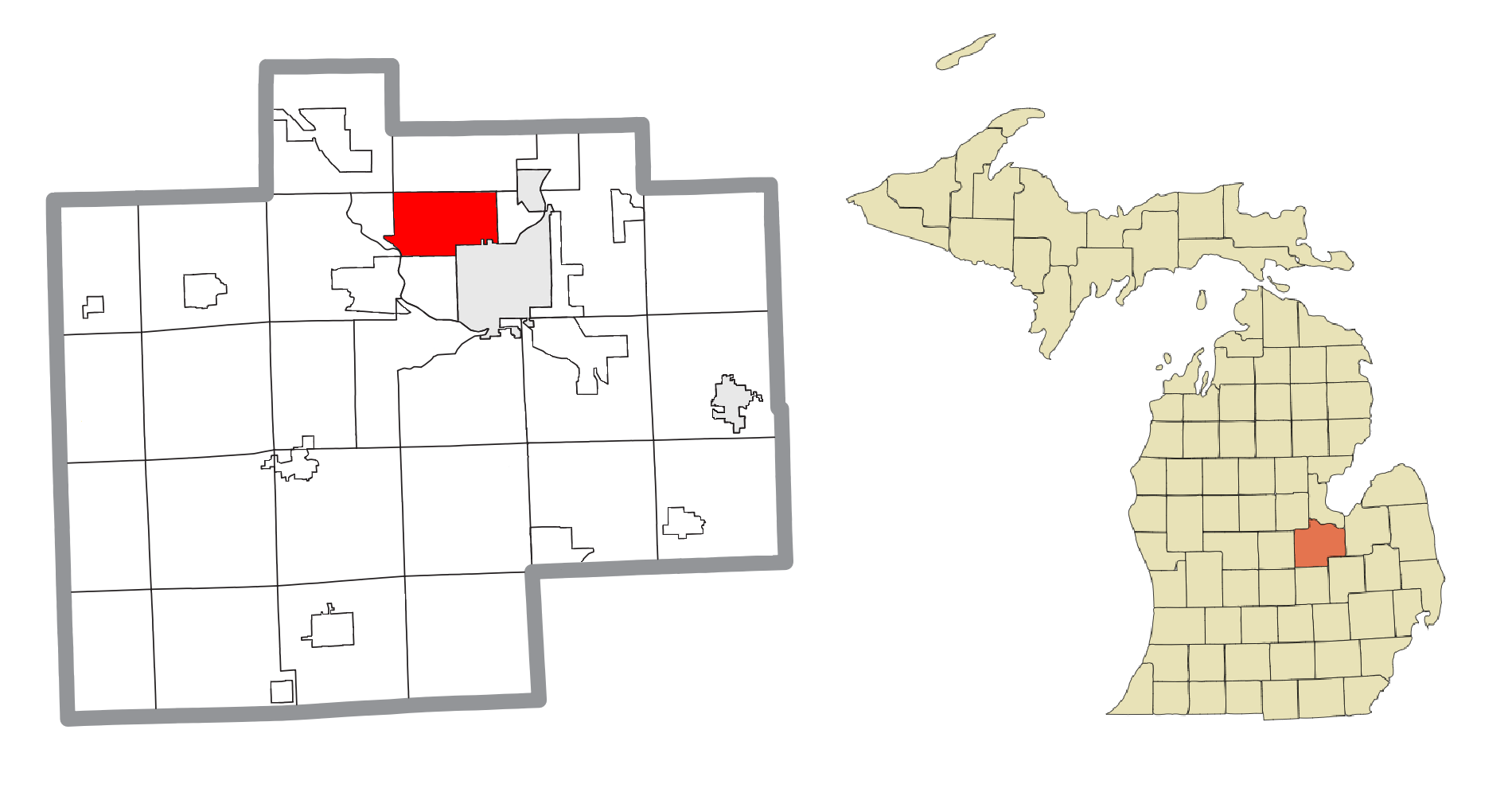
- Former CDP location within Saginaw County

- Location within the state of Michigan
- Coordinates: 43°27′36″N 84°00′24″W
- Country: United States
- State: Michigan
- County: Saginaw
- Township: Saginaw

Area
  - Total: 13.5 sq mi (35.0 km^{2})
  - Land: 13.5 sq mi (35.0 km^{2})
  - Water: 0 sq mi (0.0 km^{2})

Population (2000)
  - Total: 24,994
  - Density: 1,852/sq mi (714.9/km^{2})
- Time zone: UTC-5 (Eastern (EST))
  - Summer (DST): UTC-4 (EDT)
- ZIP code(s): 48602, 48603 (Saginaw)
- Area code: 989
- FIPS code: 26-70545
- GNIS feature ID: 2393218

Saginaw Township North is an unincorporated community and former census-designated place (CDP) in Saginaw County in the U.S. state of Michigan. The community is located within Saginaw Charter Township, and the CDP boundaries consisted of most of the northern portion of the township. Saginaw Township South is in the southern portion of the township.

The population of the Saginaw Township South CDP was 24,994 at the 2000 census. The CDP was dissolved and not included in the 2010 census.

== Communities ==
- Lawndale is an unincorporated community at the junction of Tittabawassee Road and Lawndale Road on the boundary with Kochville Township. Lawndale was a station on the Pere Marquette Railway. A post office named "Ohman" opened December 15, 1891, named for its first postmaster, William Ohman. The post office name changed to Lawndale on January 20, 1892, and closed on April 30, 1903.
- Shattuckville is an unincorporated community at M-47/Midland Road, Shattuck Road and Hospital Road. A post office named "Redan" opened in the northeastern part of Saginaw County on May 15, 1872, and was closed February 6, 1874. The office was reestablished as Shattuckville on March 6, 1877, and operated until November 20, 1878. The settlement was named for mill owner Samuel N. Shattuck, who also served as the first and only postmaster. In 1884, Shattuckville had a population of 68, an increase from 46 reported in the 1880 U.S. Census.

== Geography ==
According to the United States Census Bureau, the CDP has a total area of 13.5 square miles (35 km^{2}), all land.

== Demographics ==
As of the census of 2000, there were 24,994 people, 10,704 households, and 6,572 families residing in the CDP. The population density was 1,851.5 inhabitants per square mile (714.9/km^{2}). There were 11,209 housing units at an average density of 830.3 per square mile (320.6/km^{2}). The racial makeup of the CDP was 88.07% White, 5.35% Black or African American, 0.27% Native American, 3.08% Asian, 1.61% from other races, and 1.61% from two or more races. Hispanic or Latino of any race were 4.09% of the population.

There were 10,704 households, out of which 25.5% had children under the age of 18 living with them, 49.7% were married couples living together, 9.1% had a female householder with no husband present, and 38.6% were non-families. 32.4% of all households were made up of individuals, and 15.3% had someone living alone who was 65 years of age or older. The average household size was 2.26 and the average family size was 2.87.

In the CDP, the population was spread out, with 20.7% under the age of 18, 10.2% from 18 to 24, 24.6% from 25 to 44, 24.8% from 45 to 64, and 19.8% who were 65 years of age or older. The median age was 41 years. For every 100 females, there were 86.7 males. For every 100 females age 18 and over, there were 81.1 males.

The median income for a household in the CDP was $42,481, and the median income for a family was $56,641. Males had a median income of $47,450 versus $30,300 for females. The per capita income for the CDP was $24,466. About 4.3% of families and 7.1% of the population were below the poverty line, including 7.5% of those under age 18 and 8.9% of those age 65 or over.
