= Mass City, Michigan =

- Census-designated place (CDP) & unincorporated community
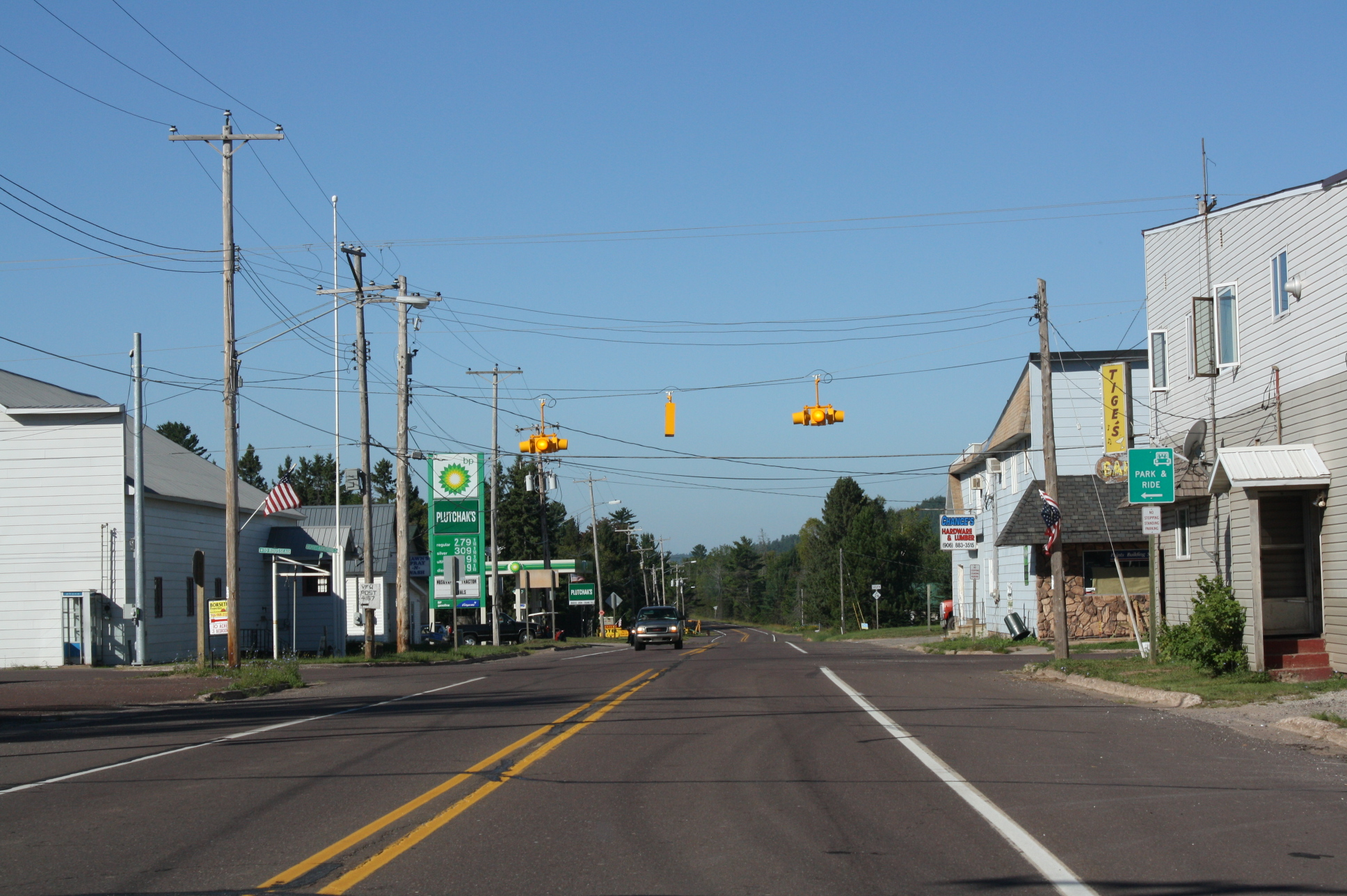
- Looking south along M-26

- Location within the state of Michigan Mass City (the United States)
- Coordinates: 46°45′50″N 89°05′11″W
- Country: United States
- State: Michigan
- County: Ontonagon
- Township: Greenland
- Settled: 1848

Area
  - Total: 0.54 sq mi (1.39 km^{2})
  - Land: 0.54 sq mi (1.39 km^{2})
  - Water: 0 sq mi (0.00 km^{2})
- Elevation: 1,056 ft (322 m)

Population (2020)
  - Total: 148
  - Density: 274.9/sq mi (106.14/km^{2})
- Time zone: UTC-5 (Eastern (EST))
  - Summer (DST): UTC-4 (EDT)
- ZIP code(s): 49948
- Area code: 906
- GNIS feature ID: 631722

Mass City (also known as Mass) is an unincorporated community in Ontonagon County in the U.S. state of Michigan. As of the 2020 census, Mass City had a population of 148. Mass City is located in Greenland Township along M-26, 13.5 miles (21.7 km) southeast of the village of Ontonagon. Mass City has its own post office with the 49948 ZIP Code .

== History ==
Mass City was first settled in 1848 by Noel Johnson, an escaped slave from Missouri who discovered copper in the area; Johnson later sold the copper deposits to the Mass Mining Company. Mass City was formally organized in 1855 and named for the mass copper mined in the area. The original site of Mass City was abandoned in 1899, when Abram and Nellie Mathews platted the current site. A post office opened in Mass City on June 15, 1899; Christ P. Anderson was the first postmaster.

== Geography ==
The small town is located within Greenland Township, Ontonagon County, in the foothills of the Porcupine Mountains. It is home to an abundance of natural forestry and wildlife able to be explored via the Courtney Lake/Old Grade Ski Trail which runs through parts of the Ottawa National Forest.

== Demographics ==
Historical population
Census	Pop.	Note	%±
2020	148		—
U.S. Decennial Census
