= Pearl Beach, St. Clair County, Michigan =

Pearl Beach, Michigan
- Census-designated place (CDP) & unincorporated community
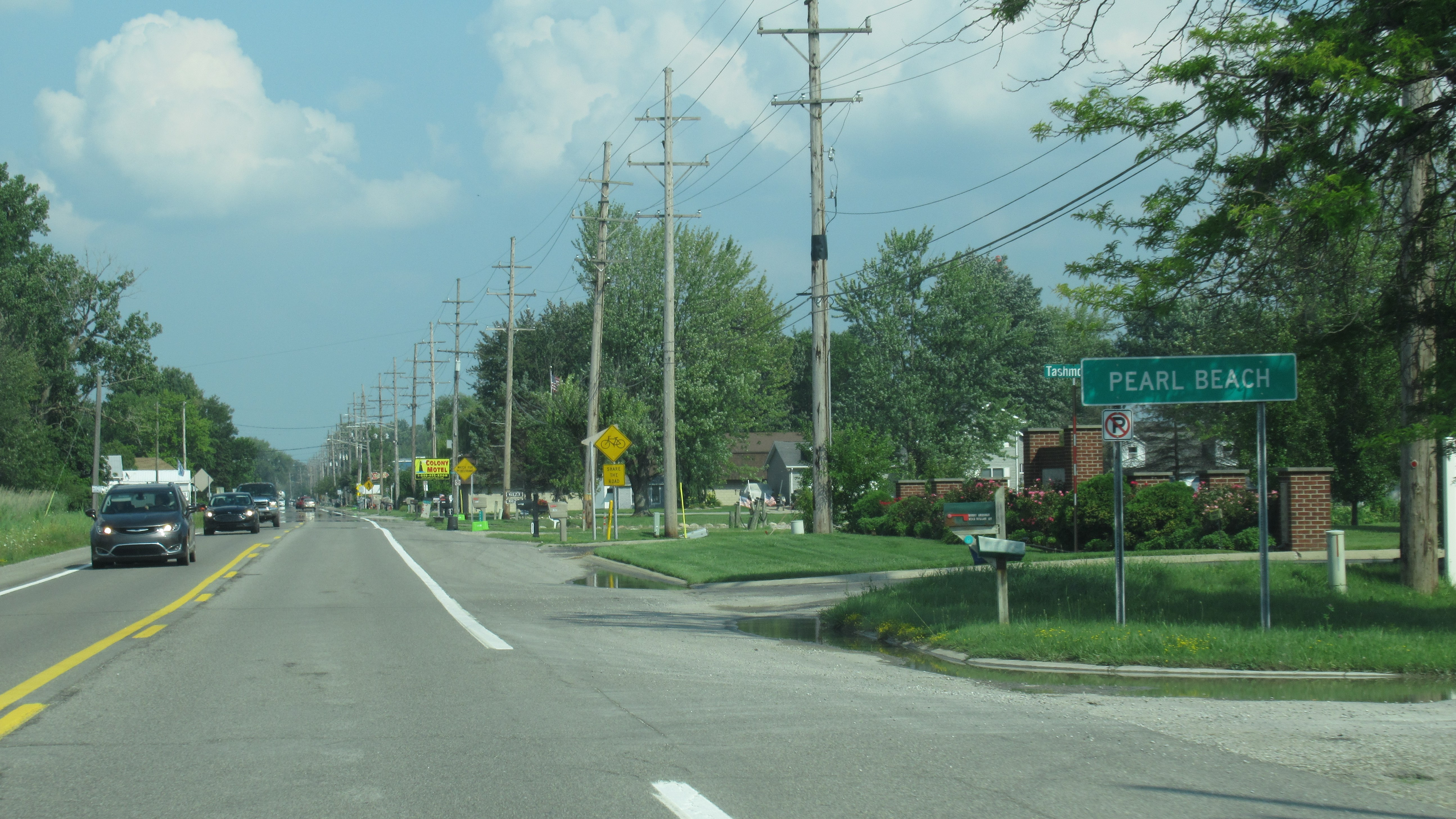
- Road signage along Pointe Tremble Road (M-29)

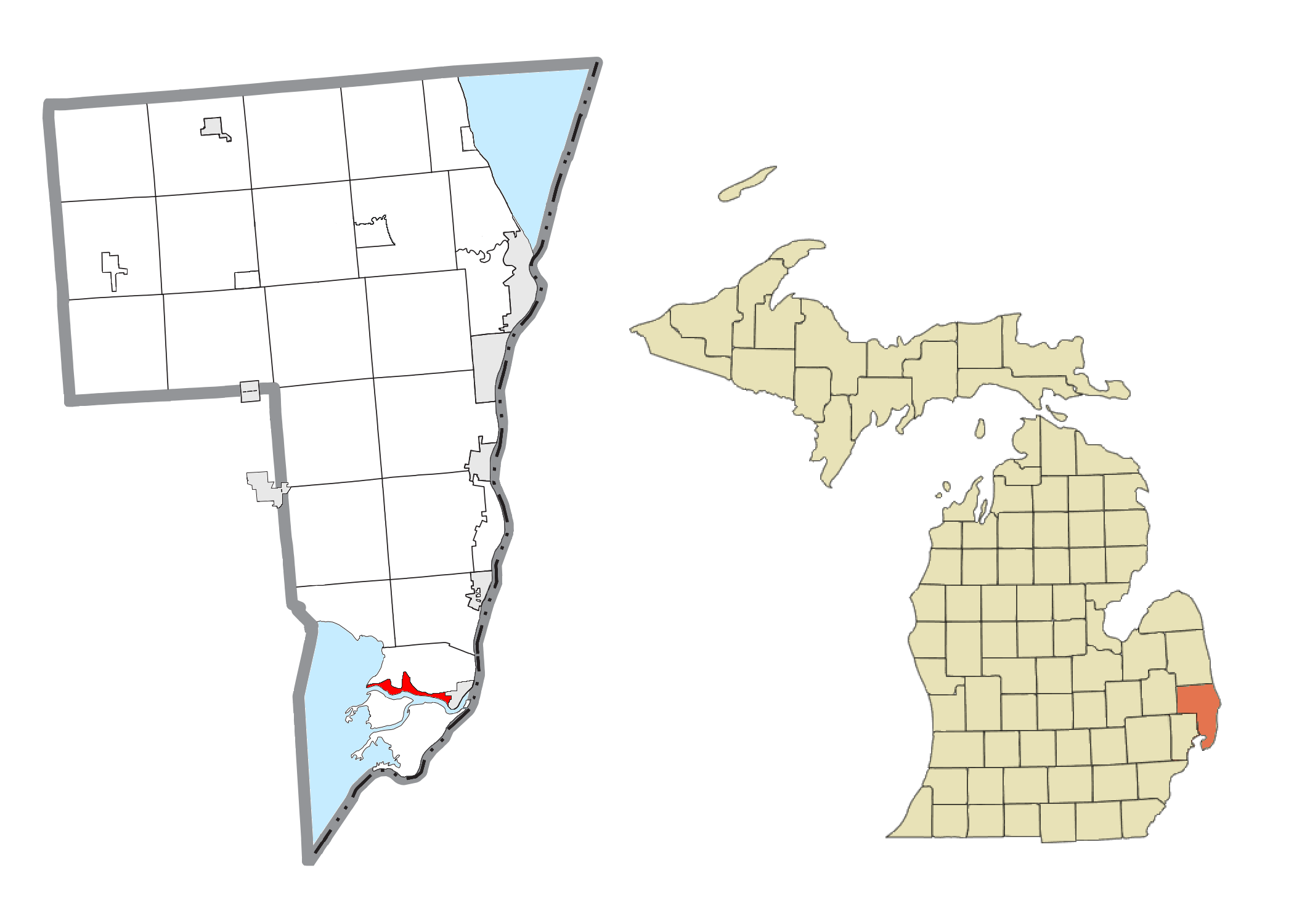
- Location within St. Clair County

- Location within the state of Michigan Location within the United States
- Coordinates: 42°37′26″N 82°35′24″W
- Country: United States
- State: Michigan
- County: St. Clair
- Township: Clay

Area
  - Total: 5.65 sq mi (14.63 km^{2})
  - Land: 4.80 sq mi (12.43 km^{2})
  - Water: 0.84 sq mi (2.18 km^{2})
- Elevation: 577 ft (176 m)

Population (2020)
  - Total: 4,698
  - Density: 978.75/sq mi (377.90/km^{2})
- Time zone: UTC-5 (Eastern (EST))
  - Summer (DST): UTC-4 (EDT)
- ZIP code(s): 48001 (Algonac)
- Area code: 810
- FIPS code: 26-63200
- GNIS feature ID: 1624814, 2393181

Pearl Beach is an unincorporated community and census-designated place (CDP) in St. Clair County in the U.S. state of Michigan. The population of the CDP was 4,698 at the 2020 census. The community is located within Clay Township.

== History ==
This area along the North Channel connecting Anchor Bay to the Saint Clair River was settled as early as 1796 when a dozen private land claims were made by the French. A now-defunct post office began operating here under the name Pearlbeach on August 2, 1898. Harry Bryant, who was an agent for the Detroit and St. Clair Railroad, served as the first postmaster.

The Colony Tower Complex was built in Pearl Beach along the North Channel in 1925. The site is listed on the National Register of Historic Places and is also a designated Michigan State Historic Site.

== Geography ==
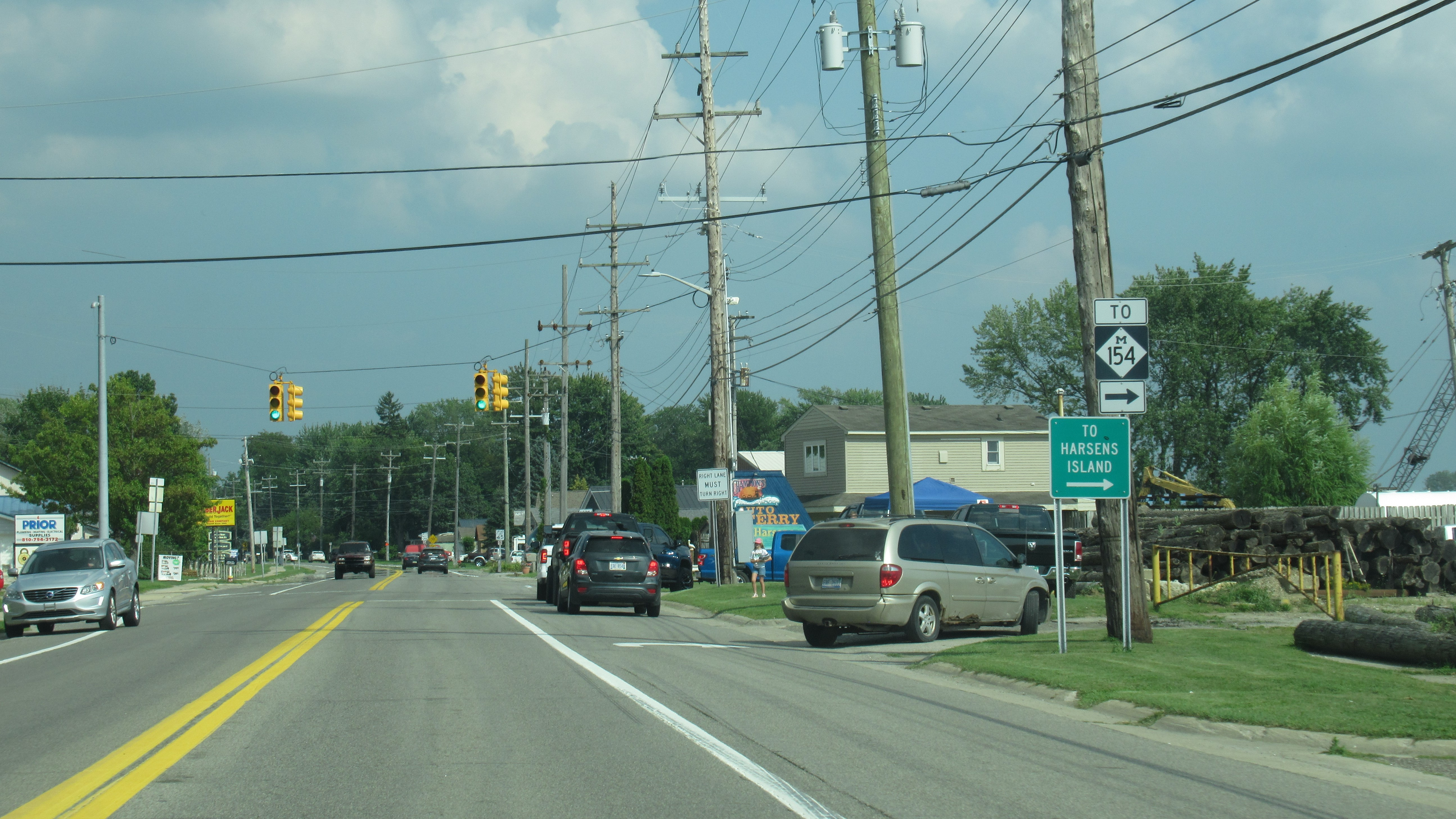
Looking east along M-29 toward the ferry service to Harsens Island and M-154

According to the U.S. Census Bureau, the CDP has a total area of 5.65 square miles (14.63 km^{2}), of which 4.80 square miles (12.43 km^{2}) is land and 0.84 square miles (2.18 km^{2}) (14.87%) is water.

The CDP consists of a narrow strip along the north side of the North Channel of the St. Clair River from the western border of Algonac to the easternmost point of land where the North Channel flows into Anchor Bay. The community is served by Algonac Community Schools to the east in the city of Algonac.

The CDP also contains the unincorporated community of Pointe aux Tremble, which was settled in 1904 as a station along the railway about 3.0 miles (4.8 km) west of Algonac. The St. John's Marsh State Wildlife Area is a 3,060-acre (12.4 km^{2}) state wildlife area that has small portions within Pearl Beach.

=== Ferry service ===
- Harsens Island Ferry Landing is located in the eastern portion of the Pearl Beach CDP. The ferry service crosses the North Channel and connects to M-154 on Harsens Island.

=== Major highways ===
- M-29 (Pointe Tremble Road) runs west–east through the community along the northern shores of the North Channel.

== Demographics ==
Historical population
Census	Pop.	Note	%±
1990	3,394		—
2000	3,224		−5.0%
2010	2,829		−12.3%
2020	4,698		66.1%
U.S. Decennial Census

As of the census of 2000, there were 3,224 people, 1,395 households, and 980 families residing in the community. The population density was 1,514.7 inhabitants per square mile (584.8/km^{2}). There were 1,560 housing units at an average density of 732.9 per square mile (283.0/km^{2}). The racial makeup of the community was 98.17% White, 0.40% Native American, 0.16% Asian, 0.34% from other races, and 0.93% from two or more races. Hispanic or Latino of any race were 0.62% of the population.

There were 1,395 households, out of which 20.1% had children under the age of 18 living with them, 62.9% were married couples living together, 4.3% had a female householder with no husband present, and 29.7% were non-families. 24.8% of all households were made up of individuals, and 11.1% had someone living alone who was 65 years of age or older. The average household size was 2.31 and the average family size was 2.76.

In the community, the population was spread out, with 17.4% under the age of 18, 6.1% from 18 to 24, 23.9% from 25 to 44, 36.2% from 45 to 64, and 16.4% who were 65 years of age or older. The median age was 46 years. For every 100 females, there were 106.4 males. For every 100 females age 18 and over, there were 102.7 males.

The median income for a household in the community was $55,186, and the median income for a family was $68,583. Males had a median income of $58,542 versus $28,811 for females. The per capita income for the community was $32,320. About 0.6% of families and 3.2% of the population were below the poverty line, including 2.9% of those under age 18 and 5.2% of those age 65 or over.
