= Pierce Stocking Scenic Drive =

Scenic drive in Michigan

Pierce Stocking Scenic Drive
- Pierce Stocking Scenic Drive highlighted in red

Route information
- Maintained by NPS
- Length: 7.4 mi (11.9 km)
- Existed: 1967–present
- Restrictions: Open to vehicular traffic April–November, 9:00 a.m. to 30 minutes after sunset

Points of interest
- From: M-109 near Empire
- Covered Bridge; Lake Michigan Overlook; Sleeping Bear Dune Overlook
- To: M-109 near Empire

Location
- Country: United States
- Counties: Leelanau

Highway system
- Scenic Byways; National; National Forest; BLM; NPS

The Pierce Stocking Scenic Drive is a scenic route within Sleeping Bear Dunes National Lakeshore, in western Northern Michigan in the United States. The roadway, with its "scenic vistas and gentle curves", is located off state highway M-109 between Empire and Glen Arbor. It runs for 7.4 miles (11.9 km) through forest and dunes areas, providing access to scenic overlooks of the Lake Michigan shoreline and the surrounding park land. Interpretive markers along the roadway are keyed to the National Park Service's printed guide to the drive. Over 80,000 vehicles make the trip, in addition to bicyclists, hikers and skiers who use the road each year.

The road was built in the 1960s and finished in 1967 by Pierce Stocking. A lumberman with road-building experience, he wanted to share the beauty of the area with others. He operated the facility until his death in 1976; afterwards it was purchased by the National Park Service and added to the park. In the 1980s, a two-year program reconstructed the roadway and added a number of features for visiting tourists. In 2011, the morning show Good Morning America named the Sleeping Bear Dunes, and Pierce Stocking Drive, as the "Most Beautiful Place in America" after a viewer poll on its website; publicity since the award has increased traffic along the roadway.

== Route description ==
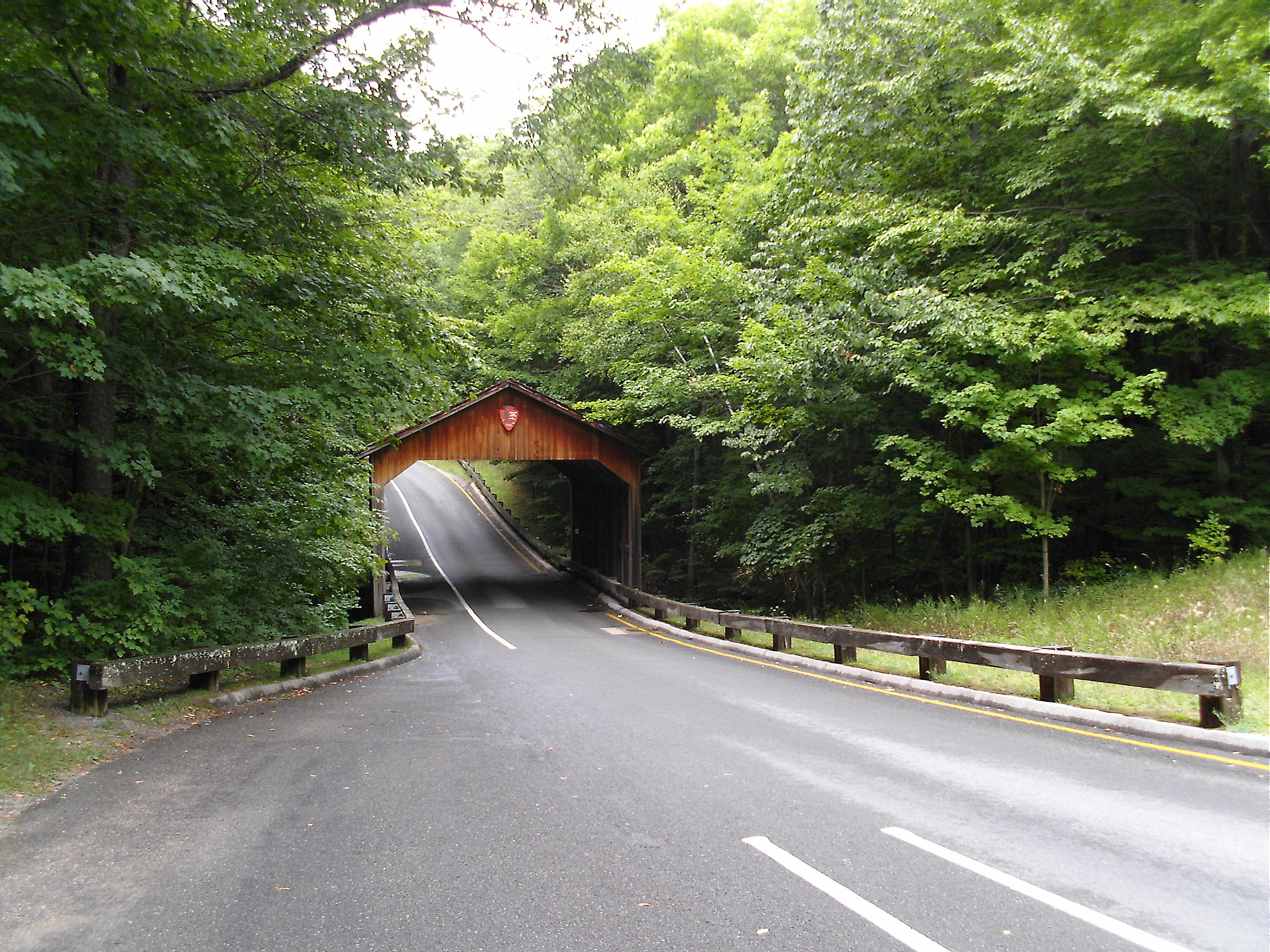
Covered bridge on the scenic drive

The road is a 7.4-mile (11.9 km) loop that can be driven or bicycled. Hiking the roadway is permitted, but not encouraged because of the traffic. The roadway starts at an entrance off M-109 (DH Day Highway) south of Glen Lake. There is a parking lot inside the entrance for visitors who wish to bike or hike the road. From there, the drive continues as a two-way road to the entrance gate before turning northward as a one-way road. There are 12 numbered locations along the road that are listed in the drive's interpretive brochure. The first of these is a covered bridge. After this point, the drive ascends a steep hill to an overlook of Glen Lake. The area around this location includes "heavily forested areas, sand plains and scrub growth among the rock outcrops". The next stop is the Dune Overlook and Picnic Mountain picnic area. From this vantage point, tourists can view both North and South Manitou islands, also part of the park, as well as Pyramid Point and Sleeping Bear Bay. As the drive approaches this stop and the fourth, the Cottonwood Trail, it emerges from the forest into the sandy dune area next to Lake Michigan. Several more stops are noted in the guide before Pierce Stocking Scenic Drive heads back inland through the beech and maple forest.

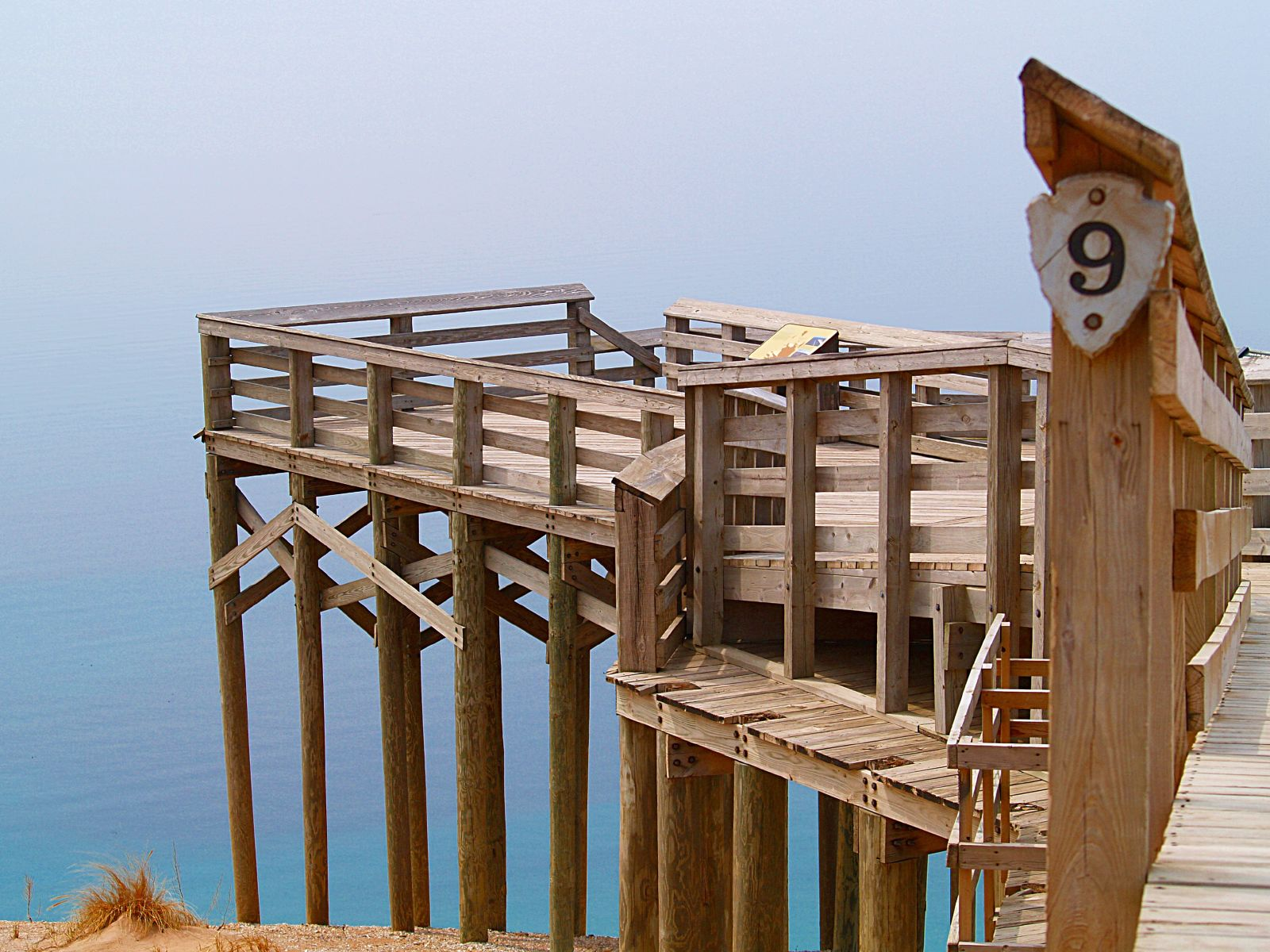
Lake Michigan Overlook

The roadway turns back to the shore and two overlooks next to the lake. Overlook 9 is next to the bluff on Lake Michigan, 450 feet (140 m) above the water, and overlook 10 is for views of the Sleeping Bear Dune. From overlook 9, visitors can see Platte Bay some nine miles (14.5 km) to the south on a clear day. These two locations are considered especially hazardous because of the heights involved. In 2002, the Detroit Free Press noted that a half-dozen visitors have to be rescued by paramedics at these two overlooks after falls. The community of Glen Arbor has a special off-road vehicle to effect rescues from the base of the cliffs. The penultimate stop along the drive is the North Bar Overlook and Picnic Area, which provides vistas of North Bar Lake. After this stop, the drive descends into maple and pine forests before coming back to the starting point. This area follows an old logging road under the forest canopy. The drive has been called "the best way to see Lake Michigan from top of the dune elevations", and "one of the nation's most fascinating landscapes".

A Park Pass fee is required for using the Pierce Stocking Scenic Drive (except for Golden Age Passport/Senior Pass holders). A free interpretive guide for the scenic drive is available at the visitor center in Empire or at the entrance gate. The road is open to cars generally from the middle of April into November. During the operating season, the road is open starting at 9:00 a.m. until 30 minutes after sunset. After late December, the drive is used as a cross-country ski trail. The park service combines the unplowed roadway with the Shauger Hill Trail to form an eight-mile (13 km) system of trails of various ratings. The speed limit on the Pierce Stocking Scenic Drive is 20 mph (32 km/h). In 2008, there were 82,527 vehicles that circled the drive, a 4.7% increase over the previous year.

== History ==
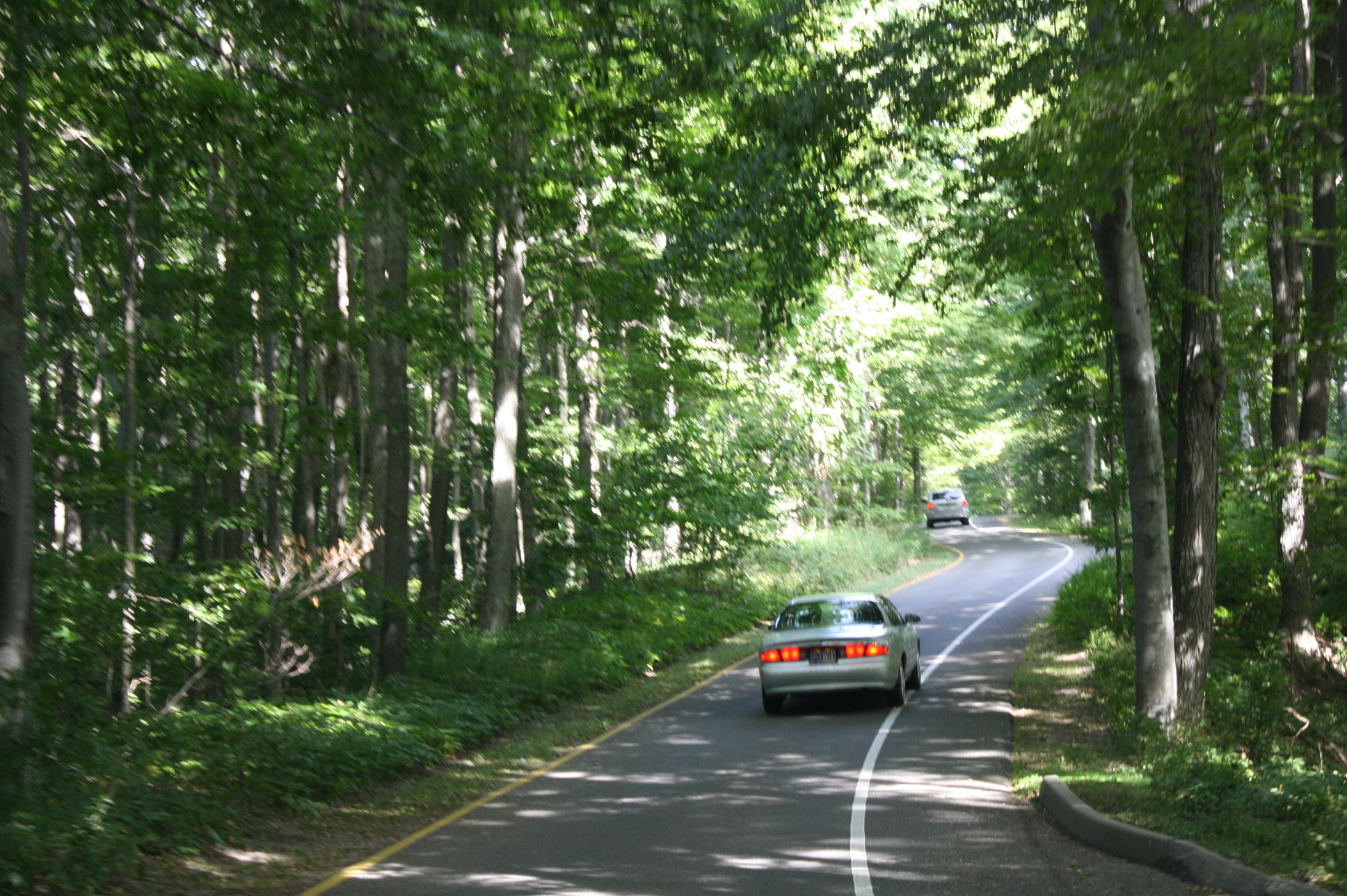
Wooded section

The road is named after Pierce Stocking, who spent his youth working as a Michigan lumberman and used to walk the bluffs above Lake Michigan near Empire. As a lumberman he had experience building roads. Stocking began building a road to the top of the dunes in the difficult terrain around the early 1960s. According to National Geographic, Stocking was "so awed by the beauty of the dunes that ... he built the road in order to share them with visitors." The road was originally known as the Sleeping Bear Dunes Park when he first opened it to the public in 1967. He operated the scenic drive until his death in 1976, charging $2 per car (equivalent to $11.03 in 2024) at the end.

The area around the roadway became part of the Sleeping Bear Dunes National Lakeshore when the park was created in 1970, and the road became part of the park itself in late 1976 when purchased by the park service just before the death of Stocking. The purchase included 2,976 acres (1,204 ha) at a cost of $2.9 million (equivalent to $12.4 million in 2024). It opened to the public without admission fees in June 1977. That first year, 27,252 vehicles used the roadway, an average of 375 per day, but as high as 800 on some Sundays during the 62-day period.

At the time, it was named the Philip A. Hart Nature Trail after the senator, who backed the creation of the national lakeshore. The name proved unpopular with local residents when it was announced. The name was later changed to Pierce Stocking Scenic Drive in honor of the roadway's creator on November 1, 1979.

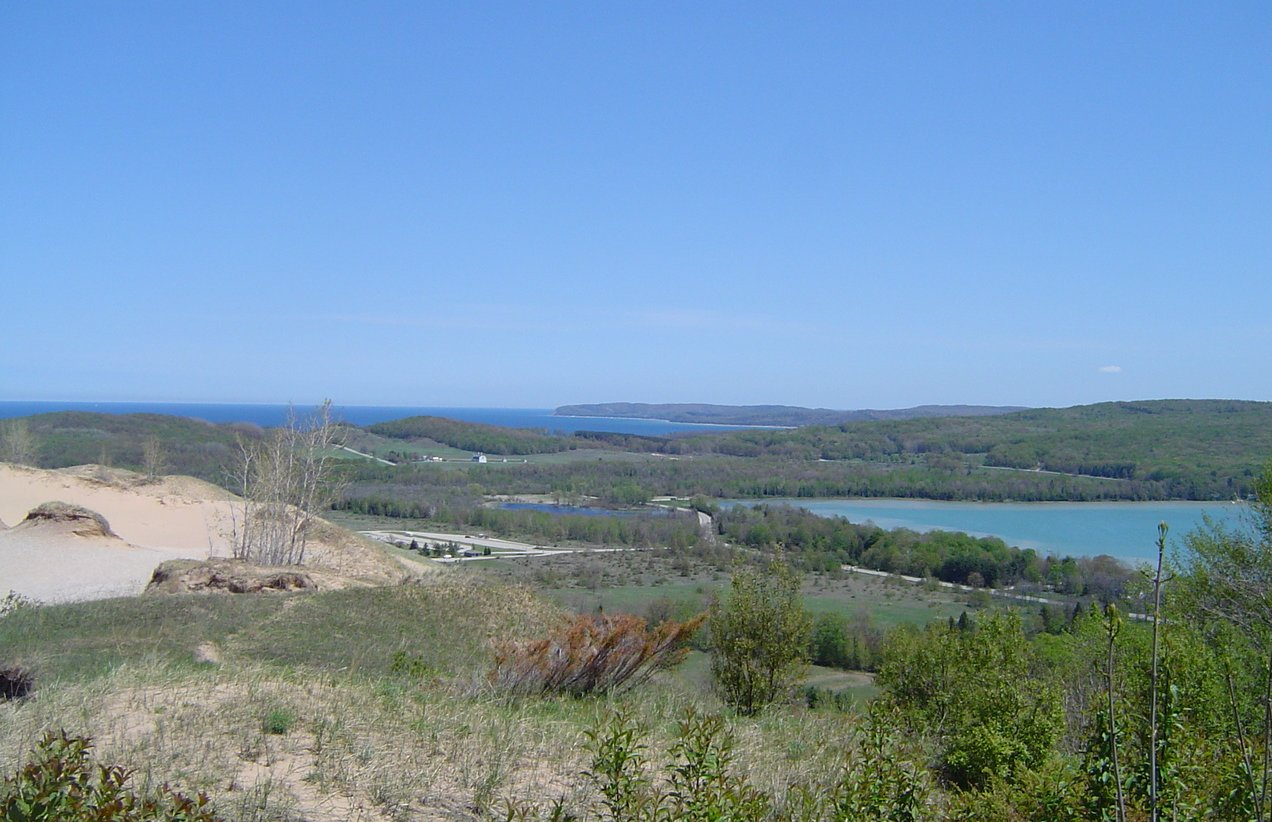
View of Glen Lake

Starting in 1984, the National Park Service reconstructed the drive. It was paved for the first time, and a bicycle lane was added. The service also moved the entrance to the road and built the observation platforms. An original section of the road was closed because it was susceptible to drifting sands from the dunes. Stocking built the covered bridge, but the "NPS has maintained it and increased its vertical clearance to 13 feet 6 inches [4.11 m]." The renovations to the drive were completed in 1986.

In August 2011, the Sleeping Bear Dunes National Lakeshore was named by Good Morning America as the "Most Beautiful Place in America"; the designation came after a social media campaign to capitalize on the show's website poll. Since the park was awarded the title, attendance has increased. Pierce Stocking Scenic Drive, featured in the morning show's broadcast, had 0.25-mile-long (0.40 km) lines of cars waiting to get onto the drive on September 3, 2011, (Note: September 3, 2011, was the Saturday of Labor Day Weekend that year.) an uncommon sight for a day in September.

== Points of interest ==
The entire roadway is in Glen Arbor Township, Leelanau County.

mi	km	Number	Point of interest	Notes
0.0	0.0		M-109 – Empire, Glen Haven	Entrance to Pierce Stocking Scenic Drive
0.4	0.64	—	Entrance gate	Interpretive guides are available here; a park pass is required past this point
0.7	1.1	Beginning of one-way loop		
1.1	1.8	1	Covered Bridge	Built by Pierce Stocking and renovated by the National Park Service; 13-foot-6-inch (4.11 m) clearance for vehicles
1.9	3.1	2	Glen Lake Overlook	
2.3	3.7	3	Dune Overlook	Bicycle rack available here
2.4	3.9	4	Cottonwood Trail	
2.5	4.0	5	Dune Ecology	Educational station
2.9	4.7	6	Leaving the Sand Dunes	Educational station
3.0	4.8	7	Beech-Maple Forest	Educational station
4.1	6.6	8	Changes over Time	Educational station
5.1	8.2	9	Lake Michigan Overlook	Visitors are cautioned to remain on the walkways for their safety; overlook is 450 feet (140 m) above Lake Michigan
5.1	8.2	10	Sleeping Bear Dune Overlook	Shares a parking lot with the Lake Michigan Overlook; bicycle rack available here
5.6	9.0	11	North Bar Lake Overlook	Bicycle rack available here
6.1	9.8	12	Pine plantation	Educational station
6.7	10.8	End of one-way loop		
7.0	11.3	—	Entrance gate	Drop box to return interpretive guides
7.4	11.9		M-109 – Empire, Glen Haven	Exit from Pierce Stocking Scenic Drive
1.000 mi = 1.609 km; 1.000 km = 0.621 mi

== See also ==
- Brockway Mountain Drive, a scenic roadway overlooking Lake Superior near Copper Harbor, Michigan
- River Road National Scenic Byway, a National Scenic Byway and National Forest Scenic Byway in the Huron National Forest
