= River Road National Scenic Byway =

Road in Iosco County, Michigan, United States

River Road National Scenic Byway
- River Road National Forest Scenic Byway
- River Road NSB highlighted in red

Route information
- Maintained by MDOT and ICRC
- Length: 23.458 mi (37.752 km)
- Existed: September 22, 2005–present

Major junctions
- West end: M-65 near Hale
- East end: US 23 in Oscoda

Location
- Country: United States
- State: Michigan
- Counties: Iosco

Highway system
- Scenic Byways; National; National Forest; BLM; NPS; Michigan State Trunkline Highway System; Interstate; US; State; Byways
- Iosco County Roads

The River Road National Scenic Byway (also called the River Road National Forest Scenic Byway) is a National Scenic Byway and National Forest Scenic Byway in the US state of Michigan. This 23 1/2-mile-long (37.8 km) byway follows M-65 and River Road; it extends eastward into the Huron National Forest and ends in the historic community of Oscoda near Lake Huron. The road parallels the historic Au Sable River (French: Rivière aux Sable, "River of Sand") which has historically been a major transportation route for floating Michigan's giant white pine from the forest to the saw mill towns on Lake Huron. Along its course, the roadway offers access to several recreational areas as well as the local scenery. The section of the River Road that follows M-65 was added to the State Trunkline Highway System in the 1930s. The River Road was given National Forest Scenic Byway status in 1988, and National Scenic Byway status in 2005.

== Route description ==
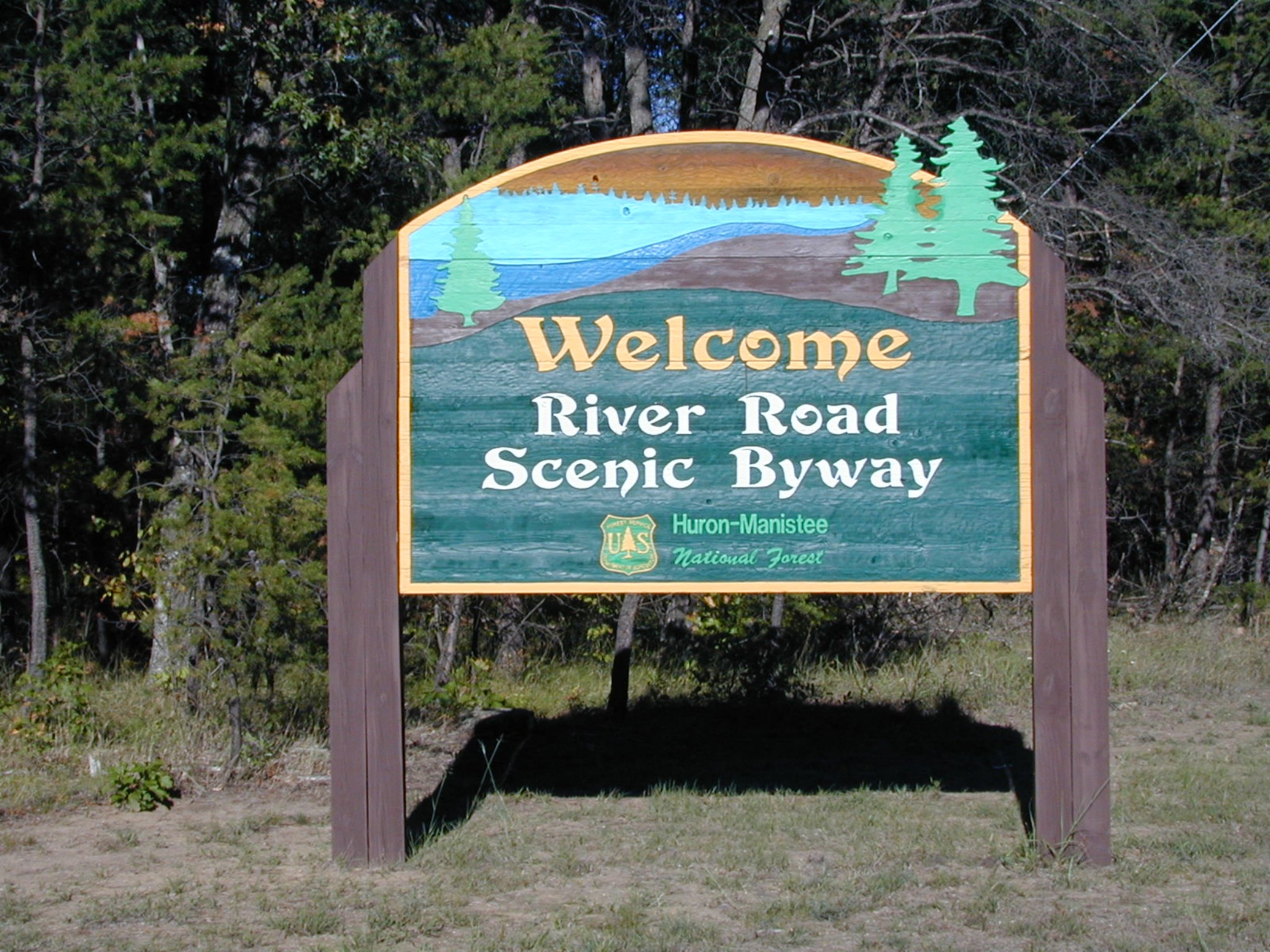
Entrance sign north of Hale

The scenic byway starts at the intersection of M-65 and Rollways Road and runs eastward along M-65 near Loud Dam Pond. The road runs through the Huron National Forest and along the Five Channels Dam Pond to a junction with River Road. There, the byway leaves M-65 to follow River Road eastward along the south bank of the Au Sable River. The road passes the Canoer's Memorial, the Kiwanis Monument and the Lumberman's Monument near Cooke Dam Pond. River Road runs away from the river, cutting across forest land near a bend in the Au Sable. Near the Old Orchard Park, the byway follows the southern shore of Foote Dam Pond. From here east, the roadway continues along the south bank of the river, across from Oscoda-Wurtsmith Airport, as it runs into Oscoda. The eastern terminus of the byway is at a junction with US 23 in town, a few blocks from Lake Huron. The segment of the byway that follows M-65 is maintained by the Michigan Department of Transportation (MDOT), while River Road is under the jurisdiction of the Iosco County Road Commission (ICRC).

== Recreational opportunities ==
Byway travelers will find abundant, year-round recreation opportunities, with many trails for hiking and cross-country skiing. Camping, fishing, and wildlife viewing are popular activities along the byway. Visitors can enjoy the forest and vistas from the scenic overlooks along the route. Other sites along the byway include the Lumberman's Monument and its visitors' center which are dedicated to telling the story of Michigan's lumber industry in the 19th century. The Iargo Springs Interpretive Site presents visitors with exhibitions on natural springs and boardwalks along the river.

== History ==
The section of the byway that follows M-65 was first added to the state highway system in the mid-1930s. On December 20, 1988, the National Forest Service designated the River Road National Forest Scenic Byway in Iosco County. A second designation was added on September 22, 2005, when the Federal Highway Administration listed the roadway as the River Road National Scenic Byway.

== Major intersections ==
The entire byway is in Iosco County.

Location	mi	km	Destinations	Notes
Plainfield Township	0.000	0.000	M-65 south – Hale; Rollways Road	Western end of the National Scenic Byway at Rollways Road; M-65 continues southward
Oscoda Township	4.317	6.948	M-65 north – Glennie; River Road east – Oscoda	M-65 departs the byway northward
Oscoda	23.458	37.752	US 23 / LHCT – Standish, Alpena	Eastern end of the National Scenic Byway
1.000 mi = 1.609 km; 1.000 km = 0.621 mi

== See also ==
- Black River National Forest Scenic Byway, another National Forest Scenic Byway in the state
- Brockway Mountain Drive, a scenic roadway overlooking Lake Superior near Copper Harbor, Michigan
- Pierce Stocking Scenic Drive, a similar scenic drive in the Sleeping Bear Dunes National Lakeshore
- Whitefish Bay National Forest Scenic Byway, another National Forest Scenic Byway in the state
