= Michigan AuSable Valley Railroad =

Coordinates: 44.6737315°N 84.0508437°W

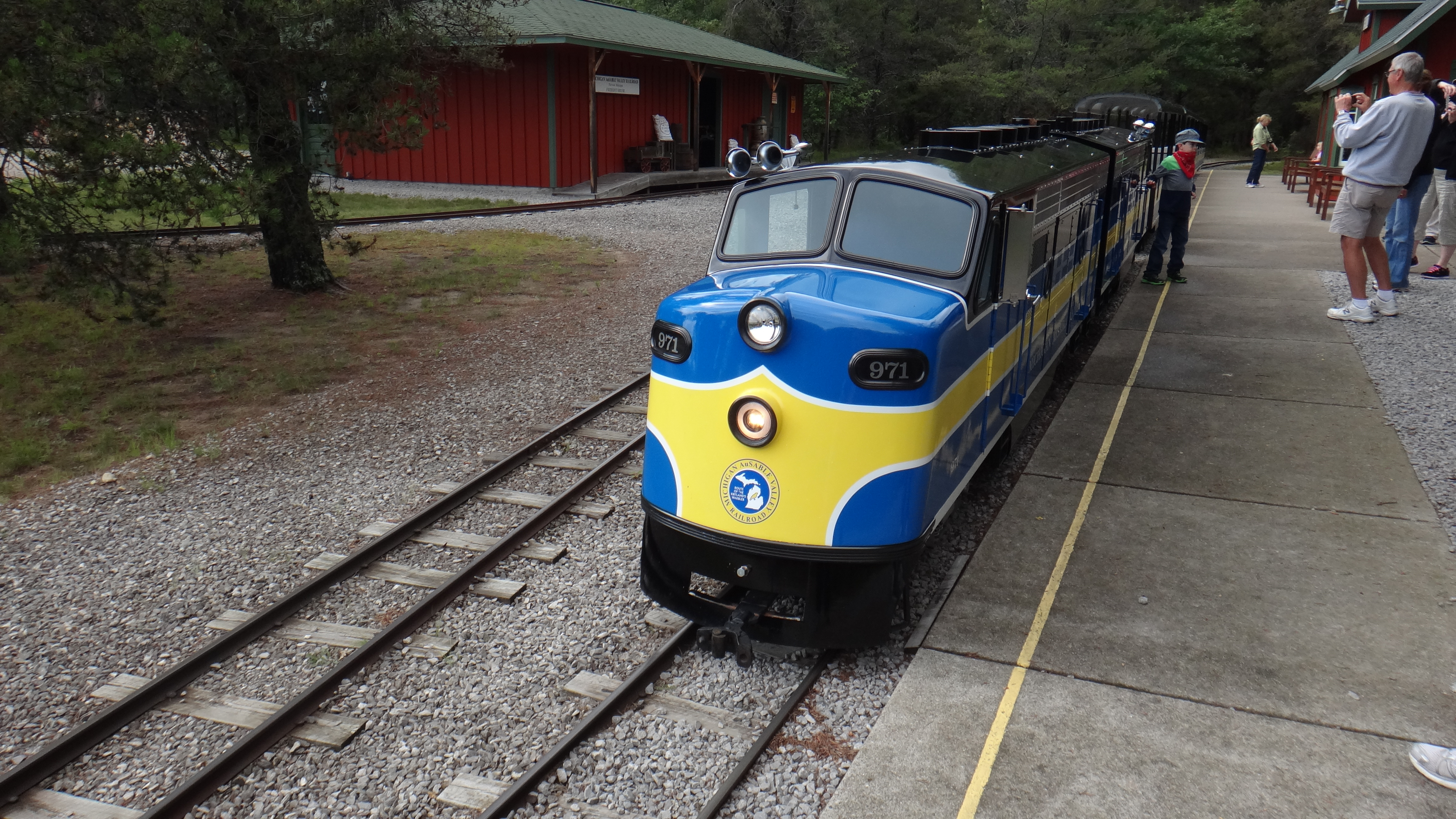
- Front view of the 971 engine

Overview
- Headquarters: Fairview, Michigan
- Locale: Huron National Forest
- Dates of operation: 1994–2017

Technical
- Track gauge: 16 in (406 mm)
- Length: 1.5 miles (2.4 km)

Other
- Website: www.michiganausablevalleyrailroad.com

The Michigan AuSable Valley Railroad was a 16 in (406 mm), 1/4-scale ridable miniature railway, located in Fairview, Michigan. The railroad ran through the scenic Huron National Forest and the Comins Creek valley. The railroad operated continuously from 1994 before closing permanently in 2021 due to COVID-19 and deteriorating infrastructure, trestles and roadbed.

== History ==
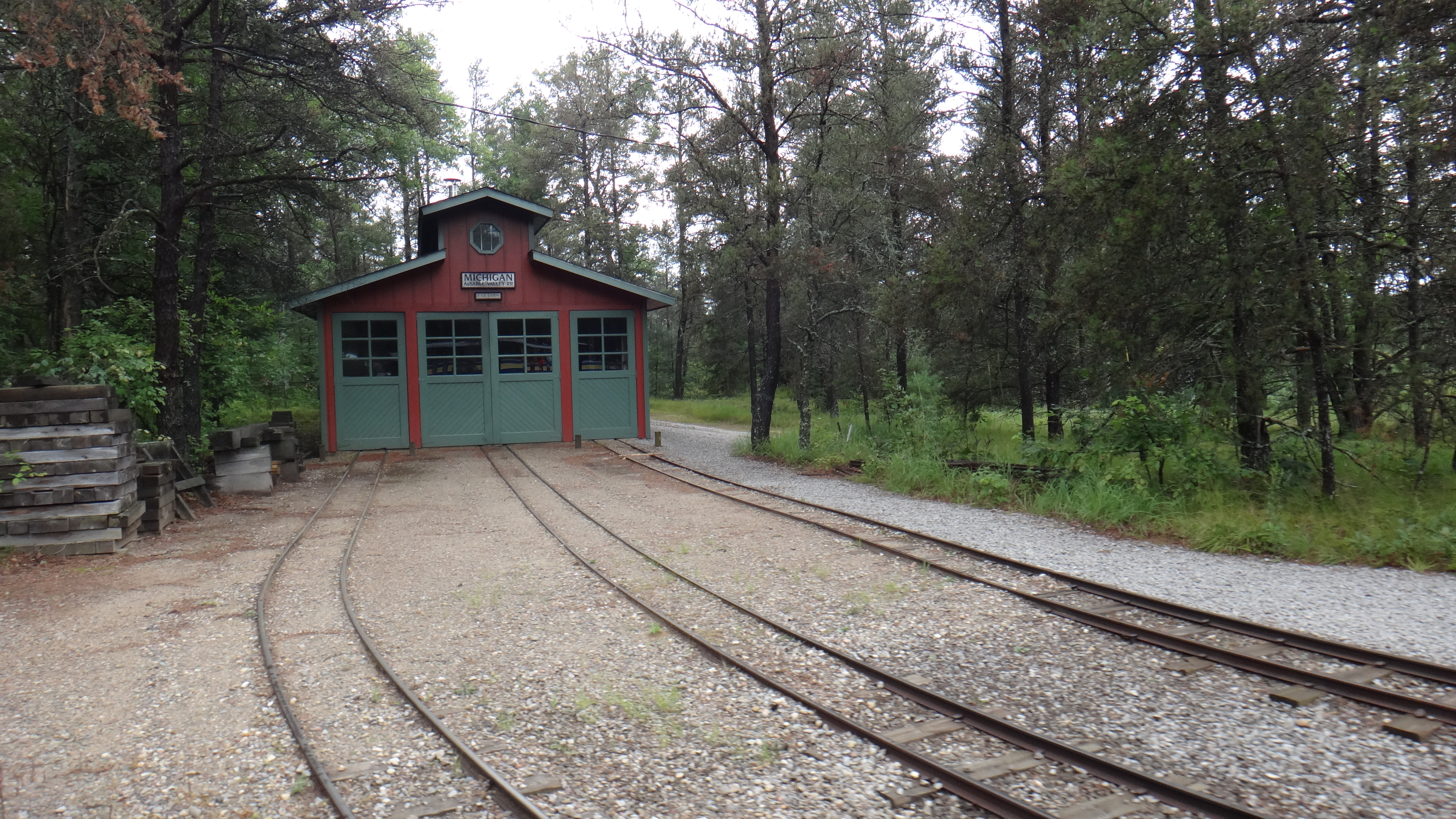
Michigan AuSable Valley Railroad Engine House

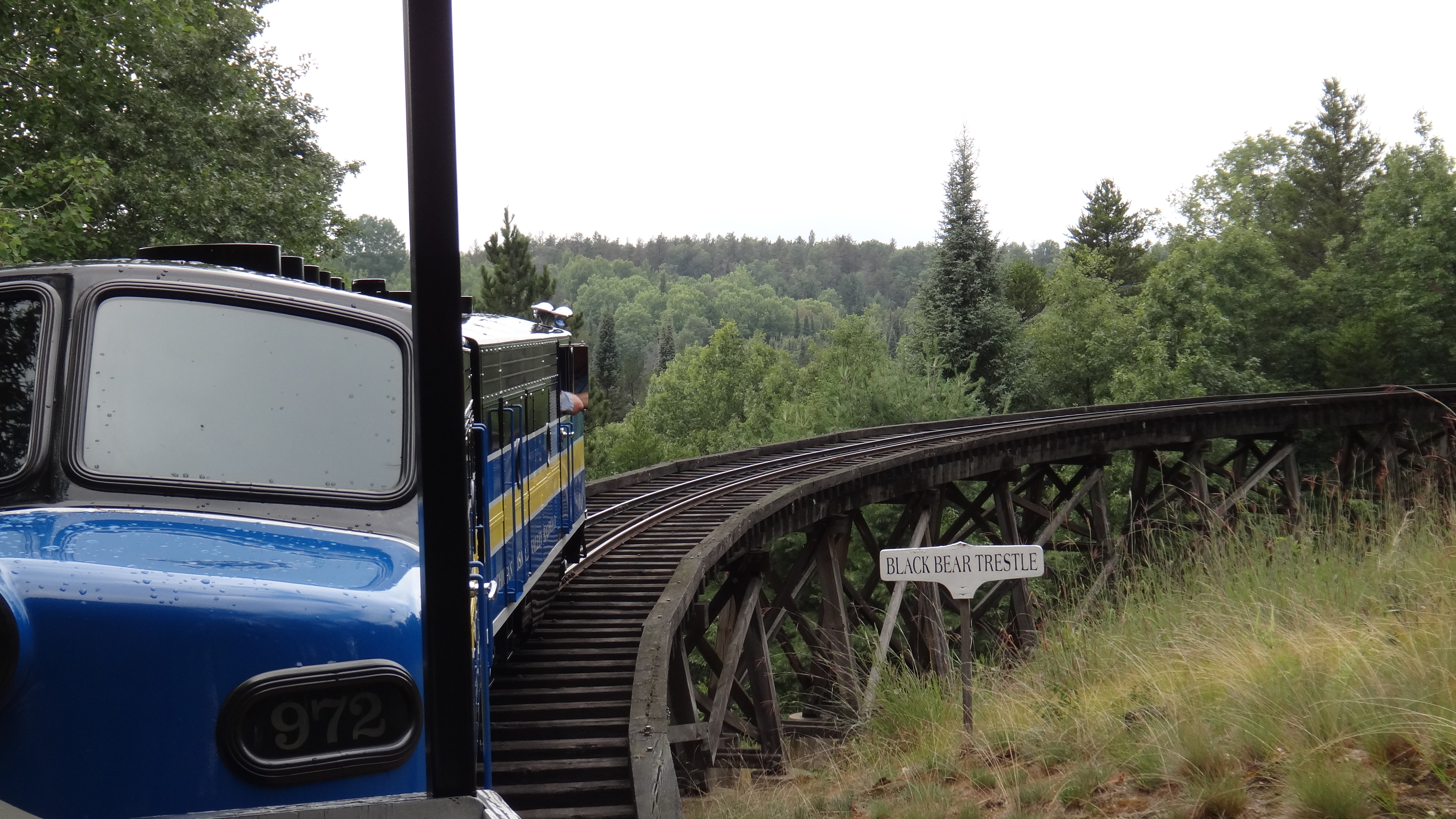
Black Bear Trestle

The railroad was created by Joanne and Howard Schrader. They began construction of the Michigan AuSable Valley Railroad station and the 72-foot (22 m) engine house in 1994. In 1995, seven passenger cars from the Pinconning and Blind River Railroad were restored for use on the line. The cars are named after area counties and other points of interest in the Huron National Forest. From 15 April to 2 December 1996, the Michigan AuSable Valley Railroad constructed two wooden trestles and a 115-foot (35 m) wooden tunnel. The longest trestle spanned over 220 feet (67 m). The railroad meandered through jack pine country near the valleys of the Au Sable River.

The Schraders were publishers, distributors and operators of a railroad catalog.

Trainorders.com reported in 2017 that the Schraders retired from operating the railroad and the catalog. The facility, owners' residence and acreage was listed for sale in 2017, together with the affiliated railroad catalog store. The railroad was sold to Kings Lights of Texas

== Locomotives ==
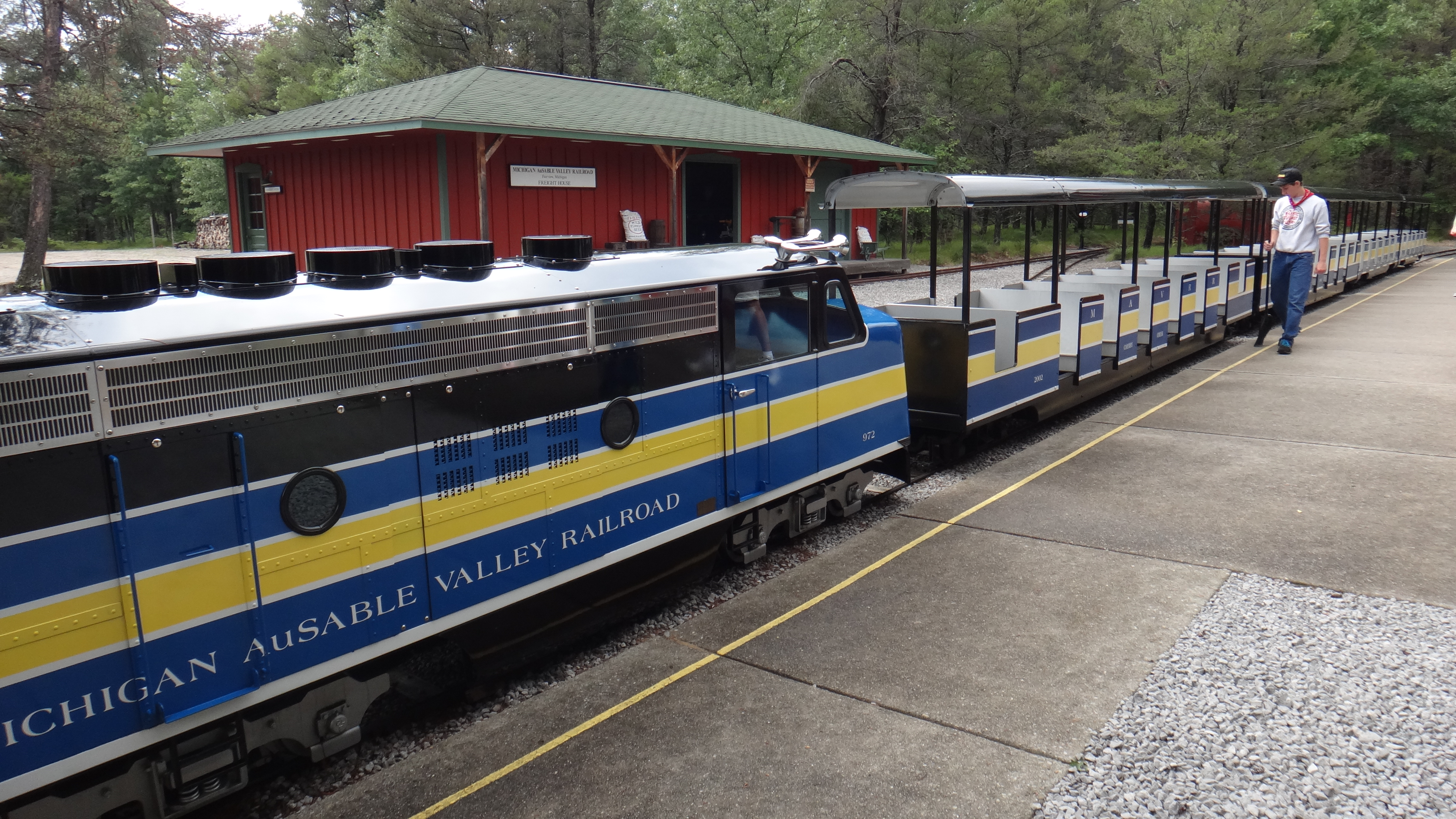
View of the slug unit

The Custom Locomotive Works in Chicago constructed a pair of miniature F-7 A diesel locomotive units for the Michigan AuSable Valley Railroad over a period of nine months. The front locomotive contains the engine while the slug unit balances the weight. The units have a combined weight of 11,000 pounds and length of 30 feet (9.1 m) long; they are 58 inches (1,500 mm) high. The powered unit has an 80 hp Perkins diesel engine driving 16 wheels and supplying power to an air-brake system.

Locomotive No. 5661 is a 4-6-4 oil-fired steam engine, known as the "Hudson", built in 1961 by E.C. Eddy of Fairview. The locomotive originally ran on the Pinconning and Blind River Railroad. It now runs on the AuSable on selected Sundays and holidays. The Hudson steam locomotive was restored circa 2002.

The trackage was laid by family and friends. It was serpentine, sometimes with parallel and crossing tracks, making a surprising 1.5 miles (2.4 km) trip, approximately 18 minutes long. The railroad used over 5,500 railroad ties. In 1995 four switches were added to the route.
