= Huron National Forest =

National forest in Michigan, United States

- IUCN category VI (protected area with sustainable use of natural resources)
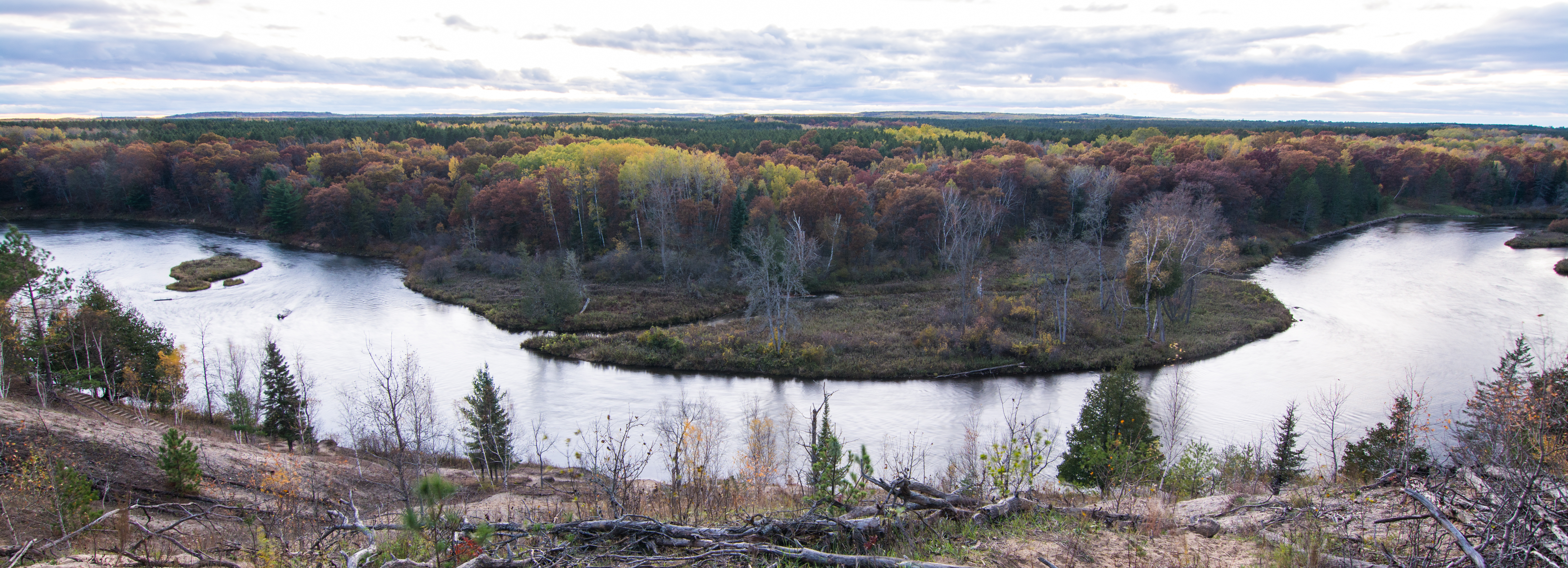
- The Au Sable River in the Huron National Forest

- Map showing National Forests in Michigan
- Location: Lower Peninsula, Michigan
- Coordinates: 44.57°N 83.99°W
- Area: 438,584 acres (1,770 km^{2})
- Established: 1909
- Governing body: United States Forest Service
- Website: Huron–Manistee National Forests

The Huron National Forest is a National Forest in the Lower Peninsula of Michigan. It was established in 1909 after the logging era began to decline. In 1945, it was administratively combined with the Manistee National Forest, to create the Huron–Manistee National Forest. However, these are not connected and are separate forests. It provides recreation opportunities for visitors, habitat for fish and wildlife, and resources for local industry. The headquarters for the forest is located in Cadillac, Michigan.

== History ==
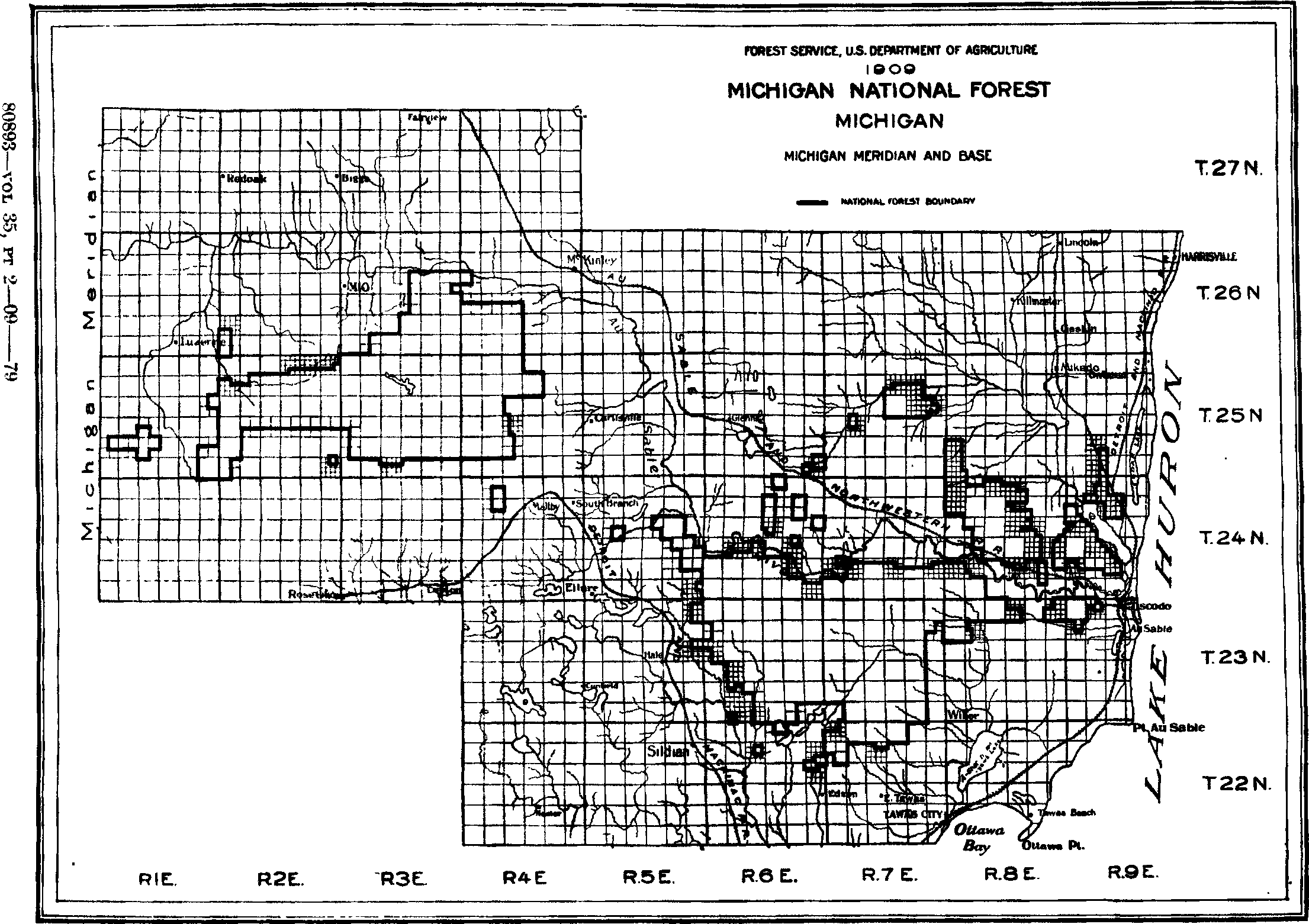
United States Statutes at Large Volume 35 Part 2 scan image 1151

During the Great Depression land was bought by the U.S. Forest Service to help farmers and landowners and to inject money into the economy. However, some landowners only sold the unproductive land and kept the productive areas, thus breaking up the land purchases. The Forest Service established the Huron National Forest in 1909.

The Huron National Forest is 437,287 acres (176,964 ha) spreading 70 miles (110 km) east to west and 30 miles (48 km) north to south. The forest was renamed in 1929 after an Iroquoian tribe of the Great Lakes Region—the Huron.

== Geography ==
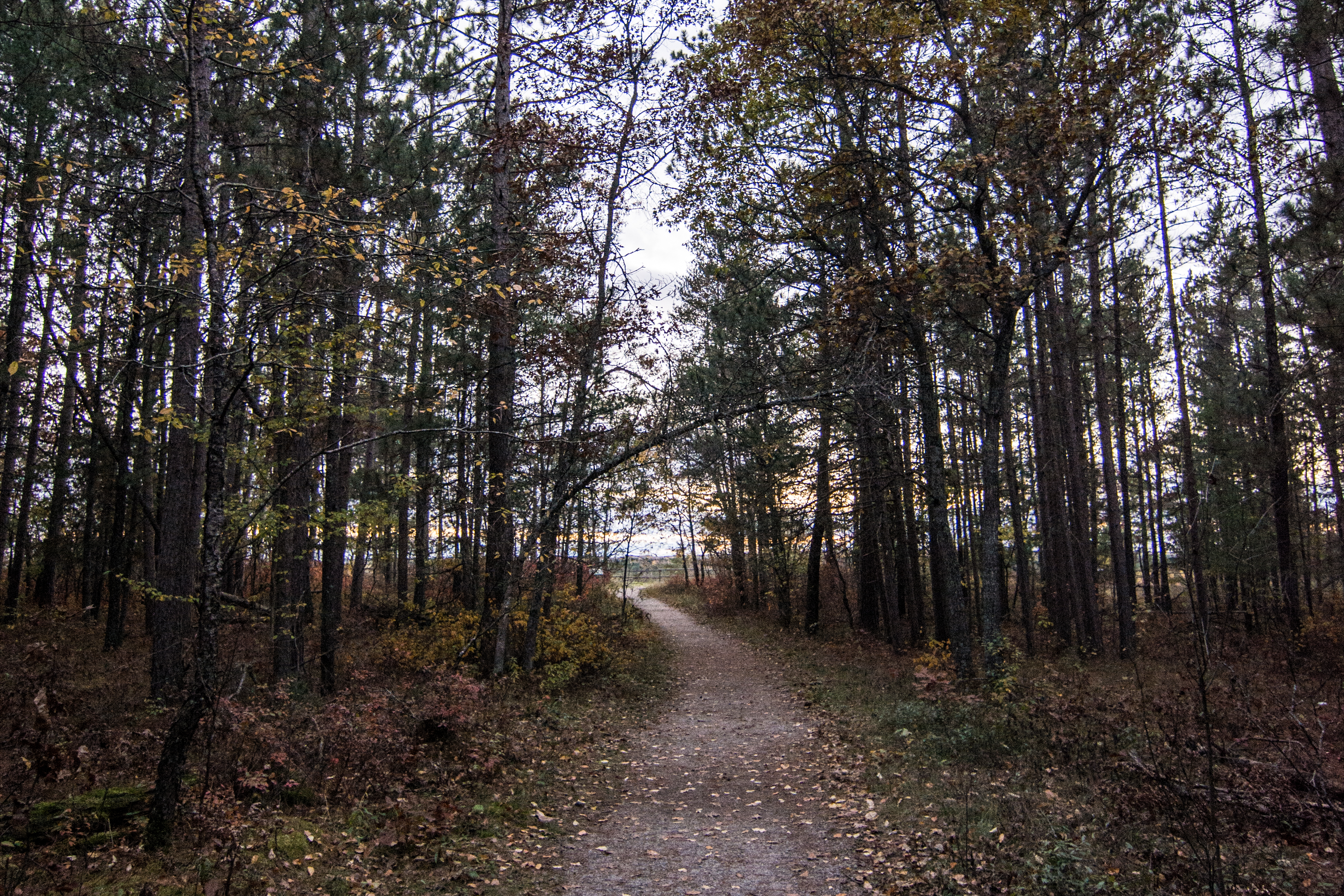
Trail in the Huron National Forest, Michigan

The Huron National Forest is prone to frequent seasonal forest fires, due to ecological and geological factors including the domination of the jack pine in sections the forests, the needles of which are extremely flammable, sandy soil composition as a result of glacial outwash plain geology of sections of the Huron National Forest, and jack pine barrens management practices to create nesting habitat for the Kirtland's warbler resulting in dense, young stands of jack pine that are extremely susceptible to crowning wildfires.

In 2010, the Meridian Boundary Fire burned over 8,500 acres (3,400 ha) in and near the Huron District of the Huron National Forest. The fire destroyed 13 homes, damaged two others, and destroyed or damaged 46 outbuildings.

== Features ==
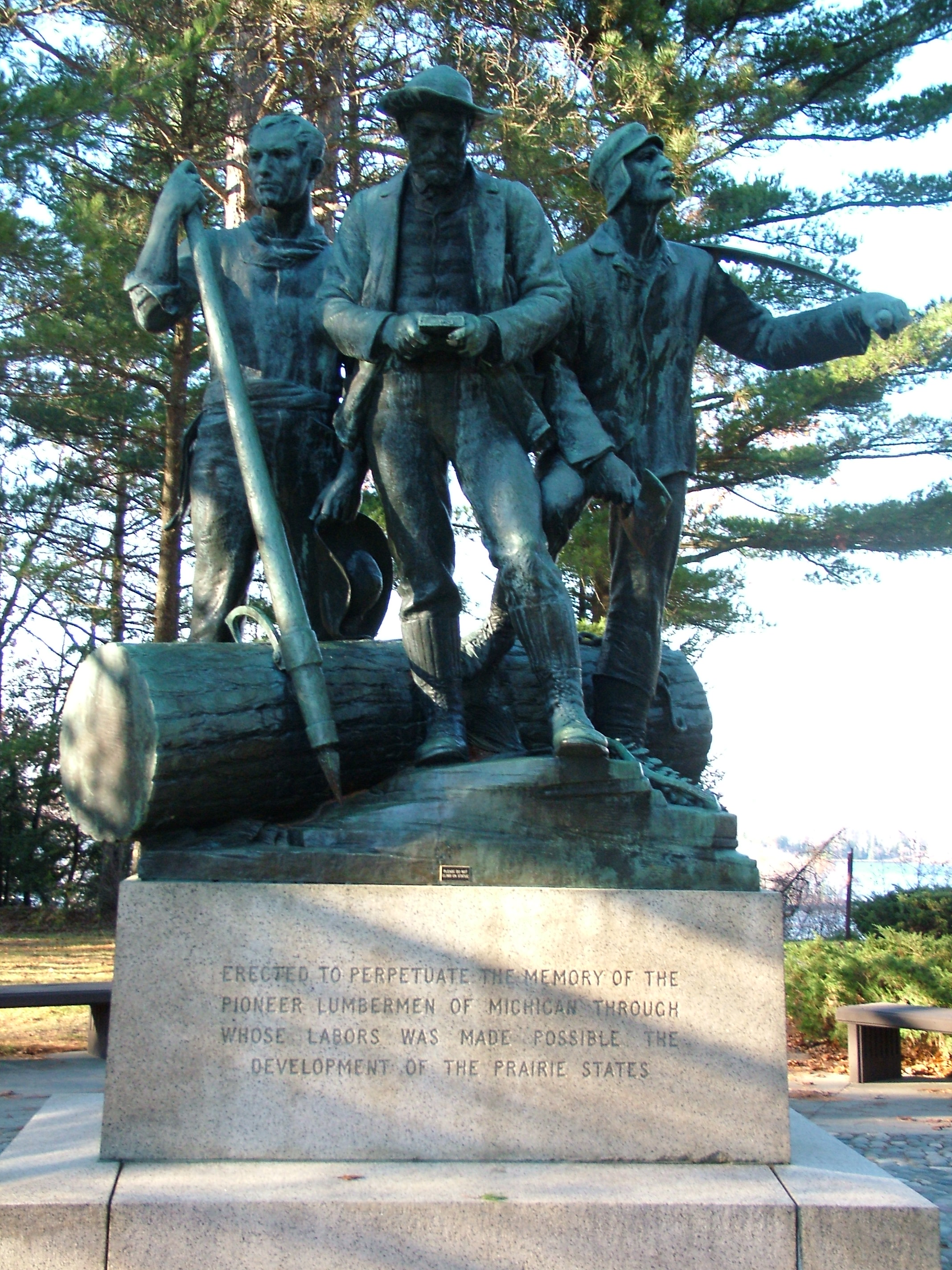
The Lumberman's Monument, dedicated to the workers of the early logging industry, is located within the eastern part of the forest near Oscoda.

The Bull Gap ORV Trail is located in the Huron National Forest. It contains 115 miles (185 km) of off-road vehicle trails.

The threatened Kirtland's warbler nests in the area, and tours are available, subject to time restrictions.

== See also ==
- The Michigan AuSable Valley Railroad is a 16 in (406 mm), 1/4-scale ridable miniature railway, located in Fairview, Michigan.
