= South Bar Lake =

Lake in the state of Michigan, United States

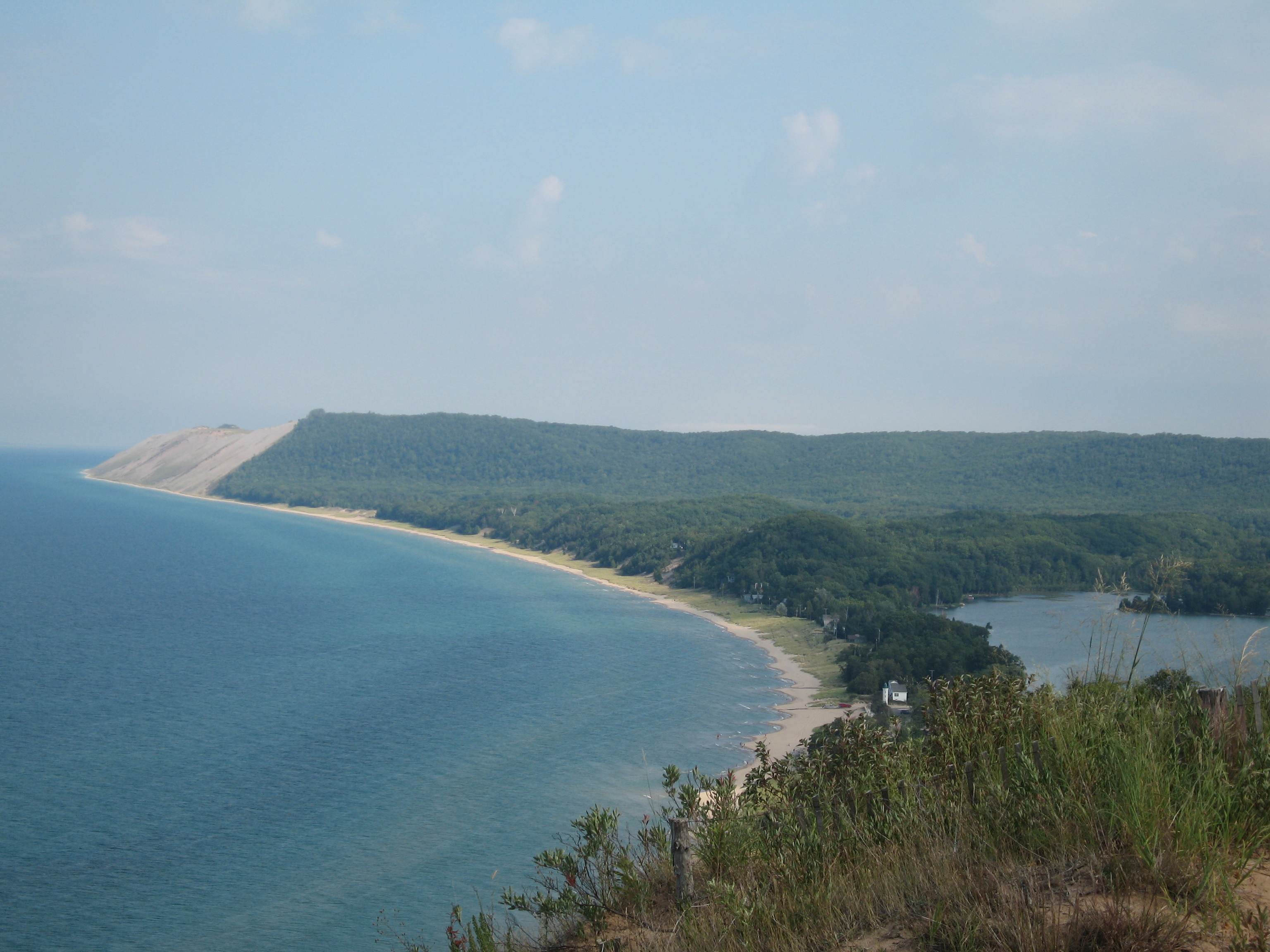
- South Bar Lake (right) and Lake Michigan (left)

- Location within Michigan Location within the United States
- Location: Empire, Michigan, U.S.
- Coordinates: 44°49′09″N 86°03′49″W
- Type: Lake
- Primary outflows: Lake Michigan
- Basin countries: United States
- Surface area: 69 acres (28 ha)
- Max. depth: 13 ft (4.0 m)
- Surface elevation: 581 ft (177 m)

South Bar Lake is located near Empire, Michigan. It is approximately 69 acres (28 ha) in size and has a maximum depth of 13 feet (4.0 m). It is used for recreational purposes, and there is a public swimming beach on the west side of the lake in a village park. The lake contains various fish including bluntnose minnow, largemouth bass, smallmouth bass, yellow perch, Johnny darter, and Iowa darter.

== See also ==
- List of lakes in Michigan
