= Iargo Springs =

Natural spring in Oscoda, Michigan

Coordinates: 44.44106°N 83.67618°W

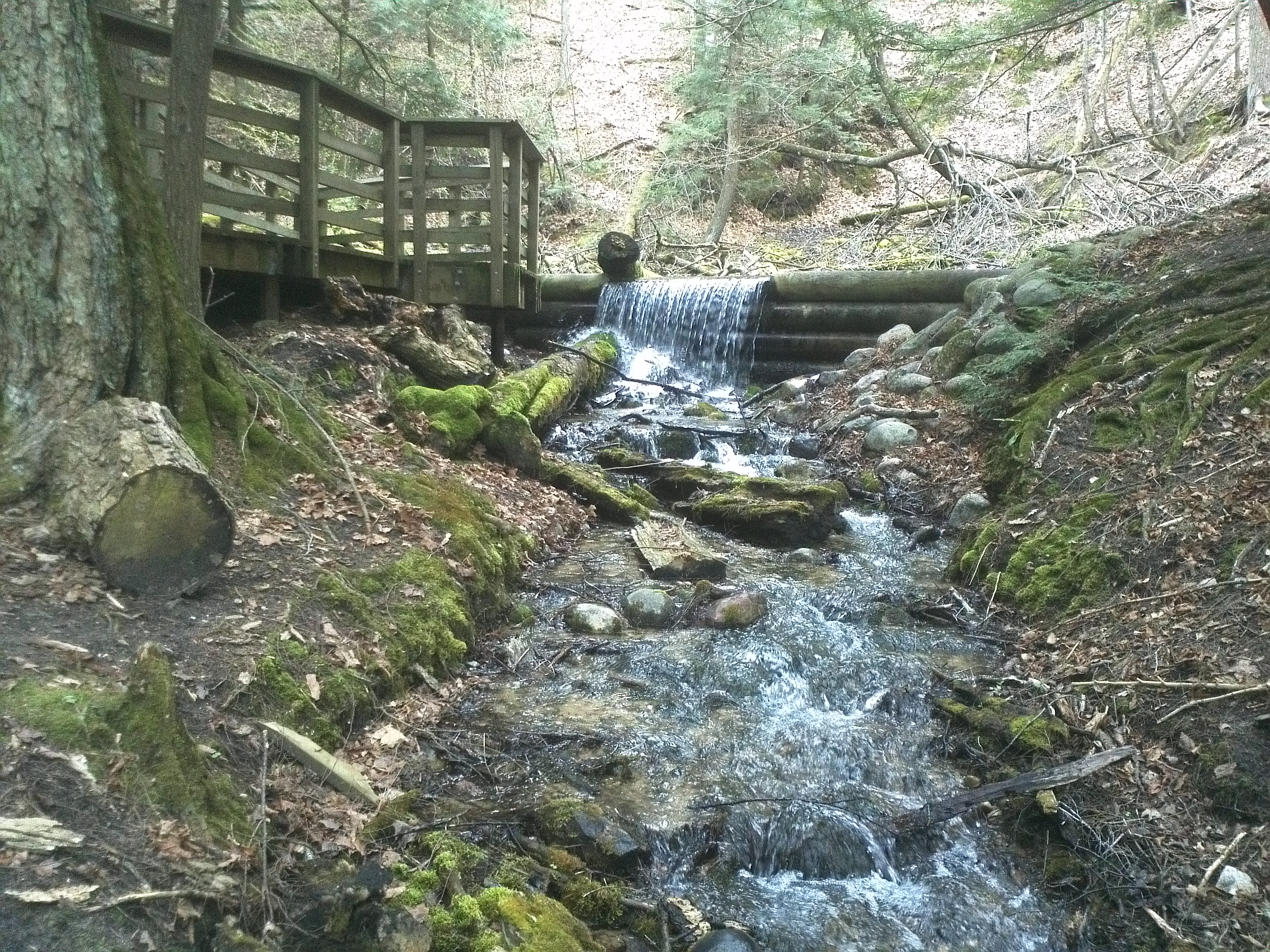
Iargo Springs Oscoda MI

Iargo Springs in Oscoda, Michigan, features several viewing decks and a boardwalk path through the natural springs. Natural springs are formed from water that naturally flows to the surface from underground. The natural springs can be accessed from the road by stairs leading down to the Au Sable River. Man-made barriers pool the springs and create small waterfalls. The wooden boardwalk stretches over 1,000 feet (300 m) as it winds through the natural springs.

Lying off of River Road National Scenic Byway, Iargo Springs provides a panoramic view of the Au Sable River. Used as a drinking water source since pre-settlement times, dams were constructed on the springs by early loggers before the turn of the century. The dams were useful in diverting water to the logging camps nearby. Most of Cooke Pond was dry land then.

Europeans have visited the springs for recreation since the 1920s. A trail to the springs was constructed by the Civilian Conservation Corps in 1934. Early photographs show the dam being repaired and reinforced by the CCC's. The dams lasted until 1981 when a storm took them out. The site was renovated in 1991. Steps were added and boardwalks along the springs, as well as the dams being rebuilt.

The Highbanks Trail has a trailhead here and runs east past Lumberman's Monument. The trail is open year-round but is not groomed in winter. Camping is allowed only in designated areas, and motorized vehicles are prohibited.

Interpretive signs help to teach visitors more about the site and its rich but often troubled history as well as explaining the formation and significance of the transition forest.
