= Huron–Manistee National Forests =

National forest in Michigan, United States

- IUCN category VI (protected area with sustainable use of natural resources)
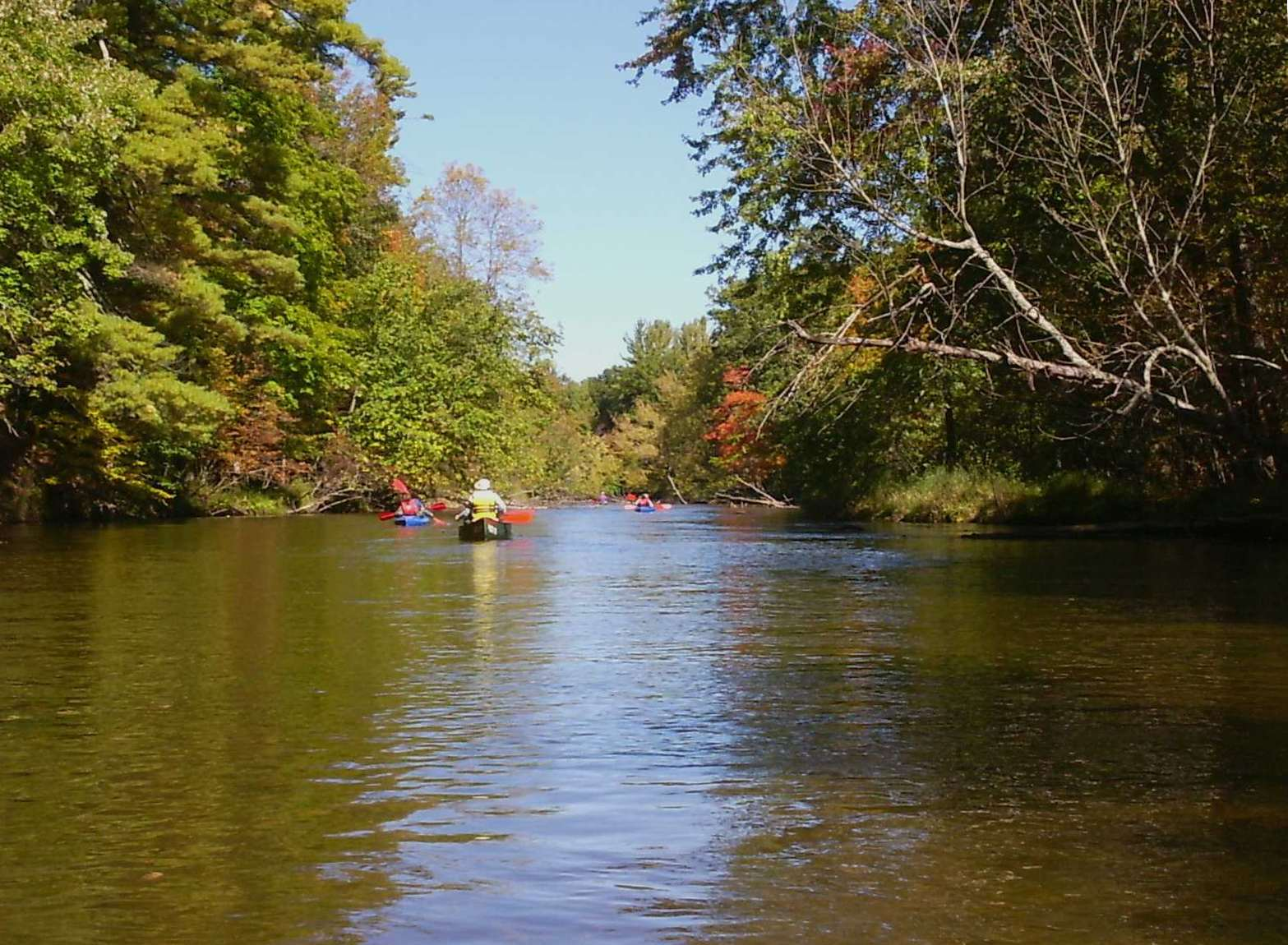
- Canoes on the Pere Marquette River in the Manistee National Forest.

- Map showing National Forests in Michigan.
- Location: Lower Peninsula, Michigan
- Coordinates: Huron 44.57°N 83.99°W; Manistee 43.85°N 85.95°W
- Area: Total - 978,906 acres (3,960 km^{2}); Huron - 438,584 acres (1,770 km^{2}); Manistee - 540,322 acres (2,190 km^{2})
- Established: Huron - 1909; Manistee - 1938
- Governing body: U.S. Forest Service
- Website: Huron–Manistee National Forests

The Huron–Manistee National Forests are two separate national forests, the Huron National Forest and the Manistee National Forest, combined in 1945 for administration purposes and which comprise 978,906 acres (3,960 km^{2}) of public lands, including 5,786 acres (23 km^{2}) of wetlands, extending across the northern lower peninsula of Michigan. The Huron–Manistee National Forests provide many benefits to the public, including clean air and water, recreational opportunities for visitors, habitat for fish and wildlife, and resources for local industry such as timber, minerals, and energy production. The Huron-Manistee National Forest is organized into four separate divisions. The Baldwin/White Cloud District is situated in the central region of the forest. The Manistee/Cadillac District lies in the northwest portion of the forest. The Huron and Tawas/Harrisville District is located on the eastern edge of the forest. The Milo District is positioned in the southern section of the Huron-Manistee National Forest. The headquarters for the forests is in Cadillac, Michigan.

== History ==
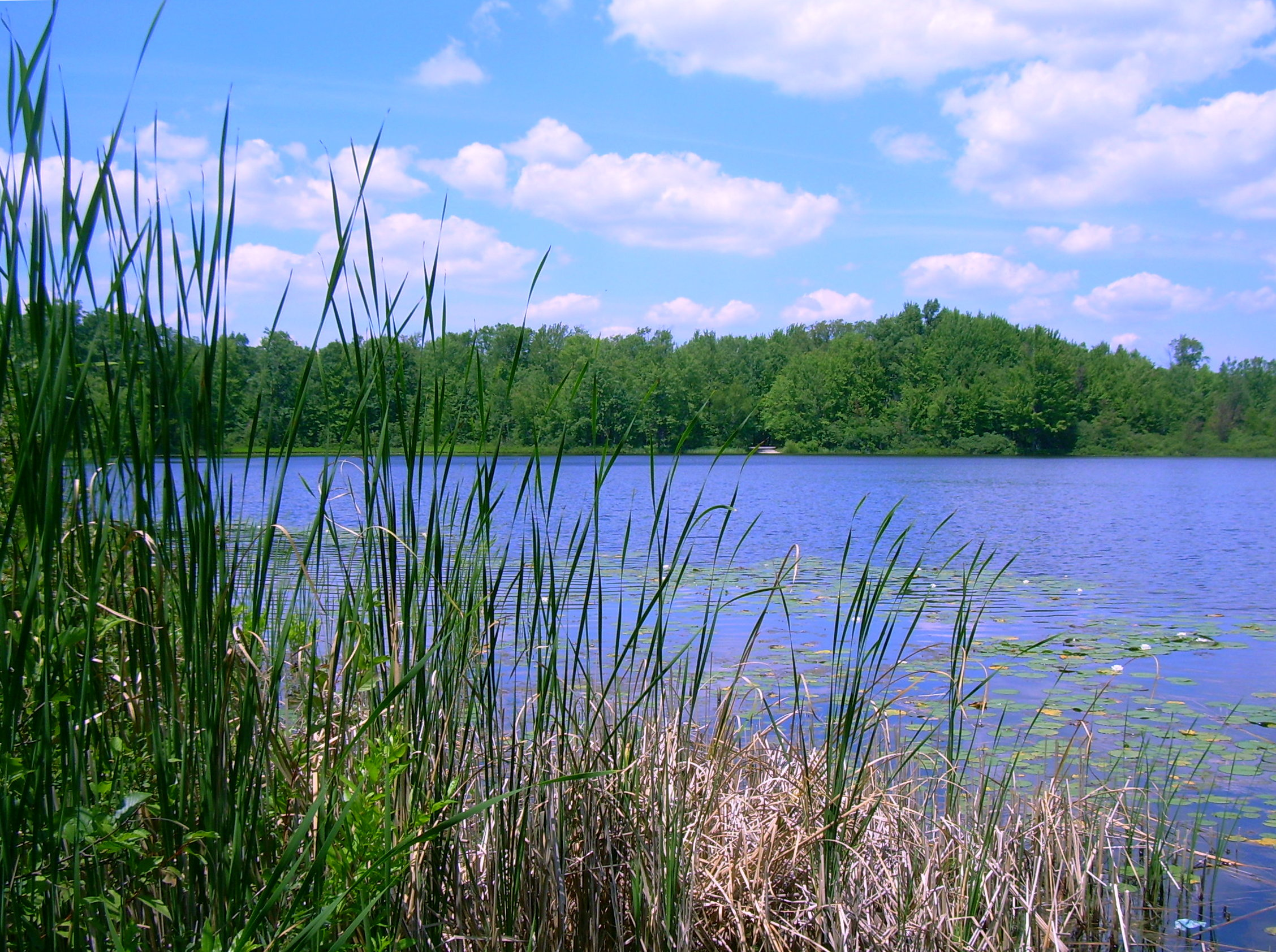
Benton Lake, near the town of Baldwin in the Manistee National Forest

The Huron National Forest was established in 1909 and the Manistee National Forest in 1938. In 1945, they were administratively combined, although they are not adjacent. Huron has about 44.8% of the combined area, whereas the larger Manistee has about 55.2%.

The Huron National Forest is prone to frequent seasonal forest fires, due to ecological and geological factors including the domination of the jack pine in sections of the forests, the needles of which are extremely flammable, sandy soil composition as a result of glacial outwash plain geology of sections of the Huron National Forest, and jack pine barrens management practices to create nesting habitat for the Kirtland's warbler resulting in dense, young stands of jack pine that are extremely susceptible to crowning wildfires.

In 2010, the Meridian Boundary Fire burned over 8,500 acres (3,400 ha) in and near the Huron District of the Huron National Forest. The fire destroyed 13 homes, damaged two others, and destroyed or damaged 46 outbuildings.

== Features ==
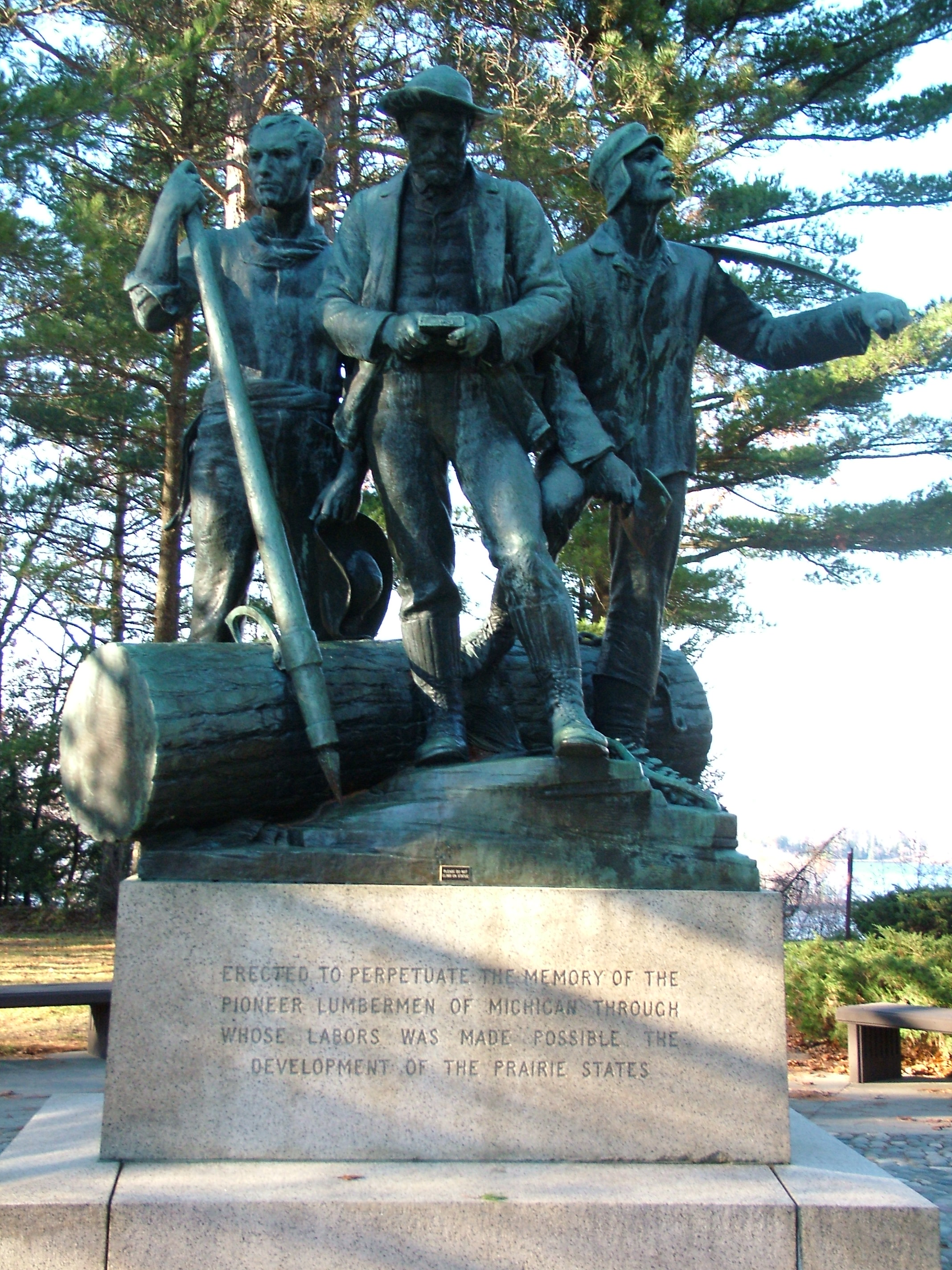
The Lumberman's Monument, dedicated to the workers of the early logging industry, is located within the eastern part of the forest near Oscoda.

The Huron–Manistee National Forests boast an extensive network of waterways, with over 1,800 miles of rivers and 17,000 acres of lakes. The natural features within these waterways create diverse fish and wildlife habitats while offering many outdoor recreational opportunities. The Huron-Manistee National Forest is home to eight substantial river basins: the Pine, Manistee, Little Manistee, Pentwater, Big Sable, Pere Marquette, Muskegon, and White Rivers. The nationally known Pere Marquette and Au Sable Rivers offer quality canoeing and fishing. Additionally, over 330 miles (531 km) of trails are available for hiking.

The Huron-Manistee National Forests offer a vast range of outdoor activities, including hiking, camping, hunting, and fishing. Visitors also enjoy picnicking, canoeing, snowmobiling, scenic drives, off-road vehicle adventures, and harvesting natural resources. The Huron–Manistee National Forest features numerous developed spaces for outdoor enjoyment, including campgrounds, picnic areas, scenic observation spots, visitor centers, and various facilities designed to enhance outdoor experiences. The Huron–Manistee National Forests are an attraction to many campers. Most developed campgrounds offer amenities such as restrooms, fire rings, and picnic tables. These sites often require a reservation and typically have a fee for use. Tent camping in the forest, whether dispersed or primitive, is generally permitted in most areas unless specific restrictions are in place. Additionally, no fees are required for dispersed camping. A wood permit is required to cut firewood.

The Manistee National Forest portion is located in northwest lower Michigan. It has varying but largely sandy terrain covered with trees. There are numerous lakes and frontage on Lake Michigan. The area is popular for fishing, camping, boating, snowmobiling, cross-country skiing and hunting. The North Country Trail passes through it. It has a total area of 540,187 acres (2,190 km^{2}). In descending order of land area it lies in parts of Lake, Newaygo, Wexford, Manistee, Mason, Oceana, Muskegon, Mecosta, and Montcalm counties. There are local ranger district offices located in Baldwin and Wellston at the historic Chittenden Nursery location.

The Manistee National Forest is not one continuous mass but is broken by private property and towns. Much of the land had been abandoned by logging companies after being logged off a century ago. The Lumberjack 100, a 100-mile ultra-endurance mountain bike race is held annually within its bounds.

The Nordhouse Dunes Wilderness is a unique feature in the Manistee portion. This relatively small area of 3,450 acres (14 km^{2}), situated on the east shore of Lake Michigan is one of the two designated wilderness areas in Michigan, and one of few in the U.S. with an extensive lake shore dunes ecosystem. Most of the dunes are 3500 to 4000 years old and some stand about 140 feet (43 m) higher than the lake. The Nordhouse Dunes are interspersed with woody vegetation such as juniper, jack pine and hemlock. There are many small water holes and marshes dotting the landscape and dune grass covers many of the dunes. The beach is wide and sandy. There are two trailheads to access Nordhouse Dunes: from the north at the Lake Michigan Recreation Site and from the south off Nurmberg Road.

The Huron National Forest portion is in northeast lower Michigan. It has a total area of 438,538 acres (1,770 km^{2}). It lies in parts of Oscoda, Alcona, Iosco, Crawford, and Ogemaw counties. There are local ranger district offices in Mio and Oscoda.

The Huron-Manistee National Forest offers approximately 6,997 miles of primitive scenic roads as well as 3,730 miles of forest system roads designed for off-road motor vehicle use. The Manistee portion of the forest has four separate trail systems designed for off-road recreational activities. The Cedar Creek Motorsport Trail, located near Twin Lake, is a 24-mile (38 km) single-track trail designed for ORV use and runs along Pine Creek with predominantly flat and rolling terrain. The Holton Motorcycle Trail is a 28-mile (45 km) trail located near the village of Holton, which weaves through dense oak-pine forest and is designed for ORV use. The Horseshoe Motorcycle Trail, located near Hesperia is a 32-mile (51 km) trail surrounded by oak forest with an understory of grass and ferns and designed for ORV use. The Michigan Cross-Country Cycle Trail is a 177-mile (284 km) trail located near the village of Baldwin, that traverses much of the Manistee Forest through heavily forested areas, rolling hills, open meadows, and grassy understories. The Bull Gap ORV Trail is located in the Huron portion of the forests. It contains 115 miles (185 km) of ORV trails.

The Huron-Manistee National Forest is home to five federally listed threatened and endangered species, including the Bald Eagle, Indiana bat, Karner blue butterfly, and Pitcher's thistle. The threatened Kirtland's warbler nests in the area, and tours are available, subject to time restrictions.

== See also ==
- List of national forests of the United States
- Michigan AuSable Valley Railroad
- Nordhouse Dunes Wilderness
