= Empire School (Empire, Michigan) =

- U.S. National Register of Historic Places
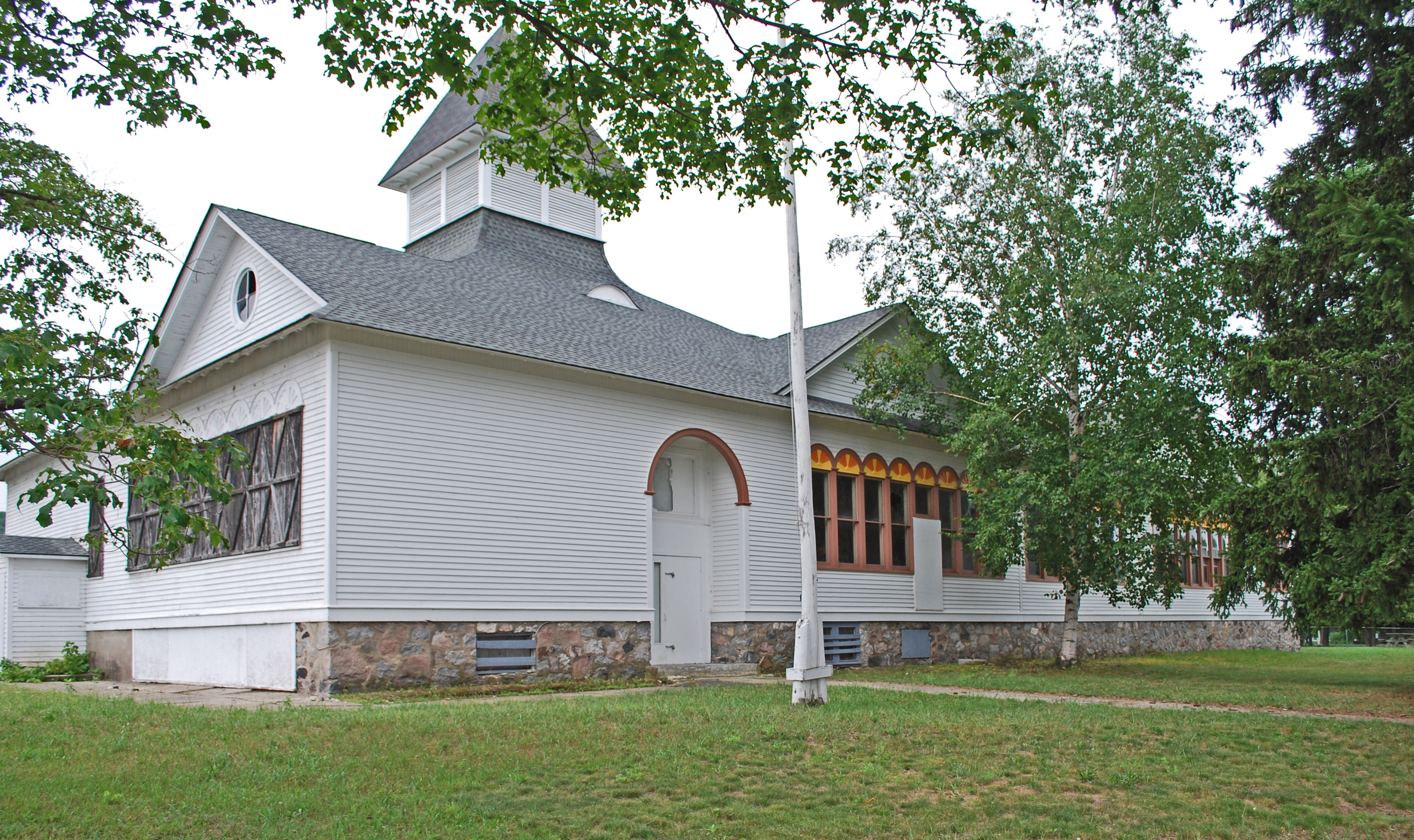

- Location within Michigan Location within the United States
- Interactive map
- Location: 10017 W. Front St., Empire, Michigan
- Coordinates: 44°48′39″N 86°3′32″W
- Area: 1.1 acres (0.45 ha)
- Built: 1900 1905
- Built by: George Snell
- Architectural style: Late Victorian
- NRHP reference No.: 08000222
- Added to NRHP: March 27, 2008

The Empire School is a school building located at 10017 West Front Street in Empire, Michigan.

== History ==
The first school in Empire was the schooner "The Empire," from which the town derives its name. The schooner was icebound in the Empire harbor during the winter of 1865. In 1867, a permanent school building was constructed on Brotherton Road. A new two-story school was constructed in 1891. This school, however, was destroyed by fire in 1899. As a stopgap, classes were held in the Maccabees Hall until a replacement school could be built.

The district decided their new school should be a top-quality, four-room schoolhouse. A new site was purchased, and construction began in 1900, with an initial payment to contractor George Snell. The new Empire School was completed in 1901. A gymnasium was added in 1932, using funds available from the Works Progress Administration. An old machinery storage shed was moved to the school property to house shop classes. In 1941, a small school building, the Boynton school, was moved from its original location to the Empire School to provide space for kindergarten classes.

However, school enrollment was declining. In 1958, several local school districts, including Empire, consolidated to form Glen Lake Community Schools. By 1968, the Empire School shut its doors. A series of owners purchased the property for speculative ventures, and it was re-roofed in 2004, but the ventures did not pan out. It was listed on the National Register of Historic Places in 2008. As of 2017, a local group was attempting to convert the school into a community center.

== Description ==
The Empire School is a 10,000 sq ft (930 m^{2}) L-plan single story structure, and includes four classrooms and a gymnasium. It clad in clapboard. The school contains two sections: the original section is a square-plan building containing the four classrooms. This section has a hipped roof with a smaller gable at each end and square cupola in the center. The main entrance to the building is off-center in the north facade. The second section, containing the gymnasium, is a rectangular, gable-roof addition to the original building.
