= Bull Gap =

Hill climb area in Michigan

Coordinates: 44.61696°N 84.02894°W

Bull Gap is a 60-acre (240,000 m^{2}) hill climb area located in Michigan, and links over 115 miles (185 km) of trails for legal off-road vehicle (ORV) use.

== Description ==
Bull Gap Hill itself is a sand dune centrally located within the 115-mile (185 km) Bull Gap trail system. This system is composed mainly of 50-inch-wide (1,300 mm) one-way sand and loose dirt trails. The trails twist through predominantly public land and link the cities of Luzerne, Michigan, McKinley, Michigan, Mio, Michigan, and South Branch, Michigan. Each of these communities has passed local ordinances legalizing the use of ATVs on the shoulders of most public roads and offer trail users easy access to food, fuel, lodging, and the occasional adult beverage. The hill is this trail system's most popular waypoint and meeting place. It offers a large open area with the opportunity to push the limits of an off-road vehicle and challenge friends or compete with strangers to an up-hill drag race.

== Location ==
Bull Gap is located in the vicinity of Mio, Michigan. Mio is about 30 miles (48 km) due East of Grayling, Michigan and about 30 miles (48 km) due North of West Branch, Michigan. The majority of the trail system is contained within the Huron-Manistee National Forest and has parts of the Au Sable River passing through. The Huron-Manistee National Forest, in the northern part of Michigan's Lower Peninsula, an opportunity to ride off-road vehicles on forest trails.

== Rules and regulations ==
According to the Michigan Hand Book of Off-Road Vehicle Laws, "Michigan law defines an ORV as any motor vehicle that can be operated cross-country (without benefit of a road or trail) over land, snow, and other natural terrain. This includes: multi-track or multi-wheeled vehicles; all-terrain vehicles (ATVs); motorcycles or related multi-wheeled vehicles; amphibious machines (water-to-land and back); hovercraft; and other vehicles that use mechanical power including 2- or 4-wheel-drive vehicles that are highway registered but operated off highways or off roads." This trail system is also patrolled to ensure that all ORV operators and all passengers wear a U.S. Department of Transportation– approved crash helmet and protective eyewear or goggles except when the ORV is equipped with an approved roof and the operator and passengers are wearing properly adjusted and fastened safety belts. Also, each rider must utilize a U.S. Forest Service–approved spark arrestor and muffler in good working condition, in constant operation, and meeting applicable sound-level standards. Finally, a State of Michigan ORV sticker must be purchased on a yearly basis and clearly displayed on each vehicle.

== User reviews ==
In an interview conducted on Monday, February 16, 2009, Mr. Jonathan S. Byrd said, "Bull Gap's trail systems are some of the best trails in the great lakes area. The diversity of the scenery and wildlife make every trip an adventure. Having traveled to other states and explored various trail systems the Bull Gap trail systems are by far some of the most enjoyable to experience."

In an interview conducted on Wednesday, February 18, 2009, Mrs. Christine L. Baker said, "Out of all the trails I have ever ridden Bull Gap is by far my favorite. The Sandy Soil is very forgiving and there are lots of nice changes in elevation."

And finally, on February, 18, 2009, Mr. Randall M Baker said, "Bull Gap is one of the best places to off-road in the state. It has a wide variety of trail types ranging from open fast and straight to tight, twisty, slow and dangerous. The DNR grades it about once a month but that does not stop some areas from getting extremely bumpy and dipped-out. The only other major downfall of the trail system is the dust. During the hot dry summer months the entire area can get extremely dusty making it sometimes difficult to see five feet ahead of you. As long as you are well prepared this system can provide days of enjoyment for everyone from the beginner dirt bike rider to those with advanced bike or ATV riding skills."

== Other local recreation options ==
The Huron-Manistee National Forests comprise almost 1,000,000 acres (4,000 km^{2}) of public lands extending across the northern lower peninsula of Michigan. The Huron-Manistee National Forests provide recreation opportunities for visitors, habitat for fish and wildlife, and resources for local industry. In 1909, the Huron National Forest was established, and the Manistee National Forest was formed in 1938.

In 1945, these two National Forests were administratively combined. Working hand in hand with the Michigan Department of Natural Resources and other partners, the Forest Service has changed the "lands that nobody wanted" to healthy forests again. This forest offers the general public the opportunity to camp, hike, snowmobile, boat/canoe, sightsee, fish, hunt, cross-country ski, bike or hike. Visit the state forests website for more information.
