= Empire, Michigan =

- Village
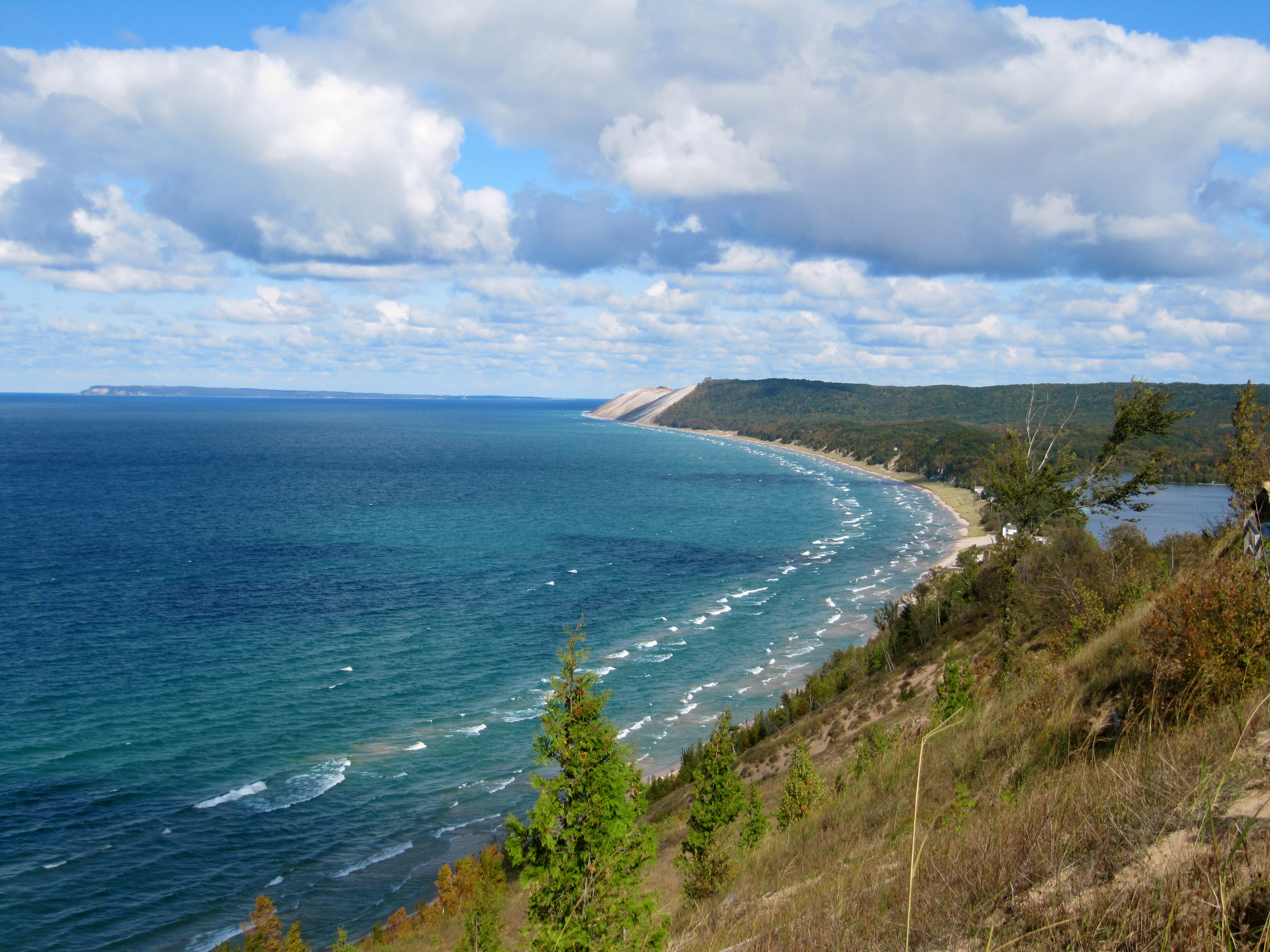
- View of Sleeping Bear Dunes from Empire Bluffs

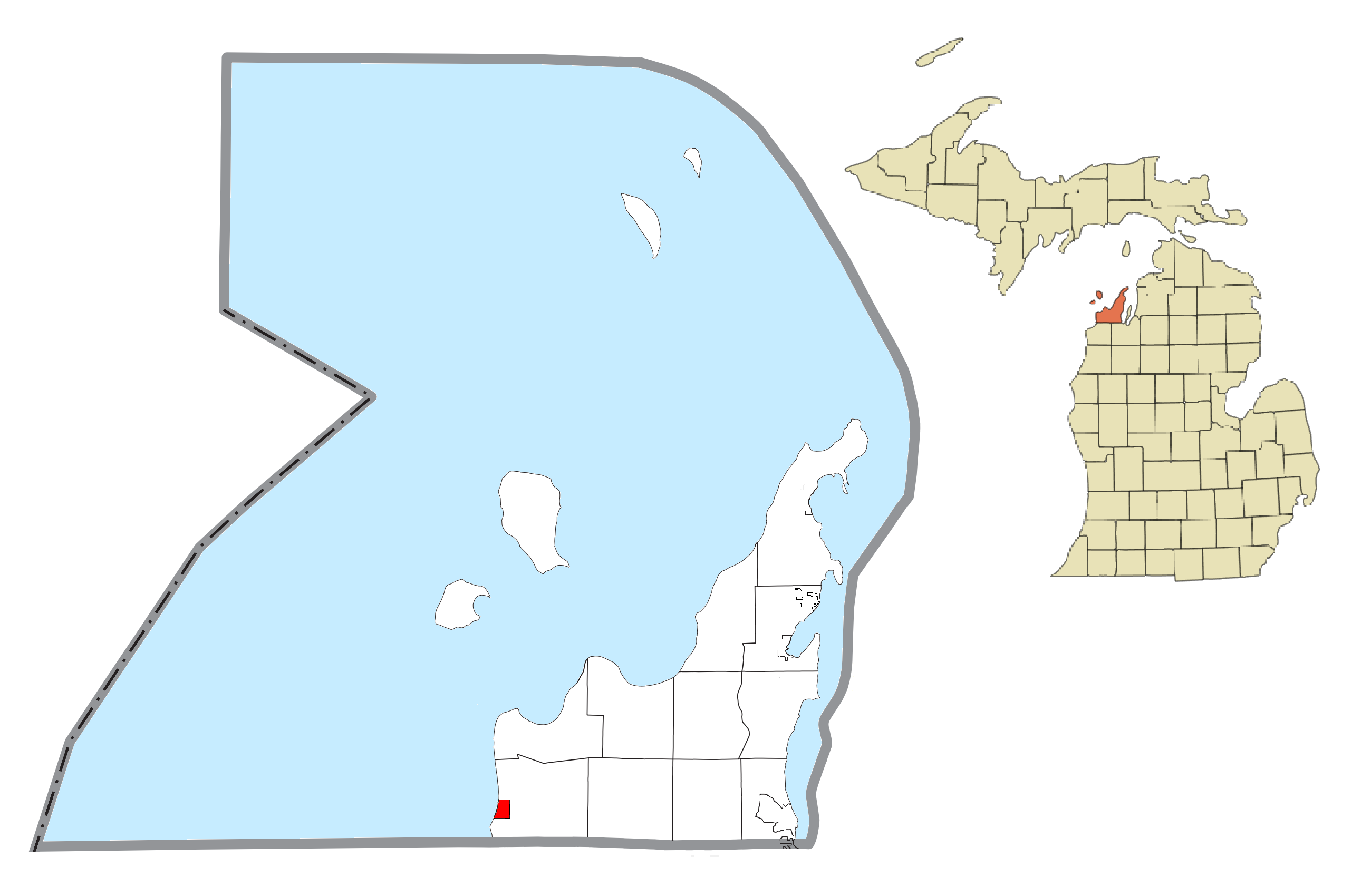
- Location within Leelanau County

- Location within the state of Michigan
- Coordinates: 44°48′39″N 86°0′33″W
- Country: United States
- State: Michigan
- County: Leelanau
- Township: Empire

Area
  - Total: 1.12 sq mi (2.90 km^{2})
  - Land: 1.03 sq mi (2.66 km^{2})
  - Water: 0.093 sq mi (0.24 km^{2})
- Elevation: 610 ft (186 m)

Population (2020)
  - Total: 362
  - Density: 352.0/sq mi (135.89/km^{2})
- Time zone: UTC-5 (Eastern (EST))
  - Summer (DST): UTC-4 (EDT)
- ZIP code(s): 49630
- Area code: 231
- FIPS code: 26-25980
- GNIS feature ID: 0625588
- Website: www.leelanau.cc/empirevillage.asp

Empire is a village on Lake Michigan in the northwestern Lower Peninsula of Michigan in the United States. Located in southwestern Leelanau County, its population was 362 at the 2020 census. The village is located within Empire Township, and is famous for its proximity to the Sleeping Bear Dunes National Lakeshore. Empire is home to the lakeshore's headquarters, the Philip A. Hart Visitor Center.

== History ==
Empire was founded in 1851. It was incorporated as a village in 1895 with E. R. Dailey, the head of the Empire Lumber Company which was the main employer here, as the first president of the village. The city was named after the schooner "Empire", which was icebound in the city during a storm in 1865.

The Empire Lumber Company operated from 1887 to 1917, dominating this once booming lumber town. George Aylsworth operated the first mill between 1873 and 1883. Potter and Struthers built a second mill in 1885, which T. Wilce Company purchased in 1887. Called the Empire Lumber Company, it expanded to one of the largest and best equipped hardwood mills in the area, capable of producing up to 20 million feet of lumber a year. Docks, several businesses, and a railroad sprang up in Empire. Destroyed by fire in 1906, the mill was quickly rebuilt. The mill burned again in 1917. With most of the nearby virgin timber gone, the mill was not replaced.

The local Robert H. Manning Memorial Light was built in 1991 by O'Brien Brothers Construction as a memorial to Robert H. Manning, a lifelong resident of Empire and avid fisherman. Additionally, the beach has an antique anchor which was discovered by Douglas Manning, son of Robert H. Manning, and Michelle Stryker in 1977. Every year, the village of Empire celebrates the raising of the anchor on the third Saturday in July.

== Geography ==
Situated approximately 22 miles (35 km) due west of Traverse City, Empire is located in the center of the Sleeping Bear Dunes National Lakeshore. The Empire Bluffs lie to the south and the sand dunes of the National Lakeshore lie to the north. The area has views of the dunes, North Manitou and South Manitou islands, and Lake Michigan. Most Sleeping Bear Dunes panoramas portrayed on postcards are taken from a walking trail which runs to the top of the Empire Bluffs. A wide beach separates Lake Michigan from its close neighbor, South Bar Lake. The much smaller South Bar Lake stays considerably warmer than the big lake during the summer months.

The small village of Empire is located up a short hill, just a few minutes walk from the beach.

== Geography ==
According to the United States Census Bureau, the village has a total area of 1.24 square miles (3.21 km^{2}), of which 1.15 square miles (2.98 km^{2}) is land and 0.09 square miles (0.23 km^{2}) is water. Empire is considered to be part of Northern Michigan.

=== Geographic features ===
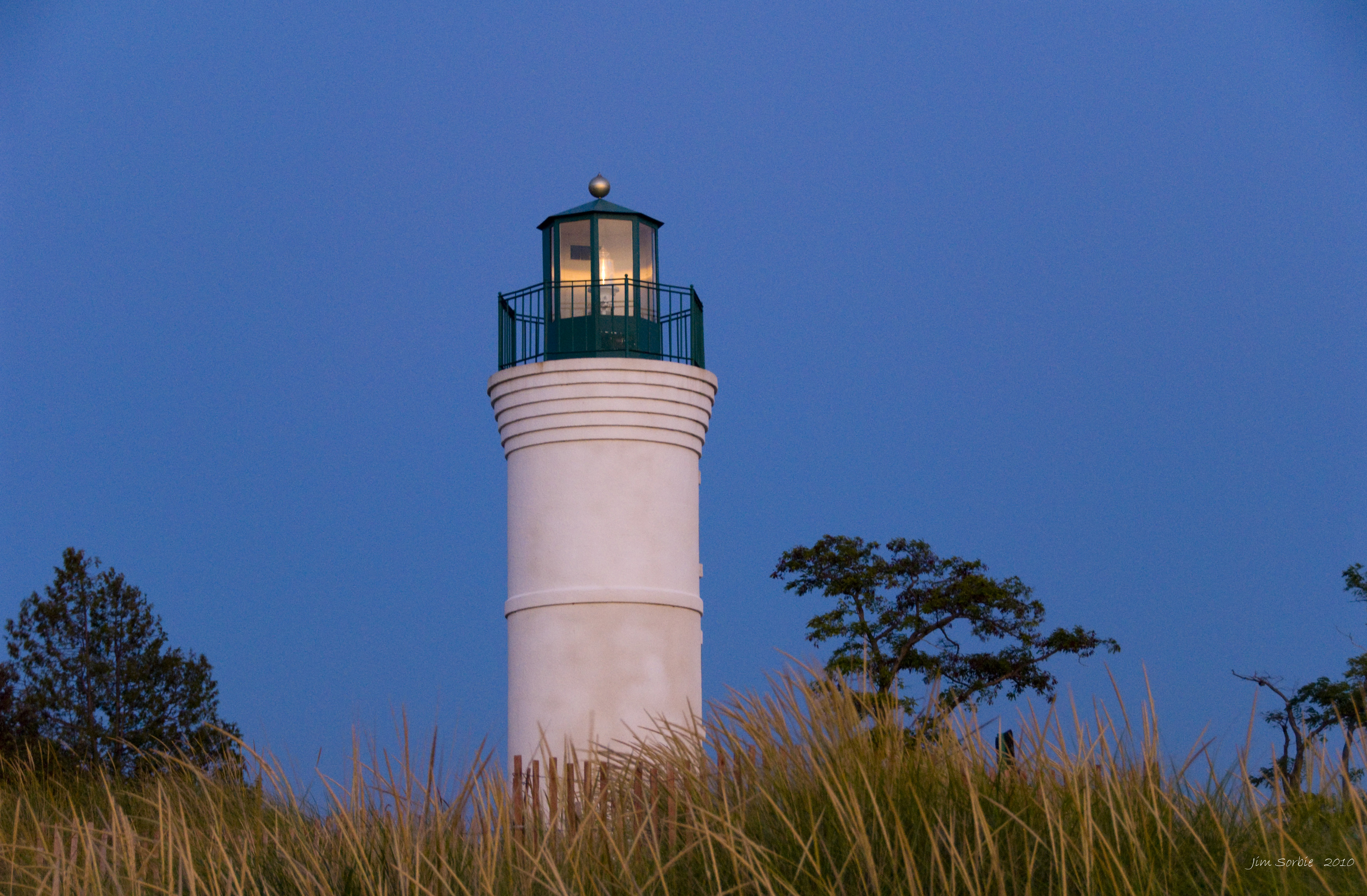
Robert H. Manning Memorial Lighthouse

- South Bar Lake
- Lake Michigan

=== Major highways ===
- M-22 runs north–south through the village, further in each direction along the Lake Michigan coast.
- M-72 has its western terminus in Empire, running east across Michigan's Lower Peninsula until reaching US 23 on the Lake Huron coast, in Harrisville. Along its route, M-72 also runs through Traverse City, Kalkaska, Grayling, and Mio.

== Demographics ==
Historical population
Census	Pop.	Note	%±
1900	609		—
1910	578		−5.1%
1920	298		−48.4%
1930	302		1.3%
1940	266		−11.9%
1950	251		−5.6%
1960	448		78.5%
1970	409		−8.7%
1980	340		−16.9%
1990	355		4.4%
2000	378		6.5%
2010	375		−0.8%
2020	362		−3.5%
U.S. Decennial Census

=== 2010 census ===
As of the census of 2010, there were 375 people, 211 households, and 103 families living in the village. The population density was 326.1 inhabitants per square mile (125.9/km^{2}). There were 347 housing units at an average density of 301.7 per square mile (116.5/km^{2}). The racial makeup of the village was 99.2% White and 0.8% Native American. Hispanic or Latino of any race were 0.8% of the population.

There were 211 households, of which 12.8% had children under the age of 18 living with them, 40.8% were married couples living together, 6.2% had a female householder with no husband present, 1.9% had a male householder with no wife present, and 51.2% were non-families. 46.9% of all households were made up of individuals, and 18.4% had someone living alone who was 65 years of age or older. The average household size was 1.78 and the average family size was 2.50.

The median age in the village was 56.8 years. 13.3% of residents were under the age of 18; 2.2% were between the ages of 18 and 24; 16.8% were from 25 to 44; 38.1% were from 45 to 64; and 29.6% were 65 years of age or older. The gender makeup of the village was 45.6% male and 54.4% female.

=== 2000 census ===
As of the census of 2000, there were 378 people, 187 households, and 104 families living in the village. The population density was 328.5 inhabitants per square mile (126.8/km^{2}). There were 276 housing units at an average density of 239.8 per square mile (92.6/km^{2}). The racial makeup of the village was 98.94% White, 0.26% Native American, 0.26% Asian, and 0.53% from two or more races.

There were 187 households, out of which 16.6% had children under the age of 18 living with them, 47.1% were married couples living together, 5.9% had a female householder with no husband present, and 43.9% were non-families. 39.6% of all households were made up of individuals, and 16.6% had someone living alone who was 65 years of age or older. The average household size was 2.02 and the average family size was 2.70.

In the village, the population was spread out, with 15.6% under the age of 18, 6.3% from 18 to 24, 19.3% from 25 to 44, 35.2% from 45 to 64, and 23.5% who were 65 years of age or older. The median age was 49 years. For every 100 females, there were 94.8 males. For every 100 females age 18 and over, there were 96.9 males.

The median income for a household in the village was $39,722, and the median income for a family was $52,813. Males had a median income of $31,042 versus $24,250 for females. The per capita income for the village was $27,850. About 2.7% of families and 7.4% of the population were below the poverty line, including 7.8% of those under age 18 and 6.0% of those age 65 or over.

== U.S. Air Force (Empire Air Force Station) ==
For many years, the village was host to many servicewomen and men stationed at Empire Air Force Station. This was mainly a radar site during the Cold War. Its main function was to protect the northern skies of the United States from military threats. In its later years, the site was turned over to the Federal Aviation Administration. Though much of the site is gone now, there is a museum and historical marker in the village. There is an annual reunion of members of Empire AFS.

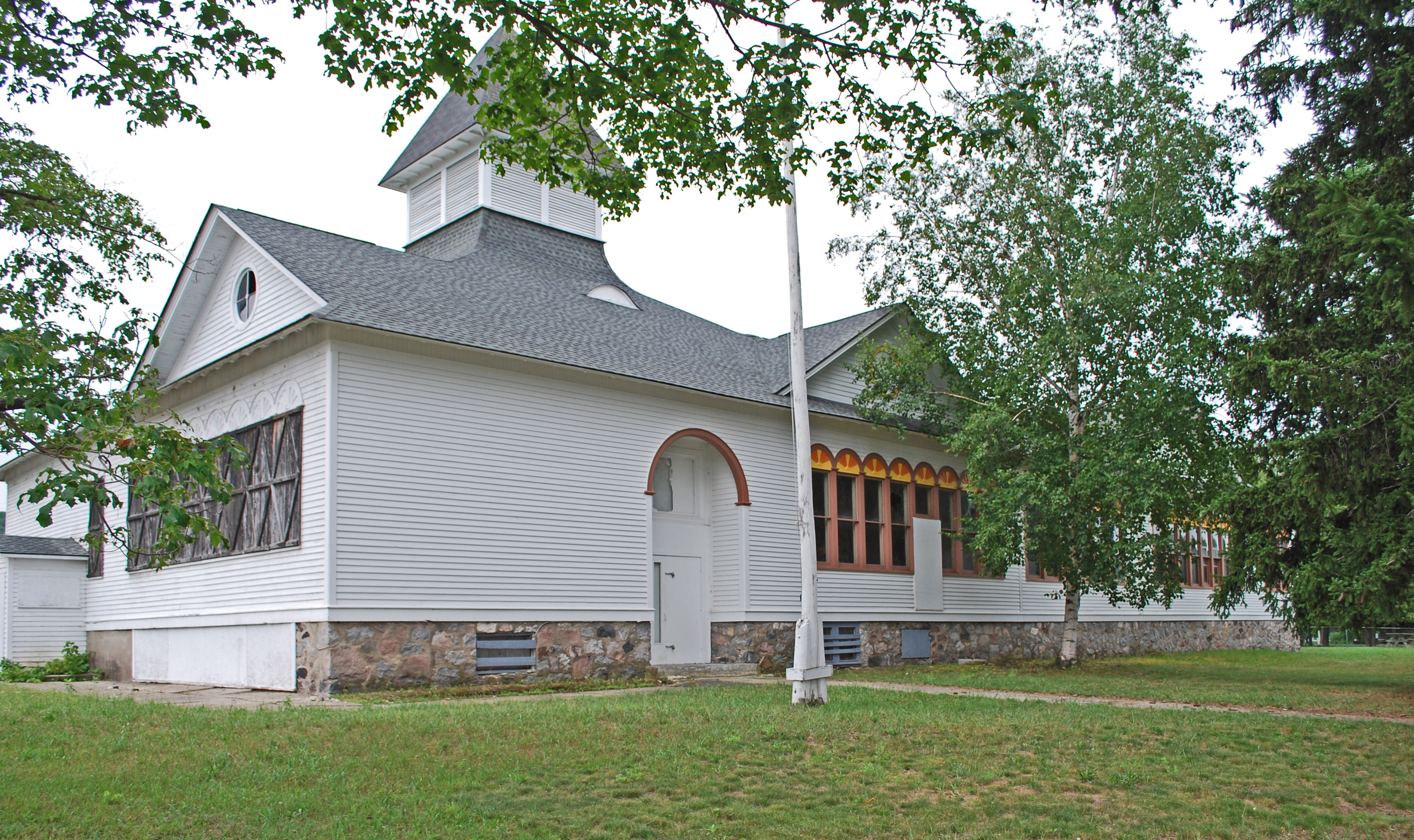
Empire School

== Local attractions ==
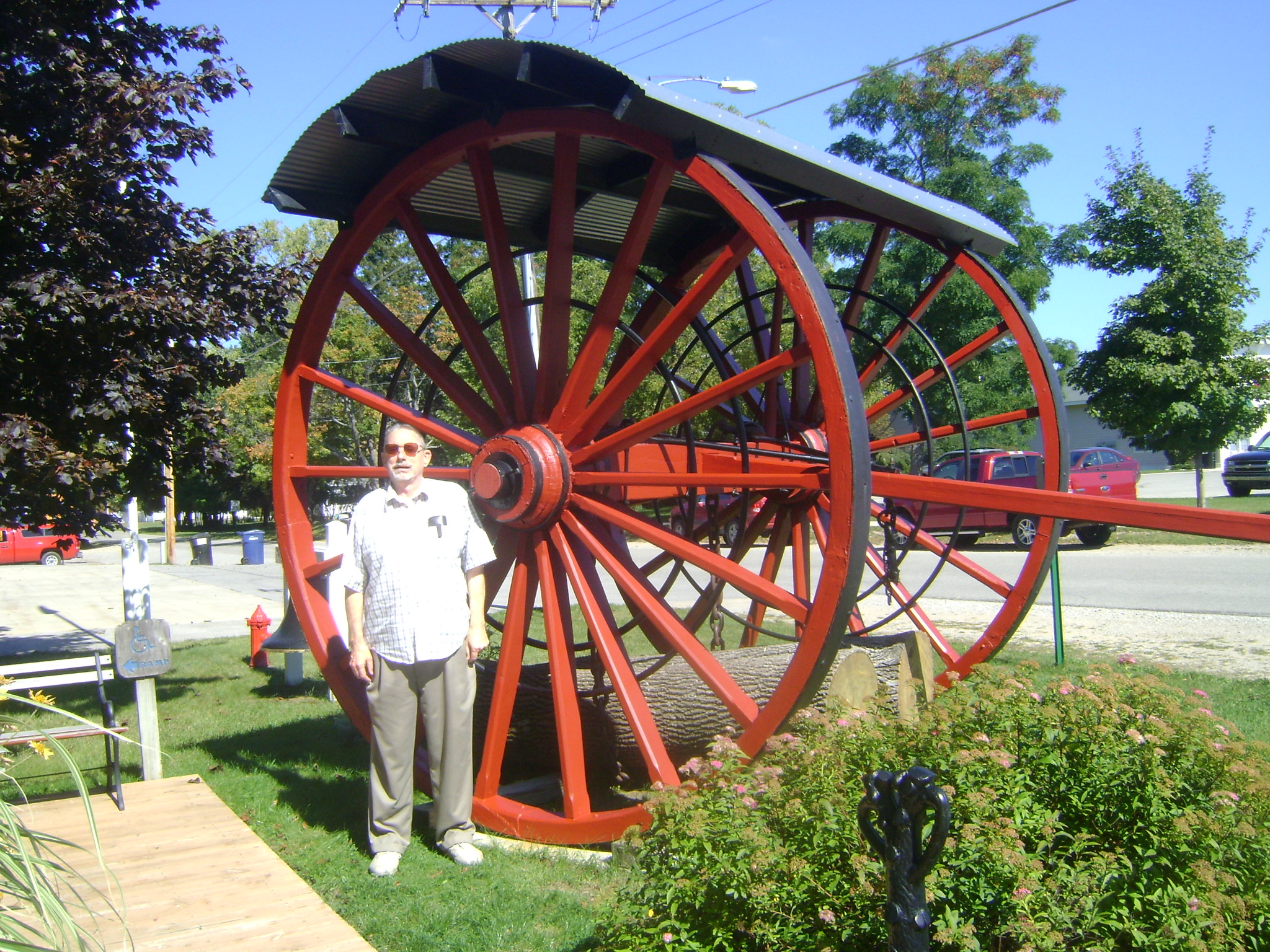
Michigan logging wheels at the Empire Area Museum

- Michigan Shore to Shore Riding & Hiking Trail runs from Empire passes through Grayling and on to Oscoda, and points north and south. It is a 500-mile (800 km) interconnected system of trails.
- Empire Bluff Trail
- Philip A. Hart Visitor Center for Sleeping Bear Dunes National Lakeshore
- Empire Area Historical Museum Complex
- Gilbert the T-Rex

There are a number of recurring local events. A calendar is available.

- The Empire Winterfest, held each year in mid-February has been celebrated for the past twenty-five years. Events include ice skating, curling and the polar bear dip into South Bar Lake. There is also a pool tournament held in the Empire Village Inn (known to locals simply as "The V.I.") and a pancake breakfast put on by the Empire Lion's Club in the Empire town hall.
- Empire is the former home of the Dunegrass Festival. A three-day music festival featuring folk and bluegrass groups, as well as a multitude of stands from local artisans and business owners. It is now held a short distance away outside of the village.
- Empire Heritage Days (2nd weekend in October).
- Empire Asparagus Festival (3rd weekend in May—weekend before Memorial Day weekend).
- Empire Hops Festival (1st Saturday in October)
