= Lumberman's Monument =

Bronze statue in Michigan, US

Coordinates: 44°26′7.5″N 83°37′28.7″W

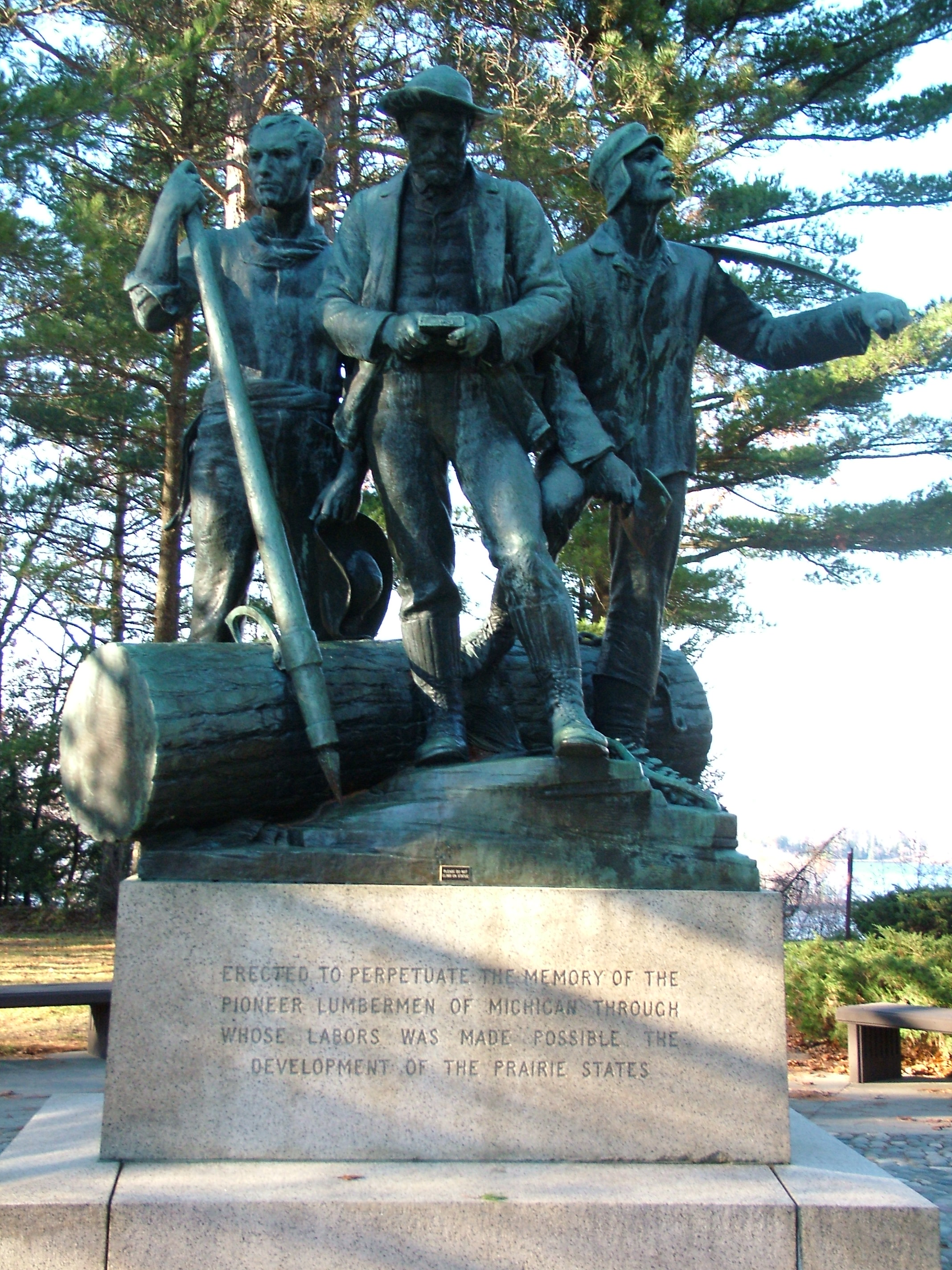
14-foot bronze statue by Robert Ingersoll Aitken

Lumberman's Monument is a monument in Oscoda Township, Michigan, United States. It is dedicated to the workers of the early logging industry in Michigan. Standing at 14 feet (4.27 m), the bronze statue by Robert Ingersoll Aitken features a log surrounded by three figures: a timber cruiser holding a compass, a sawyer with his saw slung over his shoulder, and a river rat resting his peavey on the ground. The granite base of the statue is engraved with a memorial that reads "Erected to perpetuate the memory of the pioneer lumbermen of Michigan through whose labors was made possible the development of the prairie states." It is also inscribed with the names of the logging families who dedicated their time and efforts to the industry in the area. It was built in 1931, dedicated in 1932 and is managed by the USDA Forest Service. The monument is located along the River Road Scenic Byway, a 22-mile (35 km) drive between Oscoda and South Branch that runs parallel with the Au Sable River.

== The area ==
The monument is located within the eastern part of the Huron-Manistee National Forests area. The nearest settlements are Tawas City and East Tawas 11 miles (18 km) to the south, Au Sable and Oscoda 15 miles (24 km) to the east and Hale 11 miles (18 km) to the southwest. In the late 19th century, the area was heavily logged for timber that was used in building houses and factories. After the logging industry settled down, much of the area was repopulated with trees, which is the forest we see today.

== Park facilities ==
Access to the park is granted year round and free of charge. The visitor center and other facilities are staffed between May and October. Pathways are lined with exhibits with descriptive signs allowing visitors to learn about the history of the logging industry in Michigan. The monument overlooks Cooke Dam Pond and Horseshoe Island on the Au Sable river which was a major logging thoroughfare.

== Logging history ==
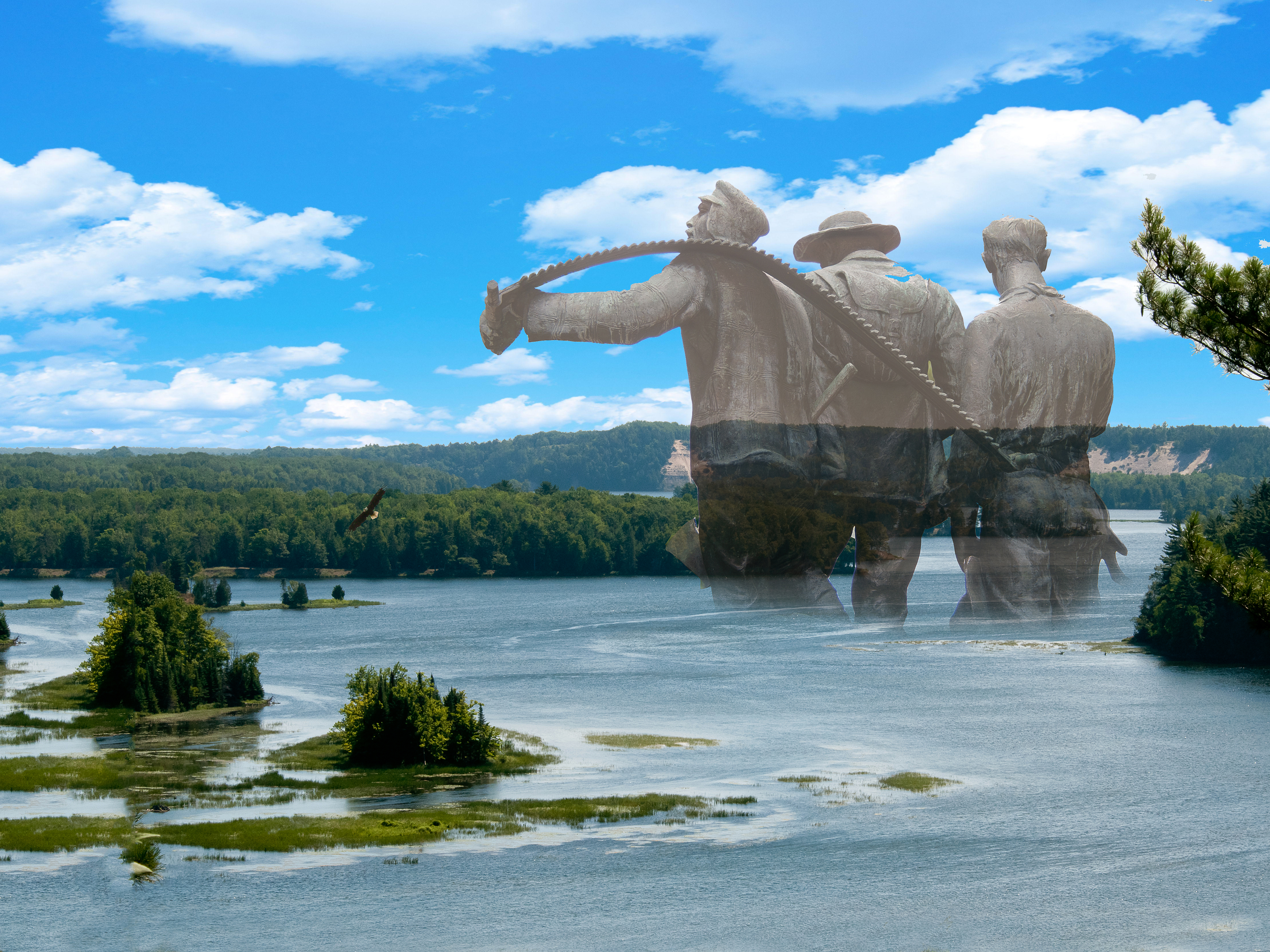
A stylized image of the monument used as the cover of a high school yearbook

The monument is located in a forest that was heavily logged in the second half of the 19th century. The white pine that made up much of the forest was in high demand nationwide for housing, ships, and other manufacturing. In particular, much of the housing in the Midwest was built using lumber taken from Michigan forests. Once people began realizing how immense the forests of Michigan were, popularity of lumbering and its profitability increased. Timber cruisers, who worked for lumbermen, would survey the woods and reserve the best plots for their bosses in the land office. During this time, land could be bought for as little as $1.25 an acre. In the winter, Sawyers cut down the trees and swampers trimmed them. The logs were then loaded onto sleds and pulled to the nearest riverbank by horses or oxen, over paths in the ice, and dumped down stream towards the sawmill. Loggers downstream had to deal with log jams on a regular basis. Once the logs finally reached the sawmill, they were cut into boards for use in manufacturing buildings like houses and factories.

The many rivers and lakes within Michigan as well as its huge stretches of pines and hardwoods gave it a great advantage in the lumber business. Not only was there plenty of timber to be farmed, there were also ample waterways to transport the logs. In 1867, mill property on streams that connected with Lake Michigan on the western side of the state had a total value of approximately two million dollars; property on the eastern side was valued over five million dollars. The total number of sawmills in Michigan was approximated to be 665.

The lumber industry in Michigan boomed following the Civil War as the economy generally rebounded and urban areas in the north, particularly Detroit and Chicago, entered phases of dramatic expansion. Production reached peak levels from the 1870s to the 1890s.

The logging industry led to the development of many towns including Grayling, Manistee, Muskegon and Alpena. In the later decades of the 19th century, the historical old growth forests in Michigan began to be exhausted, duplicating trends seen in eastern states in earlier decades. Thousands of acres were left largely as clear-cut scrubland. Although there was increasing awareness of the importance of replanting, the time needed to grow mature trees made this problematic. The decline of the lumbering industry also led to many forgotten ghost towns such as Alcona and Killmaster—now Gustin Township, Michigan, and the 25 ghost towns in Benzie County.

The Lumbermen Monument sculpture is a work of Robert Aitken. "On one corner you may notice the words ‘Aitken Fecit’, meaning Aitken made it. Fecit coming from a Latin verb meaning ‘to make’."

== Gallery ==
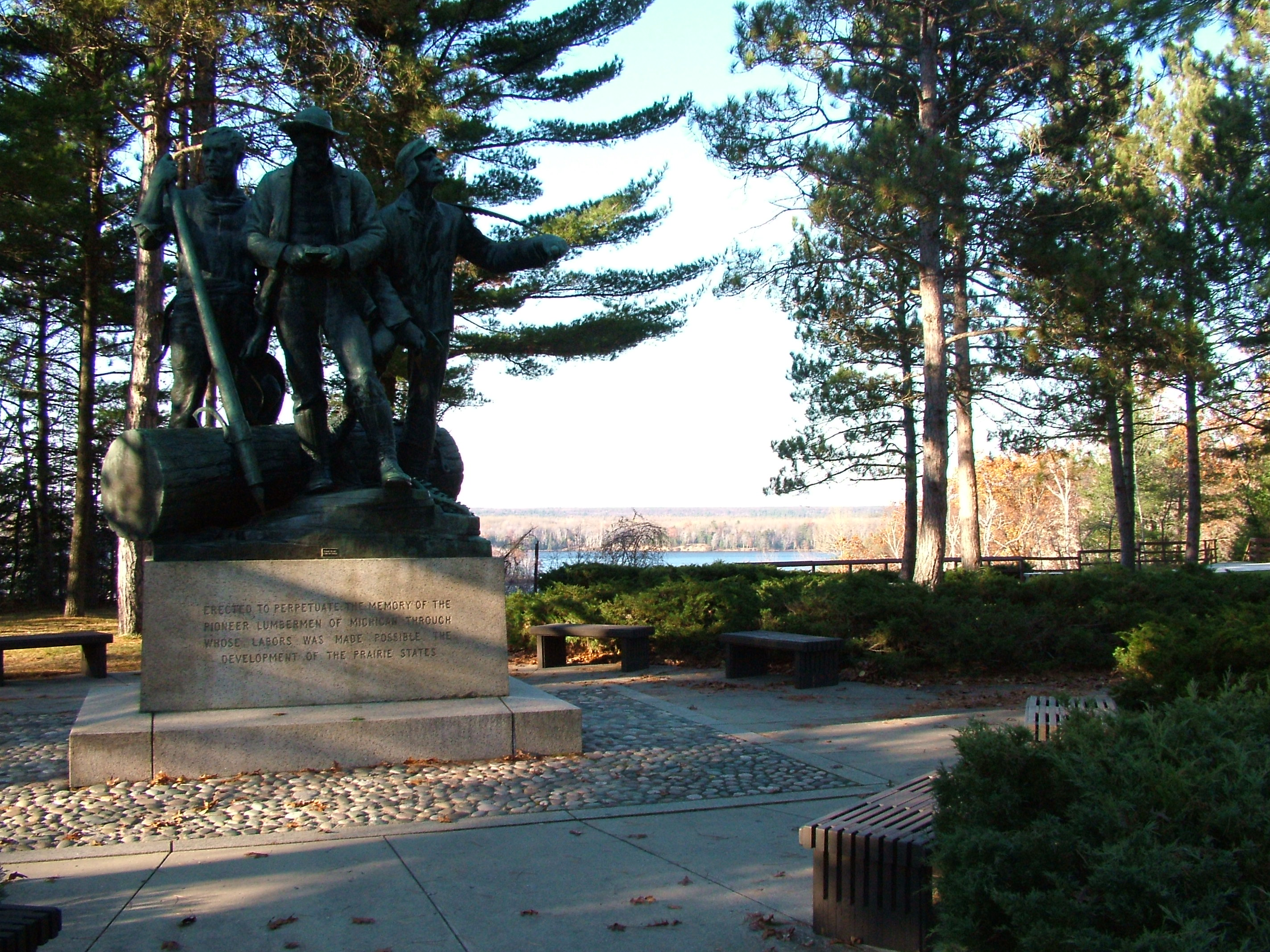
A wide view of the area with Au Sable River and Cooke Dam Pond in background

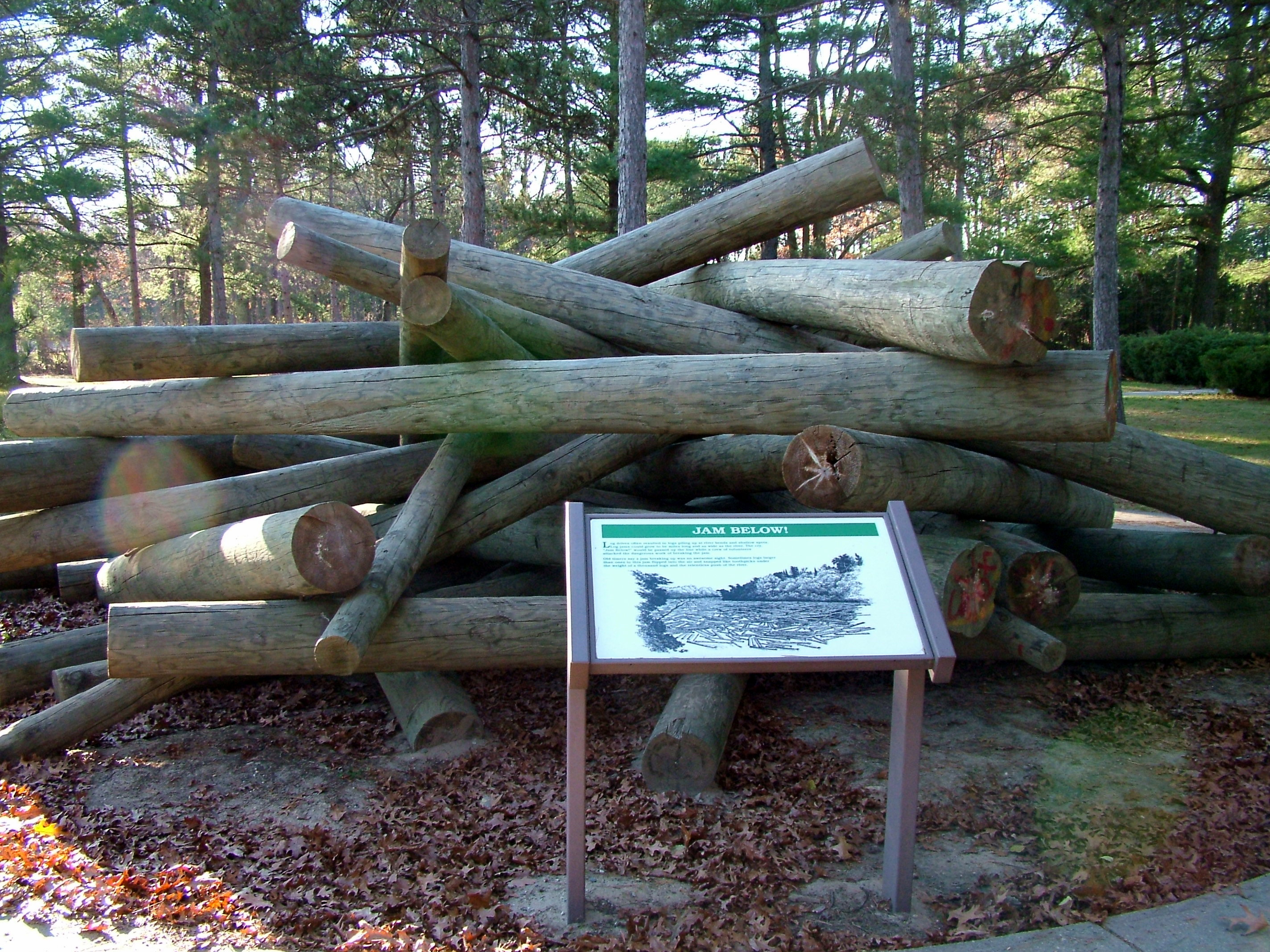
An outdoor exhibit of what a log jam on the river might look like

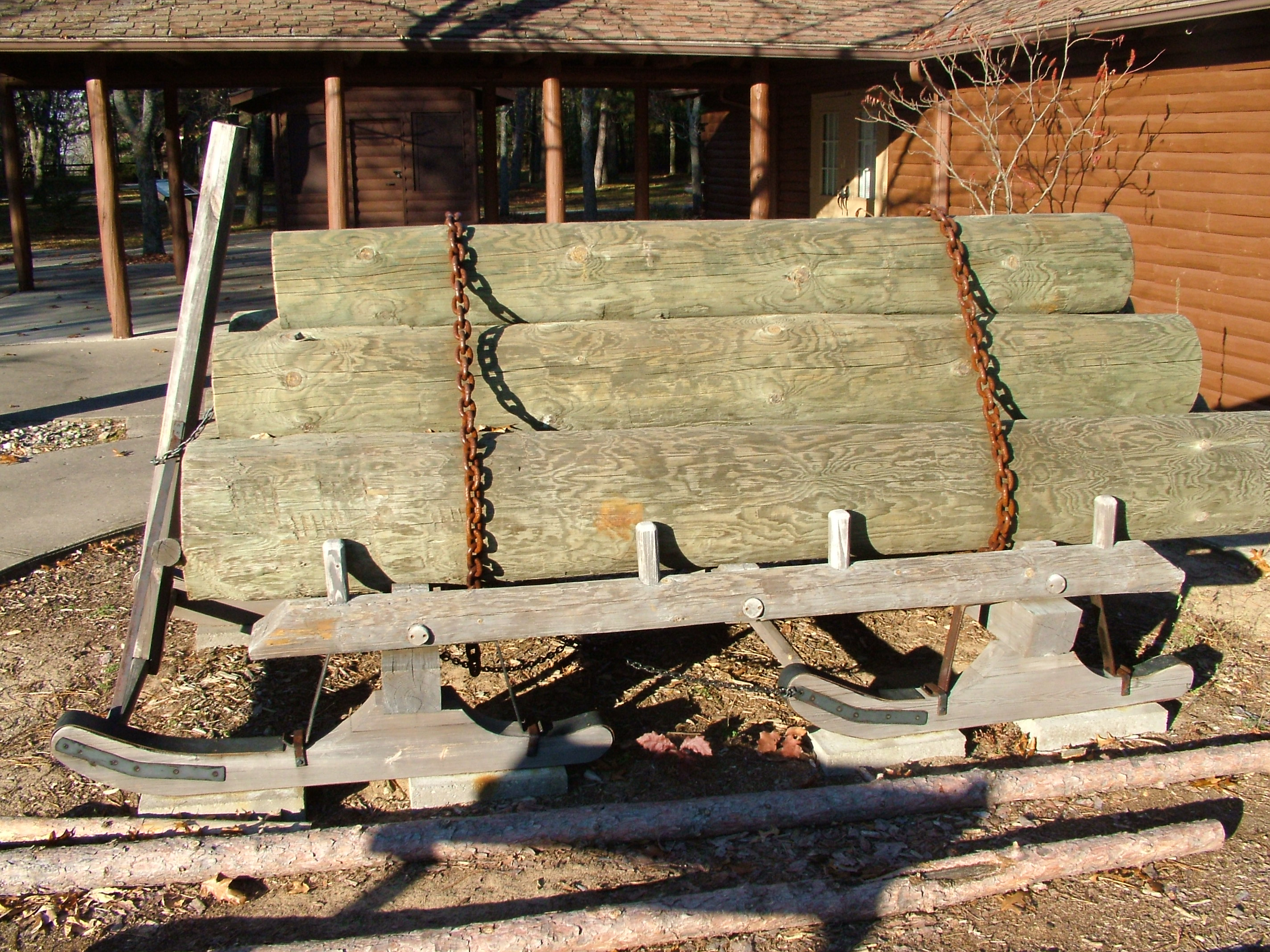
A typical sled used to transport logs to the riverbank

== See also ==
- Hartwick Pines State Park and Interlochen State Park, the two remaining stands of virgin Eastern White Pine in the Lower Peninsula.
