= West Michigan =

Region of Michigan, United States

- A broad definition of West Michigan.
- Country: United States
- State: Michigan
- Largest city: Grand Rapids
- Other cities: List: In Region: Kalamazoo; Muskegon; Holland; Battle Creek; Benton Harbor; Grand Haven

Map of the region, employing a narrow definition.

West Michigan and Western Michigan are terms for a region in the U.S. state of Michigan's Lower Peninsula. Generally, it refers to the Grand Rapids-Muskegon-Holland area, and more broadly to most of the region along the Lower Peninsula's Lake Michigan shoreline, but there is no official definition.

== Definition ==
In general, "West Michigan" often refers to the area bounded by the cities of Muskegon (in the north), Grand Rapids (in the northeast), Kalamazoo–Battle Creek (in the southeast) and St. Joseph–Benton Harbor (in the southwest). However, definitions of the boundaries of the region vary widely; in some contexts, the term "West Michigan" is applied only to the counties of Allegan, Kent, Muskegon, and Ottawa, which form the core of the Grand Rapids-Kentwood-Muskegon CSA. Other definitions include the Kalamazoo–Battle Creek and Benton Harbor–St. Joseph regions, which can be considered distinct regions or parts of other regions such as Michiana, Southern Michigan, or Southwest Michigan, the latter according to one definition comprising Berrien County, Cass County, and Van Buren County.

The northern boundary of the region is also poorly defined; the population density, land use, economic and cultural character, and physical geography most often associated with West Michigan fades in northern Muskegon and Kent Counties, however areas as far north as Ludington and White Cloud may be included because of their close economic ties to the cities to the south. Other areas, such as Montcalm County in the northeast corner of the region, are transitional areas that straddle Michigan regions but are sometimes included for classification purposes. Greenville, in Montcalm County's southwest corner, is closely tied economically with Grand Rapids; however, the northeastern corner, around Vestaburg and Edmore, has historically more closely associated with the cities of Mount Pleasant and Alma, which are almost universally reckoned as part of Central Michigan.

== Geography ==
See also List of Michigan state parks and Geography of Michigan.

- Counties in the area are part of the Roman Catholic Diocese of Grand Rapids or the Roman Catholic Diocese of Kalamazoo.
- In northwest Kent County is Fruit Ridge, which is a prime fruit-growing region; that accounts for 65% of all Michigan apple production.

== Municipalities ==
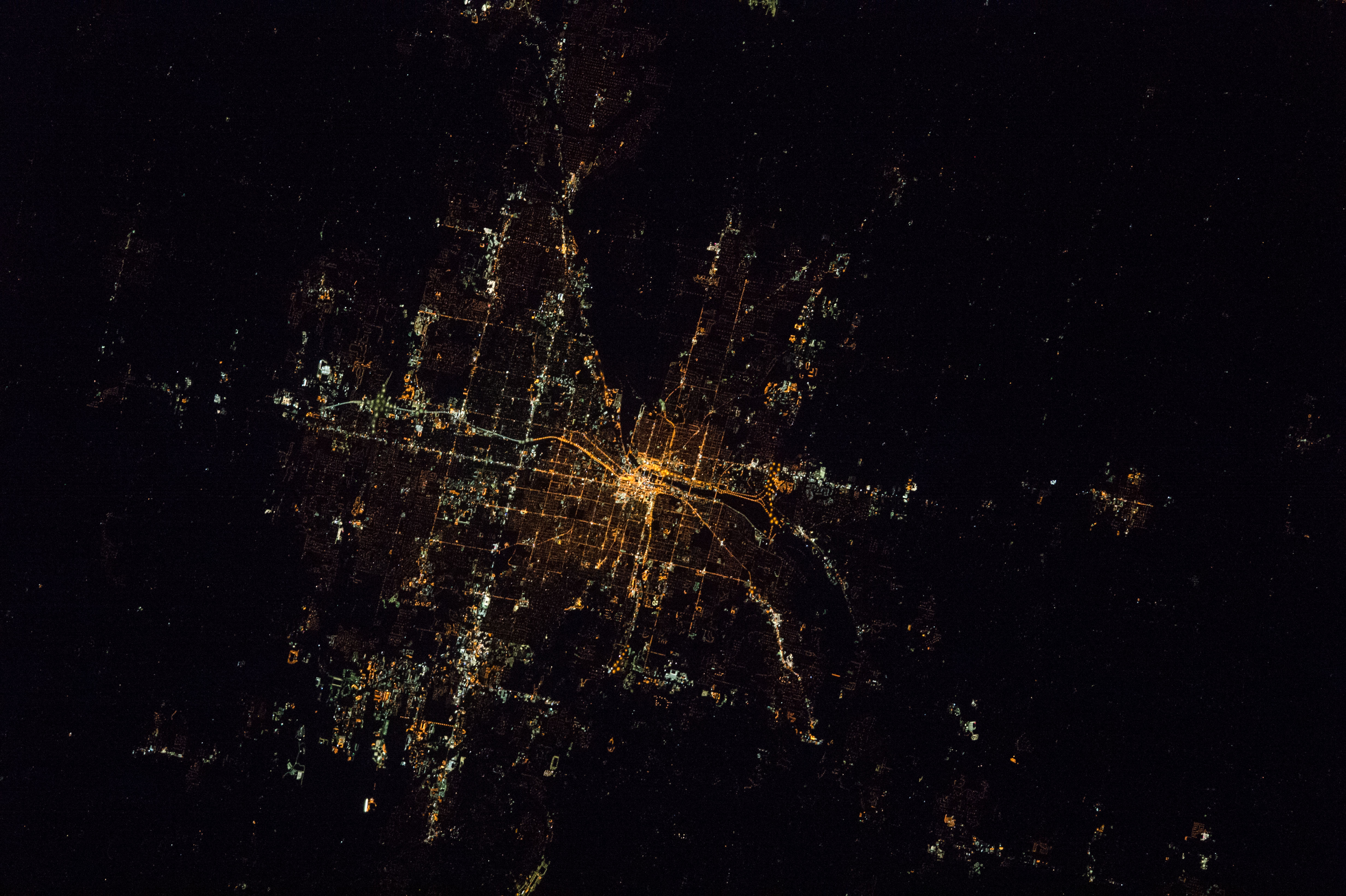
Grand Rapids at night in 2016 from the International Space Station. Grand Rapids is the largest city in western Michigan.

The following table contains the largest municipalities of West Michigan according to the 2010 Census. This defines the region fairly broadly, but not at its most broadly; if Battle Creek were included, it would be ranked fourth.

Rank	Municipality	County	Population
1	Grand Rapids	Kent	198,917
2	Wyoming	Kent	76,501
3	Kalamazoo	Kalamazoo	73,598
4	Kentwood	Kent	54,304
5	Georgetown Charter Township	Ottawa	54,091
6	Portage	Kalamazoo	48,891
7	Muskegon	Muskegon	38,318
8	Holland Charter Township	Ottawa	38,276
9	Holland	Ottawa/Allegan	34,378
10	Plainfield Charter Township	Kent	33,535
11	Gaines Charter Township	Kent	28,812
12	Walker	Kent	25,132
13	Norton Shores	Muskegon	25,030
14	Kalamazoo Charter Township	Kalamazoo	21,918
15	Oshtemo Charter Township	Kalamazoo	21,705
16	Allendale Charter Township	Ottawa	20,708
17	Byron Township	Kent	20,317
18	Muskegon Charter Township	Muskegon	17,840
19	Park Township	Ottawa	17,802
20	Cascade Charter Township	Kent	17,134
21	Grand Rapids Charter Township	Kent	16,661
22	Grandville	Kent	15,378
23	Grand Haven Charter Township	Ottawa	15,178

Five of the above cities, Wyoming, Kentwood, Portage, Norton Shores, and Walker, are former suburban townships that incorporated in the 1960s in order to prevent annexation by an adjacent city. The presence of these cities in the top ten reflects both the large geographic area of these cities, as well as the long and continuing growth of suburban areas in West Michigan.

== Events ==
- ArtPrize in Grand Rapids
- National Baby Food Festival in Fremont
- Big Rapids Riverdays in Big Rapids
- Celebration on the Grand in Grand Rapids (now defunct)
- Coast Guard Festival in Grand Haven
- Electric Forest in Rothbury
- Festival of the Arts in Grand Rapids
- Fruitport Old Fashioned Days in Fruitport
- Spring Lake Heritage Festival in Spring Lake
- Kalamazoo Irish Fest in Kalamazoo
- Michigan Irish Music Festival in Muskegon
- Muskegon Bike Time in Muskegon
- Muskegon Air Show (now defunct)
- Muskegon Film Festival
- Muskegon Summer Celebration (now defunct)
- Rebel Road in Muskegon
- Red Flannel Festival in Cedar Springs
- Rothbury Music Festival in Rothbury
- Tulip Time Festival in Holland
- Unity Christian Music Festival in Muskegon
- Venetian Festival in St. Joseph
- Waterfront Film Festival in Saugatuck

== Attractions ==
- Croton Dam
- Dutch Village
- Frederik Meijer Gardens & Sculpture Park
- Gerald R. Ford Presidential Museum
- Grand Haven Musical Fountain
- Grand Haven State Park
- Grand Rapids Art Museum
- Grand Rapids Children's Museum
- Hardy Dam
- Holland State Park
- John Ball Zoo in Grand Rapids
- Kalamazoo Air Zoo
- Kruizenga Art Museum
- Manistee National Forest
- Michigan's Adventure amusement park
- Newaygo State Park
- P.J. Hoffmaster State Park
- Public Museum of Grand Rapids
- Timber Ridge Ski Area
- Binder Park Zoo

== Universities and colleges ==
- Albion College
- Andrews University
- Aquinas College
- Baker College
- Calvin University
- Cornerstone University
- Davenport University
- Ferris State University
- Grand Rapids Community College
- Grand Valley State University
- Hope College
- Jackson College
- Kalamazoo College
- Kellogg Community College
- Kendall College of Art and Design
- Kuyper College
- Muskegon Community College
- Western Michigan University

== Business ==
Prominent West Michigan corporations include:

- Amway/Alticor/Quixtar, an Ada multi-level marketing company
- Bissell, a Walker vacuum cleaner maker
- Borroughs, a Kalamazoo office equipment manufacturer
- Foremost Insurance, a Farmers Insurance Group company
- Gentex, a Zeeland auto-dimming automobile mirror manufacturer
- Gerber Products Company, a Fremont baby food manufacturer
- Gordon Food Service, a Wyoming food supplier
- Herman Miller, a Zeeland office equipment manufacturer
- Haworth, a Holland office equipment manufacturer
- Howard Miller a Zeeland manufacturer of longcase clocks
- Kellogg's, a Battle Creek breakfast cereal producer
- Meijer, a Walker hypermarket chain
- Old Orchard Brands, a Sparta juice producer
- Perrigo, an Allegan pharmaceutical company
- Spartan Stores, a Byron Township grocery chain
- Steelcase, a Grand Rapids office equipment manufacturer
- Stryker, a Kalamazoo surgical equipment manufacturer
- Whirlpool, a Benton Harbor manufacturer of major home appliances
- Wolverine World Wide/Hush Puppies, a Rockford shoe maker
- X-Rite, a Grand Rapids manufacturer of color matching products
- Mary Free Bed Rehabilitation Hospital, in Grand Rapids

== Transportation ==
=== Major airports ===
- Gerald R. Ford International Airport
- Kalamazoo/Battle Creek International Airport
- Muskegon County Airport

=== Railways ===
- Coopersville and Marne Railway
- CSX
- Grand Trunk Western Railway, subsidiary of Canadian National Railway.
- Grand Elk Railroad
- Grand Rapids Eastern Railroad
- Michigan Shore Railroad
- Michigan Southern Railroad
- Norfolk Southern Railway
- West Michigan Railroad

Amtrak operates its Pere Marquette service in West Michigan, with daily service between Grand Rapids and Chicago. The Wolverine and Blue Water also serve West Michigan and connect the region with East Michigan and Chicago.

=== Major roads ===
==== Interstate highways ====
- I-96, running from Muskegon to Detroit
- I-196, splitting from I-96 in Grand Rapids and going west-southwest and merging with US 31 near Holland before intersecting I-94 near Benton Harbor
- I-94, running from Billings, Montana, to Port Huron, Michigan

==== US highways ====
- US 12 Michigan Avenue and Chicago Road
- US 31, running from Mackinaw City, Michigan, to Mobile, Alabama
- US 131, running from north of Middlebury, Indiana, to Petoskey, Michigan
- Grand River Avenue, running from Grand Rapids to Detroit
- The S-Curve, a famously crooked stretch of US 131 in downtown Grand Rapids

==== Michigan highways ====
- M-6, also known as the South Beltline, bypasses Grand Rapids connecting to I-96 east of town and I-196 west of town
- M-37, running from the southwest corner of Battle Creek at exit 92 on I-94 to the Mission Point Light on Old Mission Point in Grand Traverse County.
- M-43, a highway in southwestern and central Michigan from South Haven to Webberville
- M-45 (Lake Michigan Drive), running east–west from Grand Rapids through Allendale and ending at Lake Michigan.
- M-46, a cross-peninsular road, running across the entire mitten of the Lower Peninsula including the Thumb, from Port Sanilac on the Lake Huron shore, through Saginaw near Saginaw Bay, and on to Muskegon on the Lake Michigan shore.
- M-40 running North and South from Mottville, Michigan, to Holland, Michigan.

=== Other ===
- Eastern port of the Lake Express High Speed Car Ferry; Muskegon
- The SS Badger in Ludington
- The West Michigan Tourist Association promotes the region from a tourism standpoint

== Notable residents or former residents ==
More comprehensive lists are available at individual cities, villages, etc.

- Justin Abdelkader, former Detroit Red Wings forward
- Gillian Anderson, actress
- Jim Bakker, television evangelist
- Johnny Benson, stock car driver
- Dan Bylsma, NHL hockey coach
- Roger B. Chaffee, NASA astronaut
- Kirk Cousins, quarterback for the Minnesota Vikings
- Terry Crews, actor
- Betsy DeVos, U.S. Secretary of Education
- Debarge, music group
- Thomas White Ferry, U.S. Senator
- Nancy Anne Fleming, Miss America 1961
- Gerald R. Ford, President of the United States
- James Frey, writer
- Frank Daniel Gerber, founder of the Gerber Products Company
- Al Green, R&B/Gospel artist
- Mark Grimmette, Olympics luger
- Ernie Hudson, actor
- Iggy Pop, punk rock icon
- Tom Izzo, Michigan State Spartans Basketball coach
- Derek Jeter, New York Yankees shortstop
- Greg Jennings, Green Bay Packers wide receiver
- Maynard James Keenan, Tool and A Perfect Circle vocalist
- W.K. Kellogg, Kellogg Company founder
- Stanley Ketchel, Middleweight Champion boxer
- Anthony Kiedis, Red Hot Chili Peppers vocalist
- Taylor Lautner, actor
- Buster Mathis, heavyweight boxer
- Floyd Mayweather, professional boxer
- Nate McLouth, professional baseball player
- Harry Morgan, actor
- Jason Newsted, musician, Metallica
- Mustard Plug, ska band
- Pop Evil, hard rock band
- Andy Richter, television entertainer
- Del Shannon, musician
- Sinbad, actor and comedian
- Wayne Static, Static-X lead singer/guitarist
- Bill Szymczyk, music producer for the Eagles, The Who, and others
- Sojourner Truth, abolitionist
- Vonda Kay Van Dyke, Miss America 1965
- Brian Vander Ark, Verve Pipe frontman
- Dick York, actor

== See also ==
- List of counties in Michigan
- Michiana
- Southern Michigan
- Michigan
