= Dan E. Karn Generating Plant =

Power plant in Essexville, Michigan, United States

Dan E. Karn Power Plant
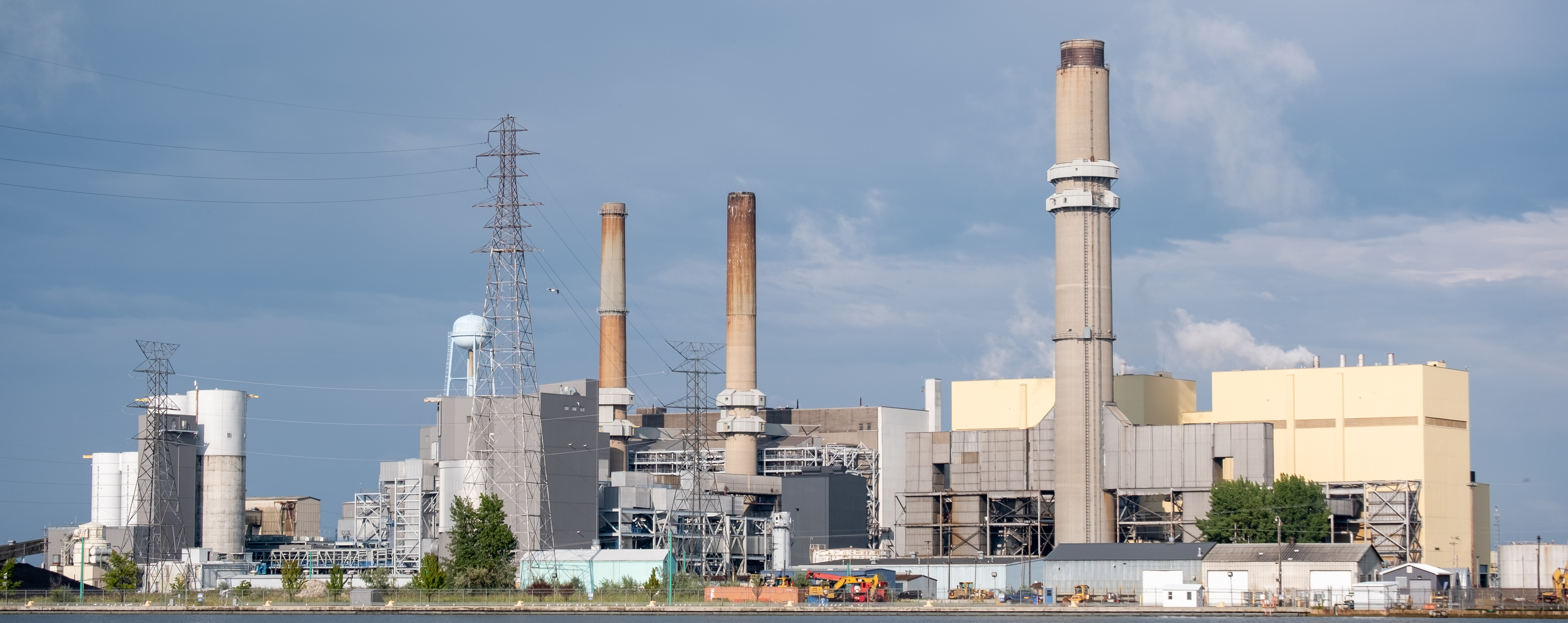
- View from across the Saginaw River of the Dan E. Karn Power Plant (2020)
- Country: United States
- Location: Essexville, Michigan
- Coordinates: 43.6445672°N 83.8400709°W
- Status: Being decommissioned
- Commission date: November 1959
- Owner: Consumers Energy

Thermal power station
- Primary fuel: Natural gas
- Tertiary fuel: Coal

Power generation
- Units operational: 4
- Nameplate capacity: 1,946.3 MW

External links
- Commons: Related media on Commons

The Dan E. Karn Power Plant is a multi-fuel power station located in Essexville, Michigan. It is adjacent to the location of the former J.C. Weadock Power Plant Power Plant, which closed in 2016.

The primary fuels for the Karn facility are coal and natural gas. The facility's owner, Consumers Energy, closed the coal-fired units in June 2023.

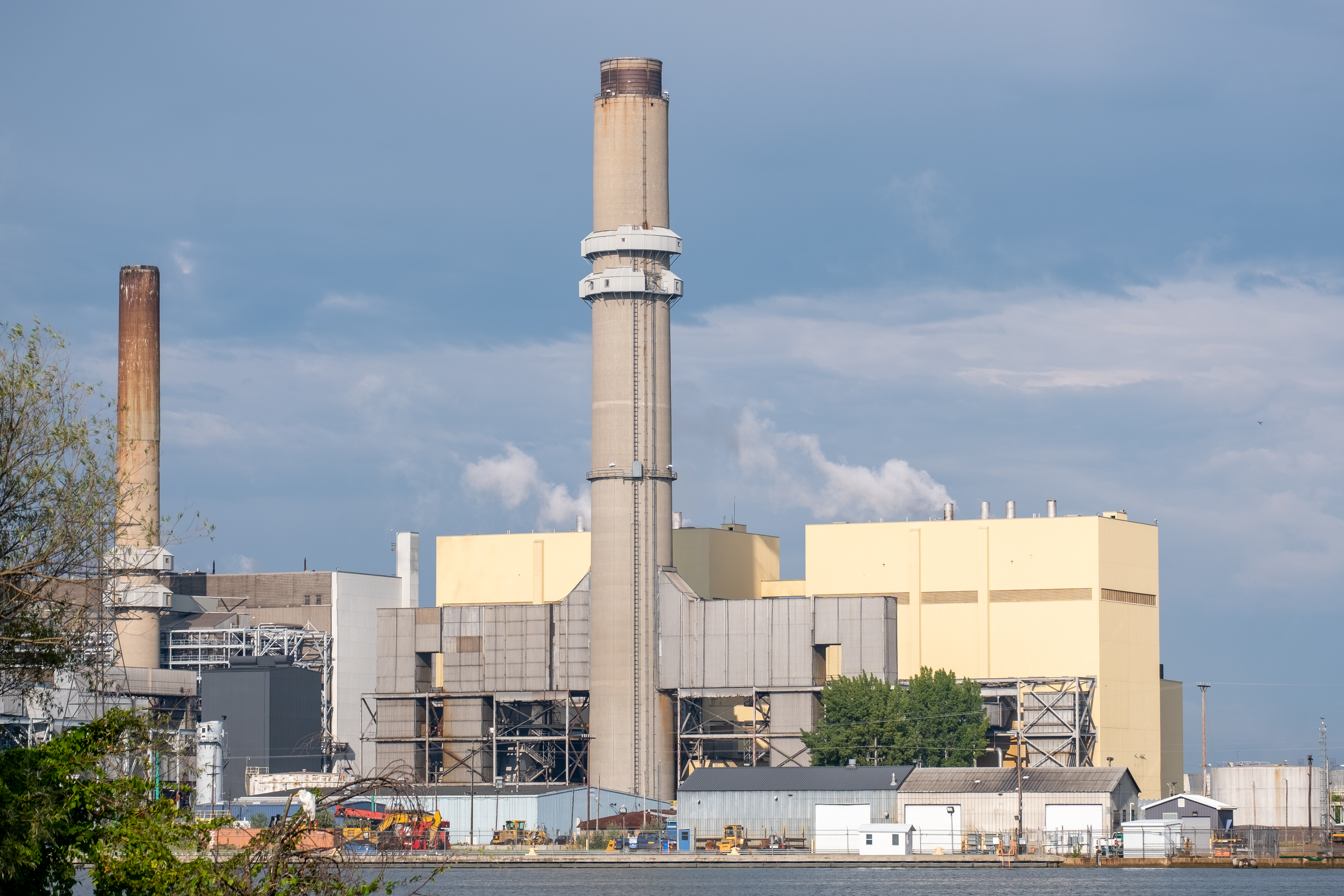
View of the Dan E. Karn Power Plant from across the Saginaw River (August 2020)

== History ==
Unit 1, a coal-fired system, was opened in November 1959, and dedicated in June 1960. Combined with the adjacent J.C. Weadock Power Plant Power Plant, it was known as the Karn/Weadock Generating Complex. The combined complex occupied 2,400 acres of land.

Unit 2, another coal-fired system, was opened in March 1961.

Unit 3, a gas-fired system, was opened in January 1975 followed by another gas-fired system, unit 4, in September 1977.

In 1960, it was one of four plants providing approximately 95% of Consumer Energy's electricity.

The complex acquired an American Locomotive Company RS-1 locomotive in 1968, which it later donated to the Saginaw Railway Museum. The train was used to transport coal to the coal-fired units 1 and 2.

From 1990 to 1997, an onsite walleye rearing pond raised approximately 5,000 fingerlings which were released in the nearby Saginaw Bay.

From 1991 until 2010 the complex was certified by the Wildlife Habitat Council for stewardship of its land.

In 2004, the nitrogen oxide emissions at units 1 and 2 were reduced by 83% by installing selective catalytic reduction (SCR) equipment. The first SCR equipment was installed on unit 2 in 2003, followed by unit 1 in 2004. The total cost for both installations was approximately US$120,000,000 (equivalent to $204,545,455 in 2025).

From 2006 until 2010 the complex received the Clean Corporate Citizen designation from the then Michigan Department of Environmental Quality (now the Michigan Department of Environment, Great Lakes, and Energy). It also received from the department membership in the Michigan Business Pollution Prevention Partnership from 2006 to 2012.

In 2007, Consumers Energy announced a $2.3 billion plan to build a coal-fired plant at the complex. The plan was formally cancelled in 2010.

In 2008, the United States Fish and Wildlife Service installed a bald eagle nesting platform on the north side of the facility near Windy Point at the mouth of the Saginaw River.

A replacement of the complex's seawall and freighter dock was completed in 2009.

The neighboring power plant, J.C. Weadock power plant, was taken offline in April 2016.

Consumers Energy announced in March 2022 that under an agreement with the Michigan Attorney General, they would close the two coal-fired units, units 1 and 2, in 2023. This will leave units 3 and 4 as the only operational units left, both of which utilize natural gas and fuel oil. Those units are scheduled to operate until May 2031.

Units 1 and 2 were closed in June, 2023.

== Namesake ==
Daniel Earl Karn, born April 29, 1890, was president of Consumers Energy (then Consumers Power) from 1951 until his retirement in 1960. He also served on the company's board of directors from 1933 until 1967. He died on June 20, 1969.

== Technology ==
The Karn facility has four units, units 1 and 2 which are coal-fired, and units 3 and 4 which are natural gas-fired.

The coal-fired stations, units 1 and 2, can each generate 272 megawatts (MW) of electricity. Units 3, a gas-fired station, can generate 692.5 MW of electricity. Unit 4, another gas-fired station, can generate 709.8 MW of electricity. As of January 2023, the plant has the capacity to generate 1,946.3 MW of electricity.

When unit 1 was dedicated in 1960, it had 23 switches with high momentary current ratings.

Units 1 and 2 use a tangential firing type for the coal while units 3 and 4 use an opposed wall firing type for the gas.

Unit number	Date opened	Capacity	Technology	Primary fuel type	Notes
1	1959	272 MW	Conventional steam coal	Coal	
2	1961	272 MW	Conventional steam coal	Coal	
3	1975	692.5 MW	Natural gas steam turbine	Natural gas	
4	1977	709.8 MW	Natural gas steam turbine	Natural gas	

== Emissions and environment ==
The Karn plant is operated under permits from the Michigan Department of Environment, Great Lakes, and Energy. According to that department's Michigan Air Emissions Reporting System Annual Pollutant Totals, in 2020 the facility emitted:

- CO (Carbon monoxide) - 285.97 tons (2020)
- SO_{x} (sulfur oxides) - 629.44 tons (2020)
- NO_{x} (nitrogen oxides) - 663.02 (2020)
- PM10 (particulates) - 431.3 tons (2020)

== See also ==
- List of power stations in Michigan
