= John C. Weadock Generating Plant =

Former power plant in Hampton Township, Michigan, United States

John C. Weadock Power Plant
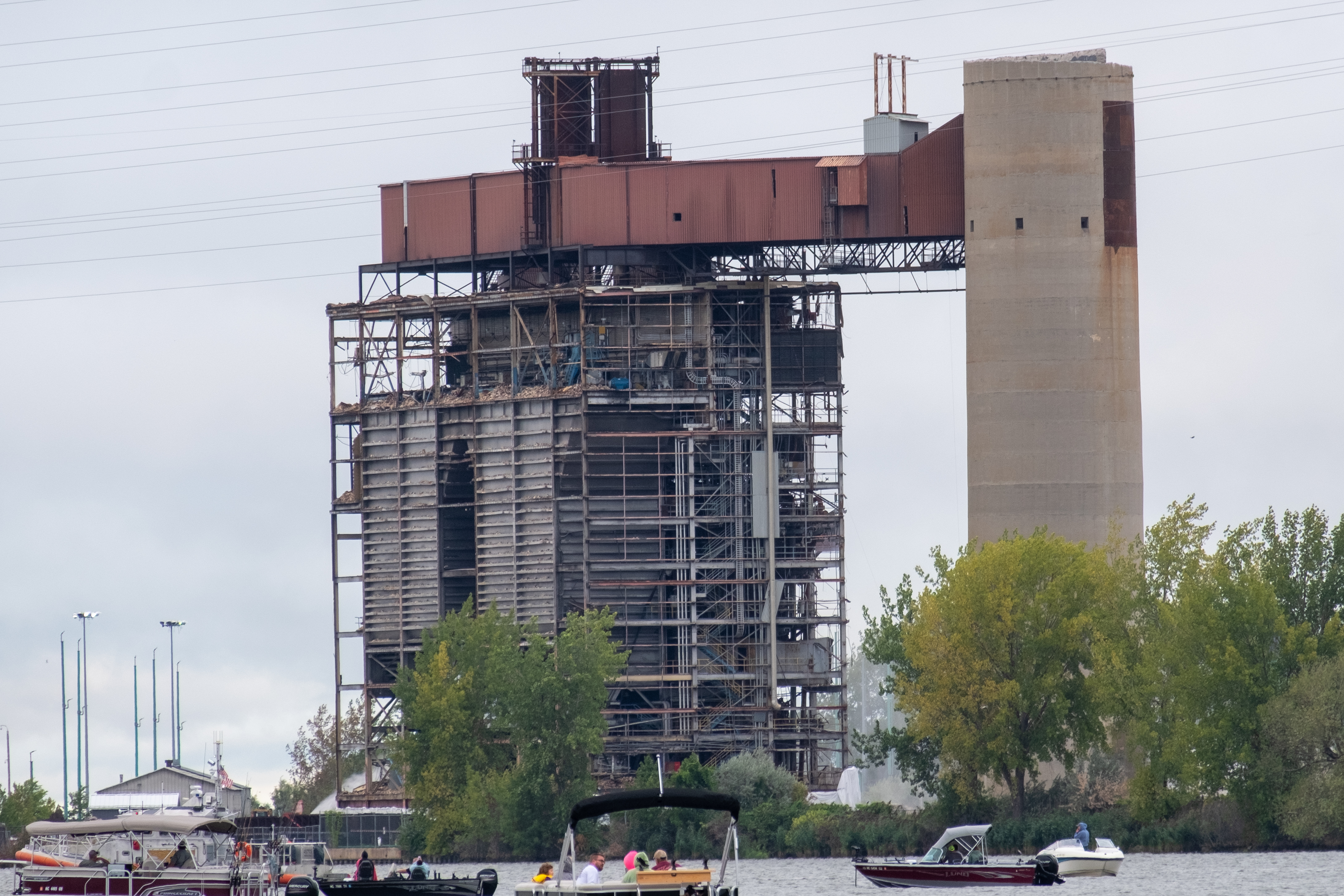
- View from across the Saginaw River of the John C. Weadock Power Plant prior to its demolition (2020)
- Country: United States
- Location: Hampton Township, Michigan
- Coordinates: 43.6401164°N 83.8450000°W
- Status: Decommissioned
- Construction began: 1937
- Commission date: 1940
- Decommission date: April 2016
- Owner: Consumers Energy

Thermal power station
- Primary fuel: Coal

Power generation
- Nameplate capacity: 303 MW

External links
- Commons: Related media on Commons

The John C. Weadock Power Plant was a coal-fired power station located in Hampton Township, Michigan. It was adjacent to the Dan E. Karn Power Plant, which remains operational as of March 2023.

The primary fuel for the Weadock facility was coal.

It was decommissioned in April 2016 and demolished on August 29, 2020.

== History ==
Construction began on the facility in 1937.

The facility began operations in 1940, with a capacity to produce 35 megawatts (MW) of electricity. Unit 1 was eventually joined by 5 similar units.

It was formally dedicated to John C. Weadock on June 22, 1950, at a ceremony attended by approximately 300 people. By the dedication, the facility's capacity had grown to being able to produce 290 MW of electricity. At the time, it was one of fifty power plants operated by Consumers Power (later Consumers Energy).

Unit 7, a coal-fired system, was opened in May 1955. It was followed with the opening of another coal-fired system, unit 8, in January 1958.

Following the opening of the adjacent Dan E. Karn Power Plant in 1959, they became collectively known as the Karn/Weadock Generating Complex. The combined complex occupied 2,400 acres of land.

In 1960, it was one of four plants providing approximately 95% of Consumer Energy's electricity.

The complex acquired an American Locomotive Company RS-1 locomotive in 1968, which it later donated to the Saginaw Railway Museum. The train was used to transport coal around the complex.

In 1980, units 1 through 6 were retired.

From 1990 to 1997, an onsite walleye rearing pond raised approximately 5,000 fingerlings which were released in the nearby Saginaw Bay.

From 1991 until 2010 the complex was certified by the Wildlife Habitat Council for stewardship of its land.

From 2006 until 2010 the complex received the Clean Corporate Citizen designation from the then Michigan Department of Environmental Quality (now the Michigan Department of Environment, Great Lakes, and Energy). It also received from the department membership in the Michigan Business Pollution Prevention Partnership from 2006 to 2012.

In 2007, Consumers Energy announced a $2.3 billion plan to build a coal-fired plant at the complex. The plan was formally cancelled in 2010.

A replacement of the complex's seawall and freighter dock was completed in 2009 for $21 million.

=== Closing ===
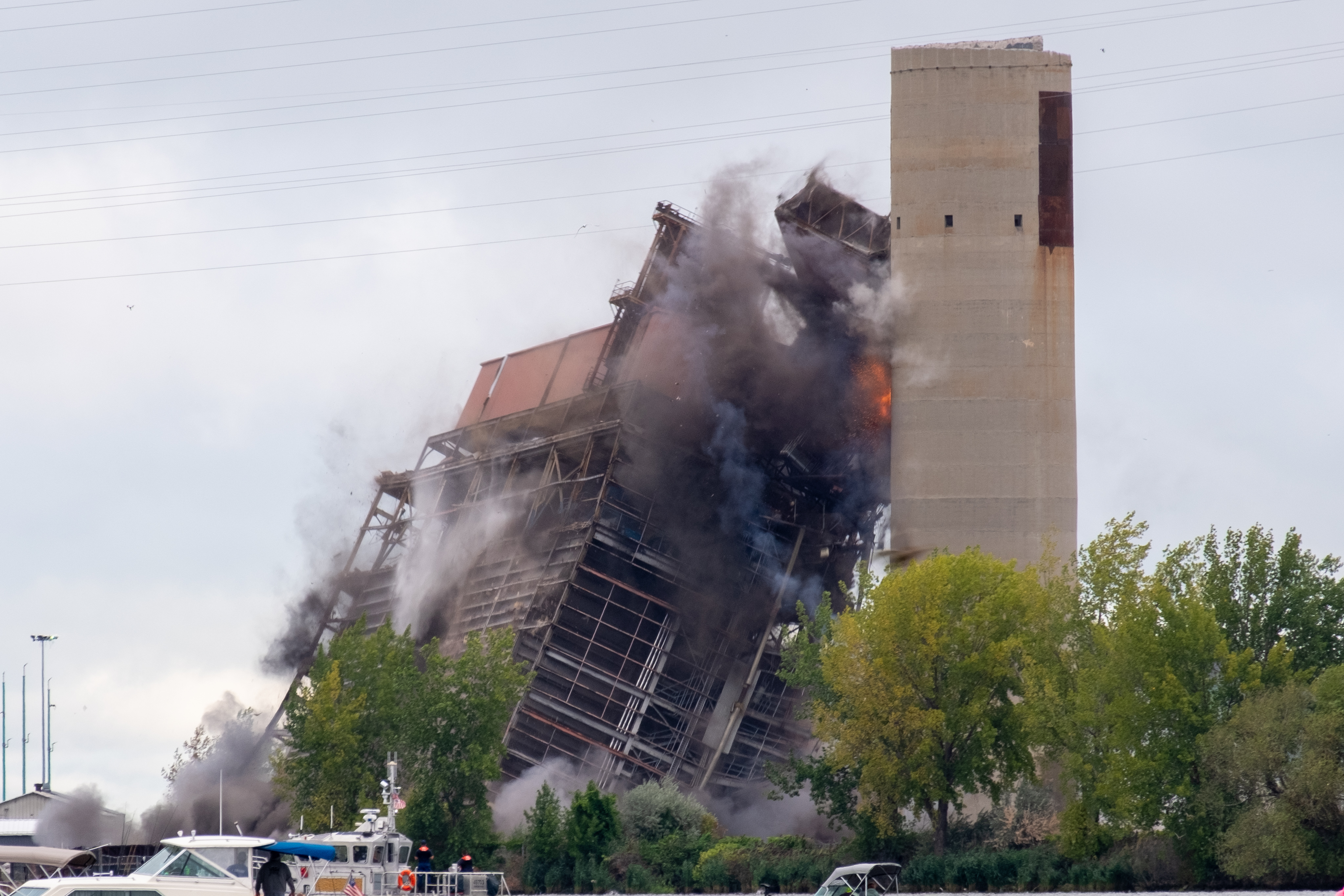
Demolition of final portions of Weadock on August 29, 2020

Slow motion video of demolition of final portions of Weadock on August 29, 2020 (normal speed)

In 2011, Consumers Energy announced plans to close the facility in 2015.

The facility was decommissioned in April 2016.

Demolition work began in 2017. The final portions of the main building were demolished on August 29, 2020.

== Namesake ==
John C. Weadock was a Michigan and New York corporate attorney. He was involved in the formation of Consumers Power Company (now Consumers Energy) in 1910. He died on September 10, 1950 - not long after attending the dedication of the facility in his honor on June 22, 1950.

== Technology ==
The Weadock facility had two coal-fired units, units 1 and 2, which used a tangential firing type.

Unit 7 had the capacity to generate 152 megawatts (MW) of electricity, while unit 8 was able to generate 151 MW. In December 2015, the plant had the capacity to generate 303 MW of electricity.

Unit number	Date opened	Capacity	Technology	Primary fuel type	Date closed	Notes
1	1940	35 MW		Coal	1980	
2		255 MW combined		Coal	1980	
3		255 MW combined		Coal	1980	
4		255 MW combined		Coal	1980	
5		255 MW combined		Coal	1980	
6		255 MW combined		Coal	1980	
7	1955	152 MW	Conventional steam coal	Coal	April 2016	
8	1958	151 MW	Conventional steam coal	Coal	April 2016	

== Emissions and environment ==
The Weadock plant was operated under permits from the then Michigan Department of Environmental Quality (now the Michigan Department of Environment, Great Lakes, and Energy). According to that department's Michigan Air Emissions Reporting System Annual Pollutant Totals, in 2008 the facility emitted:

- CO_{2} (Carbon dioxide) - 543.55 tons (2008)
- SO_{x} (sulfur oxides) - 18,824.12 tons (2008)
- NO_{x} (nitrogen oxides) - 5,460.12 (2008)
- PM10 (particulates) - 648.49 tons (2008)

The facility burned approximately 1 million tons of coal each year.

== See also ==
- List of power stations in Michigan
