= Newaygo (disambiguation) =

Newaygo may refer to:

- Newaygo, Michigan
- Newaygo County, Michigan
- Newaygo State Park, Michigan
- Newaygo (ship)
