= Newaygo State Park =

Park in Michigan, United States

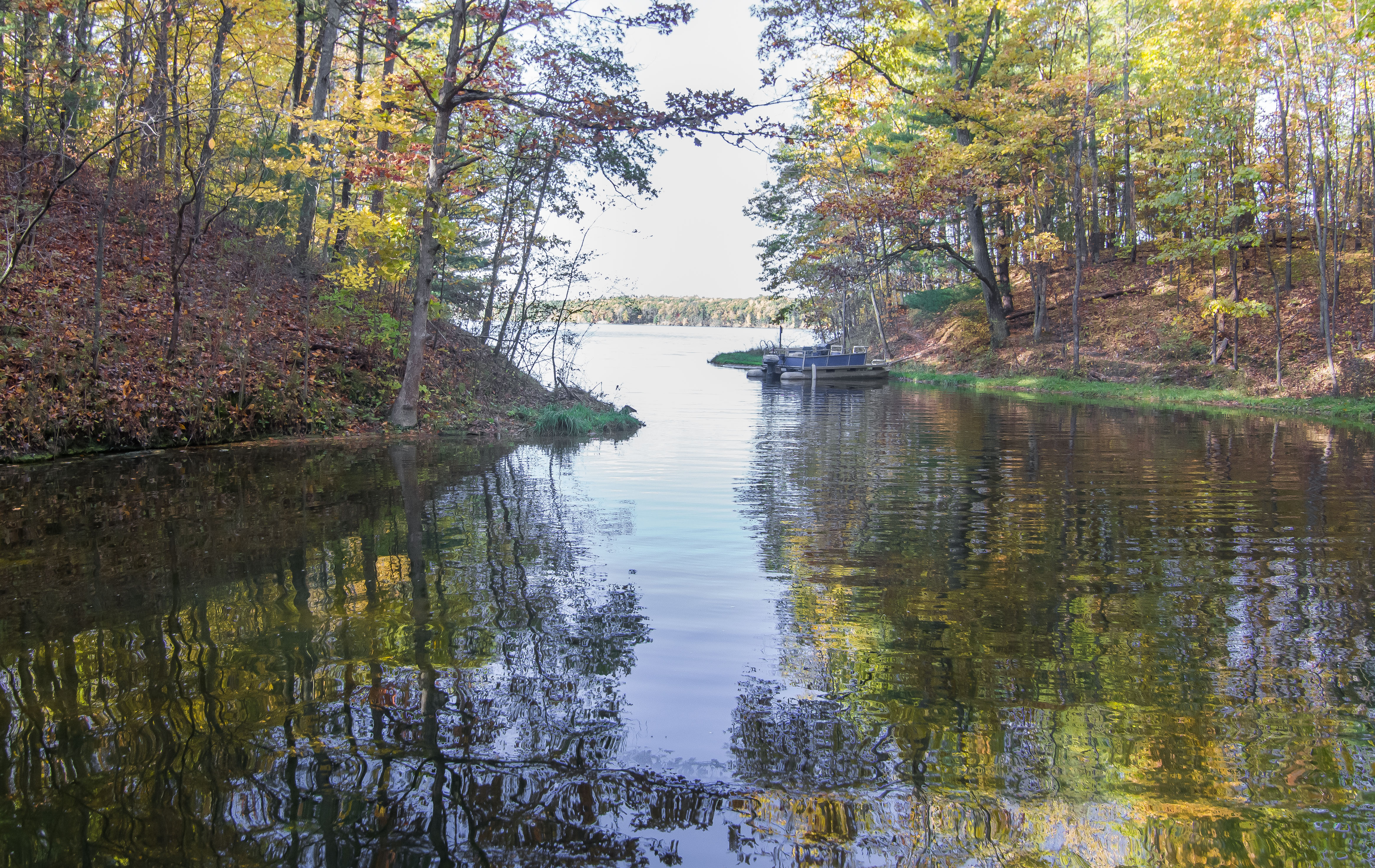
- Boat launch area

- Location within Michigan Location within the United States
- Location: Big Prairie Township, Newaygo County, Michigan, United States
- Nearest city: Newaygo, Michigan
- Coordinates: 43°30′09″N 85°35′30″W
- Area: 400 acres (160 ha)
- Elevation: 850 feet (260 m)
- Established: 1966
- Administrator: Michigan Department of Natural Resources
- Designation: Michigan state park
- Website: Official website

Newaygo State Park is a public recreation area covering 400 acres (160 ha) on the south side of Hardy Dam Pond in Big Prairie Township, Newaygo County, Michigan. The state park sits atop 20-foot (6.1 m) embankments overlooking the six-mile-long (10 km), 4,000-acre (1,600 ha) impoundment of the Muskegon River.

== History ==
The park was created in 1966 when the state leased acreage that included 4,500 feet (1,400 m) of water frontage from Consumers Power Company.

== Activities and amenities ==
The park offers swimming, fishing for bass, walleye and panfish, boat launch, picnicking, playground, and 99 rustic campsites.
