= Dump charging =

Battery charging method

Dump charging, also known as dumb charging, is a method of charging an electric vehicle's battery pack where charging begins immediately upon being connected to the electrical grid, without considering electricity supply-demand imbalances or real-time market prices. This is in contrast to smart charging.

Dump charging can achieve a higher rate of charging than is possible with standard grid connections and battery chargers, making use of high capacity grid connections, such as those found at businesses and industrial buildings with high electrical demand, may be used. With dump charging, there is no power regulation or control, which may have disruptive effects on the distribution network, such as large voltage drops and congestion. With the increasing uptake of electric cars, limiting uncontrolled (dump) charging may become necessary to prevent stress on electrical grids, especially during periods of high demand. Dump charging may also use a large stationary or mobile battery pack which can be used to transfer energy at a high rate to the vehicle's battery. A charger or a wire can be used to regulate the power flow from a higher voltage battery into the lower voltage vehicle battery.

Dump charging was a precursor used by BEV drag racers at the race track in the 1990s to rapidly refuel a car between quarter mile runs. It could be considered an early version of direct current fast charge (DCFC) such as CHAdeMO, CCS, or Tesla Supercharger used to refuel a BEV's battery as rapidly as possible, limited only by the battery chemistry and thermal management systems. This method is commonly used during road trips in production BEVs to refuel in under a half an hour for a few hundred miles of additional range. Modern DCFC installations often leverage a large capacity stationary battery to reduce high cost demand charges from grid connections.

== See also ==
- Charging station
