= Consumers Energy =

American public utility

- Type: Subsidiary
- Industry: Electric utilities, Natural Gas Utilities
- Founded: 1886; 140 years ago
- Headquarters: Jackson, Michigan, United States
- Area served: Michigan
- Parent: CMS Energy
- Website: ConsumersEnergy.com

Consumers Energy is an investor owned utility that provides natural gas and electricity to 6.7 million of Michigan's 10 million residents. It serves customers in all 68 of the state's Lower Peninsula counties. It is the primary subsidiary of CMS Energy. The company was founded in 1886 and is currently headquartered in Jackson, Michigan.

== History ==
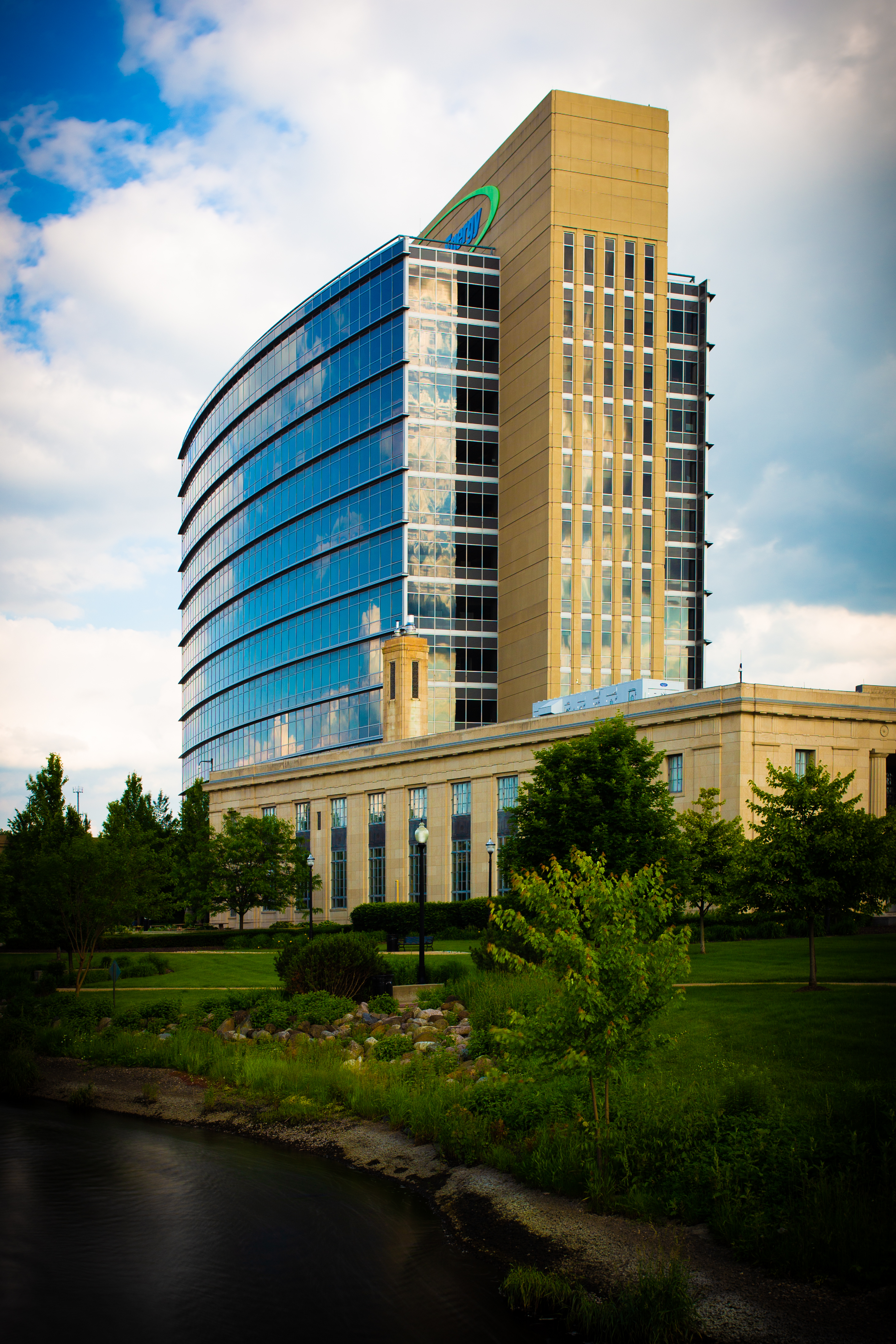
One Energy Plaza, Jackson, Michigan

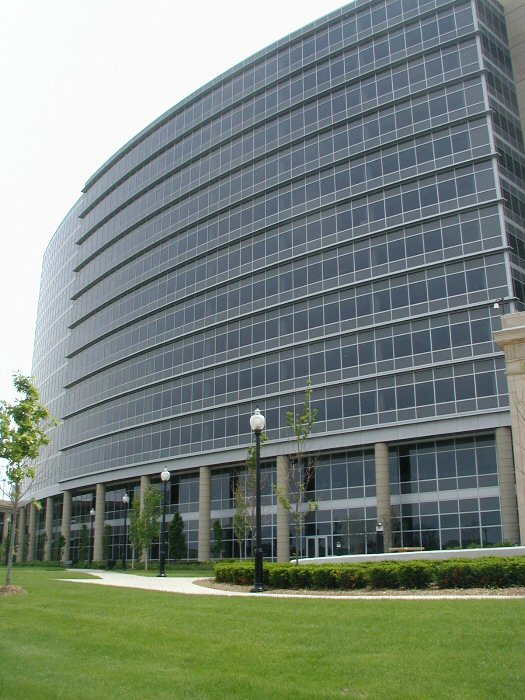
CMS Energy headquarters in downtown Jackson

The company was founded in 1886 as Jackson Electric Light Works by William A. Foote, Samuel Jarvis, of Lansing, and his brother James B. Foote, who was originally tasked to install electric lighting in downtown Jackson. After a series of acquisitions and mergers involving other local electric, gas, and trolley companies which were properties of W.A. Foote, as well as Anton G. Hodenpyl and Henry. D. Walbridge, the company incorporated as Consumers Power Company in 1910 in Maine. It became part of the utility holding conglomerate Commonwealth & Southern Corporation, which held utilities in 10 other states. His wife later founded Foote Hospital, now Henry Ford Allegiance Health, also in Jackson, Michigan.

Commonwealth and Southern dissolved in 1946, leaving Consumers Power (and all other utility holdings) an independent company. After serving Michigan for more than 80 years, the company reincorporated in Michigan in 1968 and maintained its headquarters in Jackson, Michigan. Consumers operated the Big Rock Point Nuclear Power Plant in Charlevoix from 1962 to 1997 and built the Palisades Nuclear Plant near South Haven in 1971, which was sold to Entergy.

In 1968, Consumers Power began construction of a nuclear power plant in Midland, Michigan, primarily for the Dow Chemical Company. However, construction issues caused delays and increased costs. The Three Mile Island accident in 1979 resulted in a massive change in nuclear regulatory requirements and system redesign. When it was revealed the containment buildings were settling and foundation cracks were discovered, Dow cancelled its contract with Consumers Power, and the project was abandoned in 1984. The $4.1 billion investment nearly bankrupted Consumers Power. However, in 1985, Consumers Power formed a partnership with eight other companies to convert Midland's abandoned nuclear plant into a natural gas-fired power plant. Transformation of the plant began in 1986 and was completed at a cost of $500 million. The Midland Cogeneration Venture began producing power in 1991 and that success restored faith in Consumers Power.

In 1997, the name of the company was changed to Consumers Energy. In 2011, Consumers Energy received approval to establish a 100-megawatt wind energy facility in Michigan's Mason County called Lake Winds Energy Park. In 2014, the company announced their second wind farm in Tuscola County with a total investment of $250 million, and named it Cross Winds Energy Park. By 2015, Consumers Energy produced ten percent of its electricity from renewable sources.

In 2009, Consumers Energy launched comprehensive electric and natural gas energy efficiency programs that included rebates and incentives for homes and businesses. Consumers Energy's trademark slogan is "Count on Us", and it is the primary subsidiary of CMS Energy.

In 2018, Consumers Energy announced plans to retire all coal-burning plants by 2040 and expects to have 40% renewable power by then. In 2018, Consumers Energy became the title sponsor of the August Monster Energy NASCAR Cup Series race at Michigan International Speedway.

In December 2020, Garrick J. Rochow assumed the role of President & CEO of CMS and Consumers Energy after a 17-year tenure at the company.

== System information ==
Because of utility regulatory changes, Consumers divested its transmission system. It opted instead to sell the system to the Michigan Electric Transmission Company (METC), currently an ITC Holdings company (which also owns Detroit Edison's transmission system under the "ITCTransmission" brand.) Consumers Energy's primary distribution voltages are 2.77/4.8Y, 4.8/8.32Y, 7.2/12.47Y, 7.97/13.8Y and 14.4/24.9Y. Consumers retained its looped 23 kV and 46 kV high-voltage sub-transmission (HVD) systems and its radial 138 kV lines as well.

== Generating portfolio ==
Consumers Energy's utility-owned generation portfolio consists of a hydroelectric system, including part ownership of Ludington Pumped Storage, wind farms, nuclear power plant, and coal-fired plants and natural gas peakers.

=== Hydroelectric ===
Consumers Energy owns 13 hydroelectric facilities or dams along five rivers in Michigan. Built between 1906 and 1935, the hydros have a combined generating capacity of about 130 megawatts, enough to serve about 70,000 people. Near the hydros are campgrounds, boat launches and nature trails that are popular spots for canoeing, fishing and bird watching. The facilities are located on the Au Sable River (Mio Hydro, Alcona Hydro, Loud Hydro, Five Channels Hydro, Cooke Hydro, Foote Hydro), Grand River (Webber Hydro), Kalamazoo River (Allegan Hydro), Manistee River (Hodenpyl Hydro, Tippy Hydro) and Muskegon River (Rogers Hydro, Hardy Hydro, Croton Hydro). Operating since 1907, the Webber Hydro on the Grand River is the company's oldest operating hydroelectric facility. The Croton Hydro on the Muskegon River was listed in the National Register of Historic Places on August 16, 1979.

Following is a complete, sortable list of Consumers Energy's hydroelectric generating facilities:

Plant	River	Power (MW)	Notes
Alcona Dam	Au Sable	8	
Allegan Hydro	Kalamazoo	3	
Cooke Dam	Au Sable	9	
Croton Dam	Muskegon	9	
Five Channels Dam	Au Sable	6	
Foote Dam	Au Sable	9	
Hardy Dam	Muskegon	30	
Hodenpyl Hydro	Manistee	18	
Loud Dam	Au Sable	4	
Mio Dam	Au Sable	5	
Rogers Hydro	Muskegon	7	
Tippy Dam	Manistee	20	
Webber Hydro	Grand	4	

==== Pumped storage ====
Consumers Energy also operates and co-owns (with DTE Energy) the Ludington Pumped Storage Power Plant near Ludington. Built between 1969 and 1973, the plant sits on a 1,000-acre site along the Lake Michigan shoreline. It includes an 842-acre reservoir that can store up to 27 billion gallons of water — the equivalent of 2 million backyard swimming pools.

=== Nuclear ===
Consumers Energy operated the Big Rock Point Nuclear Power Plant near Charlevoix, Michigan. The plant operated for 35 years, until 1997 when it closed. It was Michigan's first nuclear power plant and the United States' fifth nuclear plant, capable of producing 67 megawatts of electricity. Palisades Nuclear Generating Station (five miles south of South Haven) was previously owned by Consumers Energy and was shut down in May 2022.

=== Fossil fuels ===
==== Coal ====
Consumers Energy's largest power plant is the coal-powered J.H. Campbell power plant between Holland and Grand Haven. The other remaining coal-fired plant was the D.E. Karn generating station located on Saginaw Bay near Bay City. In 2024 it closed Karn coal-fired units 1 and 2 leaving only Karn 3 and 4 to continue operating on natural gas and fuel oil. The Cobb power plant in Muskegon; the Whiting power plant on Lake Erie in Luna Pier, just north of the Michigan-Ohio state line and the J.C. Weadock Generating Plant were all coal plants that ceased operating in 2016. Consumers Energy originally planned to close its remaining coal plants by 2040 but the plan was sped up to close all plants by 2025.

==== Natural gas ====
The Midland Cogeneration Venture in Midland was formerly owned by Consumer Power and still supplies power to them. Additional natural gas units are planned to replace the retiring coal plants.

In 2014 Consumers Energy started the process of purchasing the DPC Juniper power plant located in Jackson, MI. The sale was completed in 2016. The plant was renamed to Jackson Generation Station and has the capacity of 540 megawatts.

Recently in June 2023, Consumers Energy completed the purchase of the Covert Generation Station located in Van Buren County. This plant has a 1,176-megawatt capacity.

Consumers Energy also uses natural gas and oil peaking units. These include the Zeeland Generating Station, Karn 3&4 Generating Station, and combustion turbine stations.

== Natural gas distribution and storage ==
Consumers Energy is a natural gas distributor in Michigan. Its annual quantity of 373 billion cubic feet is distributed to its residential and business customers. The company purchases all natural gas that it provides its customers. It serves more than 1.7 million customers through over 27,000 miles (43,000 km) of transmission and distribution pipelines. In 2013, it was fined $1.4 million for its role in two gas explosions that killed three people.

== Electric vehicles ==
In early 2018, General Motors (GM) and Consumers announced that they formed a partnership to develop "smart charging" technology for owners of electric vehicles. Consumers Energy plans to buy or lease over 100 electric vehicles from GM. The two companies will test new electric vehicle charging technology. The technology will let vehicle owners plug in their car to be charged, but it will delay the actual charging until nighttime during off-peak energy hours. Additionally, Consumers will invest $7.5 million "to encourage the development of EV charging stations across Michigan."

== Canoe marathon ==
Since its inception in 1947, Consumers Energy has been a partner of the Au Sable River Canoe Marathon (ARCM), initially assisting with logistics, but becoming title sponsor in 2012. Paddlers must portage around six hydroelectric dams owned by Consumers. CE underwrites technology and live-coverage, helping fund the GPS tracking of each canoe and coordinating Facebook livestreaming. Employees and company volunteers work many jobs along the 120-mile course and host a free pancake breakfast in Oscoda at the completion of the race. They also sponsor the "Da$h For Ca$h" sprint in the week leading up to the race.

A three-part documentary entitled, Au Sable was released in 2024 on YouTube and aired on local public-access TV stations. It was subtitled, "The River. The Race. The Legends." Narrated by George Blaha, voice of the Detroit Pistons and Michigan State Spartans, it was created by Justin Garant and Darren Cleavenger-Grimsley, two CE employees, with the support of Consumers Energy people and resources. On June 15, 2024, the project won an Emmy Award for Outstanding Sports Documentary from the Michigan chapter of the organization.

== Philanthropy ==
Annually, Consumers Energy awards about $10 million to Michigan nonprofit organizations through grants, employee and retiree contributions and, corporate giving. It has helped to raise over $1.8 million towards United Way's Michigan campaign initiatives, created fund-raising campaigns at their facilities and participated in employee-volunteer events. Consumers Energy has also worked on early childhood development and education in Michigan and has also received Wildlife Habitat Council (WHC) compliant certificates for its efforts to promote environmental education.

In 2013, Consumers Energy was given the William Booth Award by The Salvation Army in recognition of its long history of philanthropic activities and leadership for the PeopleCare assistance program. Since the beginning of PeopleCare program, it has contributed $27 million in energy bill credits.

== Political activities ==
Consumers Energy executives are closely connected to corporate advocacy groups and government positions in Michigan. President and CEO Garrick Rochow sits on the board of directors of the American Gas Association and the Edison Electric Institute, as well as other state-level business organizations. Brandon Hofmeister, Senior Vice President of Sustainability and External Affairs, previously served as energy and climate policy advisor to then-governor Jennifer Granholm and currently sits on Governor Gretchen Whitmer’s Council on Climate Solutions. He is also president of Consumers’ charitable arm.

Hofmeister also sits on the board of directors of Citizens for Energizing Michigan's Economy (CEME), a dark money organization that has operated in Michigan since 2013, running ads opposing renewables and supporting utility-friendly politicians. Consumers gave $43.5 million to CEME between 2014 and 2017. In 2018, the Michigan Public Service Commission ordered Consumers to cease donations to CEME for two years due to its activities.

In 2023, 113 of 148 state legislators in Michigan had accepted campaign contributions from Consumers or its employees. Aric Nesbitt, chair of the House Energy Committee from 2013 to 2016, and Joe Bellino, chair of the House Energy Committee from 2019 to 2023, received the two largest direct campaign contributions from Consumers among the legislators.
