= Rogers Dam =

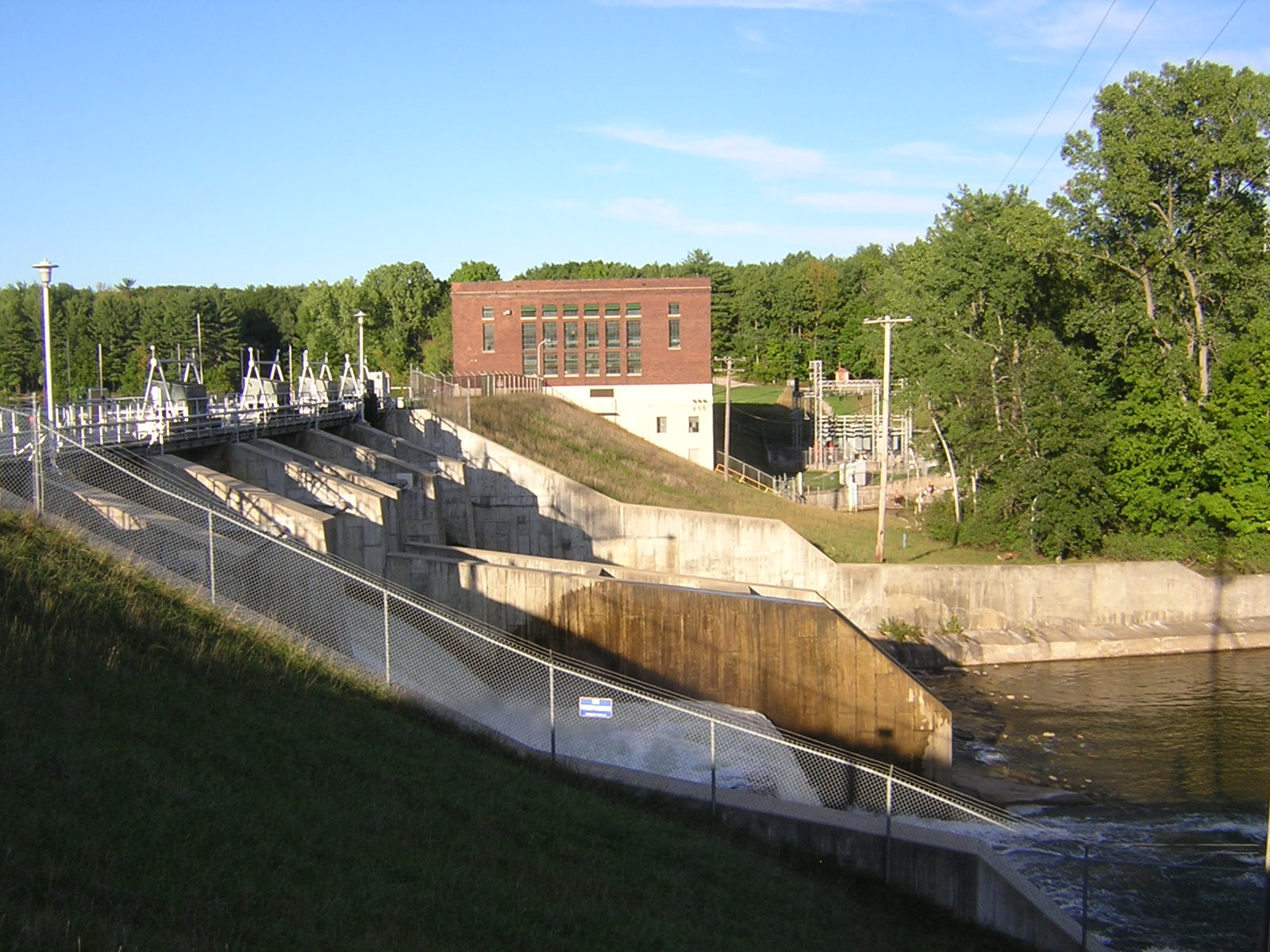
- Dam, powerhouse, and spillway

- Location within the United States
- Country: United States
- Location: Mecosta Township, Michigan
- Coordinates: 43°36′47.77″N 85°28′43.56″W
- Purpose: Power
- Status: Operational
- Construction began: 1905
- Opening date: 1906; 120 years ago
- Owner: Consumers Energy

Dam and spillways
- Type of dam: Embankment, earth-fill
- Impounds: Muskegon River
- Height: 43 ft (13 m)
- Length: 800 ft (240 m)

Reservoir
- Creates: Rogers Dam Pond
- Total capacity: 10,000 acre⋅ft (12,000,000 m^{3})
- Surface area: 810 acres (3.3 km^{2})

Power Station
- Commission date: 1922
- Type: Run-of-the-river
- Hydraulic head: 39.2 ft (11.9 m)
- Turbines: 4 x 1.7 MW Francis-type
- Installed capacity: 6.8 MW

Rogers Dam is an earth-filled embankment dam on the Muskegon River in Mecosta Township, Michigan, United States. It is located about six miles (9.7 km) south of Big Rapids. Construction of the dam began in 1905, and its power plant was commissioned in March 1906. Owned and operated by Consumers Energy, the primary purpose of the dam is hydroelectric power generation. On December 22, 1921, the original 4.5-megawatt (6,000 hp) power plant was destroyed in a fire. It was rebuilt with an increased 6.8-megawatt (9,100 hp) installed capacity in 1922. The rebuild cost approximately $450,000. It is the oldest hydroelectric power plant operated by Consumers Energy, which also owns the Hardy and Croton dams downstream of Rogers Dam.

Consumers Energy has initiated community talks to discuss the future of its 13 hydropower dams, including Rogers Dam.
