= Smart charging =

Method of energy efficiency optimization in battery charging

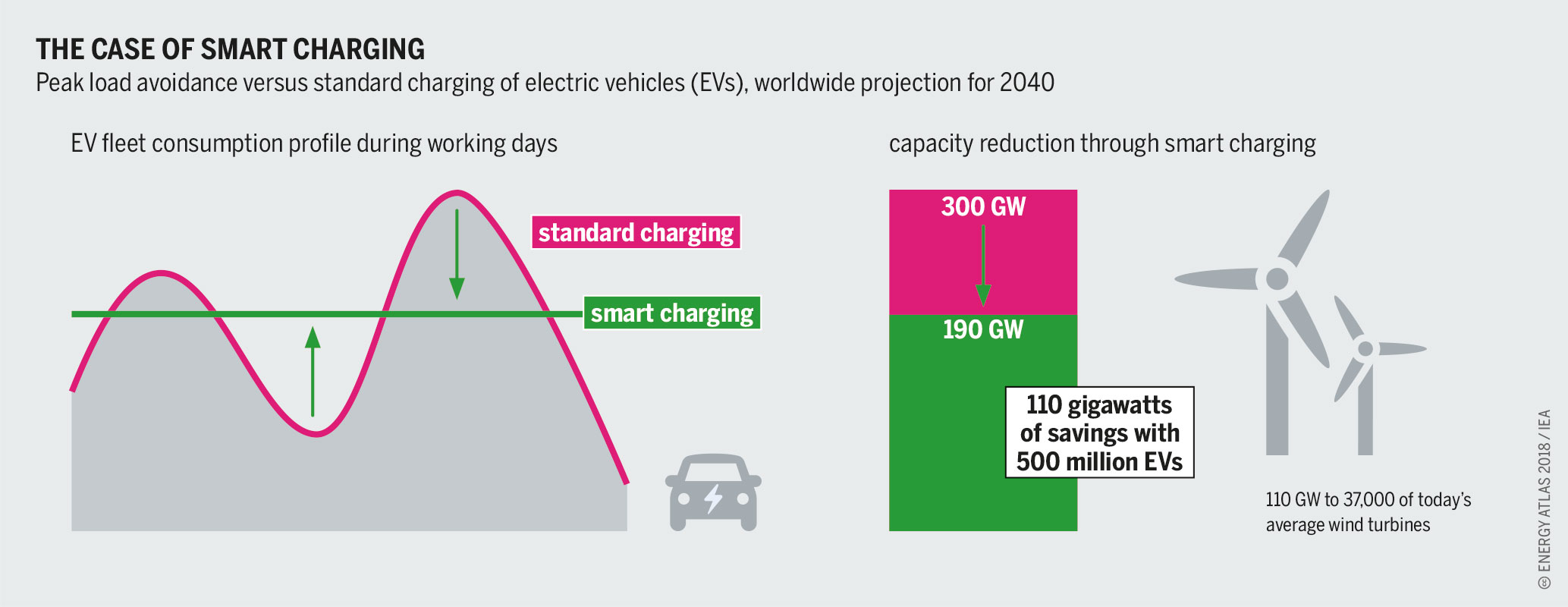
Peak load avoidance by smart charging of electric vehicles

Smart charging is a charging system where electric vehicles, charging stations and charging operators share data connections. Through smart charging, the charging stations may monitor, manage, and restrict the use of charging devices to optimize energy consumption. Comparing with uncontrolled charging, smart charging will flatten the electricity usage peak by shifting the peak due to vehicle charging away from the peak due to other consumption.

Smart charging can be divided into two charging management systems, User-managed charging (UMC) and Supplier-managed charging (SMC).

For UMC, a Time-of-Use tariff is applied, and the customer decides the timing to charge based on the price and needs. The EV charging profile under Time-of-Use tariff is off-peak EV charging, is an abrupt rise in charging load at the time where the electricity pricing goes down. Comparing to peak EV charging profile caused by uncontrolled charging, UMC will delay the peak charging load formation to a specific later time, usually between 9:00 pm and 10:00 pm, depending on electricity pricing regulation.

In SMC, the charging and discharging decision is made based on multiple signals: real-time energy production, local energy consumption, as well as the state of charge information from nearby EVs and other electric devices. A gradual rise in the charging load can be observed within the off-peak hours. Ideally, the EV charging peak is self-adjustable to fit the real-time electricity demand gap at off-peak hours.

== Smart charging Implementation ==
V1G

In UMC systems, electricity pricing with respect to time is a simple form of incentive. EV owners can only get rewarded by adjusting the timing of charging and the rate of charging. This is considered a unidirectional control of vehicles (V1G). V12G may be also referred to as load balancing or load management

V2G

Through SMC networks, in addition to charging decisions, the EVs can also discharge to meet local electricity needs or to mitigate the pressure on electricity demand during peak hours. V2G is a smart charging implementation where the utility/transmission system is capable of purchasing energy from customers, usually during peak hours. Discharging provides extra flexibility to the grid by extending the power range and may shave the peak in electricity production. V2G allows EVs to supply power back to the grid. Owners in active markets can earn USD 500 to 1,500 annually through grid services programs.

== Smart Charging features ==
=== Energy efficiency ===
Smart charging transfers a portion of the peak load to off-peak hours. The predictability of energy demand is also improved because of the capability to use V2G as a backup. Study shows that a smoother and more predictable energy demand curve will boost the proportion of green energy in total energy production.

=== Liability ===
A survey on customer responses to electricity prices in Shanghai shows that, if the peak/off-peak pricing ratio is 2:1, 75% of the customers will adjust their charging pattern to charge off-peak. The percentile reaches 90% if the pricing ratio is 6:1.

== Criticisms and Concerns ==
A survey in the UK on the acceptance rate of UMC versus SMC shows that current and former EV owners are twice more likely to adopt to UMC than SMC. Perceptions among Actual and Potential Plug-in Electric Vehicle Adopters in the United Kingdom) Some of the general concerns are addressed below.

=== Damage due to redundant and incremental charging ===
Studies have proved that fragmental charging will have minimal effect on battery lifetime if the battery state of charge is kept at 70-80%. However, the charging habit survey suggests the majority of the EV owners will "top-up" their vehicle to full charge every day.

=== Difficulty to foresee future trips ===
Another issue is that by adopting to SMC, the battery percentage at every use becomes unclear. This subsequently restrains the flexibility in trips. Possible solutions include improved battery capacity and alternative charging paths.

=== Accelerated charging pressure in car-sharing society ===
Studies have shown that car sharing will lead to a reduction in private vehicle use with a low occupancy rate. However, as the average vehicle use time increase, the parking/charging time will drop. This will bring a challenge to the charging power.

== Government Promotions ==
The United Kingdom Government has mandated that: "All government funded home chargepoints for electric vehicles must use innovative 'smart' technology from July 2019. This means chargepoints must be able to be remotely accessed, and capable of receiving, interpreting and reacting to a signal. Smart charging can also reduce high peaks of electricity demands, minimising the cost of electric vehicles to the electricity system – and keeping costs down for consumers by encouraging off-peak charging."

== Future ==
=== Alternatives to cable charging ===
In a mature smart charging system, the public charging infrastructure should be commercially sustainable. Charging stations locations, cost and the ability to respond to demand shift (i.e. the charging/ discharging power) are the limiting factors. Alternative charging paths can be considered to reduce the costs, spaces and power output associated with charging stations.

=== Continuous charging ===
Continuous charging consists of inductive and conductive charging. Conductive charging uses a charging board to transfer energy. A built-in receiver is required to receive power. Metal contact can be made possible by setting up a chargeable road. Inductive charging uses an electromagnetic field to transfer energy through electromagnetic induction.

=== Battery Swapping ===
As the name suggests, battery swapping eliminates the time to wait for charging at the stations.

== See also ==
- ISO 15118
- IEC 61851
- IEC 63110
- Open Charge Point Protocol
