= Hardy Dam =

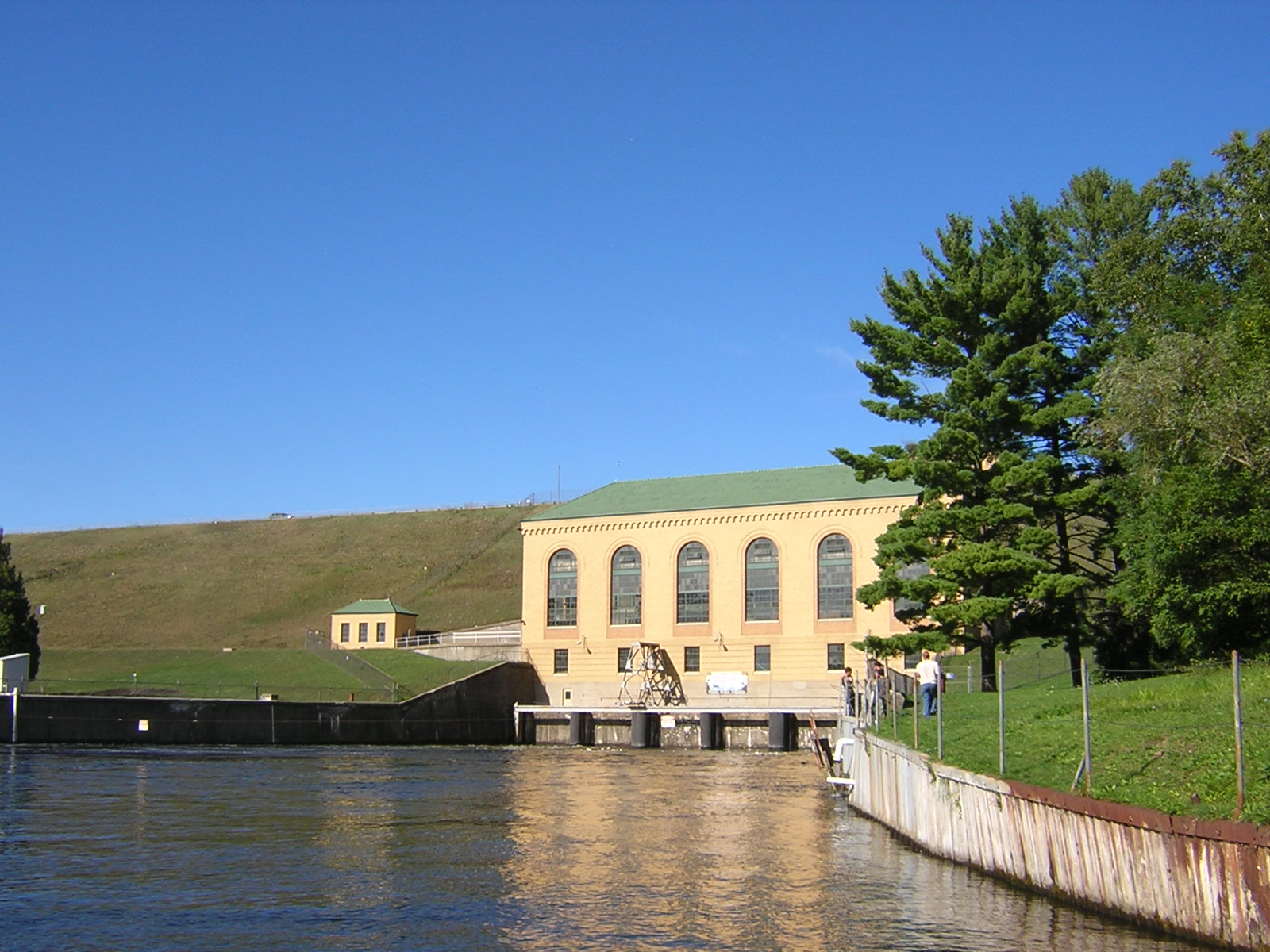
- Hardy Dam and Powerhouse
- Interactive map of Hardy Dam
- Country: United States
- Location: Big Prairie Township, Newaygo County, Michigan
- Purpose: Power
- Status: Operational
- Construction began: 1929
- Opening date: 1931; 95 years ago
- Owner: Consumers Energy

Dam and spillways
- Type of dam: Embankment, earth-fill
- Impounds: Muskegon River
- Height: 120 ft (37 m)
- Length: 2,600 ft (790 m)
- Width (crest): 25 ft (7.6 m)
- Width (base): 1,000 ft (300 m)
- Dam volume: 1,500,000 cu yd (1,100,000 m^{3})

Reservoir
- Total capacity: 134,000 acre⋅ft (165,000,000 m^{3})
- Surface area: 4,000 acres (16 km^{2})

Power Station
- Commission date: 1931
- Type: Conventional
- Hydraulic head: 99 ft (30 m)
- Turbines: 1 x 11.5 MW, 2 x 10 MW Francis-type
- Installed capacity: 31.5 MW
- Hardy Hydroelectric Plant
- U.S. National Register of Historic Places
- Michigan State Historic Site
- Location within Michigan Location within the United States
- Nearest city: Newaygo, Michigan
- Coordinates: 43°29′18″N 85°37′56″W
- Built: 1931
- Architects: Burd, Edward M.
- Architectural style: Spanish Colonial Revival
- NRHP reference No.: 97001479
- Added to NRHP: Dec. 1, 1997

Hardy Dam (or Hardy Hydroelectric Plant) is an earth-filled embankment dam and powerplant complex on the Muskegon River in Big Prairie Township, Newaygo County, Michigan. At the time of its completion, it was the largest earthen dam in North America east of the Mississippi. Its impoundment forms a lake with over 50 miles (80 km) of shoreline. The dam impounds a reservoir with a surface area of 4,000 acres (1,618 ha) and its power plant has an installed capacity of 31.5 MW.

== History ==
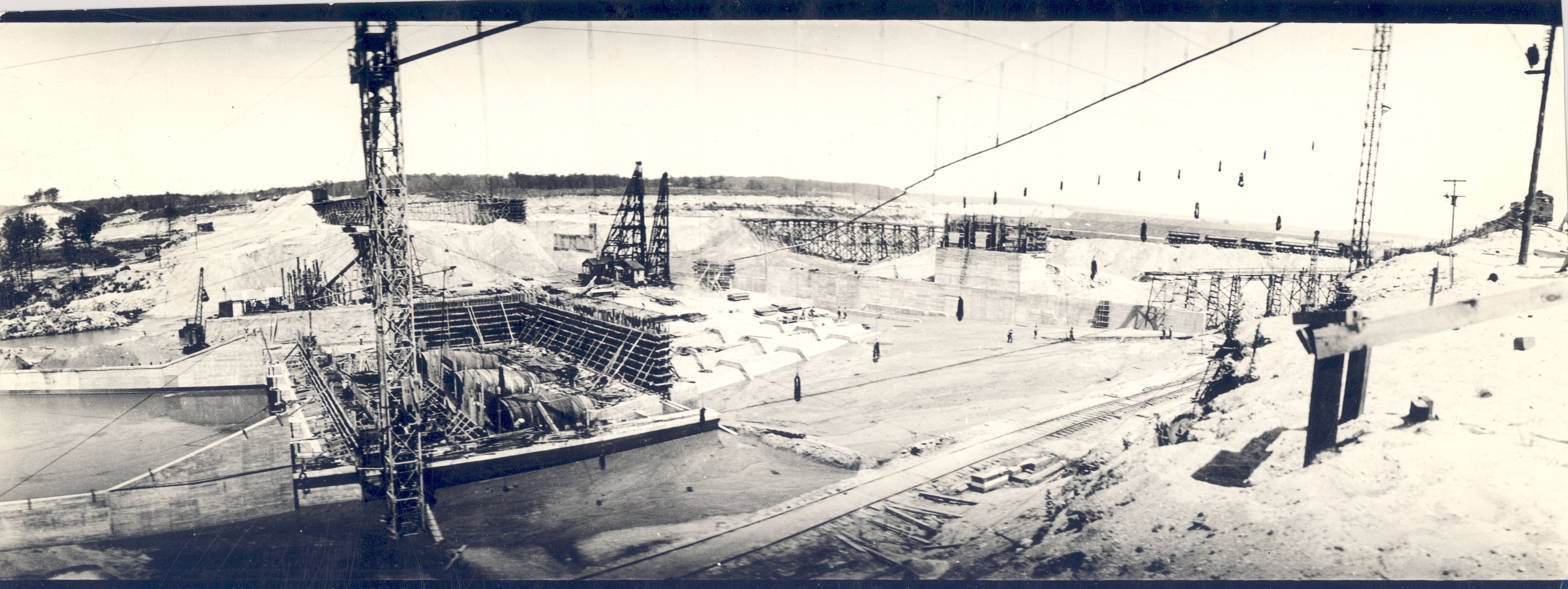
Construction of the dam in 1929

After considerable investigation and planning by Consumers Energy in the 1920s, construction on the Hardy Dam began in 1929. It was designed by William G. Fargo and construction was carried out by his company, Fargo Engineering. Large amounts of concrete were placed into the foundation as solid bedrock was not present, particularly in the streambed. Allied Engineers began constructing the power plant in the autumn of 1929. In August 1930 the Muskegon River was diverted through the power plant penstocks and away from the dam construction site. The embankment of the dam was filled by March 1931 using the semi hydraulic method of construction. About 1,500,000 cu yd (1,100,000 m^{3}) of sand and gravel was used in the dam. Both the dam and power plant were complete by the end of 1931.

Construction was carried out under the direction of Edward M. Burd, the head of civil engineering for Commonwealth Power Corporation, a subsidiary of Consumers. The dam and power plant are named for George E. Hardy, a financial partner with Anton G. Hodenpyl. Hardy and Hodenpyl (who also had a dam named after him) oversaw the Commonwealth & Southern Corporation holding company that Consumers Energy, was part of from 1910 through the 1920s.

A serious flood in September 1986 raised the reservoir 8 ft (2.4 m) above the emergency spillway. Water seeped through joints and underneath the spillway creating voids that were later filled with grout.

Hardy was listed in the National Register of Historic Places on Dec. 1, 1997. The listing notes the Spanish Colonial architecture of the powerplant buildings, including the oil house, intake, dormitory and powerhouse.

In December 2008, the rehabilitation of Unit 3's Francis turbine began. The original 10 MW runner was replaced with one which increased the unit's installed capacity by 1.5 MW. Unit 3 entered back into service on 3 March 2009.

In 2026 Consumers Energy announced plans to sell the Hardy Dam along with 12 other dams to Confluence Dam LLC, in a deal that would allow the private-equity backed firm to resell or stop operating the dams without state approval.

=== Historical marker text ===
Constructed from 1929 to 1931, on a site once known as the Oxbow, the Hardy Hydroelectric Plant was built by Consumers Power Company. The plant was named for George Hardy, a partner in the firm that financed Consumers' projects from 1911 through 1928. The complex includes a Spanish Colonial Revival-style powerhouse and intake tower, an oil house, and a dormitory. It originally included four operator's houses on the eastern bank of the pond, which were Sears-Roebuck kit homes. Due to advancements in fossil fuel steam generating plants, this was the last conventional hydroelectric plant built by Consumers. The Hardy plant is listed in the National Register of Historic Places.

== Recreation ==
Approximately 2,000 campsites, several boat launches and a marina are located around the dam. The parks located on the impoundment lake of the Hardy Dam include, Newaygo County's Sandy Beach Park, Newaygo State Park, Mecosta County's Brower Park, and Big Prairie Township's Ox Bow Park and Big Bend Park.

The reservoir offers excellent fishing and a nature trail system regarded as one of the best. The three mile unpaved path parallels the Muskegon River and contains 26 different trees with identification plaques. The trail area is home to wild turkeys, grouse and bald eagles as well as beaver, mink and otter. Fishing includes salmon, steel head, rainbow trout, brown trout, walleye, bass, perch and other pan fish.

== The Muskegon dam system ==
The three dams, Rogers, Hardy, and Croton (all owned and operated by Consumers Energy), are operated in different modes but in concert give a net run of river effect on water flow. The Rogers itself has little or no impoundment and runs in run of river mode, passing through as much water as it receives. The Croton and Hardy work in concert. The Hardy, which has a larger capacity reservoir, larger turbines, and is upstream of the Croton, runs in full peaking mode, meaning that the river flow is impounded and used to generate electricity during peak demand periods. This causes wide fluctuations in water flows and reservoir levels, typically with low outflow during the night when power demand is lowest. Full peaking was once very common but because of the outflow fluctuations, is now less common. However, with the Croton immediately downstream, and with no river segment (the Croton impoundment stretches back to the Hardy outlet), it can be run in re-regulation mode, allowing a natural flow rate to exit. The Croton reservoir level fluctuates inversely with the Hardy, rising during the day and lowering at night. Since the Hardy reservoir is so large, its reservoir level fluctuates about 4 inches (10 cm) in total, while the Croton reservoir fluctuates about 9 inches (23 cm). During the winter and spring runoff, the Hardy is allowed to fluctuate much more. It can be drawn down up to 12 feet (4 m) to meet winter power demand but is required to return to normal levels by the end of April each spring.

Together, the three dams of the Muskegon River (Rogers, Hardy and Croton) can generate about 45,500 kilowatts, with about 30,000 of that from Hardy, which is enough electricity to serve a community of nearly 23,000.

== See also ==
- List of Registered Historic Places in Newaygo County, Michigan
