= Tangential firing =

Tangential firing is a method of firing a fuel to heat air in thermal power stations. The flame envelope rotates ensuring thorough mixing within the furnace, providing complete combustion and uniform heat distribution.

== Overview ==
The most effective method for producing intense turbulence is by the impingement of one flame on another. This action is secured through the use of burners located in each of the four corners of the furnace, close to the floor or the water-screen. The burner nozzles are so directed that the streams of coal and air are projected along a line tangent to a small circle, lying in a horizontal plane, at the center of the furnace. Intensive mixing occurs where these streams meet. A scrubbing action is present which assures contact between the combustible and oxygen, thus promoting rapid combustion and reducing carbon loss. A rotative motion, similar to that of a cyclone, is imparted to the flame body, which spreads out and fills the furnace area. The ignition at each burner is aided by the flame from the preceding one.

== Advantages ==
With tangential firing the furnace is essentially the burner, consequently air and coal quantities need not be accurately proportional to the individual fuel nozzle assemblies. Turbulence produced in the furnace cavity is sufficient to combine all the fuel and air. This continuously ensures uniform and complete combustion so that test performance can be maintained throughout daily operation. With other types of firing the fuel and air must be accurately proportioned to individual burners making it difficult to always equal test results.

With this type of firing, combustion is extremely rapid, and short flame length results. The mixing is so intense that combustion rates exceeding 35,000 Btu/(ft^{3}·h) or 360 kW/m^{3} are practical under certain conditions. However, since there is considerable impingement of flame over the furnace walls it is absolutely necessary that they be fully water-cooled. This sweeping of the water-cooled surfaces, in the furnace, by the gas increases the evaporation rate. Thus, in addition to absorption by radiation from the flame envelope, there is transfer by convection, and the resulting furnace temperatures are lower than with other types of burners, even though the heat liberation rates may be somewhat higher. Tangentially fired furnaces are usually clean in the upper zone and, as a result, both the furnace and the boiler are comparatively free from objectionable slag deposits.
