= Muskegon River =

River in Michigan, United States

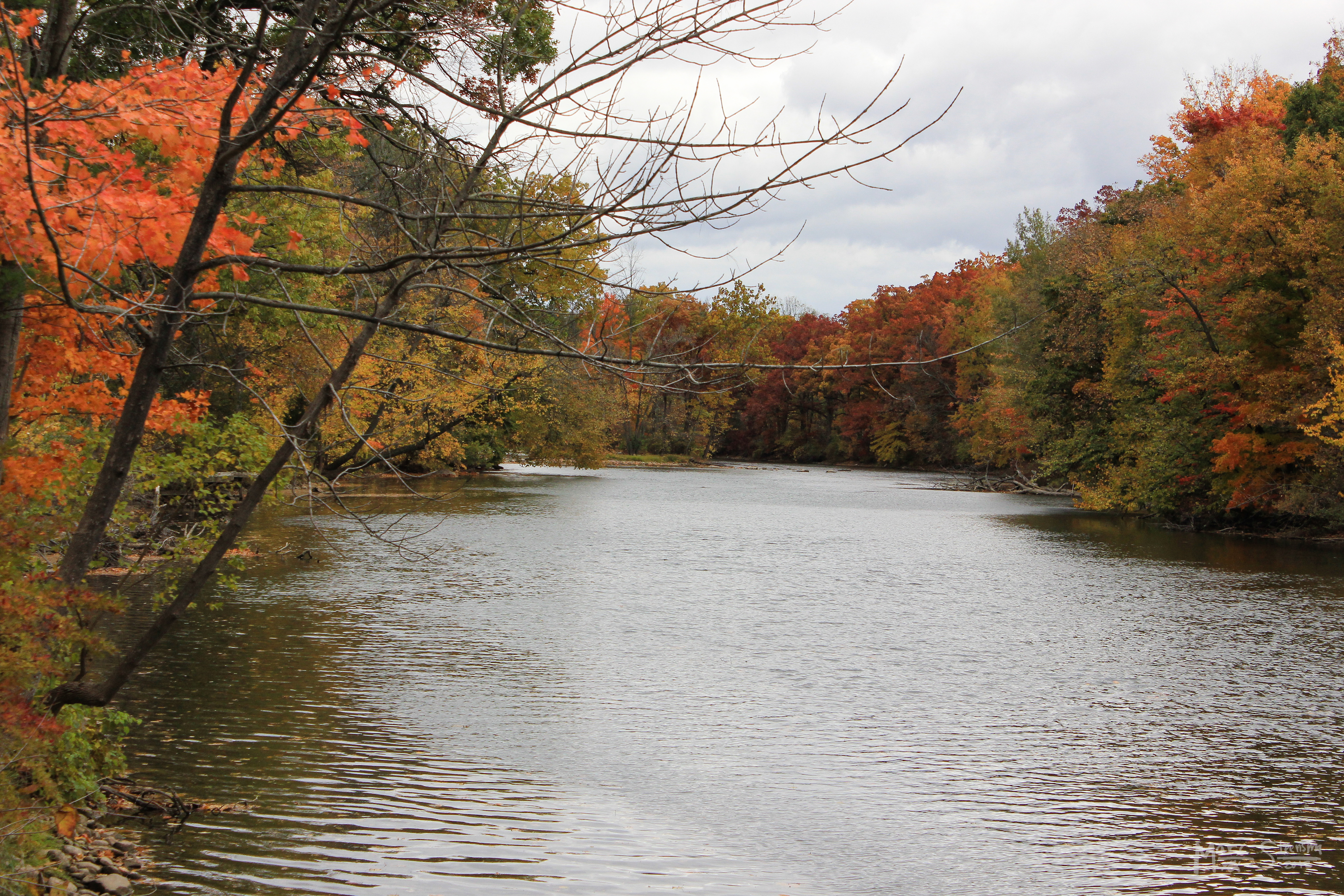
- Muskegon River near Newaygo, MI in September 2012

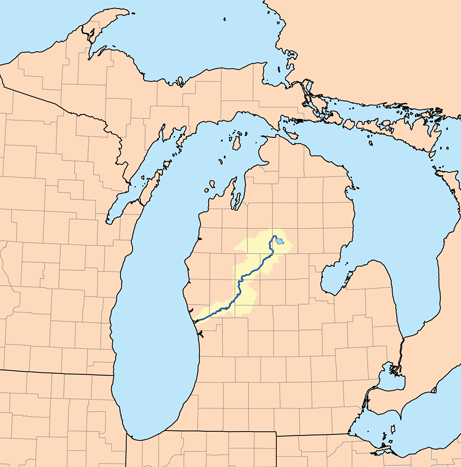
- Map of the Muskegon River

Location
- Country: United States
- State: Michigan
- Cities: Evart, Big Rapids, Croton, Newaygo, Muskegon

Physical characteristics
- Source: Houghton Lake
  - location: Roscommon County, MI
  - coordinates: 44°23′58″N 84°47′27″W
- Mouth: Muskegon Lake
  - location: Muskegon, MI
  - coordinates: 43°15′41″N 86°14′53″W
- Length: 216 mi (348 km)
- Basin size: 2,350 sq mi (6,100 km^{2})
- Discharge
  - location: Muskegon, MI

The Muskegon River (/məˈskiːɡən/ mə-SKEE-gən) is a 216-mile-long (348 km) river in the Lower Peninsula of the U.S. state of Michigan. From its source at Houghton Lake in Roscommon County, the river flows in a generally southwesterly direction to its mouth at Lake Michigan at the eponymous city of Muskegon. The river drains an area of 2,350 square miles (6,100 km^{2}), and collects a number of tributaries, including the Little Muskegon River, Hersey River, and Clam River.

In September 2002, an article in National Geographic raised concerns about a controversial deal made with Nestlé Waters North America, giving them permission "to bottle up to 210 million gallons (about 800 million liters) a year from an aquifer north of Grand Rapids, Michigan that recharges the Muskegon River".

== Description of the watershed ==
The Muskegon River watershed drains 2,350 square miles (6,100 km2) from ten counties in north central Michigan: Muskegon, Newaygo, Mecosta, Clare, Osceola, and Roscommon. The watershed flows through the cities of Muskegon, Newaygo, Big Rapids, Evart, and Houghton Lake. The river follows a southwesterly route through north central Michigan from its headwaters at Houghton Lake to its mouth at Muskegon Lake, which ultimately empties into Lake Michigan.

There are three man-made reservoirs on the Muskegon River, the Rogers Dam Pond, Hardy Dam Pond, and the Croton Dam Pond. All three dams on the river are owned and operated by Consumers Power for power generation purposes. Rogers Dam is located in Mecosta County south of Big Rapids, with Hardy Dam and Croton Dam located in Newaygo County.

== History ==
Like many of its neighboring streams, the Muskegon was one of the favored logging rivers during the boom years of the 1880s-1890s. Remnants of stray logs embedded on the river bottom, left over from the spring logging runs, can still be seen along the river. The river is significant to the Algonquian peoples for fishing and hunting.

Winfield Scott Gerrish established a seven-mile-long logging railroad from Lake George to the Muskegon River. However, there were several Michigan logging railroads in operation in the 1850s, including the seven-mile-long Blendon Lumber Company railroad in Ottawa County, which was the first in the state to employ a steam locomotive in May 1857.

== Wildlife ==
There is abundant wildlife, including black bear, otters, waterfowl, white-tailed deer, and bald eagles and, despite increasing development, some areas are still fairly remote and natural with much of the surrounding land consisting of state-owned tracts.

The Muskegon State Game Area is an 8,411 acre section of land which overlays the Muskegon River on the section between Maple Island Road and US Route 31. This state game area is accessible for licensed hunters. Permits can be obtained for whitetail deer hunting and waterfowl hunting. The Muskegon State Game Area spans both Muskegon County and Newaygo County.

== Recreation ==
- The river is popular for recreational fishing for long nosed gar, large migratory steelhead, brown trout and planted Chinook Salmon.
- Due to its slow speed and length (being shorter only than the Grand River), the river is popular for Kayaking and Canoeing.

Camping is another popular activity around the river, with several shoreline parks and campgrounds. Hunting is popular in the forests near by on public hunting land.

== Crossings ==
List of Bridge Crossings
| Route | Type | City | County | Location |
|---|---|---|---|---|
| M-120 | State Highway | Muskegon | Muskegon | 43°15′16.53″N 86°14′10″W |
| US 31 | US Route | Muskegon | Muskegon | 43°15′46.22″N 86°12′12.82″W |
| Maple Island Road | County Highway | | Muskegon | 43°19′5.34″N 86°2′20.11″W |
| Warner Avenue | County Highway | | Newaygo | 43°20′50.16″N 85°56′23.23″W |
| Bridge Street | City Street | Newaygo | Newaygo | 43°25′1.02″N 85°48′29.51″W |
| M-37 | State Highway | Newaygo | Newaygo | 43°25′22.36″N 85°47′53.80″W |
| Croton Dam Pond Road | County Road | | Newaygo | 43°26′6.003″N 85°39′54.41″W |
| Hardy Dam Pond Road | County Road | | Newaygo | 43°29′13.099″N 85°37′45.57″W |
| M-20 | State Highway | | Mecosta | 43°35′2.19″N 85°31′34.85″W |
| US 131 | US Route | | Mecosta | 43°36′29.87″N 85°29′36.08″W |
| South State Street | County Road | Big Rapids | Mecosta | 43°36′27.53″N 85°28′50.43″W |
| Maple Street | City Street | Big Rapids | Mecosta | 43°41′55.32″N 85°28′35.14″W |
| Riverwalk | Pedestrian Bridge | Big Rapids | Mecosta | |
| Baldwin Street | City Street | Big Rapids | Mecosta | 43°42′31.90″N 85°28′53.45″W |
| White Pine Trail | Non-Motorized Path | | Mecosta | 43°43′44.36″N 85°29′15.44″W |
| Hoover Road | County Road | | Mecosta | 43°46′43.68″N 85°30′0.83″W |
| Hersey Road | County Road | | Osceola | 43°50′50.46″N 85°25′56.10″W |
| Carlson Road | County Road | | Osceola | 43°52′21.52″N 85°21′26.33″W |
| South Main Street | City Street | Evart | Osceola | 43°53′42.37″N 85°15′33.95″W |
| US 10 | US Route | Evart | Osceola | 43°54′3.46″N 85°15′17.06″W |
| Pere Marquette Trail | Non-Motorized Path | | Osceola | 43°54′2.51″N 85°15′16.11″W |
| 50th Avenue | County Road | | Osceola | 43°56′2.87″N 85°11′17.98″W |
| M-66 | Michigan Highway | | Osceola | 43°52′21.52″N 85°21′26.33″W |
| M-115 | Michigan Highway | | Osceola | 43°59′10.23″N 85°5′24.82″W |
| Railroad | Railroad | | Clare | 44°1′51.24″N 85°5′24.82″W |
| M-61 | Michigan Highway | | Clare | 44°2′14.42″N 85°2′0.99″W |
| Leota Road | County Road | | Missaukee | 44°8′19.66″N 84°53′53.59″W |
| Cadillac Road | County Road | | Missaukee | 44°14′55.15″N 84°53′47.35″W |
| M-55 | Michigan Highway | | Missaukee | 44°20′6.29″N 84°53′22.74″W |
| US 127 | US Route | | Roscommon | 44°24′32.27″N 84°47′42.47″W |
| Harrison Road | County Road | | Roscommon | 44°24′14.87″N 84°47′27.53″W |

There are approximately 31 bridge crossings over the Muskegon River waterway. These bridge crossing include motorized vehicle crossings, railroads, and several pedestrian/bicycle trail crossings. The majority of the bicycle and pedestrian trail crossings are former railroad bridges which have been converted to non-motorized traffic.

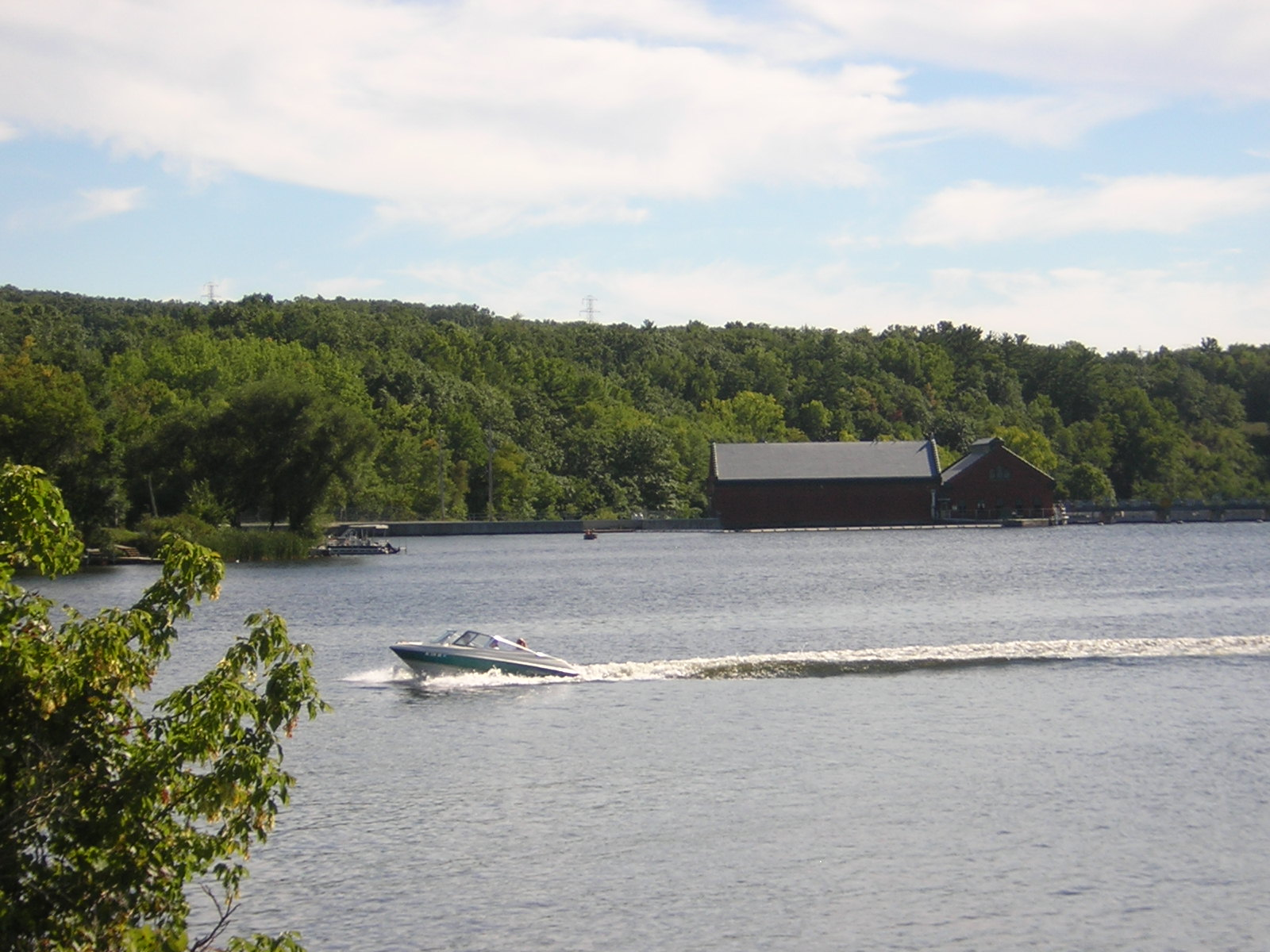
Boater on Croton Dam Pond

== Dams ==
The three major dams of the Muskegon River (Rogers, Hardy and Croton) generate about 45,600 kilowatts, with about 30,000 of that from Hardy Dam. This provides enough electricity to serve a community of nearly 23,000. The smaller Reedsburg Dam is near the source of the Muskegon River.

| Name | Height | Purpose(s) | Capacity (MW) | Year | Owner name | Reservoir name | Coordinates | Comments |
|---|---|---|---|---|---|---|---|---|
| Croton | 40 ft (12.2 m) | Hydroelectric | 8.85 | 1907 | Consumers Energy | Croton Dam Pond | 43.43714°N 85.66382°W | |
| Hardy | 106 ft (32.3 m) | Hydroelectric | 30 | 1931 | Consumers Energy | Hardy Dam Pond | 43.48656°N 85.6296°W | |
| Reedsburg | N/A | Flood control | N/A | 1940 | Michigan DNR | Dead Stream Flooding | 44.35612°N 84.8593°W | |
| Rogers | 43 ft (13.1 m) | Hydroelectric | 6.75 | 1906 | Consumers Energy | Rogers Dam Pond | 43.61320°N 85.47894°W | |
| Total | | | 45.6 | | | | | |

== Cities and towns along the river ==
- Houghton Lake, Michigan
- Leota, Michigan
- Evart, Michigan
- Hersey, Michigan
- Big Rapids, Michigan
- Newaygo, Michigan
- Muskegon, Michigan

== See also ==
- Houghton Lake
- Lake Michigan
- List of rivers in Michigan
