= List of power stations in Michigan =

Sources of Michigan utility-scale electricity generation in gigawatt-hours, full-year 2025:
1. Natural gas: 53,148 (41.3%)
2. Coal: 29,308 (22.8%)
3. Nuclear: 27,534 (21.4%)
4. Wind: 10,116 (7.87%)
5. Solar: 2,860 (2.22%)
6. Biomass: 2,097 (1.63%)
7. Petroleum: 1,733 (1.35%)
8. Hydroelectric: 1,336 (1.04%)
9. Other gases: 352 (0.27%)
10. Other: 88 (0.07%)

This is a list of electricity-generating power stations in Michigan, sorted by type and name. In 2024, Michigan had a total summer capacity of 32.1 GW through all of its power plants, and a net generation of 124,200 GWh. In 2025, the energy mix was 41.3% natural gas, 22.8% coal, 21.4% nuclear, 7.9% wind, 2.2% solar, 1.6% biomass, 1.4% petroleum, 1% hydroelectric, 0.3% other gases, and less than 0.1% other. Coal use has decreased by half over the last decade, replaced by natural gas and renewables. 60% of renewable generation is wind energy.

Michigan imports all coal and nuclear fuel (uranium), and 82% of natural gas. A goal to produce over 10% of electricity from in-state renewable sources was set in 2015. Major electric companies in Michigan include DTE Electric Company (11,000 MW) and Consumers Energy (9,000 MW).

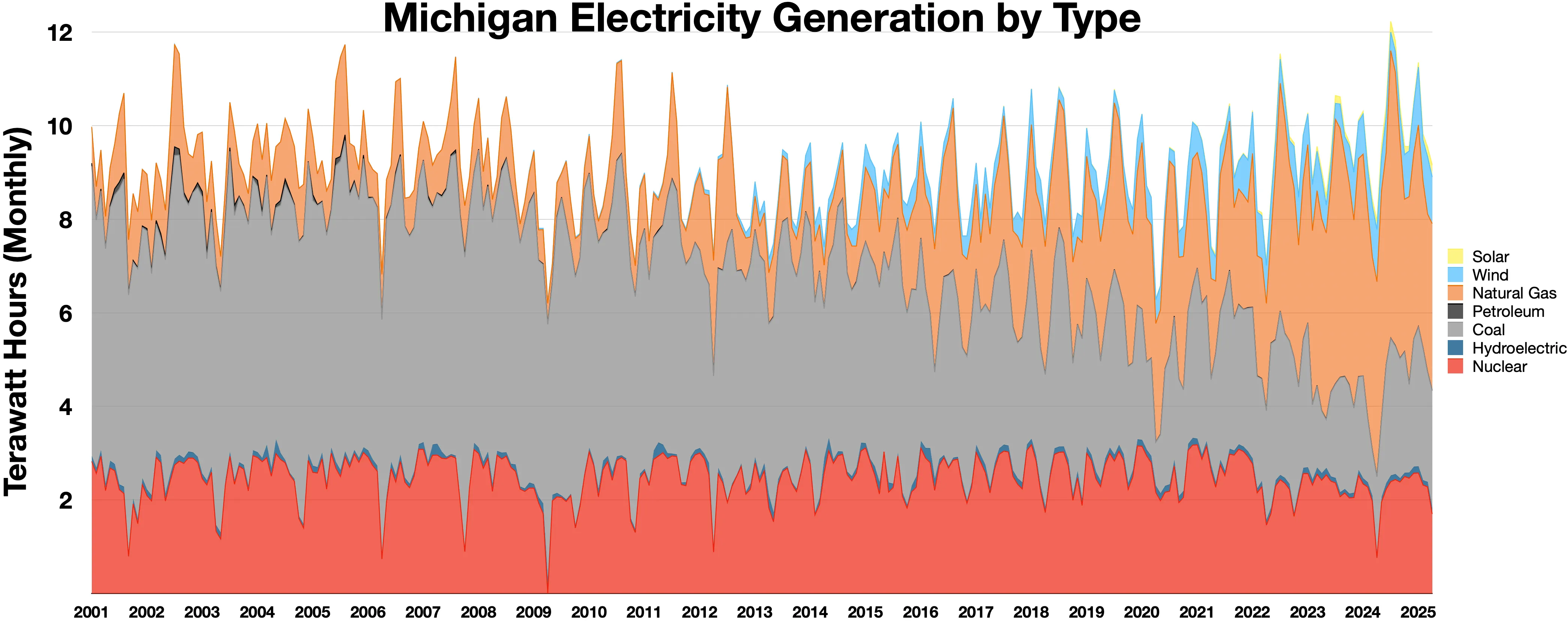
Michigan electricity generation by type

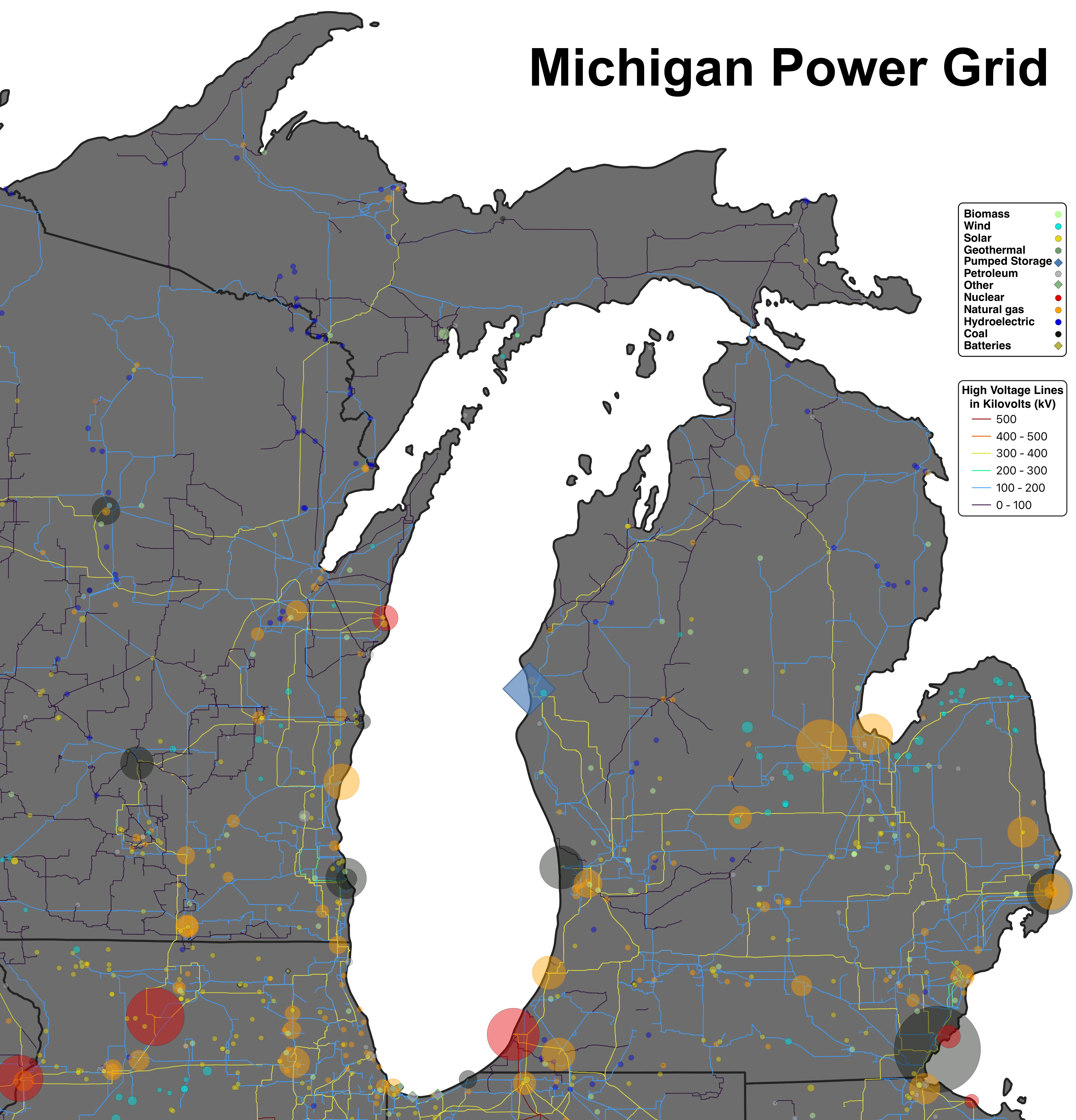
Michigan power grid

== Nuclear power stations ==
Nuclear power is a significant source of electrical power in Michigan, producing roughly one-quarter of the state's supply. The two active nuclear power plants supply Michigan with less than 30% of its electricity.

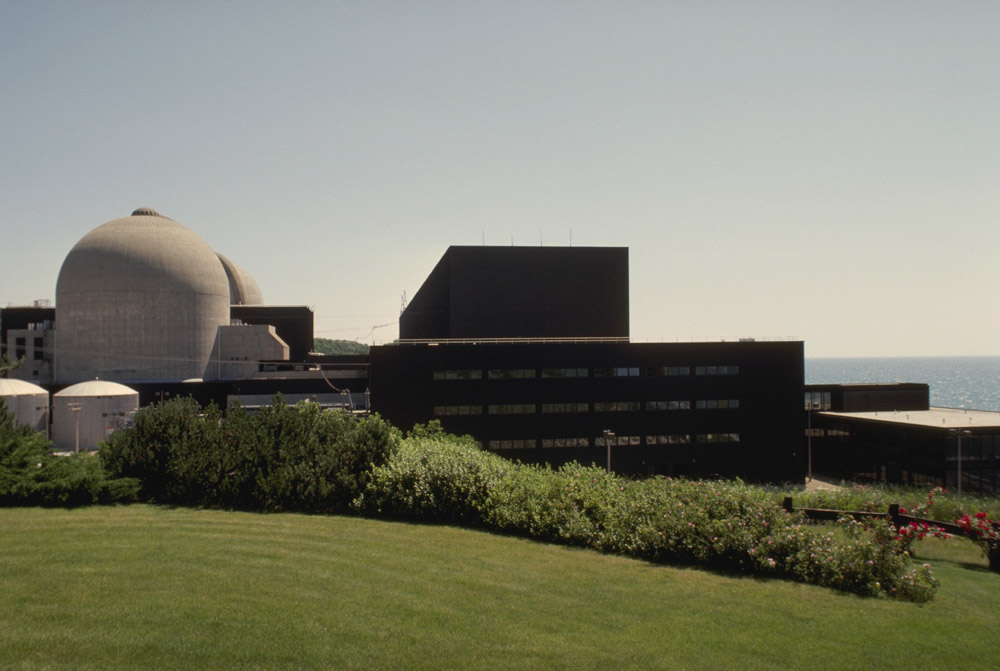
Cook Nuclear Power Plant

Plant	Location	Power (MW)	Notes
Donald C. Cook Nuclear Power Plant	Bridgman	2110	online 1975
Enrico Fermi Nuclear Generating Station (Unit 2)	Monroe	1098	online 1988

=== Former nuclear power stations ===
Plant	Location	Power (MW)	Notes
Big Rock Point Nuclear Power Plant	Charlevoix	67	1962-1997
Enrico Fermi Nuclear Generating Station (Unit 1)	Monroe	94	1957-1972
Palisades Nuclear Power Plant	South Haven	800	1971–2022, planned reopening 2025

See also Midland Cogeneration Venture, a plant abandoned before completion.

== Coal power stations ==
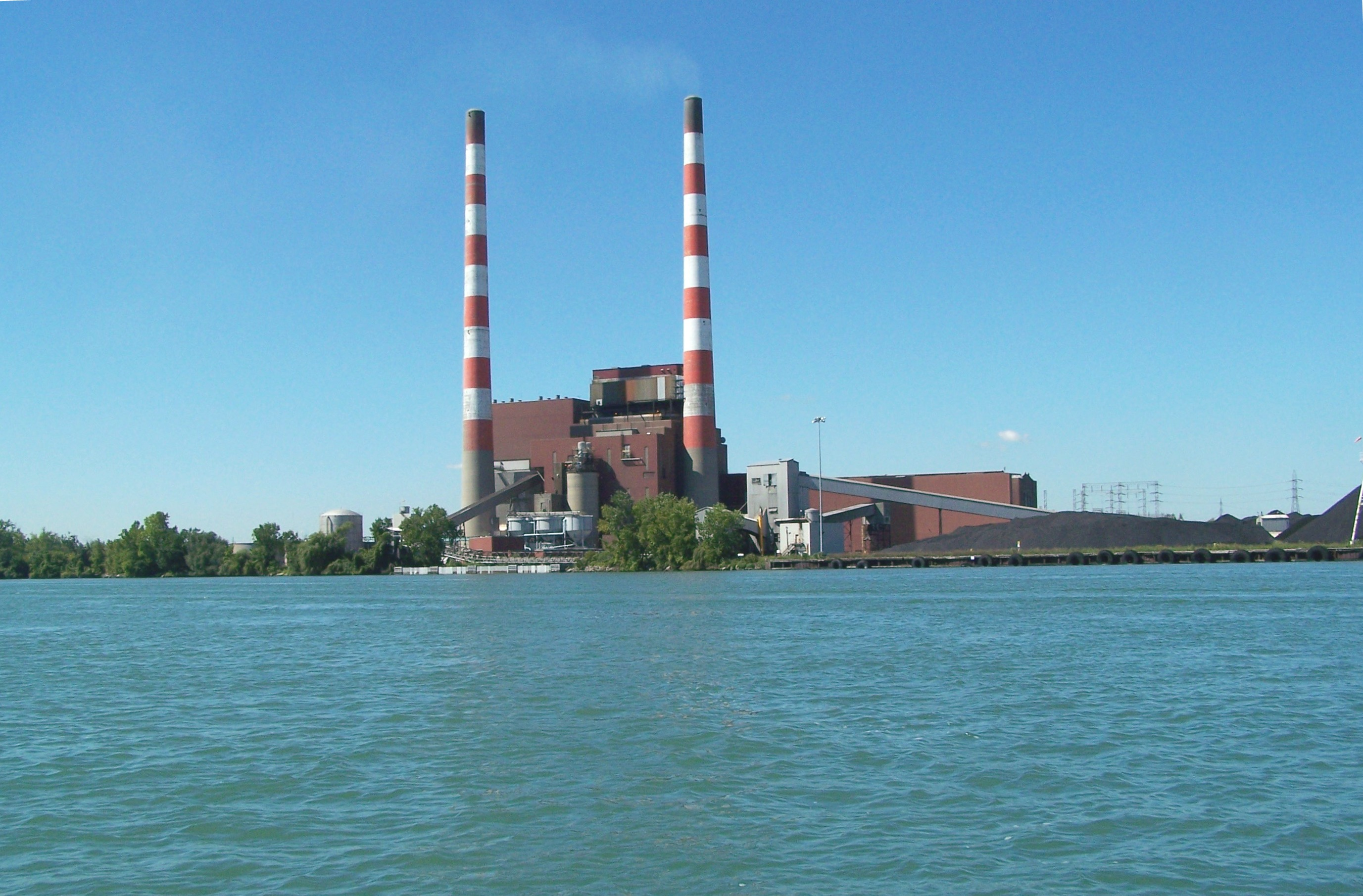
Trenton Power Plant

Coal power is the second leading source of electricity in Michigan. Although Michigan has no active coal mines, coal is easily moved from other states by train and across the Great Lakes by lake freighters. The lower price of natural gas is leading to the closure of most coal plants, with Consumer Energy planning to close all of its remaining coal plants by 2025, and DTE planning to retire 2100MW of coal power by 2023. All coal plants in Michigan are scheduled to close by 2032.

Plant	Location	Power (MW)	Notes
Belle River Power Plant	St. Clair	1395	Repowering to natural gas in 2026.
Filer City Station	Filer City	70	Repowering to biomass by 2030.
J.H. Campbell Power Plant	Port Sheldon Township	1560	Units 1, 2 and 3 scheduled for closure in 2025 (1,391 MW).
Monroe Power Plant	Monroe	3400	Scheduled for closure in 2032.

=== Former coal plants ===
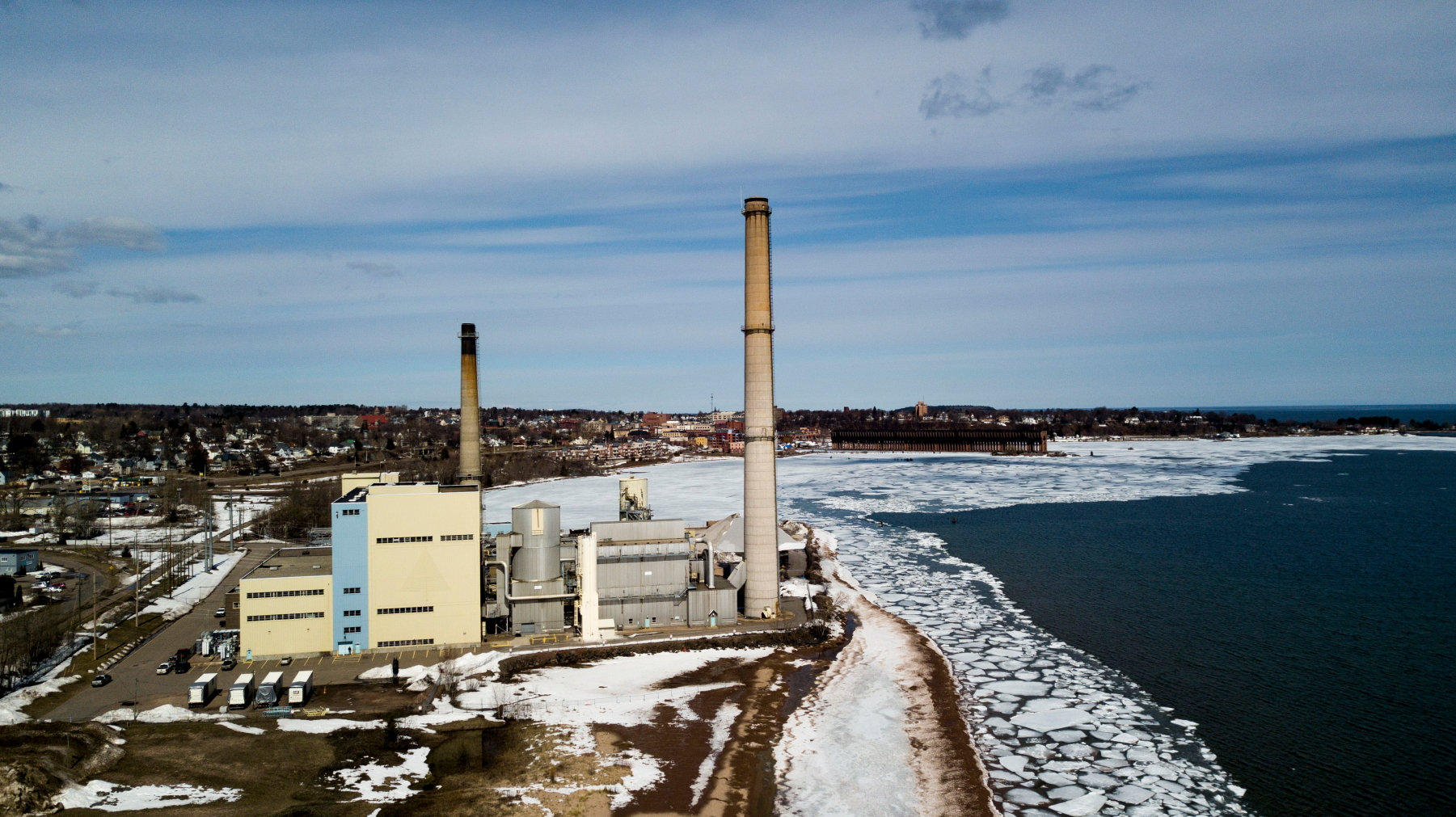
Shiras Steam Plant after decommissioning, before demolition

Plant	Location	Power (MW)	Notes
B.C. Cobb Power Plant	Muskegon	320	Closed in April 2016.
Bayside Power Plant	Traverse City		Decommissioned in 2005 after it had only served as an option for power generation during peak consumptions times for several years.
Conners Creek Power Plant	Detroit		"Seven Sisters", imploded August 10, 1996
Conners Creek Power Plant	Detroit	240	"Two Brothers", originally coal-fired, later natural gas, closed 1988, demolished 2019
D.E. Karn Generating Plant	Hampton Township	544	Units 1 and 2 closed in June 2023 (272MW), units 3 and 4 re-powered to fuel oil and natural gas, planned to close by 2031 (272MW)
Delray Power Plant	Detroit		
Eckert Power Plant	Lansing	240	Units 4-6 closed n December 2020. Unit 2 closed in 2014, units 1 and 3 closed in 2015.
Endicott Generating Station	Litchfield	55	Closed in May 2016.
Erickson Power Plant	Lansing	155	Closed in November 2022.
Escanaba Generating Station	Escanaba	23	Closed in June 2015.
Ford Rouge Power Plant	Dearborn	345	Ran on coal with blast furnace gas and natural gas.
GM Pontiac Power Plant	Pontiac	29	Closed in 2009.
Harbor Beach Power Plant	Harbor Beach	121	Closed in November 2013.
J.B. Sims Power Plant	Grand Haven	80	Closed in February 2020.
J.R. Whiting Power Plant	Monroe	328	Closed in April 2016.
James De Young Power Plant	Holland	63	Ceased burning coal in April 2016, closed in 2017, and was demolished in 2023
J.C. Weadock Generating Plant	Hampton Township	310	Closed in April 2016.
Marysville Power Plant	Marysville	150	"Mighty Marysville" imploded November 7, 2015.
Presque Isle Power Plant	Marquette	431	Replaced in March 2019 with two new natural gas plants.
River Rouge Power Plant	River Rouge	840	One unit retired 2008, one in 2015, the last in 2021.
S.D. Warren Power Plant	Muskegon	51	Closed in 2009.
Shiras Station	Marquette	78	Closed in 2018.
St. Clair Power Plant	St. Clair	1378	Closed in May 2022. Largest power plant in the world in 1969.
Trenton Channel Power	Trenton	566	Closed in June 2022
White Pine Power Plant	White Pine	40	Can also run on natural gas. Closed in 2019.

== Natural gas power stations ==
Michigan has some of its own natural gas production and is a leading state for natural gas transport and storage. Declining prices for natural gas in the early 21st century led to an increase in the number of natural gas power plants. Consumers Energy announced a new 700 MW plant to be built near Flint beginning about 2015, while the city of Holland replaced its coal plant with a 114 MW natural gas plant. In April 2018, DTE received permission for a 1,100 MW natural gas plant to replace a coal plant in St. Clair.

Plant	Location	Power (MW)	Notes
48th Street Generation Station	Holland	142	Two of the three units can use fuel oil.
A.J. Mihm Generating Station	L'Anse	54.9	
Alpine Generating Facility	Elmira	440	General Electric F class
Belle River Power Plant	East China Township, Michigan	256	3x General Electric 7EA simple cycle gas turbines
Blue Water Energy Center	East China Township, Michigan	1150	Natural gas-fueled combined-cycle, started operation in 2022
D.E. Karn Generating Plant	Hampton Township	272	Can run on fuel oil and natural gas
Dean Peaking Station	East China Township, Michigan	336	4x General Electric 7EA simple cycle gas turbines
Dearborn Industrial Generation	Dearborn	710	In the Ford River Rouge Complex, natural gas with blast furnace gas
Delray Peaking Facility	Detroit	127	
Delta Energy Park	Delta Township	226	Lansing Board of Water and Light
F.D. Kuester Generating Station	Negaunee Township	128.1	
Hancock	Commerce Township	141	
Hersey	Hersey Township	50	2 simple-cycle Rolls-Royce RB 211 aero turbines
Holland Energy Park	Holland	130	
Indeck Niles Power Plant	Niles	1084	Built 2022
Jackson Generating Station	Jackson	564	Owned and operated by Consumers Energy
Kalamazoo River Generating Station	Comstock	68	
Livingston Generating Station	Gaylord	156	
Marquette Energy Center	Marquette	50	
Michigan Power	Ludington	123	
Midland Cogeneration Venture	Midland	1560	Re-purposed from a never completed nuclear plant
Mistersky Gas Power Plant	Detroit	154	
New Covert Generating Facility	Covert, Michigan	1159	
REO Town Cogeneration Plant	Lansing, Michigan	110	Also produces steam
Renaissance Power	Carson City	660	
River Rouge Power Plant	River Rouge	260	Unit 1
Sumpter Plant	Sumpter	340	4x General Electric 7EA simple cycle gas turbines
T. B. Simon Power Plant	East Lansing	100	Switched to natural gas in April 2016
Thetford	Genesee	222	
University of Michigan Central Power Plant	Ann Arbor	60	
Vestaburg	Richland Township	20	
Wyandotte Municipal Power Plant	Wyandotte	73	Formerly used coal, natural gas and tire derived fuel
Zeeland Generating Station	Zeeland	868	

== Oil power stations ==
Fuel oils and other liquid fuels are only minorly used in Michigan for power generation. Some units burn liquid fuel only, while some multiple fuel units sometimes use liquid fuels as well.

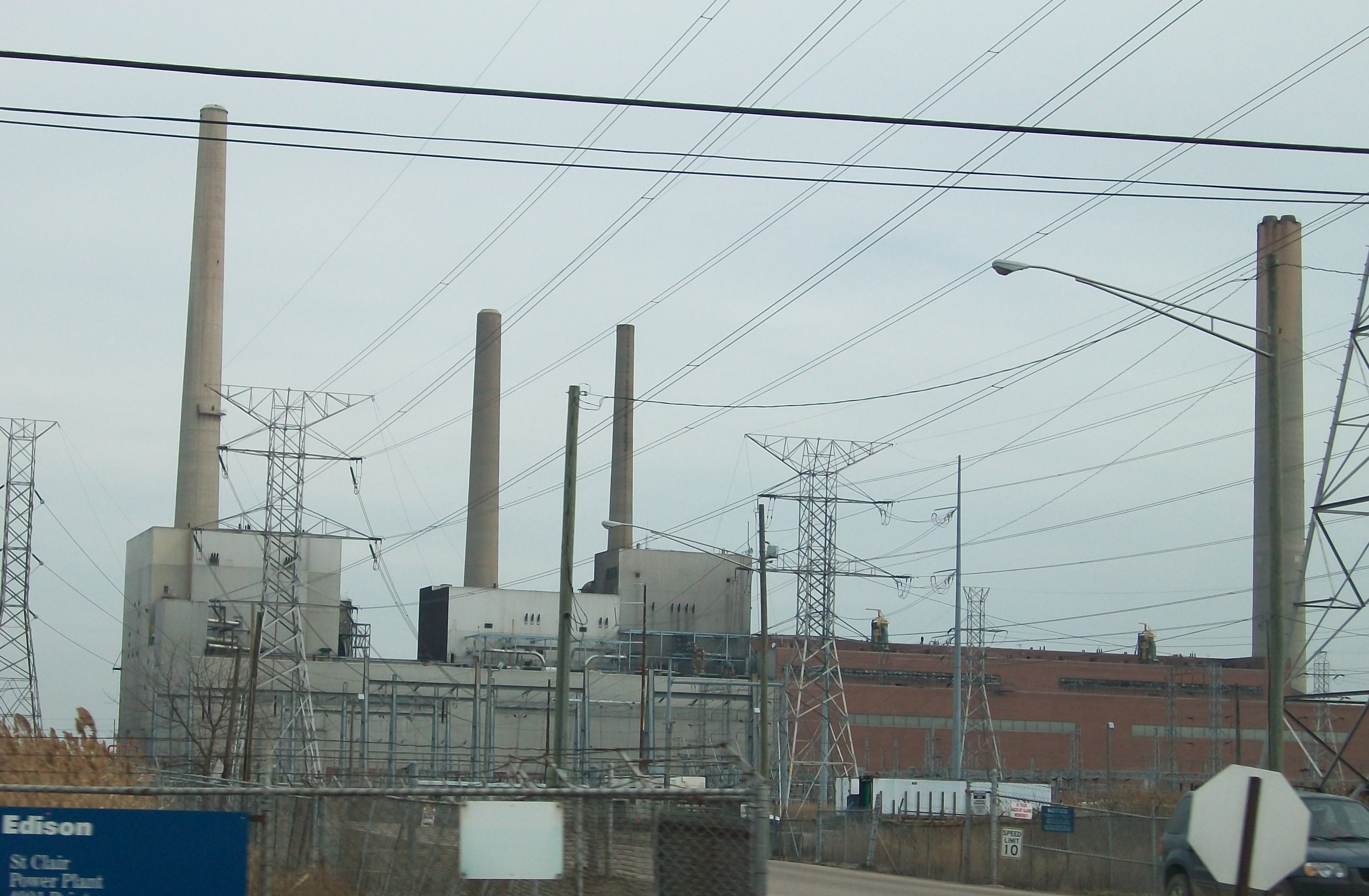
St. Clair Power Plant

Plant	Location	Power (MW)	Notes
Belle River Power Plant	St. Clair	14	Units IC1, IC2, 3, 4, and 5
Dafter	Dafter	7.2	Built December 2021
St. Clair Power Plant	St. Clair	24	Units 11 and 12
Superior Peaking Station	Superior Township	76	Oil-fired (#2) combustion turbines installed 1966. Also has 300 HP black-start diesel engine.

=== Former plants ===
Plant	Location	Power (MW)	Notes
6th Street Generating Station	Holland	22	Closed June 2023
Grand Haven Diesel Plant	Grand Haven	22	Uses a mix of #2 oil and biofuel. Engine #1 built in 1929, closed June 2020.
Newberry Power	Newberry	4.5	Last used in 2019, closed March 2023
Vestaburg	Richland Township	6	Petroleum liquids, closed 2017
William Beaumont Hospital	Royal Oak	4	Petroleum liquids, closed 2022

== Multiple-fuel ==
Multiple-fuel units may alter their fuel source depending to balance pricing, availability, and energy content.

Plant	Location	Power (MW)	Notes
Dan E. Karn 3 & 4	Essexville	1000	Natural gas and/or oil-fired
Greenwood Energy Center	Avoca	785	Natural gas, fuel oil, tall oil, biodiesel
T.E.S. Filer City Station	Filer City	60	Coal, wood waste, petroleum coke, tire derived fuel, in 2018 being converted to 225MW natural gas only

== Municipal solid waste ==
Waste to energy plants which use garbage to produce power are a minor source of Michigan's electricity.

Plant	Location	Power (MW)	Notes
Jackson County Resource Recovery	Jackson	3.7	With natural gas
Kent County Waste To Energy	Kent	18	

=== Former plants ===
Plant	Location	Power (MW)	Notes
Detroit waste incinerator	Detroit	68	Shut down in March 2019

== Landfill gas ==
Landfill gas plants, which use methane collected from garbage dumps to power electrical generators, are in use near a number of Michigan landfills, but are only a minor source of power.

This table only includes plants larger than 4 MW.

Plant	Location	Power (MW)	Notes
Arbor Hills Landfill	Salem	28.7	Two plants
Carleton Farms Landfill	Carleton	4.0	
EDL / Brent Run Landfill	Montrose	5.6	
EDL / Citizens Disposal Landfill	Grand Blanc	7.2	Two plants
EDL / Ottawa County Farms Landfill	Coopersville	5.6	Two plants
Pine Tree Acres Landfill	New Haven	21.6	Two plants
Riverview Land Preserve	Riverview	6.6	
Southeast Berrien County Landfill	Buchanan	4.8	

=== Former plants ===
Plant	Location	Power (MW)	Notes
EDL Wood Road Landfill	Lansing	8.0	Two plants, closed September 2021

== Biomass/waste power plants ==
Biomass power plants in Michigan often use waste from the lumber industry. Smaller units use food waste, or cow, pig and turkey waste.

Plant	Location	Power (MW)	Notes
Cadillac Renewable	Cadillac	38	Wood, 38 MW Gen1 closed February 2020, Gen2 installed August 2020
Fremont Community Digester	Fremont	3	Anaerobic digestion of baby food, other food waste
Genesee Power	Genesee	36	Wood
Grayling Generating	Grayling	36	Wood
L'Anse Warden	L'Anse	20	Wood
Lincoln Power	Lincoln	16	Wood
McBain Power	McBain	16	Wood
Verso Paper	Quinnesec	28	Wood

=== Retired ===
Plant	Location	Power (MW)	Notes
Hillman Power	Hillman	18	Wood, closed May 2022

== Hydropower ==
Michigan has a number of small hydropower plants; however, the generally small, flat rivers provide a limited source of power.

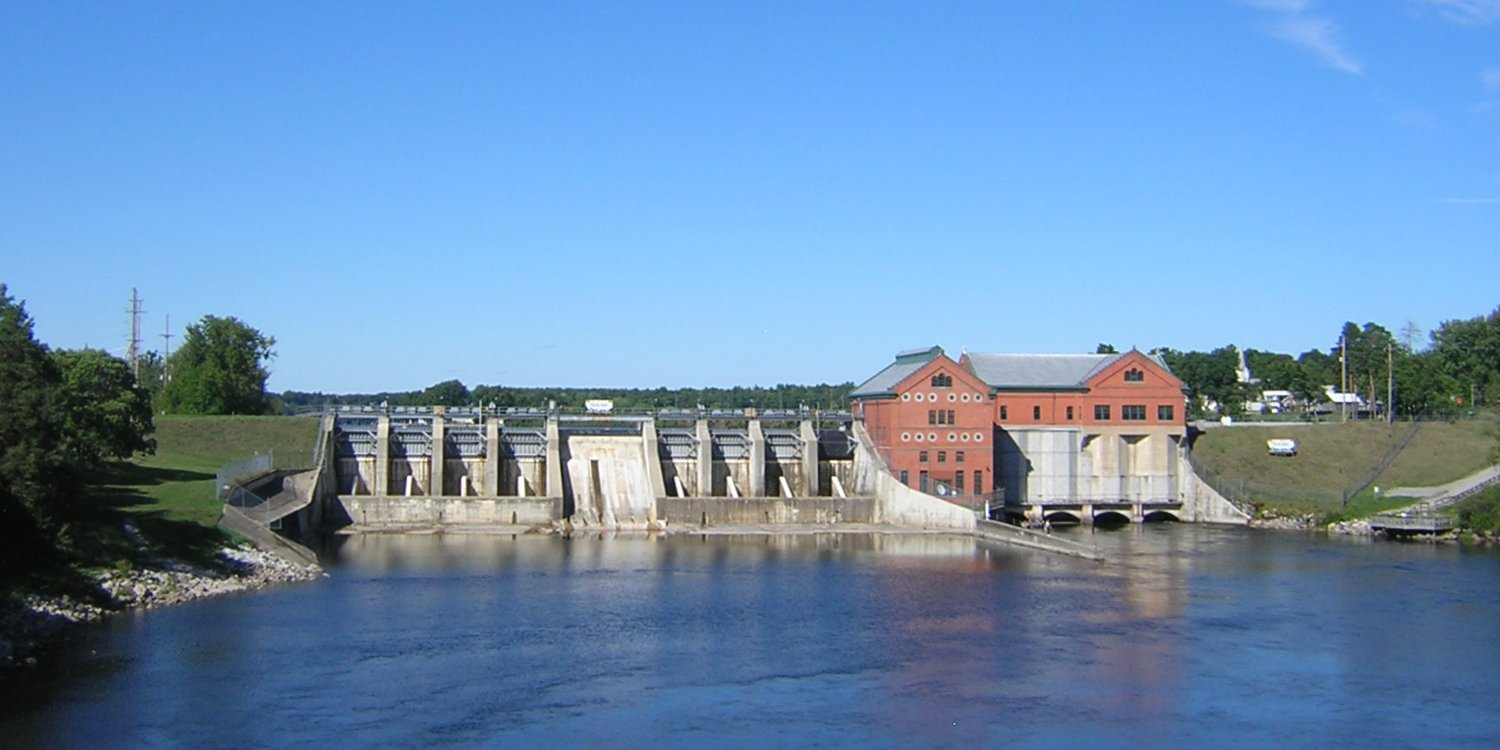
Croton Dam and powerhouse

Plant	Location	River	Power (MW)	Notes
Ada Dam Hydro Power Plant	Ada	Thornapple River	30	
Alcona Dam	Alcona County	Au Sable River (Michigan)	8	Consumers Energy
Allegan Dam Hydro Power Plant	Allegan	Kalamazoo River	3	Consumers Energy
Berrien Springs Hydro Power Plant	Berrien Springs	St. Joseph River (Lake Michigan)	7	American Electric Power
Big Quinnesec Dam	Iron Mountain	Menominee River	22	Wisconsin Energy Corporation
Boardman Hydro Power Plant		Boardman River	1	
Buchanan Hydro Power Plant	Buchanan	St. Joseph River	4	
Cascade Dam Hydro Power Plant	Caledonia	Thornapple River	2	
Cataract Hydro Power Plant		Escanaba River	2	
Chalk Hill Dam	Stephenson	Menominee River	7	Wisconsin Energy Corporation
Cheboygan Hydro Power Plant		Cheboygan River	1	
Constantine Hydro Power Plant	Constantine	St Joseph River	1	
Cooke Dam	Oscoda	Au Sable River	9	Consumers Energy
Croton Dam	Newaygo County	Muskegon River	9	Consumers Energy
Crystal Falls Dam and Power Plant	Crystal Falls	Paint River	1	
Edenville Hydro Power Plant		Tittabawassee River	5	Hydro Power LLC
Five Channels Dam	Oscoda	Au Sable River	6	Consumers Energy
Foote Dam	Oscoda	Au Sable River	9	Consumers Energy
Four Mile Hydro Power Plant	Alpena	Thunder Bay River	2	
French Landing Dam and Powerhouse	Van Buren Township	Huron River (Michigan)	2	French Landing Dam
French Paper Hydro Power Plant		St Joseph River	1	
Grand Rapids Hydro Power Plant		Menominee River	7	
Hardy Dam	Newaygo County	Muskegon River	30	Consumers Energy
Hemlock Falls Power Plant	Crystal Falls	Michigamme River	3	Wisconsin Energy Corporation
Hodenpyl Hydro Power Plant	Mesick	Manistee River	17	Consumers Energy
Hoist Hydro Power Plant	Marquette	Dead River	4	
Kingsford Power Plant	Kingsford	Menominee River	6	Wisconsin Energy Corporation
Loud Dam	Oscoda County	Au Sable River	4	Consumers Energy
McClure Hydro Power Plant		Dead River	8	
Menominee Mill Marinette Hydro Power Plant		Menominee River	2	
Michigamme Falls Power Plant	Crystal Falls	Michigamme River	9	Wisconsin Energy Corporation
Mio Dam	Mio	Au Sable River	5	Consumers Energy
Mottville Hydro Power Plant	Mottville	St. Joseph River	2	
Ninth Street Hydro Power Plant	Alpena	Thunder Bay River	1	
Norway Hydro Power Plant		Menominee River	6	
Norway Point Hydro Power Plant	Alpena	Thunder Bay River	4	
Peavy Falls Power Plant	Crystal Falls	Michigamme River	15	Wisconsin Energy Corporation
Prickett Hydro Power Plant	Prickett Lake	Sturgeon River (Michigan)	2	
Rogers Hydro Power Plant	Mecosta County	Muskegon River	7	Consumers Energy
St Louis Hydro Power Plant	St. Louis	Pine River (Chippewa River)	7	
Saint Marys Falls Hydropower Plant	Sault Ste. Marie	St. Marys River	18	United States Army Corps of Engineers
Saxon Falls Hydro Power Plant	Saxon	Montreal River	1	
Sturgis Hydro Power Plant	Centreville	St. Joseph River	2	City of Sturgis
Superior Falls Hydro Power Plant		Montreal River	1	XcelEnergy, closing 2024
Tippy Dam	Manistee	Manistee River	20	Consumers Energy
Twin Falls Power Plant	Iron Mountain	Menominee River	6	Wisconsin Energy Corporation
Victoria Hydro Power Plant	Ontonagon	Ontonagon River	12	
Way Dam and Michigamme Reservoir	Crystal Falls	Paint River	2	Wisconsin Energy Corporation
Webber Hydro Power Plant	Ionia	Grand River (Michigan)	4	Consumers Energy
White Rapids Power Plant	Stephenson	Menonminee River River	7	Wisconsin Energy Corporation

=== Retired ===
Plant	Location	River	Power (MW)	Notes
Sanford Hydro Power Plant	Sanford	Tittabawassee River	4	Hydro Power LLC, closed May 2020
Secord Hydro Power Plant		Tittabawassee River	1	Hydro Power LLC, closed May 2020
Smallwood Hydro Power Plant		Tittabawassee River	1	Hydro Power LLC, closed May 2020

== Pumped storage hydropower power stations ==
Michigan has one pumped-storage hydroelectricity station, on the shore of Lake Michigan, used for power balancing. It is the fifth largest such plant in the world.

Plant	Location	Power (MW)	Notes
Ludington Pumped Storage Power Plant	Ludington	2172	

== Wind power stations ==
Wind power in Michigan has grown rapidly due to national price supports and a Michigan mandate to produce 10% renewable energy by 2015. The largest concentration of wind power is in the Thumb region.

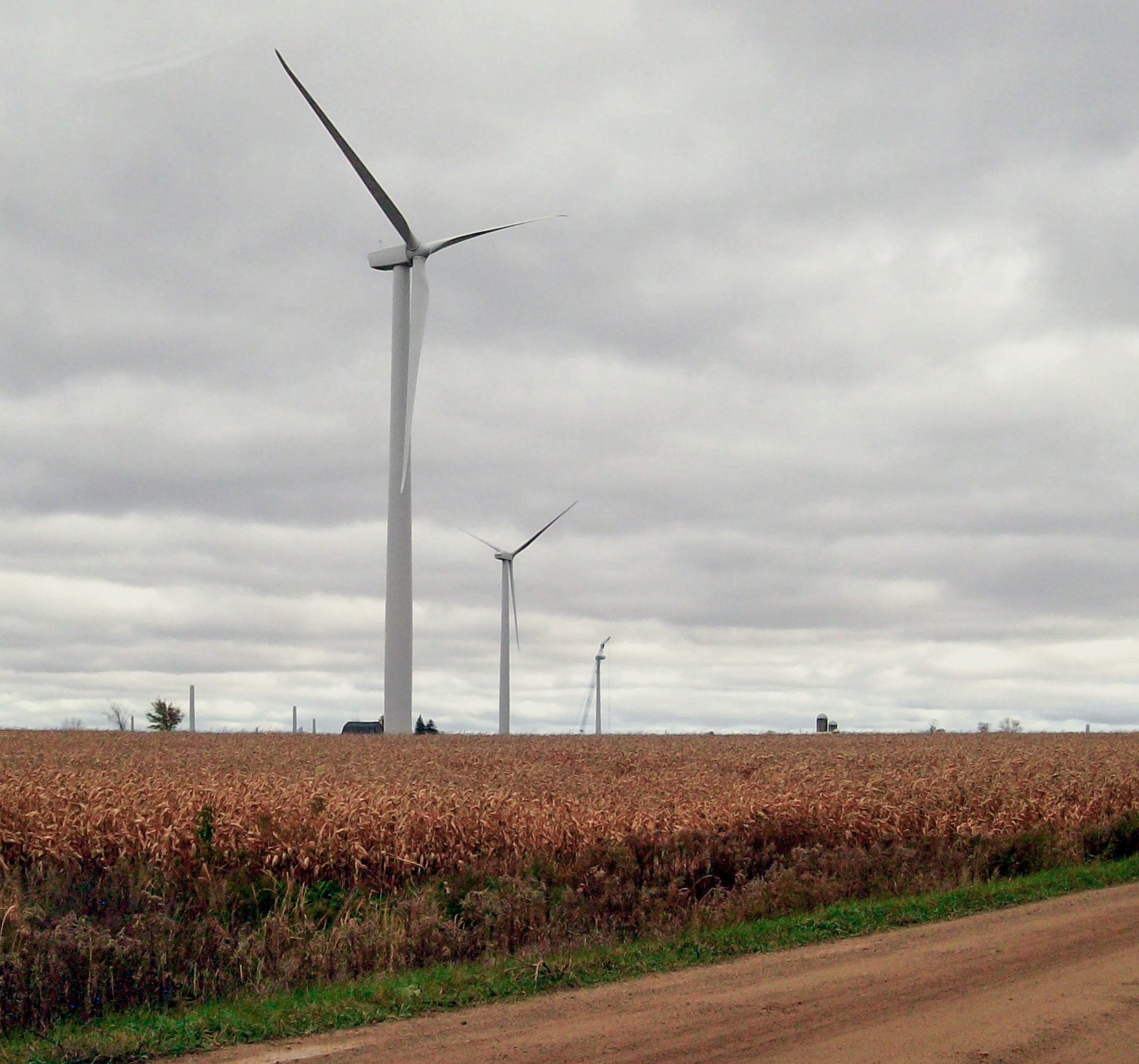
Michigan Wind 1 wind farm near Ubly

As of February 2024

Name	Size (MW)	Location
Apple Blossom Wind Farm	100	Huron County
Beebe 1B Wind Farm	50.4	Gratiot County
Beebe Wind Farm	81.6	Gratiot County
Big Turtle Wind Farm	50	Huron County
Brookfield Wind Farm	75	Huron County
Crescent Wind	166	Hillsdale County
Cross Winds	111	Tuscola County
Cross Winds II	44	Tuscola County
Cross Winds III	76	Tuscola County
Deerfield Wind Farm	261	Huron County
DTE/Invenergy Gratiot County Wind Project	213	Gratiot County
Echo Wind Park	120	Huron County
Fairbanks Wind Farm	72	Delta County
Garden Wind Farm	28	Garden Township, Delta County
Gratiot Farms Wind	150	Gratiot County
Harvest Wind Farm I	53	Huron County
Harvest Wind Farm II	59	Huron County
Heartland Wind	200	Gratiot County
Isabella Wind	385	Isabella County
Lake Winds Energy Park	100.8	Mason County
Mackinaw City	1.8	Mackinaw City
McKinley	14	Huron County
Meridian	225	Saginaw and Midland Counties
Michigan Wind 1	69	Ubly
Michigan Wind 2	90	Minden City
Minden	32	Sanilac
Pegasus	130	Tuscola
Pheasant Run Wind I	75	Huron County
Pine River	161	Gratiot, Isabella Counties
Pinnebog Wind Park	50	Huron County
Polaris Wind Park	168	Gratiot County
Sigel	64	Huron County
Stoney Corners	60	McBain, Michigan
Tuscola Bay	120	Tuscola, Bay, Saginaw counties
Tuscola II	100	Tuscola, Bay counties

== Solar power stations ==
Solar power is a very minor source of electricity in Michigan.

Systems of over 5.0 MW, as of April 2024

Solar farms in Michigan with over 5 MW of capacity
Name	Location	Size (MW)	Notes
Assembly Solar Farm	Shiwassee County	346.9	239 MW_{(AC)}, completed March 2022
Bingham Solar	Clinton County	20.0	
Blue Elk III Solar	Eaton Rapids	20.0	
Blue Elk III Solar	Genesee	20.0	
Blue Elk IV Solar	Adrian	20.0	
Byrne Solar Farm	Detroit	5.0	
Calhoun Solar	Calhoun County	260.0	200 MWac, 2023
Cement City Solar	Cement City	20.0	
Cereal City Solar	Battle Creek	100.0	
Delta Solar I and II	Eaton County	24.0	Lansing Board of Water & Light
DeMille Solar Farm	Lapeer County	28.4	DTE
Electric City Solar	Sturgis	15.0	
Greenstone Solar	Coldwater	20.0	
Letts Creek Solar	Grass Lake	15.0	
Lyons Road Solar	Shiawassee County	26.8	20.0 MW _{(AC)}
MacBeth Solar	Muskegon County	26.8	20.0 MW _{(AC)}
Midcontinent Solar	Owosso	20.0	
Pickford Solar	Pickford	6.9	Cloverland Electric Coop / Heritage Sustainable Energy
Pullman Solar	Allegan County	20.0	
Spartan PV 1	East Lansing	10.5	Michigan State University carports
Temperance Solar	Monroe County	20.0	
Turrill Solar Farm	Lapeer County	19.6	DTE
