= ITC Transmission =

American electricity transmission company

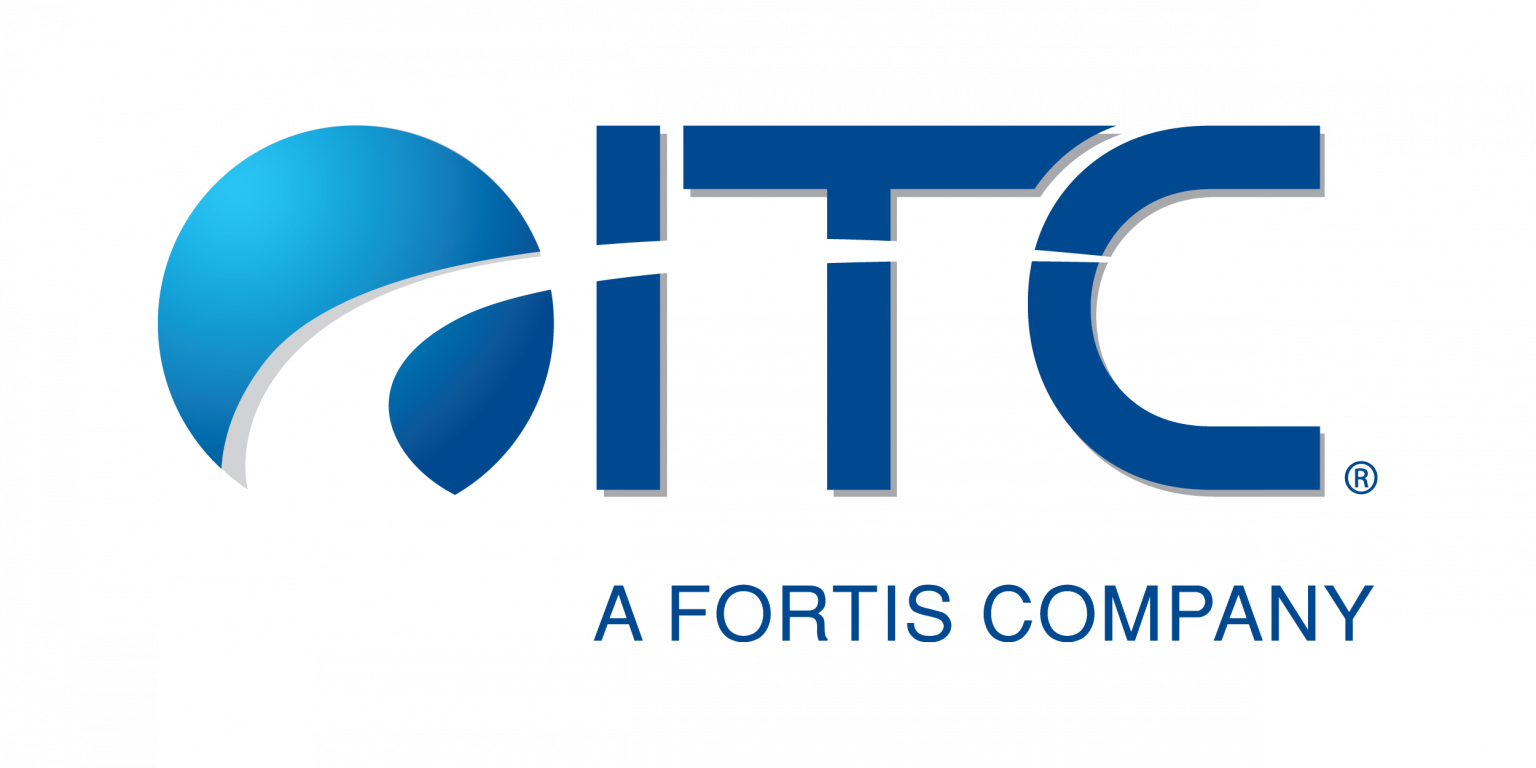

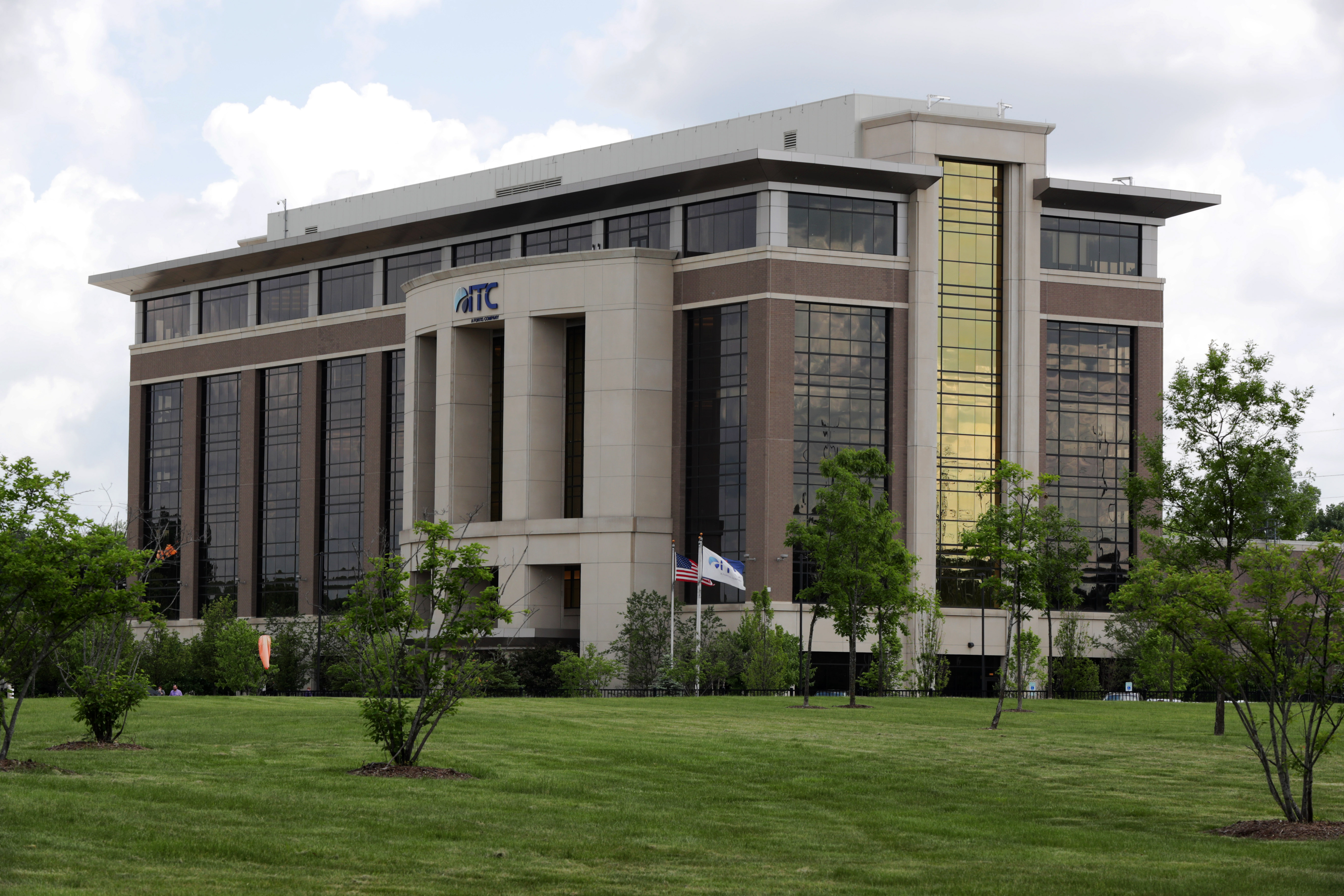
- Headquarters in Novi, Michigan
- Type: Subsidiary
- Industry: Electric utilities
- Headquarters: Novi, Michigan, United States
- Owner: DTE Energy (1999–2003); Fortis (2016–present)
- Number of employees: 700 (2023)
- Website: www.itc-holdings.com

ITC Holdings Corporation (doing business as ITC Transmission) is an American energy company which owns and operates high-voltage electricity transmission networks. Headquartered in Novi, Michigan, ITC has operations in Michigan, Illinois, Iowa, Kansas, Minnesota, Missouri, Oklahoma, and Wisconsin. The company is a wholly owned subsidiary of Canadian energy company Fortis Inc.

== History ==
ITC was founded in 1999 as International Transmission Co., a subsidiary of Detroit Edison (since renamed DTE Energy Electric Company, itself a subsidiary of DTE Energy), charged in the ownership, operation and maintenance of Detroit Edison's transmission system. In 2003, DTE sold the subsidiary to ITC Holdings Corp., making it the first fully independent electricity transmission company in the United States. ITC Holdings Corp. (NYSE: ITC) became a publicly traded company in 2005, and began construction of its Novi headquarters in 2006. Today it owns transmission systems in several states under a unique independent business model.

On February 9, 2016, it was announced that Fortis Inc., a Canadian utility company based in St. John's, Newfoundland and Labrador, will buy ITC Holdings for about $6.9 billion. The utility operator will also assume $4.4 billion in debt in cash and stock deal. Fortis said it intends to retain all ITC employees and that ITC will continue as a stand-alone operation at its Novi headquarters.

In November 2025, ITC Announced the retirement of CEO Linda Apsey and the appointment of Krista Tanner as her successor, effective March 23, 2026.

== System ==
=== ITC Michigan ===
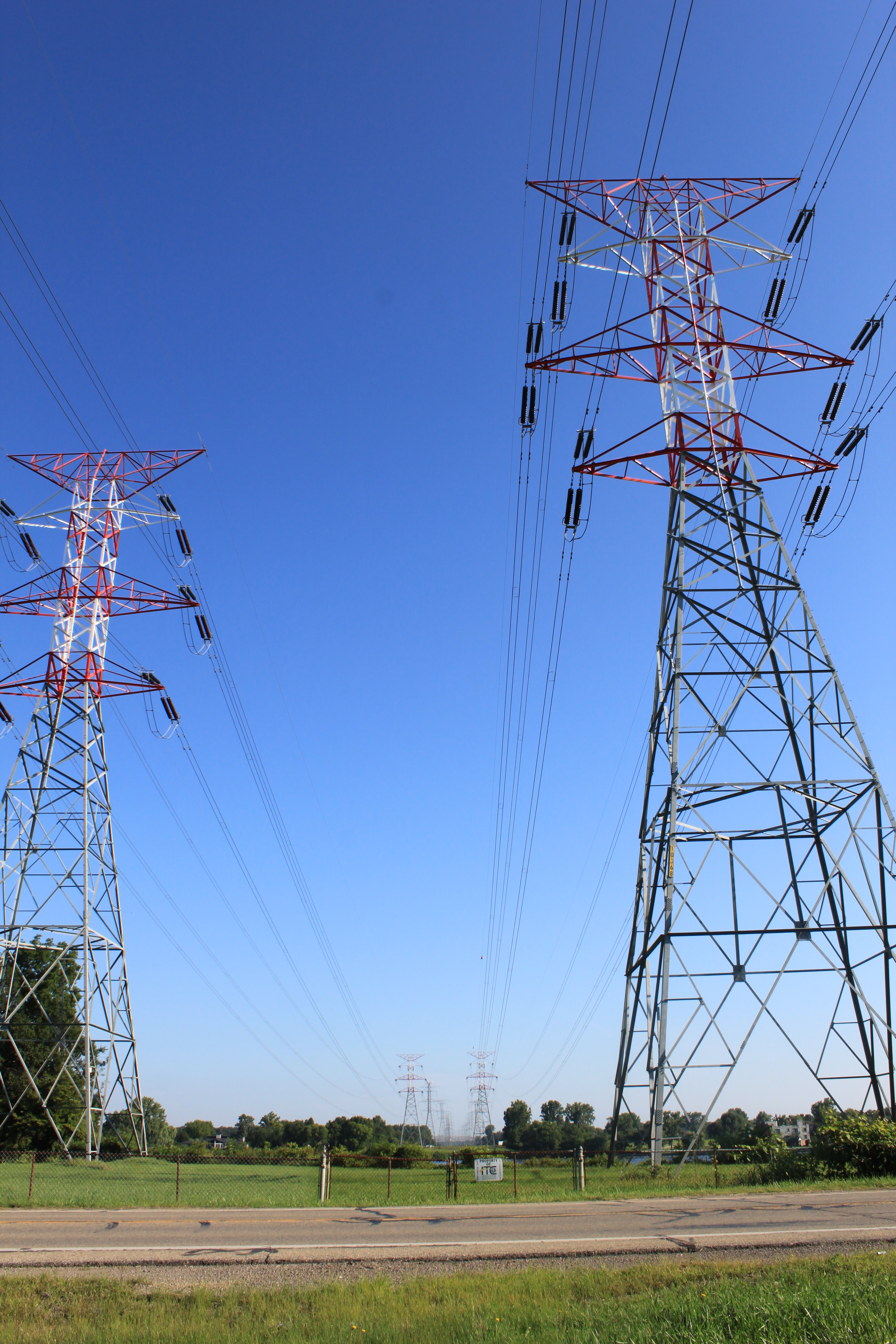
ITC power lines in Van Buren Township, Michigan

The ITC Michigan system, covering much of Michigan's Lower Peninsula, is composed of transmission systems formerly owned by Consumers Energy and Detroit Edison.

==== The original ITC Transmission system ====
The original ITC Transmission system serves areas of southeastern Michigan and the Thumb region served by DTE Electric.

Largely overlapping DTE Electric's area, and launched on March 1, 2003, ITC's transmission line voltages are 345,000 volts, 230,000 volts, 138,000 volts, and 120,000 volts.

ITC has three 345 kV interconnections with First Energy Corporation in Ohio, via that company's Toledo Edison subsidiary (Bayshore-Monroe line, Majestic-Monroe-Allen Junction line, and the Majestic-Lemoyne line). Though owned by ITC these lines reside on towers designed and previously owned by Consumers, as they pass through part of their service area in southern Monroe and southeastern Lenawee Counties.

There are four interconnections with Hydro One in Ontario, Canada—one 345kV (St. Clair-Lambton #1) and three 230kV (Keith-Waterman line, St. Clair-Lambton #2 line and the Bunce Creek-Scott line).

In the early 2010s, ITC Transmission added a new 345 kV line, the "Michigan Thumb Loop", to strengthen the transmission grid in the Thumb Region to serve as a backbone for the interconnection of new generation sources in the area, including wind farms. This project was built with steel tubular pylons in a double-circuit arrangement. This was completed in 2015.

ITC Transmission has 2,800 circuit miles of transmission lines, with 17,700 transmission pylons, and 171 stations and substations. The system has 230 kV lines that cover the Metro Detroit area including Shelby Township in Macomb County where two meet at the Jewell Substation. The recognizable transmission line in the area is the so-called "Edison Corridor": two double-circuit 345 kV lines (portions of it became single circuit) and two 120 kV lines with one heading toward the northeast starting from the Bismark Substation to the Lenox Substation. This corridor extends 20 miles (32 km) through Warren from the Stephens Substation and through Sterling Heights and Utica, and finally Shelby and Washington Townships. ITC Transmission has spent approximately $1.2 billion in capital investments in rebuilding electric infrastructure in the metro-Detroit area since 2003. According to the 2012 SGS Statistical Services Transmission Reliability Benchmark Study, ITC Transmission was also ranked in the top 10% of electric utilities in terms of operational performance based on sustained outage performance data.

==== Michigan Electric Transmission Company (METC) ====
In October 2006, ITC Holdings Corp. completed the acquisition of METC, or Michigan Electric Transmission Company. Largely overlapping Consumers Energy's area, METC system uses line voltages of 345,000, 230,000 and 138,000 volts. Consumers retained its radial 138 kV lines. METC installed a line that is designed for 230kv running from Traverse City northeast to Kalkaska, Michigan particularly made of steel poles with three insulators or conductors, known as the Keystone to Clearwater Line. Though the line was constructed for 230 kV operation, it remains operating at 138 kV until further upgrades are completed.

METC has four 345 kV interconnections with American Electric Power, via AEP's Indiana Michigan Power division: Palisades-Cook #1, Palisades-Cook #2, Argenta-Robinson Park and Argenta-Twin Branch.

METC has six other 138kV interconnections with other utilities: one 138kV interconnection each with Northern Indiana Public Service Company (Barton-Batavia line) and Alpena Power Company; two with the Cloverland Electric Cooperative (on former Edison Sault Electric Company facilities) in the eastern part of Michigan's Upper Peninsula (McGulpin-Straits #1 and McGulpin-Straits #2; these lines are submerged under the Straits of Mackinac); and two 138 kV interconnections with the Lansing Board of Water & Light (Davis-Oneida line and the Davis-Enterprise line). METC also completed capital projects including the 138 kV rebuild project near East Tawas, and the 138 kV Oakland-Tihart line.

METC includes 5,600 circuit miles of transmission lines, with 36,900 transmission towers and poles and 98 stations and substations across the majority of Michigan’s lower peninsula. According to the 2012 SGS Statistical Services Transmission Reliability Benchmark Study, METC was ranked among the top 10% of electric utilities in terms of operational performance based on sustained outage performance data.

==== Interconnections between ITC Transmission and METC ====
There are four 345 kV interconnections between the ITC and METC systems to the west of DTE Electric's service area (Majestic-Tompkins line, Majestic-Battle Creek-Oneida line, Jewell-Thetford line, and the Pontiac-Hampton line), plus five 120/138 kV interconnections (the Custer-Whiting line, Genoa-Latson line, Hemphill-Hunters Creek line, Washtenaw-Lark-Blackstone line and the Atlanta-Thetford-Karn line). In addition, the Michigan Thumb Loop line that runs within the DTE service area will interconnect with Consumers / METC's Pontiac-Hampton line at the new Bauer Substation in Tuscola County, northeast of Frankenmuth.

Another major interconnection point between the ITC and METC systems is the Morocco Substation in Deerfield Township in Lenawee County, near the county line with Monroe County. The substation serves to connect the two 138kv Beecher-Whiting circuits that run between Adrian and Consumers' J. R. Whiting Generating Complex on Lake Erie with the 345kv Majestic-Lemoyne line. This is designed to relieve stress on the transmission system after the anticipated closure of the Whiting plant in 2016.

=== ITC Midwest ===
ITC Midwest LLC has transmission systems in portions of Iowa, Minnesota, Illinois and Missouri. This subsidiary was created on December 20, 2007 with ITC's acquisition of Interstate Power and Light Company's transmission system. ITC Midwest owns and operates 6,600 circuit miles of transmission lines with 262 stations and substations. Since 2008, ITC Midwest has completed 16 new generator interconnects, adding approximately 2,137 megawatts of wind energy production capacity to the grid. This additional amount is more than the total installed wind capacity that existed in Iowa in 2007.

=== ITC Great Plains ===
ITC Great Plains, a transmission-only utility, is a subsidiary of ITC Grid Development, LLC, which in turn is wholly owned by ITC Holdings Corp. ITC Great Plains became an independent transmission company member of the Southwest Power Pool (SPP) in September 2006. It is the only ITC Holdings operating company with a "greenfield" business model that is not predicated on acquiring other companies’ systems. ITC Great Plains has current operations in Kansas and Oklahoma.

ITC Great Plains owns approximately 190 miles of transmission lines, with approximately 1,168 transmission towers and poles and 5 stations and substations.

=== ITC Grid Development ===
Established in 2006, ITC Grid Development was created to explore new investment opportunities in the nation's transmission grid. This subsidiary is focused on partnering with local entities and utilities to improve electric reliability through infrastructure improvements and a creation of a regional transmission grid.

=== Private Fiber Network ===
As of 2019, ITC Holdings plans to build its own "private fiber network" which will be stringed on its electricity transmission lines. Additionally, the company has a $4 billion capital investment plan for the next five years. The plan will focus on reliability improvements and average $700–800 million per year.
