= Midland Cogeneration Venture =

Natural gas power plant in Midland, Michigan

Midland Cogeneration Venture (MCV)
- Country: United States
- Location: Midland, Michigan
- Coordinates: 43°35′10″N 84°13′19″W
- Status: Operational
- Commission date: 1991
- Owner: Midland Cogeneration Venture Limited Partnership

Thermal power station
- Primary fuel: Natural gas
- Cogeneration?: Yes

Power generation
- Nameplate capacity: 1,560 MW

The Midland Cogeneration Venture (MCV) is a natural gas-fired electrical and steam co-generation plant in Midland, Michigan owned by Midland Cogeneration Venture Limited Partnership. When it began operation in 1991, it was the largest gas-fired steam recovery power plant in the world.

Originally designed as the Midland Nuclear Power Plant, the initial design called for two Babcock & Wilcox pressurized water reactors. Reactor one was designed with a 460 MWe rating, and reactor two with an 808 MWe rating. The design called for once-through steam generators (OTSGs) similar to those at Oconee. Consumers Power abandoned the project, which was 85% complete, in 1984 citing numerous construction problems, most notably a sinking foundation. These problems included sinking and cracking of some buildings on the site due to poor soil compaction prior to construction, as well as shifting regulatory requirements following the 1979 accident at Three Mile Island. The poor soil preparation was then exacerbated when the 880 acre cooling pond was filled to its approximate average depth of 15 feet. This in turn, seemed to raise the water table in and around the site. Construction was also opposed by environmentalists, led by Midland resident, Mary P. Sinclair.

By then, 17 years and US$4.3 billion had been invested in the project. Consumers Power, nearly bankrupted by the project, formed a holding company, CMS Energy for it to be a subsidiary of and eventually changed its name to Consumers Energy.

Through the Michigan Public Service Commission, Michigan Attorney General Frank J. Kelley fought Consumers Power's Midland, Michigan nuclear power plant as it drowned in cost overruns in the 1980s. The court battle scuttled the utility’s plans to complete the plant and pass the costs on to rate paying consumers.

Conversion of the plant began in 1986 and was completed at a cost of $500 million, almost twice the original estimate of the nuclear facility. First electrical production occurred in 1990. The plant produces 1,560 Megawatts of electricity for Consumers and 1.35 million pounds per hour of industrial steam for Dow Chemical. The electrical capacity is approximately 10% of the power consumption for the lower peninsula of Michigan. Over time the plant capacity was further up-rated to 1,633 Megawatts and 1.5 million pounds per hour steam.

In July 2002, an unused nuclear reactor vessel head from Unit 2 was removed from its containment building for transportation to Davis-Besse Nuclear Power Station near Oak Harbor, Ohio, where it replaced a damaged vessel head on a reactor.

Consumers owned a 49 percent share in MCV until 2006. Eight other companies owned the remaining 51 percent. In mid-December 2012 Midland Cogeneration Venture was purchased by Borealis Infrastructure. In 2013 the Global Strategic Investment Alliance (GSIA) became a 33% investor. In 2017, Borealis Infrastructure was renamed OMERS Infrastructure Management Inc. Peter (Pete) Milojevic, MCV President and CEO since August 2013, has indicated the company is ready to further expand the electricity capacity of the facility by approximately 800 Megawatts to help replace permanent shutdowns of other generating facilities in the state of Michigan. This would increase MCV's total electricity capacity to about 2,400 Megawatts.

== See also ==
- List of power stations in Michigan
