= St. Clair Power Plant =

Power generation facility

Saint Clair Power Plant
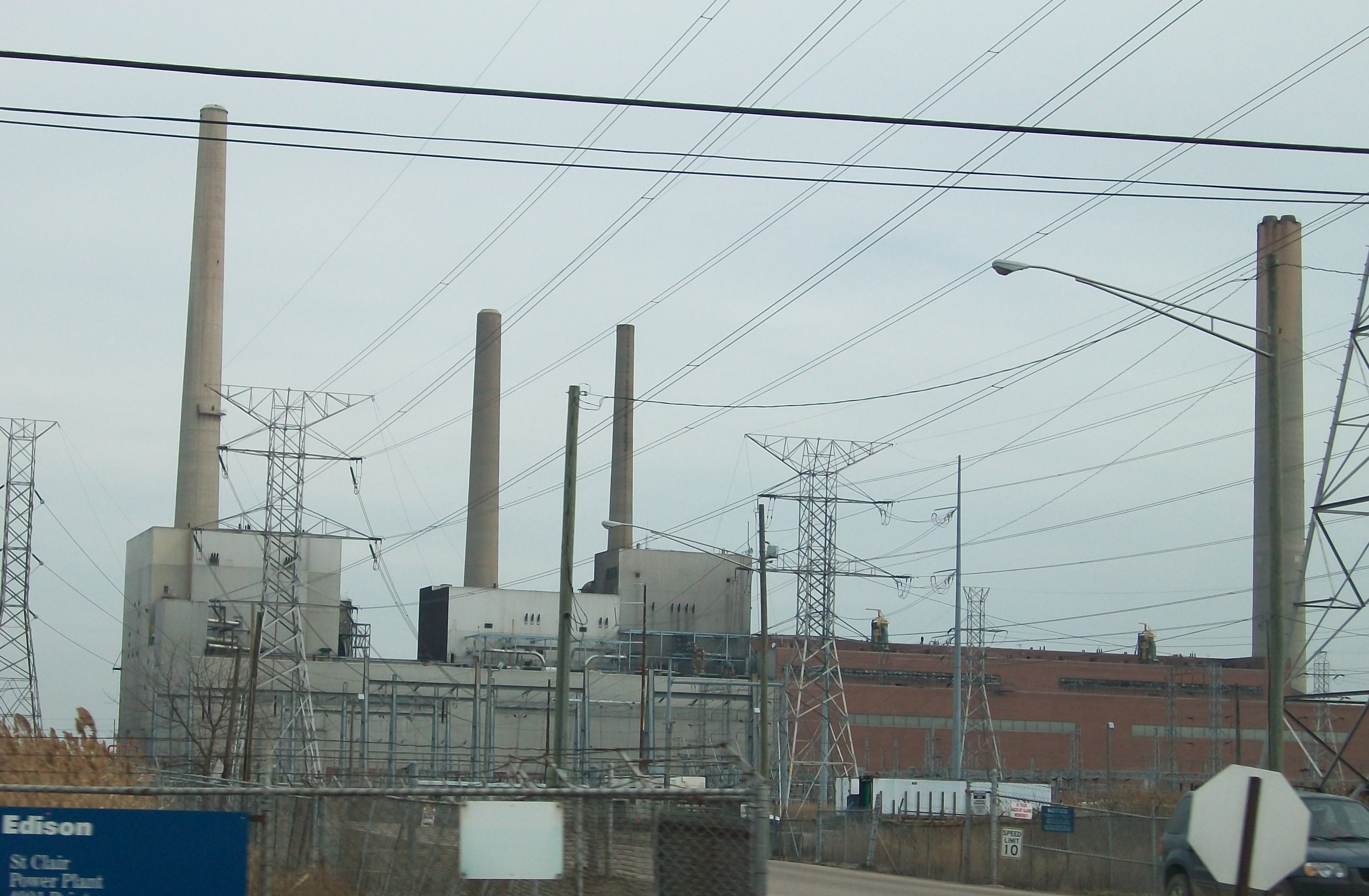
- Detroit Edison's St. Clair Power Plant.
- Country: United States
- Location: East China, St. Clair County, Michigan
- Coordinates: 42°45′52″N 82°28′21″W
- Status: Decommissioned
- Commission date: Unit 1: August, 1953; Unit 2: November, 1953; Unit 3: June, 1954; Unit 4: October, 1954; Unit 6: April, 1961; Unit 7: April, 1969; Oil turbine: May, 1968; 2 internal combustion generators: December, 1970
- Decommission date: Unit 5: 1979 Unit 4: 2017 Unit 1: 2019 Units 2, 3, 6, 7: May 2022
- Owner: Detroit Edison

Thermal power station
- Primary fuel: Subbituminous coal, distillate fuel oil
- Cooling source: St. Clair River

Power generation
- Units operational: 6
- Nameplate capacity: 1,928 MWe
- At one time, St. Clair Power Plant was the world's largest.

The Saint Clair Power Plant was a major coal- and oil-fired power plant owned by DTE Electric, a subsidiary of DTE Energy. It was located in St. Clair County, Michigan, on the west bank of St. Clair River. The plant was across M-29 from the newer Belle River Power Plant in East China, Michigan. The first four units of St. Clair were built in 1953–1954. Since then, three more generating units were added to the plant. The St. Clair Power Plant generated 1982 megawatts in total. It was Detroit Edison's second largest power producer. The power plant has a large impact on the local economy, employing about 300 workers. The plant shut down in May 2022.

== Units ==
A total of seven coal-fired boilers were ultimately built at St. Clair, although only six remain operational.

=== Units 1 – 4 ===
Units 1 – 4 are 163 MW Babcock & Wilcox boilers tied to GE and Allis-Chalmers steam turbines. These are the four original units at St. Clair. Generating units 1–4 are St. Clair's base load units, usually running at full capacity. The flue gases from those units exit through south stack, which was erected in the late 1970s when new electrostatic precipitators were added to these units. When the plant was first built, there were four relatively short stacks, one for each unit. St. Clair Unit 4 retired early, in 2017, due to mechanical problems and Unit 1 was retired in March 2019.

=== Unit 5 ===
Unit 5 is St. Clair's first decommissioned unit. Its cyclone boiler produced 300 MW, and was taken out of service in 1979 due to a mechanical problem with the boiler. The stack for unit five was removed in 2012.

=== Unit 6 ===
Unit 6 is a tangentially fired Combustion Engineering dual furnace boiler tied to a Westinghouse turbine. Commissioned in 1961, this unit produces 321 MW.

=== Unit 7 ===
Unit 7 is also a tangentially fired Combustion Engineering boiler tied to a Westinghouse steam turbine. It was commissioned in 1969. Unit 7 is rated at 451 MW, originally built to produce over 500 MW. This unit is St. Clair's largest generating unit, but has a small electrostatic precipitator, causing problems with the opacity when burning western coal.

=== Other units ===
An oil-fueled gas turbine Unit 11, rated at 18.5 MWe, was added in 1968. Two smaller oil-fueled internal-combustion generators, totaling 5.4 MWe, were added as units 12A and 12B in 1970.

== History ==
St. Clair Power Plant came online in August 1953, and was the largest in the DTE Energy network. At that time, its capacity was 652 MW. Later, units 5, 6 and 7 were added to meet growing demands for power in Metro Detroit, with St. Clair producing 1571 MW. After the completion of unit 7 in 1969, St. Clair Power Plant was the world's largest. In the middle to late 1970s, the plant was converted to burn Western subbituminous coal. The conversion resulted in lower unit power ratings and necessitated the installation of larger electrostatic precipitators on Units 1–4 and Unit 6. This also included building a new stack for units 1–4. In addition, low NOx burners and overfire air ports have been installed on all of St. Clair's generating units.

On August 11, 2016, at around 6:30 pm local time, a generation unit at St. Clair Power Plant caught fire. This led to a complete shutdown of all units at the plant. No injuries were reported as a result of the fire. The fire took 15 hours to extinguish. Fire equipment was borrowed from across St. Clair County, from Detroit and nearby Canadian fire departments.

DTE plans to retire the plant in 2022 following the commissioning of the new Blue Water Energy Center.

== Coal sources ==
=== Coal blend used ===
St. Clair burns a blend of low-sulfur Western coal (from the Decker (Powder River Basin) and Spring Creek mines in Montana) and high-sulfur Pittsburgh-seam Eastern coal. Blending is done in the coal yard with variable speed feeders. Although the nominal blend is 85% Western and 15% Eastern coal, the exact blend depends on a number of factors including demand requirements, coal prices, stockpile inventory, and unit availability. In the summer months, for example, the blend trends toward 70/30 on Units 6 and 7 to gain additional generating capacity by firing more Eastern coal with its higher heating value. The higher sulfur content of the Eastern coal also helps prevent opacity excursions with the electrostatic precipitator on Unit 7.

=== Transportation and stockpiling ===
The Western coal is delivered to Superior, Wisconsin, by unit train and then barged to St. Clair on 60,000-ton ships. Because the ships typically cannot operate on the Great Lakes from late December until late March, the plant must stockpile between 2.1 and 2.4 million tons for the winter season. Eastern coal is delivered by rail to an unloading facility. Because of decline in production, the plant's seasonal stockpiling of Eastern coal declined from 140,000 tons to 20,000–30,000 tons in 2004.

== Operational data ==
St. Clair is a base load power plant, dispatched after DTE Energy's Fermi 2 nuclear unit and the neighboring Belle River coal-fired power plant. Between 1999 and 2003, St. Clair's capacity factor averaged 57%, plant heat rate averaged 10,449 British thermal units per kilowatt-hour (3.1 kWh/kWh), giving a plant efficiency of 32%, and the equivalent forced outage rate averaged 18%.

== Connections to power grid ==
The plant is connected to the power grid by 2 double circuit 345,000 and 5 120,000 volt transmission lines, owned and operated by ITC Transmission. The St. Clair has one 345 kV line (St. Clair-Lambton #1) and one 230 kV line (St. Clair-Lambton #2) that interconnect with Hydro One across the St. Clair River in Ontario, Canada. One of the wires of a 345 kV line enters a substation at the Belle River Power Plant.

== Environmental impact ==
The St. Clair and Belle River Complex, along with the rest of Detroit Edison's generating facilities are ISO 14001 certified.

=== Sulfur dioxide ===
With its oldest unit dating back to the 1950s, the plant was ranked 74th on the United States list of dirtiest power plants in terms of sulfur dioxide emissions per megawatt-hour of electrical energy produced in 2006. Sulfur emissions could be lowered by using flue-gas desulfurization units, better known as SO_{2} "scrubbers", like those of Lambton Generating Station across the St. Clair River. Currently, these scrubbers are being installed at DTE's Monroe Power Plant, and may eventually be added at the St. Clair site as well.

=== Waste water ===
All of the waste heat generated by the plant (about twice its electrical output) is released into the St. Clair River. This water is used in large condensers to cool the used steam back to its liquid form. Water used in the condensers is treated, filtered, and replaced back into the river. Other water used on site for cleaning boilers and to drive the turbines is treated in settling ponds where ash and particulate are suspended from the water. The water is purified and pumped back to the river. The particulate is taken to the St. Clair/Belle River ash landfill a few miles north.

== See also ==
- List of power stations in Michigan
