= Belle River Power Plant =

Power plant in East China, Michigan, U.S.

- Country: United States
- Location: East China, Michigan
- Coordinates: 42°46′26″N 82°29′42″W
- Status: Operational
- Commission date: 5 internal combustion generators: November, 1981; Unit 1 (coal): August, 1984; Unit 2 (coal): July, 1985; 3 gas-fired turbines: September, 1999
- Owner: Detroit Edison

Thermal power station
- Primary fuel: Subbituminous coal, natural gas, distillate fuel oil
- Turbine technology: steam, gas turbine, internal combustion
- Cooling source: St. Clair River

Power generation
- Units operational: 3
- Nameplate capacity: 1,664 MWe

Belle River Power Plant is a major coal-and-natural gas-fired power plant owned by Detroit Edison, a subsidiary of DTE Energy. It is located in St. Clair County, Michigan, on the peninsula formed by the St. Clair and Belle rivers. The plant was built across M-29 from the St. Clair Power Plant in East China, Michigan, and shares the coal delivery terminal with it. The Belle River plant also shares cooling water from the St. Clair River with its sister plant. Five oil-fueled internal combustion generators (named IC1, IC2, 3, 4, and 5) were built in 1981, with a total output 13.75 megawatts. Coal-fired unit 1 of the Belle River plant was completed in 1984, followed by a similar unit 2 in 1985. Each unit has a nameplate capacity of 697.5 MWe, however the coal-fired plant as a whole generates 1260 MWe all year around. In 1999, three peaker natural-gas fired turbines (named 12-1, 12-2, and 13-1) were added, with a total name-plate capacity of 256 MWe.

Belle River is Detroit Edison's third largest producer of electricity. The power plant has a significant impact on the local economy, employing many residents. The Lansing Board of Water and Light owns a small portion of the power plant and buys electricity from DTE during peak demand periods.

The plant will be fully converted to natural gas by 2026.

== Connection to the grid ==
The plant is connected to the power grid via numerous 345 kV transmission lines, both operated and maintained by ITC Transmission. There are 3 double-circuit 345kV Transmission Lines. Two of the three head west and one goes north to west and there it crosses Interstate 94 and goes north to west again where it connects to a 345kV line heading north to the Greenwood Energy Center, also owned by Detroit Edison. Another 345 kV transmission line interconnects with Hydro One.

== Environmental impact ==
All of the waste heat generated by the plant (about twice its electrical output) is released into the St. Clair River.

== See also ==
- List of power stations in Michigan
