= Lansing Board of Water & Light =

- Industry: Public utility
- Founded: 1885
- Headquarters: Lansing, Michigan, U.S.
- Key people: Dick Peffley, General Manager
- Products: Electricity (510 megawatts), Water, Steam, Chilled Water
- Revenue: $348,122,943 (FY 2014)
- Operating income: $41,304,739 (FY 2014)
- Net income: $2,792,527 (FY 2014)
- Total assets: $1,172,041,452.87 (FY 2014)
- Total equity: $2,792,529.72 (FY 2014)
- Website: www.lbwl.com

The Lansing Board of Water & Light is a publicly owned, municipal utility that provides electricity and water to the residents of the cities of Lansing and East Lansing, Michigan, and the surrounding townships of Delta, Delhi, Meridian and DeWitt. The Lansing Board of Water & Light also provides steam and chilled water services within the City of Lansing.

== History ==
The Lansing Board of Water & Light is a municipal utility, owned by the citizens of Lansing, Michigan. The utility's roots go back to 1885, when Lansing citizens approved a $100,000 bond issue to build a water system to provide for drinking water and fire protection. Electricity was added to its list of utility services in 1892, and steam heat in 1919.

== Governance ==
The utility is governed by a board of commissioners which includes 8 voting members appointed by the mayor with consent of the city council: 1 from each of the city's 4 municipal wards, and 4 for the city at-large. Since 2014, the board also includes an additional 3 non-voting advisory members from the city of East Lansing, and the townships of Delta and Meridian to represent parts of the utility's service area outside the city of Lansing.

== System Information ==
The Lansing Board of Water & Light has an electric generating capacity of 510 megawatts. The BWL's transmission line voltage is 138,000 volts. The BWL's distribution voltages are 13,200/7,620Y, 8,320/4,800Y and 4,160/2,400Y.

The Lansing Board of Water & Light pumps an average of approximately 24 million gallons per day (MGD) from two conditioning plants through approximately 775 miles (1,247 km) of water main. Maximum daily demand is on the order of 33 MGD, while the maximum hourly demand rate can be on the order of 42 MGD. Raw water is obtained exclusively by pumping from 124 wells located throughout the Lansing area. In 2024, The Lansing Board of Water & Light began construction of a 100 foot tall, 2.5 million gallon water tower in Lansing Township, which became operational in June 2026. Prior to the construction of the water tower, the BWL did not maintain any elevated water tanks and all system pressure was generated via pumping.

== Water Utility ==
The Lansing Board of Water & Light obtains all raw water from a series of wells located throughout the city of Lansing, making it one of the few public utilities for large cities that provides water exclusively from wells. The city sits atop, and draws its water from, the Saginaw Aquifer, a natural, but limited, underground reservoir 4 cubic miles (17 km^{3}), and 550 square miles (1,400 km^{2}) in size. The raw water is pumped directly to two conditioning plants: the John Dye plant located in downtown Lansing and the Wise Road plant located on the southwest side of the city. At these plants, water hardness is reduced from approximately 411 parts per million (ppm) to about 85 ppm. The finished water is then chlorinated and fluorinated, and sent to storage prior to distribution.

At the John Dye conditioning plant, two pumping stations draw finished water from three ground level storage facilities and pump to the distribution system. The Dye pump station, pumps water to the north towards Dewitt Township, Bath Township, and Watertown Township, to the west to Delta Township, and to the local distribution system. The Cedar Street pump station provides supplemental pumping capacity during periods of high demand. The Wise Road conditioning plants similarly pumps water directly into the distribution system, and generally feeds portions of Windsor Township, Delhi Township, and Alaiedon Township.

The Lansing Board of Water & Light retail customers consist of residential, commercial and industrial customers within the service areas, totaling approximately 56,000 customers. Approximately 48,000 of these customers are residential, 7,000 commercial, while the remaining customers consist of industrial customers. In addition, the Lansing Board of Water & Light sells water on a wholesale basis to the local distribution systems in Delta Township and Meridian Township.

== Electric Utility ==
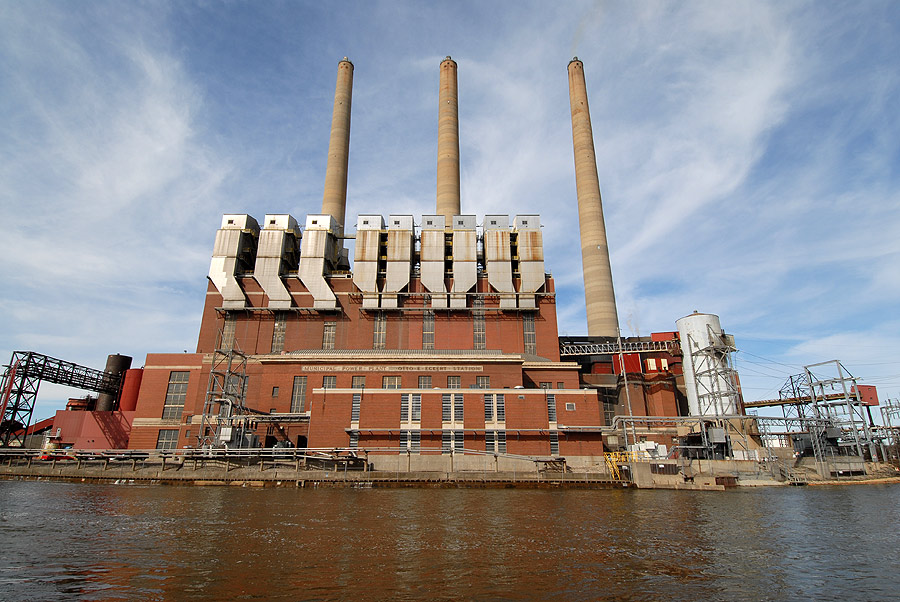
Otto E. Eckert Station.

As of 2023, LBWL's power utility has 86,789 residential customers and 12,368 commercial and industrial customers for a total of 99,137 customers.

=== Former facilities ===
In 2020, BWL decommissioned Otto E. Eckert Station, named after the utility's general manager from 1927 to 1966. The former coal-fired generating station is located in downtown Lansing on the Grand River, adjacent to General Motors' Grand River Assembly Plant and the now-demolished Lansing Car Assembly Plant. Begun in 1922 and completed the following year, the power station has undergone numerous expansions and additions since, with the addition of the three chimneys in 1981. The station had a generating capacity of 351 megawatts, produced by burning coal from Wyoming's Powder River Basin. This plant has three 615-foot (187 m) smokestacks, the tallest self-supporting structures in south central Michigan. These stacks are visible from twenty miles (32 km) on a clear day. The stacks are known locally by the names of Wynken, Blynken, and Nod, after the fishermen in a poem of the same name by Eugene Field. It was announced in December 2017 that the plant decommissioning had been accelerated, and would go offline in 2020.

From 1973 to 2022, BWL operated the Claud R. Erickson Station, named after general manager of the utility from 1966 to 1972. The plant located in Delta Township on Canal Road just south of Mt. Hope Road. This coal-fired plant had a single generating unit with a capacity of 159 MW connected to the power grid by three 138 kV lines.

The utility's power plant inventory once included the 25 megawatt Ottawa Street Station on the Grand River in downtown Lansing. This steam and electrical plant operated from its completion in 1940 until 1992, when it was decommissioned as a power station, with steam and electrical production transferred to the Eckert Station. The station was put back into partial usage as a water chiller plant for the utility in 2001 to cool downtown buildings. In late 2007, LBWL sold the mostly vacant station to Accident Fund Insurance Company, which was renovated into their headquarters. At the end of December of that year, in preparation for the renovation, the iconic smokestack portion of the building was taken down.

=== Current facilities ===
As an eventual replacement for the aging Eckert Station, the utility began operating the REO Town Cogeneration Plant on July 1, 2013. The eight-story, 160,000 sq ft (15,000 m^{2}) cogeneration facility located on Washington Avenue in Lansing's REO Town district has a capacity of 100 MW, and burns natural gas to generate electricity and steam. It also includes the utility's headquarters and a restored Grand Trunk Western Railroad depot, which is used as the boardroom for the utility and as meeting space. The LBWL announced in December 2017 that they would be replacing Erickson Station with a $500 million natural gas-fired power plant capable of generating 250 MW. The Delta Energy Park opened in March 2022 with a nameplate capacity of 260 MW on the site of the former Erickson Station.

To achieve the state-mandated 10% renewable energy requirement by 2015, the company has built or acquired power through purchase agreements from several new sources. They contracted for 19.2MW from eight new wind turbines at the Beebe Wind Farm in Gratiot County. Lansing Board of Water and Light owns the 0.5MW Moores Park hydroelectric plant on the Grand River and the 0.16MW Cedar Street Solar Array. It also purchases power from the Tower/Kleber Hydro plant near Cheboygan and the Granger Landfill Energy plant. Lansing Board of Water & Light has issued a request for proposals for 20MW of additional solar power.

During periods of high demand, the Lansing Board of Water and Light purchases electricity from MISO. The BWL has two 138KV interconnections (Davis-Oneida line and the Davis-Enterprise line) with Consumers Energy/METC from its substation on Jolly Road just east of Pennsylvania Ave on Lansing's south side. The utility also owns a portion of Detroit Edison's Belle River Power Plant near St. Clair, Michigan.

=== Generation mix ===
For the fiscal year that ended with June 2023, LBWL consumed 464 GWh of renewable energy, out of a total of 2,883 GWh for a total of 16% renewable energy. In 2023, they announced plans to build 160 MW of battery storage generating capacity, 65 MW of solar, and 433 MW of wind power by end of the 2027. LBWL received $12 million from the MPSC to install 10 MW of solar and 4 hours of 40 MW battery storage (160 MWh capacity) on the Delta Energy Park site.

Although it claims to have met its self-imposed goal to use 30% clean energy by 2020, the metrics they used to determine this are unclear. LBWL has described natural gas as "clean," despite the fact that it is a significant source of CO_{2} emissions. Critics allege that they have engaged in misleading messaging and greenwashing.

== See also ==
- List of public utilities
