= J. H. Campbell Generating Plant =

Coal-fired power station in Michigan

- Country: United States
- Location: West Olive, Michigan
- Coordinates: 42°54′43.5″N 86°12′08.3″W
- Status: Operational
- Commission date: Unit 1:1962; Unit 2:1967; Unit 3:1980
- Owner: Consumers Energy
- Operator: Consumers Energy

Thermal power station
- Primary fuel: Subbituminous Coal
- Turbine technology: Steam turbine

Power generation
- Units operational: 1 X 265 MW; 1 X 385 MW; 1 X 770 MW
- Nameplate capacity: 1,420 MW
- Annual net output: 7,669 Gwh (2025)

J.H. Campbell Generating Plant

J. H. Campbell Generating Plant is a 1,420 MW, three-unit coal-fired generating plant in West Olive, Michigan which uses sub-bituminous coal. It is owned and operated by Consumers Energy, a subsidiary of CMS Energy.

== History ==
The plant began operating in 1962. As of 2020, the plant had three units: unit 1 produces 265 MW, unit 2 produces 385 MW, and unit 3 produces 770 MW.

All units were scheduled to be closed in May 2025 as per CMS Energy's plan to eliminate coal use by 2040. Consumers Energy estimated that the closure would save ratepayers $600 million by 2040. On May 23, 2025, the US Department of Energy under Chris Wright ordered the plant to stay open "at least until late August [2025], claiming possible electricity shortfalls in the central U.S." Grid operator Midcontinent Independent System Operator stated, however, that it had "adequate resources to meet peak demand" during the summer of 2025 without the plant.

The Trump administration intervened again in August 2025 to extend the operation of the plant until at least November 2025, imposing costs of $1 million per day on ratepayers during the extended operating period. In November 2025, the US Department of Energy ordered the plant to remain open for an additional 90 days; in response, the Attorney General of Michigan filed a motion to halt what she labeled as the "arbitrary and illegal" order to keep the plant running. In July 2026, Wisconsin Governor Tony Evers sent a letter to the DOE calling for an end to the arbitrary time extensions. In addition to costs passed on the Michigan ratepayers, it is estimated that running the plant will cost Wisconsin ratepayers $117 million.

In September 2026, the U.S. Court of Appeals for the District of Columbia Circuit rejected the Energy Department's emergency order that kept the plant running months past its planned retirement date. Writing the opinion for the court, Judge Cornelia Pillard said:“Our reading of the text, structure, and history leaves us unpersuaded by DOE's sweeping conception of its ‘emergency’ authority. The Department's position would empower it to pick its preferred power sources in Michigan or, presumably, any other state, and order them to operate without regard to the multiple procedural and substantive constraints built into state reliability planning processes.” The decision was joined by Chief Judge Sri Srinivasan and Judge Robert Wilkins.

== Environmental impact ==
In 2024, the plant released 8,112,873 tons of CO_{2}, 4,920 tons of SO_{2}, and 2,932 tons of NO_{x}.

There are three ponds at the plant which are used to store coal ash. Environmental groups like the Michigan Environmental Council claim that heavy metals and other residuals from these ponds have been leaking into groundwater. In response, CMS Energy is now emptying these ponds and transferring the coal ash to landfills.

== See also ==
- Coal-fired Power plant
- Coal Mining in the United States
- Coal Power in the United States
- Electricity Sector of the United States
- Energy in the United States
- List of coal-fired power stations in the United States
- List of natural gas-fired power stations in the United States
- List of power stations in Michigan
- List of power stations in the United States
