= DTE Electric Company =

American electric power company

DTE Electric Company (formerly The Detroit Edison Company) is an investor-owned electric utility founded in 1886 in Detroit, Michigan. As the largest electric utility in Michigan, it serves approximately 2.3 million customers in the southeastern portion of the state.

As of 2022, 68.58% of DTE's electricity generation came from coal, gas, and oil sources, exceeding the regional average of 65.82%. The utility's emissions of major pollutants, including carbon dioxide, sulfur dioxide, and nitrogen oxides, also surpass regional averages, though its high-level nuclear waste output is comparatively lower.

DTE Electric provides service to most of Southeast Michigan, parts of the Michigan thumb region and portions of Western Michigan

The company maintains one of the largest electric distribution networks in the Midwest, with over 44,000 miles (71,000 km) of power lines.

== History ==
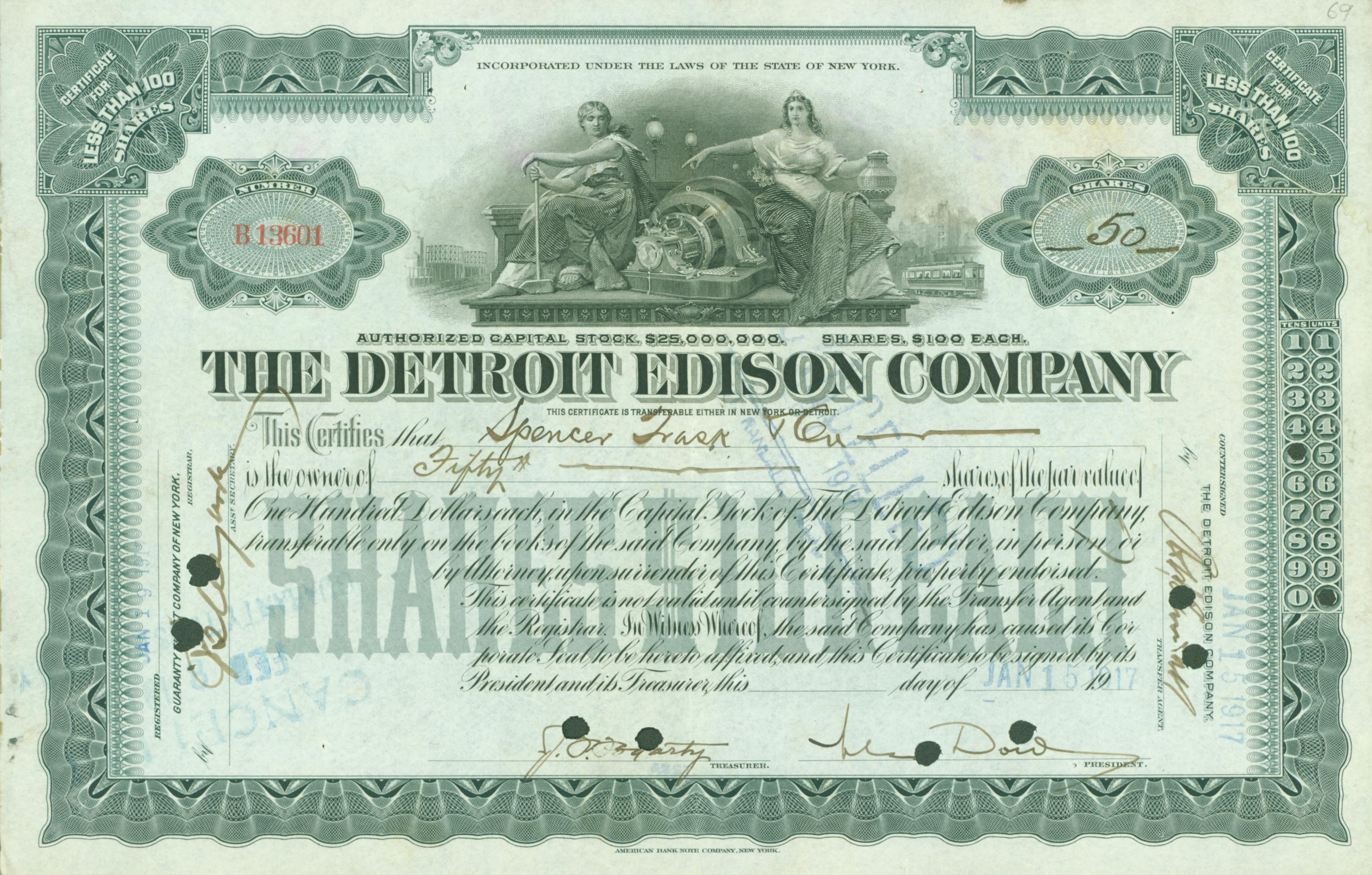
Share of the Detroit Edison Company, issued 15 January 1917

Detroit Edison was part of a large holding company called North American Edison Company. North American's stock had once been one of the twelve component stocks of the May 1896 original Dow Jones Industrial Average. North American Company was broken up by the Securities and Exchange Commission, following the United States Supreme Court decision of April 1, 1946.

After that, Detroit Edison operated independently, and publicly traded on the New York Stock Exchange under the ticker symbol DTE through the mid-1990s. In early 1996, it became an operating subsidiary of the new holding company, DTE Energy Company, which replaced Detroit Edison Company on the stock exchange, and took over the trading ticker symbol.

== Power generation ==
=== Fossil Fuel Plants ===
Current operating DTE Energy's coal and natural gas power plants:

Plant name	Type	County	Year(s) built	Capacity	Planned Retirement
Monroe	Coal	Monroe	1971–1974	3300 MW	Units 3 & 4: 2028 Units 1 & 2: 2032
Belle River	Coal	St. Clair	1984–1985	1664 MW	Unit 1: 2025 (gas conversion) Unit 2: 2026 (gas conversion)
Blue Water Energy Center	Natural Gas	St. Clair	2018-2022	1150 MW	
Greenwood Energy Center	Oil & Natural Gas	St. Clair	1979	815 MW	

In 2016, DTE Energy announced the retirement of three coal-fired generating units among its plants by 2023. The plants are located in River Rouge, St. Clair in East China Township and Trenton. In sum, the plants power around 900,000 homes. The Detroit Free Press wrote that employees at the closing plants will be able to transfer to other facilities and will not lose their jobs.

River Rouge Power Plant's retirement was expedited to 2021 with its last megawatt produced on May 31, 2021, and formally retired on June 4, 2021.

Trenton Channel Power Plant and St. Clair Power Plant retired in 2022, replaced by renewable energy projects.

It was announced on December 8, 2022, that Monroe Power Plant will retire units 3 and 4 in 2028 and units 1 and 2 in 2032 (originally 2042). Belle River Power Plant will be repurposed to become a natural gas plant in 2026 (originally 2028). The Belle River gas conversion project is expected to extend the life of the plant by at least 13 more years.

The Greenwood Energy Center near Avoca, Michigan serves as a peaking power plant for the utility, generating over 815mW when at full capacity. A turbine replacement project in 2024 is expected to add another 25 years of useful life to the plant, with no current plans to retire the facility.

In 2018, the Michigan Public Service Commission approved Blue Water Energy Center, a natural gas combined-cycle plan. This will replace three retiring coal plants, reducing carbon emissions by 70 percent, and provide power to 850,000 homes.

Blue Water Energy Center began commercial operation on June 6, 2022.

=== Nuclear ===
DTE operates one nuclear plant, Enrico Fermi Nuclear Generating Station, generating 21% of DTE Electric's power.

Two nuclear reactors were planned for the Greenwood Energy Center site near Avoca, but were never completed.

=== Renewable ===
Since 2009, DTE has driven investment of $2.8 billion in renewable energy assets, increasing to $4.8 billion by 2024.

Since April 2021, DTE Electric operates 18 wind and 31 solar parks, totaling 1,760 megawatts of clean energy, powering 670,000 homes.

==== Wind ====
DTE has 18 operational wind parks in their portfolio. As the state's largest investor in and producer of wind energy, DTE produces enough energy from renewable sources to power more than 500,000 homes.

==== Solar ====
DTE operates 31 solar parks in Michigan. In May 2016, the company broke ground on a solar array project in Lapeer, Michigan touted as the largest utility-owned solar array east of the Mississippi River. Lapeer Solar Park generates enough electricity to power 9,000 homes. DTE Energy also operates a 10-acre solar installation in Detroit on the site of the abandoned O'Shea Park.

=== Hydro ===
DTE and Consumers Energy co-own the Ludington Pumped Storage Plant on Lake Michigan in Mason County, Michigan.

=== Landfill-based gas-to-energy operations ===
In May 2017, DTE Energy announced it had acquired "two landfill-based gas-to-energy operations" in Texas. The company wants to expand its operations to alternative vehicle fuel. The operations it acquired were the Fort Bend Power Producers, LLC facility outside of Rosenberg, Texas and the Seabreaze landfill gas development in Angleton, Texas, which has yet to be developed.

After these projects are operational, the company will have five "landfill conversion facilities which capture and convert dangerous landfill gases to pipeline-quality renewable natural gas". The gases will go to fueling transit buses.

== Energy Storage ==
In 2024, DTE Energy announced that it was transforming the land formerly occupied by the Trenton Channel Power Plant into a 220 MW battery energy storage center.

Plant name	County	Year(s) built	Capacity
Trenton Channel Energy Center	Wayne	2024-2026	220 MW

== Energy transmission ==
As a condition of electric utility deregulation in Michigan, DTE Energy was forced to sell off Detroit Edison's sister subsidiary involved in high-voltage energy transmission: International Transmission Co. (ITC).

== Energy distribution ==
Detroit Edison's near 11-gigawatt generating capacity is offered to its 7,600-square-mile (20,000 km^{2}) service area, which encompasses 13 counties in the southeastern portion of the lower peninsula. Energy is distributed via one million utility poles and 44,000 miles (71,000 km) of power lines in these Michigan counties: Huron, Tuscola, Sanilac, Saint Clair, Lapeer, Livingston, Ingham, Oakland, Macomb, Wayne, Washtenaw, Lenawee, and Monroe.

Detroit Edison's distribution line voltages are three-phase 4,800 volts (Delta) 4,800/8,320 volts (wye) and 7,620/13,200 volts (Wye) . All new distribution circuits constructed after 1959 are 13,200 volts. The 8,320 volt distribution lines are located in Pontiac, Michigan in an area that was served by Consumers Power Company until the mid-1980s when the area was acquired by Detroit Edison. Edison's subtransmission line voltages are 24,000 volts and 41,600 volts.

== EES Coke Battery Facility ==
EES Coke, a subsidiary of DTE Energy, operates a coke battery facility in River Rouge, Michigan. The facility, which produces metallurgical coke for steelmaking, has been a source of significant environmental and public health concerns in the downriver Detroit area.

=== History and Operations ===
The facility was originally built in 1967 by McLouth Steel and was acquired by DTE Energy in 2008. It processes coal into coke, which is used in blast furnaces for steel production. The facility has a production capacity of approximately 1.1 million tons of coke annually.

=== Environmental Impact ===
The EES Coke facility has been a major source of air pollution in Wayne County. Environmental monitoring has shown that the facility regularly emits:

- Sulfur dioxide (SO2)
- Particulate matter
- Volatile organic compounds (VOCs)
- Benzene and other hazardous air pollutants

The EES Coke facility's operations have significantly affected nearby communities in River Rouge, Ecorse, and Southwest Detroit. These predominantly low-income and minority neighborhoods have experienced disproportionate environmental burden from industrial operations.

- Childhood asthma rates in the area are 3.5 times higher than the state average
- Emergency room visits for respiratory issues increased 56% between 2015-2022
- Local health surveys have documented elevated rates of chronic bronchitis, emphysema, and cardiovascular disease

=== Regulatory Issues and Violations ===
The facility has faced multiple regulatory actions and violations. In 2018, the Michigan Department of Environment, Great Lakes, and Energy (EGLE) issued violations for exceeding permitted emission limits. A 2020 EPA investigation found multiple Clean Air Act violations. In 2022, the facility was fined $1.8 million for air quality violations and required to install additional pollution controls

=== Public Health Studies ===
Several health studies have examined the facility's impact. A 2021 University of Michigan study found elevated levels of respiratory problems in neighborhoods near the facility. Cancer risk assessments by the EPA have identified elevated risks in the surrounding area. Local health departments have reported higher rates of asthma and other respiratory conditions in nearby communities

=== Future Plans and Mitigation Efforts ===
In response to regulatory pressure and community concerns, DTE Energy announced in 2023 a $150 million environmental upgrade project for the facility. However, environmental groups and community advocates continue to call for the facility's closure, arguing that the planned improvements are insufficient to protect public health.

== DTE Rail Service Inc. ==
With the bankruptcy of the Penn Central Transportation railroad in 1970, Detroit Edison sought to continue transporting coal from the Monongahela mines in Pennsylvania to a brand new power plant in Monroe, Michigan. However, the bankruptcy of Penn Central left Detroit Edison short of motive power and under capacitated coal hoppers. Detroit Edison then chose to purchase brand new locomotives and coal cars to fit their needs. Purchasing EMD SD40's and GE U30C's for mainline motive power as well as High-Side Articulated Gondolas (with a capacity of 185,000 pounds), this new equipment allowed Detroit Edison to move more coal en masse than what Penn Central was able to do with their equipment. The trains were maintained by Detroit Edison officials but operated by Penn Central crews.

By the late 1980s or early 1990, Detroit Edison discontinued use of their equipment, as Conrail began to supply enough locomotives and rolling stock to meet the power company's needs.

== Political Contributions and Lobbying Activities ==
DTE Energy maintains an active presence in political funding and lobbying activities at both state and federal levels. The company operates a political action committee, DTE Energy PAC.

In Michigan state politics, DTE Energy maintains extensive political influence as one of the largest corporate political donors. As of 2022, 93% of Michigan legislators had accepted DTE Energy money during their careers. Between 2016 and 2020, the company and its affiliated donors contributed over $1.4 million to state-level candidates and committees.

Contributions included significant support for both Republican and Democratic leadership PACs in the state legislature. The company's political giving has particularly focused on legislative leadership and members of energy-related committees who have significant influence over utility policy. Notable recipients of DTE-linked contributions include:

- Governor Gretchen Whitmer: $235,900
- Senate President Pro Tempore Aric Nesbitt: $70,500
- Rep. Joe Bellino (House Energy Policy Committee Chair): $39,320
- Sen. Dale Zorn: $33,475
- Senate Democratic Leader Sam Singh: $30,200

Beyond direct campaign contributions, DTE operates through dark money groups to extend its political influence.In 2019, an investigation by the Detroit News revealed that the company had channeled over $800,000 through nonprofit social welfare organizations to support specific ballot initiatives without direct disclosure.In 2012, DTE Energy spent approximately $11.6 million opposing Proposal 3, which would have mandated that 25% of Michigan's electricity come from renewable sources by 2025.

Michigan Energy First, run by DTE executives, contributed:

- $650,000 to Michigan Republican Party-linked funds
- $250,000 to Michigan Democratic Party-linked funds
- $100,000 to funds supporting Governor Whitmer

Protect Our Values, another DTE-connected group, emerged to support favored candidates in primary elections. The company has used these groups to spread information opposing pro-solar legislation and other clean energy initiatives

While publicly supporting carbon reduction goals, the company has faced criticism from environmental groups for lobbying against certain clean energy initiatives. According to lobbying disclosure records, the company spent $3.2 million between 2018-2022 on efforts related to renewable energy legislation, while simultaneously advocating for policies that environmental groups argue would slow the transition to renewable energy. The company's contributions to trade associations that oppose climate regulations, such as the Edison Electric Institute, have drawn particular attention from climate advocacy organizations.

The company has also faced criticism for its involvement in local elections. In 2022, an investigation by ProPublica highlighted DTE Energy's role in financing political action committees that targeted municipal elections where renewable energy initiatives were being considered.

DTE's political spending has had significant effects on energy policy in Michigan:

- Committee chairs who received substantial DTE contributions have blocked hearings on renewable energy legislation
- The company has successfully opposed efforts to remove Michigan's cap on distributed solar generation
- Critics argue DTE's influence has prevented meaningful legislative action on reliability issues despite chronic outages

Consumer advocacy groups have raised concerns about the relationship between DTE Energy's political spending and its rate increase requests. A 2023 report by the Michigan Consumer Protection Alliance suggested a correlation between the company's political contributions to state legislators and favorable outcomes in rate case decisions.

Environmental justice advocates note the company's support for politicians opposing expanded voting access in communities of color contrasts with its public equity commitments

In 2021, campaign finance watchdogs criticized DTE Energy's practice of making contributions to politicians who questioned the results of the 2020 presidential election. The company temporarily suspended some political contributions following the January 6 Capitol riot but resumed them later that year, drawing criticism from governance experts.

Since 2018, DTE Energy has published an annual political contribution report detailing its political spending and lobbying activities. The company's board of directors maintains oversight of political activities through its Public Policy and Responsibility Committee. The company has faced scrutiny from shareholder advocacy groups regarding its political spending transparency. In 2022, a shareholder proposal requesting enhanced disclosure of political contributions received 43% support at the annual meeting.

== Service Reliability and Infrastructure ==
DTE Energy has faced ongoing criticism for its service reliability, particularly in Southeast Michigan. The company consistently ranks below average among U.S. utilities for grid reliability metrics, including both the frequency and duration of power outages.

Between 2019-2023, DTE customers experienced an average of 5.3 power outages per year, significantly higher than the national average of 1.4 outages. The average outage duration for DTE customers was 9.2 hours, compared to the national average of 3.1 hours. In 2021, following widespread outages that affected over 500,000 customers, the Michigan Public Service Commission (MPSC) launched an investigation into DTE's infrastructure maintenance and reliability programs. A 2022 audit commissioned by the MPSC found that:

- 58% of DTE's distribution poles were over 40 years old, exceeding their expected service life
- The company's tree-trimming program covered only 70% of recommended maintenance areas
- Preventive maintenance spending was 23% below industry benchmarks

Poor reliability has led to increased customer complaints and public criticism. In 2022, DTE faced multiple class-action lawsuits from customers seeking compensation for losses due to extended outages. Consumer advocacy groups have argued that the company's reliability issues disproportionately affect low-income communities and elderly residents. In 2023, DTE was ordered to pay $25 million in customer credits following extended outages, and the commission mandated a comprehensive infrastructure improvement plan.

In response to criticism and regulatory pressure, DTE announced a $7 billion grid modernization plan in 2023. The plan includes:

- Accelerated pole replacement program
- Enhanced tree trimming and vegetation management
- Installation of smart grid technology
- Underground cable replacement in high-outage areas

However, critics have questioned whether the improvements will adequately address systemic reliability issues, particularly as climate change increases the frequency of severe weather events.

=== Notable Outage Events ===
In August 2023, severe storms led to what became DTE's second-largest outage event in company history, with more than 775,000 customers losing power. Some residents remained without electricity for up to eight days, prompting public outcry and investigations by state regulators.

In February 2023, a massive ice storm impacting the Southern part of the state left approximately 641,000 DTE customers without power. The extended restoration time, which exceeded seven days for many customers, led to particular criticism as temperatures remained below freezing.

In August 2021, successive storms resulted in more than 500,000 outages. The company's response drew criticism when it was revealed that some customers experienced up to five separate outages within a single month.

During a June 2021 heat wave, equipment failures at multiple substations led to rolling blackouts affecting 265,000 customers in the Metro Detroit area. The timing was particularly problematic as temperatures exceeded 95°F (35°C).
