= Lake Winds Energy Park =

Wind farm in Mason County, Michigan

- Country: United States
- Location: Mason County, Michigan
- Coordinates: 44.02°N 86.50°W
- Status: Operational
- Construction began: 2011
- Operator: Consumers Energy

Wind farm
- Type: Onshore

Power generation
- Nameplate capacity: 100.8 MW

External links
- Website: www.lakewindsenergypark.com

Lake Winds Energy Park is a wind farm located in Mason County, Michigan. The farm began production in August 2012 and is currently operated by Consumers Energy. It is home to a total of 56 wind turbines that produce a total of just over 100MW of power. The turbines, which were constructed by Vestas-American Wind Technology, Inc., take advantage of the western winds generated by Lake Michigan to produce power.

== Construction ==
=== Proposal ===
The Lake Winds Energy Park development project originated from the 2008 law passed in Michigan requiring that renewable energy accounts for at least 10% of total energy production in the state by 2015. Consumers Energy presented the idea of creating a wind farm in Mason County because it was the ideal location to harness wind for energy production. This was motivated Consumer Energy's commitment to double it renewable energy production between 2007 and 2032. Construction of the wind farm began in fall of 2011 and ran until August 2012.

=== Environmental restrictions ===
Consumers Energy called upon White Construction, Inc. to complete the construction of the project. Unlike most wind farms, the turbines in the Lake Winds Energy Park are distributed throughout Mason County rather than being concentrated in a single area. This required a unique construction process. Besides finding an open area for each wind turbine, roads had to be constructed to allow access to each turbine. In addition, strict sound regulations had to be met so that the public would be willing to keep the turbines running. A phenomenon called "flicker" led to another design restriction. Flicker is the moving shadow that results from the motion of the wind turbine blades. The Mason County Zoning Committee required that flicker on the external wall of a dwelling could not exceed 10 total hours in a year. In order to meet this demand, the turbines in the Lake Winds Energy Park shut down for a short period of time at around midday, when maximum flicker was expected to occur. According to post-construction surveys performed in the area, the Lake Winds Energy Park met all required environmental standards related to sound and flicker.

== Power supply ==
Each wind turbine used in the wind farm is a V100 rated at 1.8MW. In total the farm produces just over 100MW of power that is distributed by Consumers Energy throughout the state of Michigan. The Lake Winds Energy Park contributes to the 1,350MW of wind energy being produced in the state of Michigan at the time of their grand opening, making up 2.4% of total energy production in the state. Wind energy is required to make up 10% of total energy production by the end of 2015.
