= Monroe Power Plant =

Coal-fired power station located in Monroe, Michigan

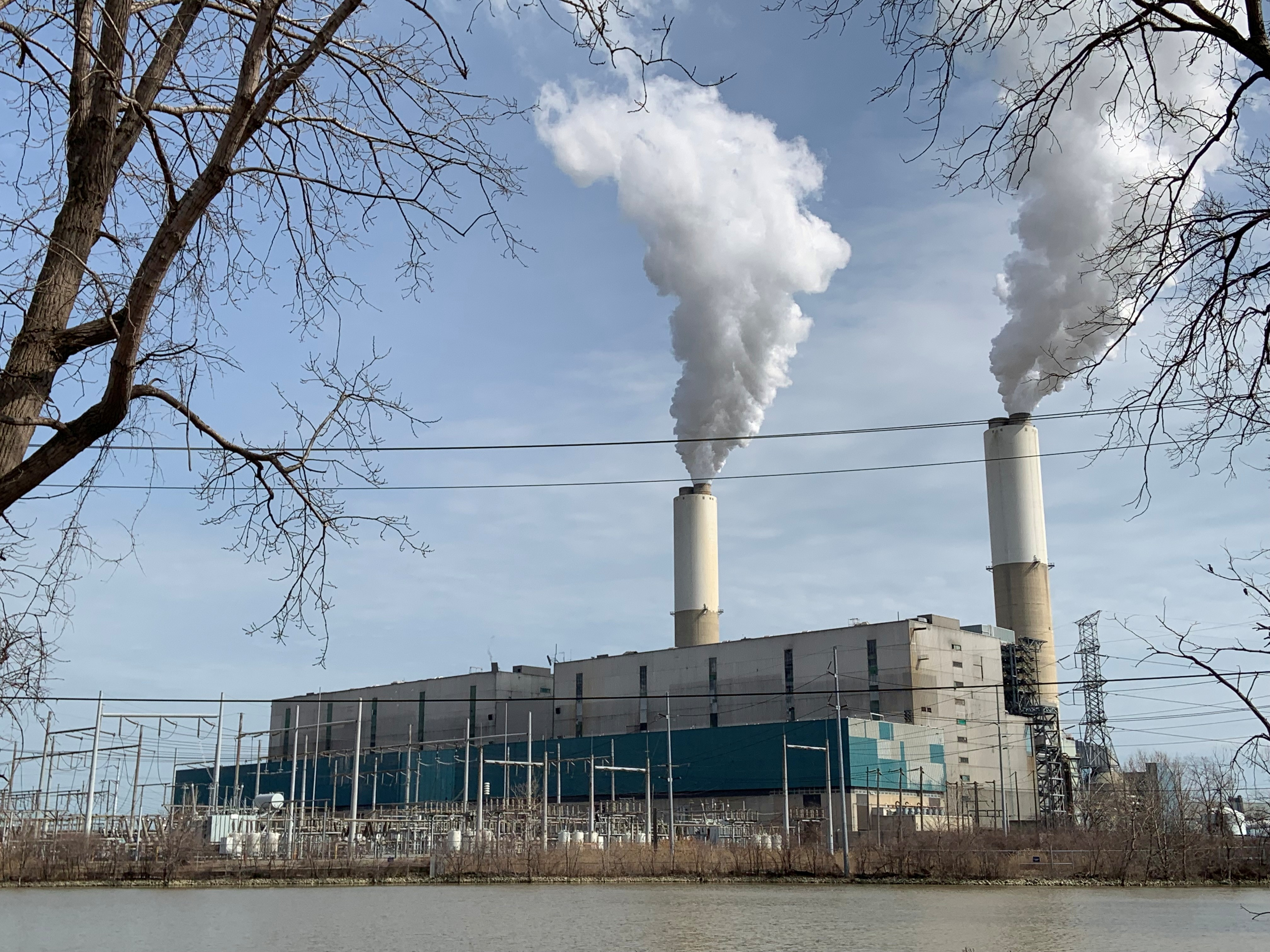
- DTE Electric Company's Monroe Power Plant
- Location of Monroe Power Plant in Michigan
- Country: United States
- Location: Monroe, Michigan
- Coordinates: 41°53′21″N 83°20′44″W
- Status: Operational
- Commission date: 1971
- Owner: DTE Energy Electric Company

Thermal power station
- Primary fuel: Coal
- Turbine technology: Steam turbine

Power generation
- Units operational: 4
- Nameplate capacity: 3,400 megawatts

External links
- Commons: Related media on Commons

The Monroe Power Plant is a coal-fired power plant located in Monroe, Michigan, on the western shore of Lake Erie. It is owned by the DTE Energy Electric Company, a subsidiary of DTE Energy. The plant was constructed in the early 1970s and began operating in 1971. The plant has 4 generating units, each with an output of 850 megawatts. With all four generating units operating, the plant's total output is 3,300 megawatts (3,400 MW total, with 100 MW required for the plant machinery to run). This makes it the eleventh largest electric plant in the United States.

The Monroe Power Plant connects to the power grid by numerous 120,000- and 345,000-volt transmission lines, owned and maintained by ITC Transmission. Two of the 345 kV lines going out of the plant interconnect with FirstEnergy in Ohio (Bayshore-Monroe line and the Majestic-Monroe-Allen Junction Line).

In its 2022 Integrated Resource Plan, DTE sped up the timeline for retirement from the previous date of 2040. The plant is scheduled to close two of its units in 2028. The remaining two units are planned to close by 2032, moved up from 2035 in 2023. No plans are in place as of yet to replace the 3,400 megawatts that this plant generates.

== Flue gas treatment ==
The Monroe Power Plant did significant upgrades and maintenance at the facility in late 2007 and 2008. Flue-gas desulfurization (FGD) units, or sulfur-oxide "scrubbers", are in operation on all four of Monroe's generating units. These devices reduce over 95% of the sulfur dioxide (SO_{2}) emissions.

Selective catalytic reduction (SCR) systems reduce the amount of NO_{x} by combining NH_{3} with the NO_{x} over an SCR catalyst to reduce 90% of the NO_{x} to water and nitrogen. Currently all of the generating units use SCRs.

== See also ==
- List of largest power stations in the United States
- List of power stations in Michigan
