= East China Township, Michigan =

- Charter township
- Charter Township of East China
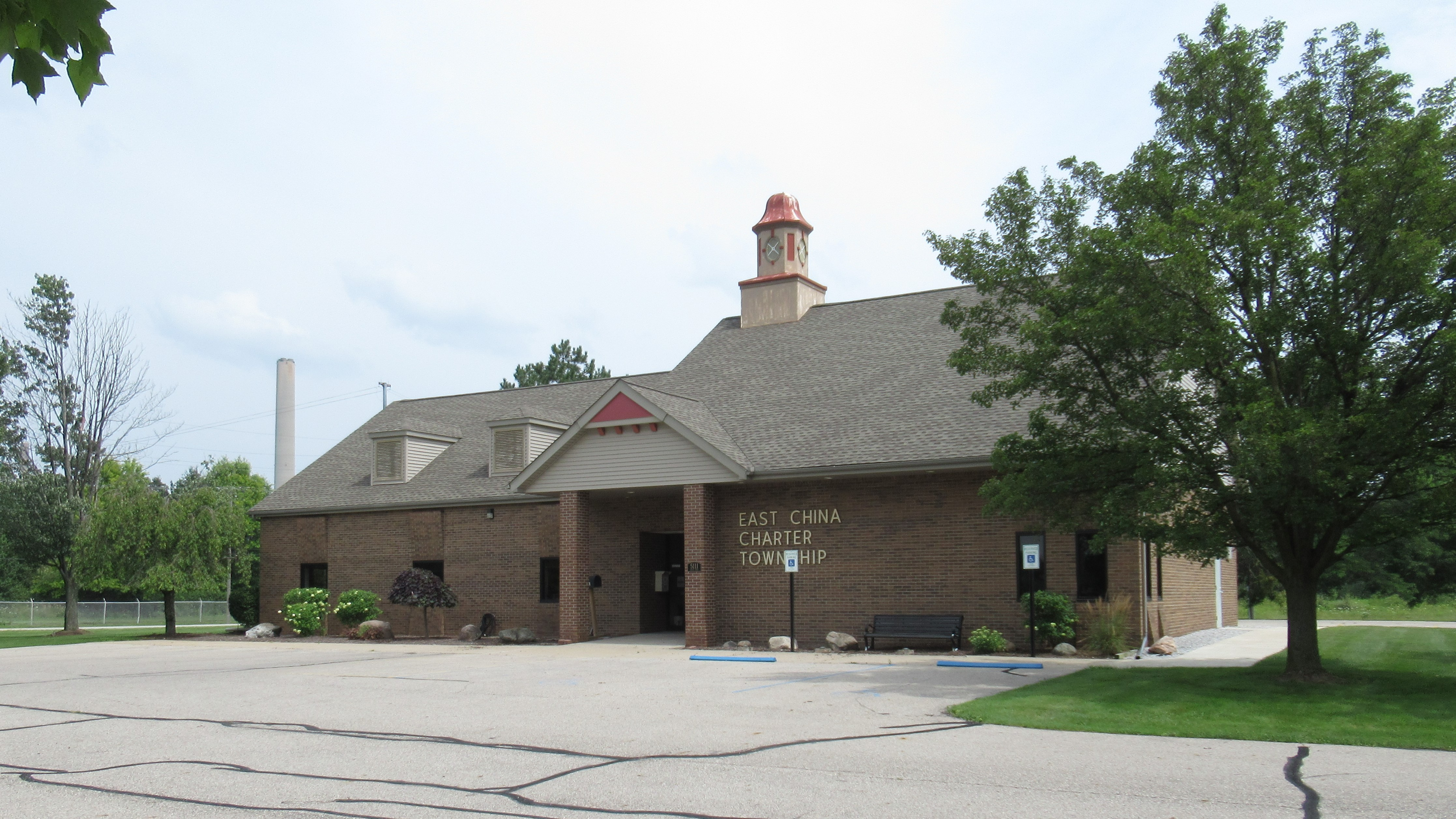
- East China Charter Township Hall

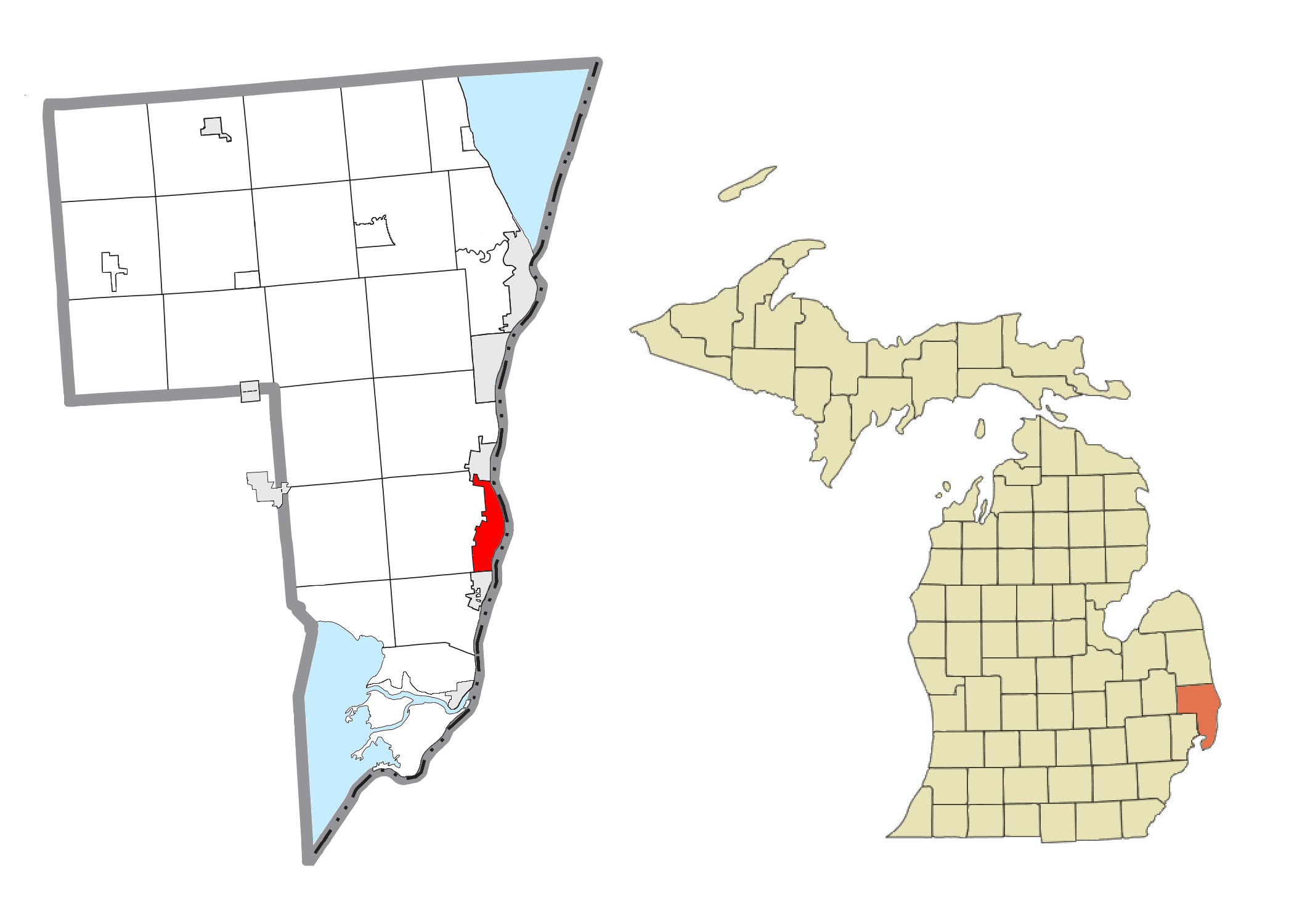
- Location within St. Clair County

- Location within the state of Michigan Location within the United States
- Coordinates: 42°46′39″N 82°28′52″W
- Country: United States
- State: Michigan
- County: St. Clair
- Established: 1859

Government
  - Supervisor: Verne Westrick
  - Clerk: Sandra Smith

Area
  - Total: 7.84 sq mi (20.31 km^{2})
  - Land: 6.58 sq mi (17.04 km^{2})
  - Water: 1.26 sq mi (3.26 km^{2})
- Elevation: 587 ft (179 m)

Population (2020)
  - Total: 3,704
  - Density: 562.92/sq mi (217.34/km^{2})
- Time zone: UTC-5 (Eastern (EST))
  - Summer (DST): UTC-4 (EDT)
- ZIP code(s): 48054 (East China)
- Area code: 810
- FIPS code: 26-23820
- GNIS feature ID: 1626203
- Website: Official website

East China Township is a charter township of St. Clair County in the U.S. state of Michigan. The population was 3,704 at the 2020 Census.

== History ==
The township was named after China Township, Michigan.

== Geography ==
According to the United States Census Bureau, the township has a total area of 7.8 square miles (20 km^{2}), of which 6.7 square miles (17 km^{2}) is land and 1.1 square miles (2.8 km^{2}) (14.69%) is water.

== Communities ==
- Hawthorne is an unincorporated community on Remer Road, east of River Road/M-29 (42°46′24″N 82°28′22″W; Elevation: 591 ft./180 m.)

== Demographics ==
As of the census of 2000, there were 3,630 people, 1,467 households, and 1,007 families residing in the township. The population density was 542.9 inhabitants per square mile (209.6/km^{2}). There were 1,577 housing units at an average density of 235.9 per square mile (91.1/km^{2}). The racial makeup of the township was 98.57% White, 0.22% African American, 0.28% Native American, 0.19% Asian, 0.03% Pacific Islander, 0.06% from other races, and 0.66% from two or more races. Hispanic or Latino of any race were 0.52% of the population.

There were 1,467 households, out of which 25.8% had children under the age of 18 living with them, 59.4% were married couples living together, 6.1% had a female householder with no husband present, and 31.3% were non-families. 27.8% of all households were made up of individuals, and 15.3% had someone living alone who was 65 years of age or older. The average household size was 2.38 and the average family size was 2.90.

In the township the population was spread out, with 20.5% under the age of 18, 6.8% from 18 to 24, 24.8% from 25 to 44, 27.9% from 45 to 64, and 20.0% who were 65 years of age or older. The median age was 44 years. For every 100 females, there were 92.0 males. For every 100 females age 18 and over, there were 88.8 males.

The median income for a household in the township was $51,652, and the median income for a family was $65,597. Males had a median income of $47,104 versus $30,625 for females. The per capita income for the township was $26,792. About 2.2% of families and 4.6% of the population were below the poverty line, including 5.0% of those under age 18 and 7.7% of those age 65 or over.

== Economy ==
East China Township is home to the St. Clair and Belle River Power Plants.
