= Michigan Public Service Commission =

Public utilities commission of the state of Michigan

Commission overview
- Formed: 1939
- Jurisdiction: State of Michigan
- Headquarters: 7109 W. Saginaw Highway Lansing MI
- Commission executives: Daniel C. Scripps, Chair; Katherine L. Peretick, Commissioner; Shaquila Myers, Commissioner
- Parent department: Michigan Department of Licensing and Regulatory Affairs
- Website: michigan.gov/mpsc

The Michigan Public Service Commission (MPSC) is a regulatory agency which regulates public utilities in the state of Michigan, including electric power, telecommunications, and natural gas services. The MPSC's headquarters are located in Lansing, Michigan.

== Mission ==
The mission of the MPSC is to protect the public by ensuring safe, reliable, and accessible energy and telecommunications services at reasonable rates for Michigan's residents.

== Commissioners ==
The MPSC is composed of three members appointed by the Governor with the advice and consent of the Senate. Commissioners are appointed to serve staggered six-year terms. No more than two Commissioners may represent the same political party. One commissioner is designated as chairman by the Governor.

Commissioner	Appointed	Term ends	Appointed by
Katherine L. Peretick	January 4, 2021	July 2, 2027	Gretchen Whitmer (D)
Daniel C. Scripps (Chairman)	February 25, 2019	July 2, 2029	Gretchen Whitmer (D)
Shaquila Myers	July 21, 2025	July 2, 2031	Gretchen Whitmer (D)

Dan Scripps is a Democrat, Katherine Peretick is an Independent, and Shaquila Myers is a Democrat.
