= List of dams and reservoirs in Michigan =

Following is a list of dams and reservoirs in Michigan.

Major dams are linked below. The National Inventory of Dams defines any "major dam" as being 50 feet (15 m) tall with a storage capacity of at least 5,000 acre-feet (6,200,000 m^{3}), or of any height with a storage capacity of 25,000 acre-feet (31,000,000 m^{3}).

== Dams and reservoirs in Michigan ==
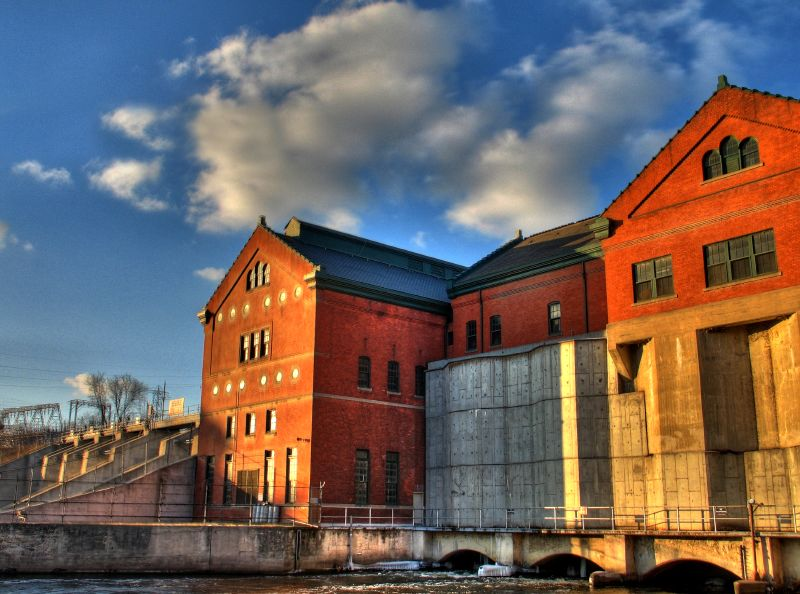
Croton Dam powerhouse

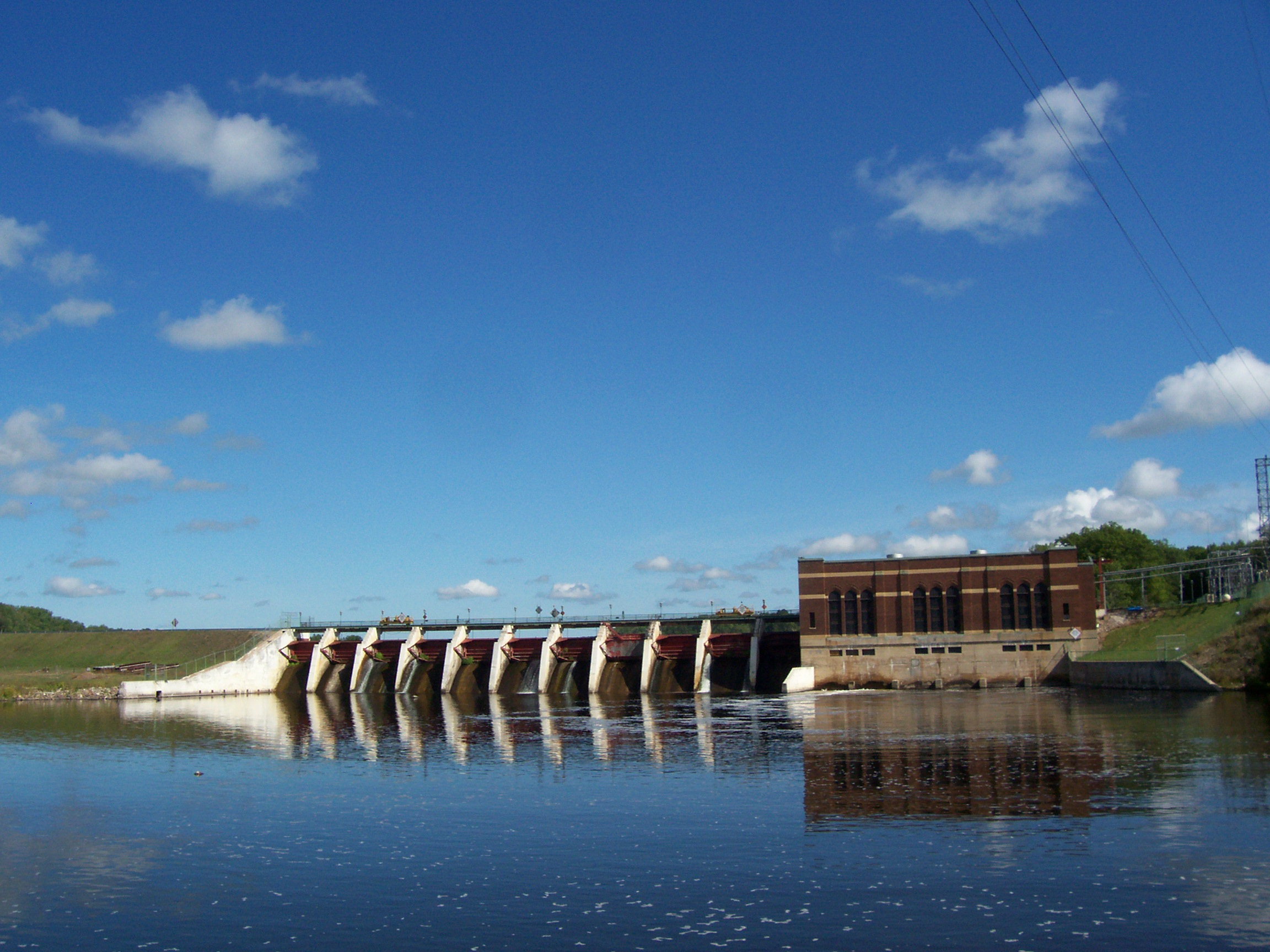
White Rapids Dam, Menominee River

This list is incomplete. You can help Wikipedia by expanding it.

- Alcona Dam, Alcona Dam Pond, Consumers Energy
- Beaverton Dam, Ross Lake (Tobacco River), City of Beaverton
- Big Quinnesec Dam, unnamed reservoir on the Menominee River, Wisconsin Electric Power Company
- Cleveland-Cliffs Basin, AU Train River
- Cooke Dam, Cooke Dam Pond, Consumers Energy
- Croton Dam, Croton Dam Pond, Consumers Energy
- Crystal Falls Dam and Power Plant, unnamed reservoir on the Paint River, City of Crystal Falls
- Edenville Dam, Lake Wixom on Tittabawassee River, Gladwin County, Hydro Power
- Edison Sault Power Canal, St. Marys River (Michigan–Ontario), Lake Superior
- Five Channels Dam, Five Channels Dam Pond, Consumers Energy
- Fletcher Pond, Thunder Bay River
- Foote Dam, Foote Dam Pond, Consumers Energy
- Ford Dam, Black River
- Ford Lake Dam, Ford Lake (Huron River)
- French Landing Dam and Powerhouse, Belleville Lake, Weisenberger Mills
- Greenwood Reservoir
- Hardy Dam, Hardy Dam Pond, Consumers Energy
- Hemlock Falls Dam, unnamed reservoir on the Michigamme River, Wisconsin Electric Power Company
- Irving Dam, unnamed reservoir on the Thornapple River, Consumers Energy
- Kent Lake Dam, Kent Lake, Huron River, Huron-Clinton Metropolitan Authority
- Lake Isabella Dam, Lake Isabella, Chippewa River, Village of Lake Isabella
- Ludington Pumped Storage Power Plant, pumped storage reservoir, Consumers Energy and Detroit Edison
- Michigamme Falls Dam, Michigamme Lake, Wisconsin Electric Power Company
- Mio Dam, Mio Dam Pond, Consumers Energy
- Norway Point Dam, Lake Winyah, Alpena Power Company
- Peavy Falls, Peavy Pond, Wisconsin Electric Power Company
- Redridge Steel Dam, unnamed reservoir on the Salmon Trout River, Stanton Township
- Rogers Dam, Rogers Dam Pond, Consumers Energy
- Sanford Dam, Sanford Lake on Tittabawassee River, Midland County, Hydro Power
- Secord Dam, Secord Lake on Tittabawassee River, Gladwin County, Hydro Power
- Silver Lake Dam, Silver Lake Basin, Upper Peninsula Power Company
- Smallwood Dam, Smallwood Lake on Tittabawassee River, Gladwin County, Hydro Power
- Sturgeon Dam, unnamed reservoir on the Sturgeon River, Wisconsin Electric Power Company
- Tippy Dam, Tippy Dam Pond, Consumers Energy
- Union Street Dam, Boardman Lake on the Boardman River, Grand Traverse County, Traverse City Light and Power
- Way Dam, Michigamme Reservoir, Wisconsin Electric Power Company
- White Rapids, unnamed reservoir on the Menominee River, Wisconsin Electric Power Company
- Tower Dam, Tower Pond, Kleber Dam, Kleber Pond, Black River, Tower-Kleber Limited Partnership
- Leland Dam, Lake Leelanau, Leland Dam Authority
- Elk Rapids Dam, Elk River Chain of Lakes (Elk, Skegemog, Torch Lakes), Elk Rapids Hydropower
- Victoria Dam and Reservoir, Rockland Hydropower

== Smaller dams and reservoirs ==
- Argo Dam, Huron River, City of Ann Arbor
- Barton Dam, Barton Pond, Huron River, City of Ann Arbor
- Flat Rock Dam, Huron River
- Ford Lake, Huron River
- Geddes Dam, Huron River, City of Ann Arbor
- Lake Winyah, Thunder Bay River
- Michigan Center Dam, Grand River, 8 Lakes
- Nankin Dam, Nankin Lake, Wayne County Department of Public Services
- Newburgh Dam, Newburgh Lake, Wayne County Departmentt of Public Services
- Peninsular Paper Dam, Huron River
- Reedsburg Dam, Muskegon River
- Sturgis Dam, St. Joseph River
- Superior Dam, Huron River, Superior Township
