= Au Sable River Canoe Marathon =

Michigan canoe marathon

- Date: last full weekend in July
- Location: Grayling, Michigan to Oscoda, Michigan
- Distance: 120-mile (190 km)
- Established: 1947 (79 years ago)
- Course records: 13:54:09 (2021) Jorden Wakeley/Matt Meersman
- Website: www.ausablecanoemarathon.org

The Au Sable River Canoe Marathon (ARCM), presented by Consumers Energy, (also stylized as the AuSable River Canoe Marathon) is an annual 120 mi (193 km) canoe race in Michigan from Grayling to Oscoda. Nicknamed and known simply as "The Marathon," it first ran in 1947, and is perhaps the oldest marathon canoe race in the United States, and is the longest, non-stop, canoe-only race in North America. The race has been billed as "The World's Toughest Spectator Race" as many of the spectators follow the racers overnight down the full 120 miles (190 km) to the finish. Former Grayling resident Jim Harrison wrote an article in Sports Illustrated in 1973 in which he referred to the race as “a night of unmitigated punishment.”

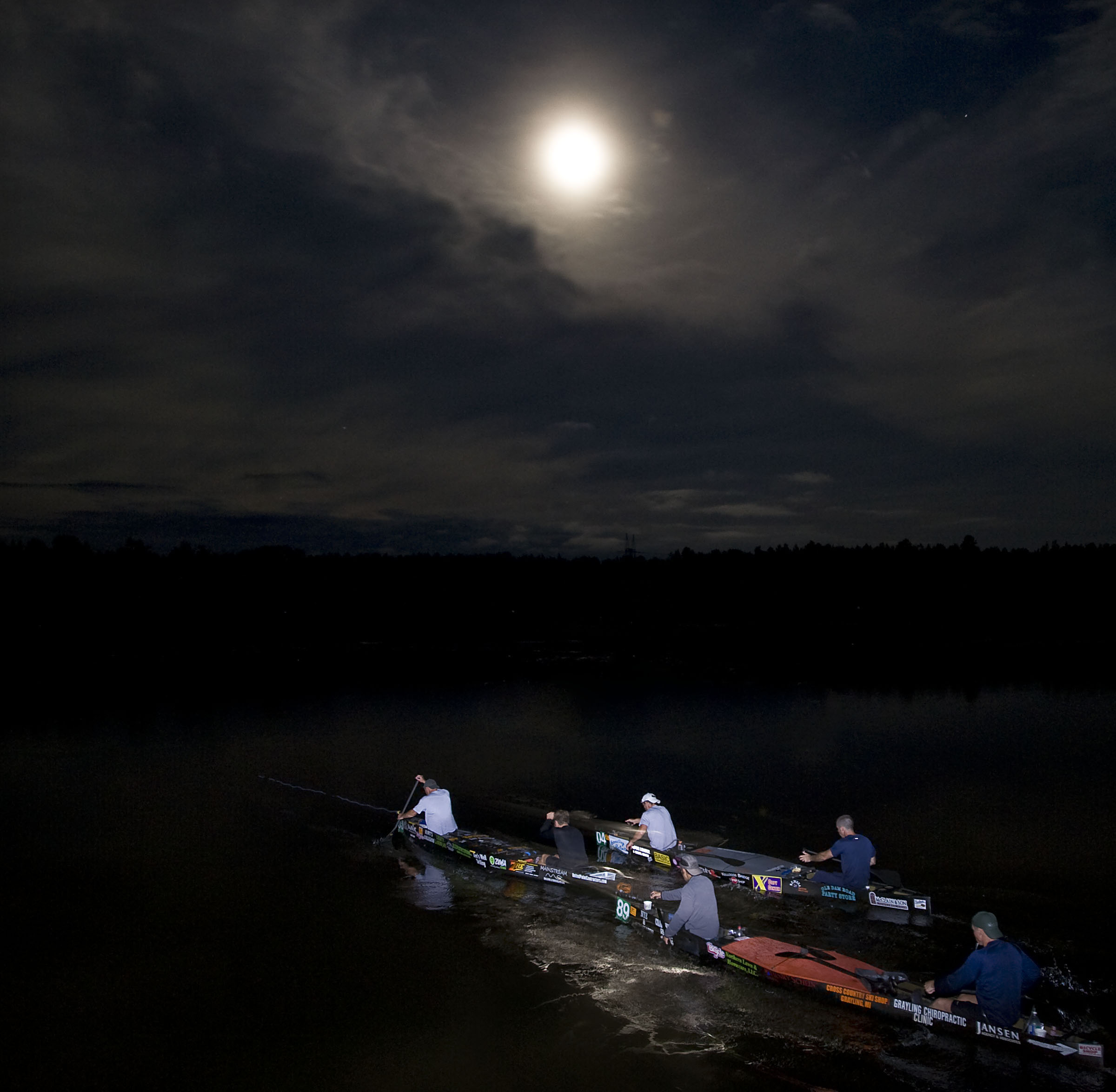
Au Sable River Canoe Marathon by Mark Bialek

== Race format ==
The original idea for the race was to attract tourists after Labor Day. From 1947 to 1960 the race was held in August/September with start times of midnight, early afternoon and 9-10pm. Prior to 1968, teams left at timed intervals. Major sponsor Grayling Chamber of Commerce withdrew their support in 1961 and the race began at the Camp 10 bridge in the morning and ended at Lake Huron. For most of the following seven years, all teams began on Saturday morning in Grayling, stopped for the night in Mio, with pro teams resuming the race Sunday morning from Mio to Oscoda. Amateur teams got a head start at Five Channels Dam. The LeMans start was instituted in 1968, now an iconic part of the race. The non-stop race returned for good in 1970, held on the July 4th weekend. The following year, the race was moved to the last weekend in July. The starting time was moved from 10pm to 9pm during the 1980s, as was the day, from Friday night to Saturday night. The format has remained constant since then.

== Race details ==
To determine the starting position of the racers for the night of the Canoe Marathon, there is a sprint held to determine which of the teams is fastest or slowest. The sprint trials are held at Penrod's Canoe Livery. The trials are held the Wednesday, Thursday, and Friday before the race on Saturday. Each team will head upstream one quarter mile towards the Old AuSable Fly Shop. Once there you must complete a counter clockwise turn around a buoy. Then you must head back downstream to the starting point and the next team does not start until the team finishing reaches a point close to the start buoy. On average this can take from 2 minutes and 15 seconds to 5 minutes. The overall finish times range from about 4 minutes and 30 seconds to 13 minutes. While they are on their way back to the starting buoy they must maintain the number of buoys on the left side of their canoe. Once all of the teams have finished the sprint trials they will be lined up in groups of five, from fastest to slowest, on the night of the Marathon, to make the 910 ft (277 m) LeMans-style foot race that starts the race.

The Marathon starts at 9:00 P.M. in Grayling in a LeMans-style start where the competitors carry their canoes in a footrace four-blocks through town to the Au Sable River entry point. Upon reaching the Au Sable River, they begin paddling non-stop throughout the night. In addition to paddling for 14–19 hours non-stop overnight, competitors must also make portages around six hydroelectric dams along the river race route.

To participate in the race the competitor must be at least the age of 15. In order to enter by July 1 there is a $220 fee. To enter by July 15, the fee is $320, and to enter by July 25 the fee is $420. However, the fees are all worth their prices because upon completing the race the canoers are awarded cash prizes. Even if a racer finishes in 40th place, they will receive more than their entry fee. Competitors that finish after 40th place will receive a finishers medal.

The race relies on the efforts made by many volunteers, and is organized and ran by an all-volunteer non-profit organization: AuSable River International Canoe Marathon, Inc.

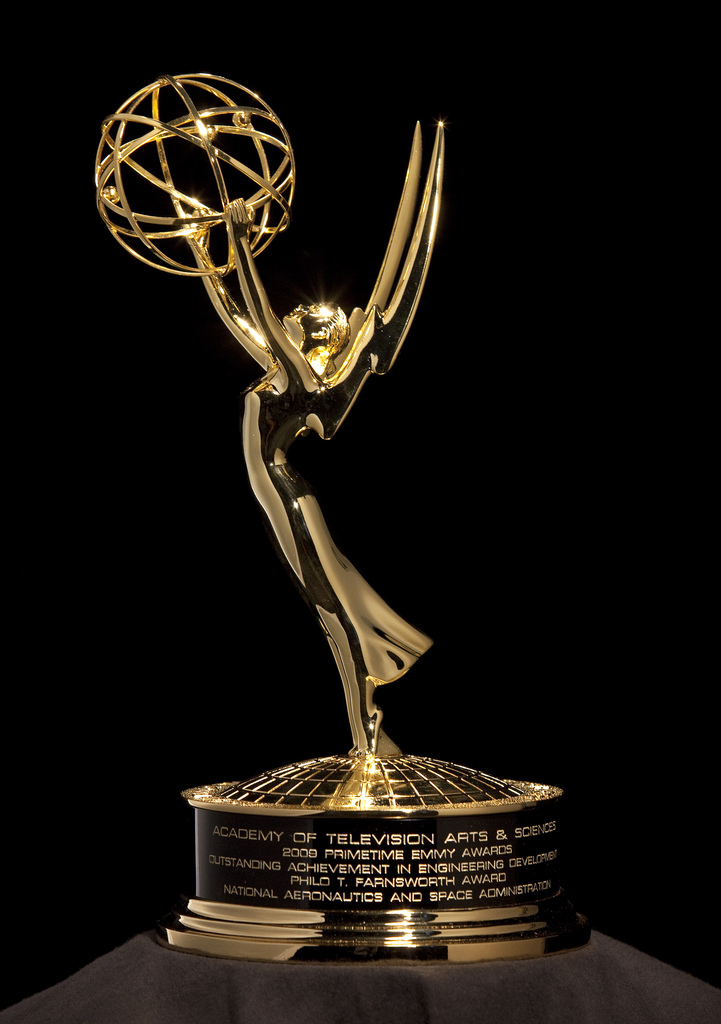
Emmy Award Statue

== Docuseries ==
A three-part documentary entitled, Au Sable was released in 2024 on YouTube and aired on local public-access TV stations. It was subtitled, "The River. The Race. The Legends." Narrated by George Blaha, voice of the Detroit Pistons and Michigan State Spartans, it was created by Justin Garant and Darren Cleavenger-Grimsley, two employees of Consumers Energy, primary sponsor of the ARCM since 2012. The production team from Consumers Energy provided assistance, as did the volunteers from the AuSable River Canoe Marathon staff.

On June 15, 2024, the project won an Emmy Award for Outstanding Sports Documentary from the Michigan chapter of the organization.

== Festival ==
Since 1971, Grayling has held their annual Au Sable River Festival beginning the weekend prior to the race.

AuSable River Festival Events
Friday	Saturday	Sunday	Monday	Tuesday	Wednesday	Thursday	Friday	Saturday	Sunday
Annual Car and Truck show & parade		C-2 challenge race, Grayling to McMaster's Bridge	ARCM Kids Day	Blind Canoe race-Oscoda	Dash for Cash-Oscoda	Cardboard Canoe Race-Oscoda	Arts & Crafts show		Finish celebration-Oscoda
	Pancake breakfast					Greased Watermelon Race-Oscoda	Vendor & Activity booths		
	Sprints to determine starting position						Food Trucks & Vendors		
	C-1 challenge race, Grayling to Burton's Landing				Hurry Up & Paddle H.U.P.	C-1 Express race Grayling to Burton's Landing	Craft brew avenue		
	Blessing of the Paddlers concert					Business relays	Mainstage entertainment		
							ARCM 120 challenge	Lumberjack breakfast	
							Steak-out dinner	AuSable River Festival 5K/10K	
							ARCM Special Olympics Challenge	Corn Hole & Horseshoe tournaments	
					ARCM Time Trials			Miss AuSable River Festival pageant & parade	

Map of Au Sable River Canoe Marathon

== The Triple Crown of Canoe Racing ==
The Au Sable River Canoe Marathon is one of the three marathon canoe races comprising the Triple Crown of Canoe Racing which recognizes the top performances by Marathon Canoe Racers who compete at all three of North America's most prestigious marathon canoe races:

- General Clinton Canoe Regatta, staged Memorial Day on New York's Susquehanna River - a one-day, non-stop 70-mile (110 km) non-stop race from Cooperstown, home of the Baseball Hall of Fame, to Bainbridge, New York.
- Au Sable River Canoe Marathon, one of North America's toughest, richest canoe races, an overnight, non-stop 120-mile (190 km) race from Grayling to Oscoda on Northern Michigan's AuSable River during the last full weekend of July.
- La Classique International de Canots de La Maurice, staged Labor Day weekend on central Quebec's majestic Saint-Maurice River - a three-day, three-stage 120-mile (190 km) race from La Tuque to Trois-Rivieres, Quebec.

== Prizes ==
With 2024 prizes exceeding $55,000, ARCM is the richest canoe race in North America. The team that breaks the existing record of 13:54:09 will win a cash bonus of $1,300.

Cash Awards
1st	2nd	3rd	4th	5th	6th	7th	8th	9th	10th	11th	12th	13th	14th	15th	16th	17th	18th	19th	20th
$6,000	$4,000	$2,900	$2,300	$1,700	$1,500	$1,400	$1,300	$1,200	$1,100	$1,050	$1,000	$950	$900	$850	$800	$750	$700	$650	$600

21st	22nd	23rd	24th	25th	26th	27th	28th	29th	30th	31st	32nd	33rd	34th	35th	36th	37th	38th	39th	40th
$580	$560	$540	$520	$500	$480	$460	$440	$420	$400	$380	$360	$340	$320	$300	$290	$280	$270	$260	$250

Bonus Awards
Name	Composition	1st	2nd	3rd
Women's	Two female paddlers	$350	$200	$150
Mixed	One male, one female paddler	$350	$200	$150
Rookie	First marathon, both paddlers	$250	$150	$100
All-Michigan	Michigan residents, both paddlers	$250	$150	$100
Masters	40+ years old, both paddlers	$250	$150	$100
Seniors	50+ years old, both paddlers	$250	$150	$100
Veterans	60+ years old, both paddlers	$250	$150	$100
Youth/Adult	One teenager, one 35+ years old	$250	$150	$100

- Seniors and Veterans don't qualify for the Master's bonus, and Veterans don't qualify for the Senior's bonus
- The team with the fastest split time for each of the 14 checkpoints wins $50
- The team with the fastest point-to-point time for each of the 14 checkpoints wins $50
- $8,000 in finisher's prizes (not cash) will be awarded to race finishers

== Winners ==
(Since 1980) * = course record

Year	Paddlers	Time
2025	Travis Mecklenburg, Grayling, Michigan / GWeston Willoughby, Traverse City, Michigan	14:17:07
2024	Mike Davis, Grayling, Michigan / Guillaume Blais, Quebec	14:35:26
2023	Steve Lajoie, Mirabel, Quebec / Wesley Dean, Traverse City, Michigan	14:23:06
2022	Steve Lajoie, Mirabel, Quebec / Guillaume Blais, Quebec	14:36:17
2021	Jorden Wakeley, Grayling, Michigan / Matt Meersman, South Bend, Indiana	13:54:09*
2020	Race Cancelled due to COVID-19 Pandemic	
2019	Andrew Triebold, Grayling, Michigan / Steve Lajoie, Mirabel, Quebec	14:15:34
2018	Andrew Triebold, Grayling, Michigan / Steve Lajoie, Mirabel, Quebec	14:17:36
2017	Christophe Proulx, Shawinigan, Quebec / Samuel Frigon, St-Étienne-des-Grès, Quebec	14:18:45
2016	Christophe Proulx, Shawinigan, Quebec / Ryan Halstead, Grayling, Michigan	14:29:26
2015	Andrew Triebold, Grayling, Michigan / Steve Lajoie, Mirabel, Quebec	14:31:56
2014	Andrew Triebold, Grayling, Michigan / Steve Lajoie, Mirabel, Quebec	14:36:18
2013	Andrew Triebold, Grayling, Michigan / Steve Lajoie, Mirabel, Quebec	14:20:24
2012	Andrew Triebold, Grayling, Michigan / Steve Lajoie, Mirabel, Quebec	14:42:43
2011	Andrew Triebold, Grayling, Michigan / Steve Lajoie, Mirabel, Quebec	14:41:00
2010	Andrew Triebold, Spring Arbor, Michigan / Steve Lajoie, Mirabel, Quebec	14:17:29
2009	Andrew Triebold, Spring Arbor, Michigan / Steve Lajoie, Mirabel, Quebec	14:17:42
2008	Andrew Triebold, Spring Arbor, Michigan / Steve Lajoie, Mirabel, Quebec	14:09:06
2007	Andrew Triebold, Spring Arbor, Michigan / Matt Rimer, Grayling, Michigan	14:48:55
2006	Jim Harwood, Grayling, Michigan / Allen Limberg, Wausau, Wisconsin	14:33:50
2005	Serge Corbin, Shawinigan, Quebec / Jeff Kolka, Grayling, Michigan	14:56:11
2004	Andrew Triebold, Spring Arbor, Michigan / Steve Lajoie, Mirabel, Quebec	14:59:46
2003	Serge Corbin, Shawinigan, Quebec / Jeff Kolka, Grayling, Michigan	14:55:03
2002	Serge Corbin, Shawinigan, Quebec / Jeff Kolka, Grayling, Michigan	15:04:56
2001	Serge Corbin, Shawinigan, Quebec / Jeff Kolka, Grayling, Michigan	15:06:48
2000	Serge Corbin, Shawinigan, Quebec / Jeff Kolka, Grayling, Michigan	14:48:00
1999	Serge Corbin, Shawinigan, Quebec / Jeff Kolka, Grayling, Michigan	14:08:18
1998	Serge Corbin, Shawinigan, Quebec / Jeff Kolka, Grayling, Michigan	14:15:47
1997	Serge Corbin, Shawinigan, Quebec / Jeff Kolka, Grayling, Michigan	14:19:36
1996	Serge Corbin, Shawinigan, Quebec / Jeff Kolka, Grayling, Michigan	14:04:05
1995	Jim Harwood, Grayling, Michigan / Patrick Lynch, Shawinigan-Sud, Quebec	14:20:40
1994	Serge Corbin, Shawinigan, Quebec / Solomon Carrière, Cumberland House, Saskatchewan	13:58:08
1993	Serge Corbin, Shawinigan, Quebec / Solomon Carrière, Cumberland House, Saskatchewan	14:23:03
1992	Serge Corbin, Shawinigan, Quebec / Brett Stockton, Grayling, Michigan	14:33:30
1991	Serge Corbin, Shawinigan, Quebec / Brett Stockton, Grayling, Michigan	14:33:30
1990	Serge Corbin, Shawinigan, Quebec / Brett Stockton, Grayling, Michigan	14:43:35
1989	Al Rudquist, Grand Rapids, Minnesota / Randy Drake, Virginia Beach, Virginia	14:38:18
1988	Serge Corbin, Shawinigan, Quebec / Brett Stockton, Grayling, Michigan	14:20:00
1987	Serge Corbin, Shawinigan, Quebec / Brett Stockton, Grayling, Michigan	14:34:32
1986	Butch Stockton, Higgins Lake, Michigan / Brett Stockton, Grayling, Michigan	14:30:38
1985	Butch Stockton, Higgins Lake, Michigan / Brett Stockton, Grayling, Michigan	14:35:53
1984	Butch Stockton, Higgins Lake, Michigan / Solomon Carrière, Cumberland House, Saskatchewan	14:20:40
1983	Butch Stockton, Higgins Lake, Michigan / Brett Stockton, Grayling, Michigan	14:38:36
1982	Butch Stockton, Higgins Lake, Michigan / Brett Stockton, Grayling, Michigan	14:38:27
1981	John Baker, Grayling, Michigan / Ken Brown, St. Clair Shores, Michigan	14:29:01
1980	John Baker, Grayling, Michigan / Ron Williams, Smither, British Columbia	14:48:31

This is the finish of the 2005 AuSable River Canoe Marathon - the closest finish in the history of The Marathon. After nearly 15 hours, more than 50,000 paddle strokes and racing overnight 120 miles on the AuSable River from Grayling to Oscoda, Michigan -- Serge Corbin & Jeff Kolka edged Andy Triebold & Matt Rimer in a sprint to the Finish Line by 1 second, finishing in 14:56:11 (14 hours, 56 minutes, 11 seconds).

The race record for the current course is 13:54:09, set by Jorden Wakeley of Grayling, MI and Matt Meersman of South Bend, IN in 2021.

The record for most wins individually is 18 by Serge Corbin (1977 and 1979 w/ Claude Corbin; 1987–1988, 1990-1992 w/ Brett Stockton; 1994-1995 w/ Solomon Carriere; 1996–2003, 2005 w/ Jeff Kolka).

The record for most wins by a team is 10 by Andrew Triebold and Steve Lajoie (2004 and 2008–2015, 2018)

== See also ==
- Au Sable River
- Grayling, Michigan
- Mio, Michigan
- Curtis Township, Michigan
- Au Sable, Michigan
- Oscoda, Michigan
- Alcona Dam
- Five Channels Dam
- Cooke Dam
- Foote Dam
