= Mio Dam =

- Mio Dam Tailwater 2020

- Location within the state of Michigan
- Location: Mio, Oscoda County, Michigan
- Coordinates: 44.661143°N 84.131697°W
- Opening date: 1916
- Owner: Consumers Energy

Dam and spillways
- Type of dam: Embankment
- Spillways: 1

Power Station
- Turbines: Allis Chalmers
- Installed capacity: 4.96 MW

Mio Dam is a hydroelectric dam located on the Au Sable River in Michigan capable of generating 4.96 MW of electric power. It was the 4th of 6 dams built by Consumers Power between 1906 and 1924 along the Au Sable River and is the furthest upstream of the six. The dam was completed in 1916. The Mio Hydroelectric Plant consists of an embankment on each side connected by a spillway. Located North of the spillway is the powerhouse and outdoor substation. Public access to Mio Pond is provided via a boat ramp maintained by Consumers Energy, and portage facilities are also provided allowing canoes and kayaks access to bypass the dam. Portage the dam on the right using the cement stairs then carry down a gravel road with a canoe slide on the down river side of the dam.

== Recognition and significance ==
=== Michigan Historic Site ===
In 2005 the Mio Dam was named as a Michigan Historic Site because it was the first hydro to route excess river flow through conduits built into the foundation of the powerhouse (known as under-sluce) rather than the typical costly above-ground gated spillway. Nevertheless, in 1988 the dam was modified to meet then-current federal dam safety standards requiring an additional above-ground concrete spillway be added.

=== Hydro Hall of Fame ===
In June 2017, the Mio Dam's was inducted into the Hydro Hall of Fame by HydroVision International, recognizing the ingenuity of its initial design (conduit spillways under the powerhouse foundation) and the over 100 years of value the dam has provided. Its under-slice design was incorporated into other Consumers Power Company hydro dams, including the next dam downriver from Mio and the Alcona Dam, built in 1924.

=== AuSable River Canoe Marathon ===
The Mio dam is one of 6 dams portaged by C-2 (two-person) canoe race teams during the 120-mile long overnight AuSable River Canoe Marathon that is held annually on the last full weekend in July.

== Technical information ==
According to page 113 of the book "The Lower Peninsula of Michigan: An Inventory of Historic Engineering and Industrial Sites" by Charles K Hyde the Mio dam is an earth embankment dam utilizing a reinforced concrete core wall creating a head of 29 feet of water. The original installation is still in operation today including the two Allis-Chalmers vertical turbines and two Allis-Chalmers generators each producing 2,500 KW, 2,500-volts, and operating at 80 R.P.M. The powerhouse is a rectangular flat-roofed brick building measuring 30 ft wide by 75 ft long. The isolated location for the construction of the dam was miles from the closest rail lines in Luzerne thereby complicating the transportation of supplies including concrete, steel, and some machinery weighing over 30 tons which would need to ship by horse-drawn wagons those last miles. Furthermore, the narrow space available in the channel required the use of a then-innovative "conduit spillway" design patented by William W. Tefft who became the Chiel Engineer for Consumers Power Company. This spillway utilized two 60-inch steel tubes to direct the water under the powerhouse. In addition, the dam has one small concrete spillway with a single tainter gate.

Studies showed that some fish species, like Trout, became stressed as water temperatures increased. The current system in place at Mio and other Consumers Energy Dams uses an underwater air bubbler to lift/mix colder lower-lying water to the intake pipes for the turbines. Consumers Energy's operating license requires the water to be 68 degrees. When water temperatures rise, compressors are activated typically for 6 hours a day to mimic evening cooling cycles but have been run as long as 24-hours a day at Mio.

== River flow and safety ==
Consumers Energy, formerly named Consumers Power Company, regularly monitors and review water flows and water temperatures to maintain safe operation of the hydro dams doing a controlled release of excess water when necessary. Additionally, the United States Geological Survey (USGS) maintains 6 real-time water-level gages on the Au Sable River as a part of its National Streamflow Information Program. This information is fed to the National Weather Service's Advanced Hydrologic Prediction Service typically allowing the monitoring and reporting of water levels, flow speed, temperature, and water quality (oxygen) along the river. One of those gauges (ID: MIOM4) is located at the Mio Dam.

"Condition C" is a term used to indicate high flow and a non-emergency, "Condition B" indicates a failure may eventually occur, whereas "Condition A" is where there is dam failure or imminent failure of the dam. Consumers Energy says Condition C is not a regular event on Au Sable River hydro dams. Local emergency management teams regularly train and have coordinated event plans should there ever be a "Condition A" event. In July 2020, the Emergency Management Coordinator for both Oscoda and Alcona counties was reported in the Alpena News newspaper as saying that failure of the Mio Dam could be the worst possible danger to the public because it is expected that a failure of the Mio Dam would cause the subsequent five other dams downriver to fail as well.
