= Au Sable River (Michigan) =

River in Michigan, United States

Au Sable River Beauais River, Rivière au sable
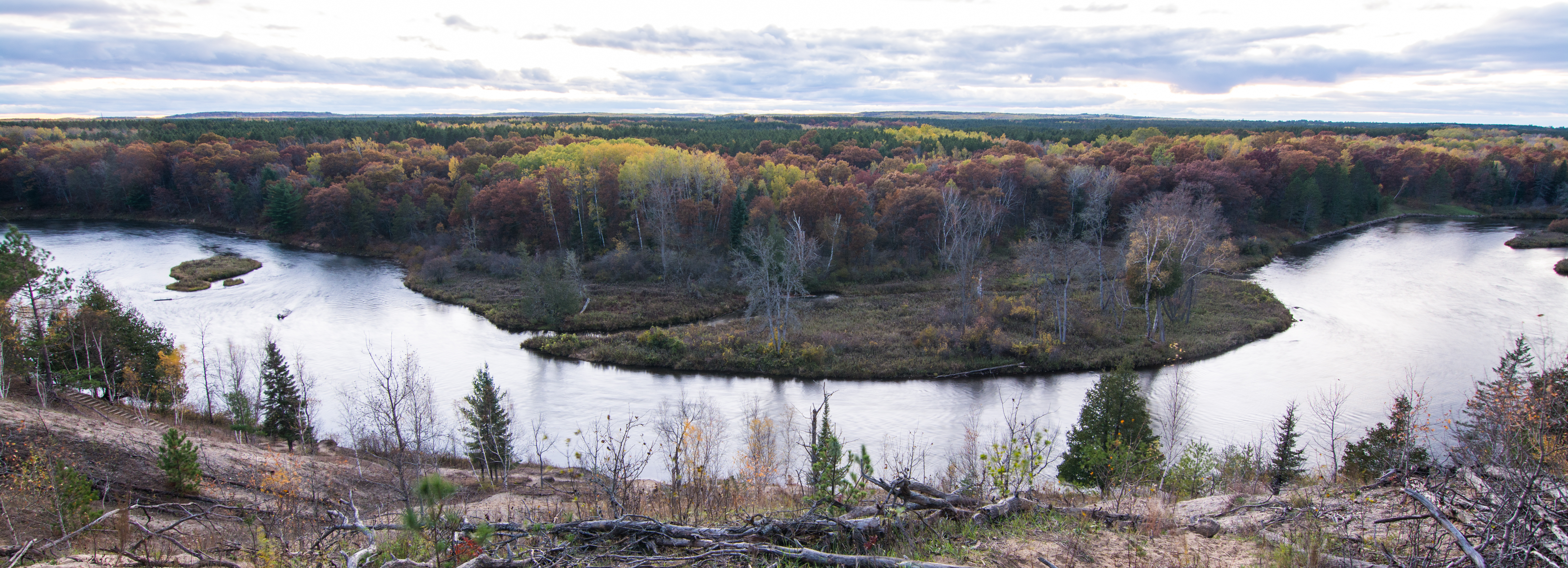
- The Au Sable River in Alcona County

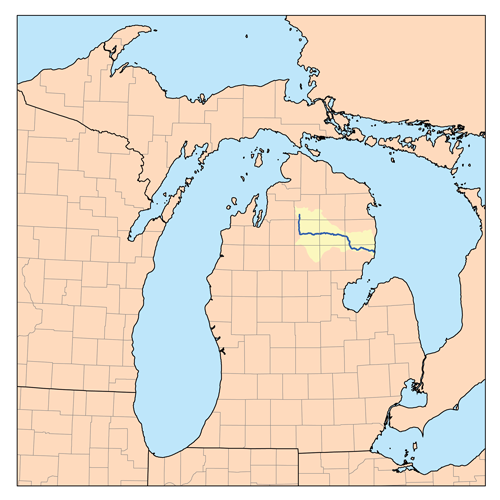
- Location of the Au Sable River

Location
- Country: United States

Physical characteristics
- Source
  - location: Frederic Township, Crawford County, Michigan
- Mouth
  - location: Lake Huron at Au Sable, Michigan
  - elevation: 581 ft (177 m)
- Length: 138 miles (222 km)

National Wild and Scenic River
- Type: Scenic
- Designated: October 4, 1984

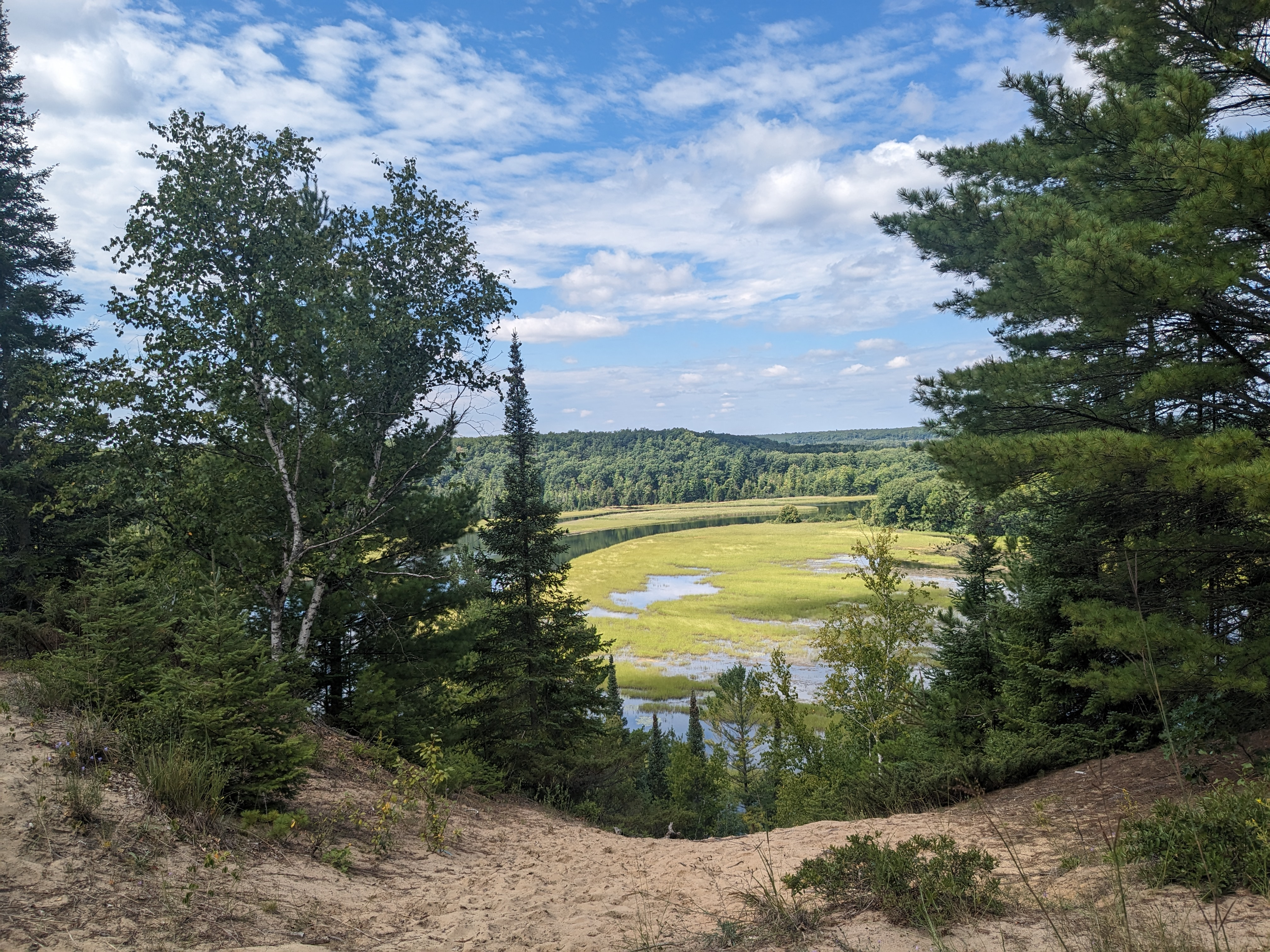
Additional view from bluffs of the Au Sable River in Iosco County, Michigan

The Au Sable River (/ɔː ˈsɑːbəl/ aw SAH-bəl) is a 138-mile-long (222 km) river in the Lower Peninsula of the U.S. state of Michigan. Rising in the Northern Lower Peninsula, the river flows in a generally southeasterly direction to its mouth at Lake Huron at the communities of Au Sable and Oscoda. Like the nearby Manistee River, it is regarded as a premier brown trout fishery east of the Rockies and the Michigan Department of Natural Resources has designated it a blue ribbon trout stream. A map from 1795 located in the United States Gazetteer calls it the Beauais River. In French, the river is called the Rivière au sable, literally "Sand River". Historically used for transporting logs and generating hydroelectric power, the river is now popular for recreation such as canoeing and camping.

== History ==
Locals, including native Americans used the river for hunting, fishing and as an inland link for trapping, trading, and transiting between Lake Michigan and Lake Huron. In the late 1800s, the river was used for transporting logs downstream to sawmills and shipping yards in the towns of AuGres and Oscoda. After logging, hydroelectric dams were built during the 1920s to generate power. Today, recreation is the most popular utilization of the river.

== Description ==
The main stream of the river is formed at 44°48′21″N 84°45′29″W in Frederic Township in Crawford County by the confluence of Kolke and Bradford Creeks, which both rise in Otsego County. The river flows south then turns east through Grayling, where it is joined by the East Branch Au Sable River at 44°39′55″N 84°42′13″W. The East Branch rises in Lovells Township, Crawford County at 44°49′46″N 84°35′59″W.

The Au Sable continues eastward and is joined by the South Branch Au Sable River at 44°39′23″N 84°28′06″W in South Branch Township. The South Branch rises out of Lake St. Helen in Richfield Township, Roscommon County at 44°22′54″N 84°26′38″W and flows northwest into Roscommon then northeast to the main branch of the Au Sable. The North Branch Au Sable River joins within approximately 5 miles (8.0 km) in eastern Crawford County at 44°40′14″N 84°22′51″W near the boundary with Oscoda County. The North Branch rises in Bagley Township, Otsego County, near Lake Otsego.

The Au Sable then flows mostly east through Oscoda County, then south and east through Alcona County and Iosco County. The river's watershed also drains portions of Montmorency County and Ogemaw County.

Most of the main branch of the Au Sable flows through or adjacent to the Huron-Manistee National Forest. 23 miles (37 km) of the river, from the Mio Pond downstream to the Alcona Pond, was designated as a National Wild and Scenic River on October 4, 1984. The watershed provides habitat for bald eagle and the endangered Kirtland's warbler. Five percent of the land in the watershed is National Forest and 29% is state forest.

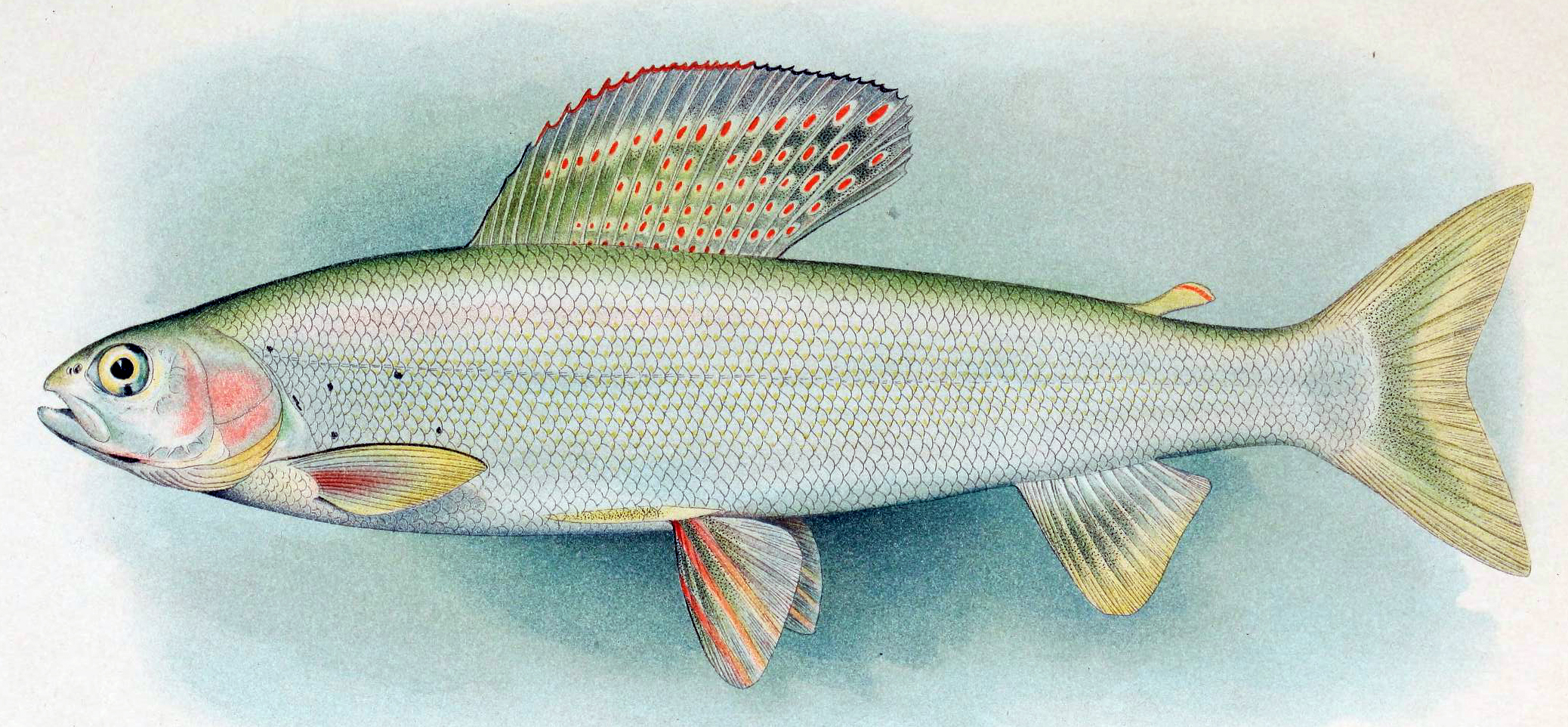
Lumbering practices destroyed Arctic grayling breeding grounds in rivers and contributed to their slow decline and eventual disappearance from Northern Michigan.

== Grayling ==
The grayling species of fish was once abundant in the Au Sable River, although the species has been extirpated in Michigan since 1936. Brook trout were released into the river in the 1880s and proved stronger than the grayling. There have been many attempts to bring the grayling back to the area, but none have been successful. The city of Grayling, Michigan was named after the once plentiful fish. Brown trout is the current main catch.

== Recreation ==
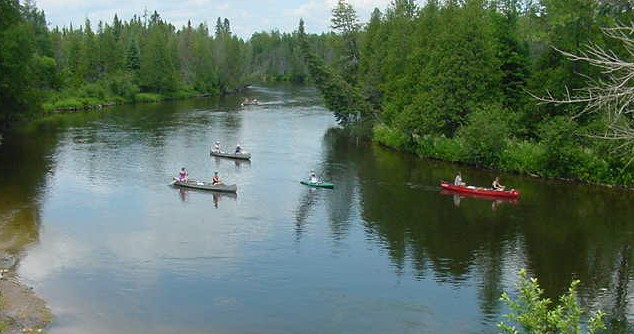
Canoes along the Au Sable River

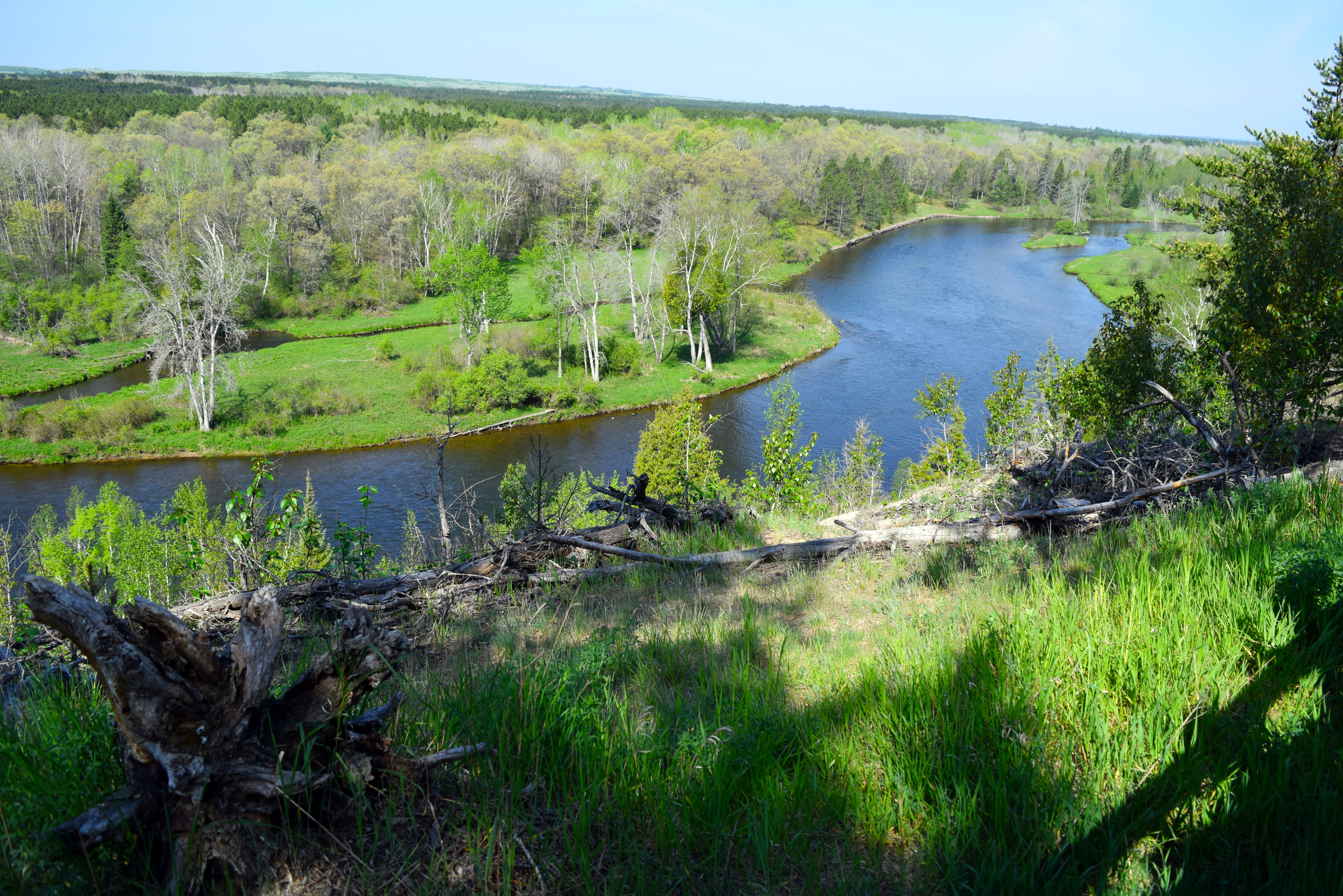
View from bluffs of the Au Sable River

Activities include paddle sports (kayaking and canoeing), fishing, primitive camping, backpacking and hiking. There are several "developed" campgrounds as well as primitive campgrounds. It is a designated trout stream, and many canoe liveries exist along the river, which offer paddling trips from a few hours to as long as a week. Impoundments of five of the six dams on the Au Sable create lakes that are used for power boating, water skiing and sail boating. In addition to brown, rainbow and brook trout in the river, there are perch, muskellunge and walleye, large and smallmouth bass, northern pike and bluegill in the dam ponds. Salmon and steelhead trout are popular during spring and fall spawning migrations.

=== Holy waters ===
The nine-mile section of the Au Sable River main branch from Burtons Landing to Wakeley Bridge is called the Holy Waters due to the frequent insect hatches, abundance of trout, and ease of wading. The section is regulated year-round as catch and release and limited to fly fishing only (no live bait). The river flows through scenic woodlands where the ecosystem supports dozens of species of birds and other wildlife including deer, rabbit, muskrat, otter, mink, fox, squirrel, chipmonk, skunk and turtle.

=== Organizations ===
The Trout Unlimited organization was begun in 1959 by 16 Michigan fishermen on the AuSable River.

- Schrems West Michigan Trout Unlimited is the Au Sable chapter of the national organization.
- Anglers of the Au Sable, with 1200 members, was founded in 1986 "to preserve, protect and enhance the AuSable River system for future generations of fly fishers."
- Au Sable River Property Owners Alliance was organized in the mid-1960s "To preserve, protect and enhance the Au Sable River watershed’s great natural endowments of wilderness scenery, unpolluted cold-water, and stable forest habitat for the enjoyment of future generations."

== Average water temperature ==
Average water temperature
Month	degrees Fahrenheit
January	37
February	36
March	36
April	36
May	37
June	43
July	52
August	61
September	59
October	48
November	43
December	39

== River valley attractions and events ==
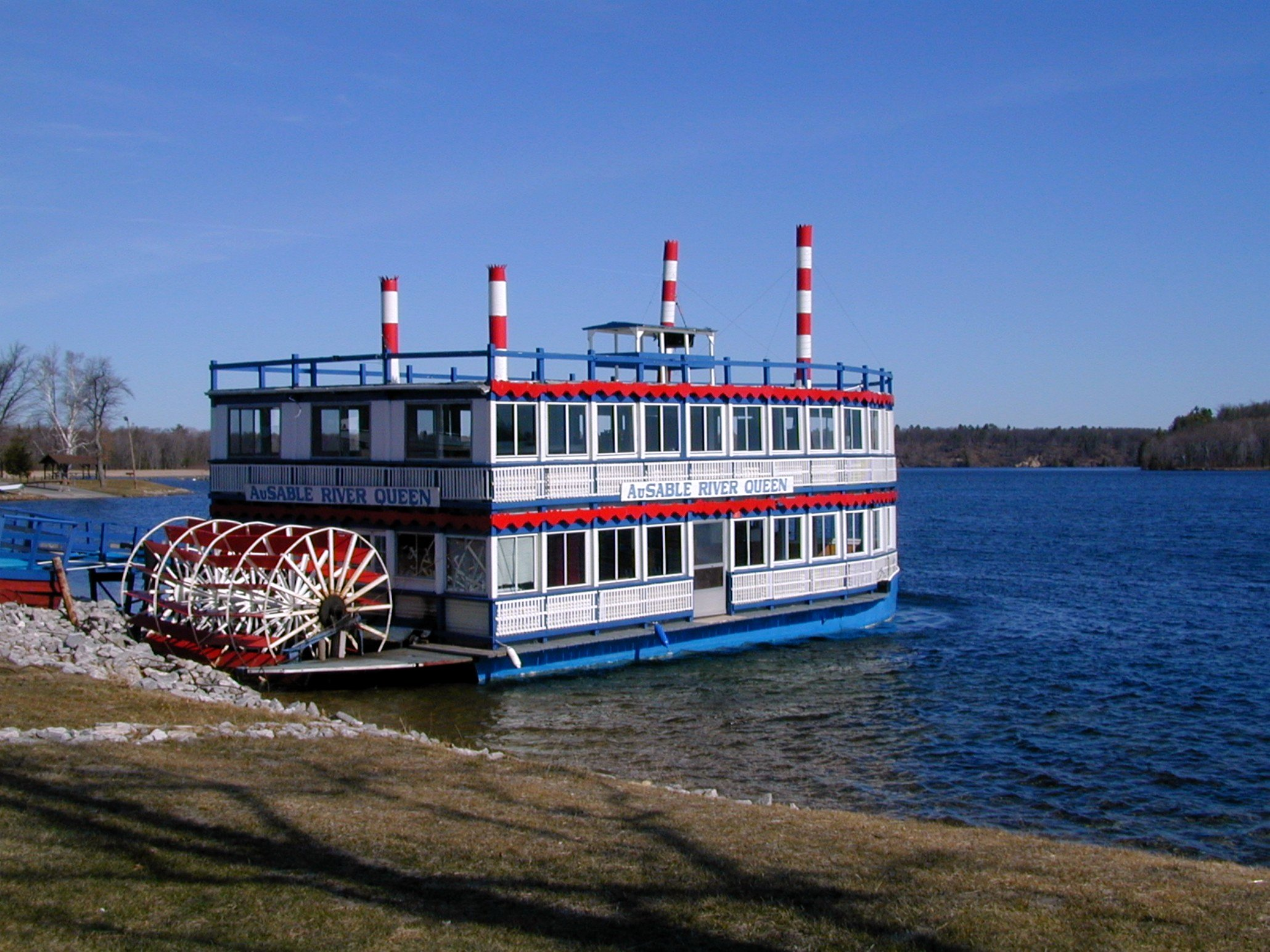
The Au Sable River Queen, the only paddle wheel river boat operating in northern Michigan

Map of Au Sable River Canoe Marathon course

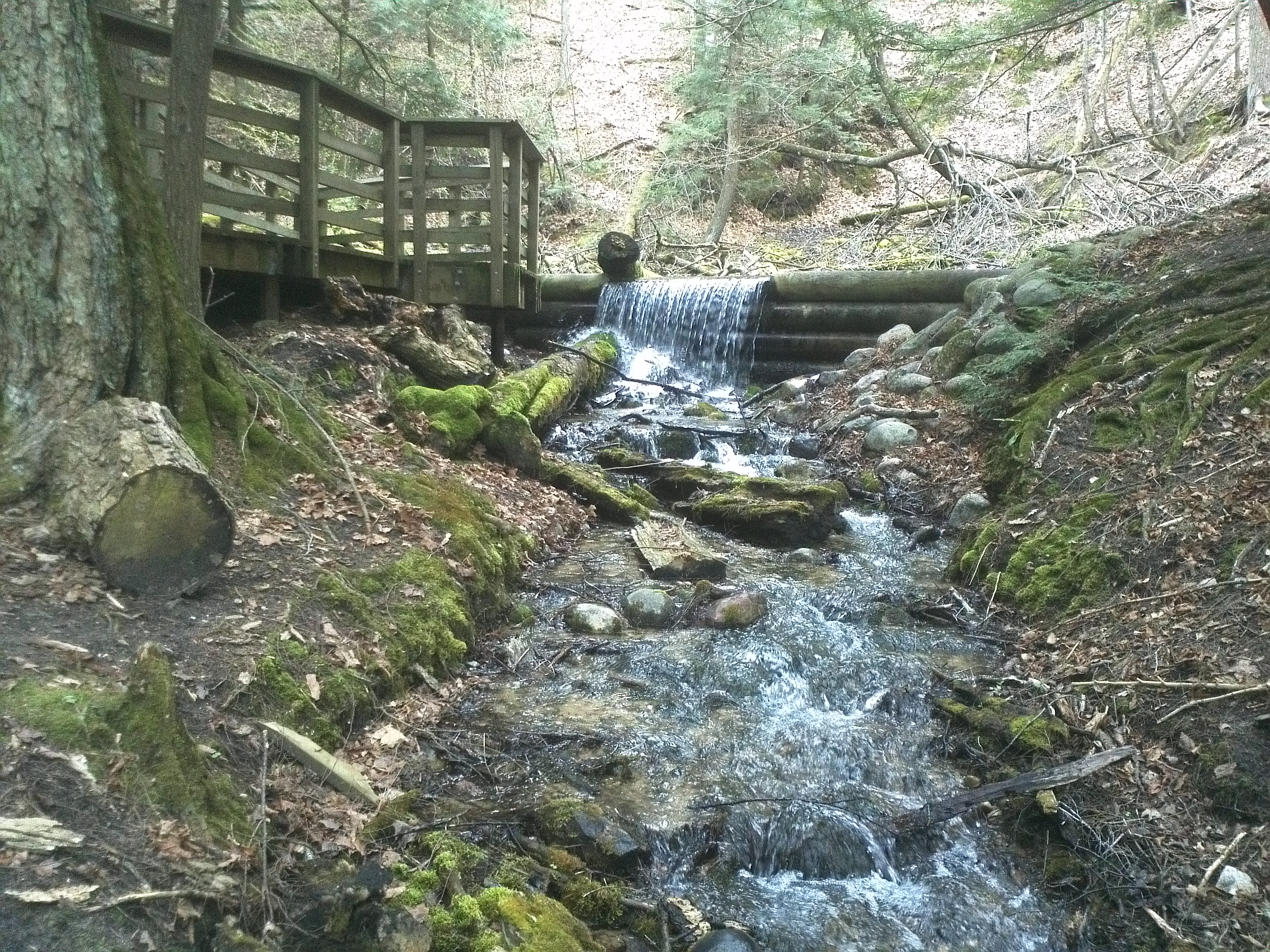
Iargo Springs, Oscoda, Michigan

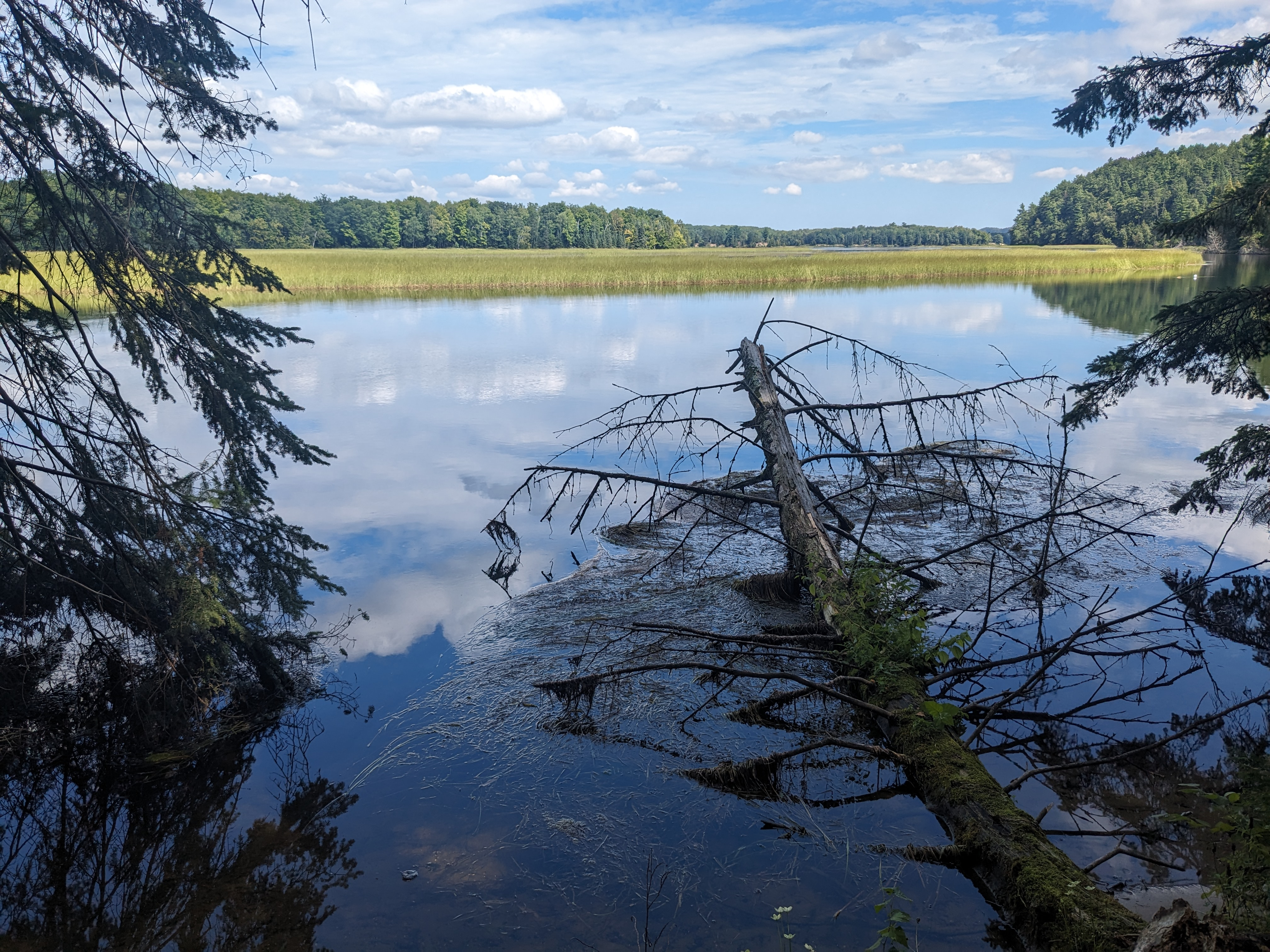
The Au Sable Siver Shoreline near Iargo Springs in Iosco County, Michigan

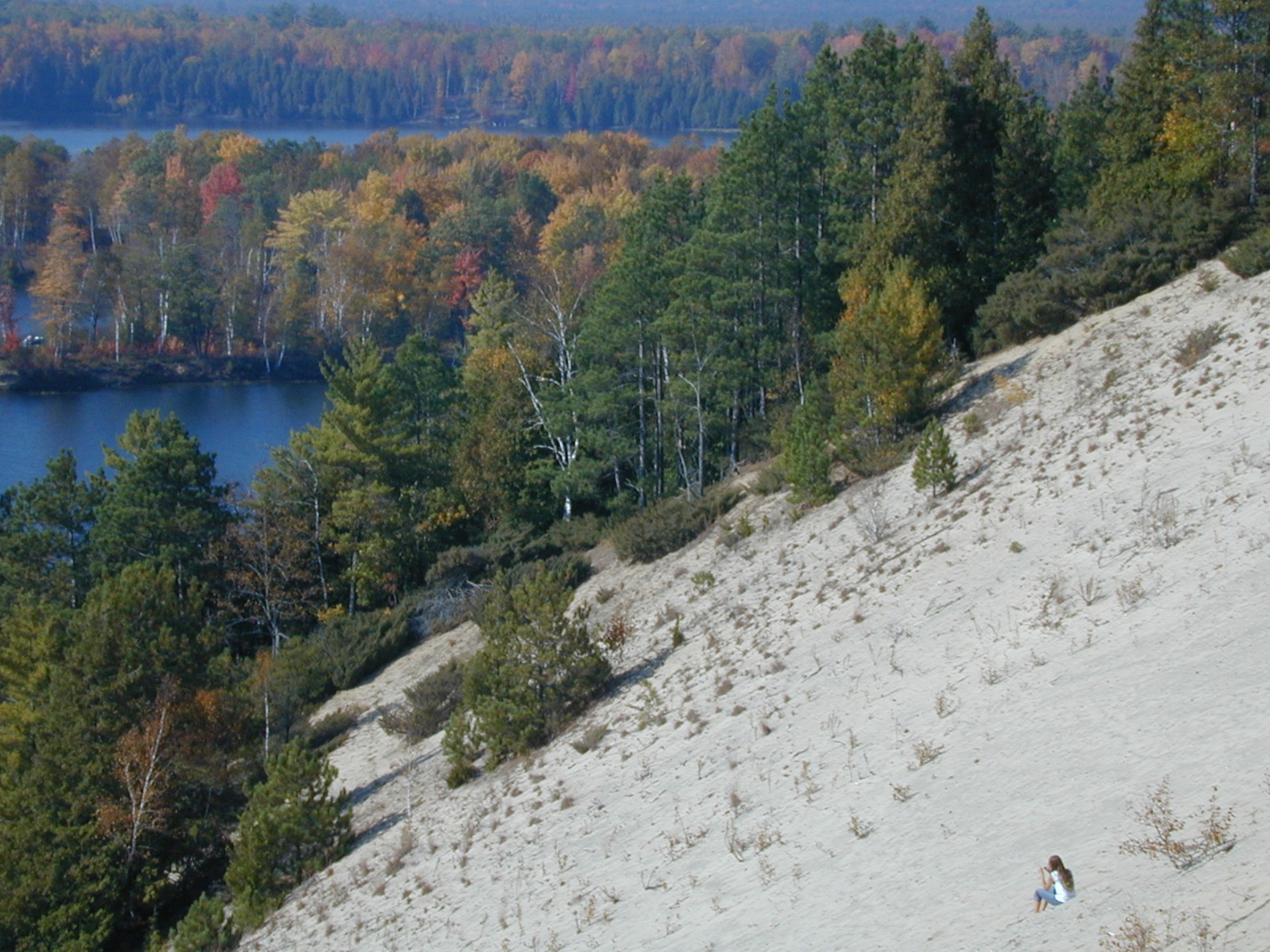
River Road Scenic Byway - Highbanks Sand Dune

- The Michigan AuSable Valley Railroad is located in Fairview. It is a 1/4 scale, 16 in (406 mm) gauge ridable miniature railway, which offers rides on a passenger train through the scenic Northern Michigan landscape. It operates in jack pine country during the summer months. Riders travel through parts of the Huron National Forest and overlook the Comins Creek Valley.
- The Au Sable River Canoe Marathon starts in Grayling and ends in Oscoda 120 miles (190 km) down the river. It is one of three annual marathon races that constitute canoe racing's Triple Crown. The race begins at 9:00p.m. on the last Saturday in July and runs through the night into the next day. Winning times have ranged from 14 to 21 hours. The race was first run in 1947.
- First Dam Canoe Race (MCRA—Canoe Race) is a yearly event.
- The Au Sable River Queen is a paddle boat that offers river excursions six miles west of Oscoda on the River Road Scenic Byway.
- Within this area is Kirtland's warbler habitat, established to bring the songbird back from near extinction.
- The Lumberman's Monument is adjacent to the river, about 15 miles (24 km) west of Oscoda. The 14-foot bronze monument stands on a high bank with the Au Sable River providing a scenic backdrop since 1932. Lumbering along the river began in the 1860s and was finished by the 1910s.
- River Road, on the north bank and running parallel to the river, is a designated National Scenic Byway for the 23 miles that go into Oscoda.
- There are six dams and hydro-electric plants in the basin of the Au Sable, with a total capacity of 41MW and an average annual output of 500 GJ. The six facilities were constructed between 1911 and 1924.
- The Grayling Fish Hatchery on the Au Sable was founded in 1914 by timber baron Rasmus Hanson with assistance from Henry & Edsel Ford. Although unsuccessful in restoring the grayling, the hatchery raised and released millions of rainbow and brown trout. The State of Michigan purchased it in 1926, then the Michigan Department of Natural Resources, finally to the non-profit Grayling Hatchery Incorporated in 2017.
- Canoer's Memorial: The inscription on the memorial says "The crossed paddles are a canoeist’s salute. These paddles are erected as a tribute to those professional members of the Michigan Canoe Racing Association who were once active in the promotion and participation of canoe racing in Michigan. As you view the waters of the AuSable or watch canoes racing on our Michigan streams, remember these departed members and their dedication to the sport of canoe racing.” The first casualty happened in 1953 claiming the life of 17-year-old Jerry Curley. The Curley family spearheaded the efforts to erect the monument, and it is now maintained by Oscoda Township on U.S. Forest Service property.
- The Wolf Creek Trail system is a beautiful trail and boardwalk along the Au Sable River and around Wolf Creek. This trail does not have any mandatory fees for use making it free for everyone. The non-motorized trail is open to all hikers, mountain bikers, cross country skiers, snowshoers, with loops designed as long as 4.2 miles and as short as 1.8 miles. The Wolf Creek Trail, part of the Huron National Forest, has four separate loops with a total of 4.8 miles of walking paths with 3 of these miles running adjacent to the Au Sable River. This trail system is a popular hiking, walking, and cross-country skiing spot for locals and tourists alike. Many hikers will use the main trailhead at the bustling Department of Natural Resources canoe launch and park, right off of M-72/33 on the east side of the bridge that crosses the Au Sable River. The park also has toilets, picnic tables, grills, a source for drinking water, and plenty of parking. Most cross-country skiers will use the trailhead off of South River Road approximately 2 miles east of Mio. Skiers will encounter a few downhill slopes, but nothing too difficult, making for an overall easy ski trail.
- Iargo Springs are natural springs near Oscoda that flow for nearly 1000 feet to the Au Sable River. Boardwalks provide scenic views of waterfalls and ponds.
- The River Road National Scenic Byway runs 23 1/2-mile-long (37.8 km) parallel to the Au Sable River.

=== Docuseries ===
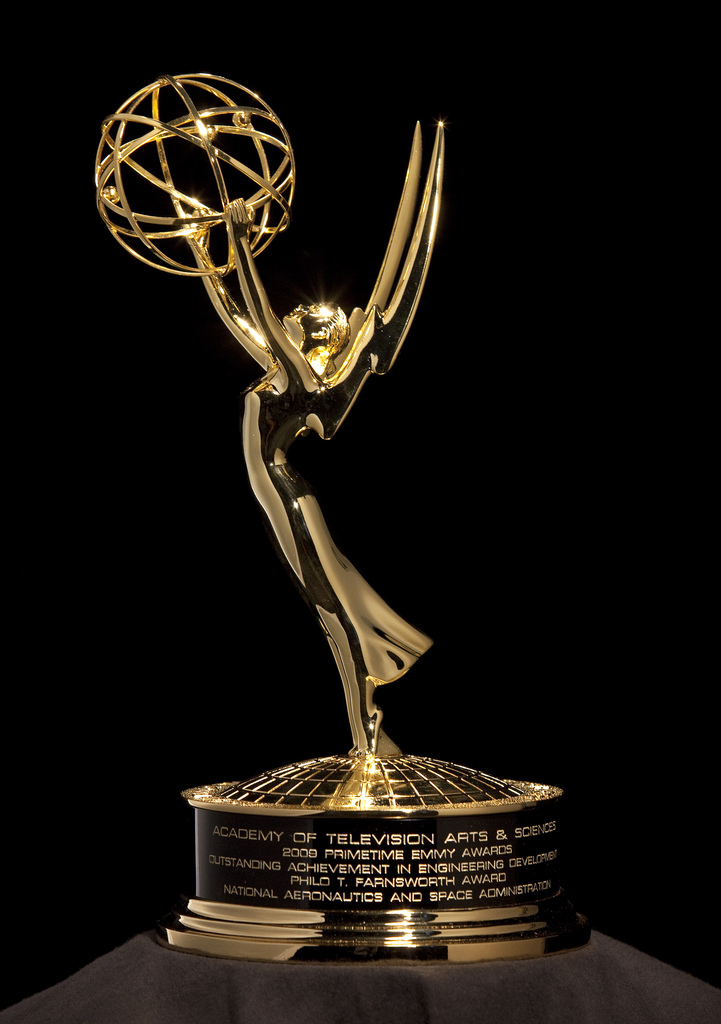
Emmy Award Statue

A three-part documentary entitled Au Sable was released in 2024 on YouTube and aired on local public-access TV stations. It was subtitled, "The River. The Race. The Legends." Narrated by George Blaha, voice of the Detroit Pistons and Michigan State Spartans, it was created by Justin Garant and Darren Cleavenger-Grimsley, two employees of Consumers Energy, primary sponsor of the ARCM since 2012. The Production Team from Consumers Energy provided assistance, as did the volunteers from the AuSable River Canoe Marathon staff.

On June 15, 2024, the project won an Emmy Award for Outstanding Sports Documentary from the Michigan chapter of the organization.

== Drainage basin ==
The Au Sable has a drainage basin of 1,932 square miles (5,000 km^{2}) and an average flow of 1,100 ft^{3}/s (31 m^{3}/s) at its mouth. The river drops 650 feet (200 m) from its source at the junction of the Bradford and Kolka Creeks and drains land in the following counties:

- Antrim County
- Crawford County
- Grand Traverse County
- Montmorency County
- Osceola County
- Missaukee County
- Otsego County
- Roscommon County

== Towns along river ==
- Arbutus Beach, Michigan
- Au Sable, Michigan
- Curtisville, Michigan
- Glennie, Michigan
- Grayling, Michigan
- Lewiston, Michigan
- Lovells, Michigan
- Mio, Michigan
- Oscoda, Michigan
- Roscommon, Michigan

== River dams ==
The Five Channels Dam viewed from M-65

Ordered from upriver to downriver, all belonging to the power company Consumers Energy:

1. Mio Dam
2. Alcona Dam
3. Loud Dam
4. Five Channels Dam
5. Cooke Dam
6. Foote Dam

== Historical markers ==
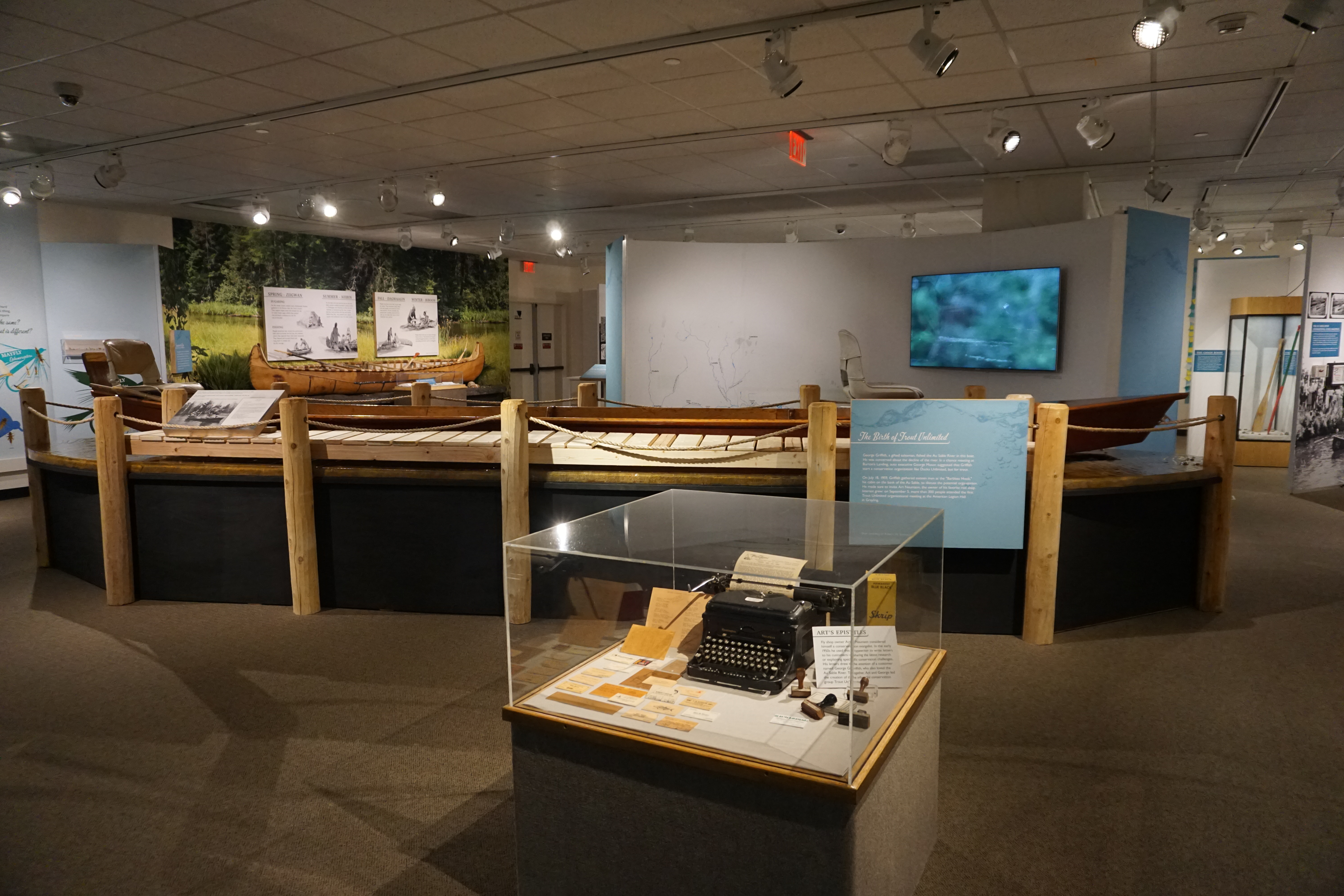
The River That Changed the World exhibit, on the Au Sable River, at the Michigan History Museum

The river has five historical markers on it:

- Cooke Hydroelectric Plant
- Five Channels Dam Workers Camp
- The Louis Chevalier Claim
- Mio Hydroelectric Plant
- Chief Shoppenagon

== River access ==
A Michigan Recreation Passport is required for motor vehicles to access state parks, recreation areas, boating access, campgrounds and trails. Parks and recreation areas are mostly self-supporting, and the Recreation Passport is separate from camping, lodging, harbor and shelter fees.

The Michigan Department of Natural Resources (MDNR) maintains over 20 Public Access Sites on the Au Sable River for fishing and boating egress and ingress. Many have vault toilets and Hand pumps for potable water. Some allow camping but all require a current Recreation Passport. The United States Forest Service (USFS) maintains numerous camping and public access sites in the Huron-Manistee National Forests. All dams on the AuSable River are owned and operated by Consumers Energy (CE).

List of Public Access and Camping locations
Name	Paddling (hours) from Grayling	Miles from Grayling	GPS Coord	Camping	Restrooms	Potable water	Recreation Pass- port required	Owner
Grayling Public Access	0:00	0.0	44.6597°N 84.7115°W		Y	Y		Grayling
AuSable River State Forest Campground and Canoe Camp	2:00	7.0	44.6656°N 84.6547°W	Y	Y	Y	Y	MDNR
Burtons Landing	2:30	6.3	44.6625°N 84.6472°W	Y	Y	Y	Y	MDNR
Louies Landing	2:45		44.6654°N 84.6375°W				Y	MDNR
Keystone Landing	3:00		44.6650°N 84.6252°W	Y	Y	Y		MDNR
Thendara Road	3:30	11.0	44.6695°N 84.6067°W					MDNR
Whirlpool Angler Access	3:45	12.0	44.6667°N 84.6170°W				Y	USFS
Stephan Landing	4:00	13.0	44.6788°N 84.5734°W		Y		Y	MDNR
Wakeley Landing	5:30	15.8	44.6579°N 84.5074°W					Crawford Co.
White Pine Campground (no vehicles)	6:30		44.6566°N 84.4754°W	Y	Y	Y	Y	MDNR
Conners Flats Access	7:00		44.6687°N 84.4389°W		Y		Y	MDNR
Rainbow Bend State Forest	7:30		44.6705°N 84.4185°W	Y	Y	Y	Y	MDNR
McMaster Bridge Landing	8:30	24.2	44.6648°N 84.3969°W		Y		Y	MDNR
Parmalee Bridge Landing and State Forest	11:00	33.7	44.6774°N 84.2926°W	Y	Y	Y	Y	MDNR
Camp 10 Bridge Landing	15:00	42.9	44.6690°N 84.1871°W				Y	USFS
Mio Dam landing and State Forest	17:00	45.7	44.6633°N 84.1458°W	Y	Y	Y	Y	MDNR
Pine Acres Campground & Cabins Boat Launch			44.4548°N 83.6707°W	Y	Y	Y	Y	USFS
Rollways Campground and Picnic Area			44.4614°N 83.7733°W	Y	Y	Y	Y	USFS
Thompsons Landing			44.5012°N 83.8044°W		Y		Y	USFS
Sawmill Point recreation area			44.4577°N 83.6080°W		Y		Y	USFS
McKinley Bridge		61.7	44.6435°N 83.9407°W					MDNR
4001 Bridge		69.5	44.6128°N 83.8371°W					USFS
Alcona Dam		74.2	44.5619°N 83.8044°W					CE
Loud Dam		89.9	44.4635°N 83.7222°W					CE
5 Channels Dam		92.8	44.4553°N 83.6766°W					CE
Cooke Dam		100.1	44.4727°N 83.5717°W					CE
Foote Dam		108.6	44.4353°N 83.4406°W					CE
Finish line		119.5	44.4150°N 83.3298°W					Oscoda

- Au Sable River Primitive Camping has 102 single family campsites from the 4001 Bridge to Oscoda

== Bridges ==
List of Bridge Crossings
Route	Type	Municipality	County	Location
M-72 Au Sable River Bridge	City Street	Grayling	Crawford	44°39′35″N 84°42′44″W
Stephan Bridge	Stephan Bridge County Road	Grayling Township	Crawford	44.6793°N 84.5773°W
Wakeley Bridge	Wakeley Bridge County Road	Grayling Township	Crawford	44.6579°N 84.5074°W
McMasters Bridge	McMasters Bridge County Road	Luzerne	Oscoda	44.6648°N 84.3969°W
Parmalee Bridge	Parmalee Bridge County Road	Luzerne	Oscoda	44.6774°N 84.2926°W
Camp 10 Bridge	County Road 609	Big Creek Township	Oscoda	44.6690°N 84.1871°W
M-33 Mio Dam	Michigan Highway	Big Creek Township	Oscoda	44.6611°N 84.1317°W
McKinley Bridge	Evans County Road	Mentor Township	Oscoda	44.6435°N 83.9407°W
Federal Route 4001	Federal Road	Mitchell Township	Alcona	44.6128°N 83.8371°W
Alcona Dam	Bamfield County Road	Curtis Township	Alcona	44.5619°N 83.8044°W
Loud Dam	Loud Dam County Road	Oscoda Township	Iosco	44.4635°N 83.7222°W
M-65 Five Channels Dam	Michigan Highway	Oscoda Township	Iosco	44.4553°N 83.6766°W
Cooke Dam	Rea County Road	Oscoda Township	Iosco	44.4727°N 83.5717°W
Foote Dam	West River County Road	Oscoda Township	Iosco	44.4353°N 83.4406°W
East Mill Street	City Street	Oscoda	Iosco	44.4154°N 83.3308°W
US 23 Huron Road	U.S. Highway	Oscoda	Iosco	44.4074°N 83.3248°W

== See also ==
- Ausable River (Lake Huron), an Ontario tributary of Lake Huron
