= M-72–Au Sable River Bridge =

United States historic place

- M-72-Au Sable River Bridge
- U.S. National Register of Historic Places
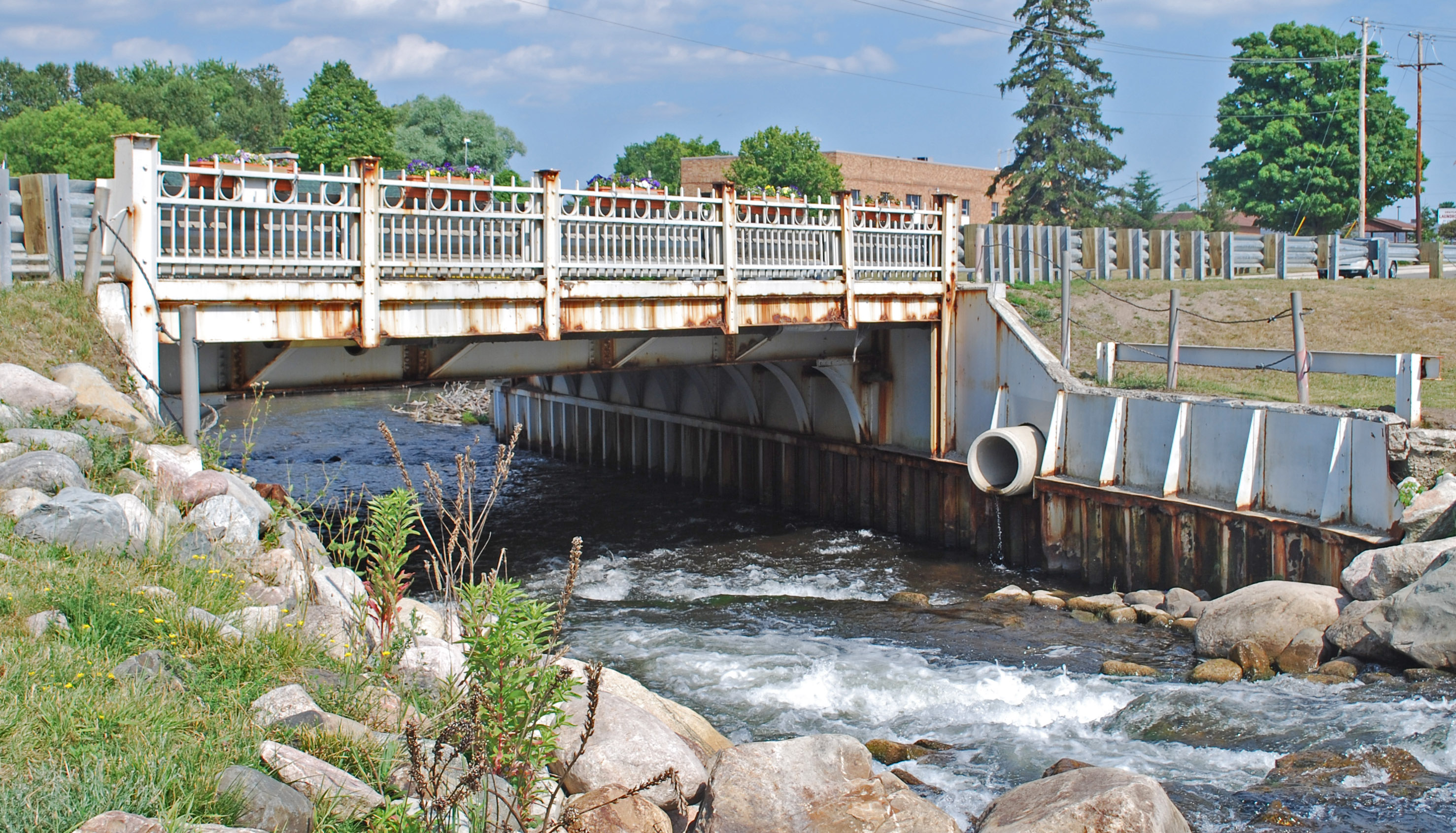

- Location within Michigan Location within the United States
- Interactive map
- Location: M-72 over Au Sable River, Grayling, Michigan
- Coordinates: 44°39′35″N 84°42′44″W
- Area: less than one acre
- Built: 1935
- Built by: F. C. Atletwed
- Architect: Michigan State Highway Department
- Architectural style: Steel rigid frame bridge
- MPS: Highway Bridges of Michigan MPS
- NRHP reference No.: 99001510
- Added to NRHP: December 9, 1999

The M-72–Au Sable River Bridge, also known as the Grayling Bridge or State Street Bridge, is a bridge located on M-72 over the Au Sable River in Grayling, Michigan. It was listed on the National Register of Historic Places in 1999.

== History ==
The village of Grayling was first platted along the Au Sable River in 1874. Soon after, a bridge was built at this location to facilitate travel across the river. However, the population of Grayling increased significantly in the early 1900s, and the state designated the route through Grayling as a state trunkline, both of which increased traffic over the existing bridge. In 1922, Grayling replaced the bridge with a sturdier version. However, increasingly heavy vehicular traffic used the bridge, and it was soon deemed inadequate. In 1933, the State Highway Department designed this replacement structure.

The bridge was built by contractor F. C. Atletwed at a cost of $13,700 and opened in 1935, and has continued to serve M-72 traffic in nearly unaltered condition.

== Description ==
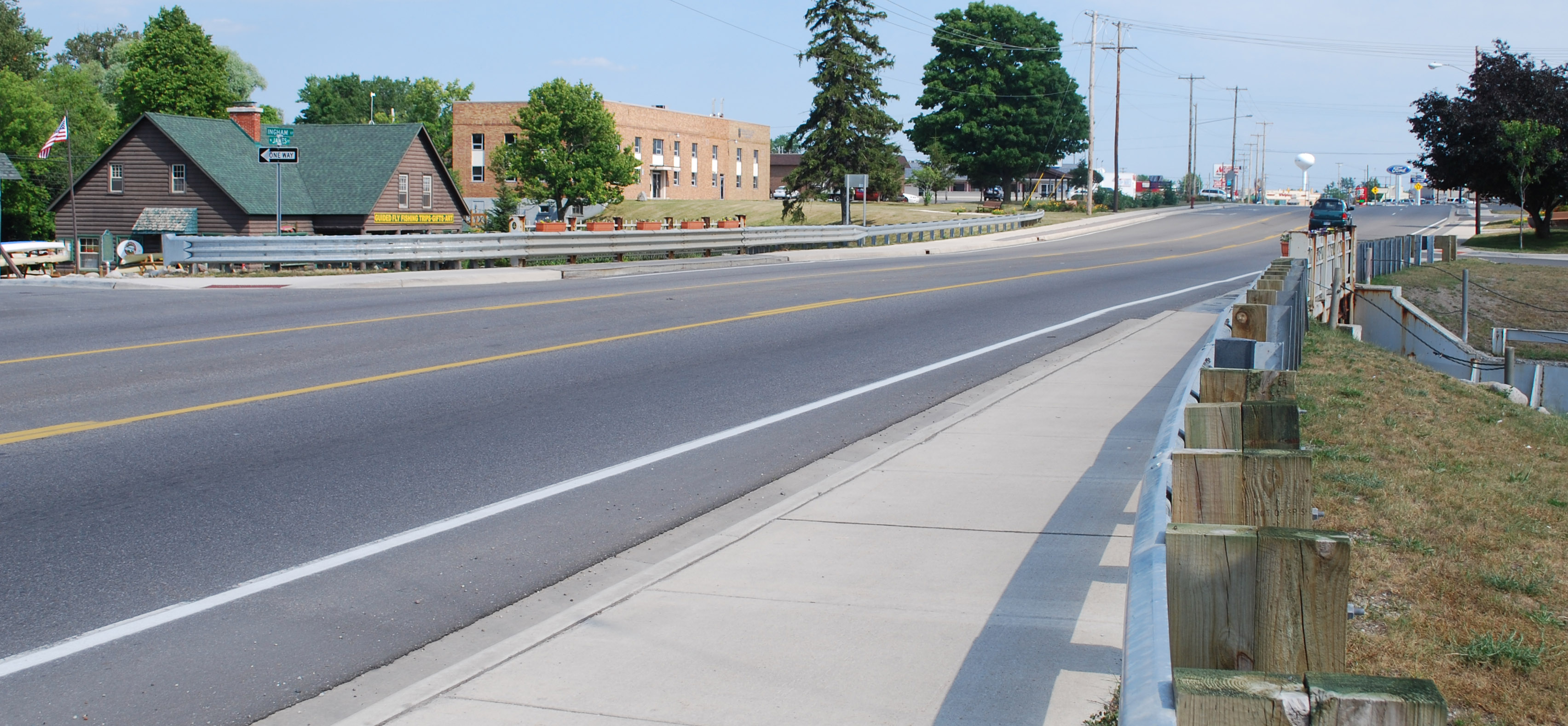
Roadway

The Grayling Bridge is a 40-foot-long (12 m), 52-foot-wide (16 m) rigid-frame steel stringer structure, with the superstructure securely connected to the abutments using of the arched brackets. Nine rolled I-beams carrying the concrete roadway and sidewalks to each side. Ornamental steel guardrails, now supplemented with Armco guardrails, line the exterior.

The bridge is significant as perhaps the earliest rigid-frame bridge built by the Michigan State Highway Department, and is the only example of a steel (as opposed to concrete) rigid-frame bridge in Michigan.
