= Five Channels Dam =

- The Five Channels Dam viewed from M-65

- Location within the state of Michigan
- Location: Oscoda Township, Iosco County, Michigan
- Coordinates: 44.45526°N 83.6766°W
- Opening date: 1912

Dam and spillways
- Type of dam: Embankment dam

Power Station
- Installed capacity: 6 MW
- Five Channels Dam Archeological District
- U.S. National Register of Historic Places
- U.S. Historic district
- Location within Michigan Location within the United States
- Nearest city: Oscoda, Michigan
- Area: 45.1 acres (18.3 ha)
- NRHP reference No.: 01001016
- Added to NRHP: March 13, 2002

Five Channels Dam is a hydro-electric dam on the Au Sable River in Michigan.

== Background ==
Consumers Power Company (now Consumers Energy) began construction on this hydro-electric dam in 1911 and completed it in 1912. The dam, the second of six built by the company on the Au Sable River, is named for the nearby location where there were once five distinct river channels. The current plant is capable of producing 6,000 kilowatts.

== Five Channels Dam worker's camp ==
During construction of the dam, the company tried to provide a healthy environment for workers by incorporating lessons learned on worker safety and health during construction of Panama Canal. They built a 45-acre camp for workers and their families, complete with a central water supply and sewage system, icehouse, school, washroom, store and boardinghouse. The workers also received land on which to build a house; the resulting structures ranged clapboard houses to log cabins to tarpaper shacks to tents. At the completion of dam construction, the worker's camp buildings were moved to the next construction site (the Loud Dam) or razed. The site of the workers' camp built to support construction of the dam was listed as an archaeological site (designated 20ES112, 20IS113, 20IS114, 20IS115, and 20IS116) on the National Register of Historic Places on March 13, 2002.

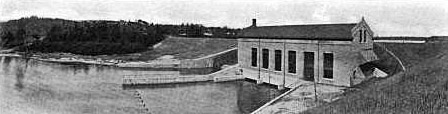
Five Channels Dam c. 1920
