= Loud Dam =

Dam in Michigan, United States

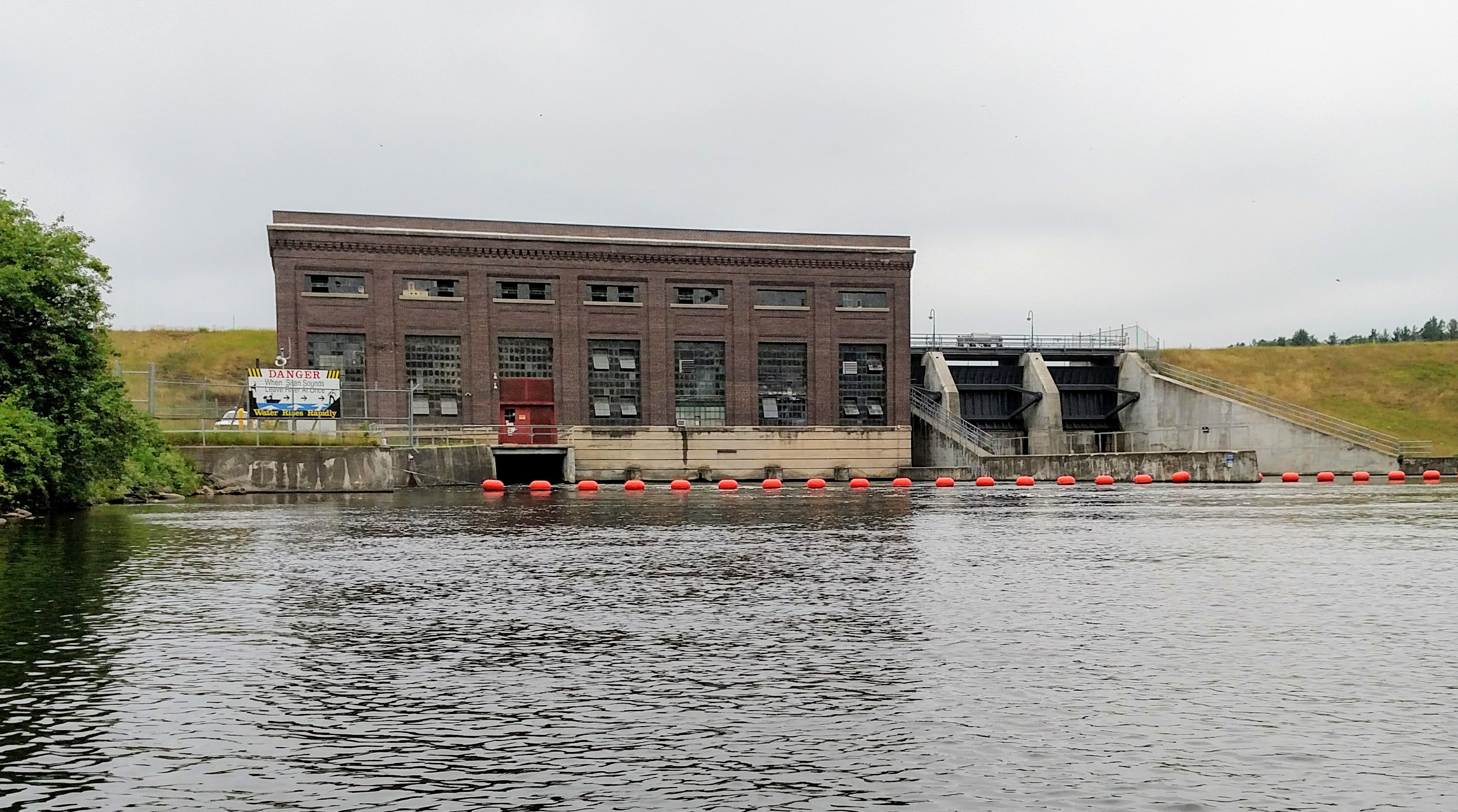
- Loud Dam Tailwater 2017

- Location within the state of Michigan
- Location: Oscoda Township, Iosco County, Michigan
- Coordinates: 44.4635456°N 83.7222398°W
- Opening date: 1913
- Owner: Consumers Energy

Dam and spillways
- Type of dam: Embankment dam
- Spillways: 3

Power Station
- Turbines: 2 Allis-Chalmers
- Installed capacity: 4 MW

Loud Dam is a hydro-electric dam on the Au Sable River in Michigan and is located along the National Register of Historic Places River Road Scenic Byway in Northern Michigan. Loud Dam is also part of the River Road Scenic Byway and listed in the National Scenic Byways Program.

== Description ==
The Loud Hydroelectric Plant consists of a series of structures located on the Au Sable River. The main dam is constructed with an embankment on each side connected by a spillway. Located near the spillway is the powerhouse and outdoor substation. Public access to Loud Pond is provided via a boat ramp maintained by Consumers Energy, and portage facilities are also provided allowing canoes and kayaks access to bypass the dam. Portage the dam on either the right or the left. The right portage is a 250-yard carry down a gravel road with a canoe slide on the down river side of the dam. The left portage is much shorter but very steep and offers no facilities; take out at the steel platform to climb over the concrete dam fence.

Loud Dam is also part of the River Road Scenic Byway and listed in the National Scenic Byways Program.

== Namesake ==
Loud Dam is named after the Loud lumber family, particularly Edward F. Loud, who had done extensive lumber business along the Au Sable and bought up most of the cutover Au Sable lands between 1900 and 1906, then later partnered with company founder William Foote and others to build the Au Sable hydros. Loud owned most of the lands on the Au Sable River from Mio to Oscoda prior to selling them to the power company in 1909. Loud retired after helping to promote the Au Sable River hydro-electric power development and he and his wife bought and developed Loud Island, a 30-acre summer retreat in the heart of Van Etten Lake just two miles from the shores of Lake Huron, near the city of Oscoda, in northeastern Michigan. Edward Francis Loud was the son of 19th century Oscoda lumber tycoon Henry M. Loud. The Detroit Free Press described the Loud family lumber business, H.M. Loud Co., as one of the state's richest lumbar companies. Upon his death in January 1952, newspapers in Maine, Michigan, and New York ran stories including the New York Times (Jan 20, 1952, Pg 84) who ran an article about Loud with the headline "LUMBER 'KING' DIES AT 93". The Daily News in New York City said (Jan 20, 1952, pg 71), "one of the last of Michigan's lumber kings, died today."

== Technical Information ==
Capable of producing 4 megawatts, it was the 3rd hydro dam completed along the Au Sable River by Consumers Power Company and was completed in 1913 The Loud dam is one of 6 dams portaged by canoe race teams during the 120-mile long overnight Au Sable River Canoe Marathon that happens each summer. According to the book "The Lower Peninsula of Michigan: An Inventory of Historic Engineering and Industrial Sites" by Charles K Hyde the Loud dam is an earth embankment dam utilizing a reinforced concrete core wall creating a head of 27 feet of water. The original installation is still intact including the two Allis-Chalmers horizontal turbines and two General Electric generators each producing 2,000 KW, 2,500-volts, and operating at 120 R.P.M. The powerhouse is a flat-roofed, rectangular building measuring 40 ft wide by 120 ft long and resting on a concrete foundation. The spillway is concrete with three tainter gates capable of discharging 16,650 cubic feet per second.
