= Cooke Dam =

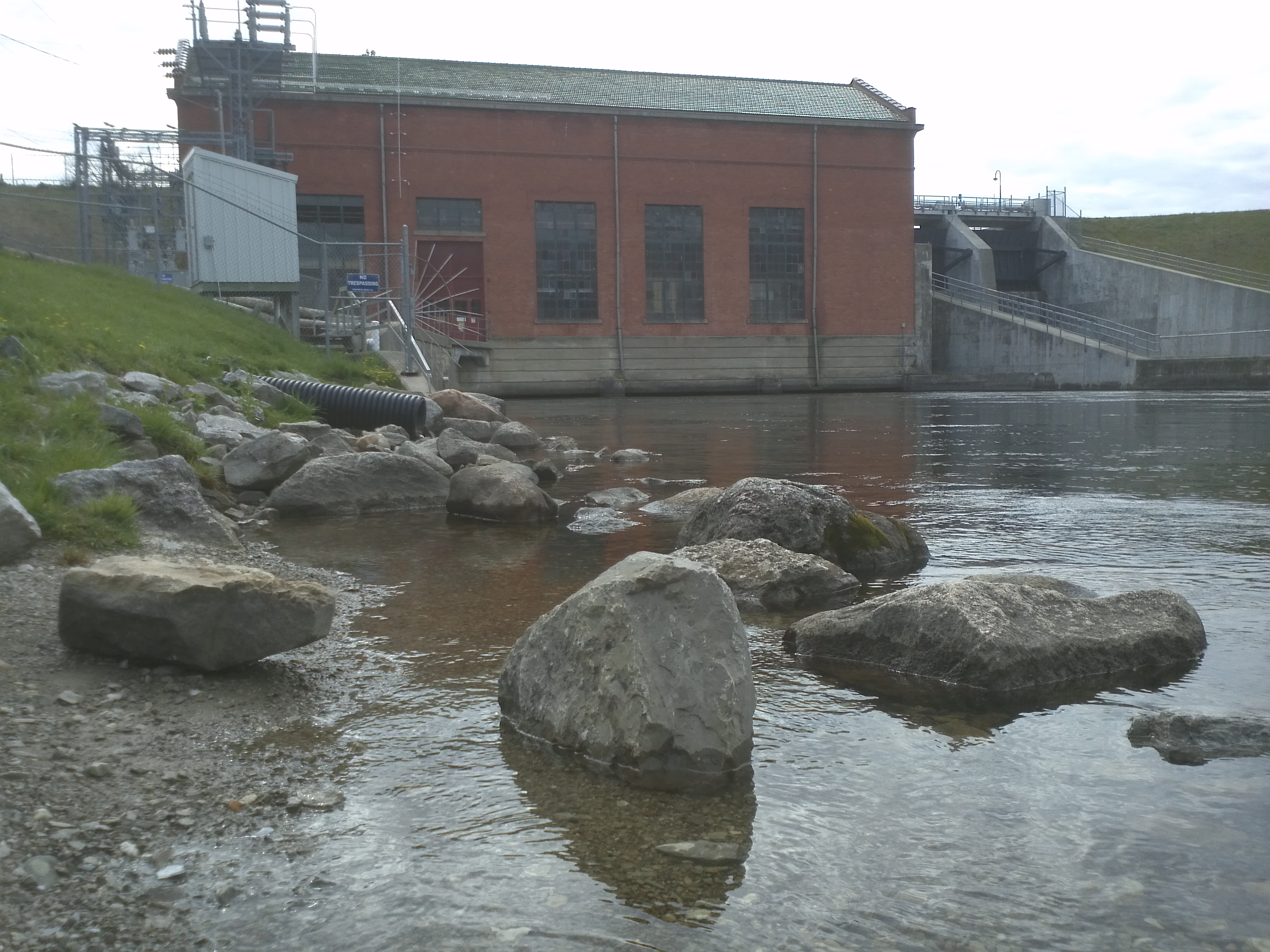
- Cooke Dam

- Location within the state of Michigan
- Location: Oscoda Township, Iosco County, Michigan
- Coordinates: 44.472669°N 83.571677°W
- Construction began: 1911

Dam and spillways
- Type of dam: Embankment dam

Power Station
- Installed capacity: 9 MW
- Cooke Hydroelectric Plant
- U.S. National Register of Historic Places
- U.S. Historic district
- Interactive map
- Nearest city: Oscoda, Michigan
- Area: 4 acres (1.6 ha)
- Built: 1912
- Architect: William Gilbert Fargo, James Berry Foote
- Architectural style: Classical Revival
- NRHP reference No.: 96000803
- Added to NRHP: August 2, 1996

Cooke Dam is a hydro-electric dam on the Au Sable River in Michigan. It was listed on the National Register of Historic Places in 1996 as the Cooke Hydroelectric Plant.

== Background ==
William Augustine Foote was an ambitious entrepreneur who established himself by developing a series of electric utility companies in Jackson, Battle Creek, Albion, and other cities in Michigan. In 1899, he introduced the concept of high-voltage transmission to Michigan, using a 22,000 volt line to send power from the Trowbridge Dam and Powerhouse to Kalamazoo, a distance of 22 miles. Foote soon became interested in using the steadily flowing Au Sable River to generate power, but was for a time unable to generate the financial backing necessary. However, Foote was involved in other electrical utility activities, including the establishment of the Croton Dam, where power was transmitted over a distance of 40 miles at 110,000 volts. In 1909, Foote consolidated his holdings and merged with other utilities to form Consumers Power Company.

With the financial backing of Consumers Power, Foote returned to the Au Sable in 1909 and identified three sites on which to place hydroelectric dams. This site, the first to be developed, was suggested by banker Andrew Cooke, who helped secure financing for the project and became the dam's namesake. A large construction camp was established that same year for the workers on the dam. The river was diverted next, and by mid-1910 the dam foundation was in place.

This dam began generating electricity in December 1911, with an original capacity of 9,000 kilowatts, Transmission line ran 125 miles to Flint at a voltage of 140,000 volts, establishing a world record. Innovations included in the new project were three-legged, windmill-like towers that supported the transmission line and advances in insulator design. The Cooke plant was the first of six Au Sable River hydros completed over the next 12 years.

The Cooke plant now generates power at a lower 46,000 volts. However, the plant, and its original generating equipment, is still in use. Cooke Hydro is also part of the River Road Scenic Byway and listed in the National Scenic Byways Program.

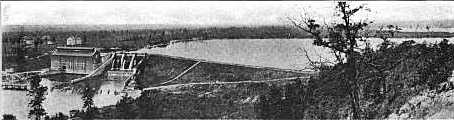
Cooke Dam Au Sable River MI c 1920

== Description ==
The Cooke Hydroelectric Plant consists of a series of structures located on the Au Sable River. The main dam is constructed with an embankment on each side connected by a spillway. Located near the spillway is the powerhouse and outdoor substation. Nearby are two separate structures: an attendant's house, and a storage shed.

=== Embankments and Spillway ===
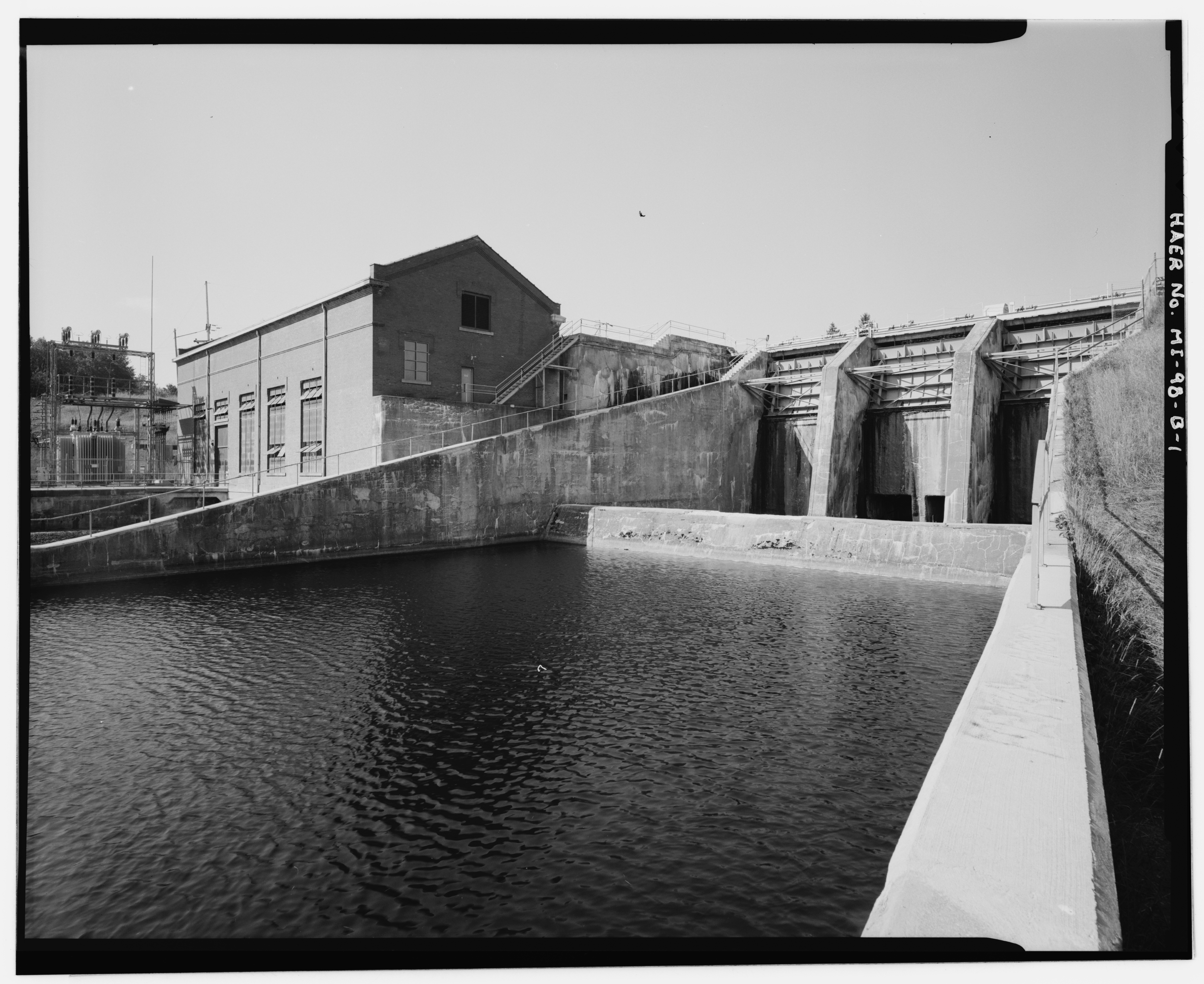
Spillway (powerhouse is at left)

The two embankments form a V-shaped impediment across the river. The north embankment is a 572 feet long earthen dam, reinforced on the upstream side by a 12"-thick concrete wall. The south embankment is of similar construction but is only 90 feet long. The spillway is controlled by three steel Tainter gates, which are only opened to pass floodwaters. Normal river flow is directed through the powerhouse, which is situated adjacent to the spillway.

=== Powerhouse and Substation ===
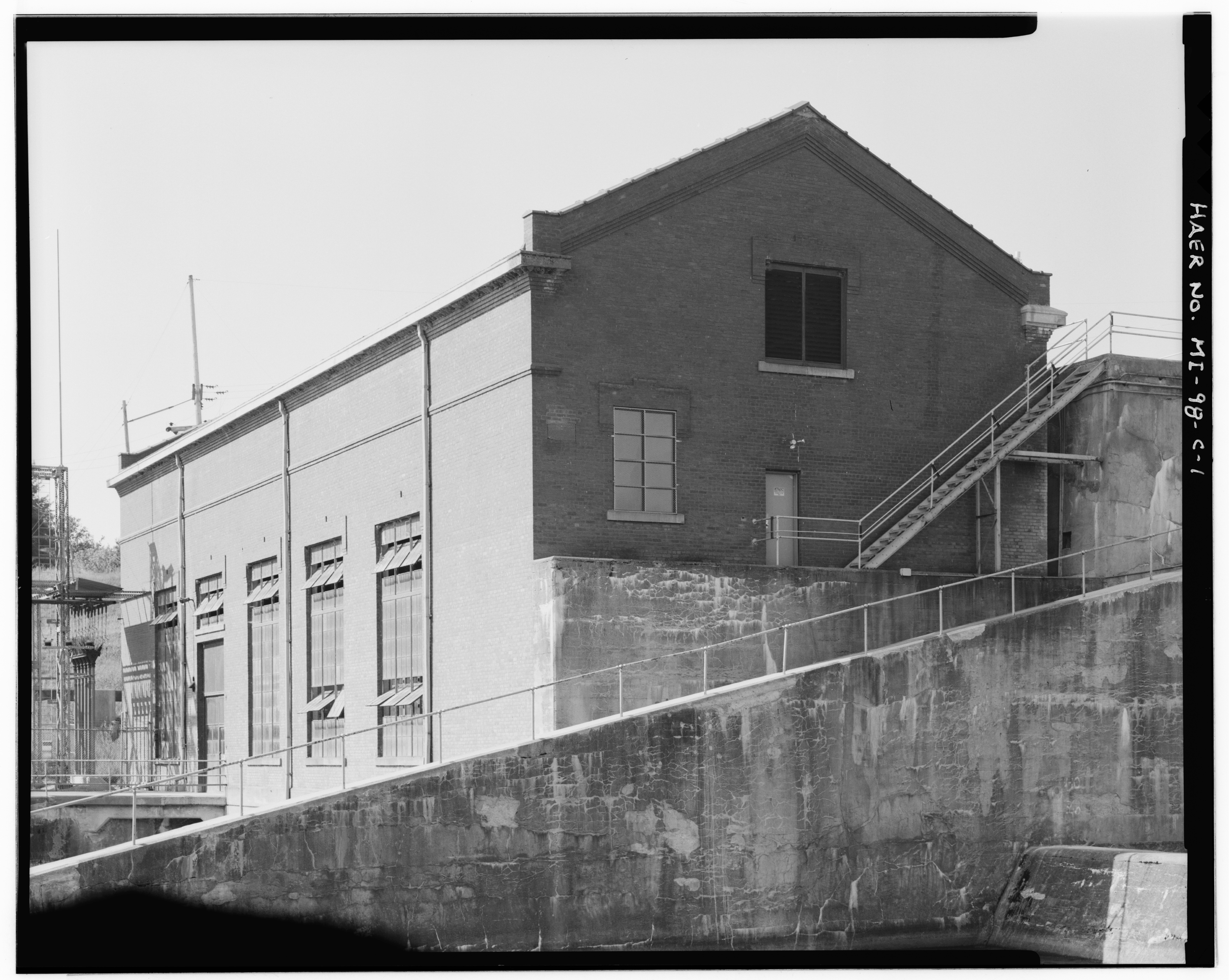
Powerhouse, with substation at left

The powerhouse is a red brick structure with a green tile roof measuring 116 feet by 67 feet. There are five windows in the main facade with flat arch brick window hoods. Personnel and cargo doors occupy the lower portion of one of the window openings.

The interior of the powerhouse is largely open, and includes a basement and mezzanine. Most of the floorspace is occupied by generators and their governors. Generators in the powerhouse are connected to turbines in the adjacent penstock.

At one corner of the powerhouse is the outdoor substation, where a small concrete pad supports transformers and other equipment, A chain link fence surrounds the substation.

=== Attendant's House ===
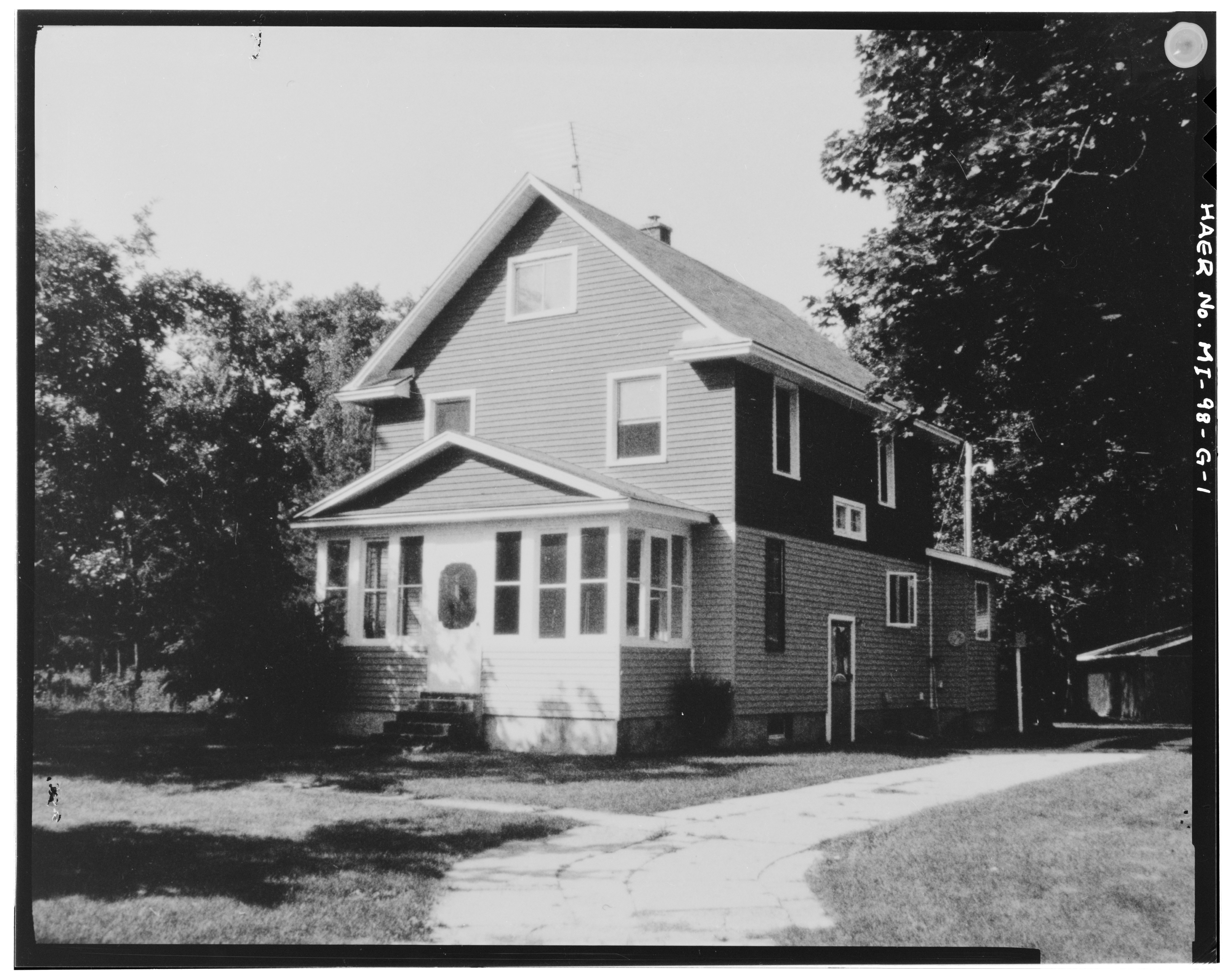
Attendant's House

The attendant's house is a 2 1/2-story wood-frame building with a front gable. It was built around 1909 to provide onsite accommodations for plant operators, due to the isolated nature of the site at the turn of the century. Access to the plant at that time was either by an 18-mile wagon road or by a 160-mile, narrow gauge logging railroad. The house has a pedimented front porch and dormers and eave returns on the main gable which suggest a Classical Revival style. Round columns once supported the roof of the front porch, but have since been removed when the porch was enclosed.

=== Storage Shed ===
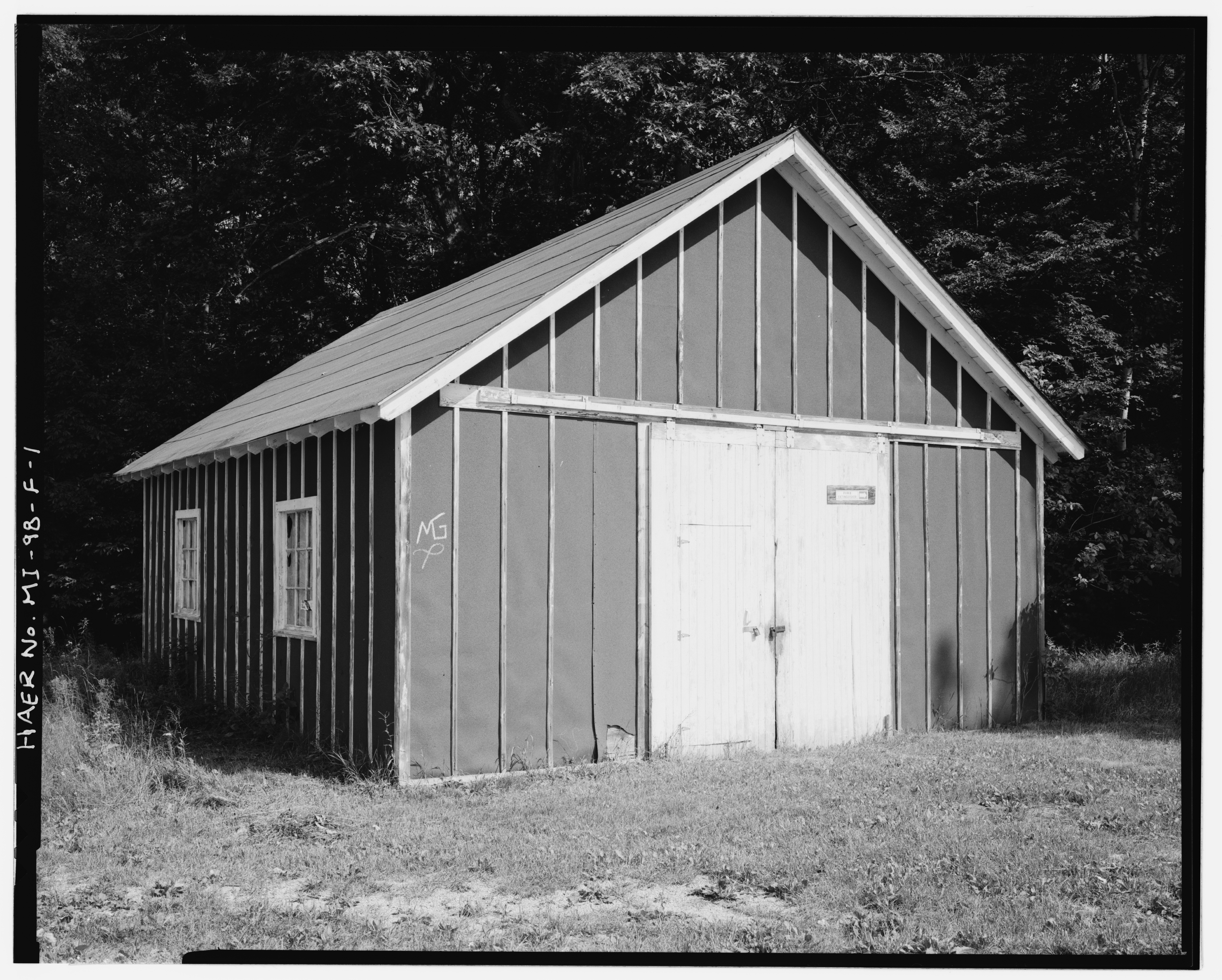
Storage Shed

The storage shed is a single-story wood-frame structure sheathed in board-and-batten siding with double cargo doors on the main facade. The shed is likely a remnant of the original construction camp built to support the construction of the dam.
