= Foote Dam =

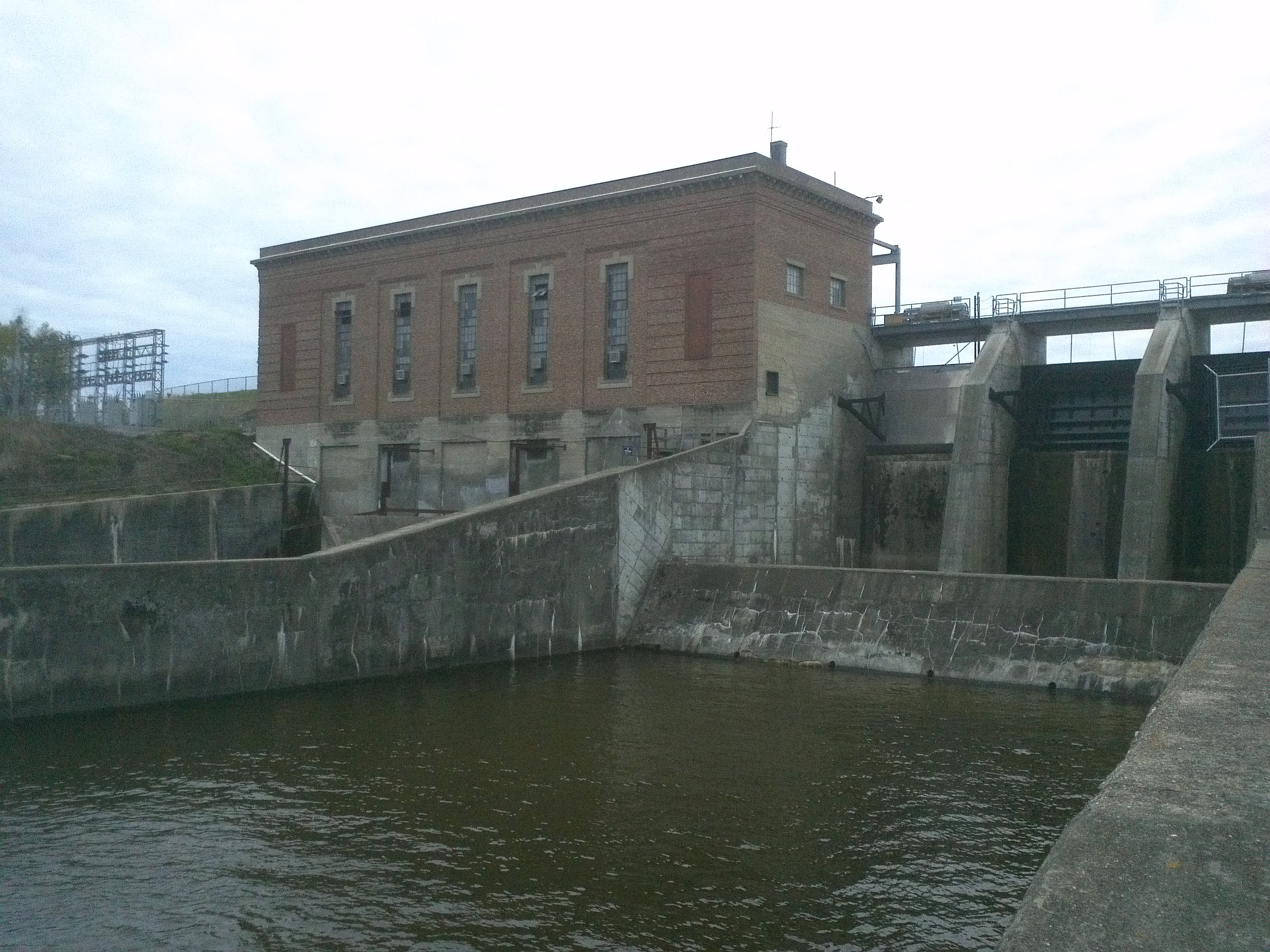
- Foote Dam

- Location within the state of Michigan
- Location: Oscoda Township, Iosco County, Michigan
- Coordinates: 44.435335°N 83.440604°W
- Opening date: 1918

Dam and spillways
- Type of dam: Embankment dam

Power Station
- Installed capacity: 9 MW

Foote Dam is a hydro-electric dam on the Au Sable River in Michigan.

== Background ==
This hydro-electric dam was completed in 1918 and has a capacity of 9,000 kilowatts. It is located 9 miles upstream from Lake Huron and is named for William A. Foote, the founder of Consumers Power, which later became Consumers Energy. In 1896, Foote took a side trip from Kalamazoo to Allegan, where he conceived the idea of a hydroelectric plant along the Kalamazoo River. In Foote's mind, that plant and others would power the industrial centers throughout the state.

The dam is privately owned and operated by Consumers Energy.
