= Alcona Dam =

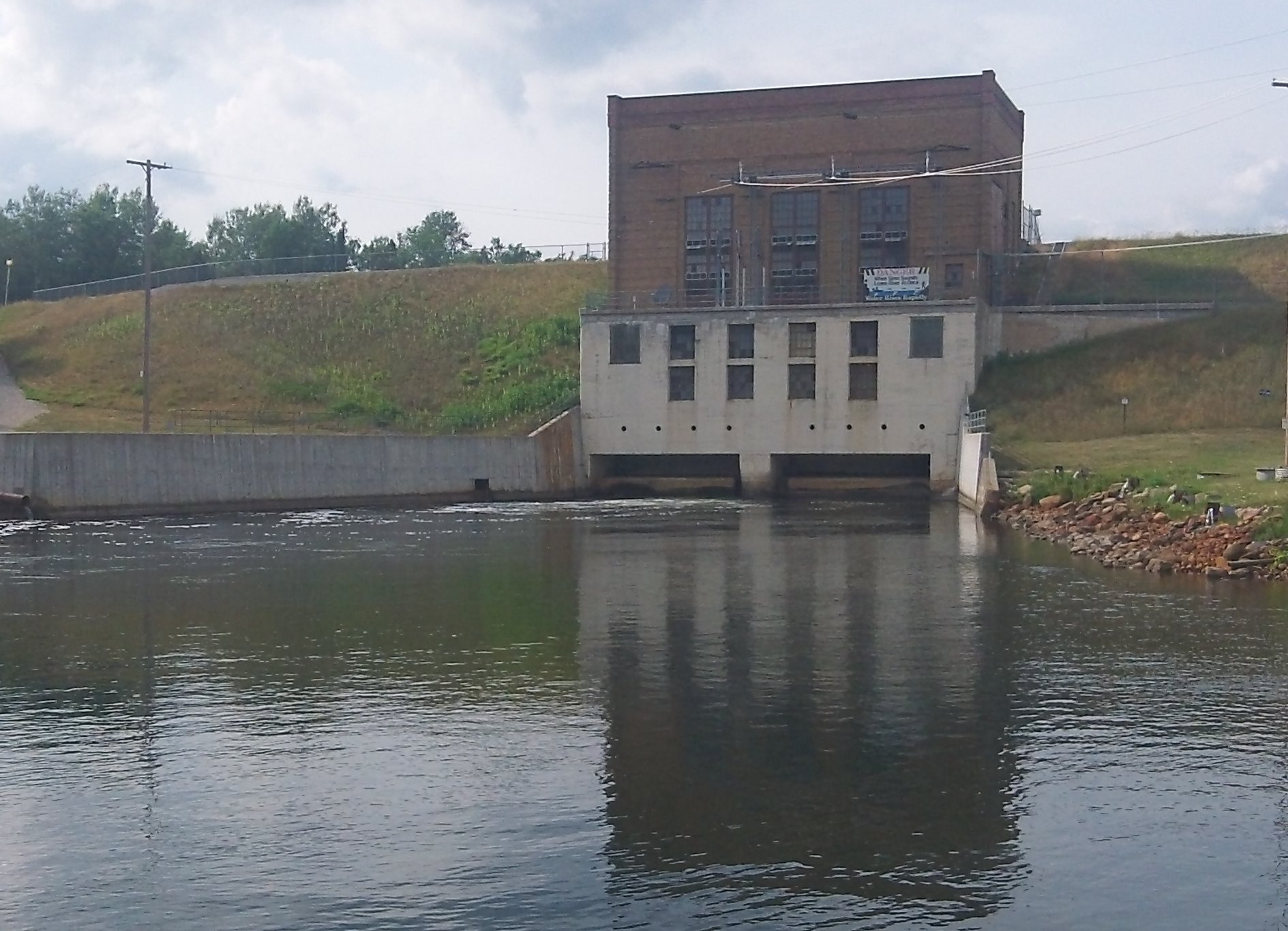
- The Alcona Dam

- Location within the state of Michigan
- Location: Curtis Township, Alcona County, Michigan
- Coordinates: 44.56193°N 83.80442°W
- Opening date: 1924

Dam and spillways
- Type of dam: Embankment dam

Power Station
- Installed capacity: 8 MW

Alcona Dam is a hydro-electric dam on the Au Sable River in Michigan.

== Background ==
This hydro-electric dam is capable of producing 8,000 kilowatts. It is currently named after the county where it is located, but was originally named for a nearby road called Bamfield. Work began on Bamfield Dam in 1917, but the project stalled due to unstable sand and World War I. Construction resumed in 1923, and Alcona Hydro began commercial operation in 1924. The drop in elevation is approximately 30 feet (9.1 m), depending on the time of year.
