= List of shipwrecks in the Thunder Bay National Marine Sanctuary =

Sanctuary location

Thunder Bay National Marine Sanctuary and Underwater Preserve is a United States National Marine Sanctuary on Lake Huron's Thunder Bay, within the northeastern region of the U.S. state of Michigan. It protects an estimated 116 historically significant shipwrecks ranging from nineteenth-century wooden side-wheelers to twentieth-century steel-hulled steamers. Seven of the wrecks are listed on the National Register of Historic Places.

== Shipwrecks within the sanctuary ==
Ship	Ship type	Build date	Sunk date	Depth	Notes	Coordinates	NRHP status	Image
Albany	Wooden paddle steamer	1846	1853	5 feet (1.5 m)	On November 26, 1853, while carrying 200 passengers and various supplies, Albany went aground near Presque Isle, Michigan, and was destroyed by a storm the next day.	45.323267°N 83.458467°W	Not listed	
Alvin Buckingham	Wooden schooner	1853	1870	8 feet (2.4 m)	On October 19, 1870, Alvin Buckingham started to leak off Black River Island. Her crew ended up beaching her in shallow water, where she filled with water and sank.	44.840983°N 83.285383°W	Not listed	
American Union	Wooden schooner	1862	1894	10 feet (3.0 m)	On May 6, 1894, American Union ran aground in a storm near Presque Isle, Michigan.	45.356867°N 83.589467°W	Not listed	
Barge No.1	Wooden barge	1895	1918	42 feet (13 m)	On November 8, 1918, Barge No.1 ran aground on a reef at the southern point of Thunder Bay in an autumn storm and quickly broke up.	45.015317°N 83.303967°W	Not listed	
Barge No.12	Steel barge	1897	1975	40 feet (12 m)	On July 8, 1975, Barge No.12 sank for unknown reasons off Presque Isle, Michigan.	45.13655°N 83.159233°W	Not listed	
Bay City	Wooden schooner	1857	1902	11 feet (3.4 m)	On November 29, 1902, Bay City was driven against a pier in Alpena, Michigan and abandoned.	45.056139°N 83.426750°W	Not listed	
Benjamin Franklin	Wooden paddle steamer	1842	1850	55 feet (17 m)	On October 8, 1850, Benjamin Franklin went aground on Thunder Bay Island and sank.	45.032233°N 83.19215°W	Not listed	
B.W. Blanchard	Wooden steamer	1870	1904	9 feet (2.7 m)	On November 29, 1904, B.W. Blanchard ran aground on North Point Reef with the schooners John T. Johnson and John Kilderhouse; the former of which was also lost.	45.021183°N 83.262717°W	Not listed	
Choctaw	Steel semi-whaleback ship	1892	1915	300 feet (91 m)	On July 11, 1915, Choctaw was bound from Cleveland, Ohio for Marquette, Michigan with a cargo of coal. At around 5:30 a.m. the Canadian steamer Wahcondah rammed Choctaw on her port side. She eventually rolled over, and sank.	45.534010°N 83.509300°W	Listed	
City of Alpena	Wooden tug	1874	1880	9 feet (2.7 m)	On August 9, 1880, City of Alpena caught fire and sank near Black River, Michigan.	44.7878°N 83.2944°W	Not listed	
Congress	Wooden steamer	1861	1868	17 feet (5.2 m)	On October 22, 1868, while bound for Chicago, Illinois with a cargo of salt, apples and railroad iron, when she stranded and burned near North Point.	45.014459°N 83.259048°W	Not listed	
Cornelia B. Windiate	Wooden schooner	1874	1875	180 feet (55 m)	In November 1875, Cornelia B. Windiate was bound from Milwaukee, Wisconsin for Buffalo, New York with a cargo of corn, when she disappeared with all hands off Presque Isle, Michigan.	45.325433°N 83.218433°W	Not listed	
Corsair	Wooden schooner	1866	1872	182 feet (55 m)	On September 29, 1872, Corsair sank with the loss of five lives off Harrisville, Michigan.	44.782033°N 83.123767°W	Not listed	
Corsican	Wooden schooner	1862	1893	160 feet (49 m)	On June 2, 1893, Corsican was rammed and sunk by the steamer Corsica off Thunder Bay.	44.912667°N 83.055°W	Not listed	
Defiance	Wooden schooner	1848	1854	185 feet (56 m)	On October 20, 1854, Defiance was bound from Chicago, Illinois for Detroit, Michigan with a cargo of grain, when she was rammed and sunk by the schooner John J. Audubon, which also sank.	45.2343°N 83.27845°W	Not listed	
Detroit	Wooden steamer	1859	1872	10 feet (3.0 m)	On September 29, 1872, Detroit was driven ashore on the coast of Lake Huron near Greenbush, Michigan, with a cargo of lumber. A few weeks later during salvage operations, one of the chains used to lift Detroit cut her in half, causing her to sink.	44.586183°N 83.311433°W	Not listed	
D. M. Wilson	Wooden bulk freighter	1873	1894	40 feet (12 m)	On October 27, 1894, while heading to Milwaukee, Wisconsin with a load of coal, D. M. Wilson sprang a leak and started to sink. The steamers SS Hudson (1888) and Samuel Mitchell took her in tow, but she sank off Thunder Bay Island.	45.065333°N 83.182133°W	Not listed	
D. R. Hanna	Steel bulk freighter	1906	1919	135 feet (41 m)	On May 16, 1919, D. R. Hanna was bound from Duluth, Minnesota for Buffalo, New York with a cargo of wheat, when she was rammed by the freighter Quincy A. Shaw. She eventually rolled over and sank.	45.084167°N 83.08655°W	Not listed	
Dump scow	Wooden scow	Unknown	c. 1930	130 feet (40 m)	Unidentified wooden scow believed to have been abandoned and scuttled c. 1930.	45.212667°N 83.299567°W	Not listed	
Duncan City	Wooden tug	1883	c. 1923	15 feet (4.6 m)	Duncan City was abandoned and scuttled c. 1923. She was listed as abandoned in 1927.	45.413117°N 83.762217°W	Not listed	
E.B. Allen	Wooden schooner	1864	1871	100 feet (30 m)	On November 20, 1871, E. B. Allen was bound for Buffalo, New York with a cargo of grain when she was rammed and sunk by the bark Newsboy.	45.016267°N 83.164983°W	Not listed	
Egyptian	Wooden bulk freighter	1873	1897	230 feet (70 m)	On December 1, 1897, Egyptian was bound from Cleveland, Ohio for Milwaukee, Wisconsin with a cargo of coal when she caught fire and sank off Black River, Michigan.	44.782539°N 83.190078°W	Not listed	
Empire State	Wooden brigantine	1862	1877	12 feet (3.7 m)	On November 8, 1877, Empire State was bound from Marquette, Michigan for Cleveland, Ohio with a cargo of iron ore when she ran aground on North Point Reef.	45.014217°N 83.256283°W	Not listed	
Etruria	Steel bulk freighter	1902	1905	310 feet (94 m)	On June 18, 1905, Etruria was bound from Toledo, Ohio for Superior, Wisconsin with a cargo of coal when she was rammed by the downbound freighter Amasa Stone. Etruria eventually rolled over and sank.	45.483°N 83.473683°W	Not listed	
Florida	Wooden package freighter	1889	1897	206 feet (63 m)	On May 21, 1897, Florida was sailing off Presque Isle, Michigan with a cargo of flour, barrels of whiskey, syrup, and various manufactured goods, when she was rammed and sunk by the freighter George W. Roby.	45.29635°N 83.283517°W	Not listed	
F.T. Barney	Wooden schooner	1856	1868	160 feet (49 m)	On October 23, 1868, F.T. Barney was bound from Cleveland, Ohio for Milwaukee, Wisconsin with a cargo of coal when she was rammed and sunk by the schooner T.J. Bronson.	45.485833°N 83.8425°W	Listed	
Galena	Wooden steamer	1857	1872	16 feet (4.9 m)	On September 24, 1872, while loaded with a cargo of lumber, Galena ran hard aground on North Point Reef, eventually going to pieces.	45.007667°N 83.249833°W	Not listed	
Grecian	Steel bulk freighter	1891	1906	100 feet (30 m)	On June 7, 1906, Grecian struck a rock near DeTour Village, Michigan in the St. Marys River and sank. She was eventually refloated and taken in tow of the freighter Sir Henry Bessemer, which would take her to Detroit, Michigan for repairs. On June 15, 1906, while off Thunder Bay Island Grecian unexpectedly filled with water and sank.	44.968611°N 83.200833°W	Listed	
Haltiner barge	Wooden barge	Unknown	c. 1929	13 feet (4.0 m)	An unidentified wooden derrick barge believed to have sunk c. 1929.	45.03485°N 83.326583°W	Not listed	
Harvey Bissell	Wooden schooner barge	1866	1905	15 feet (4.6 m)	On November 24, 1905, the empty Harvey Bissell ran aground between Presque Isle, Michigan and Thunder Bay Island. Three weeks later, she was raised and towed to Alpena, Michigan where she was dismantled and scuttled.	45.054783°N 83.426717°W	Not listed	
Heart Failure	Wooden dredge	Unknown	Before 1910	18 feet (5.5 m)	The wooden dredge believed to have been abandoned sometime before 1910.	45.0621°N 83.37755°W	Not listed	
Ironton	Schooner barge	Unknown	1894		On September 26, 1894, Ironton was under tow in ballast along with the schooner barge Moonlight (United States), also in ballast, by the steamer Charles J. Kershaw on a voyage from Ashtabula, Ohio, to Marquette, Michigan, when Charles J. Kershaw′s steam engine broke down in Lake Huron off the coast of Michigan a few miles north of New Presque Isle Light. With a strong south wind pushing the two schooner barges toward Charles J. Kershaw, Moonlight's crew cut Ironton's tow line to free the two schooner barges from the steamer and prevent a collision. Ironton drifted into the path of the steamer Ohio, which collided with Ironton head-on and sank quickly. Ironton then drifted out of sight of ships rescuing Ohio's crew and sank an hour after the collision. Her crew of seven tried to abandon ship in her yawl, but the yawl remained tied to Ironton, which pulled the yawl to the bottom when she sank. Ironton's captain and four other crewmen drowned, leaving two survivors clinging to wreckage. The steamer Charles Hebard (United States) rescued the two men a few hours later.		Not listed	
Isaac M. Scott	Steel bulk freighter	1909	1913	175 feet (53 m)	On November 11, 1913, Isaac M. Scott was bound from Cleveland, Ohio for Milwaukee, Wisconsin with a cargo of coal, when she encountered the Great Lakes Storm of 1913. When she was sailing off Thunder Bay Island, Isaac M. Scott capsized and sank with the loss of all her crew.	45.065333°N 83.039217°W	Not listed	
Ishpeming	Wooden schooner	1872	1903	12 feet (3.7 m)	On November 29, 1903, while loaded with a cargo of coal, Ishpeming was driven ashore on Black River Island, where she broke up.	44.809817°N 83.2775°W	Not listed	
James Davidson	Wooden bulk freighter	1874	1883	35 feet (11 m)	On October 4, 1883, James Davidson was bound from Buffalo, New York for Duluth, Minnesota with a cargo of coal when she ran aground on the southern tip of Thunder Bay Island, eventually breaking up.	45.0324°N 83.192717°W	Not listed	
James H. Hall	Wooden schooner	1885	1916	6 feet (1.8 m)	On November 6, 1916, while loaded with a cargo of lumber James H. Hall tried to enter the Thunder Bay River, but she swerved, hit a pier and sank.	45.0574°N 83.4294°W	Not listed	
John F. Warner	Wooden schooner	1855	1890	9 feet (2.7 m)	On October 13, 1890, John F. Warner was driven ashore near Alpena, Michigan, where she broke in half and sank.	45.050833°N 83.435467°W	Not listed	
John Shaw	Wooden schooner	1884	1894	128 feet (39 m)	On November 13, 1894, John Shaw was heading to Chicago, Illinois with a cargo of coal, when she sank in a snowstorm off Harrisville, Michigan.	44.616667°N 83.133333°W	Not Listed	
John T. Johnson	Wooden schooner barge	1873	1904	7 feet (2.1 m)	On November 29, 1904, John T. Johnson ran aground on North Point Reef, while being towed by the steamer B.W. Blanchard, and being followed by the schooner John Kilderhouse, the latter of which was recovered.	45.02165°N 83.262017°W	Not listed	
John J. Audubon	Wooden schooner	1854	1854	170 feet (52 m)	On October 21, 1854, while loaded with a cargo of railroad iron, John J. Audubon rammed the upbound schooner Defiance. Both Defiance and John J. Audubon sank.	45.28885°N 83.339183°W	Not listed	
Joseph S. Fay	Wooden bulk freighter	1871	1905	17 feet (5.2 m)	On October 19, 1905, Joseph S. Fay was bound from Escanaba, Michigan for Ashtabula, Ohio with a cargo of iron ore, when she ran aground near Forty Mile Point Light.	45.488611°N 83.91°W	Listed	
Knight Templar	Wooden schooner barge	1865	1903	5 feet (1.5 m)	Knight Templar was abandoned and scuttled on July 25, 1903.	45.05°N 83.366667°W	Not listed	
Kyle Spangler	Wooden schooner	1856	1860	180 feet (55 m)	On November 7, 1860, while upbound with a cargo of corn, Kyle Spangler was rammed and sunk by the downbound schooner Racine.	45.383611°N 83.435278°W	Listed	
Light Guard	Wooden schooner barge	1866	1903	7 feet (2.1 m)	Light Guard was abandoned and scuttled on July 22, 1903.	45.05°N 83.383333°W	Not listed	
Loretta	Wooden steam barge	1892	1896	7 feet (2.1 m)	On October 7, 1896, while loaded with a cargo of chains, Loretta caught fire and was towed out into the lake where she sank.	44.81505°N 83.282583°W	Not listed	
Lucinda Van Valkenburg	Wooden schooner	1862	1887	60 feet (18 m)	On May 31, 1887, while laden with coal, Lucinda Van Valkenburg was rammed and sunk by the steamer Lehigh north of Thunder Bay Island.	45.056333°N 83.169667°W	Not listed	
Maid of the Mist	Wooden schooner	1863	1878	7 feet (2.1 m)	On September 25, 1878, Maid of the Mist was caught in a gale, grounded, broke in half and sank.	45.116183°N 83.3174°W	Not listed	
Marine City	Wooden paddle steamer	1866	1880	5 feet (1.5 m)	On August 29, 1880, while downbound carrying passengers and a cargo of shingles and fish, Marine City caught fire and sank, killing nine people.	44.770617°N 83.289433°W	Not listed	
Messenger	Wooden steam barge	1866	1890	194 feet (59 m)	On November 12, 1890, Messenger caught fire in Rogers City, Michigan; she was then towed out into the lake where she sank.	45.483333°N 83.85°W	Not listed	
M.F. Merrick	Wooden schooner	1863	1889	310 feet (94 m)	On May 17, 1889, while loaded with a cargo of sand, M.F. Merrick was rammed and sunk off Presque Isle, Michigan by the steamer R.P. Ranney.	45.4705°N 83.44625°W	Not listed	
Monohansett	Wooden steam barge	1872	1907	18 feet (5.5 m)	On November 23, 1907, while loaded with a cargo of coal, Monohansett caught fire, burned to the waterline and sank south of Thunder Bay Island.	45.033267°N 83.1998°W	Not listed	
Montana	Wooden steam barge	1872	1914	63 feet (19 m)	On September 6, 1914, Montana was heading from Detroit, Michigan to Georgian Bay to load lumber, when she caught fire, burned to the waterline and sank near North Point.	44.98375°N 83.266883°W	Not listed	
Monrovia	Steel ocean freighter	1943	1959	140 feet (43 m)	On June 25, 1959, Monrovia was on her way to Chicago, Illinois with a cargo of steel, when she was rammed and sunk by the freighter Royalton.	44.590278°N 82.553333°W	Not listed	
Newell A. Eddy	Wooden schooner barge	1890	1893	168 feet (51 m)	On April 22, 1893, Newell A. Eddy was bound from Buffalo, New York for Chicago, Illinois with a cargo of wheat, when she encountered a storm and sank with all hands.	45.781417°N 84.230283°W	Not listed	
New Orleans	Wooden paddle steamer	1838	1849	15 feet (4.6 m)	On June 14, 1849, while upbound, New Orleans ran aground on a reef west of Thunder Bay Island.	45.042983°N 83.240417°W	Not listed	
New Orleans	Wooden bulk freighter	1885	1906	145 feet (44 m)	On June 30, 1906, New Orleans was rammed and sunk by the steamer William R. Linn north of Thunder Bay Island.	45.16755°N 83.217383°W	Not listed	
Nordmeer	Steel ocean freighter	1954	1966	40 feet (12 m)	On November 19, 1966, Nordmeer ran aground 7 miles (11 km) northeast of Thunder Bay Island, eventually going to pieces.	45.136017°N 83.159767°W	Not listed	
Norman	Steel bulk freighter	1890	1895	210 feet (64 m)	On May 30, 1895, while on her way to Escanaba, Michigan to load iron ore, Norman was rammed and sunk by the steamer Jack. Five people died.	45.311667°N 83.278889°W	Listed	
Northern Light	Wooden barge	1858	1881	2 feet (0.61 m)	In August 1881, Northern Light stranded near Harrisville, Michigan, eventually going to pieces.	44.660267°N 83.286817°W	Not listed	
Northwestern	Wooden brig	1847	1850	135 feet (41 m)	On September 30, 1850, while laden with a cargo of salt, Northwestern was rammed and sunk by the steamer Monticello.	45.448083°N 83.69695°W	Not listed	
O. E. Parks	Wooden steam barge	1891	1929	62 feet (19 m)	On May 3, 1929, while bound from Sault Ste. Marie, Michigan for Alpena, Michigan with a cargo of pulpwood, O. E. Parks encountered heavy seas and snow. She started taking on water and eventually sank.	45.0519°N 83.17545°W	Not listed	
Ogarita	Wooden schooner barge	1864	1905	30 feet (9.1 m)	On October 25, 1905, Ogarita caught fire and sank north of Thunder Bay Island.	45.105433°N 83.21795°W	Not listed	
Ohio	Wooden bulk freighter	1875	1894	300 feet (91 m)	On September 26, 1894, while bound from Duluth, Minnesota for Ogdensburg, New York with a cargo of corn, when she was rammed and sunk by the schooner Ironton, which also sank.	45.484152°N 83.484199°W	Not listed	
Oscar T. Flint	Wooden steam barge	1889	1909	30 feet (9.1 m)	On November 25, 1909, Oscar T. Flint caught fire, burned to the waterline and sank east of Thunder Bay River.	45.026133°N 83.347383°W	Not listed	
Persian	Wooden schooner	1855	1868	168 feet (51 m)	On September 16, 1868, Persian was upbound with a cargo of wheat, when she was hit by the schooner E. B. Allen, which tried to pass her. The captain of E. B. Allen reported seeing Persian head for land. She eventually sank, killing all on board.	45.69935°N 84.1529°W	Not listed	
Pewabic	Wooden steamer	1863	1865	182 feet (55 m)	On August 9, 1865, Pewabic was bound from Houghton, Michigan for Cleveland, Ohio with a cargo of iron ore, copper and passengers when she was rammed and sunk by her sister ship, Meteor. Pewabic eventually sank with the loss of about 125 lives.	44.964722°N 83.103889°W	Listed	
Portland	Wooden schooner	1863	1877	6 feet (1.8 m)	Portland ran aground on October 13, 1877, near Presque Isle, Michigan, and was destroyed by a storm shortly afterwards.	45.248817°N 83.4075°W	Not listed	
Portsmouth	Wooden steamer	1853	1867	8 feet (2.4 m)	On November 15, 1867, Portsmouth was bound from Marquette, Michigan for Buffalo, New York with a load of pig iron, when she ran aground on Middle Island and broke up.	45.197056°N 83.335556°W	Not listed	
Racer	Wooden schooner	1856	1869	11 feet (3.4 m)	On November 17, 1869, while downbound from Marquette, Michigan with a load of iron ore, Racer went aground southwest of Cheboygan, Michigan, eventually breaking up.	45.581667°N 84.14865°W	Not listed	
Reindeer	Wooden schooner	1860	1895	16 feet (4.9 m)	On October 6, 1895, Reindeer went ashore near Rogers City, Michigan, eventually breaking up.	45.410333°N 83.766433°W	Not listed	
Shamrock	Wooden steam barge	1875	1905	11 feet (3.4 m)	On June 24, 1905, Shamrock became waterlogged, and was towed to and beached in Black River, Michigan. She was later towed to Alpena, Michigan where she was abandoned and scuttled.	45.051283°N 83.4342°W	Not listed	
S.H. Lathrop	Wooden schooner	1856	1902	3 feet (0.91 m)	S.H. Lathrop was abandoned and scuttled near Alpena, Michigan on May 14, 1902.	45.073684°N 83.373175°W	Not listed	
Spud barge	Wooden barge	Unknown	c. 1937	1 foot (0.30 m)	Unidentified wooden barge abandoned sometime in the late 1930s.	45.036567°N 83.267783°W	Not listed	
Steel barge	Steel barge	Unknown	Unknown	92 feet (28 m)	Unidentified steel barge, believed to have foundered sometime in the mid 20th century.	44.976267°N 83.2212°W	Not listed	
Typo	Wooden schooner	1873	1899	195 feet (59 m)	On October 14, 1899, while loaded with a cargo of coal, Typo was rammed and sunk by the steamer W.P. Ketcham, eventually sinking with the loss of five lives.	45.29125°N 83.31585°W	Not listed	
Viator	Steel ocean freighter	1904	1935	188 feet (57 m)	On October 31, 1935, Viator was rammed and sunk by Ormindale off Thunder Bay Island.	44.991333°N 83.03715°W	Not listed	
W. C. Franz	Steel bulk freighter	1901	1934	230 feet (70 m)	On November 21, 1934, W. C. Franz was rammed in a heavy fog by the freighter Edward E. Loomis. She sank with the loss of four lives.	44.647917°N 82.906533°W	Not listed	
W. G. Mason	Wooden tug	1898	1926	13 feet (4.0 m)	W. G. Mason was dismantled, abandoned and scuttled near Rogers City, Michigan in 1926.	45.41065°N 83.747217°W	Not listed	
W. H. Gilbert	Steel bulk freighter	1892	1914	255 feet (78 m)	On May 22, 1914, while heading to Green Bay, Wisconsin with a cargo of coal, W. H. Gilbert was rammed and sunk by the freighter Caldera.	44.836583°N 82.9787°W	Not listed	
William Maxwell	Wooden fish tug	1883	1908	12 feet (3.7 m)	On September 19, 1908, William Maxwell went aground and became a total loss on a reef near Thunder Bay Island.	45.033167°N 83.19155°W	Not listed	
William P. Rend	Wooden barge	1888	1917	17 feet (5.2 m)	On September 22, 1917, William P. Rend foundered off Alpena, Michigan with the loss of no lives.	45.062367°N 83.392583°W	Not listed	
William H. Rounds	Wooden schooner	1875	1905	11 feet (3.4 m)	On May 2, 1905, William H. Rounds ran aground near Black River, Michigan with a cargo of coal, becoming a total loss.	44.836983°N 83.282317°W	Not listed	
William H. Stevens	Wooden schooner	1855	1863	10 feet (3.0 m)	On November 15, 1863, William H. Stevens ran aground between Bird Island and Scarecrow Island, eventually breaking up.	44.896217°N 83.32755°W	Not listed	
W. P. Thew	Wooden steam barge	1884	1909	84 feet (26 m)	On June 22, 1909, while traveling light, W. P. Thew was rammed and sunk by the freighter William Livingston east of Thunder Bay Island.	45.045083°N 83.153417°W	Not listed	

== See also ==
- List of Great Lakes shipwrecks on the National Register of Historic Places
- List of shipwrecks in the Great Lakes
