= List of shipwrecks in June 1849 =

The list of shipwrecks in June 1849 includes ships sunk, foundered, wrecked, grounded, or otherwise lost during June 1849.

== 1 June ==
List of shipwrecks: 1 June 1849
Ship	State	Description
Christina	United Kingdom	The sloop was driven wrecked on a sandbank off Burghead, Aberdeenshire. She was on a voyage from Ballachulish, Inverness-shire to Burghead.

== 2 June ==
List of shipwrecks: 2 June 1849
Ship	State	Description
Christiana	United Kingdom	The schooner ran aground in the Storsund. She was on a voyage from Harwich, Essex to Hammerfest, Norway. She was refloated and taken in to Hammerfest.
Henriette	Norway	The barque ran aground on the Herd Sand, in the North Sea off the coast of County Durham, United Kingdom. She was on a voyage from London to South Shields, County Durham. She was refloated.
Stewart	United Kingdom	The ship sprang a leak and foundered between Barrow Head and the Mull of Galloway. Her crew were rescued. She was on a voyage from Workington, Cumberland and Sunderland, County Durham.

== 4 June ==
List of shipwrecks: 4 June 1849
Ship	State	Description
Achsah	United Kingdom	The brig ran aground in the River Eske. She was on a voyage from Donegal to Philadelphia, Pennsylvania, United States.
Charles	United Kingdom	The schooner ran aground in the Scheldt. She was on a voyage from Newcastle upon Tyne, Northumberland to Antwerp, Belgium. She was refloated.
Clydesdale	United Kingdom	The ship ran aground at Faro, Portugal. She was on a voyage from Cartagena, Spain to Faro. She was refloated and taken in to Faro in a leaky condition.
Enchantress	United States	The fishing schooner was lost on Cape Sable Island. Crew saved.
Euterpe	United Kingdom	The barque was driven ashore north of Tybee Island, Georgia, United States. She was on a voyage from Savannah, Georgia to Liverpool, Lancashire. She was later refloated.
Hebe	United Kingdom	The ship was driven ashore in the Shrewsbury Inlet. She was on a voyage from London to New York, United States. She was refloated.
Joseph R. Pim	United Kingdom	The ship was abandoned in the Atlantic Ocean. Her crew were rescued by William V. Kent (United Kingdom). Joseph R. Pim was on a voyage from the Clyde to Boston, Massachusetts, United States.
St. Andrew	(United Kingdom of Great Britain and Ireland) British North America	The ship was wrecked on Seal Island, Nova Scotia. She was on a voyage from Plymouth, Massachusetts, United States to Arichat, Nova Scotia.
Woodbine	United Kingdom	The ship capsized in a squall at Cape Cove, Newfoundland, British North America.

== 5 June ==
List of shipwrecks: 5 June 1849
Ship	State	Description
Hebe	United Kingdom	The ship ran aground on the Newcombe Sand, in the North Sea off the coast of Suffolk. She was refloated and resumed her voyage.
Shield	United Kingdom	The ship ran aground and was wrecked at the mouth of the Río Grande.
Swallow	United Kingdom	The whaler, a brig was beached the coast of Iceland, having been trapped in ice from 24 March to 2 July. Her crew were rescued. She was on a voyage from Hull, Yorkshire to Greenland. She was declared a total loss.

== 6 June ==
List of shipwrecks: 6 June 1849
Ship	State	Description
Emily	(United Kingdom of Great Britain and Ireland) New Zealand	The schooner was wrecked in Palliser Bay en route from Nelson to Otago, with the loss of all hands.
Graham	United Kingdom	The barque ran aground on the Cross Sand, in the North Sea off the coast of Norfolk. She was refloated and resumed her voyage.
Shield	United Kingdom	The ship ran aground and was wrecked at the mouth of the Rio Grande. She was on a voyage from Cádiz, Spain to the River Grande.
Waterman № 8	United Kingdom	The steamboat suffered a boiler explosion and was beached in the River Thames at Custom House, London. She was on a voyage from Custom House to Woolwich, Kent. All on board survived.

== 7 June ==
List of shipwrecks: 7 June 1849
Ship	State	Description
Jena	Belgium	The brig ran aground in the Blanes Islets, off Port-au-Prince, Haiti. She was on a voyage from Veracruz, Mexico to Port-au-Prince. She was refloated and taken in to Port-au-Prince, where she was condemned.

== 8 June ==
List of shipwrecks: 8 June 1849
Ship	State	Description
Dove	United Kingdom	The ship ran aground on the Scroby Sands, Norfolk. She was on a voyage from Cardiff, Glamorgan to Newcastle upon Tyne, Northumberland. She was refloated and taken in to Great Yarmouth, Norfolk.
Marie Cattarine	France	The ship struck the Isle Brail Rock and was consequently beached. She was on a voyage from Le Croisic, Loire-Inférieure to "Donelau".
Simon Taylor	United Kingdom	The ship was wrecked on the Shingles, off the coast of Kent.

== 9 June ==
List of shipwrecks: 9 June 1849
Ship	State	Description
Diana	United Kingdom	The ship was driven ashore at Milsons Point, New South Wales. She was on a voyage from London to Sydney, New South Wales. She was refloated.

== 10 June ==
List of shipwrecks: 10 June 1849
Ship	State	Description
Teazer	United Kingdom	The ship ran aground at Gibraltar. She was on a voyage from Liverpool, Lancashire to Gibraltar. She was refloated.

== 11 June ==
List of shipwrecks: 11 June 1849
Ship	State	Description
Young Daniel	United Kingdom	The schooner was run down and sunk by the brig Vargas (Spain) mid-way between Ouessant, Finistère, France and the Isles of Scilly with the loss of five of the seven people on board. Survivors were rescued by Lotus (United Kingdom). Young Daniel was on a voyage from Nantes, Loire-Inférieure, France to Tralee, County Kerry.

== 12 June ==
List of shipwrecks: 12 June 1849
Ship	State	Description
Lady Jane	United Kingdom	The whaler was crushed by ice in Melville Bay and sank. Her 50 crew survived.
McLellam	United States	The whaler was crushed by ice in Melville Bay. She was abandoned on 16 June. Her crew survived.
Prince of Wales	United Kingdom	The whaler was crushed by ice and sank in Davis Strait. Her crew survived.
St. Michael	United Kingdom	The tug suffered a boiler explosion and sank at Billingsgate, London. All six people on board survived.
Superior	United Kingdom	The whaler was crushed by ice in Melville Bay and sank. Her crew survived.

== 13 June ==
List of shipwrecks: 13 June 1849
Ship	State	Description
Emma	United Kingdom	The steamship was wrecked at Point Devi, near Masulipatam, India. Her crew were rescued.
John Fielden	United Kingdom	The ship was damaged by fire at Liverpool, Lancashire.
La Lucie	(France) Algeria	The polacca was wrecked on the Sahara coast of Africa. Her eight crew survived. She was on a voyage from Algiers to "Gorea" and the Gambia River.

== 14 June ==
List of shipwrecks: 14 June 1849
Ship	State	Description
Hope	United Kingdom	The ship was driven ashore on the Isle of Wight. She was on a voyage from Charlestown, Cornwall to Antwerp, Belgium. She was refloated the next day and resumed her voyage.
New Orleans	United States	New Orleans in 2016. The sidewheel paddle steamer was wrecked on a reef off the coast of Michigan in Lake Huron's Thunder Bay west of Thunder Bay Island. Her wreck lies in 15 feet (4.6 m) of water at 45.042983°N 83.240417°W.

== 15 June ==
List of shipwrecks: 15 June 1849
Ship	State	Description
Albion	United Kingdom	The brig ran aground on the Middle Ground, off the coast of County Durham. She was on a voyage from London to South Shields, County Durham.
Sisters	United Kingdom	The brig ran aground on the Middle Ground. She was on a voyage from London to South Shields.

== 16 June ==
List of shipwrecks: 16 June 1849
Ship	State	Description
Bee	United Kingdom	The ship ran aground at South Shields, County Durham.
Jean Bart	France	The ship ran aground at South Shields.
Nederward	Netherlands	The ship ran aground and was damaged on the Romer Shoal. She was on a voyage from Rotterdam, South Holland to New York. She was refloated on 10 July and towed in to New York.

== 17 June ==
List of shipwrecks: 17 June 1849
Ship	State	Description
Swallow	United Kingdom	The sloop foundered in the Irish Sea 20 nautical miles (37 km) north of the Liverpool Lightship ( Trinity House). Her crew were rescued. She was on a voyage from Barrow in Furness, Lancashire to Port Talbot, Glamorgan.

== 18 June ==
List of shipwrecks: 18 June 1849
Ship	State	Description
Fancy	United Kingdom	The ship sprang a leak and was beached at Newport, Pembrokeshire. She was on a voyage from Cardiff, Glamorgan to Belfast, County Antrim.

== 19 June ==
List of shipwrecks: 19 June 1849
Ship	State	Description
Gamma	United Kingdom	The ship ran aground off "Buschar", Sweden. She was on a voyage from Memel, Prussia to Sunderland, County Durham. She was refloated.
Gertruida Lammechina	Netherlands	The tjalk was in collision with the schooner Hoffnung (Denmark and foundered off the Brown Bank, in the North Sea with the loss of her captain. She was on a voyage from London, United Kingdom to a Norwegian port.

== 20 June ==
List of shipwrecks: 20 June 1849
Ship	State	Description
Industry	(United Kingdom of Great Britain and Ireland) Van Diemen's Land	The schooner was driven ashore at the mouth of the Hutt River.
Torrington	United Kingdom	The schooner was wrecked near Woosung, China. She was on a voyage from Hong Kong to Woosung.
Vrouw Antje	Belgium	The ship capsized in the "Pegumeroad".

== 21 June ==
List of shipwrecks: 21 June 1849
Ship	State	Description
Empress	United Kingdom	The brigantine was driven ashore at Perth, Swan River Colony.
Energy	United Kingdom	The ship ran aground on the Nash Sands, in the Bristol Channel off the coast of Glamorgan. She was on a voyage from Cardiff, Glamorgan to Liverpool, Lancashire. She was refloated and beached at Breaksea Point, Glamorgan.
Lady Jane	United Kingdom	The whaler was wrecked in Melville Bay. At least 22 crew survived.
Nautilus	United Kingdom	The ship ran aground off Crosshaven, County Cork and was damaged. She was on a voyage from Thessaloniki, Greece to Crosshaven.
Rose	United Kingdom	The ship was driven ashore on Rügen, Prussia. She was on a voyage from Colberg to Hull, Yorkshire. She was refloated and taken in to Stralsund in a leaky condition.

== 22 June ==
List of shipwrecks: 22 June 1849
Ship	State	Description
Cabrass	United Kingdom	The ship was wrecked in the Bay of Bengal with some loss of life.
Emperor	United Kingdom	The ship ran aground and broke her back in the Charles River, Province of Canada, British North America.
Hillechine	Prussia	The kuff was driven ashore near "Tialtring", Denmark. Her crew were rescued. She was on a voyage from London, United Kingdom to Memel.
Hoffnung	Kingdom of Hanover	First Schleswig War: The koff was driven ashore at "Klitmoller", Denmark. She was subsequently declared a prize by Denmark.
Mervin	United Kingdom	The ship was driven ashore at Leba, Prussia.
Sarah	(United Kingdom of Great Britain and Ireland) Grenada	The cutter was wrecked in Marquis Bay.
Victoria	United Kingdom	The ship ran aground and was wrecked at "Sadur Kadur", India with the loss of four of her crew. She was on a voyage from Amherst, Burma to Calcutta, India.

== 23 June ==
List of shipwrecks: 23 June 1849
Ship	State	Description
Fishers	United Kingdom	The sloop ran aground and sank on the Middle Bank. Her crew were rescued.
Gateshead Park	United Kingdom	The ship ran aground on the Kentish Knock. She was on a voyage from Newcastle upon Tyne to Palma, Mallorca, Spain. She was refloated the next day and taken in to Margate, Kent.
Johanna	Denmark	The ship was driven ashore near Ringkøbing. She was on a voyage from London, United Kingdom to a port in Zealand.
Jonge Dirk	Netherlands	The ship was driven ashore near "Hunshy Kilt", Denmark. All on board were rescued. She was on a voyage from Amsterdam, North Holland to Rostock.
Sally	United Kingdom	The schooner ran aground off Borstahusen, Sweden. She was refloated the next day and taken in to Landskrona, Sweden.

== 24 June ==
List of shipwrecks: 24 June 1849
Ship	State	Description
Antina Tjakkel	Netherlands	The schooner was driven ashore and sank at the entrance to the Agger Canal. Her crew were rescued. She was on a voyage from London, United Kingdom to a Baltic port.
Lowjee Family	India	The full-rigged ship was destroyed by fire at Bombay.
Providence	United Kingdom	The smack was in collision with London Merchant (United Kingdom) and foundered off the Mouse Lightship ( Trinity House), in the North Sea. Her crew were rescued. She was on a voyage from Middlesbrough, Yorkshire to Rochester, Kent.
William Horatio	(United Kingdom of Great Britain and Ireland) British North America	The ship was driven ashore in Broad Cove, Cape Breton Island, Nova Scotia. She was on a voyage from Saint John's, Newfoundland to Cork. She was consequently condemned.

== 25 June ==
List of shipwrecks: 25 June 1849
Ship	State	Description
Agricola	United Kingdom	The ship ran aground in the River Thames at Erith, Kent. She was on a voyage from London to Sydney, New South Wales. She was refloated and put in to Gravesend, Kent.

== 26 June ==
List of shipwrecks: 26 June 1849
Ship	State	Description
Kate	United Kingdom	The smack was run into by the sloop Hercules (United Kingdom) and was severely damaged off the coast of Lincolnshire.

== 27 June ==
List of shipwrecks: 27 June 1849
Ship	State	Description
Charles Bartlett	United States	The barque was run down and sunk in the Atlantic Ocean (50°49′N 29°30′W) by Europa (United Kingdom) with the loss of 104 of her 134 passengers. Ten of her fourteen crew were also rescued. Charles Bartlett was on a voyage from London, United Kingdom to New York.
Milford	United Kingdom	The ship was driven ashore and wrecked on the east coast of Barbados. She was on a voyage from Liverpool, Lancashire to Barbaodes.

== 28 June ==
List of shipwrecks: 28 June 1849
Ship	State	Description
Ellen	United Kingdom	The ship was in collision with an Imperial Russian Navy man-of-war 15 nautical miles (28 km) east of Falsterbo, Sweden. Her crew were rescued. She was on a voyage from Memel, Prussia to London. Ellen was taken in to Nexø, Denmark on 30 June in a waterlogged condition.
Flott	Bremen	The ship was wrecked off "Porto Plata". She was on a voyage from Hull, Yorkshire, United Kingdom to Porto Plata.

== 29 June ==
List of shipwrecks: 29 June 1849
Ship	State	Description
Charlotte	United Kingdom	The schooner sank at the mouth of the Orne.
Edward	United Kingdom	The ship sank at the mouth of the Orne.
Redwing	United Kingdom	The brig was abandoned in the Atlantic Ocean. Her crew were rescued by Eliza (United Kingdom).

== 30 June ==
List of shipwrecks: 30 June 1849
Ship	State	Description
Ceres	United Kingdom	The whaler was lost in the Osprey Channel off Cape Melville, New South Wales. Her 29 crew were rescued on 17 July by the barques Cadet and Symmetry (both United Kingdom).
Constant	United Kingdom	The ship was driven ashore at Memel, Prussia. She was on a voyage from Sunderland, County Durham to Memel.
Eugene	Belgium	The ship departed from Vlissingen, Zeeland, Netherlands for Newcastle upon Tyne, Northumberland, United Kingdom. No further trace, presumed foundered in the North Sea with the loss of all hands.
Hoffnung	Kingdom of Hanover	First Schleswig War: The tjalk was driven ashore at Harboøre, Denmark. She was on a voyage from Rhauderfehn to Brevig, Barra, Outer Hebrides, United Kingdom. She was subsequently declared a prize by Denmark.
Mary Matthew	United Kingdom	The ship ran aground at Gibraltar. She was on a voyage from Alexandria, Egypt to Cork. She was refloated.
Precursor	United Kingdom	The ship ran aground at Gibraltar. She was on a voyage from Alexandria to Falmouth, Cornwall. She was refloated.

=== Unknown date ===
List of shipwrecks: Unknown date in June 1849
Ship	State	Description
Amelia	Austrian Empire	The barque was wrecked at "Continbuga", Brazil before 3 June.
Ann	United Kingdom	The ship was driven ashore in the Dardanelles. She had been refloated by 14 June.
Barkhill	United Kingdom	The ship was driven ashore near Pernambuco, Brazil before 4 June. She was refloated on 14 June.
Enterprise	(United Kingdom of Great Britain and Ireland) British North America	The brig was abandoned in the Atlantic Ocean. She was towed in to Flores Island, Azores in late June.
Esop, or Usuff	United Kingdom	The brig was driven ashore north of Rangoon, Burma before 29 June.
Mary Jane	United Kingdom	The ship foundered in the Atlantic Ocean before 26 June. All on board were rescued by the brig Brothers (United Kingdom). Mary Jane was on a voyage from Bristol, Gloucestershire to Boston, Massachusetts, United States.
Nederwaard	Netherlands	The barque ran aground on the Romer Shoals, in the Atlantic Ocean off the coast of New York, United States. She was on a voyage from Rotterdam, South Holland to New York City, United States.
Patriot	(United Kingdom of Great Britain and Ireland) New Zealand	The whaler, a brig, was lost in Hawkes Bay during a storm. Her crew were rescued.
Sarah Chune	United States	The brigantine was abandoned in the Atlantic Ocean before 6 June.
Sea Flower	United Kingdom	The ship was wrecked west of Eastbourne, Sussex.
Scindian	United Kingdom	The ship was driven ashore at the Cape of Good Hope, Cape Colony before 23 June. She was refloated with the assistance of the steamship Phoenix (United Kingdom).
Torrington	United Kingdom	The schooner was wrecked near Woosung, China. She was on a voyage from Hong Kong to Woosung.
