= MV Nordmeer =

Shipwreck in Lake Huron, Michigan, United States

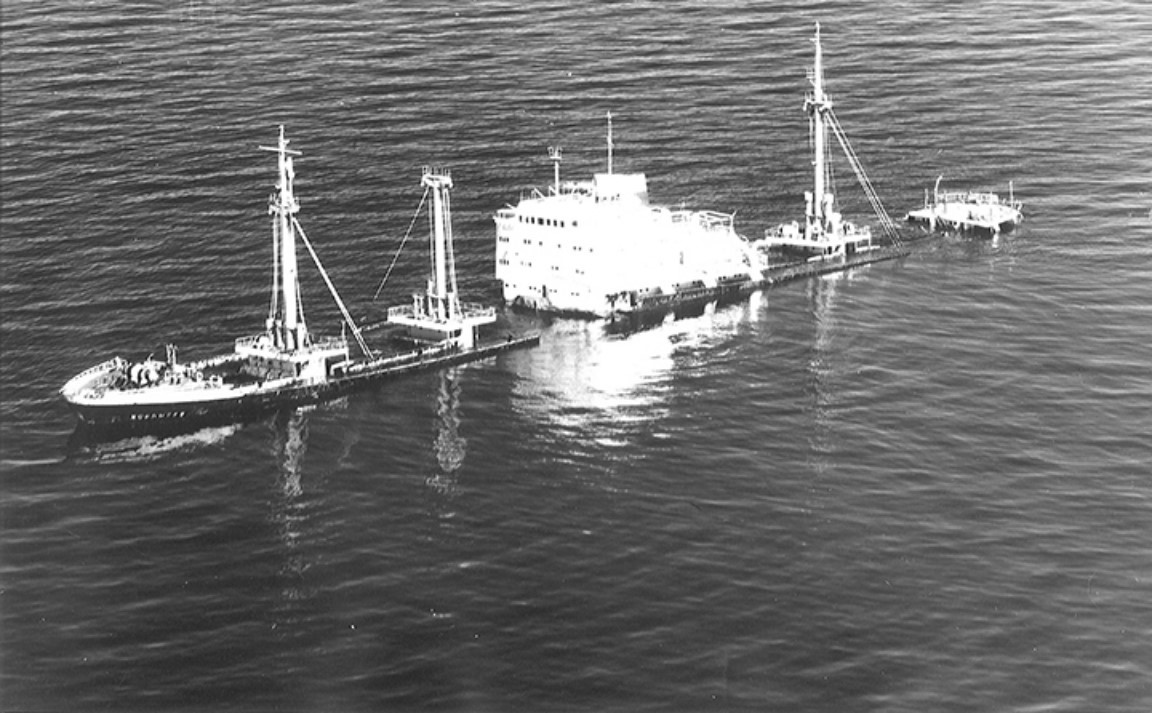
- Nordmeer aground

History

West Germany
- Name: Nordmeer
- Operator: Flensburger Schiffs Gesellshaft
- Builder: Flensburger Schiffs Gesellshaft, Flensburg, West Germany
- Launched: 1954
- Completed: 1954
- In service: 1954
- Out of service: November 19, 1966
- Identification: LR525650
- Fate: Wrecked in Lake Huron on November 19, 1966
- Notes: First ocean-going cargo vessel to wreck in Thunder Bay

General characteristics
- Type: Steel ocean general cargo freighter
- Tonnage: 8,683 GRT
- Length: 471 ft (144 m)
- Beam: 60 ft 9 in (18.52 m)
- Draft: 28 ft 2 in (8.59 m)
- Depth: 28 ft 2 in (8.59 m)
- Propulsion: Diesel engine
- Capacity: General freight (rolled steel)
- Crew: 45
- Notes: Cargo of 990 coils of rolled steel; first freshwater voyage

MV Nordmeer was a West German ocean freighter built in 1954 by Flensburger Schiffbau-Gesellschaft in Flensburg, West Germany. The 471-foot, 8,683-ton steel vessel operated as a general cargo ship and was on its first voyage into the Great Lakes when it wrecked on a reef in Lake Huron near Thunder Bay Island, Michigan, on November 19, 1966.

== Description ==
Nordmeer measured approximately 471 feet (144 m) in length, with a beam of 60 feet 9 inches (18.52 m) and a depth of 28 feet 2 inches (8.59 m). Her gross tonnage was 8,683 tons. The steel-hulled vessel was powered by a large diesel engine driving a single screw propeller. Built by Flensburger Schiffs Gesellshaft, she was designed as an ocean-going general cargo freighter. Her final voyage carried 990 coils of rolled steel bound from Hamburg, Germany, to Chicago and Milwaukee, via the newly completed Saint Lawrence Seaway.

== History ==
On November 19, 1966, Nordmeer was traveling westbound through Lake Huron toward Chicago. The night was clear when the ship, about seven miles north of Thunder Bay Island, turned the wrong side of the flashing buoy marking Thunder Bay Shoal. Her steel hull struck the rocky shoal and came to rest abruptly. Within minutes, all five cargo holds and the engine room flooded. The vessel settled on the bottom, resting partially above water in about 22 feet (6.7 m) of water.

Thirty-seven of the 45 crew members abandoned ship and were rescued by the freighter Samuel Mather and later transferred to the USCGC Mackinaw. The captain and seven crew members remained aboard to supervise salvage operations. Nordmeer was considered salvageable, but a week later, on November 26, 1966, gale-force winds up to 50 mph and 22-foot waves pounded the ship. The remaining crew were evacuated by Coast Guard helicopter as the vessel began to break apart.

== Salvage and environmental concerns ==
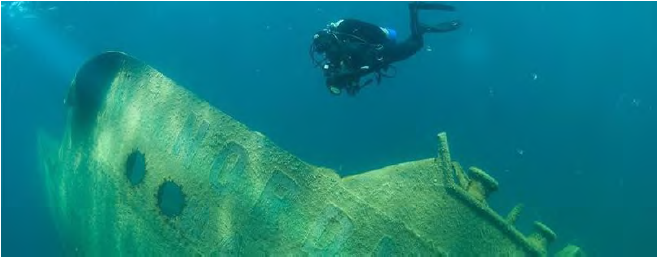
Wreck of MV Nordmeer

In the years following the wreck, portions of Nordmeer's valuable cargo were salvaged. The Philadelphia-based Glen Steel Company recovered nearly 989 steel coils, each weighing around ten tons, in a six-month operation during 1968. The ship's remaining 21,000 gallons of fuel posed a pollution risk to the Thunder Bay area. Between 1969 and 1970, divers under Bob Massey and Dave Funk successfully removed the remaining fuel, with each tank being vented by controlled detonations to ensure complete drainage.

For many years, large sections of Nordmeer remained visible above the lake's surface. By the late 1990s, storms and ice had reduced her to a mostly submerged wreck. Today, she rests fully underwater in about 40 feet (12 m) of water.

== The wreck ==
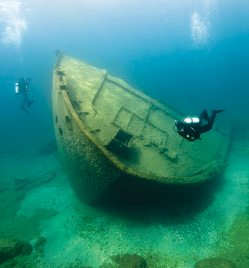
Nordmeer bow

The wreck of Nordmeer lies at coordinates 45°08.161′N 83°09.586′W, approximately seven miles north of Thunder Bay Island in Lake Huron. The large diesel engine and portions of the steel hull remain visible to divers. A steel salvage barge rests alongside the wreck, a relic from early recovery efforts. The site is now protected within the Thunder Bay National Marine Sanctuary, where it remains one of the sanctuary's most visited dive sites. Artifacts from the Nordmeer are displayed at the Great Lakes Maritime Heritage Center in Alpena, Michigan.

== See also ==
- List of shipwrecks in the Thunder Bay National Marine Sanctuary
- Thunder Bay National Marine Sanctuary
