= M. F. Merrick (schooner) =

Shipwreck in Lake Huron, Michigan, United States

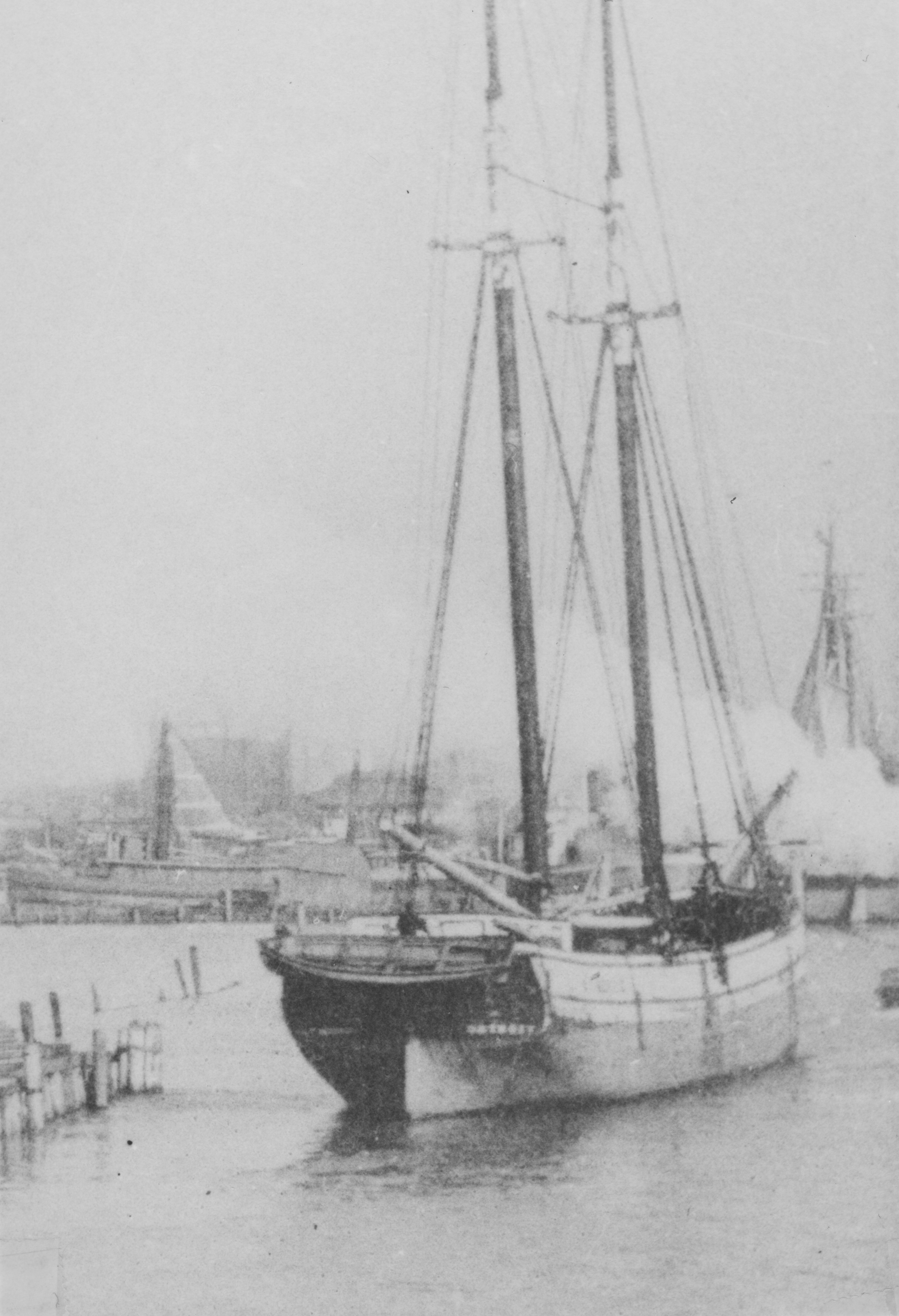

History

United States
- Name: M. F. Merrick
- Builder: John Oades
- Launched: 1863
- Completed: 1863
- In service: 1863–1889
- Out of service: 17 May 1889
- Fate: Collided and sunk in Lake Huron off Presque Isle
- Notes: Official number 16342

General characteristics
- Type: Wooden two‑masted schooner
- Tonnage: 295 GRT
- Length: 139 feet (42 m)
- Beam: 26 feet (7.9 m)
- Draught: 11 feet 10 inches (3.61 m)
- Crew: 7 (5 lost)

M. F. Merrick was a wooden two‑masted schooner built in 1863 by John Oades in Clayton, New York, for Fowler & Esseltyne and later part of the Reindeer Line of Detroit. She measured approximately 139 ft in length, 26 ft in beam, and had a gross tonnage of about 295 GRT.

== Description ==
M. F. Merrick was constructed of wood with a single deck and two masts, typical of “canaller” schooners built to transit the Welland Canal. Her hull measured about 137×25×11 ft and was rated at 295 gross tons.

== History ==
Enrolled at French Creek, NY in 1863, she was remeasured to 295.4 GRT in 1864 and later registered in Detroit. She underwent repairs and had her deck rebuilt in April 1877 and again in 1872.

== Sinking ==
On 16 May 1889, M. F. Merrick departed Port Austin, Michigan, laden with furnace sand. In dense fog off Presque Isle she collided with the steamer R. P. Ranney around midnight. The steamer punctured her port side, and she sank in under a minute, resulting in the deaths of five of her seven crew; the captain and one seaman were rescued.

== Wreck ==
The wreck was rediscovered in 2011 by NOAA's Project Shiphunt, an expedition involving high‑school students and technologies supported by Sony and Intel, using sonar and 3D imaging.

She lies upright in approximately 321 ft of cold, fresh water at coordinates 45°28.22457′N 83°26.77704′W, preserved with intact steering equipment, rigging, and sand cargo.

== Legacy ==
M. F. Merrick is regarded as an important example of late 19th‑century Great Lakes schooners and a notable deep‑water wreck in the Thunder Bay National Marine Sanctuary, visited by technical divers and researchers.

== See also ==
- List of shipwrecks in the Thunder Bay National Marine Sanctuary
