= SS Viator =

Shipwreck in Lake Huron, Michigan, United States

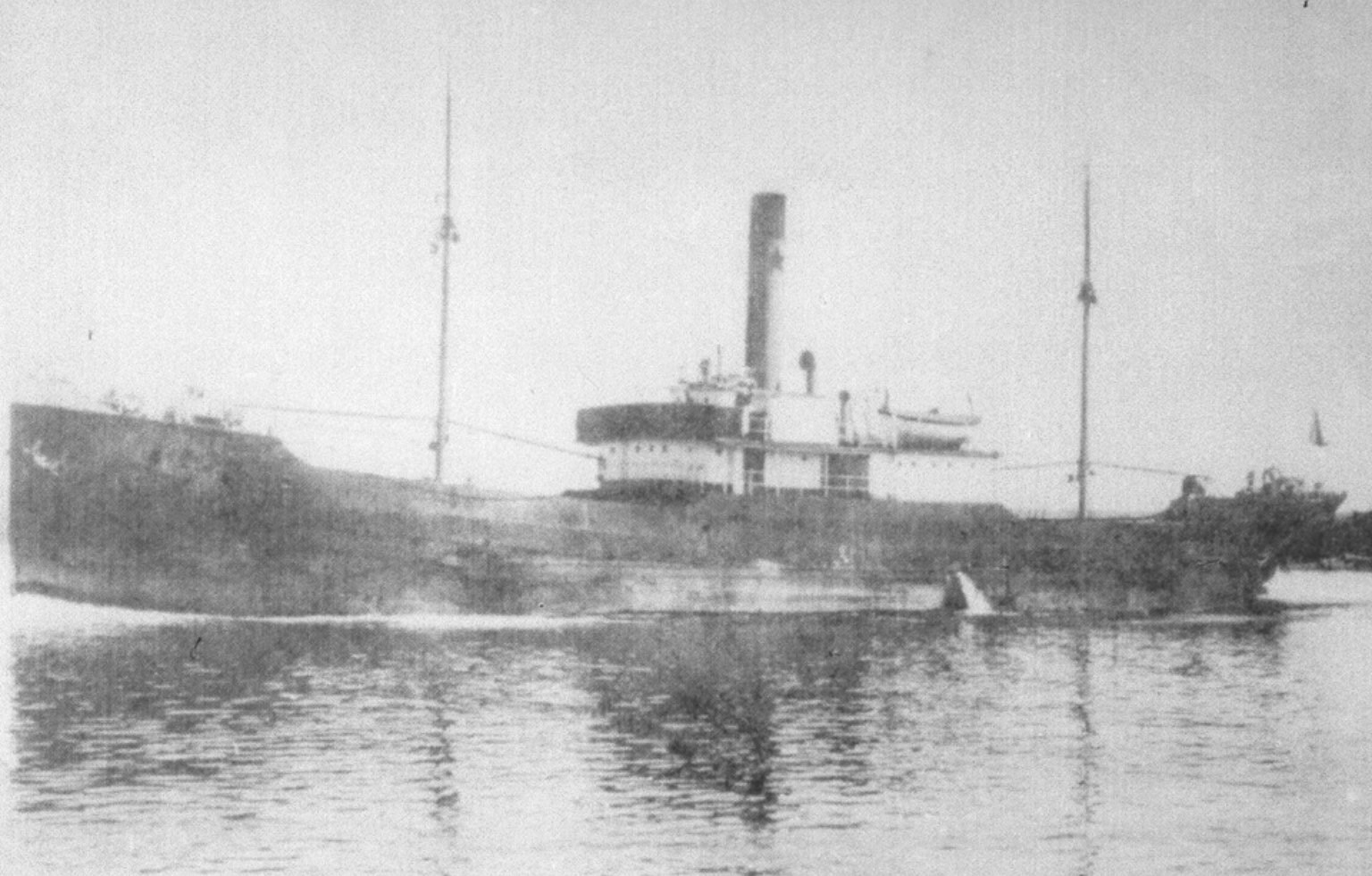

History

Norway
- Name: Viator
- Operator: Dampskibsselskabet A/S Svithun
- Builder: Stavanger Støberi & Dok
- Yard number: 46
- Launched: 1904
- Completed: 1904
- In service: 1904
- Out of service: 1935
- Identification: Official Number: 5602348; Callsign: MBTD / LFGH
- Fate: Wrecked in Lake Huron October 31, 1935

General characteristics
- Type: General cargo steamship
- Tonnage: 983 GRT
- Length: 232 ft (71 m)
- Beam: 33 ft (10 m)
- Draught: 15.3 ft (4.7 m)
- Installed power: Triple-expansion steam engine, 122 nhp
- Propulsion: Single screw
- Speed: 11.5 knots (21.3 km/h; 13.2 mph)
- Capacity: ~ 80,000 cu ft (2,300 m^{3})

SS Viator was a Norwegian steam-powered ocean-going cargo vessel built in 1904. She was lost on October 31, 1935, following a collision in thick fog with the freighter Ormindale northeast of Thunder Bay Island in Lake Huron. The wreck lies upright and largely intact on the lake bottom, making it a popular diving site.

== Description ==
Viator was constructed by Stavanger Støberi & Dok in Stavanger, Norway. She was a general cargo steamship with a registered length of 232 feet (71 m), a beam of 33.3 feet (10.1 m), and a draft of 15.3 feet (4.7 m). Her gross register tonnage was 983 tons and net register tonnage 619 tons. She was powered by a triple-expansion steam engine producing 122 nominal horsepower, which enabled a top speed of 11.5 knots (21.3 km/h; 13.2 mph). She had a cargo capacity of approximately 80,000 cubic feet (2,300 m^{3}) feet and featured mechanical ventilation, four booms, and four winches for cargo handling.

== History ==
Viator was launched in 1904 for Dampskibsselskabet A/S Svithun of Stavanger, managed by Holdt & Isachsen. The vessel operated mainly in the fruit trade, chartered by American companies for transport between Caribbean nations or Central America and the United States. In 1921, she was refitted with a new boiler manufactured by Cammell Laird & Co. Ltd. in Birkenhead, England. In 1933, she was sold to D/S A/S Vestfart of Bodø, Norway, under the management of Erling Sannes.

== Sinking ==
On October 31, 1935, while en route from Oslo, Norway, to Chicago, Illinois, with a cargo of general goods including pickled herring and other fish products, Viator collided with the American freighter Ormindale in dense fog approximately 8 nautical miles (15 km; 9.2 mi) from the Thunder Bay Lighthouse in Lake Huron. The collision caused significant hull damage, and Viator sank in deep water shortly afterward. There were no reported fatalities.

== The wreck ==
The wreck of Viator rests at a depth of approximately 188 feet (57 m) at coordinates 44°59.480′N 83°2.229′W. The vessel sits upright on the lake bottom and is mostly intact aside from the area of collision. Boxes of preserved cargo, including pickled herring, remain visible in the hold. The site is a notable dive destination in the Thunder Bay National Marine Sanctuary and has been documented using sonar and underwater photography.

== See also ==
- List of shipwrecks in the Thunder Bay National Marine Sanctuary
