= E. B. Allen (schooner) =

Shipwreck in Lake Huron, Michigan, United States

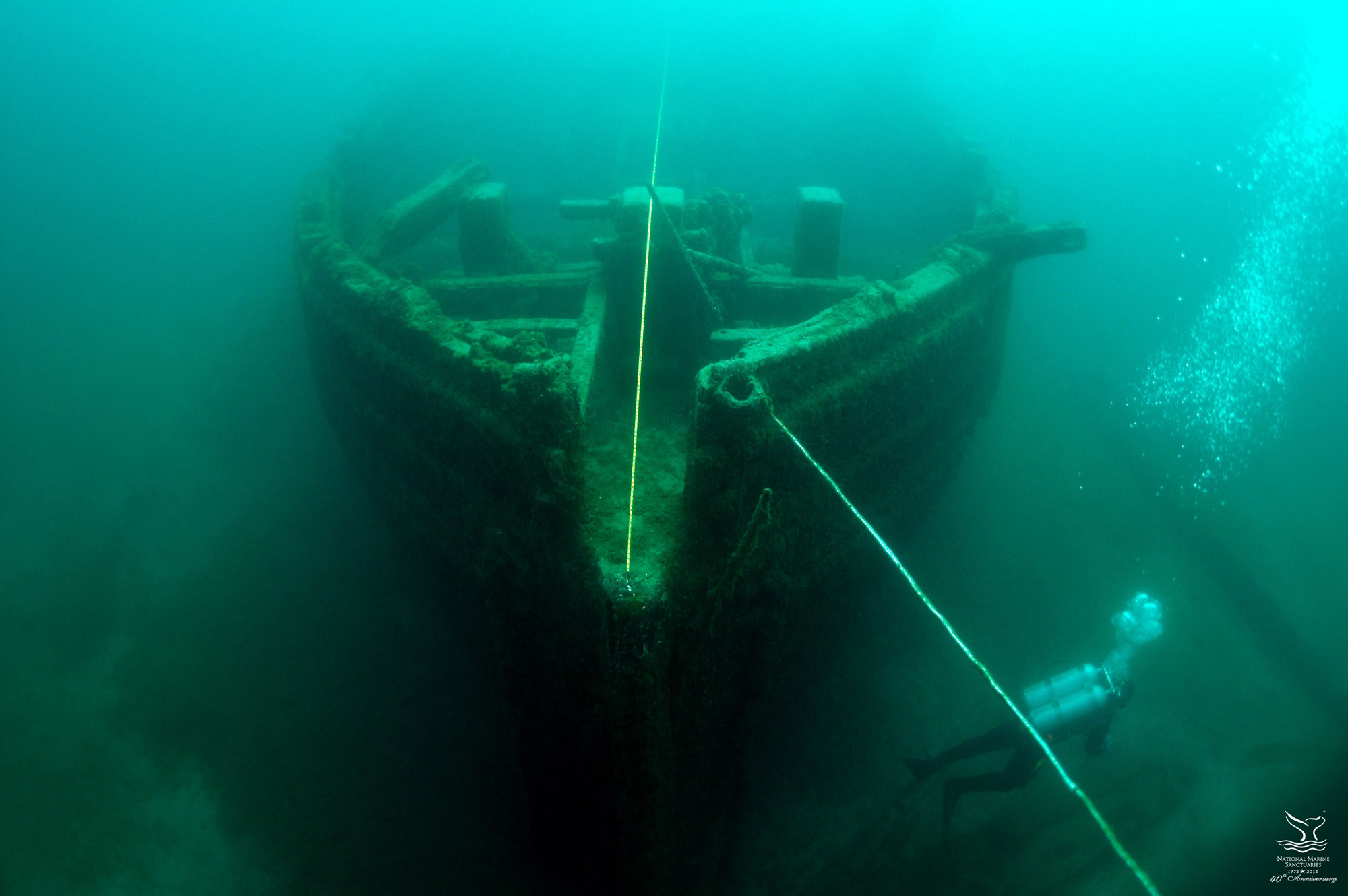
- Wreck of the E. B. ALlen

History

United States
- Name: E. B. Allen
- Operator: E. B. Allen & Son
- Builder: Harrison C. Pearson
- Launched: 1864
- Completed: 1864
- Acquired: 1864
- In service: 1864
- Out of service: 1871
- Identification: Official Number: 7818
- Fate: Collision with Newsboy and sank in Lake Huron in 1871

General characteristics
- Type: Wooden two-masted schooner
- Tonnage: 275 GRT
- Length: 134 ft (41 m)
- Beam: 26 ft (7.9 m)
- Draught: 11.2 ft (3.4 m)
- Propulsion: Sail

E. B. Allen was a wooden two-masted schooner built in 1864 in Ogdensburg, New York by Harrison C. Pearson. A purpose-built canal schooner, she was designed to maximize grain cargo on voyages through the Great Lakes and the canal systems. In 1871 (on 18 September, 18 November or 20 November), while en route to Buffalo, New York, with a load of corn, E. B. Allen collided with the bark Newsboy in heavy fog off Thunder Bay Island, Michigan. The ship quickly sank, though the entire crew was rescued. The wreck was rediscovered in the 1970s and sits upright in 100 feet of water within the Thunder Bay National Marine Sanctuary.

== Description ==
E. B. Allen was a wooden schooner measuring approximately 134 feet (41 m) in length, with a beam of 26 feet (7.9 m) and a draught of 11.2 feet (3.4 m). Her gross tonnage was 275. Designed as a “canaler,” she featured a boxy hull to maximize cargo within the dimensional limits of 19th-century canal locks. Innovative design elements such as folding bowsprits and compact rigging allowed her to navigate narrow waterways while still carrying large volumes of bulk cargo—primarily grain.

== History ==
Launched in 1864 for the firm E. B. Allen & Son of Ogdensburg, New York, E. B. Allen was enrolled that year and began service transporting bulk cargo across the Great Lakes. Her design was optimized for canal and lock passage, enabling efficient shipment of grain from the American Midwest to eastern ports. Like many schooners of her class, she operated under sail alone, with two masts and a flat bottom augmented by a centerboard to improve tracking.

== Sinking ==
In 1871 (on 18 September, 18 November or 20 November), E. B. Allen was sailing eastbound from Chicago to Buffalo with a cargo of grain. While navigating near Thunder Bay Island in Lake Huron, the vessel entered a dense fog. Around two miles southeast of the island, she collided with the westbound bark Newsboy. The impact tore a large hole in Allen’s port side. Although the ship sank quickly, the entire crew was rescued by the crew of Newsboy. Reports differ slightly on visibility conditions—while some accounts mention fog, others note it was a clear, moonlit night.

== The wreck ==
The wreck of E. B. Allen lies in 100 feet (30 m) of water at coordinates 45°00.976′N 83°09.899′W. The ship rests upright and remains largely intact, though the masts are broken and much of the decking is missing. Divers can observe structural features such as the centerboard trunk, rudder post, folding catheads, and the gash in the port side hull from the collision. The site is moored with NOAA buoy #37 and is a popular dive destination within the Thunder Bay National Marine Sanctuary.

== See also ==
- List of shipwrecks in the Thunder Bay National Marine Sanctuary
