= Corsican (schooner) =

Shipwreck in Lake Huron, Michigan, United States

Coordinates: 44°54.760′N 83°03.300′W

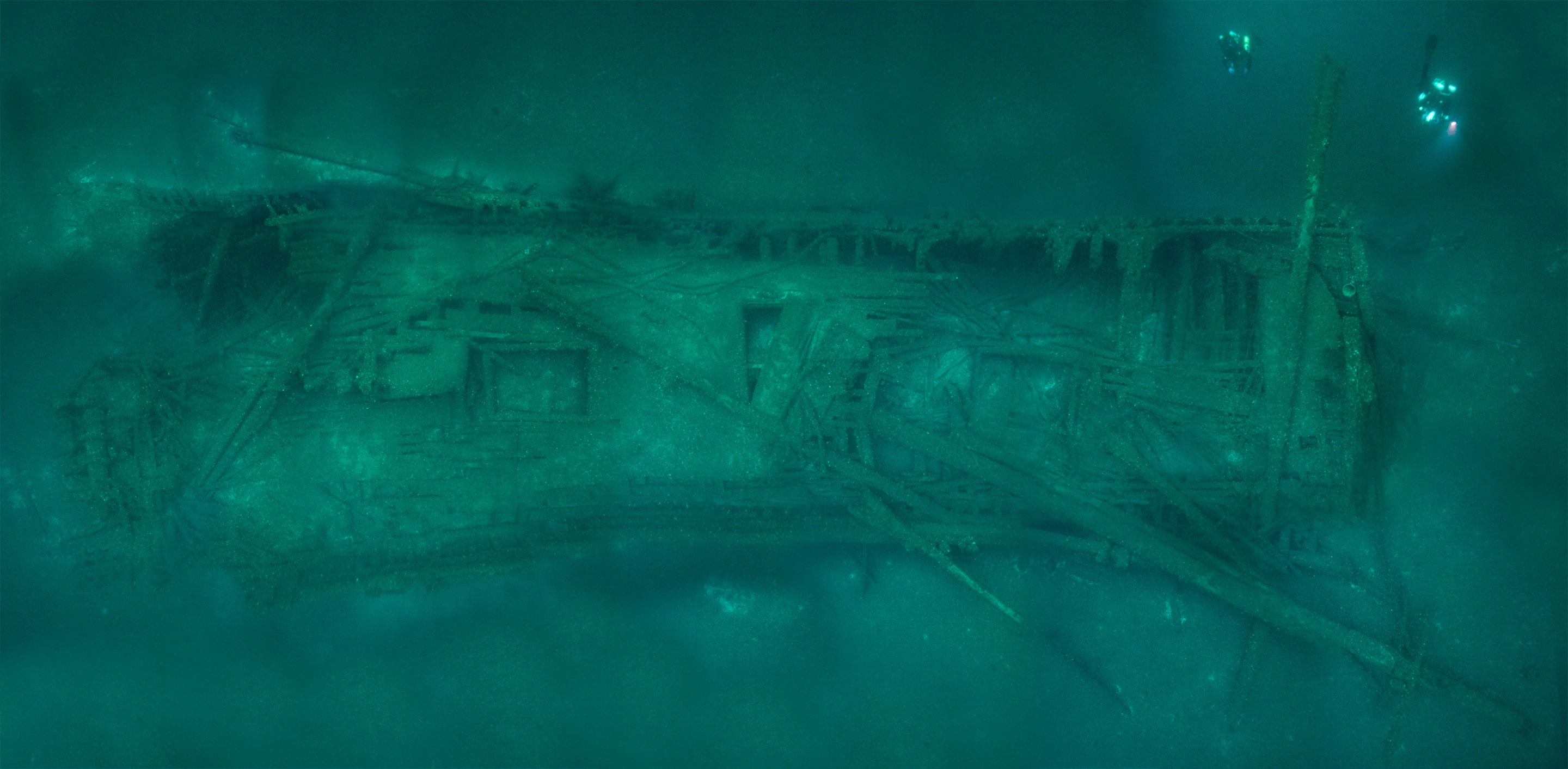
- Wreck of the Corsican

History

United States
- Name: Corsican
- Builder: H. Rogers
- Launched: 1862
- Completed: 1862
- In service: 1862
- Out of service: June 1–2, 1893
- Identification: Official number 4922
- Fate: Sunk after collision June 1893
- Notes: Wooden two-masted schooner carrying coal; all hands lost

General characteristics
- Type: Wooden two-masted schooner
- Tonnage: 210 GRT
- Length: 112 ft (34 m)
- Beam: 25 ft (7.6 m)
- Depth: 10 ft (3.0 m)
- Propulsion: Sail
- Capacity: Coal (≈14,000 bushels)
- Crew: 6 (lost)
- Notes: Launched at Olcott, New York (1862); wreck lies at about 160 ft.

Corsican was a wooden two-masted schooner launched in 1862 by H. Rogers at Olcott, New York. The 112-foot (34 m), approximately 210-gross-register-ton vessel was carrying a cargo of coal when she was struck and nearly cut in two by the steel steam barge Corsica off Thunder Bay in Lake Huron in early June 1893; the schooner sank rapidly and all hands were lost.

== Description ==
Corsican was a wooden-hulled, two-masted schooner of approximately 112 feet (34 m) in length, with a beam of about 25 feet (7.6 m) and a depth of roughly 10 feet (3.0 m). Her recorded gross register tonnage is 210. She was employed in the Great Lakes trade; historical records indicate a cargo capacity on the order of 14,000 bushels and that on her final voyage she carried coal.

== Sinking ==
On a foggy morning in early June 1893 the steel steam barge Corsica collided with the schooner Corsican off Thunder Bay in Lake Huron. Sources differ slightly on the exact calendar date (NOAA records the loss as June 1, 1893, while several shipping registries and summaries record June 2, 1893), but all accounts agree that the wooden schooner was nearly cut in two and sank almost immediately with the entire crew lost. The wreck rests at a depth of about 160 ft.

== Wreck site and condition ==
The wreck of Corsican lies within the boundaries of the Thunder Bay National Marine Sanctuary. The site rests in approximately 160 feet (49 m) of water. Photomosaics and site descriptions show the cabin and stern with large sections missing, a collapsed deck and jumbled wreckage, the ship's wheel displaced, and the bow windlass still wrapped with anchor chain; rigged spars and other debris lie atop and adjacent to the hull on the lake bottom.

It lies within the boundaries of the Thunder Bay National Marine Sanctuary.

== See also ==
- Thunder Bay National Marine Sanctuary
- List of shipwrecks in the Thunder Bay National Marine Sanctuary
