= John Shaw (schooner) =

Shipwreck in Lake Huron, Michigan, United States

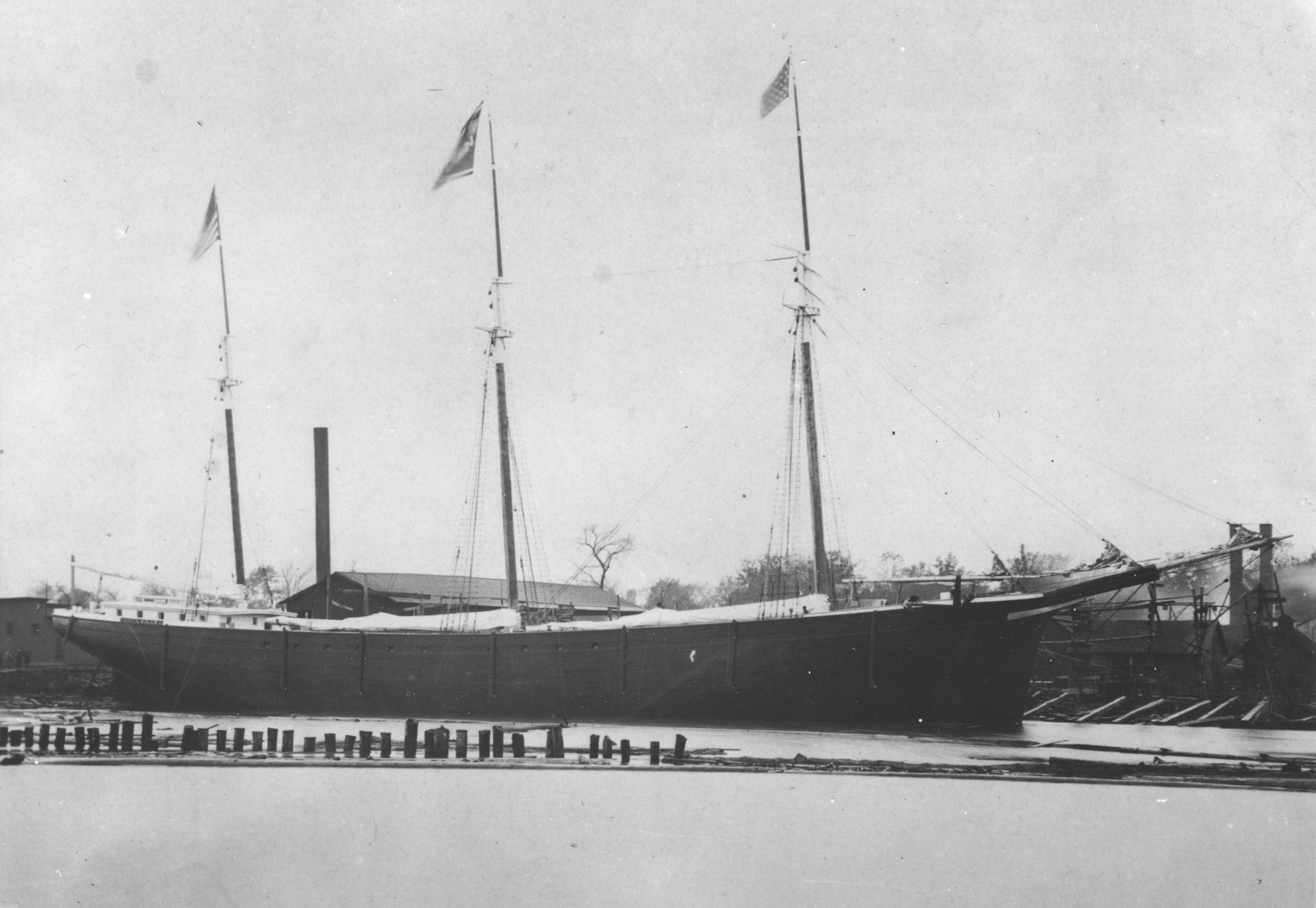

History

United States
- Name: John Shaw
- Operator: Charles A. Eddy
- Builder: James Davidson
- Launched: 1885
- Completed: 1885
- Acquired: 1885
- In service: 1885
- Out of service: 1894
- Identification: Official Number: 76601
- Fate: Foundered in Lake Huron November 13, 1894

General characteristics
- Type: Three-masted wooden schooner
- Tonnage: 928 GRT
- Length: 217 ft (66 m)
- Beam: 39 ft (12 m)
- Draught: 14.3 ft (4.4 m)
- Propulsion: Sail (towed at time of sinking)

John Shaw was a large, three-masted wooden schooner built in 1885 at West Bay City, Michigan. On November 13, 1894, while being towed across Lake Huron by the steam barge John F. Eddy with a cargo of coal, the schooner encountered a snowstorm and foundered off Harrisville, Michigan. The crew survived by abandoning ship and drifting for hours in a lifeboat. The wreck was rediscovered in 2007 and rests upright in 128 feet (39 m) of water in the Thunder Bay National Marine Sanctuary.

== Description ==
John Shaw was a wooden schooner measuring 217 feet (66 m) in length, with a beam of 39 feet (12 m) and a draught of 14.3 feet (4.4 m). She had a gross register tonnage of 928 tons and a net register tonnage of 882 tons. The vessel was built by noted shipbuilder James Davidson at West Bay City, Michigan, and originally owned by Captain John L. Shaw. She featured three masts and was among the larger schooners operating on the Great Lakes during the late 19th century.

== History ==
Launched in 1885, John Shaw was used primarily for bulk cargo transport across the Great Lakes, including coal and other industrial materials. In October 1885, the vessel was owned by Charles A. Eddy. Though designed for sail, it was common for schooners of her size and era to be towed by steam barges for efficiency. This was the case during her final voyage in 1894.

== Sinking ==
On November 13, 1894, while en route to Chicago with a cargo of coal, John L. Shaw was under tow by the steam barge John F. Eddy across Lake Huron. A sudden and severe snowstorm led to a loss of visibility near Harrisville and caused the tow line to part, leaving the schooner adrift in worsening conditions. Taking on water, the crew abandoned ship and escaped in a yawl, drifting for several hours before being rescued by a passing steamer. John Shaw foundered shortly thereafter.

== The wreck ==
The wreck of John Shaw lies at a depth of 128 feet (39 m) at coordinates 44°37.000′N 83°08.000′W, approximately seven miles (11 km) from shore. Discovered in July 2007 by a local fisherman while setting nets, the wreck was found largely intact. The vessel's hull remains upright, though the starboard side has collapsed outward onto the lakebed. Archaeological documentation, including photogrammetry and site plans, revealed well-preserved features such as mast stumps and structural timbers.

== See also ==
- List of shipwrecks in the Thunder Bay National Marine Sanctuary
