= Persian (schooner) =

19th-century Great Lakes schooner

Coordinates: 45°41′57.66″N 84°9′10.44″W

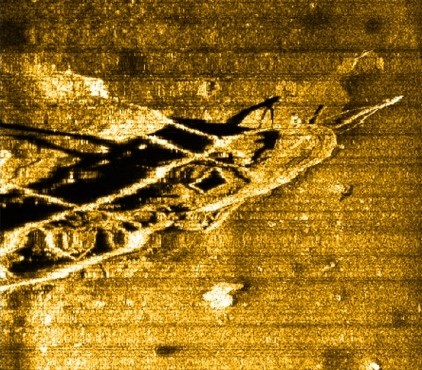
- Sonar image of Persian's wreck

History

United States
- Name: Persian
- Owner: Dunn & Cummings
- Builder: James Baker, Oswego, New York
- In service: 1855
- Out of service: 16 September 1868
- Fate: Sank in a collision on Lake Huron

General characteristics
- Class & type: Schooner
- Tonnage: 345 GRT
- Length: 128 feet (39.0 m)
- Beam: 26 feet (7.9 m)
- Depth: 12 feet (3.7 m)
- Propulsion: 2 × masts

Persian was an American 2–masted schooner built in 1855. She operated on the Great Lakes for 13 years, before sinking in a collision with the schooner E. B. Allen on Lake Huron, on 16 September 1868, while laden with wheat, with the loss of her entire crew. Her wreck was located in 1991, within the boundaries of the Thunder Bay National Marine Sanctuary, in 168 feet (51.2 m) of water.

== History ==
Persian was a two–masted wooden schooner, built by James Baker, under the supervision of master carpenter James Navagh in Oswego, New York, in 1855. Her hull was 128 feet (39.0 m) in length, 26 feet (7.9 m) in beam, and 12 feet (3.7 m). She had a gross register tonnage of 345 tons. She was originally built for Fitzhugh & Littlejohn. She was sold twice; to Dane, Fullington & Company in 1863, and Dunn & Cummings in 1866. All of her owners hailed from Oswego.

== Final voyage ==
On 16 September 1868, Persian was bound from Chicago, Illinois, for Oswego, with a cargo of wheat. Simultaneously, the canal schooner E. B. Allen was upbound, headed for Chicago. As the pair were about 4 miles (6.4 km) north of Presque Isle, E. B. Allen attempted to pass Persian. However, her maneuver dramatically decreased the distance between the two schooners. E. B. Allen struck Persian on her starboard side. The former vessel's crew observed Persian turn towards land, while they resumed their journey to Chicago.

Upon failing to reach her destination, Persian was declared lost, with her entire crew dying in the sinking.

== Wreck ==
The wreck of Persian was located by sports divers in 1991, resting within the boundaries of the Thunder Bay National Marine Sanctuary, in 168 feet (51.2 m) of water. Her hull remains mostly intact, save for the collision damage, where parts of the decking have broken away. While both of her masts have toppled over, her bowsprit remains standing. The area immediately around the wreck is littered with pieces of the aft cabin, and the deck.
