= SS W. P. Thew =

Shipwreck of a wooden steam barge in Lake Huron, Michigan, United States

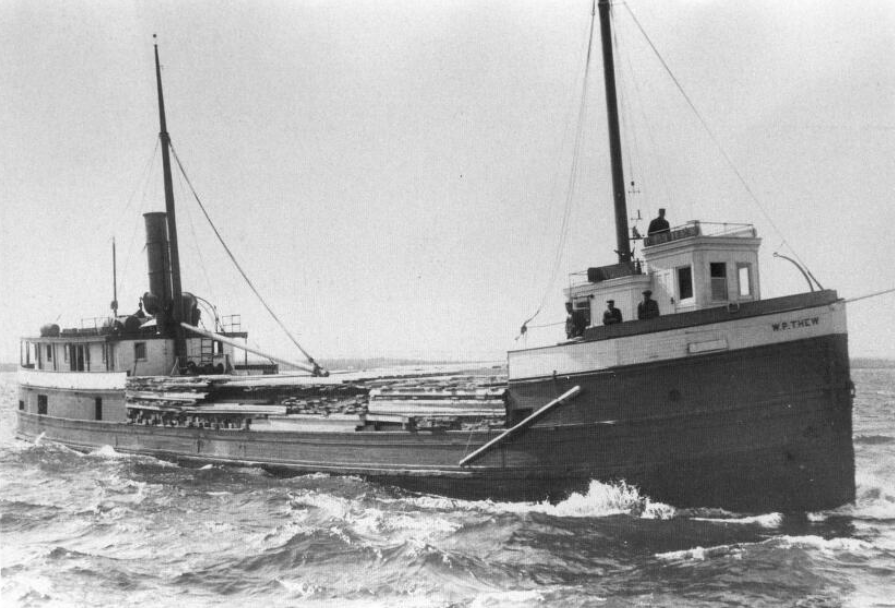

History

United States
- Name: W. P. Thew
- Owner: R. Thew et al (original)
- Operator: Various (later Marine Bank, Cleveland; J. C. Garry, Saginaw; Hugh R. Harvey, Detroit)
- Builder: Henry D. Root
- Launched: 1884
- Completed: 1884
- Identification: Official number 81204
- Fate: Collided with SS William Livingston and sank, 22 June 1909

General characteristics
- Type: Wooden steam barge
- Tonnage: 403 GRT (after 1888 rebuild)
- Length: 132 ft (40 m)
- Beam: 24 ft (7.3 m)
- Depth: 8.4 ft (2.6 m)
- Installed power: 400 hp (300 kW), 2 cylinders, 1 boiler
- Propulsion: Steeple compound steam engine, screw propeller
- Capacity: Lumber, logs, railroad ties, shingles
- Notes: Rebuilt multiple times after fires and sinkings; originally enrolled at Cleveland in 1884

W. P. Thew was a wooden steam barge built in 1884 at Lorain, Ohio, by shipbuilder Henry D. Root, one of the last prominent wooden shipbuilders on the Black River. She was designed to carry forest products such as lumber, logs, shingles, and railroad ties across the Great Lakes.

The wreck is currently a diving site.

== Description ==
W. P. Thew was built by shipbuilder Henry D. Root in 1884, one of the last prominent wooden shipbuilders on the Black River.

W. P. Thew was a single-deck wooden steam barge originally measuring 107 ft (33 m) in length, 23.4 ft (7.1 m) in beam, and 8.4 ft (2.6 m) in depth, with a gross register tonnage of 139. She was powered by a two-cylinder steeple compound steam engine rated at 400 horsepower (300 kW), with one marine firebox boiler and a single screw propeller.

During her career, she was repeatedly rebuilt. In 1886 she was lengthened to 132.5 ft (40.4 m) with a gross register tonnage of 188. In 1888 she was double-decked, reaching 403 gross register tons. The vessel was enrolled at various ports including Cleveland, Bay City, Port Huron, and Detroit as ownership changed.

== Final voyage and sinking ==
On 22 June 1909, W. P. Thew was en route in ballast when she was struck in dense fog by the 545-foot (166 m) steel freighter William Livingston off Thunder Bay Island in Lake Huron. The freighter did not stop after the collision, and the wooden barge sank quickly, though all crew survived. Her enrollment was officially surrendered at Detroit on 30 June 1909.

== The wreck ==
The wreck of W. P. Thew lies in 80 to 84 feet (24 to 26 m) of water approximately 3.5 miles (5.6 km) east of Thunder Bay Island at 45°02.705′N 83°09.205′W. The site consists of scattered remains, including machinery, boilers, deck equipment, and the fantail with the propeller and shaft visible. Divers report burbot and other freshwater species commonly inhabiting the wreck.

== See also ==
- List of shipwrecks in the Thunder Bay National Marine Sanctuary
