= Benjamin Franklin (steamboat) =

Shipwreck of a side-wheel steamer in Lake Huron, Michigan, United States

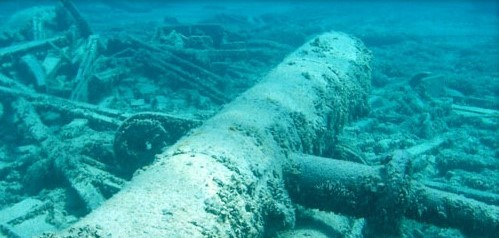
- Wreck site of the Benjamin Franklin

History

United States
- Name: Benjamin Franklin
- Operator: Hiram Burton; later Henry W. Walker of Detroit
- Builder: Gilman Appleby
- Launched: 1842
- Completed: 1842
- Acquired: 1842
- In service: 1842
- Out of service: 1850
- Fate: Ran aground and wrecked at Thunder Bay Island reef in a storm, October 8, 1850

General characteristics
- Type: Wooden sidewheel steamer
- Tonnage: 231 GRT
- Length: 135 ft (41 m)
- Beam: 20 ft (6.1 m)
- Propulsion: Steam, side paddle wheels
- Capacity: Passengers and packet freight
- Notes: Supplies delivery to Thunder Bay Island lighthouse and fishermen

Benjamin Franklin was a wooden side‑wheel steam paddle wheeler built in 1842 by Gilman Appleby in Buffalo, New York. She was owned by Hiram Burton of Buffalo and later by Henry W. Walker of Detroit, and primarily carried passengers and packet freight (notably supplies for the Thunder Bay Island light and local fishermen).

== Description ==
The vessel measured approximately 135 ft in length, with a beam of about 20 ft, and registered at 231 gross tons. Her propulsion was provided by dual side paddle wheels, typical of mid‑19th century Great Lakes steamers.

== History and wreck ==
On October 8, 1850, while en route to resupply the Thunder Bay Island lighthouse, Benjamin Franklin was caught in a sudden storm and ran aground on the limestone reef at the southeast end of Thunder Bay Island. The vessel became stranded and began breaking apart. No lives were lost.

Following the grounding, much of the machinery was stripped ashore. A subsequent storm on November 28 washed away all remaining hull components, scattering wreckage along the shores and underwater.

== The wreck ==
Today, no intact hull remains. Machinery and hardware are widely scattered across depths ranging from 10 to 55 feet. Notable survivors at the site include: Two paddlewheel shafts lying on the lake bottom, each with cast‑iron hubs, one still containing portions of the original wooden spokes; One intact and two partially intact cylindrical boilers located in deeper water and a rudder and rudder post found closer to shore.

Diver access to various artifacts, including boiler fragments, steam machinery, and paddle wheel components, reveals the destructive effects of waves, ice, and currents on the shallow reef site.

GPS location of primary wreck artifacts is approximately N 45° 01.934′ W 83° 11.529′, with additional coordinates recorded for paddlewheel shards and boilers.

== See also ==
- List of shipwrecks in the Thunder Bay National Marine Sanctuary
