= New Orleans (1844 steamboat) =

Shipwreck in Lake Huron, Michigan, United States

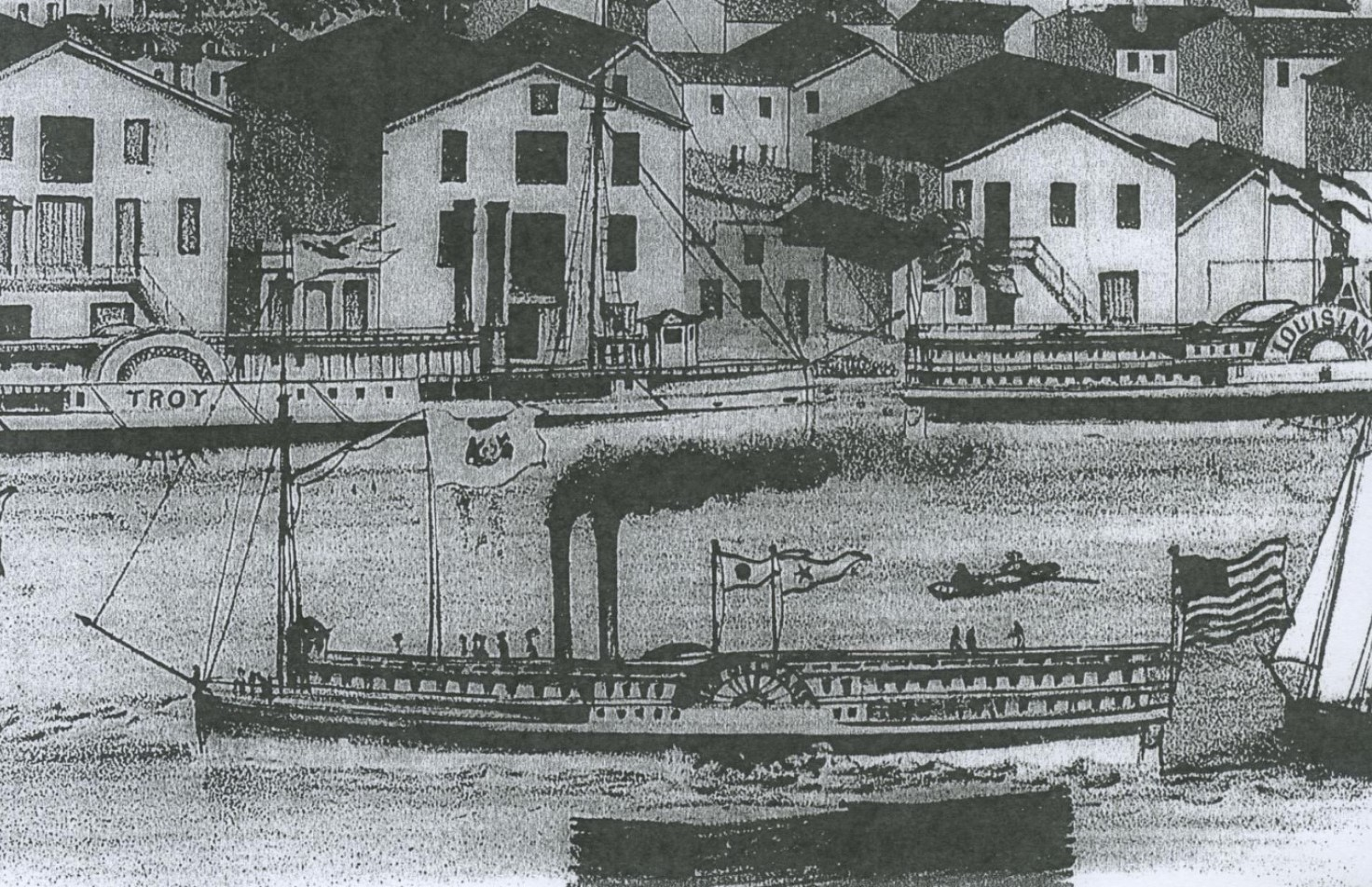

History

United States
- Name: New Orleans
- Operator: Western Transportation Co.
- Builder: Burton F. Goodson (Goodsell)
- Launched: 1844
- Completed: 1844
- In service: 1844
- Out of service: 1849
- Fate: Wrecked in Lake Huron on June 13, 1849
- Notes: Built on the bottom of the earlier steamer Vermillion (1838)

General characteristics
- Type: Wooden sidewheel steamer
- Tonnage: 610 GRT
- Length: 185 ft 4 in (56.49 m)
- Beam: 26 ft 8 in (8.13 m)
- Draft: 12 ft 10 in (3.91 m)
- Depth: 12 ft 10 in (3.91 m)
- Decks: 3
- Installed power: Built by Buffalo Steam Engine Works
- Propulsion: Sidewheel, crosshead engine
- Capacity: Passengers and general freight
- Notes: Originally built as Vermillion (1838); rebuilt and lengthened in 1844 as New Orleans

New Orleans was a wooden Great Lakes sidewheel steamer. It was originally built as Vermillion in 1838 and rebuilt and lengthened as the New Orleans in 1844 by Burton F. Goodson (also known as Goodsell) at Detroit, Michigan. She operated as a passenger and freight steamer for the Western Transportation Company until she stranded in fog and was wrecked on a reef in Lake Huron near Alpena on June 13, 1849.

== Description ==
New Orleans measured approximately 185 feet 4 inches (56.49 m) in length, had a beam of 26 feet 8 inches (8.13 m), and a depth of 12 feet 10 inches (3.91 m). Her gross register tonnage was 610 tons. She was powered by a crosshead steam engine built by Buffalo Steam Engine Works, driving sidewheels. The vessel was originally built on the hull remains of the steamer Vermillion (1838), which had burned in 1842 and was rebuilt two years later as the New Orleans.

== History ==
The sidewheeler New Orleans entered service on May 2, 1844, operated by the Western Transportation Company out of Buffalo, New York. She primarily carried passengers and general freight across the Great Lakes, serving routes between Buffalo, Detroit, and Chicago. Early records show her enrollment at Buffalo on September 13, 1844, and several incidents during her short career, including machinery damage on Lake Erie and groundings in the St. Clair Flats and Detroit River.

== Sinking ==
Before daylight on June 13, 1849, while northbound through Lake Huron, New Orleans ran aground in dense fog on a reef between North Point and Sugar Island, near Alpena, Michigan. Local fishermen rescued all passengers and crew, and much of her cargo was salvaged. The ship later broke apart in the surf and was declared a total loss.

== The wreck ==
The wreck of New Orleans lies in about 15 feet (4.6 m) of water at coordinates 45°02.579′N 83°14.425′W. Large sections of the wooden hull remain preserved by the cold, clear waters of Lake Huron, making the site accessible to snorkelers, kayakers, and divers. Today, the site is part of the Thunder Bay National Marine Sanctuary, where it is a popular shallow-water exploration site. Portions of the hull and machinery are visible from the surface and glass-bottom boat tours.

== See also ==
- List of shipwrecks in the Thunder Bay National Marine Sanctuary
- Thunder Bay National Marine Sanctuary
