= SS D. M. Wilson =

Wooden-hulled American lake freighter

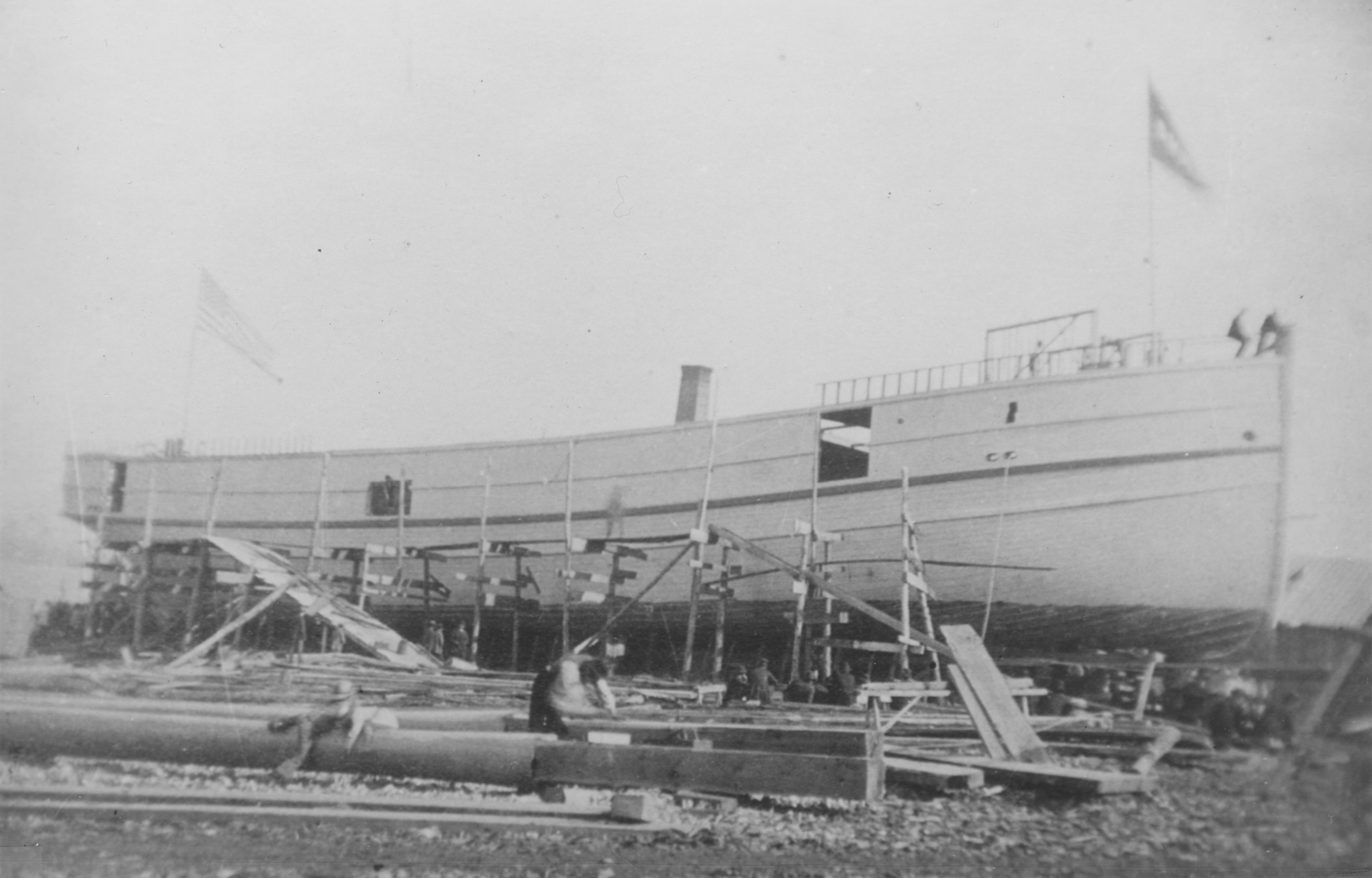
- D. M. Wilson under construction

History

United States
- Name: D. M. Wilson
- Owner: Thomas Wilson (1873–1883); Charles H. Laine (1883–1890); John A. Miller (1890–1894)
- Builder: Simon Langell, St. Clair, Michigan
- Launched: May 1873
- In service: 1873
- Out of service: 27 October 1894
- Identification: US official number 6772
- Fate: Sank on Lake Huron; 45°3′55.2″N 83°10′55.68″W

General characteristics
- Class & type: Lake freighter
- Tonnage: 757 GRT; 591 NRT
- Length: 179 feet 1 inch (54.6 m)
- Beam: 32 feet 7 inches (9.9 m)
- Depth: 12 feet 2 inches (3.7 m)
- Installed power: Engine: 1 × single cylinder high pressure non–condensing steam engine; Boilers: 2 × 90 pounds per square inch (620 kPa) tubular marine boilers
- Propulsion: 1 × propeller

SS D. M. Wilson was a wooden–hulled American lake freighter built in 1873, in St. Clair, Michigan. She operated on the Great Lakes for 21 years, before springing a leak and sinking on Lake Huron, 2 miles (3.2 km) off Thunder Bay Island, on 27 October 1894, while laden with coal. Her wreck, although heavily salvaged, rests mostly intact in 40 feet (12.2 m) of water.

== History ==
D. M. Wilson (US official number 6772) was a wooden lake freighter, built shipwright Simon Langell in St. Clair, Michigan, in 1873. Her hull was 179 feet 1 inch (54.6 m) in length, 32 feet 7 inches (9.9 m) in beam, and 12 feet 2 inches (3.7 m). She had a gross register tonnage of 757, and a net register tonnage of 591. D. M. Wilson's propulsion system consisted of a single cylinder high pressure non–condensing steam engine with a 27-inch (0.7 m) bore, and a 30-inch (0.8 m) stroke built by the Globe Iron Works Company in Cleveland, Ohio, and two 90 pounds per square inch (620 kPa) tubular marine boilers.

Launched in May 1873, she was built for Thomas Wilson's Wilson line for service in the iron ore, coal and grain trades.

She was sold twice, to Charles H. Laine to serve as part of the Chicago & Ogdensburg Transit Company fleet in 1883, and to John A. Miller in 1890.

== Final voyage ==
On 27 October 1894, D. M. Wilson was headed from Cleveland, for Milwaukee, Wisconsin, with a cargo of coal, with the barge Manitowoc in tow. Off Sturgeon Point and about 25 miles (40.2 km) off Thunder Bay Island Light, she developed a serious leak. The steamers Hudson and Samuel Mitchell took her in tow, with the intention of taking her to Middle Island. However, while situated 2 miles (3.2 km) north–northeast of Thunder Bay Island, D. M. Wilson foundered. Her crew was rescued by the freighter Sylvanus J. Macy.

D. M. Wilson's wreck was damaged in a storm on 10 November.

== Wreck ==
The wreck of D. W. Wilson rests in 40 feet (12.2 m) of water. It was salvaged substantially after her loss, with most of her machinery being removed. While her cabins and most of her decks are gone and her stern is broken, most of her hull remains intact. An anchor and windlass remain at the site.
