= Albany (steamboat) =

Shipwreck of a side-wheel steamer in Lake Huron, Michigan, United States

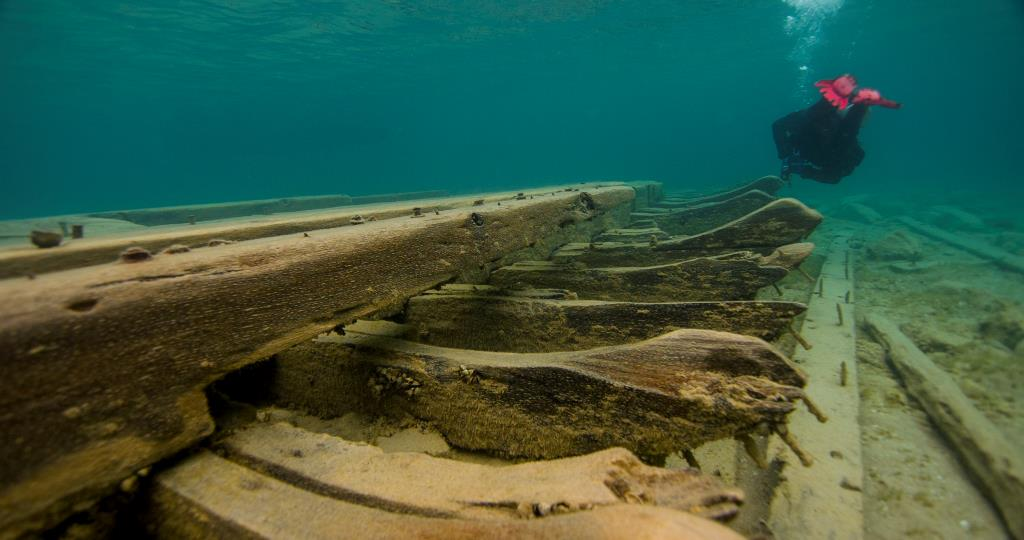
- A snorkeler examines the sunken timbers of the Albany

History

United States
- Name: Albany
- Operator: McKnight of Detroit
- Builder: C.L. Gager
- Launched: 1846
- Completed: 1846
- Acquired: 1846
- In service: 1846
- Out of service: 1853
- Fate: Ran aground and wrecked near Presque Isle in a storm, November 26, 1853

General characteristics
- Type: Wooden sidewheel steamer
- Tonnage: 669 GRT
- Length: 202 ft (62 m)
- Beam: 29 ft (8.8 m)
- Draught: 11.7 ft (3.6 m)
- Propulsion: Steam, side paddle wheels
- Capacity: Approximately 200 passengers and provisions
- Notes: Operated between major Great Lakes ports such as Buffalo, Cleveland, Detroit, and Chicago

Albany was a large wooden side‑wheel steamer built in 1846 by C.L. Gager in Detroit, Michigan. She was primarily owned by McKnight of Detroit, and served as a fast and reliable passenger and freight vessel on the Great Lakes, particularly for westward-bound settlers.

== Description ==
At the time of her loss, Albany measured 202 ft in length, with a beam of 29 ft and a draft of approximately 11.7 ft. Her gross tonnage was 669.36 tons. Propelled by twin side paddle wheels, the steamer was designed to carry passengers and provisions across the Great Lakes during the mid‑19th century.

== History and wreck ==
By the 1840s, steamers like Albany became essential in transporting settlers and goods across the growing Great Lakes region. She served ports such as Buffalo, Cleveland, Detroit, Milwaukee, and Chicago, becoming a mainstay of mid-century lake commerce.

On November 26, 1853, Albany, under the command of Capt. Jones, was driven ashore by a violent gale near Presque Isle, Michigan, approximately thirty miles from Thunder Bay. The steamer struck a reef just before midnight and then drifted closer to shore where she quickly filled and sank. Despite the harrowing storm, all passengers and crew, nearly 200 individuals, were safely rescued by local boats the following day.

Efforts to salvage Albany began shortly after the wreck, with steam and hand pumps deployed to raise the hull. However, a later gale caused irreparable damage, making it impossible to refloat her. Her furniture and much of the machinery were stripped and taken ashore.

The total estimated value of the vessel was $30,000, with cargo valued at $2,500. Notably, the vessel was uninsured at the time of the wreck, having expired just days earlier.

== The wreck ==
Today, remnants of Albany lie in shallow water, about 5 to 8 feet deep, in Albany Bay, Lake Huron. The primary wreckage is a 100–106 ft section of the vessel's lower hull, including the central bilge keelson, rider keelsons, and floor framing.

Small scattered sections of wreckage have been reported nearby, and a seasonal mooring buoy marks the main site for paddlers, snorkelers, and divers. Despite heavy salvage and natural degradation over time, portions of machinery, including boilers, were recovered and brought ashore shortly after the wreck.

GPS coordinates for the primary wreck site are approximately N 45° 19.396′ W 83° 27.508′.

== See also ==
- List of shipwrecks in the Thunder Bay National Marine Sanctuary
