= Northwestern (schooner) =

Shipwreck in Lake Huron, Michigan, United States

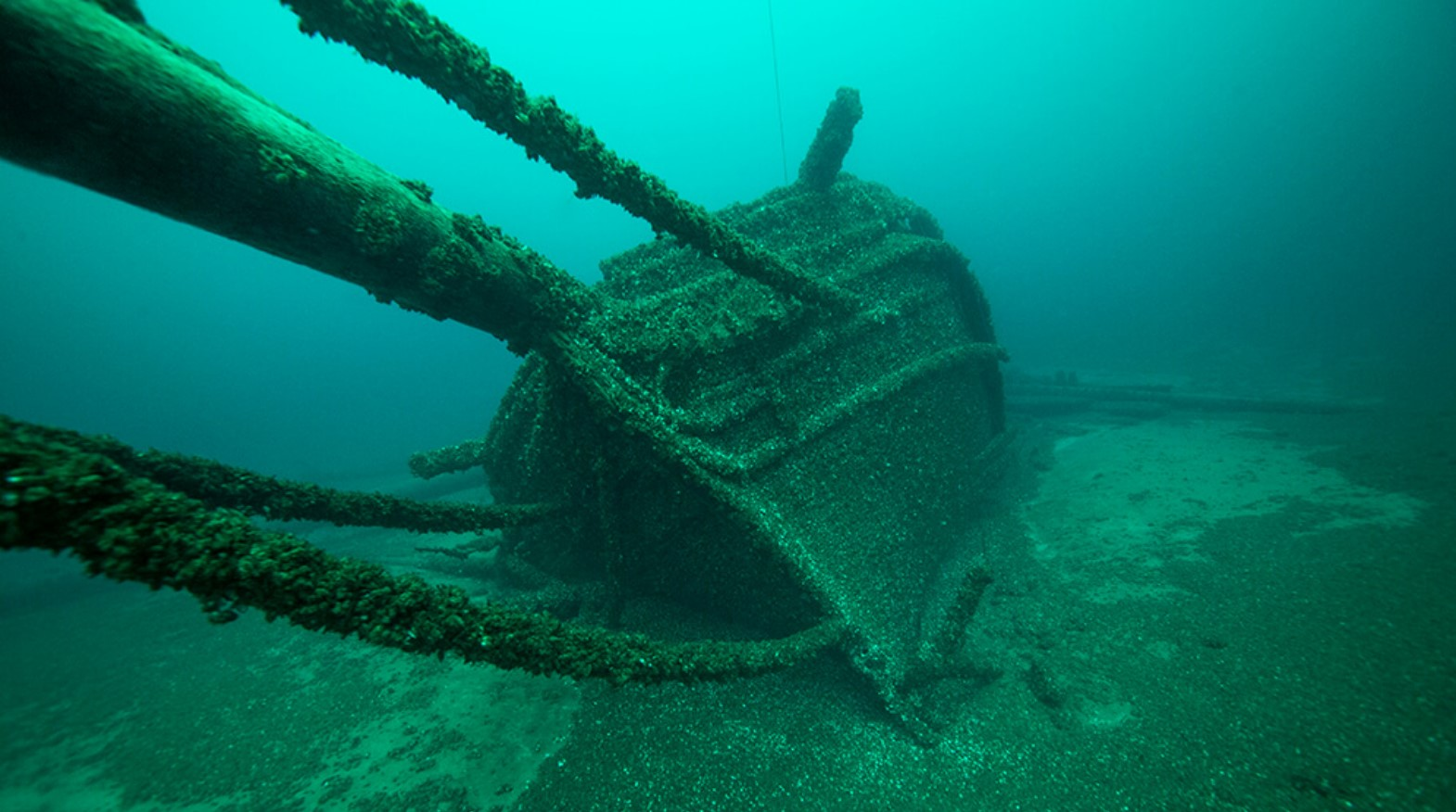
- The wreck of Northwestern

History

United States
- Name: Northwestern
- Operator: Robert Green et al.
- Builder: Andrew Miller
- Launched: 1847
- Completed: 1847
- Acquired: 1847
- In service: 1847
- Out of service: 1850
- Fate: Sank in Lake Huron after collision with Monticello, September 30, 1850

General characteristics
- Type: Two-masted wooden schooner
- Tonnage: 217.5 GRT
- Length: 115 ft (35 m)
- Propulsion: Sail
- Crew: 8

Northwestern was a two-masted wooden schooner launched in 1847 at Oswego, New York by shipbuilder Andrew Miller. Built for cargo service on the Great Lakes, she measured 115 feet (35 m) in length and had a gross register tonnage of approximately 217.5. The vessel was registered at Oswego and primarily operated by Robert Green and associates as of 1850.

== History ==
Originally enrolled in Oswego, New York, in 1847, Northwestern was a typical lake schooner of her time, built for the heavy cargo trade between eastern and midwestern ports. By 1850, she was under ownership of Robert Green and others, and regularly carried bulk goods across Lake Huron and Lake Michigan. Her final voyage was intended to transport 1,745 barrels and 1,200 sacks of salt from Oswego to Chicago.

== Sinking ==
On the night of September 30, 1850, Northwestern was sailing north of Presque Isle, Michigan, when her lookout spotted an oncoming steamship. As traffic along Lake Huron was common, the schooner adjusted course to avoid a collision. However, aboard the steamer Monticello, officers mistook Northwestern's masthead light for that of the Old Presque Isle Lighthouse and altered their course — directly into the schooner's path. The much larger steamship rammed into Northwestern, causing her to sink rapidly. All eight crew members escaped into boats and were rescued.

== The wreck ==
The wreck of Northwestern was located in 2004 by sport divers and rests in an upright position at a depth of 135 feet (41 m) at coordinates 45°26.940′N 83°41.671′W. Though small, the shipwreck is remarkably intact from bow to stern. The masts have toppled to the starboard side, and the hull leans slightly. The cold, fresh waters of Lake Huron have preserved the wooden structure, making it a popular site for recreational divers and maritime archaeologists.

== See also ==
- List of shipwrecks in the Thunder Bay National Marine Sanctuary
