= SS Messenger (1866) =

Shipwreck in Lake Huron, Michigan, United States

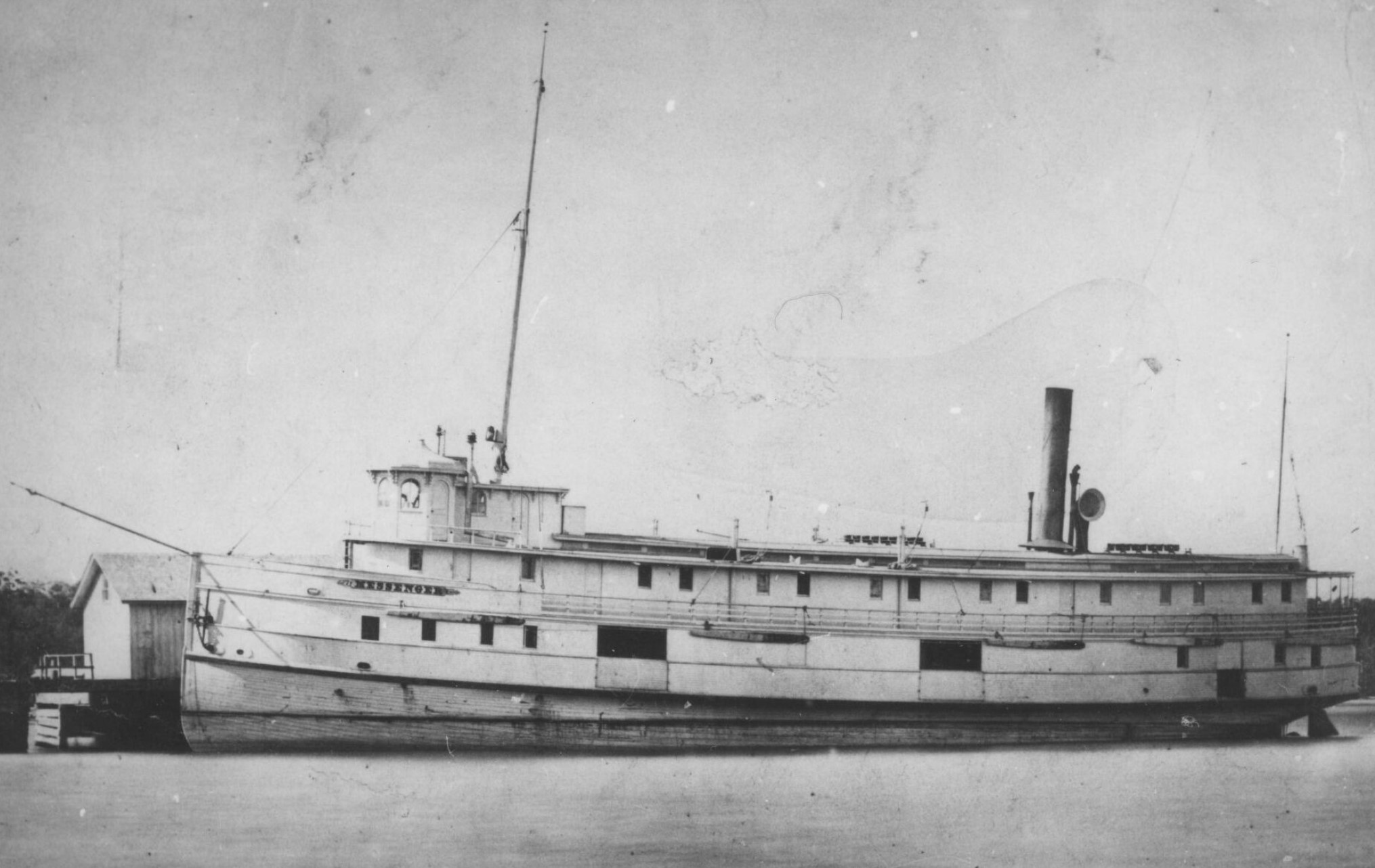

History

United States
- Name: Messenger
- Operator: Various (E.M. Peck, John Stevenson, others)
- Builder: E.M. Peck
- Launched: 1866
- Completed: 1866
- Acquired: 1866
- In service: 1866
- Out of service: 1890
- Identification: Official Number: 16654
- Fate: Burned and sank off Rogers City, Michigan, November 11, 1890

General characteristics
- Type: Wooden steam barge
- Tonnage: 288.58 GRT
- Length: 136.2 ft (41.5 m)
- Beam: 29.2 ft (8.9 m)
- Draught: 9.4 ft (2.9 m)
- Propulsion: Horizontal crosshead steam engine
- Capacity: Cedar logs (final voyage)
- Notes: Rebuilt from a propeller steamer in 1888

Messenger was a wooden steam barge originally launched as a propeller-driven steamer in 1866 by E.M. Peck at Cleveland, Ohio. After over two decades of service across the Great Lakes, she caught fire while docked at Rogers City, Michigan, and sank offshore on November 11, 1890. The wreck lies upright in 194 feet (59 m) of water and remains a preserved dive site within Lake Huron.

== Description ==
Messenger was built in 1866 with a wooden hull, measuring 142 feet (43 m) in original length, and later rebuilt in 1888 to a new length of 136.2 feet (41.5 m), with a beam of 29.2 feet (8.9 m) and a depth of 9.4 feet (2.9 m). After the rebuild, her gross tonnage was 288.58 tons. She was powered by a horizontal crosshead steam engine manufactured by Cuyahoga Steam Boiler Works in Cleveland, Ohio. The vessel featured one deck and one mast following her conversion to a steam barge.

== History ==
Messenger operated throughout the Great Lakes for over two decades, changing ownership several times. She served routes for owners such as Nathaniel Engelmann of Milwaukee, the Graham & Morton Transportation Co., and John Stevenson of Detroit. During her career, she suffered multiple incidents, including collisions, groundings, and ice entrapment, but remained in service until her final year. In 1888, she was significantly rebuilt and remeasured as a steam barge, commonly used to haul timber cargo such as cedar logs.

== Sinking ==
On November 11, 1890, while docked at Rogers City, Michigan, Messenger caught fire under dramatic circumstances. As the crew finished dinner, flames erupted from the smokestack and rapidly engulfed the vessel, fueled by the large cargo of cedar in her hold. Fearing the spread of the fire to nearby docks and lumber, the crew cut her lines and allowed the vessel to drift into Lake Huron. She burned to the waterline before sinking about four miles offshore.

== The wreck ==
Messenger now lies upright in 194 feet (59 m) of water at coordinates 45°24.613′N 83°45.983′W. The lower hull remains largely intact, while the upper structures, having burned in the fire, are no longer present. Cold freshwater has preserved key components such as the steam engine, boilers, rudder, and anchors. Divers visiting the wreck can observe significant fire damage as well as machinery and features that reflect her original construction.

== See also ==
- List of shipwrecks in the Thunder Bay National Marine Sanctuary
