= SS W. C. Franz =

Steel–hulled lake freighter (1901–1934)

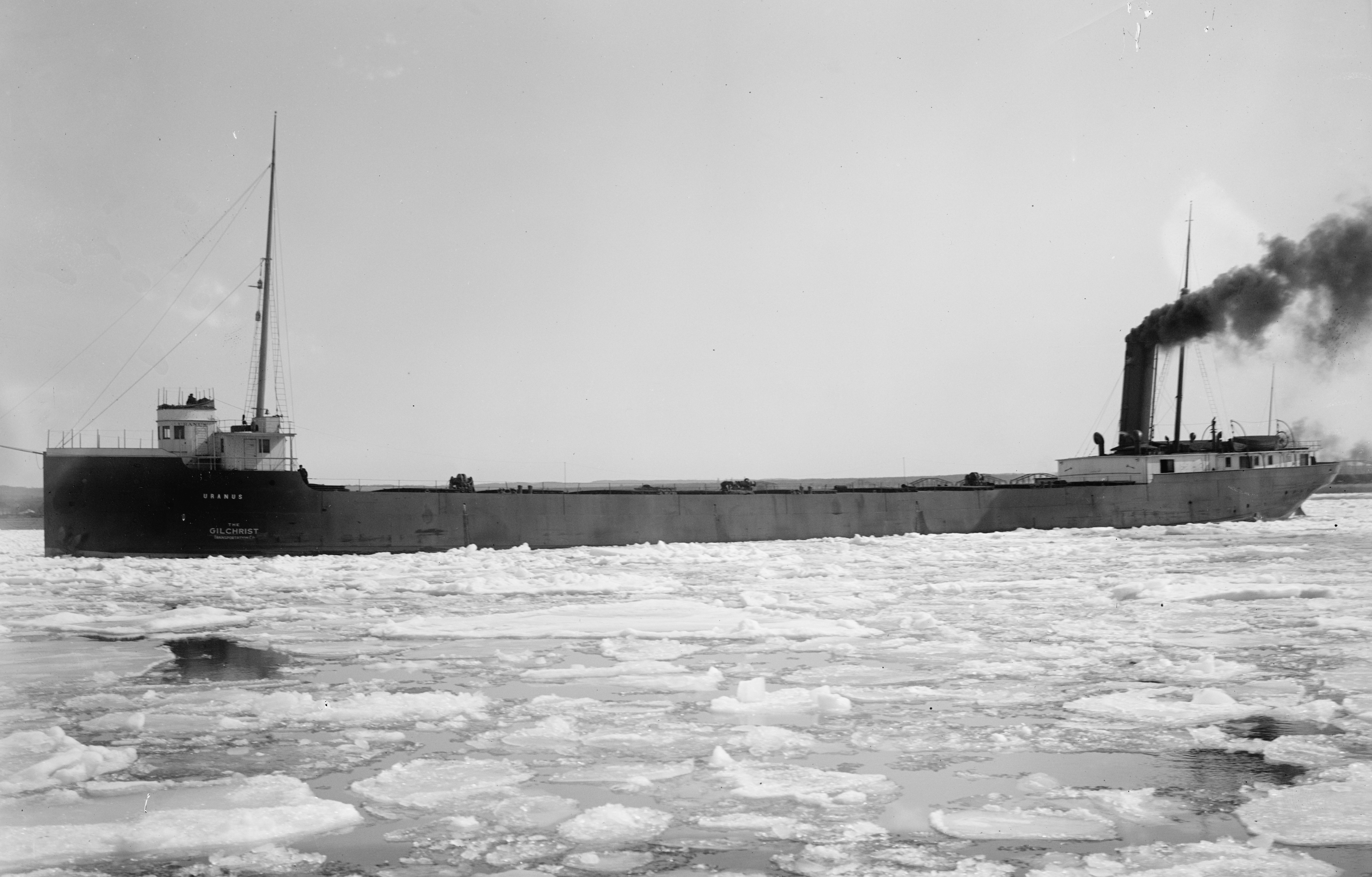

History

United States
- Name: Uranus
- Namesake: Uranus
- Operator: Gilchrist Transportation Company
- Port of registry: Fairport, Ohio
- Builder: Detroit Shipbuilding Company, Wyandotte, Michigan
- Yard number: 140
- Launched: 20 April 1901
- Identification: US official number 25339

Canada
- Name: W. C. Franz
- Namesake: William Charles Franz
- Operator: Algoma Central Steamship Company
- Port of registry: Sault Ste. Marie, Ontario
- Acquired: 1913
- Out of service: 21 November 1934
- Identification: Canadian official number 130775
- Fate: Sank in a collision on Lake Huron; 44°38′52.5″N 82°54′23.52″W

General characteristics
- Class & type: Lake freighter
- Tonnage: 3,748 GRT; 2,943 NRT
- Length: 346 feet (105.5 m)
- Beam: 48 feet (14.6 m)
- Depth: 28 feet (8.5 m)
- Installed power: Engine: 1 × 1,480 ihp (1,100 kW) 85 RPM quadruple expansion steam engine; Boilers: 2 × 170 pounds per square inch (1,200 kPa) Scotch marine boilers
- Propulsion: 1 × propeller

SS W. C. Franz was an American–built lake freighter built in 1901, in Wyandotte, Michigan. She was built under the name Uranus by the Detroit Shipbuilding Company for entrepreneur Joseph C. Gilchrist's Gilchrist Transportation Company. She remained with the company until 1913, when she was sold to the Algoma Central Steamship Company in 1913, and was renamed W. C. Franz.

While heading for Fort William, Ontario, on 21 November 1934 to load grain, she encountered thick fog on Lake Huron. At roughly 03:25, while approximately 30 miles (48.3 km) southwest of Thunder Bay Island, W. C. Franz was struck by the package freighter Edward E. Loomis, and gradually began to fill with water, sinking almost two hours after the collision. Four crewmen drowned.

Her wreck rests mostly intact in 230 feet (70.1 m) of water.

== History ==
=== Design and construction ===
Uranus (US official number 25339) was built by the Detroit Shipbuilding Company in Wyandotte, Michigan, as yard number 140. She was one of six identical freighters commissioned by Joseph C. Gilchrist, all of them were named after planets in the Solar System. Uranus, the last of the planet class to be completed, was launched on 20 April 1901.

She was built on the channel system, a longitudinal frame style introduced on the Great Lakes in the mid–1890s. It constituted several rows flanged steel plates running the entire length of a vessel's bottom, deriving its name from the "channels" between the frames. This method provided vessels with additional strength, as well as preventing damage sustained in groundings from spreading to other areas of the hull, and increasing cargo capacity. In spite of rapid advances in shipbuilding technology, the hold of Uranus remained reminiscent of those found on wooden lake freighters. Between 1882 and 1904, the cargo holds of all iron and steel freighters contained stanchions and steel angles which were the equivalent of the knees used on earlier wooden freighters. The stanchions within her hull were located 24 feet (7.3 m) apart, at the spaces between Uranus' 10 hatches, which were 8 feet (2.4 m) in depth. (Note: It would not be until 1904 that the traditional construction methods were dispensed with in favour of steel arches and sloped side "hopper" tanks, in the freighter Augustus B. Wolvin.) Her hull contained three watertight bulkheads. Her cargo hold was divided into three separate compartments, the first of which was 1,600 long tons (1,626 t) in capacity, the second was 2,200 long tons (2,235 t), while the third was 1,700 long tons (1,727 t). Her overall capacity was listed as 5,500 long tons (5,588 t).

The hull of Uranus was 346 feet (105.5 m) in length, as well as 48 feet (14.6 m) in beam. The moulded depth, roughly speaking, the vertical height of Uranus' hull, was 28 feet (8.5 m). The measurements of her register tonnage were calculated as 5,531 gross register tons and 3,991 net register tons, respectively.

She was powered by a 1,480 ihp (1,100 kW) 85 rpm triple-expansion steam engine; the cylinders of the engine were 22 inches (55.9 cm), 35 inches (88.9 cm), and 58 inches (147.3 cm) in diameter, and had a stroke of 42 inches (106.7 cm). Steam was provided by two water-tube boilers 13 feet 2 inches (4.0 m) in diameter, 11 feet 6 inches (3.5 m) in length, with a working pressure of 170-pound-per-square-inch (1,200 kPa). The boilers were each fitted with four furnaces, accounting for a combined grate surface of 88 square feet (8.2 m^{2}), and a total heating surface of 4,292 square feet (398.7 m^{2}). The engine and boilers were built by the Detroit Shipbuilding Company in Wyandotte.

=== Final voyage and wreck ===
The wreck of W. C. Franz rests mostly intact in 230 feet (70.1 m) of water, with the exception of the damage suffered in the collision.

== Sources ==
- "Channel System of Ship Construction". The Marine Review. 11 (18). Cleveland, Ohio: The Marine Review: 6. 1895 – via maritimehistoryofthegreatlakes.ca.
- "From Lake and Coast Shipbuilders". The Marine Review. 12 (11). Cleveland, Ohio: The Marine Review: 20–22. 1895 – via maritimehistoryofthegreatlakes.ca.
- Green, Fred W. (1912). "Mitchell & Co.'s Marine Directory of the Great Lakes – 1912". Cleveland, Ohio: Bureau Veritas – via maritimehistoryofthegreatlakes.ca.
- Herriman, H. N. (1912). "Great Lakes Register – For the Construction and Classification of Steel and Wooden Vessels – 1912". Chicago, Illinois: Lakeside Press – via maritimehistoryofthegreatlakes.ca.
- "Ship of the Month No. 137: W. C. Franz". Toronto, Ontario: Toronto Marine Historical Society. 1985 – via maritimehistoryofthegreatlakes.ca.
- Thompson, Mark L. (1994). Queen of the Lakes. Detroit, Michigan: Wayne State University Press. ISBN 0-8143-2393-6.
- "Uranus". Bowling Green, Ohio: Bowling Green State University. Archived from the original on 16 November 2019.
- "W. C. Franz". Silver Spring, Maryland: National Oceanic and Atmospheric Administration.
