= SS New Orleans =

Shipwreck in Lake Huron, Michigan, United States

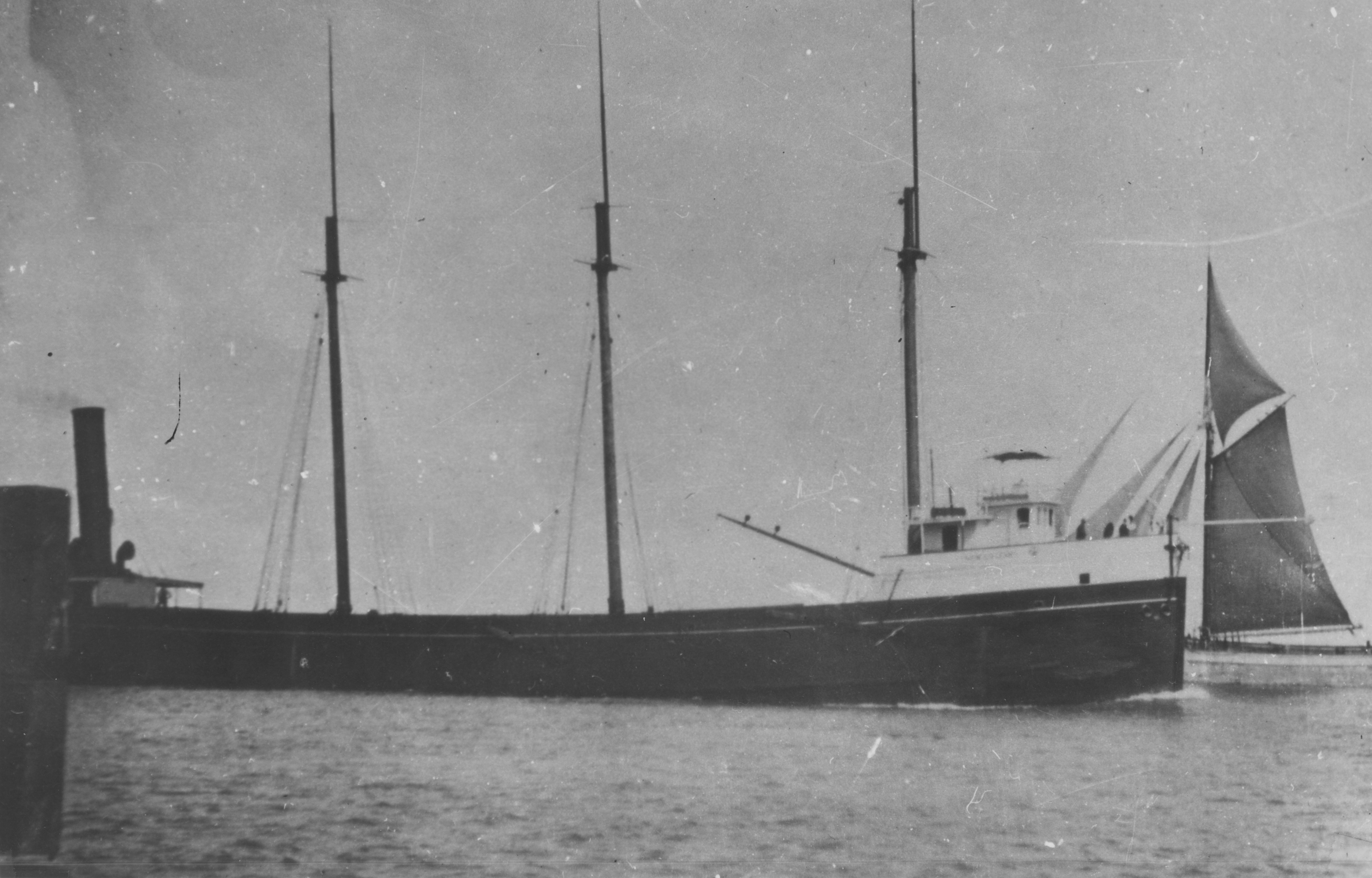

History

United States
- Name: New Orleans
- Operator: Hall & Root
- Builder: Morley & Hill
- Launched: 1885
- Completed: 1885
- In service: 1885
- Out of service: 1906
- Identification: Official Number: US130333
- Fate: Wrecked in Lake Huron June 30, 1906

General characteristics
- Type: Wooden bulk freighter
- Tonnage: 1,457 GRT
- Length: 240 ft (73 m)
- Beam: 38 ft (12 m)
- Draft: 13.6 ft (4.1 m)
- Depth: 21 ft (6.4 m)
- Decks: 2
- Installed power: 938 ihp (699 kW)
- Propulsion: Coal-fired boiler, compound engine (fore and aft)

SS New Orleans was a wooden Great Lakes bulk freighter built in 1885. She sank in Lake Huron following a collision with another steamer on June 30, 1906. She is a popular site for divers due to her intact machinery and accessible depth.

== Description ==
New Orleans measured 240 feet (73 m) in overall length, had a beam of 38 feet (12 m), and a depth of 21 feet (6.4 m). Her registered dimensions were 231.8 ft (70.7 m) long, 38.0 ft (11.6 m) in beam, and 13.6 ft (4.1 m) in draft. She had a gross register tonnage of 1,457 tons and was powered by a coal-fired boiler and a fore-and-aft compound steam engine rated at 938 indicated horsepower (699 kW). She was enrolled at Port Huron, Michigan, on May 8, 1885.

== History ==
New Orleans was constructed by Morley & Hill in Marine City, Michigan, and entered service in 1885. She was initially owned by W. B. Morley before being sold in 1888 to Frank B. Wallace, James J. Wallace, and Ed Cunningham of Detroit. In 1892, the vessel was transferred to the Wallace & Cunningham Transit Co. and later sold in 1900 to Capt. John B. Hall of Hall & Root of Buffalo, New York.

On October 15, 1903, the New Orleans stranded on a reef in Sturgeon Bay, Lake Michigan. Declared a constructive total loss and abandoned to insurers, she was later released, repaired, and returned to service under the same ownership.

== Sinking ==
On June 30, 1906, while heading upbound with a cargo of anthracite coal for Milwaukee, the New Orleans collided with the steamer William R. Linn in a dense fog between Middle Island and Thunder Bay Island. The impact caused the New Orleans to sink, though no lives were lost as her crew was rescued by William R. Linn. Her enrollment was surrendered on July 3, 1906.

== The wreck ==
The wreck lies in approximately 145 feet (44 m) of water at coordinates 45°10.053′N 83°13.043′W. The shipwreck site is relatively intact, and machinery like the winch can still be seen on the deck. Divers frequently visit the site, which features an orthomosaic survey of the wreck. Notable elements include the length of the hull (about 231 feet) and intact deck structures.

== See also ==
- List of shipwrecks in the Thunder Bay National Marine Sanctuary
