= Thunder Bay Island =

Island in Michigan, United States

Coordinates: 45°02′30″N 83°12′00″W

Thunder Bay Island is a 215-acre (87 ha) island in Lake Huron. The island is one of eight constituent islands of the Michigan Islands National Wildlife Refuge. The island is part of Alpena Township in Alpena County. It marks the entrance to Thunder Bay, the harbor of Alpena, Michigan and the location of the Thunder Bay National Marine Sanctuary.

The island is the home of a historic Thunder Bay Island Light, which in its current form dates to 1857, and adjacent quarters for the lightkeeper. The island also contains the sites of quarters for lifesaving service personnel and private-sector fishermen.

== History ==
=== Light station ===
The third operating U.S. lighthouse in Lake Huron was built here in 1831.

=== Lifesaving station ===
Thunder Bay Island was also the site of a station, opened in 1876, operated by the United States Life-Saving Service. It operated under that name until 1939, when the Life-Saving Service was consolidated into the Coast Guard.

=== Fishing station ===
In addition to the lightkeepers and lifesaving servicemen, who were employees of the U.S. federal government, private-sector families lived on Thunder Bay Island in the 1800s. During the 1830s and 1840s, a commodity market in barrelled fish arose on Lake Huron. The fresh-caught fish was quickly brought to a fishing station after being caught, and salted for preservation. A fishing station sprouted on Thunder Bay Island during this period, and an 1846 gazetteer counted 160 settlers on the island and 31 fishing boats that called the island their home port. Most of these fishing boats were small Mackinaw boats. The total catch is said to have been 12,000 barrels of fish per year. The Thunder Bay Island fishing station supported a small general store.

After a few decades, however, the yield of Lake Huron fish declined. The Thunder Bay Island fishing station became a ghost town.
