= Thunder Bay National Marine Sanctuary =

Aquatic protected area in Michigan, USA

Thunder Bay National Marine Sanctuary and Underwater Preserve
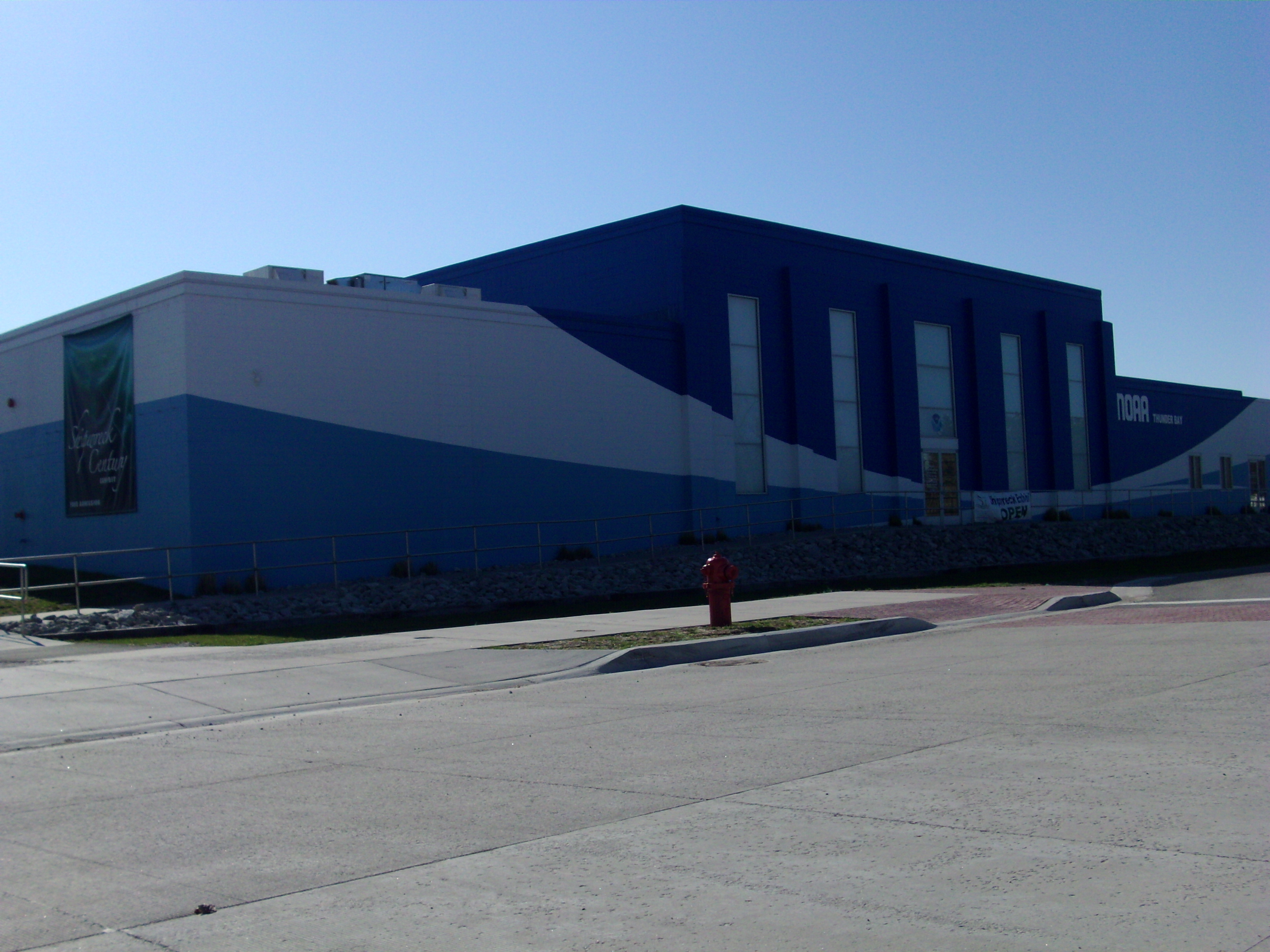
- Great Lakes Maritime Heritage Center

- Location within Michigan
- Location: Lake Huron (Alcona, Alpena, and Presque Isle counties, Michigan, United States)
- Nearest city: Alpena, Michigan
- Coordinates: 45.0034°N 83.253°W
- Area: 4,300 sq mi (11,000 km^{2})
- Established: June 22, 2000; 26 years ago
- Governing body: Michigan Department of Natural Resources, National Oceanic and Atmospheric Administration

Thunder Bay National Marine Sanctuary and Underwater Preserve is a United States National Marine Sanctuary on Lake Huron's Thunder Bay, within the northeastern region of the U.S. state of Michigan. It protects an estimated 116 historically significant shipwrecks ranging from nineteenth-century wooden side-wheeler paddle steamers to twentieth-century steel-hulled steamers. There are a great many wrecks in the sanctuary, and their preservation and protection is a concern for United States government policymakers. The landward boundary of the sanctuary extends from the western boundary of Presque Isle County to the southern boundary of Alcona County. The sanctuary extends east from the lakeshore to the international border. Alpena is the largest city in the area.

== History ==
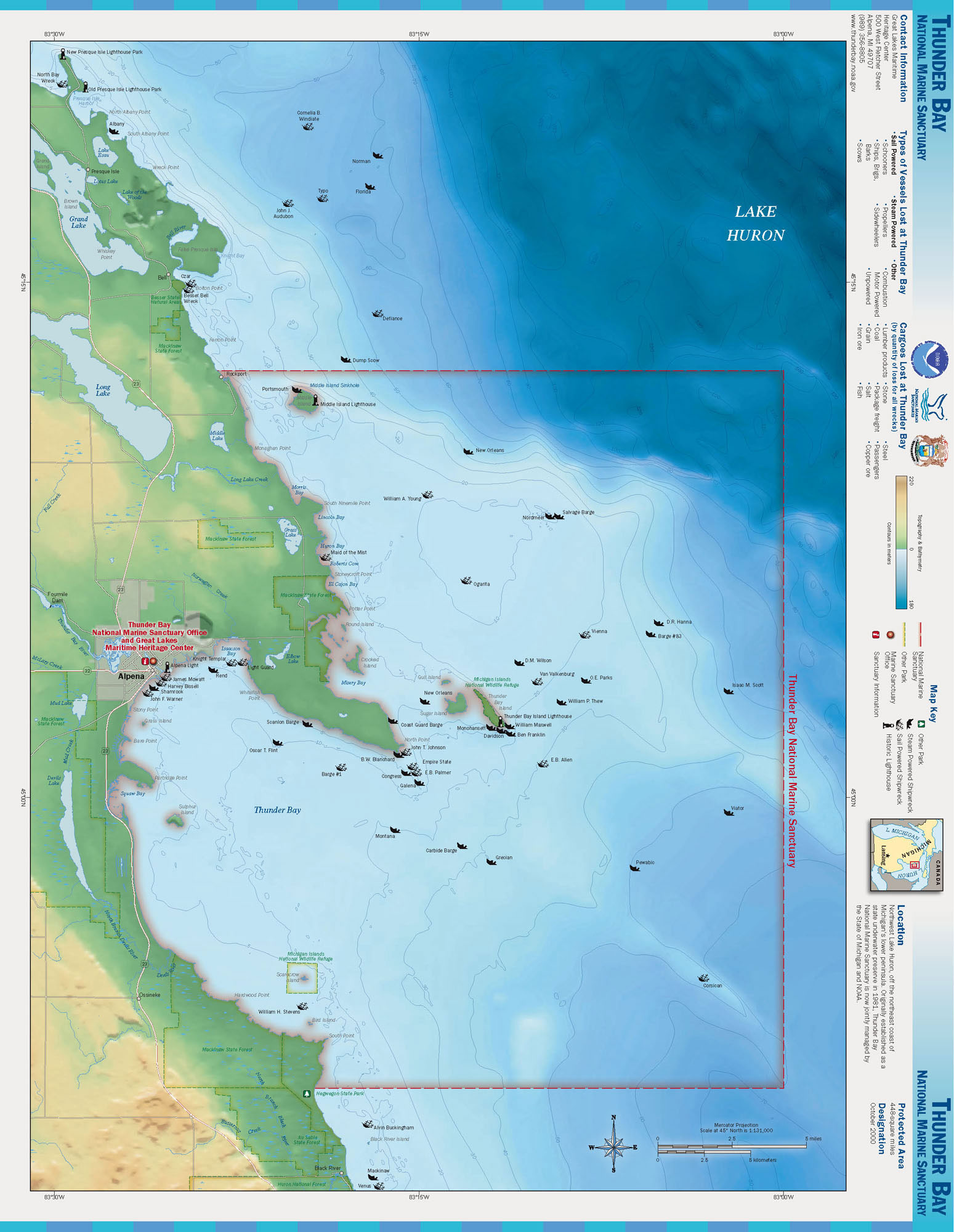
Map of Thunder Bay sanctuary showing original boundaries

The National Oceanic and Atmospheric Administration established Thunder Bay National Marine Sanctuary and Underwater Preserve on June 22, 2000. It became the thirteenth national marine sanctuary overall and first on the Great Lakes. Original boundaries followed that of Alpena County to 83 degrees west longitude totaling 448 square miles (338 sq nmi; 1,160 km^{2}). In 2014 it was expanded to 4,300 square miles (11,137 km^{2}). The marine sanctuary contains many shipwrecks, such as the hull of package freighter SS Pewabic.

== Great Lakes Maritime Heritage Center ==
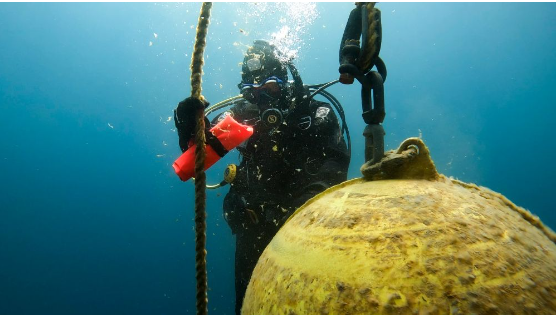
Resource Protection Specialist Cassandra Sadler prepares to deploy a lift bag to take the midwater buoy line to the surface during buoy operations in the sanctuary.

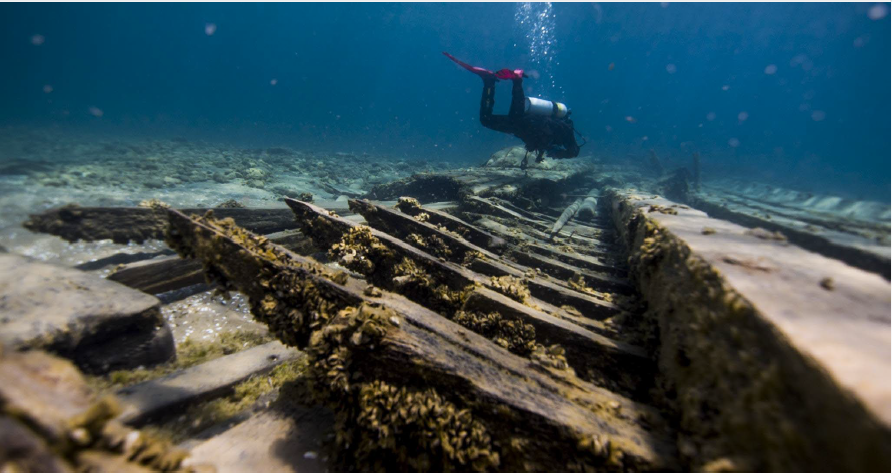
A diver over the wreck of SS New Orleans.

Tied to the sanctuary is the Great Lakes Maritime Heritage Center. The museum, located in Alpena on the Thunder Bay River, features exhibits about local shipwrecks and the Great Lakes, an auditorium, an archaeological conservation laboratory, and education areas.

== See also ==
- List of shipwrecks in the Thunder Bay National Marine Sanctuary
- Michigan Underwater Preserves
- Rockport State Park
