= List of shipwrecks in October 1854 =

The list of shipwrecks in October 1854 includes ships sunk, foundered, wrecked, grounded, or otherwise lost during October 1854.

== 1 October ==
List of shipwrecks: 1 October 1854
Ship	State	Description
Kingston-by-Sea	United Kingdom	The brig was in collision with Marian (United Kingdom) and foundered in the English Channel off Hastings, Sussex. Her crew were rescued by Agenoria (United Kingdom). Kingston-by-Sea was on a voyage from South Shields, County Durham to Shoreham-by-Sea, Sussex.
Yankee Blade	United States	The paddle steamer was driven onto the rocks at Point Arguello, California with the loss of 30-40 lives. More than 700 people were rescued the next day by Goliah (United States). Yankee Blade was on a voyage from San Francisco, California to Panama City, Republic of New Granada.

== 2 October ==
List of shipwrecks: 2 October 1854
Ship	State	Description
Emmet	United Kingdom	The ship capsized and sank in a squall off Kinghorn, Fife with the loss of all on board. She was on a voyage from Kirkcaldy, Fife to Glasgow, Renfrewshire.
Francisco Y. Carlotta	Mexico	The barque was destroyed by fire in the Pacific Ocean. Her crew survived. She was on a voyage from the Chincha Islands to Callao, Peru.
Iris	United Kingdom	The barque was abandoned in the Atlantic Ocean. Her crew were rescued by the brig Magnet (United Kingdom). Iris was on a voyage from Wallace, Nova Scotia, British North America to London.

== 3 October ==
List of shipwrecks: 3 October 1854
Ship	State	Description
Alice	(United Kingdom of Great Britain and Ireland) Isle of Man	The ship was wrecked on the Horse Bank, in the Irish Sea off the coast of Lancashire. Her five crew were rescued by the Lytham Lifeboat.
Endeavour	United Kingdom	The sloop was driven ashore and wrecked at Abergele, Denbighshire. Her crew were rescued by the Rhyl Lifeboat. She was on a voyage from the Clyde to Saltney, Cheshire.
Grange, and Persian	France; United Kingdom	The steamships collided in the Sea of Marmora and were both severely damaged. A passenger aboard Persian was killed; she was on a voyage from Constantinople, Ottoman Empire to Liverpool, Lancashire.
Isabella	United Kingdom	The smack ran aground on the Horse Bank, at the mouth of the River Ribble and was wrecked. Her crew were rescued by the Lytham Lifeboat. She was on a voyage from Bridgwater, Somerset to Preston, Lancashire.
Isabella	United Kingdom	The brig was in collision with a steamship and sank in the North Sea off the coast of Essex. Her crew were rescued by Matchless United Kingdom. Isabella was on a voyage from Blyth, Northumberland to London.
Laura Ann	United Kingdom	The ship sank in the Irish Sea 10 nautical miles (19 km) off the North West Lightship ( Trinity House). Her crew survived. She was on a voyage from Liverpool, Lancashire to Caernarfon.
Sarah Park	United States	The barque ran aground on the Kimmeridge Ledge, in the English Channel off the coast of Dorset, United Kingdom. She was on a voyage from Havre de Grâce, Seine-Inférieure to New York. She was refloated.

== 4 October ==
List of shipwrecks: 4 October 1854
Ship	State	Description
Haabet	Denmark	The galeas ran aground off Fanø and was wrecked. Her crew were rescued. She was on a voyage from Hull to Ribe.
Mary	Heligoland	The ship was driven ashore at Otterndorf, Kingdom of Hanover. She was on a voyage from Hamburg to Stockton-on-Tees, County Durham, United Kingdom. She was refloated on 13 October and taken in to Cuxhaven.

== 5 October ==
List of shipwrecks: 5 October 1854
Ship	State	Description
Aphrodite	Danzig	The barque was driven ashore and wrecked at "Tvensted", Denmark. She was on a voyage from Danzig to Hull, Yorkshire, United Kingdom.
Duke of Richmond	United Kingdom	The barque caught fire in the Atlantic Ocean (12°12′N 24°31′W) and was abandoned. All on board were rescued by Stag (United Kingdom), apart from five men who took to a lifeboat and were rescued by Elizabeth (United Kingdom). Duke of Richmond was on a voyage from London to Valparaíso, Chile and Callao, Peru.
Ebenezer	United Kingdom	The ship struck a sunken wreck and sank off South Shields, County Durham. Her crew were rescued by a pilot boat. She was on a voyage from Great Yarmouth, Norfolk to South Shields.
Gazelle	United Kingdom	The brig was driven ashore and wrecked 2 nautical miles (3.7 km) west of Alt Skagen, Denmark. Her crew were rescued. She was on a voyage from Härnösand, Sweden to Arundel, Sussex.
Gylfe	Sweden	The steamship was wrecked near "Orefrundsgripet". Her crew were rescued.
Hazard	Netherlands	The koff was run down and sunk in the River Thames at Woolwich, Kent, United Kingdom by a steamship. Her crew survived. She was on a voyage from Arkhangelsk, Russia to London, United Kingdom.
Helene	Denmark	The ship was driven ashore at Harboøre. Her crew were rescued. She was on a voyage from Hull to Aalborg.
John Rutledge	United States	The ship ran aground on the East Hoyle Bank, in Liverpool Bay. All on board were rescued. She was on a voyage from New York City to Liverpool, Lancashire, United Kingdom. John Rutledge was refloated the next day and towed into the River Mersey.
Patriot	United Kingdom	The ship was driven ashore at "Robertsknut", Denmark. Her crew were rescued. She was on a voyage from Newcastle upon Tyne, Northumberland to Copenhagen, Denmark.
Perseverance	United Kingdom	The ship was abandoned in the North Sea off Flamborough Head, Yorkshire. She was subsequently boarded by the crew of a fishing smack and taken in to Bridlington.
Polar Star	United Kingdom	The ship was destroyed by fire in the South Atlantic Ocean. All on board were rescued by Annameoka (Flag unknown). Polar Star was on a voyage from London to New Zealand.
Tvillingen Daniel and Wilco	Netherlands	The ship was driven ashore and wrecked at "Wesserkliff", Denmark. She was on a voyage from Danzig to Groningen.

== 6 October ==
List of shipwrecks: 6 October 1854
Ship	State	Description
Active	United Kingdom	The sloop was wrecked on the Dutchman Bank, in Liverpool Bay. Her crew were rescued. She was on a voyage from Liverpool, Lancashire to Dublin.
Dronningen	Norway	The ship was wrecked on the Corton Sand, in the North Sea off the coast of Suffolk, United Kingdom. Her crew were rescued by the Pakefield lifeboat. She was on a voyage from Drøbak to London, United Kingdom.

== 7 October ==
List of shipwrecks: 7 October 1854
Ship	State	Description
Constant	United Kingdom	The ship struck the Grandfours Rocks, off Jersey, Channel Islands. She was taken in to Saint Helier, Jersey in a severely leaky condition.
Emerald	United Kingdom	The smack was driven ashore and wrecked in Church Bay. Her crew were rescued. She was on a voyage from Cork to Aberystwyth, Cardiganshire.
Triton	United Kingdom	The Yorkshire Billyboy was driven ashore at Sunderland, County Durham. She was on a voyage from London to Sunderland.

== 8 October ==
List of shipwrecks: 8 October 1854
Ship	State	Description
Ellen and Mary	United Kingdom	The schooner collided with South Pictou ( (United Kingdom of Great Britain and Ireland) British North America) and sank in the Irish Sea. Her crew were rescued by South Pictou.
Hope	United Kingdom	The schooner was driven ashore and wrecked at Walmer, Kent. Her crew were rescued.
Hope	United Kingdom	The ship was driven ashore on Miscou Island, New Brunswick, British North America.
Lancaster	United Kingdom	The ship was abandoned in the Atlantic Ocean with the loss of a crew member. Survivors were rescued by Zilpah P. Brown (United States). Lancaster was on a voyage from Quebec City, Province of Canada, British North America to Bristol, Gloucestershire
Laurel	United Kingdom	The brig was driven ashore and wrecked at Santos, Brazil. Her crew were rescued. She was on a voyage from Rio de Janeiro, Brazil to London.
Magnet	United Kingdom	The ship sprang a leak in the North Sea and was abandoned. Her crew were rescued. She was on a voyage from Wisbech, Cambridgeshire to Antwerp, Belgium.
Pilote	France	The lugger was driven ashore at Seaton, County Durham, United Kingdom.
Ruby	United Kingdom	The brig was wrecked near Rio de Janeiro, Brazil. She was on a voyage from Rio de Janeiro to London.
Vine	United Kingdom	The ship was abandoned in the Atlantic Ocean 50 nautical miles (93 km) north west of the Isles of Scilly. Her crew survived.

== 9 October ==
List of shipwrecks: 9 October 1854
Ship	State	Description
Gazelle	United Kingdom	The ship was abandoned in the Atlantic Ocean. Her crew were rescued by Ophelia (United Kingdom). Gazelle was on a voyage from Quebec City, Province of Canada, British North America to London.
Mary	United Kingdom	The schooner was abandoned in the North Sea off the mouth of the Elbe. Her crew were rescued by the steamship Stoomvaar (Netherlands). Mary was on a voyage from Aberdeen to Hamburg.

== 10 October ==
List of shipwrecks: 10 October 1854
Ship	State	Description
Geertruida	Netherlands	The ship was sighted in the Vlie whilst on a voyage from Amsterdam, North Holland to Stettin. No further trace, presumed foundered with the loss of all hands.

== 11 October ==
List of shipwrecks: 11 October 1854
Ship	State	Description
Jane Clark	United Kingdom	The ship ran aground on Skagen, Denmark. She was on a voyage from London to Memel, Prussia. She was refloated on 19 October and towed in to Frederikshavn, Denmark.

== 12 October ==
List of shipwrecks: 12 October 1854
Ship	State	Description
Premier	France	The ship ran aground on the Holm Sand, in the North Sea off the coast of Suffolk, United Kingdom. She was on a voyage from Newcastle upon Tyne, Northumberland, United Kingdom to Nantes, Loire-Inférieure. She was refloated and takne in to Lowestoft, Suffolk in a leaky condition.
Sir Howard Douglas	United Kingdom	The ship ran aground on Læsø, Denmark and was scuttled. Her crew were rescued. She was on a voyage from Inverness to Stettin. She was refloated on 2 November and taken in to Frederikshavn, Denmark. Her captain was subsequently found not guilty of unlawfully scuttling the ship.
Walter R. Jones	United States	The full-rigged ship was wrecked on the Sunk Sand, in the Thames Estuary. Her crew were rescued by Elizabeth (United Kingdom). Walter R. Jones was on a voyage from Newcastle upon Tyne, Northumberland, United Kingdom to Philadelphia, Pennsylvania.

== 13 October ==
List of shipwrecks: 13 October 1854
Ship	State	Description
Ajax	United Kingdom	The paddle steamer ran aground west of The Mewstone, Devon. All on board, about 300 people, were rescued by HMS Calcutta, HMS Confiance (both Royal Navy) and the tug Queen (United Kingdom).
Ann Elizabeth	Kingdom of Sardinia	The galiot was driven ashore at Genoa. She was on a voyage from Belfast, County Antrim, United Kingdom to Genoa.
Elvira	United Kingdom	The brig was driven ashore at Groomsport, County Down. She was on a voyage from Glasgow, Renfrewshire to Dunkirk, Nord, France. She was refloated and taken in to Belfast for repairs.
London Packet	(United Kingdom of Great Britain and Ireland) Guernsey	The schooner was driven ashore in Gaspé Bay.

== 14 October ==
List of shipwrecks: 14 October 1854
Ship	State	Description
Maria	Netherlands	The ship foundered in the Mediterranean Sea off Mallorca, Spain. Her crew survived. She was on a voyage from Livorno, Grand Duchy of Tuscany to London, United Kingdom.
Triton	United Kingdom	The barque foundered in the Atlantic Ocean (44°54′N 45°05′W). Her crew were rescued by the clipper North Wind (United States). Triton was on a voyage from Glasgow, Renfrewshire to Boston, Massachusetts, United States.

== 15 October ==
List of shipwrecks: 15 October 1854
Ship	State	Description
Louisa	United Kingdom	The ship was driven ashore at Bideford, Devon. She was on a voyage from Quebec City, Province of Canada, British North America to Bristol, Gloucestershire.
St. Michael	France	The ship sprang a leak and was abandoned off Dunkirk, Nord. Her crew were rescued. SHe was on a voyage from Sunderland, County Durham, United Kingdom to Saint-Malo, Ille-et-Vilaine.

== 16 October ==
List of shipwrecks: 16 October 1854
Ship	State	Description
Cairson	United Kingdom	The sloop was driven ashore and wrecked at Scarborough, Yorkshire, Her crew were rescued by the Scarborough Lifeboat.
Félicité	France	The ship was driven ashore and wrecked at Dunkirk, Nord. She was on a voyage from Sunderland, County Durham, United Kingdom to Dunkirk.
Henrietta	Prussia	The ship was driven ashore at Dunkirk. She was on a voyage from Memel to Dunkirk.
Jane and Mary	United Kingdom	The ship was wrecked on "Roth Island", Norway. Her crew were rescued. She was on a voyage from Portmadoc, Caernarfonshire to Stettin.
Jeane Clementine	France	The schooner was driven ashore and wrecked at "Combartin". Her crew were rescued.
Mary	United Kingdom	The ship was driven ashore at Holyhead, Anglesey. Her crew were rescued. She was on a voyage from Quebec City, Province of Canada, British North America to Liverpool, Lancashire.
Nuestra Signora della Rosaria	Kingdom of Sardinia	The brig ran aground on the Goodwin Sands, Kent, United Kingdom. She was on a voyage from Newcastle upon Tyne, Northumberland, United Kingdom to Genoa. She was refloated.
Sané	French Navy	The paddle frigate ran aground at Toulon, Var. She was refloated the next day.
Strive	United Kingdom	The brig was abandoned in the Atlantic Ocean (44°00′N 30°40′W). Her crew were rescued by the full-rigged ship Arvum. Strive was on a voyage from Newport, Monmouthshire to New York, United States.
Tottenham	United Kingdom	The barque was wrecked at Woody Point, Newfoundland, British North America. All on board were rescued. She was on a voyage from Queenstown, County Cork to Quebec City.

== 17 October ==
List of shipwrecks: 17 October 1854
Ship	State	Description
Ambrosia	Sweden	The ship was driven ashore and wrecked between Cleethorpes and Tetney, Lincolnshire, United Kingdom. She was on a voyage from Gothenburg, Sweden to Hull, Yorkshire, United Kingdom.
Ann Guthrie	United Kingdom	The schooner was driven ashore and wrecked at Leith, Lothian. She was on a voyage from Rye, Sussex to Fisherrow, Lothian.
Atalanta	United Kingdom	The ship was driven ashore at Addlethorpe, Lincolnshire. She was on a voyage from Stettin to Shoreham-by-Sea, Sussex. She was subsequently destroyed by fire.
Boreas	United Kingdom	The brig was destroyed by fire off Great Yarmouth, Norfolk
Bosphorus	United Kingdom	The ship was driven ashore near Cleethorpes, Lincolnshire. She was on a voyage from London to South Shields, County Durham. She had been refloated by 24 October.
Britannia	United Kingdom	The ship was driven ashore 3 nautical miles (5.6 km) south of Arklow, County Wicklow.
Dandy	United Kingdom	The schooner was driven ashore and wrecked near Tetney. She was on a voyage from the River Thames to the River Tyne.
Eliza Jane	United Kingdom	The schooner departed from Liverpool, Lancashire for Newry, County Antrim. No further trace, presumed foundered with the loss of all hands.
Emporium	United Kingdom	The barque was driven ashore and wrecked in Robin Hoods Bay with the loss of four of her twelve crew. Survivors were rescued by the Coast Guard using rocket apparatus. She was on a voyage from Quebec City, Province of Canada, British North America to South Shields.
Essay	United Kingdom	The ship was driven ashore in north east England. She had been refloated by 24 October.
Freedom	United Kingdom	The ship was driven ashore at Sutton-on-Sea, Lincolnshire. She was on a voyage from Exeter, Devon to Middlesbrough, Yorkshire.
George Bentinck	United Kingdom	The ship was driven ashore on the coast of Lincolnshire. She was on a voyage from London to South Shields.
Gothen	Sweden	The barque was driven ashore and wrecked 3 nautical miles (5.6 km) east of Wells-next-the-Sea, Norfolk. Her crew were rescued. She was on a voyage from Lübeck to Hull.
Hamilton	United Kingdom	The ship was driven ashore in north east England. She had been refloated by 24 October.
Hazard	United Kingdom	The ship ran aground on the Cutler Sand, in the North Sea off the coast of Suffolk. She was on a voyage from Middlesbrough to London. She was refloated and taken in to Harwich, Essex.
Hebe	United Kingdom	The ship was driven ashore in north east England. She had been refloated by 24 October.
Hilding	Sweden	The ship was driven ashore at Grimsby, Lincolnshire. She was on a voyage from Gothenburg to Hull.
Iron Gem	United Kingdom	The barque was driven ashore and wrecked between Grainthorpe and Tetney. She was on a voyage from London to South Shields.
Labrador	French Navy	Crimean War: The paddle frigate was shelled and set afire at Sevastopol, Russia.
Mary and Elizabeth	United Kingdom	The ship was driven ashore at Grimsby. She was on a voyage from London to South Shields or Hartlepool, County Durham.
Niagara	United Kingdom	The barque was driven ashore and severely damaged at Hendon, County Durham. She was on a voyage from Quebec City, Province of Canada, British North America to Sunderland, County Durham.
Nicholas Wood	United Kingdom	The collier was driven ashore at Grainthorpe, Lincolnshire. She had been refloated by 24 October.
Plato	United Kingdom	The barque was driven ashore near West Hartlepool, County Durham.
Prince Albert	United Kingdom	The smack was wrecked at Amlwch, Anglesey. Her crew were rescued. She was on a voyage from Liverpool, Lancashire to Wicklow.
Queen of Trumps	United Kingdom	The sloop was driven ashore and wrecked at Goodwick, Pembrokeshire. Her crew were rescued.
Regent	United Kingdom	The brig was driven ashore at Tetney. All on board were rescued. She was on a voyage from Quebec City to Grimsby.
Roberto	Grand Duchy of Tuscany	The brig was driven ashore and severely damaged near Tetney. She was on a voyage from London to Newcastle upon Tyne, Northumberland.
Robust	United Kingdom	The smack was driven ashore west of Goodwick. Her three crew were rescued.
Sicilia	United Kingdom	The steamship sprang a leak and was abandoned in the Atlantic Ocean. Her crew were rescued by Francisco (Spain). Sicilia was on a voyage from Palermo, Sicily to Liverpool.
Tanager	Norway	The schooner foundered in the North Sea off the coast of Lincolnshire with the loss of at least five crew.
William	United Kingdom	The barque was driven ashore at Tetney. Her crew were rescued. She was on a voyage from Quebec City, Province of Canada, British North America to Hartlepool.

== 18 October ==
List of shipwrecks: 18 October 1854
Ship	State	Description
Albert	United Kingdom	The ship was driven ashore and wrecked on Ossebow Island, Georgia, United States. Her crew were rescued. She was on a voyage from Liverpool, Lancashire to Savannah, Georgia.
Albion	United Kingdom	The schooner struck the breakwater and sank at Holyhead, Anglesey with the loss of two of her three crew. She was on a voyage from Liverpool to Port Madoc, Caernarfonshire.
Alpha	United Kingdom	The ship was beached at Tarbert, Argyllshire, where she became a wreck. She was on a voyage from Dunbar, Lothian to Galway.
Annie	United Kingdom	The full-rigged ship ran aground at Liverpool.
Charlotte	Denmark	The yacht was driven ashore and wrecked between Grainthorpe and Tetney, Lincolnshire, United Kingdom with the loss of two of her crew. She was on a voyage from Thisted to Grimsby, Lincolnshire.
Corsair	United Kingdom	The full-rigged ship was driven ashore near Hartlepool, County Durham.
Courier	United Kingdom	The ship was driven ashore at Scalby, Yorkshire. She was later refloated and taken in to Scarborough.
Deptford	United Kingdom	The brig was driven ashore and wrecked near Hartlepool.
Diana (Диана)	Imperial Russian Navy	The steamship struck an underwater rock and sank near sv:Gråskär in the Gulf of Finland. Her crew were rescued. She was on a voyage from Sveaborg to Ruotsinsalmi.
Earl of Hopetown	United Kingdom	The ship was driven ashore near Hartlepool.
Eliza and Mary	United Kingdom	The Yorkshire Billyboy was wrecked on the Goswick Sand Ridge, in the North Sea off the coast of Northumberland with the loss of all on board.
Emma	France	The brig was driven ashore between Grainthorpe and Tetney.
Emma Elizabeth	United Kingdom	The ship was driven ashore near Genoa, Kingdom of Sardinia. She was refloated on 21 October.
Essay	United Kingdom	The ship was driven ashore on the coast of Lincolnshire. She was on a voyage from London to the River Wear.
Essex	United Kingdom	The brig was driven ashore near Hartlepool.
Gipsy	United Kingdom	The ship was driven ashore and wrecked at Huntcliff Foot, Yorkshire. All on board were rescued. She was on a voyage from Arbroath, Forfarshire to Sunderland.
Happy Return	United Kingdom	The fishing lugger foundered in the English Channel off the Dudgeon Sandbank with the loss of all eleven crew.
Helene	United Kingdom	The schooner was abandoned off Hartlepool. She was later towed in to Hartlepool.
Henry Wells	United Kingdom	The sloop was driven ashore near Hartlepool.
Iris	United Kingdom	The ship sank of St. Govan's Head, Pembrokeshire. She was on a voyage from Newport, Monmouthshire to Liverpool.
Jane	United Kingdom	The ship was driven ashore at Porthdinllaen, Caernarfonshire. She was on a voyage from Liverpool to Abersoch, Caernarfonshire.
Lady Dundas	United Kingdom	The ship was driven ashore on the coast of Lincolnshire. She was on a voyage from London to Hartlepool.
Let-me-alone	United Kingdom	The schooner was driven ashore between Grainthorpe and Tetney.
Maid of Whitehaven	United Kingdom	The ship was driven ashore 3 nautical miles (5.6 km) south of Ramsey, Isle of Man. Her crew were rescued. She was on a voyage from Whitehaven, Cumberland to Quebec City, Province of Canada, British North America.
Margaret	United Kingdom	The ship departed from Liverpool for Rotterdam, South Holland, Netherlands. No further trace, presumed foundered with the loss of all hands.
Mary	United Kingdom	The brig was driven ashore 3 nautical miles (5.6 km) south of Ramsey, Isle of Man. She was on a voyage from Quebec City to Harrington, Cumberland.
Montgomery	United Kingdom	The ship ran aground in the Hooghly River and was damaged. She was on a voyage from Calcutta, India to Demerara, British Guiana. She put back to Calcutta for repairs.
Prospect	United Kingdom	The brig was abandoned off Hartlepool. Her crew were rescued by the Hartlepool Lifeboat. She was on a voyage from Aberdeen to Hartlepool. Prospect subsequently came ashore.
Richard and Mary	United Kingdom	The smack was driven ashore and wrecked at Newport, Pembrokeshire. Her crew were rescued.
Robert	United Kingdom	The ship was driven ashore at Abercastle, Pembrokeshire.
Tanner	United Kingdom	The ship was driven ashore at Humberston, Lincolnshire. She was on a voyage from Rochester, Kent to Hartlepool. She was refloated on 27 October.
Trial	United Kingdom	The schooner was driven ashore between Grainthorpe and Tetney.
Vulcan	France	The brig was driven ashore and wrecked between Grainthorpe and Tetney.
William Thompson	United Kingdom	The brig was driven ashore between Grainthorpe and Tetney.

== 19 October ==
List of shipwrecks: 19 October 1854
Ship	State	Description
Alert	United Kingdom	The ship was wrecked at the mouth of the Savannah River. Her crew were rescued. She was on a voyage from Liverpool, Lancashire to Savannah, Georgia, United States.
Anne Longton	United Kingdom	The ship was damaged by fire at Liverpool.
Caroline Adolphine	Hamburg	The ship was wrecked near Rønne, Denmark. Her crew were rescued. She was on a voyage from Königsberg, Prussia to Montrose, Forfarshire, United Kingdom.
Cecilia	United Kingdom	The steamship sprang a leak and was abandoned in the Atlantic Ocean (49°54′N 8°31′W). Her crew were rescued. Presumed subsequently foundered.
Eliza Jane	United Kingdom	The ship was driven ashore at Tetney Haven, Lincolnshire. She was on a voyage from Richibucto, New Brunswick, British North America to Grimsby, Lincolnshire. She was refloated on 5 December and taken in to Grimsby.
Enterprise	United Kingdom	The brig was wrecked on the West Hoyle Bank, in Liverpool Bay. Her crew survived. She was on a voyage from Teignmouth, Devon to Liverpool.
Nene Valley	United Kingdom	The barque ran aground about 15 kilometres (9.3 mi) north west of Cape Northumberland on the south-east coast of South Australia.
Regent	United Kingdom	The ship was driven ashore at Tetney Haven. She was on a voyage from Quebec City, Province of Canada, British North America to Grimsby. She was refloated on 5 December and taken in to Grimsby.
William Watson	United Kingdom	The ship was driven ashore at Tetney Haven. She was on a voyage from Quebec City to Grimsby. She was refloated on 5 December and taken in to Grimsby.

== 20 October ==
List of shipwrecks: 20 October 1854
Ship	State	Description
Bertha	Stralsund	The ship ran aground on the Knashaken, south of Helsingborg, Sweden. She was on a voyage from Sunderland, County Durham, United Kingdom to Stralsund. She was refloated and taken in to Helsingør, Denmark for repairs.
Defiance	United States	During a voyage from Chicago, Illinois, to Detroit, Michigan, with a cargo of grain, the wooden schooner collided with the brig John J. Audubon in Lake Huron off the coast of Michigan and foundered. Her crew survived. Her wreck lies in 185 feet (56 m) of water at 45.2343°N 83.27845°W.
John J. Audubon	United States	John J. Audubon in 2018. Loaded with a cargo of railroad iron, the brig collided with the schooner Defiance in Lake Huron off the coast of Michigan and foundered. Her crew survived. Her wreck lies in 170 feet (52 m) of water at 45.28885°N 83.339183°W.
Tenterden	United Kingdom	The ship was driven ashore at Marshchapel, Lincolnshire. She was on a voyage from Amsterdam, North Holland, Netherlands to Sunderland. She was refloated and towed in to Grimsby, Lincolnshire.
Theodor	Kingdom of Hanover	The ship was driven ashore on Sylt, Duchy of Holstein. Her crew were rescued.

== 22 October ==
List of shipwrecks: 22 October 1854
Ship	State	Description
Bernardina	Denmark	The ship sank in the North Sea. Her crew were rescued by Ida (Flag unknown). Berndardina was on a voyage from Thisted to Hull, Yorkshire, United Kingdom.
Cambria	United Kingdom	The full-rigged ship was abandoned in the Atlantic Ocean. Her crew were rescued by Phantom (United States). Cambria was on a voyage from Liverpool, Lancaster to Charleston, South Carolina, United States. She was subsequently towed in to Saint Thomas, Virgin Islands by RMS Curlew (United Kingdom).
Eliza Ann	(United Kingdom of Great Britain and Ireland) Victoria	The clipper-built schooner parted her cables and foundered on rocks at Māhia Peninsula, New Zealand, in a gale.
Elizabeth	United Kingdom	The schooner was abandoned in Liverpool Bay. She was subsequently towed in to the River Mersey by the tug Constitution (United Kingdom).
Paramatta	United Kingdom	The brig was wrecked in the Maldive Islands. Her crew were rescued. She was on a voyage from London to Colombo, Ceylon.

== 23 October ==
List of shipwrecks: 23 October 1854
Ship	State	Description
James Chadwick	United Kingdom	The ship was driven ashore on Anholt, Denmark. She was on a voyage from London to Memel, Prussia. She was refloated and taken in to Helsingør, Denmark.
Jane	United Kingdom	The schooner foundered off Padstow, Cornwall.
Witham	United Kingdom	The brig was in collision with the brig Faith (United Kingdom) in the North Sea and was severely damaged. She was on a voyage from London to Seaham, County Durham. She was towed in to Great Yarmouth, Norfolk by two fishing boats.

== 24 October ==
List of shipwrecks: 24 October 1854
Ship	State	Description
Pacific	United Kingdom	The brig was run down and sunk in the North Sea off Tynemouth, Northumberland by the steamship Chanticleer (United Kingdom). Her crew were rescued. She was on a voyage from Shoreham-by-Sea, Sussex to Blyth, Northumberland.
Thomas and Ann	United Kingdom	The collier, a brig or schooner, was run into by Moro Castle (United Kingdom) off Dungeness, Kent and was abandoned by her crew, who were rescued by Moro Castle. She was on a voyage from Honfleur, Manche, France to Sunderland, County Durham. Thomas and Ann was discovered derelict off Dungeness on 28 October. She was towed in to Dover, Kent by the fishing smack Blue-eyed Maid (United Kingdom).
18 May	Hamburg	The galeas sprang a leak whilst on a voyage from Hamburg to Stockton-on-Tees, County Durham, United Kingdom. She put in to Cuxhaven in a sinking condition.

== 25 October ==
List of shipwrecks: 25 October 1854
Ship	State	Description
Forerunner	United Kingdom	The steamship was wrecked off Madeira Island with the loss of fourteen of the 62 people on board. Survivors were rescued by fishing boats. She was on a voyage from Sierra Leone to London.
Solid	United Kingdom	The ship foundered in the North Sea. Her crew were rescued by Pieter (Netherlands). Solid was on a voyage from Dram, Norway to London.
Viscount Hardinge	United Kingdom	The ship was wrecked on the Morup Reef, in the Baltic Sea. She was on a voyage from Hull, Yorkshire to Memel, Prussia.

== 26 October ==
List of shipwrecks: 26 October 1854
Ship	State	Description
Henrys	United Kingdom	The ship ran aground at Sunderland, County Durham. She was refloated and towed in to Sunderland.
Mary Anne	United Kingdom	The schooner collided with the brigantine Nugget (United Kingdom) and sank in the Irish Sea off Point Lynas, Anglesey. Her crew were rescued by Nugget. Mary Anne was on a voyage from Liverpool, Lancashire to Dublin.
Thomas	United Kingdom	Crimean War: The brig was driven ashore and wrecked on the coast of the Courland Governorate. Her crew were taken prisoner by Russian soldiers. They were released in late November. Thomas was on a voyage from Middlesbrough, Yorkshire to Memel, Prussia.

== 27 October ==
List of shipwrecks: 27 October 1854
Ship	State	Description
Bellerophon	United Kingdom	The ship was driven ashore at Memel, Prussia.
Dart	United Kingdom	The ship was run down and sunk in the North Sea off the coast of Norfolk by Tecumseh ( (United Kingdom of Great Britain and Ireland) British North America). Her crew were rescued by Tecumseh. Dart was on a voyage from Sunderland, County Durham to London.
Ellen	United Kingdom	The Mersey flat sank off the Hilbre Islands, Cheshire. Her crew survived.
Grace	United Kingdom	The ship was wrecked at the mouth of the River Avon. She was on a voyage from Liverpool, Lancashire to Dumfries.
Harvest	United Kingdom	The brig was driven ashore at Newhaven, Sussex. She was on a voyage from Sunderland to Newhaven. She was refloated and taken in to Newhaven.
Lamoriguière	France	Crimean War: The troopship was wrecked at the entrance to the Sea of Marmora. All on board were rescued by Gorgone (French Navy).
Melbourne	United Kingdom	The ship was driven ashore at Rock Ferry, Cheshire. She was on a voyage from Liverpool to Sydney, New South Wales.
Neustrie	France	The barque was driven ashore and wrecked at "Porto Plata".
Prosperous	United Kingdom	The Yorkshire billyboy struck the Megstone Rock, in the Farne Islands, Northumberland and was wrecked. Her crew survived. She was on a voyage from Dunbar, Lothian to Newcastle upon Tyne, Northumberland.
Queen Anne	United Kingdom	The smack foundered in the Irish Sea 10 nautical miles (19 km) south of Milford Haven, Pembrokeshire. Her crew were rescued by the schooner Anna Maria (United Kingdom).
Theburn	United Kingdom	The ship was driven ashore and wrecked on "Onny Island", County Galway.
Waterwitch	United Kingdom	The barque was driven ashore at Cape Hogan, Cape Breton Island, Nova Scotia, British North America. She was on a voyage from Prince Edward Island, British North America to Liverpool. She was refloated and put in to Arichat, Nova Scotia in a severely hogged and leaky condition.

== 28 October ==
List of shipwrecks: 28 October 1854
Ship	State	Description
Ant	United Kingdom	The schooner was driven ashore and damaged at Blyth, Northumberland.
Boyne	United Kingdom	The schooner was in collision with Miriam (United Kingdom) in the North Sea off the coast of County Durham and was abandoned by her crew, who were rescued by Miriam.
HMS Cossack	Royal Navy	The Cossack-class corvette ran aground on the Draystone, off Sheerness, Kent.
James	United Kingdom	The ship was driven ashore and wrecked near Wexford. Her crew were rescued.
Jupiter	United Kingdom	The barque was driven ashore and wrecked in Dundrum Bay. Her crew were rescued by the Coast Guard. She was on a voyage from Liverpool, Lancashire to Veracruz, Mexico.
Queen	United Kingdom	The brig was driven ashore near Carrickfergus, County Antrim. She was on a voyage from Maryport, Cumberland to Belfast, County Antrim.
Santurce	Spain	The brig caught fire at Málaga and was scuttled.
Sarah Anne	United Kingdom	The barque was wrecked at Sheepland Point, County Down with the loss of a crew member. She was on a voyage from Liverpool to Newport, Monmouthshire and Matanzas, Cuba.
Teia	Trieste	The brig was driven ashore at Lochgilphead, Argyllshire, United Kingdom. Her crew were rescued. She was on a voyage from Liverpool to Constantinople, Ottoman Empire. She was refloated on 3 November.
Thomas	United Kingdom	The ship was driven ashore and wrecked on the coast of the Courland Governorate. Her crew were rescued.
United Kingdom	United Kingdom	The ship was driven ashore at Carrickfergus. She was on a voyage from Quebec City, Province of Canada, British North America to Greenock, Renfrewshire.
William Poole	United Kingdom	The ship was wrecked at Holyhead, Anglesey with the loss of all hands.

== 29 October ==
List of shipwrecks: 29 October 1854
Ship	State	Description
Lord Nelson	United Kingdom	The sloop was discovered off Moelfre Island, Anglesey in a derelict condition. She was taken in to Beaumaris, Anglesey.
Sarah Ann	United Kingdom	The ship ran aground on the Newcombe Sand, in the North Sea off the coast of Suffolk. She was on a voyage from Hartlepool, County Durham to London. She was refloated and taken in to Lowestoft, Suffolk in a leaky condition.
William Penn	United Kingdom	The ship foundered off the Mull of Galloway, Argyllshire having been in collision with another vessel two days previously. She was on a voyage from Liverpool, Lancashire to Aden.

== 30 October ==
List of shipwrecks: 30 October 1854
Ship	State	Description
Pauline	France	The brigantine was wrecked in the Black Sea 20 leagues (60 nautical miles (110 km) north of "Cape Cagliakri" with the loss of three of her crew.
Thomas	United Kingdom	The brig was driven ashore and wrecked between Palanga, Russia and Libava, Courland Governorate. Her crew survived but were taken as prisoners of war.
Three Brothers	United Kingdom	The ship was driven ashore at Campbeltown, Argyllshire. She was on a voyage from Ardrossan, Ayrshire to Fleetwood, Lancashire.
Trent	United Kingdom	The steamship was driven ashore near Varna, Ottoman Empire. She was refloated.

== 31 October ==
List of shipwrecks: 31 October 1854
Ship	State	Description
Antoinette Andromache	France	The bomb was wrecked between "Caraburnu" and Midia, Ottoman Empire.
Augusta	United Kingdom	The brig was driven ashore on the Isle of Bute.
Ida Elizabeth	Netherlands	The ship was driven ashore at Belfast, County Antrim, United Kingdom. Her crew were rescued. She was on a voyage from Liverpool, Lancashire, United Kingdom to Batavia, Netherlands East Indies.
Marie Melanie	France	The ship was wrecked between "Caraburnu" and Midia.
Nouvelle Française	France	The brig was wrecked at Varna, Ottoman Empire. Her crew were rescued.
Nostra Signora della Misericordia	Kingdom of Sardinia	The brig was wrecked at Varna. Her crew were rescued.
San Francesco da Paola	Kingdom of Sardinia	The bomb was wrecked at Varna. Her crew were rescued.
Skylark	United Kingdom	The ship was driven ashore near Maryport, Cumberland. She was on a voyage from Liverpool, Lancashire to Dumfries.

== Unknown date ==
List of shipwrecks: Unknown date in October 1854
Ship	State	Description
Adriana Petronella	Netherlands	The full-rigged ship ran aground 4 nautical miles (7.4 km) west north west of Kangean Island, Netherlands East Indies. She was consequently beached on Lapude Island.
Albert	United Kingdom	The ship was wrecked on the west coast of Ossabaw Island, Georgia, United States. Her crew were rescued. She was on a voyage from Liverpool, Lancashire to Savannah, Georgia.
Bellesa	United Kingdom	The ship ran aground on the Prata Shoal, in the South China Sea before 11 October. She was refloated and put in to Hong Kong.
Beta	Bremen	The barque was abandoned in the Atlantic Ocean before 28 October. She was on a voyage from Baltimore, Maryland, United States to London, United Kingdom. She was discovered by Dr. Rogers (United States) and taken in to Hunts Hole, Massachusetts, where she arrived on 5 November.
Caldera	United States	The ship was driven ashore on the coast of China. She was on a voyage from Hong Kong to San Francisco, California
Cyane	United Kingdom	The ship ran aground on the Prata Shoal before 10 October. She was refloated and put in to Hong Kong.
Davenport	United Kingdom	The ship was abandoned in the Grand Banks of Newfoundland before 12 October. Her 21 crew were rescued by the brig Regent (United Kingdom). Davenport was on a voyage from Quebec City, Province of Canada, British North America to Liverpool, Lancashire.
Eliza	United Kingdom	The ship was in collision with Clara (United Kingdom) and sank off the coast of Norfolk with the loss of three lives.
Eliza Thornton	United States	The ship was wrecked on "Pert Brancka".
Ellis	United States	The schooner was abandoned in the Mediterranean Sea. Her crew were rescued by the full-rigged ship Milan (United States). Ellis was on a voyage from Mobile, Alabama to Marseille, Bouches-du-Rhône, France.
Express	United Kingdom	The ship was abandoned in the South Atlantic Ocean before 24 October. She was on a voyage from Cardiff, Glamorgan to Singapore, Straits Settlements. She was discovered on that date by Ann Bridson (United Kingdom and was set afire.
Four Seasons	United Kingdom	The ship was abandoned in the Atlantic Ocean before 25 October.
Hiram	United Kingdom	The ship was abandoned in the South China Sea before 9 October.
Holmes	United Kingdom	The ship foundered in the Irish Sea off St. Govan's Head, Pembrokeshire in late October with the loss of all hands. She was on a voyage from Alexandria, Egypt to Liverpool.
Isis	United Kingdom	The barque was abandoned in the Atlantic Ocean before 7 October.
Juno	United Kingdom	The ship was abandoned in the North Sea before 11 October.
Laromiguière	France	The transport ship was wrecked near Varna, Ottoman Empire. She was on a voyage from Balaklava, Russia to Constantinople, Ottoman Empire.
Manilla	United Kingdom	The ship was wrecked on the Florida Reef. Her crew were rescued by Tempest (United Kingdom). Manilla was on a voyage from British Honduras to London.
Marianne	United Kingdom	The ship was driven ashore on the coast of China. She was on a voyage from Whampoa to Amoy.
Morayshire	United Kingdom	The ship was abandoned in the Indian Ocean before 12 October. Her crew were rescued. She was on a voyage from Bombay, India to London.
Old Hickory	United States	The barque struck a sunken wreck off Tynemouth, Northumberland, United Kingdom and was damaged. She was on a voyage from South Shields, County Durham, United Kingdom to Calcutta, India. She put in to London for repairs.
Rob Roy	United Kingdom	The ship was wrecked in the Andaman Islands before 9 October. She was on a voyage from Calcutta to China.
Royal Southwark	United States	The ship was abandoned in the Atlantic Ocean before 10 October. .
Thomas Chadwick	United Kingdom	The barque was wrecked on the Prata Shoal before 11 October.
Thorburn	United Kingdom	The ship foundered in the Atlantic Ocean with the loss of a crew member. She was on a voyage from Liverpool to Quebec City, Province of Canada, British North America.
