= HMS Pylades (1854) =

British Pylades-class corvette

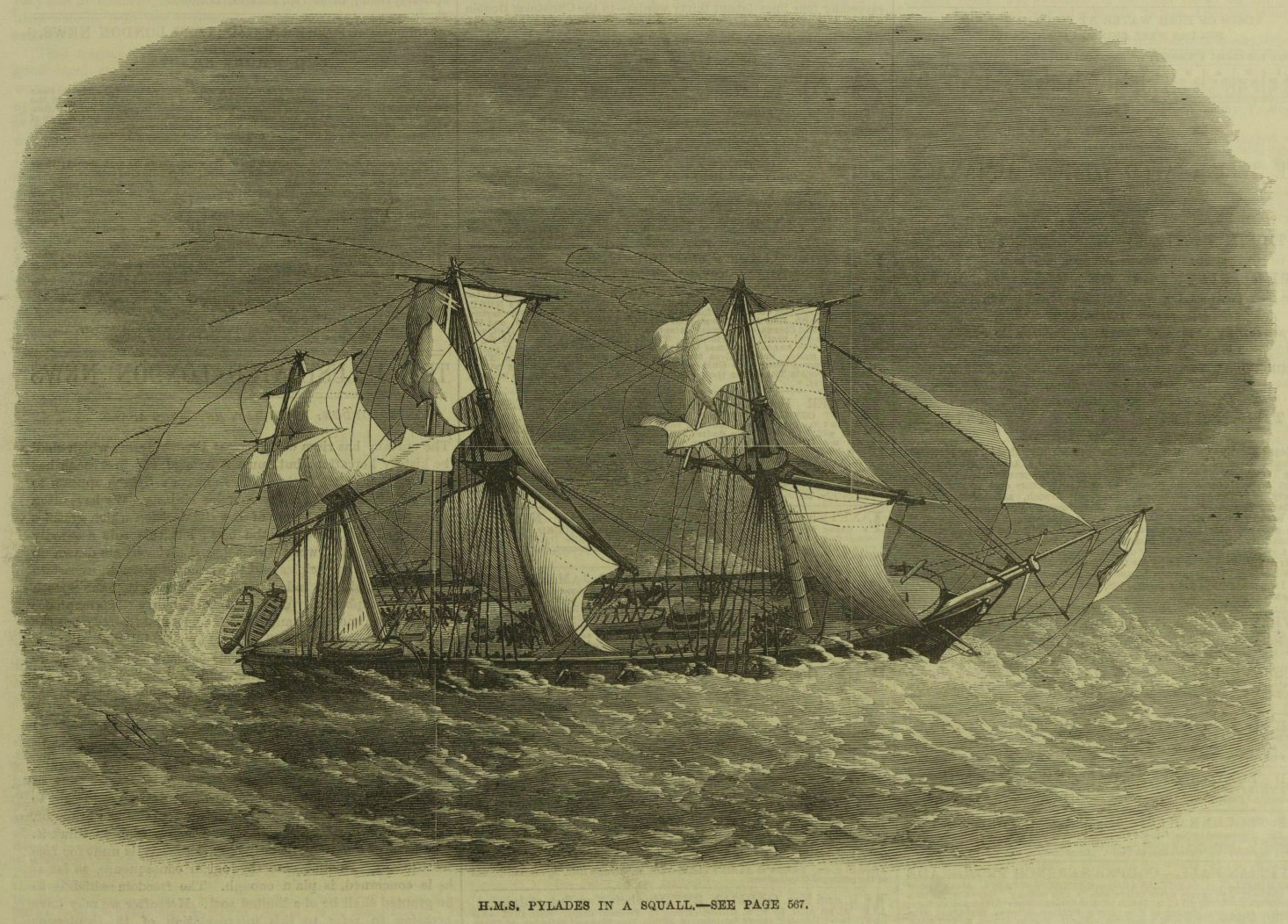
- Pylades at sea on 12 October 1869

History

United Kingdom
- Name: Pylades
- Namesake: Pylades
- Builder: Sheerness Dockyard
- Laid down: 9 May 1853
- Launched: 23 November 1854
- Completed: 29 March 1855
- Commissioned: 5 January 1855
- Out of service: 31 December 1873
- Fate: Sold to be broken up 23 January 1875

Class overview
- Name: Pylades class
- Preceded by: Highflyer class
- Succeeded by: Cossack class

General characteristics (as built)
- Class & type: Pylades-class corvette
- Displacement: 1,956 long tons (1,987 t)
- Tons burthen: 1,267 bm
- Length: 192 ft 9 in (58.75 m) o/a; 165 ft 0.5 in (50.30 m) pp
- Beam: 38 ft 4 in (11.68 m)
- Draught: 19 ft 7 in (5.97 m)
- Installed power: 1,106 ihp (825 kW)
- Propulsion: 2-cylinder steam engine; Single screw
- Sail plan: Full-rigged ship
- Speed: 10.1 kn (19 km/h; 12 mph)
- Complement: 250
- Armament: 20 × 8 in (200 mm) SBML guns; 1 × 10 in (250 mm) pivot gun

HMS Pylades was the sole member of the Pylades class of first-class screw corvettes that served in the Victorian Royal Navy. Pylades was a development of the previous Highflyer class with a greater beam. The vessel served under two commanders who later became admirals, Captains Arthur Acland Hood and Edwin Tennyson-d'Eyncourt. A third commander was Captain Michael de Courcy, remembered in the name of De Courcy Island, one of the Gulf Islands off the coast of British Columbia along with Pylades Island, which is named for the corvette. In 1855, Pylades served in the Baltic Sea during the Crimean War. In 1859, the vessel was the last Royal Navy warship to visit the San Juan Islands during the San Juan Boundary Dispute. In 1863, the ship's presence helped diffuse the Chesapeake affair that could have led to the British Empire joining the American Civil War. After serving across the British Empire, the ship was decommissioned and sold to be broken up in 1875.

== Design and development ==
In May 1850, the Surveyor of the Navy Baldwin Walker was managing the transition from sail to steam across the navy at the time of budget constraints. The first fifth-rate screw frigates had just been ordered, the Highflyer class, which would be later rerated as first-class corvettes. A follow-on order of four frigates of 1,500 bm was made. However, this was amended to one frigate, Aurora, and the remaining three vessels were downgraded to smaller corvettes. One these was Pylades, originally ordered on 24 December 1852 as an additional Highflyer. The design was revised before being laid down, with a wider beam, and the new vessel became the sole member of the Pylades class.

The corvette had an overall length of 192 ft 9 in (58.75 m) and a length between perpendiculars of 165 ft 0.5 in (50.30 m), with a beam of 38 ft 4 in (11.68 m) and design draught of 19 ft 7 in (5.97 m). Design displacement was 1,956 long tons (1,987 t) and 1,268 bm although the vessel was 1,267 bm as completed. The ship was equipped with a horizontal single expansion marine steam engine built by John Penn and Sons that had two cylinders, each with 55 in (1.4 m) bore and 5 ft (1.5 m) stroke. Rated at 350 horsepower (260 kW) and 1,106 indicated horsepower (825 kW), the engine drove a single shaft, to give a design speed of 10.119 knots (19 km/h; 12 mph). The screw had two blades, which caused the stern to oscillate while under steam. The engine was complemented by a ship-rig. Under sail, the vessel could attain 7 knots (13 km/h; 8.1 mph).

At launch, Pylades carried a heavier armament than any other corvette in the navy at the time. The main weapons consisted of twenty 8 in (200 mm) 42 cwt (Note: "Cwt" is the abbreviation for hundredweight, 42 cwt referring to the weight of the gun.) 32-pounder smooth bore muzzle loading (SBML) guns mounted on broadside trucks. Ten were mounted to each side. A single 10 in (250 mm) 95 cwt 68-pounder SBML pivot gun was mounted on the deck. Although installed at the bow, the pivot gun was flexible, being designed to be mounted both at the bow and stern and to fire both shells and shot. The ship had a complement of 250 officers and ratings.

== Construction and career ==
Laid down at Sheerness Dockyard on 9 May 1853, Pylades was named on 8 June and launched on 23 November the following year. The vessel cost £68,333, including £21,684 for machinery. The warship was commissioned on 5 January 1855 under the command of Captain, later Admiral, Edwin Tennyson-d'Eyncourt and completed on 29 March. The ship was the fourth to be given the name in Royal Navy service, which recalled the Greek prince Pylades. The vessel's first voyage was to the Nore and then to the Baltic Sea along with the sloop Volcano and a flotilla of gunboats on 11 May 1855. The vessel served as part of a blockade of Russian ports undertaken by the French and British forces during the Crimean War. Attempts were also made to attack Russian forts such as Fort Alexander, but the defences were too strong and these proved ineffective. The vessel did not serve in the conflict long and returned to Portsmouth for repairs, which were completed on 5 June the following year. The corvette then sailed across the Atlantic Ocean to Halifax, Nova Scotia, returning on 27 October. The voyage had not been without peril and the vessel had been feared lost after disappearing 18 days beforehand.

After being paid off on 18 November and repaired, Pylades was recommissioned on 16 July 1857 under Captain Michael de Courcy. The vessel recrossed the Atlantic Ocean to serve with the North America and West Indies Station before joining the East Indies and China Station and finally the Pacific Station. The corvette served at the Royal Navy base in Singapore until deployed to Canada, arriving on 18 February 1858. Although initially sent to help handle the Fraser Canyon Gold Rush, the vessel's presence also proved useful during the San Juan Boundary Dispute during the following year. On 7 December, Pylades was the last Royal Navy warship to be deployed to the San Juan Islands, after which the risk of conflict de-escalated. At the end of the service, the corvette sailed to Chatham to be decommissioned on 20 July 1861. An extensive refit was carried out, with much of the copper and wooden hull replaced, the decks removed and the boilers repaired. A new armament was fitted, with the main deck equipped with sixteen cast iron 8 in (200 mm) 60 cwt guns each 8 ft 10 in (2.69 m) long and four Armstrong 4.75 in (121 mm) 40-pounder 28 cwt guns. On the upper deck, a single Armstrong 7 in (180 mm) 110-pounder 82 cwt gun was mounted. The ship was equipped with a new 15 ft 9 in (4.80 m) screw and, while undertaking trials on 31 December, achieved a speed of 10.373 knots (19.211 km/h; 11.937 mph).

The ship, now rated at 1,278 bm, departed for the North America and West Indies Station on 13 January 1863 under the command of Captain, later Admiral, Arthur Acland Hood. While serving in Canada, the vessel played a role in the Chesapeake affair that took place during the American Civil War. When the British sailing vessel Chesapeake, captured by Confederate sympathisers and pursued by US Navy warships, arrived in Canadian waters, the vessel's presence helped stop the situation escalating to a declaration of war between the British Empire and Union forces. By this time, the corvette was old and was deemed unlikely to last beyond 1868. The vessel returned to the Nore on 29 October 1866 for an extensive overhaul, which extended the ship's life substantially. Recommissioned on 4 December 1867 the vessel served under the command of Captain Cecil Buckley, later a recipient of the Victoria Cross, as part of the Pacific Station until 1870 and then off the coast of South America between 20 July 1871 and 20 August 1873 under the command of Captain Augustus Chetham Strode. The ship was finally decommissioned on 31 December at Sheerness. Pylades was sold to be broken up on 23 January 1875 to Castle in Charlton.

== Legacy ==
Pylades is recalled in the name of Pylades Island, one of the Gulf Islands off the coast of British Columbia. This is not the only local name related to the vessel. Nearby De Courcy Island is named for Michael de Courcy. The other islands of the De Courcy Group, Mudge and Ruxton Islands also recall sailors connected with the corvette, both named William. Similarly, Buckley Point, south of the mouth of the Skeena River, and Cecil Point north of Pitt Island are named after Cecil Buckley, who commanded Pylades off the coast of British Columbia between 1868 and 1869.
