= Pirates Cove Marine Provincial Park =

Provincial park in British Columbia, Canada

- IUCN category II (national park)
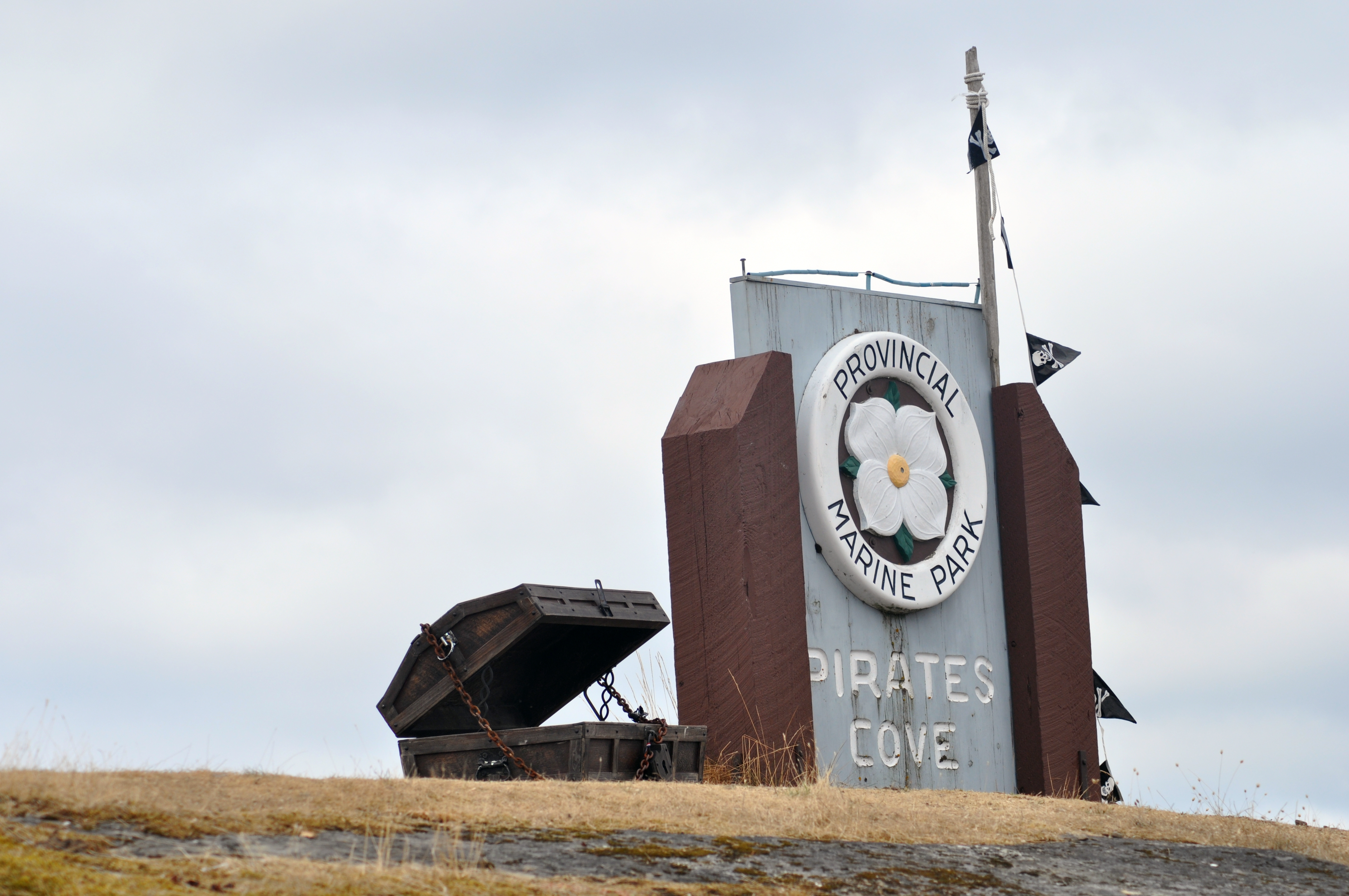
- Panoramic view

- Location within Vancouver Island Location within British Columbia
- Interactive map of Pirates Cove Marine Provincial Park
- Location: British Columbia, Canada
- Nearest city: Nanaimo
- Coordinates: 49°05′46″N 123°43′33″W
- Area: 0.32 km^{2} (0.12 sq mi)
- Established: March 8, 1968
- Governing body: BC Parks

Pirates Cove Marine Provincial Park is a provincial park on De Courcy Island in British Columbia, Canada.

The area of the park was historically used by local First Nations, with shell middens indicating their presence up to 3,000 years before the present day. In the early 1900's, the site was a homestead for the Aquarian Foundation cult led by Edward Arthur Wilson (also referred to as "Brother XII"), who enticed approximately 8,000 followers to area in the 1920's and 1930's.

== Sources ==
- BC Parks, Ministry of Environment, Accessed January 17, 2019
- Google Maps link, Accessed August 7, 2006
- "Pirates Cove Marine Park". BC Geographical Names. Government of British Columbia – B.C. Geographical Names Office (BCGNO).
