= Thomas Highflyer =

Former East African slave

Thomas Highflyer (1858 – 20 June 1870) was a formerly enslaved child who was born in East Africa and who later lived and died in Brighton.

== Rescue ==
He was one of 152 Africans found on an Arabian ship off the coast of Zanzibar on August 24, 1866 by HMS Highflyer. He and several other boys were put to work on HMS Highflyer, with Thomas working as a valet before disembarking in Brighton in 1868. He was named Thomas Malcolm Sabine Highflyer after ship captain Thomas Malcolm Sabine Paisley.

== Life in Brighton ==
He lived in a lodging house in Great College Street, Kemp Town, with Henry and Eliza Thompson, who wanted him to be educated. He attended St. Mark's School in Whitehawk, where the headmaster encouraged other pupils to welcome him. He attended All Souls Church, near Kemp Town, which was the first church built by Reverend Henry Wagner. Thomas's life story was told in a contemporary book dedicated to teaching young people about Christianity and how the word of God was spread across the globe to such lands and Africa and India.

=== Death ===
In 1870, he died from tuberculosis and dropsy, aged only 12.

== Grave ==
Thomas Highflyer was buried in Woodvale Cemetery, in Brighton. Bert Williams, co-founder of Brighton and Hove Black History, said: "The English climate didn’t suit him. But you can tell by the expensive gravestone at Woodvale that he was loved. He was treated like a son by Mrs Thompson".

In January 2018 his gravestone was removed for restoration work. In June 2018 a ceremony was held to lay a new gravestone for him. The ceremony included pupils from Thomas' former school, Bert Williams, president of Brighton and Hove Black History, and Paul Campbell, a representative of the council. Brighton & Hove Buses named one of their bus fleet Thomas Highflyer in 2018. His life story is told on panels inside the bus.
