= HMS Tartar (1854) =

Wooden screw corvette

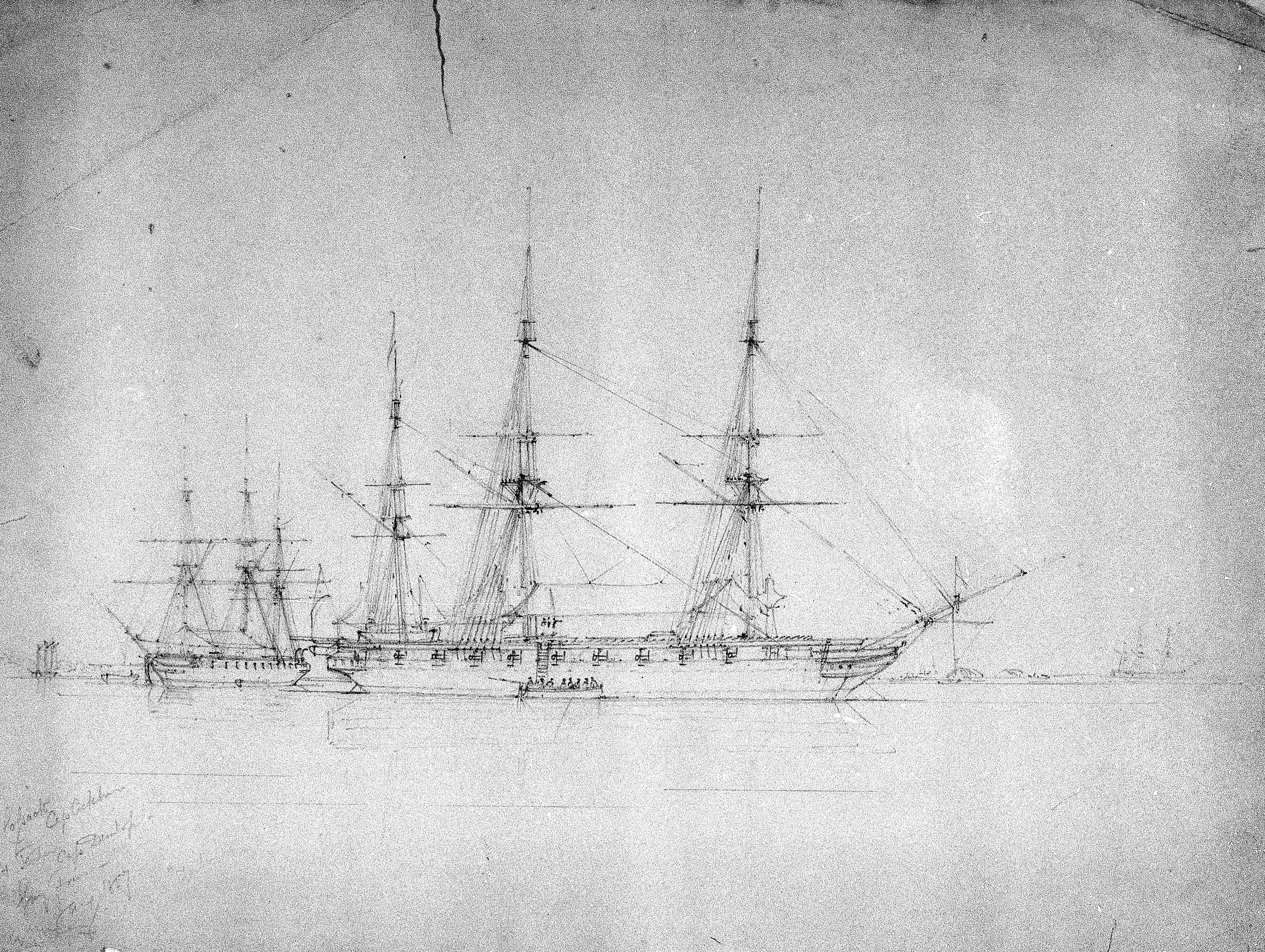
- HMS Tartar with HMS Cossack

History

Russian Empire
- Name: Voin (Russian: "Воин")
- Builder: W. & H. Pitcher, Northfleet
- Out of service: Seized while under construction in 1854

United Kingdom
- Name: HMS Tartar
- Launched: 17 May 1854
- Completed: 26 January 1855
- Acquired: 5 April 1854
- Fate: Broken up in February 1866

General characteristics
- Class & type: Cossack-class corvette
- Displacement: 1,965 long tons (1,997 t)
- Length: 195 ft (59 m)
- Beam: 39 ft (12 m)
- Draught: 9 ft (2.7 m)
- Propulsion: 2-cyl horizontal single-expansion steam engine; Single screw
- Sail plan: Full-rigged ship
- Armament: 18 guns (two 110-pdrs, four 40-pdrs and fourteen 8-inch)

HMS Tartar was a wooden screw corvette of the Royal Navy. Originally built for the Russian Empire, she was seized by British forces on 5 April 1854, shortly before her launch.

== History ==
HMS Tartar was built by W. & H. Pitcher at Northfleet on the river Thames, alongside her sister ship, HMS Cossack, for the Russians. They were confiscated by the British prior to their completion, and Tartar was launched on 17 May 1854.

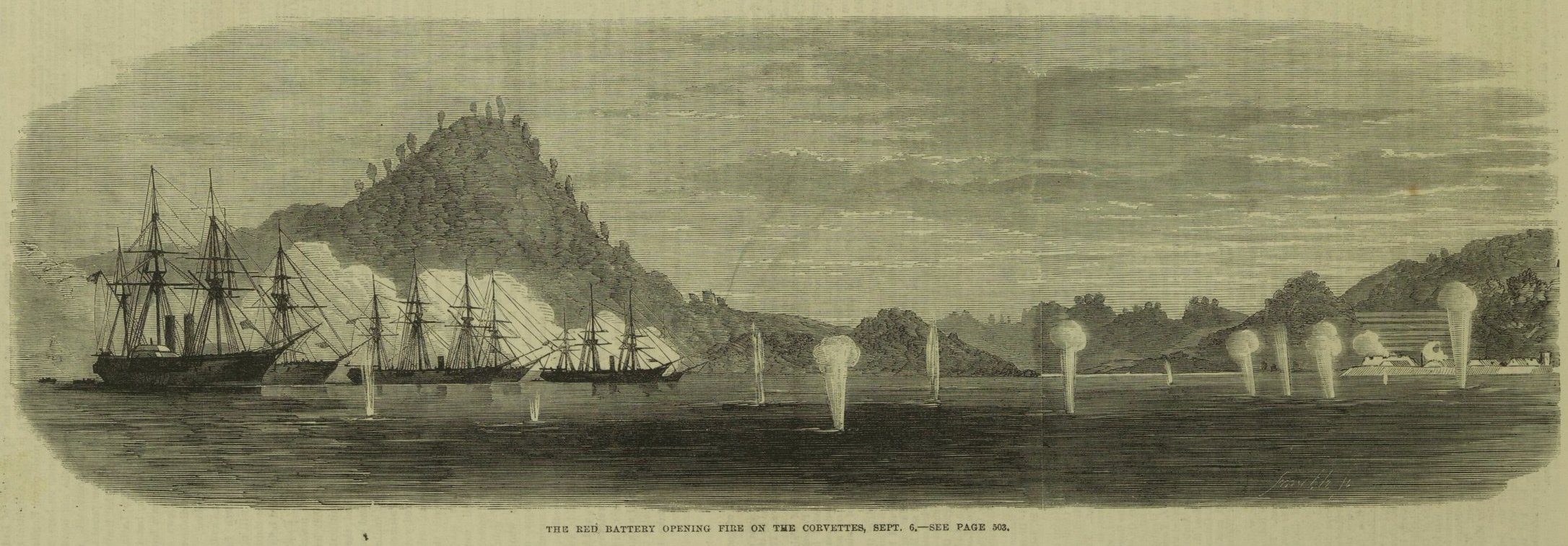
The Red Battery opening fire on the Allied corvettes, including Tartar, at the Bombardment of Shimonoseki, 1864

She was fitted for British service from 14 December of that same year. From 1854 to 1859, Tartar was in active service throughout the Crimean War, and served on the North America and West Indies Station. During that period, Captain Hugh Dunlop was the captain of HMS Tartar. For her service in the Baltic she was awarded the battle honour Baltic 1855. In 1860 she sailed from Sheerness Dockyard under Captain John Montagu Hayes for service in the Pacific, primarily in Japan. She underwent repairs in South Africa during her voyage to Japan. HMS Tartar was then involved in the Shimonoseki campaign of 1863-1864 and was involved in the bombardment of Shimonoseki itself.

After the Shimonoseki conflict, the ship remained at Sheerness before being sold to Castle shipbreakers and being broken up at Charlton. She was in commission for a total of five years in Japan and China, and five during the Crimean War.
