= Arthur Hood, 1st Baron Hood of Avalon =

Royal Navy Admiral (1824–1901)

Admiral The Right Honourable The Lord Hood of Avalon GCB
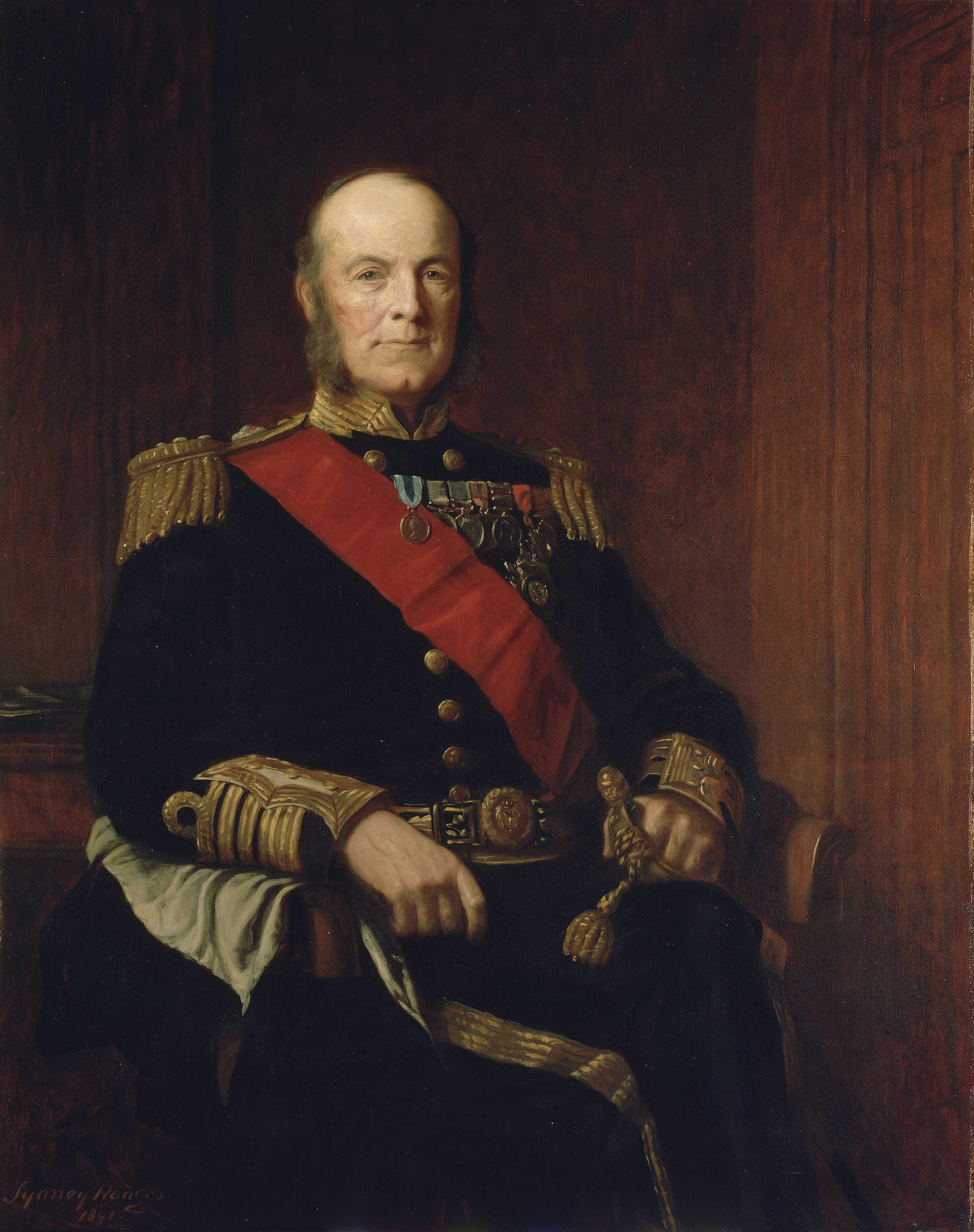
- Lord Hood of Avalon
- Born: 14 July 1824; Bath, Somerset
- Died: 16 November 1901 (aged 77); Glastonbury, Somerset
- Military career
- Allegiance: United Kingdom
- Branch: Royal Navy
- Service years: 1836–1889
- Rank: Admiral
- Commands: First Naval Lord; Channel Fleet; HMS Monarch; HMS Excellent; HMS Pylades; HMS Acorn
- Conflicts: Oriental Crisis; Crimean War; Second Opium War
- Awards: Knight Grand Cross of the Order of the Bath; Order of the Medjidie, 5th Class (Ottoman Empire)

Admiral Arthur William Acland Hood, 1st Baron Hood of Avalon, GCB (14 July 1824 – 16 November 1901) was an officer of the Royal Navy. As a junior officer he took part in the capture of Acre during the Oriental Crisis in 1840 and went ashore with the naval brigade at the defence of Eupatoria in November 1854 during the Crimean War. He became First Naval Lord in June 1885 and in that role was primarily concerned with enshrining into law the recommendations contained in a report on the disposition of the ships of the Royal Navy many of which were unarmoured and together incapable of meeting the combined threat from any two of the other naval powers ("the Two-power Standard"): these recommendations were contained in the Naval Defence Act 1889.

== Early career ==
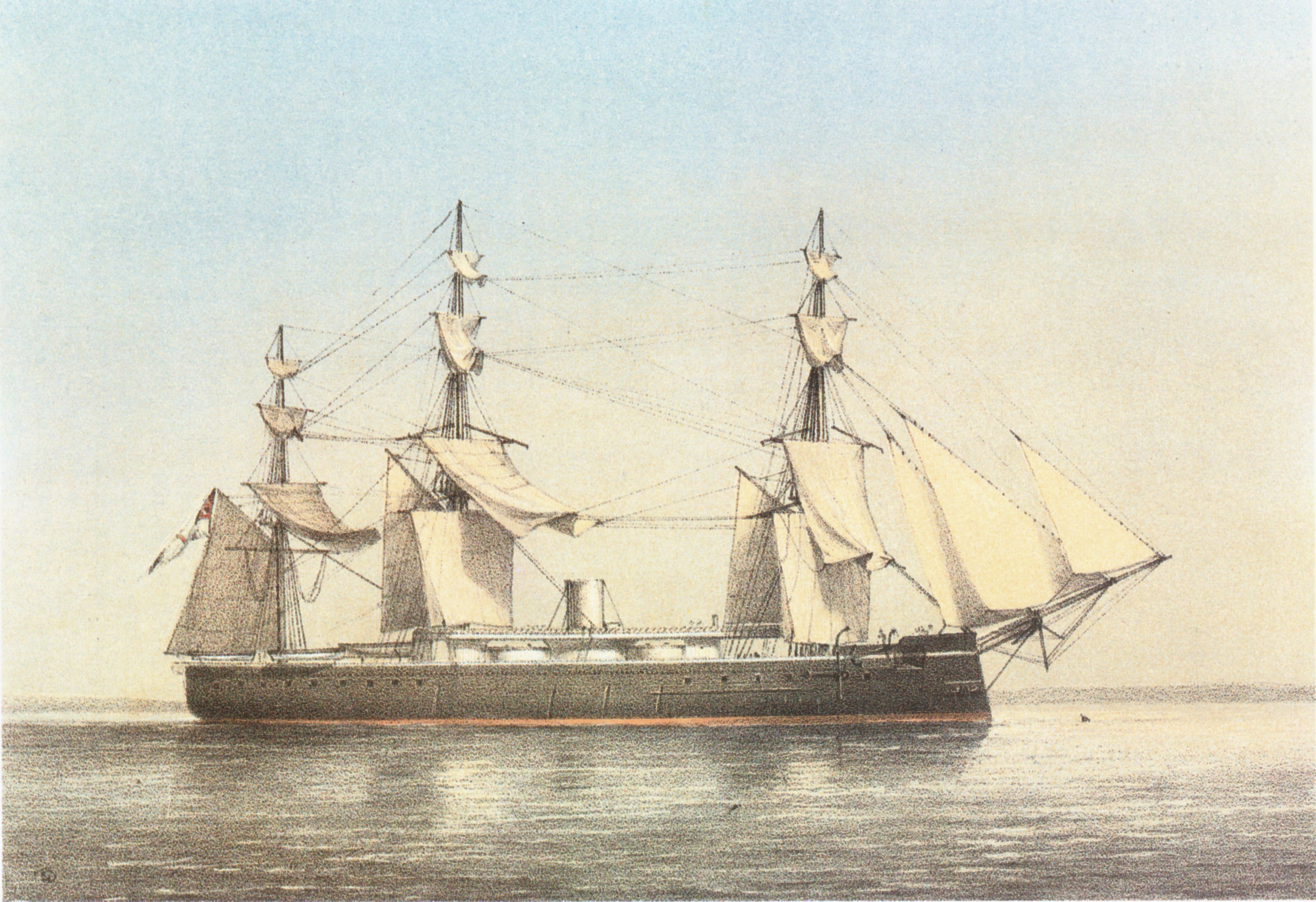
The turret ship HMS Monarch which Hood commanded

Hood was born the younger son of Sir Alexander Hood, 2nd Baronet and Amelia Anne Hood (née Bateman). His grandfather, Captain Alexander Hood, had been killed in action during the French Revolutionary Wars; he fell whilst in command of HMS Mars, in action with the French 74-gun ship Hercule on 2 April 1798.

Hood entered the Royal Navy in 1836 and served on the north coast of Spain and afterwards on the coast of Syria taking part in the capture of Acre in November 1840 during the Oriental Crisis. After passing through the established course of gunnery on board HMS Excellent in 1844–1845, he went out to the Cape of Good Hope as gunnery mate of the fourth-rate HMS President, the flagship of Rear-Admiral Dacres, who promoted him to lieutenant on 9 January 1846. In January 1850 he transferred to the fourth-rate HMS Arethusa serving with her in the Channel Squadron, in the Mediterranean Fleet and then in the Black Sea: he went ashore with the naval brigade and took part in the defence of Eupatoria in November 1854 during the Crimean War. He was appointed to the Turkish Order of the Medjidie, 5th class for his services in the Crimea.

Promoted to commander on 27 November 1854 in recognition of his services at Eupatoria, Hood was given command of the brig HMS Acorn on the China Station in May 1856, and arrived in time to take part in the destruction of the junks in the Battle of Fatshan Creek in June 1857 and in the Battle of Canton in December 1857 during the Second Opium War.

Promoted to captain on 26 February 1858 in recognition of his services in China, Hood was given command of HMS Pylades on the North America and West Indies Station in December 1862 and then became captain of the gunnery school HMS Excellent as well as Director of the Royal Naval College at Portsmouth in September 1866. He went on to be Director of Naval Ordnance at the Admiralty in 1869. He was thoroughly acquainted with the routine work of the office and the established armament of the navy, but he had not the power of adapting himself to the changes which were being called for, and still less of initiating them, so that during his period of office the armament of the ships remained behind the general advance. Nevertheless, having been appointed a Companion of the Order of the Bath on 20 May 1871, he became captain of the turret ship HMS Monarch in the Channel Squadron in June 1874.

== Senior command ==
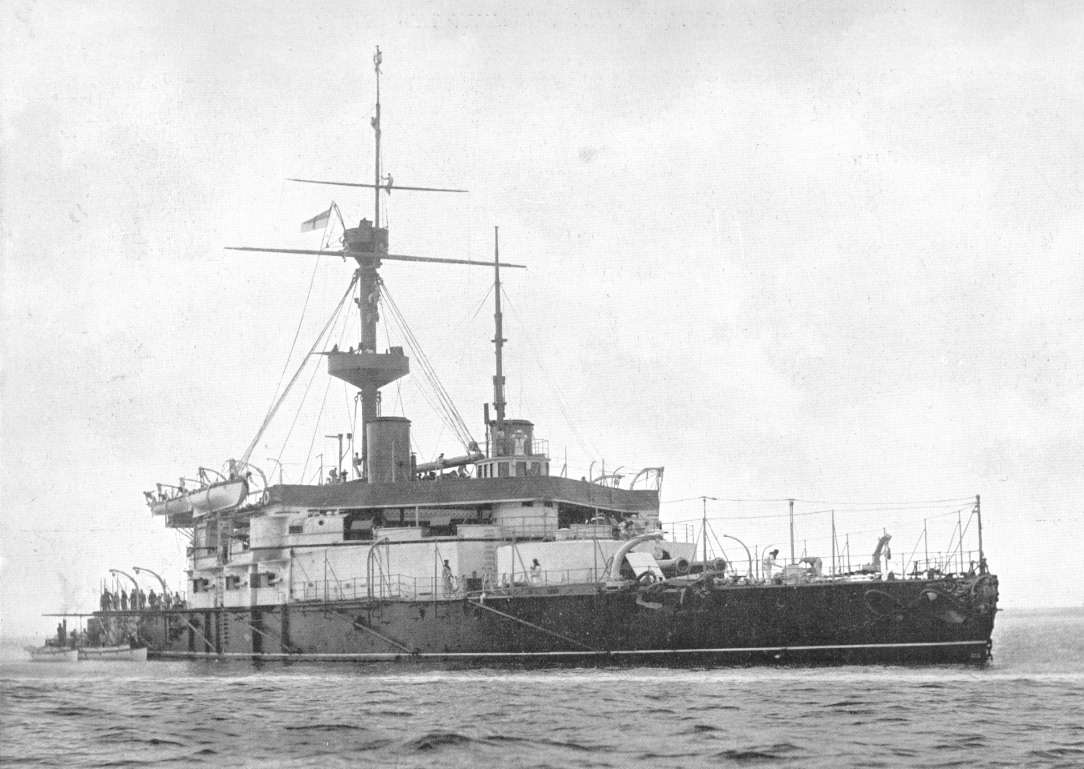
HMS Trafalgar, a ship of the type which Hood favoured and which he was instrumental in delivering into service

Promoted to rear admiral on 22 March 1876, he became Second Naval Lord in January 1877 and then Commander-in-Chief of the Channel Squadron in December 1879 with promotion to vice admiral on 23 July 1880.

Hood was appointed First Naval Lord in June 1885, advanced to Knight Commander of the Order of the Bath on 19 December 1885 and promoted to full admiral on 18 January 1886. He stood down in March 1886, just nine months after taking office, when the Marquis of Ripon was appointed First Lord of the Admiralty but was restored to his position when William Gladstone's Liberal Government fell from power in August 1886. As First Naval Lord he favoured low freeboard turret battleships and was instrumental in ensuring the Trafalgar-class battleships entered service. However he was primarily concerned with enshrining into law the recommendations contained in a report on the disposition of the ships of the Royal Navy many of which were unarmoured and together incapable of meeting the combined threat from any two of the other naval powers ("the Two-power Standard"): these recommendations were contained in the Naval Defence Act 1889. He retired on attaining the age of sixty-five in July 1889.

Hood was advanced to Knight Grand Cross of the Order of the Bath on 3 September 1889 and raised to the peerage as Baron Hood of Avalon, in the County of Somerset on 23 February 1892, a title that became extinct on his death. After two years of ill health, he died at his nephew's house in Glastonbury on 16 November 1901 and was buried at Butleigh in Somerset on 23 November 1901.

== Family ==
In 1855 Hood married Fanny Henrietta, daughter of Sir Charles Maclean, 9th Baronet; they had two daughters. Emily born 1859 married the cricketer Francis MacKinnon; whilst his second child Fanny Sophia married Henry Allen in 1895.

== See also ==
- O'Byrne, William Richard (1849). "Hood, Arthur William Acland" . A Naval Biographical Dictionary . John Murray – via Wikisource.

== Sources ==
- Hesilrige, Arthur G. M. (1921). Debrett's Peerage and Titles of courtesy. Fleet street, London, UK: Dean & Son. p. 484.
- Heathcote, Tony (2002). The British Admirals of the Fleet 1734 – 1995. Pen & Sword Ltd. ISBN 0-85052-835-6.
- William Loney RN Career History

Military offices
Preceded by Sir Geoffrey Hornby	Second Naval Lord; 1877–1879	Succeeded by Earl of Clanwilliam
Preceded by Lord John Hay	Commander-in-Chief, Channel Fleet; 1880–1882	Succeeded by Sir William Dowell
Preceded by Sir Astley Key	First Naval Lord; 1885–1886	Succeeded by Lord John Hay
Preceded by Lord John Hay	First Naval Lord; 1886–1889	Succeeded by Sir Richard Hamilton
Peerage of the United Kingdom
New creation	Baron Hood of Avalon; 1892–1901	Extinct
