= Highflyer-class corvette =

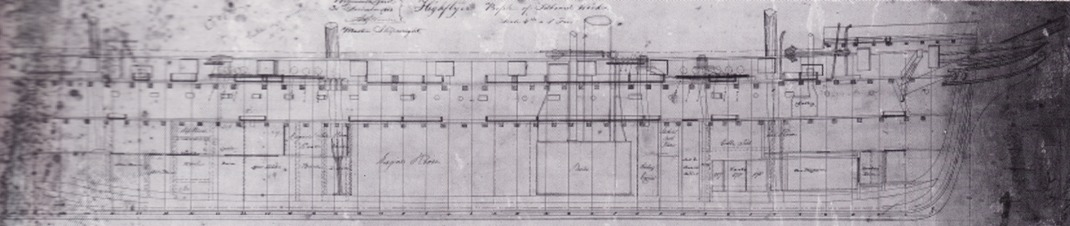
- Profile of Highflyer dated 1863

Class overview
- Name: Highflyer class
- Operators: Royal Navy
- Preceded by: None
- Succeeded by: HMS Pylades
- Built: 1851–1854
- In service: 1852–1871
- Completed: 2
- Scrapped: 2

General characteristics
- Type: Wooden screw corvette
- Displacement: 1,737 1/2 tons
- Tons burthen: 1,153 bm
- Length: 192 ft (59 m) oa; 167 ft 3 3/4 in (50.997 m) pp
- Beam: 36 ft 4 in (11.07 m)
- Draught: 15 ft 9 in (4.80 m)
- Depth of hold: 22 ft 8 in (6.91 m)
- Installed power: Highflyer: 702 ihp (523 kW); Esk: 657 ihp (490 kW)
- Propulsion: Highflyer: 2-cylinder horizontal single-expansion steam engine; Single screw; Esk: 2-cylinder inclined single-expansion oscillating steam engine; Single screw
- Sail plan: Full-rigged ship
- Speed: 9.4 kn (17.4 km/h) under steam
- Armament: As built: 21 guns: 1 × 10-inch/84-pdr (85cwt) gun; 20 × 32-pounder (42cwt) long guns; Later: 1 × 10-inch/84-pdr (85cwt) gun; 18 × 8-inch guns

The Highflyer-class corvettes were a pair of 21-gun wooden screw corvettes built in the 1850s for the Royal Navy.

== Design ==
Highflyer was ordered as a small wooden frigate to a design by the Surveyor's Department of the Admiralty on 25 April 1847; she and her sister Esk were re-designated as corvettes in 1854. These ships were envisaged as steam auxiliaries, intended to cruise under sail with the steam engine available for assistance. Commensurately they were provided with a full square sailing rig. Esk was built in exchange for HMS Greenock (which went to the Australian Royal Mail Co.) The words of the Admiralty Order stated she should be "a wood screw vessel complete of Highflyer's [class] in exchange when built".

== Propulsion ==
Highflyer was given a geared two-cylinder horizontal single-expansion steam engine, provided by Maudslay, Sons & Field, which developed 702 indicated horsepower (523 kW) and drove a single screw. Esk was provided with an oscillating two-cylinder inclined single-expansion steam engine, provided by the builders, was quite different from Highflyer's, but developed broadly the same power — 657 indicated horsepower (490 kW) — and drove a single screw.

== Armament ==
The class was a 21-gun corvette, mounting twenty 32-pounder (42 cwt) long guns in a broadside arrangement, and a single 10-inch 84-pounder (85 cwt) gun on a pivot. Both ships later swapped their broadside 32-pounders for eighteen 8-inch guns.

== Construction ==
Highflyer was built at Leamouth Wharf by C J Mare & Co., while Esk was ordered from the Millwall yard of J. Scott Russell & Co. on the River Thames.

== Ships ==
Ship	Builder	Laid down	Launched	Completed	Fate
Highflyer	C J Mare & Co.	January 1850	13 August 1851	10 April 1852	Broken up, May 1871
Esk	J. Scott Russell & Co.	April 1853	12 June 1854	21 December 1854	Broken up, 1870
