= Ruxton Island =

Island in British Columbia, Canada

Coordinates: 49°05′N 123°42′W

Ruxton Island (population 10) is one of the six islands in the De Courcy Islands group. It is one of the southern Gulf Islands in British Columbia. It is due south-east of DeCourcy Island, being separated by Ruxton Passage.

In 1887, there was a land rush on the DeCourcey group of islands, sparked by the prospect of a coal seam running to them from Nanaimo. William Flewett of London, England bought up the remainder of DeCourcey Island, and Ruxton Island (then called Flewett’s Island). Only small coal deposits were ever discovered, though efforts to find a workable vein continued for several years.

Ruxton Island also has some loose historical connections to Brother XII.

Ruxton Island is home to approximately seven year round cabins and 110 seasonally occupied cabins.

The island is composed primarily of sandstone. At the north end is Ruxton Passage, which separates Ruxton Island and De Courcy Island. At the southern end is Whaleboat Passage which separates Ruxton from Pylades.

The island is forested with Douglas fir, balsam fir, red cedar, maple, vine maple, arbutus, shore pine, Garry oak, Red Alder and willow trees.

There are approximately 12 km of trails.

The few mammals that inhabit the island include otters, mink, Douglas squirrels, mice, and a few homo sapiens.

The entrance to Herring Bay is marked at the north west corner, and entrance to Herring bay should be made between this marker and the small islet to the east. At low tide, the reef, which dries out at anything except high tide, extends several hundred yards to the south east. The reef continues underwater and is frequently hit by visiting vessels. This islet was recently named "Long Point" in honour of Ted Long, who was resident here for many years.

There is a smaller bay located about halfway down the island on the west side, locally known as Nayler Bay, after the Nayler family who sold the island to Frank Ney (former mayor of Nanaimo, B.C.) who in turn developed the island into the current 199 privately owned lots. Typical waterfront properties are roughly 1/2 an acre in size, and the inside lots are roughly 2 acres in size.

There is a wetland in the middle of the island which is roughly 10 acres in size. Canada Geese usually nest in this wetland, and many pairs may be seen during their visiting season. Numerous smaller waterfowl and frogs inhabit the wetland year round.

North Bay and Otter Bay are located at the north and east sides of Ruxton Island respectively.
