= HMS Esk (1854) =

Highflyer-class screw corvette (1854-1870)

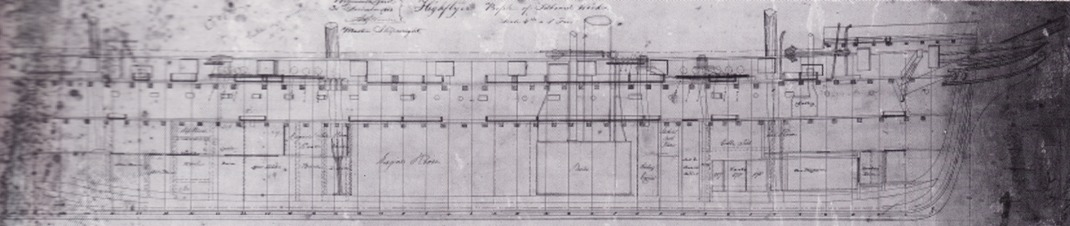
- Profile of Esk's sister-ship Highflyer dated 1863

History

United Kingdom
- Name: HMS Esk
- Ordered: 18 August 1852
- Builder: J. Scott Russell & Co., Millwall
- Laid down: April 1853
- Launched: 12 June 1854
- Commissioned: 21 December 1854
- Decommissioned: 1868
- Fate: Broken up at Portsmouth in 1870

General characteristics
- Class & type: Highflyer-class corvette
- Displacement: 1,737 1/2 tons
- Tons burthen: 1,153 bm
- Length: 192 ft (59 m) oa; 167 ft 3 3/4 in (50.997 m) pp
- Beam: 36 ft 4 in (11.07 m)
- Draught: 15 ft 9 in (4.80 m)
- Depth of hold: 22 ft 8 in (6.91 m)
- Installed power: 657 ihp (490 kW)
- Propulsion: 2-cylinder inclined single-expansion oscillating steam engine; Single screw
- Sail plan: Full-rigged ship
- Speed: 9.4 kn (17.4 km/h) under steam
- Armament: As built: 21 guns: 1 × 10-inch/84-pdr (85cwt) gun; 20 × 32-pounder (42cwt) long guns; Later: 1 × 10-inch/84-pdr (85cwt) gun; 18 × 8-inch guns

HMS Esk was a 21-gun Highflyer-class screw corvette launched on 12 June 1854 from J. Scott Russell & Co., Millwall. She saw action in the Crimean War, the Second Opium War and the Tauranga Campaign in New Zealand, and was broken up at Portsmouth in 1870.

== Design ==
Esk was built in exchange for HMS Greenock (which went to the Australian Royal Mail Co.) by J. Scott Russell & Co. The words of the Admiralty Order stated she should be "a wood screw vessel complete of Highflyer's [class] in exchange when built". This made her a small wooden frigate to a design by the Surveyor's Department of the Admiralty on 25 April 1847; she and her sister Highflyer were redesignated as corvettes in 1854. In common with other screw corvettes of the time, she was envisaged as a steam auxiliary, intended to cruise under sail with the steam engine available for assistance. Commensurately she was provided with a full square sailing rig. Her oscillating two-cylinder inclined single-expansion steam engine, provided by the builders, was quite different from Highflyer's, but developed broadly the same power — 657 indicated horsepower (490 kW) — and drove a single screw.

== Construction ==
She was laid down in April 1853 in the Millwall yard of J. Scott Russell & Co. on the River Thames. She was launched on 12 June 1854 and commissioned at Woolwich on 21 December 1854.

== Service history ==
She served in the Mediterranean Station between 1854 until 1856 and was in the Black Sea during the Crimean War. She was part of the East Indies Station between 1856 until 1863, where she participated in Second Opium War at Canton. Afterwards she went to the Australia Station, where she participated in the attack on Gate Pā during the Tauranga Campaign in New Zealand. Her commanding officer Captain John Fane Charles Hamilton was killed in the attack. She left the Australia Station on 2 July 1867.

== Fate ==
Arriving back in Britain in 1867, she was paid off in 1868 and was broken up in 1870 at Portsmouth.

== References and sources ==
Sources

- Bastock, John (1988), Ships on the Australia Station, Child & Associates Publishing Pty Ltd; Frenchs Forest, Australia. ISBN 0-86777-348-0
- Lyon, David & Winfield, Rif (2004). The Sail and Steam Navy List: All the Ships of the Royal Navy 1815–1889. Chatham Publishing. ISBN 978-1-86176-032-6. OCLC 52620555.
