= Stuart Channel =

Channel in British Columbia, Canada

Coordinates: 48°59′06″N 123°43′30″W

Stuart Channel is a strait in the Gulf Islands region of the Gulf of Georgia, separating Vancouver Island on the west from Thetis, DeCourcy and Penelakut (Kuper) Islands on the east. Ladysmith Harbour and the town of Chemainus face onto it from Vancouver Island. It is crossed by a BC Ferries route serving Thetis and Penelakut Islands.

== Name ==
Called Sansum Channel by the Hudson's Bay Company, that name being related to Sansum Narrows just south between Vancouver Island and Saltspring Island, it was named for Captain Charles Edward Stuart (1817-1863), who was for a long time in charge of the Hudson's Bay Company post at Nanaimo.
