= Edwin Tennyson-d'Eyncourt =

Royal Navy Admiral (1813-1903)

Admiral Edwin Tennyson-d'Eyncourt CB
- Born: Edwin Clayton Tennyson; 4 July 1813
- Died: 14 January 1903 (aged 89); Warwick-square, London
- Spouse: Lady Henrietta Pelham-Clinton (m. 1859; died 1890)
- Relatives: Charles Tennyson-d'Eyncourt (father); Eustace Tennyson-d'Eyncourt (nephew); Alfred, Lord Tennyson (cousin)
- Military career
- Allegiance: United Kingdom
- Branch: Royal Navy
- Service years: 1826–1870
- Rank: Admiral
- Commands: HMS Desperate; HMS Pylades; HMS Edinburgh
- Conflicts: Crimean War
- Awards: Companion of the Bath

Admiral Edwin Clayton Tennyson-d'Eyncourt (4 July 1813 – 14 January 1903) was an officer in the Royal Navy.

== Early life ==
Edwin was the second son of Charles Tennyson and Frances Mary Hutton, the only child and heiress of the Rev. John Hutton, Rector of Lea. His paternal grandparents were Elizabeth (née Clayton) Tennyson and George Tennyson. Upon his grandfather's death in July 1835, his father inherited the family estates and changed his family's surname to Tennyson-d'Eyncourt. Through his younger brother Louis, he was uncle to Eustace Tennyson-d'Eyncourt, a naval architect who was the Navy's Director of Naval Construction.

He was a first cousin of the poet Alfred, Lord Tennyson. As a young man, he thoroughly embodied his family's social pretensions and their snobbish behaviour towards their poor relations, the Tennysons of Somersby; but in later years the mutual dislike between him and his famous cousin thawed, and he gave Alfred advice on the law of propriety of accepting the peerage offered to him in 1883.

== Career ==
Tennyson entered naval college in 1826 and became a lieutenant in 1837. He served in the South American, East Indies and China Stations during the 1840s, and HMS Calliope took part in the capture of Canton during the First Opium War. In 1854, he served in the Baltic campaign under Sir Charles Napier as captain of the gunboat HMS Desperate, and returned to that theatre in 1855 under Rear-Admiral Richard Saunders Dundas, as captain of the steam frigate HMS Pylades. From 1859 to 1862, he was captain of the blockship HMS Edinburgh as the guardship at Leith.

He was promoted to the rank of rear-admiral on 2 April 1866, and retired in 1870, continuing to rise to the rank of admiral on the retired list in March 1878. He was made a Companion of the Bath (CB) in 1873.

After the death of his elder brother George in 1871, he inherited the family estate known as Bayons Manor. In London, they lived in the Pimlico district at 56 Warwick Square.

== Personal life ==
On 1 March 1859, Tennyson-d'Eyncourt was married to Lady Henrietta Pelham-Clinton (1819–1890), the youngest surviving daughter of Henry Pelham-Clinton, 4th Duke of Newcastle, and his wife, the former Georgiana Elizabeth Mundy (daughter and heiress of Edward Miller Mundy of Shipley Hall). Together, they were the parents of:

- Henrietta Charlotte Tennyson-d'Eyncourt (1864–1951), who married Capt. Alfred Henry Tarleton of Breakspears, Uxbridge, in 1888. He served as Sheriff of Middlesex in 1903.

Lady Henrietta died on 19 August 1890. Tennyson-d'Eyncourt died at his residence 56 Warwick-square, London, on 14 January 1903.
