= De Courcy Island =

Island off the coast of British Columbia, Canada

Coordinates: 49°06′N 123°45′W

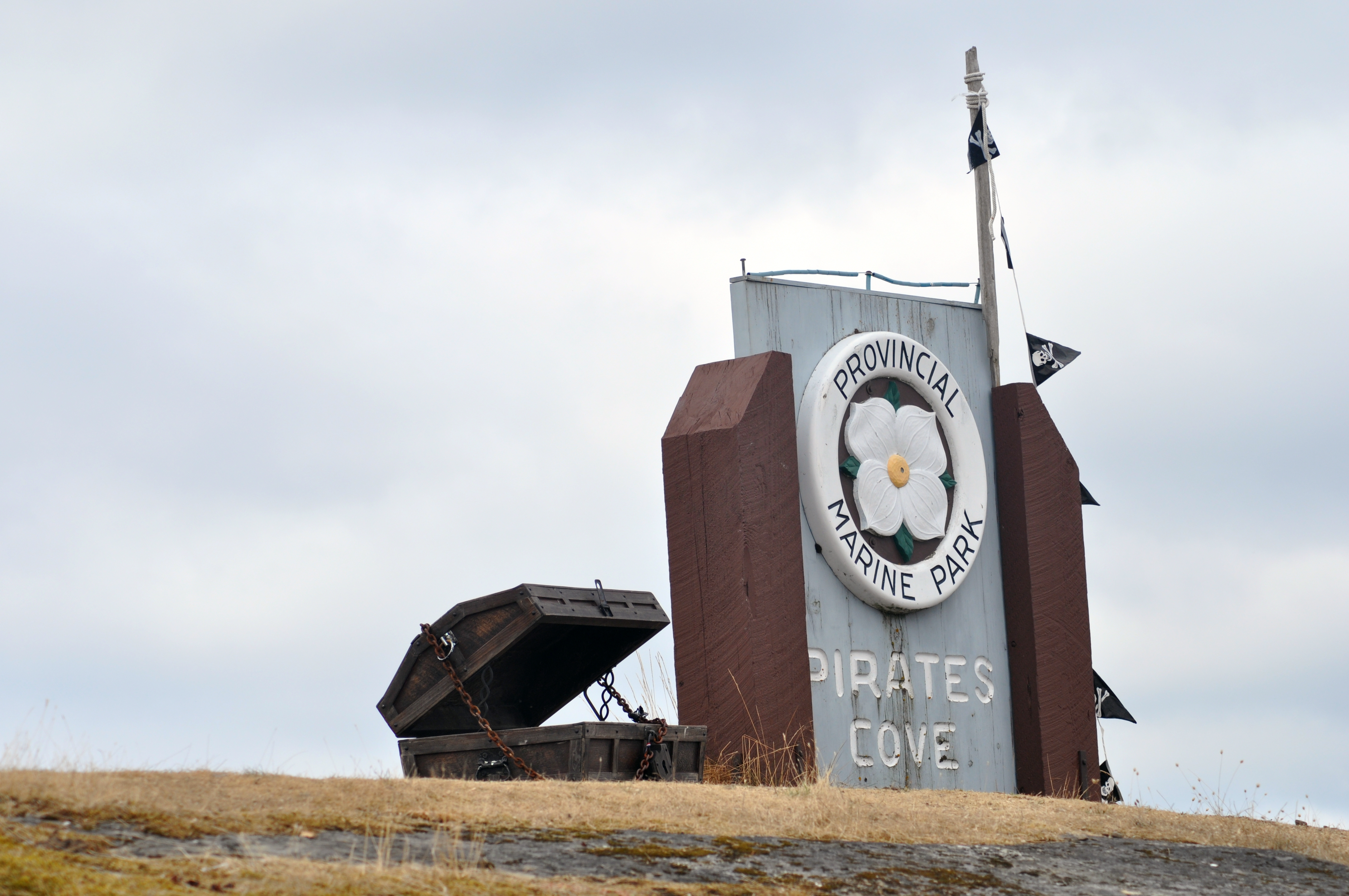
BC Parks marker for Pirate's Cove, De Courcy Island, British Columbia

De Courcy Island is one of the Gulf Islands of the coast of southwestern British Columbia, Canada, located between the Pylades and Stuart Channels approximately 16 km (9.9 mi) southeast of Nanaimo and approximately 38 km (24 mi) west of Vancouver.

The island, about 460 acres (186.2 ha) in area, gives its name to the De Courcy group of islands which consist, from north to south, of Mudge Island, Link Island, De Courcy Island, Ruxton Island and Pylades Island. This island group runs parallel to the east coast of Vancouver Island inside the protection of the larger Gabriola Island and Valdes Island. Access by boat from Nanaimo in the north is through Dodd Narrows. From Vancouver, vessels pass between Gabriola Island and Valdes Island through Gabriola Passage. Both Dodd Narrows and Gabriola Passage have strong tidal currents. Gabriola and Valdes Islands protect these smaller islands from the more open Strait of Georgia.

De Courcy Island is home to Pirates Cove Marine Provincial Park. The only access to the island is by boat or floatplane. Gulf Island Seaplanes flies to the island daily. It was also the home of Brother XII, a mysterious cult figure in the 1920s. The island is named after Vice Admiral Michael de Courcy, captain of HMS Pylades.
