= Cossack-class corvette =

British warship class

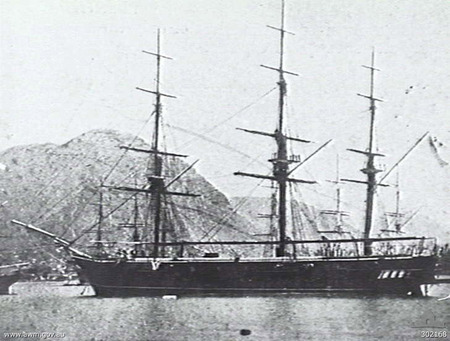
- HMS Cossack, 1860s

Class overview
- Name: Cossack class
- Builders: W. & H. Pitcher, Northfleet
- Operators: Royal Navy
- Preceded by: HMS Pylades
- Succeeded by: Pearl class
- Planned: 2
- Completed: 2
- Retired: 2

General characteristics
- Type: Corvette
- Displacement: 1,965 tons
- Tons burthen: 1,32260/94 tons bm
- Length: 195 ft (59 m) (gundeck); 172 ft 1.4 in (52.461 m) (keel)
- Beam: 38 ft 6 in (11.73 m)
- Height: 22 ft 4 in (6.81 m)
- Draught: 17 ft 7 in (5.36 m) (forward); 17 ft 8 in (5.38 m) (aft)
- Installed power: 250 nominal horsepower
- Propulsion: 2-cylinder horizontal single expansion steam engine; Single screw
- Crew: 270
- Armament: 18 × 68-pounder (60cwt) MLSB guns; 2 × 68-pounder (95cwt) guns

The Cossack-class corvettes were two 20-gun first-class corvettes, initially under construction in Britain for the Imperial Russian Navy. These ships were seized on 5 April 1854, after the outbreak of the Crimean War.

== History ==
The Imperial Russian Navy had ordered two ships, to be named Vityaz and Voin, for the sum of £46,198 (including £16,750 for the machinery) for both ships. After their seizure from the builders, HMS Cossack was bought for £9,591 (including £4,187 for the machinery) plus £715 for excess of tonnage on the ship, £2,206 for modifications made for British service. HMS Tartar was bought for £16,607 (including £4,187 for the machinery) plus £715 for excessive tonnage and £1,883 in modifications for British service. The ships' modifications and fittings were completed at Chatham Dockyard between 1854 and 1855.

== Characteristics ==
The two Cossack-class ships had eighteen 8in-guns on the upper deck, as well as two 68 pdr-pivot guns. Their crew complement was 270.

== Ships ==
- HMS Cossack
- HMS Tartar
