= John J. Audubon (brig) =

Shipwreck of a brig in Lake Huron, Michigan, United States

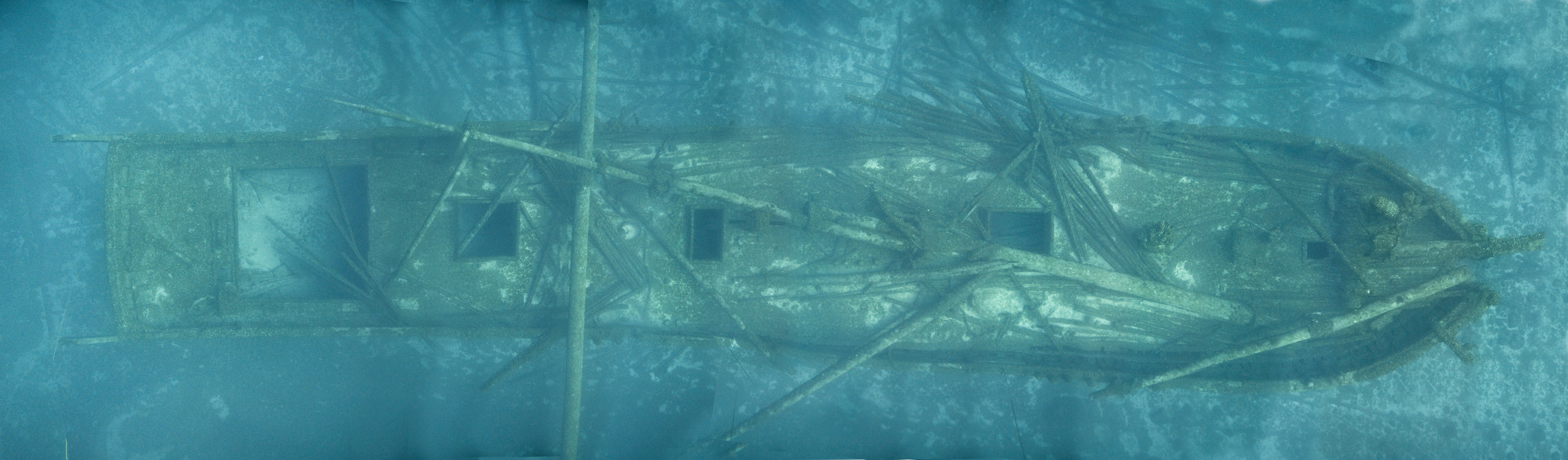
- Top view of the John J. Audubon

History

United States
- Name: John J. Audubon
- Operator: E. G. Merrick and Captain D. C. Pierce
- Builder: G. & W. Jones
- Launched: 1854
- Completed: 1854
- Acquired: 1854
- In service: 1854
- Out of service: 21 October 1854
- Fate: Sank following collision, October 21, 1854

General characteristics
- Type: Brig
- Tonnage: 370 tons (old style)
- Length: 148 ft (45 m)
- Notes: Built for Great Lakes freight transport

John J. Audubon was a wooden two-masted brig built in 1854 in Black River (Cleveland), Ohio by G. & W. Jones. Owned by E. G. Merrick and Captain D. C. Pierce of Detroit, the vessel was designed for rapid cargo transport across the Great Lakes. She was carrying a heavy load of railroad iron when it sank after a collision with the schooner Defiance on October 21, 1854.

== Description ==
John J. Audubon measured approximately 148 feet (45 m) in length, with a tonnage of 370. Constructed of wood with two masts, the brig was purpose-built for speed and cargo capacity, transporting iron bars westward to support railway expansion.

== Collision and sinking ==
On the foggy night of October 20, 1854, John J. Audubon was sailing northbound on Lake Huron en route to Chicago with 401 bars of railroad iron aboard.

Around 1:30 a.m. on October 21, she was struck midship by the southbound schooner Defiance through dense fog approximately five miles off Presque Isle, Michigan. The collision opened a deep gash in John J. Audubon's hull, causing her to sink rapidly. Defiance was also fatally damaged and sank shortly after a short drift.

Despite the speed of the disaster, all crew members from both vessels escaped in lifeboats and were later rescued by passing ships, including Ocean Wave and the steamer Mayflower. At the time of the sinking, John J. Audubon was estimated to be insured for $15,000, though salvage was deemed impossible due to the depth of water.

== The wreck ==
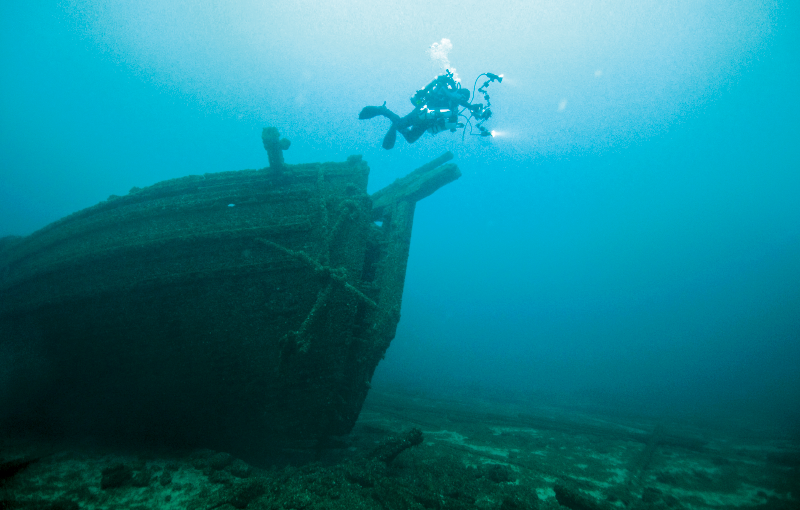
Diver examines the wreck of John J. Audubon

The wreck of John J. Audubon rests upright and largely intact in 170 feet (52 m) of cold, fresh water near Rockport, Michigan, in what is now the Thunder Bay National Marine Sanctuary. Her wooden hull is preserved, though the foremast has collapsed and her main mast lies across the deck.

The site is accessible to technical divers at 45°17.331′N 83°20.351′W. Just a few miles away lies the wreck of Defiance, which also remains upright in deeper water. The pair of wrecks have been studied by oceanographers such as Dr. Robert Ballard and Jean-Michel Cousteau due to their remarkably preserved state and proximity.

== See also ==
- List of shipwrecks in the Thunder Bay National Marine Sanctuary
- Defiance (schooner)
