= Mudge Island =

Island in British Columbia, Canada

Coordinates: 49°08′N 123°47′W

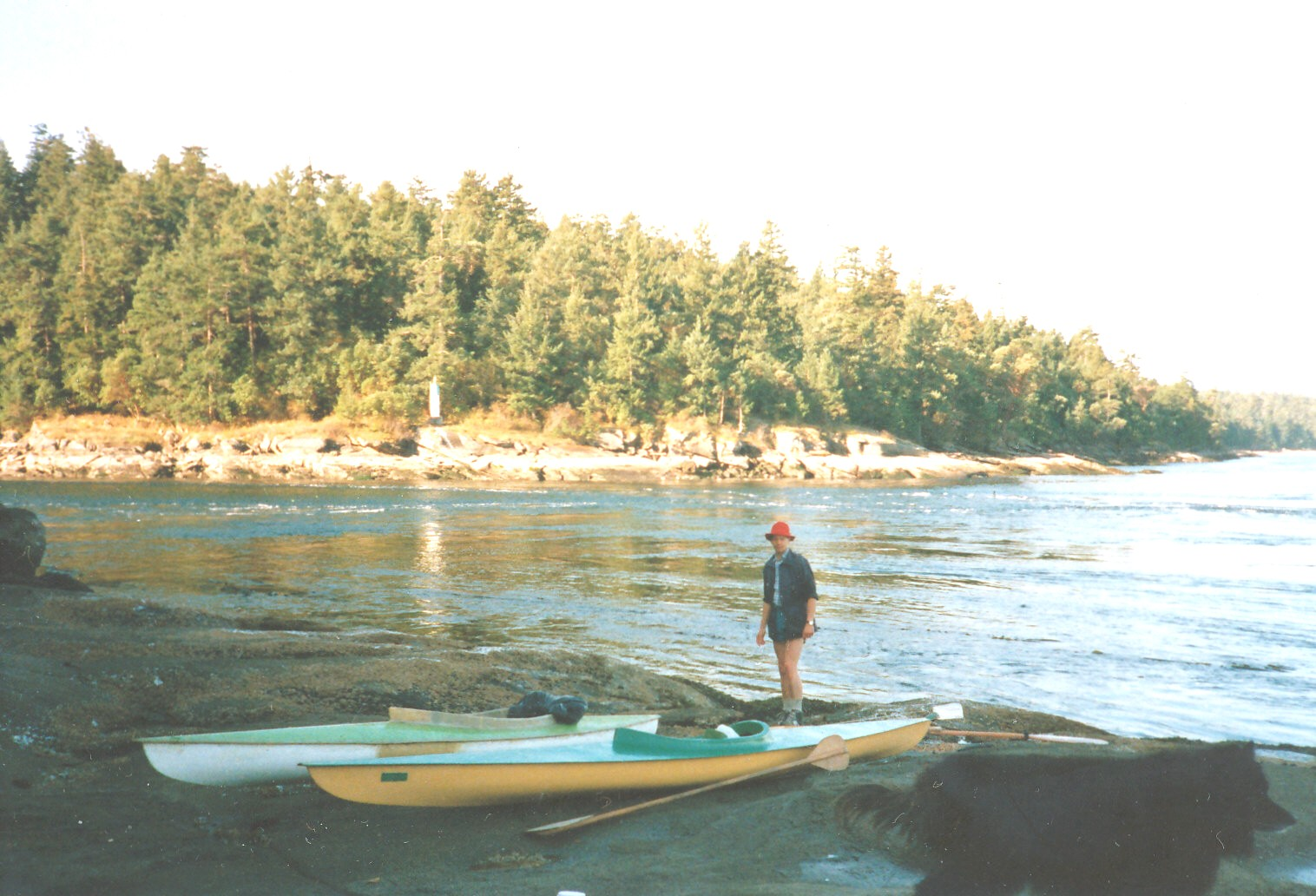
Mudge Island

Mudge Island is one of the Southern Gulf Islands in the Strait of Georgia, in British Columbia (BC), Canada. It lies between Gabriola Island and Vancouver Island, and is considered part of the De Courcy group of islands. It is about 0.8 km (0.50 mi) wide and 4 km (2.5 mi) long. Dodd Narrows separates Mudge Island from Vancouver Island and False Narrows separates it from Gabriola Island. The northern tip of the island is the southern limit of the Port of Nanaimo and the southern most point of Northumberland Channel. Stuart Channel is south of Mudge Island.

The island is named for William Fitzwilliam Mudge, an officer on HMS Plumper under Captain George Henry Richards. Richards surveyed and named many of the islands and other features in the area in 1859.

The island has approximately 140 year-round residents and a summer population of over 200. There is no bridge or ferry service to Mudge Island, but there is a private marina called Moonshine Cove. The island's development is entirely residential, although some residents run businesses out of their homes.

There are several dirt roads connecting the residences. The island has Electricity provided by BC Hydro, telephone, cable television service, and Fiber Optic Internet, unique among the smaller De Courcy Islands.
