= Defiance (schooner) =

Shipwreck in Lake Huron, Michigan, United States

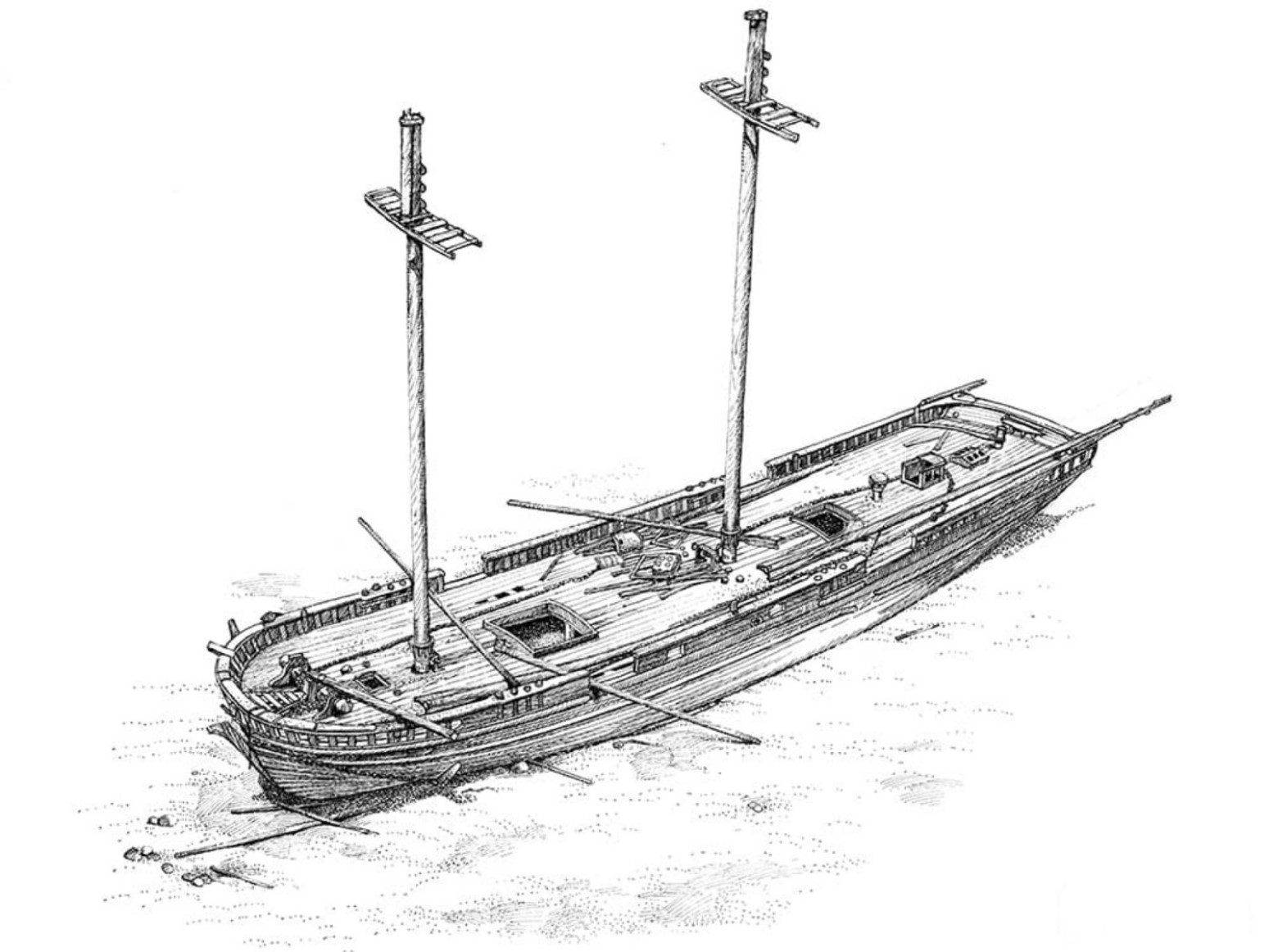
- Image of the Defiance shipwreck

History

United States
- Name: Defiance
- Builder: Captain Roby
- Launched: 1848
- Completed: 1848
- In service: 1848
- Out of service: 1854
- Fate: Wrecked in Lake Huron October 21, 1854

General characteristics
- Type: Wooden two-masted schooner
- Tonnage: 253 GRT
- Length: 115 ft (35 m)
- Beam: 26 ft (7.9 m)

Defiance was a wooden two-masted schooner built in 1848 at Perrysburg, Ohio, by Captain Roby. She was a grain-hauling vessel that met her fate on October 21, 1854, in a fatal collision with the brig John J. Audubon off Presque Isle in Lake Huron. Defiance sank shortly after the collision, but all crew survived. The wreck now lies upright and well preserved at a depth of 185 feet (56 m) in the Thunder Bay National Marine Sanctuary.

== Description ==
Defiance was a relatively small cargo schooner for her time, measuring 115 feet (35 m) in length with a beam of 26 feet (7.9 m) and a gross register tonnage of 253 tons. She was built in 1848 at Perrysburg, Ohio, and featured a bluff "apple cheeked" bow typical of early Great Lakes schooners. Her primary cargoes included grain commodities such as corn and wheat.

== History ==
For six years, Defiance served as a merchant schooner on the Great Lakes, transporting agricultural products across the region. The early 1850s were marked by fierce competition and a relentless push for speed in commercial shipping, which often led to risky navigation practices. The year 1854 was particularly deadly, with 70 ships lost, 119 lives claimed, and over $2 million in property losses. Both Defiance and John J. Audubon were victims of this dangerous period.

== Sinking ==
In the early morning hours of October 21, 1854, Defiance was sailing south through dense fog on Lake Huron en route to Buffalo, New York. At approximately 1:30 a.m., she collided with the northbound brig John J. Audubon, which was carrying a cargo of iron railroad tracks to Chicago. Defiance struck John J. Audubon amidships, critically damaging both vessels. While John J. Audubon sank rapidly at the site of the collision, Defiance stayed afloat a short time longer before sinking a few miles away. Both crews survived and were able to escape in lifeboats.

== The wreck ==
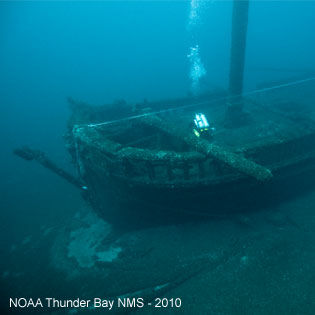
The bow of the wreck

The wreck of Defiance rests upright and mostly intact in 185 feet (56 m) of cold freshwater at coordinates 45°14.058′N 83°16.707′W. Both of her masts remain standing, and her hull shows minimal damage, offering divers a vivid view into mid-19th-century ship construction. The wreck is considered an exceptionally well-preserved example of a wooden schooner and is a notable attraction within the Thunder Bay National Marine Sanctuary. The wreck has been documented extensively through photomosaic imaging, side-scan sonar, and underwater archaeology by institutions including those led by Dr. Robert Ballard and Jean-Michel Cousteau.

== See also ==
- List of shipwrecks in the Thunder Bay National Marine Sanctuary
- John J. Audubon (brig)
