= HMS Highflyer (1851) =

Frigate of the Royal Navy

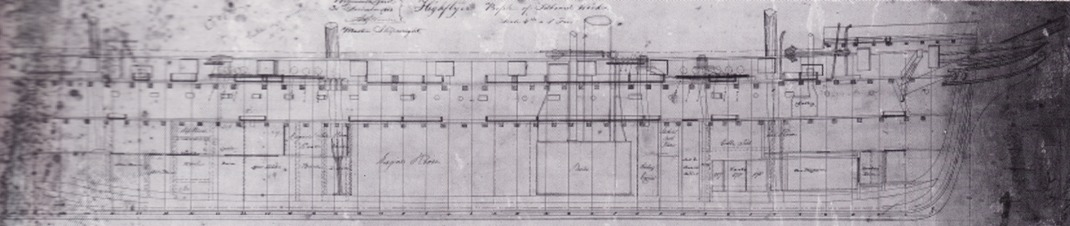
- Profile of Highflyer dated 1863

History

United Kingdom
- Name: HMS Highflyer
- Ordered: 25 April 1847
- Builder: C J Mare & Co., Leamouth Wharf
- Cost: £56,075
- Laid down: January 1850
- Launched: 13 August 1851
- Commissioned: 10 April 1852
- Fate: Broken up May 1871, at Portsmouth

General characteristics
- Class & type: Highflyer-class corvette
- Displacement: 1,737 1/2 tons
- Tons burthen: 1,153 bm
- Length: 192 ft (59 m) oa; 167 ft 3 3/4 in (50.997 m) pp
- Beam: 36 ft 4 in (11.07 m)
- Draught: 15 ft 9 in (4.80 m)
- Depth of hold: 22 ft 8 in (6.91 m)
- Installed power: 702 ihp (523 kW)
- Propulsion: 2-cylinder horizontal single-expansion steam engine; Single screw
- Sail plan: Full-rigged ship
- Speed: 9.4 kn (17.4 km/h) under steam
- Armament: As built: 21 guns: 1 × 10-inch/84-pdr (85cwt) gun; 20 × 32-pounder (42cwt) long guns; Later: 1 × 10-inch/84-pdr (85cwt) gun; 18 × 8-inch guns

HMS Highflyer was a 21-gun wooden screw frigate (later re-designated a corvette) of the Royal Navy. She was built on the River Thames by C J Mare and launched on 13 August 1851. She spent twenty years in service, including action in the Crimean War and the Second Opium War, before being broken up at Portsmouth in May 1871.

== Design ==
Highflyer was ordered as a small wooden frigate to a design by the Surveyor's Department of the Admiralty on 25 April 1847; she and her sister Esk were re-designated as corvettes in 1854. In common with other screw corvettes of the time, she was envisaged as a steam auxiliary, intended to cruise under sail with the steam engine available for assistance. Commensurately she was provided with a full square sailing rig. Her geared two-cylinder horizontal single-expansion steam engine, provided by Maudslay, Sons & Field, developed 702 indicated horsepower (523 kW) and drove a single screw.

== Construction ==
The design was approved in November 1849, and she was laid down in January 1850 in the Leamouth Wharf yard of C J Mare & Co. on the River Thames. She was launched on 18 August 1851 and commissioned at Woolwich on 15 March 1852 under Captain Henry James Matson. The cost of building came to £27,105 for the hull, £17,431 for the machinery and £11,539 for fitting out.

== Service history ==
After commissioning, Highflyer completed fitting out on 10 April 1852. Initially she served on the North America and West Indies Station; her first commander, Captain Matson, died on 14 December 1852, and she was then placed under the command of Captain Edmund Heathcote.

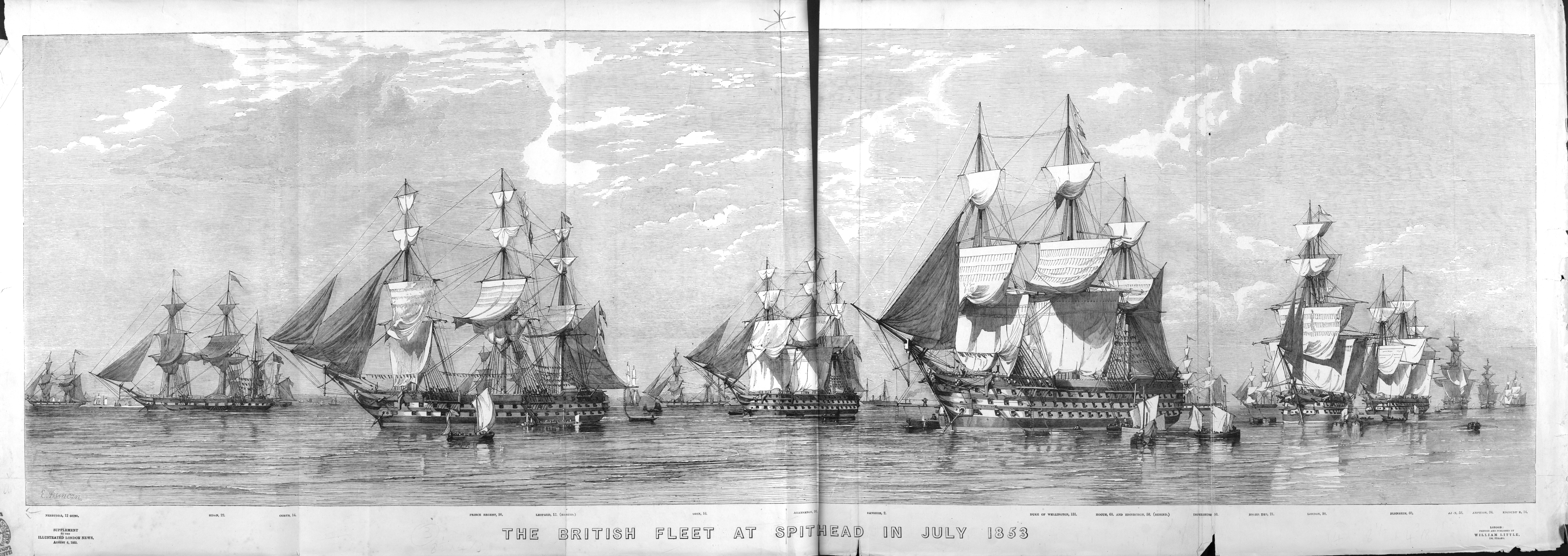
Highflyer at the Spithead Fleet Review on 15 July 1853

On 1 April 1853 command passed to Captain John Moore, under whom she sailed to join the Mediterranean Fleet after taking part in the 1853 Naval Review as part of the starboard division,. She was deployed in 1854 to the Black Sea during the Crimean War.

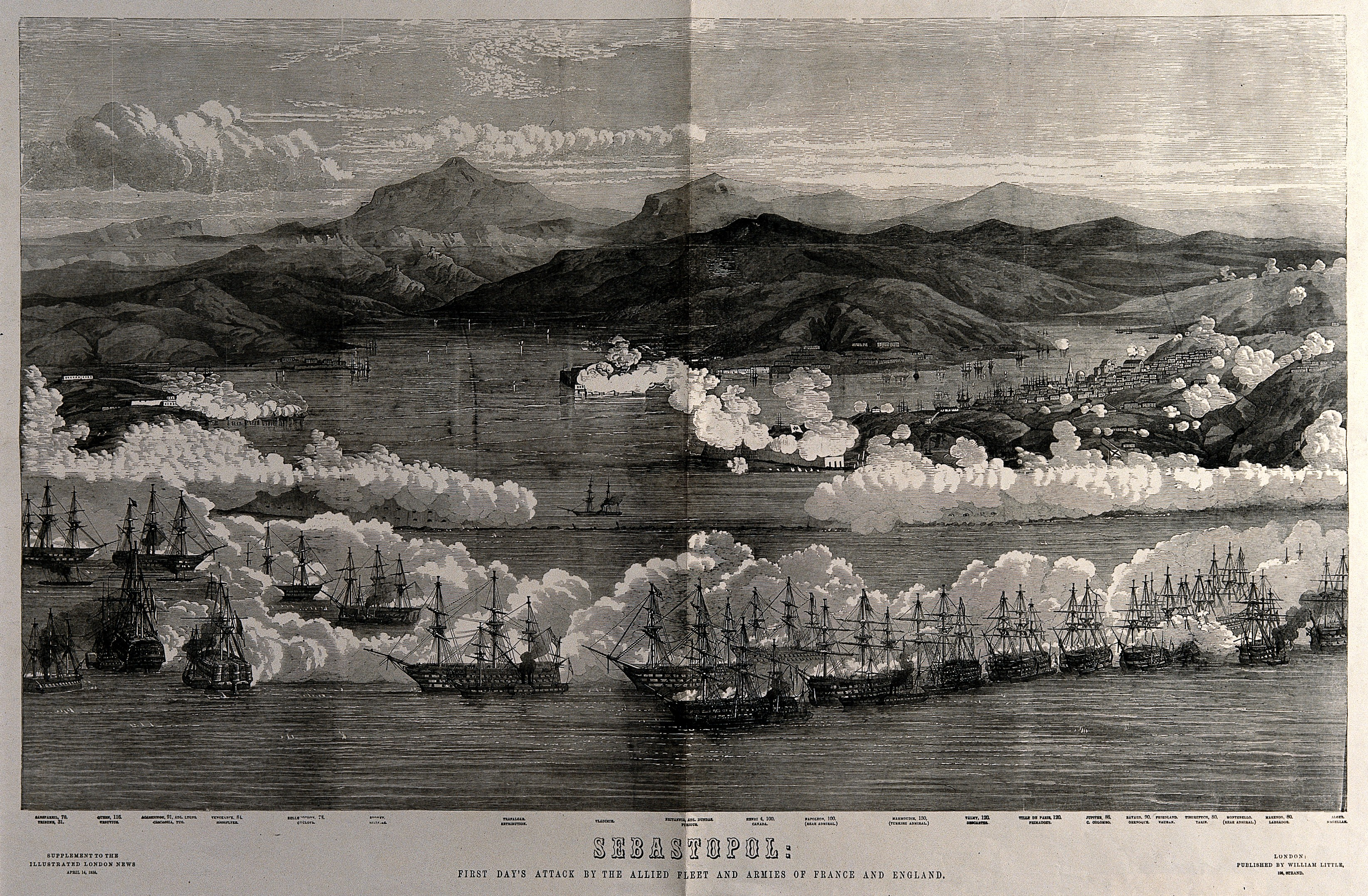
Highflyer at Sebastopol, during the first day's attack by the allied fleet and armies of France and England on 17 October 1854

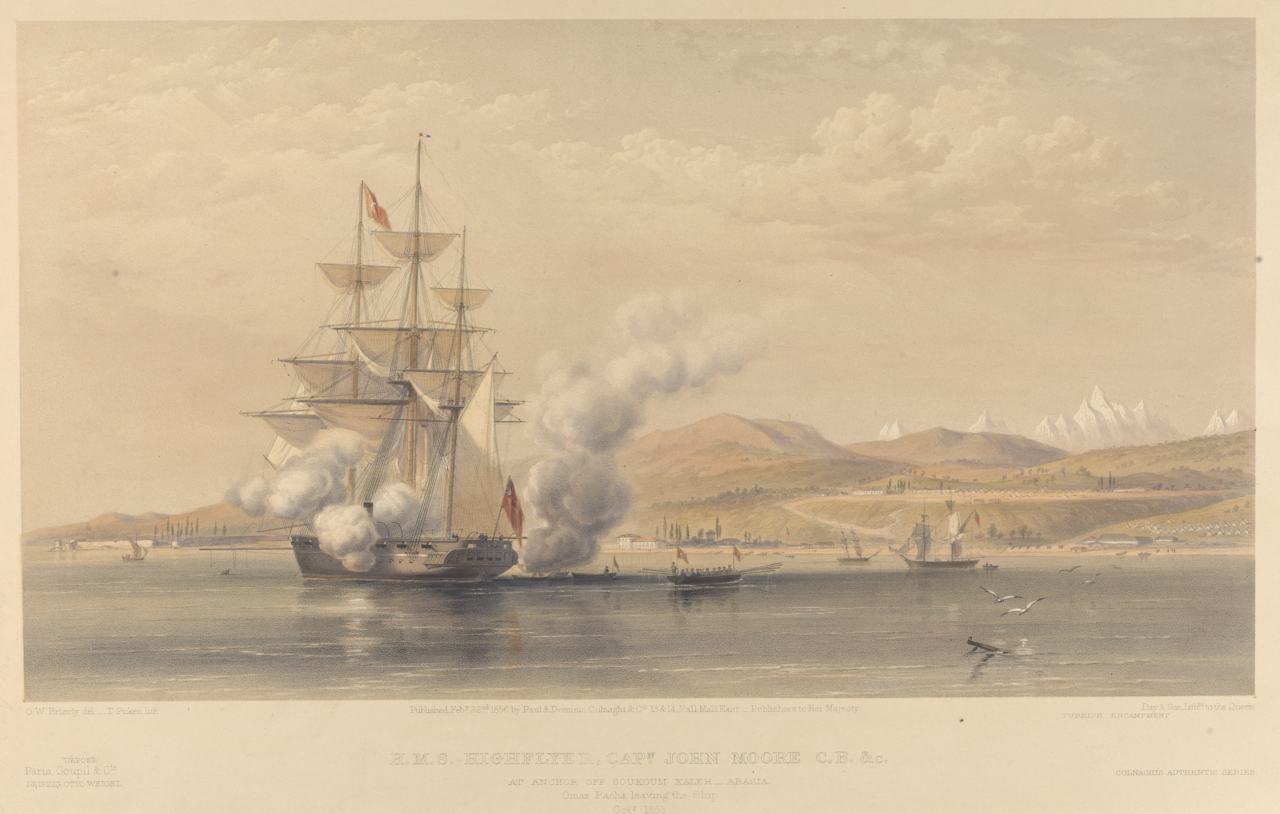
Highflyer at anchor off Soukoum Kaleh, Abasia, Omar Pasha leaving the Ship, October 1855

After recommissioning at Portsmouth under Captain Charles Shadwell on 1 August 1856, she sailed for the China Station, where she took part in the Second Opium War. She was present at the capture of Canton in December 1857 and the Second Battle of Taku Forts on 25 June 1859. Midshipman John Fisher, later Baron Fisher of Kilverstone, served in her during the mid-1850s. Captain William Andrew James Heath took over command from Captain Shadwell on 2 January 1860, still in the Far East.

Highflyer paid off at Portsmouth on 31 May 1861, but recommissioned again on 15 December 1864 under Captain Thomas Malcolm Sabine Pasley, for the Cape of Good Hope and East Indies Stations.

Highflyer also saw service in the Persian Gulf - in January 1866, she bombarded and destroyed the fort at Al Zorah in Ajman constructed by Sheikh Khalid bin Sultan Al Qasimi, the ruler of Sharjah, with Saudi backing.

She paid off for the last time on 31 August 1868 and was broken up at Portsmouth in May 1871.
