= HMS Cossack (1854) =

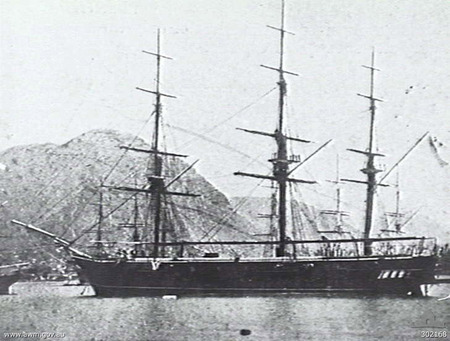
- HMS Cossack

History

Russia
- Name: Witjas (Russian: Витязь)
- Namesake: Cossack (UK)
- Fate: Seized while under construction in 1854

United Kingdom
- Name: HMS Cossack
- Builder: W. & H. Pitcher, Northfleet
- Launched: 15 May 1854
- Decommissioned: 1875
- Fate: Sold to Castle for breaking in May 1875

General characteristics
- Class & type: Cossack-class corvette
- Displacement: 1,951 long tons (1,982 t)
- Length: 195 ft (59 m)
- Beam: 39 ft (12 m)
- Draught: 9 ft (2.7 m)
- Propulsion: 2-cyl horizontal single-expansion steam engine; Single screw
- Sail plan: Full-rigged ship
- Armament: 20 guns

HMS Cossack was a Cossack-class corvette which was laid down as Witjas for the Imperial Russian Navy. She was seized due to the Crimean War breaking out whilst she was under construction and taken into service with the Royal Navy.

== History ==
HMS Cossack was a wooden 20-gun corvette, built at Northfleet and launched on 15 May 1854. She was originally laid down for the Imperial Russian Navy as the corvette Witjas, however was confiscated during the Crimean War in 1854.

On 28 October 1854, she ran aground on the Draystone Rock, off Sheerness, Kent. Her captain was severely reprimanded at the ensuing court-martial.

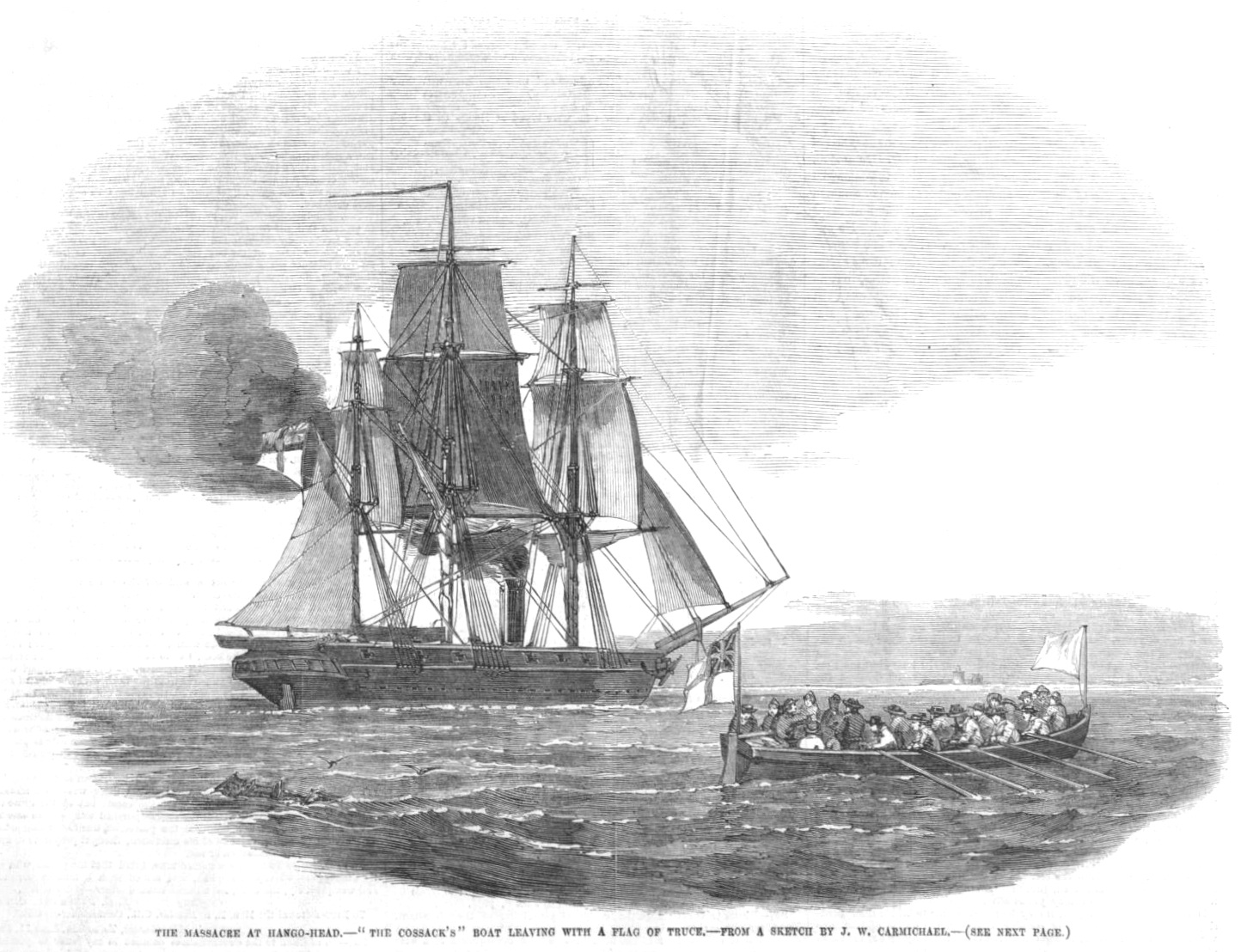
The Cossack's boat under a flag of truce, 5 June 1855 at Hanko Peninsula, returning innocent prisoners, the boat's crew and some of the prisoners were massacred on landfall.

During the Crimean War, four vessels of the Royal Navy— Arrogant, Cossack, Magicienne, and Ruby—silenced the Russian batteries at a fort on Gogland on 21 July 1855. Cossack also participated in the blockade of the Courland coast, in July 1855 helped in the capture Kotka Island and in August was part of the bombardment of Sveaborg.

On 9 January 1861, she ran into the merchant ship John and Henry, severely damaging the starboard side of John and Henry, which Cossack towed into Portsmouth, Hampshire. Her next posting was on Cape of Good Hope Station, she transported Sir George Grey to his posting as Governor of New Zealand in 1861. She was later sent to China Station before joining the Australia Station in September 1871. In June 1872 the new town for Port Walcott on Western Australia's northwest coast was named Cossack to commemorate a visit in December 1871 with the colonial Governor of Western Australia Sir Frederick Weld on board. She left the Australia Station in 1873 and sailed for England.

She was sold to Castle for breaking up at Charlton in May 1875.
