= Brother XII =

British mystic (1878–1934)

Edward Wilson
- Born: Edward Arthur Wilson; July 26, 1878; Birmingham, England, U.K.
- Died: 7 November 1934 (aged 56); Neuchâtel, Switzerland
- Other name: Brother XII
- Years active: 1927-1934
- Known for: Founder and leader of the Cult of Brother XII
- Partner: Mabel Skottowe

Edward Arthur Wilson (25 July 1878 – 7 November 1934), better known as Brother XII, was an English mystic who, in the late 1920s, founded a spiritual community located just south of the city of Nanaimo on Vancouver Island, off the west coast of British Columbia, Canada.

== Early life ==
Wilson was born in Birmingham, England, into a religious family. He later claimed that during his childhood he was visited by angels.

== Career ==
Wilson travelled the world as a mariner, first visiting Canada in 1905. He studied world religions, preparing himself, by his own account, for a destiny that was revealed to him in a vision in the South of France in the autumn of 1924. He soon attracted a devoted following, including a group of wealthy and socially prominent individuals.

Having taken the name Brother XII, he established the Aquarian Foundation in 1927. The group's beliefs were based largely upon the teachings of the Theosophical Society. He published two booklets, The Three Truths and Foundation Letters and Teachings, which explained his ideas and encouraged readers to donate money to his cause and to build homes in the colony, Cedar-by-the-Sea, which he was setting up near Nanaimo on Vancouver Island, British Columbia. With the goal of creating a self-sufficient community independent of the outside world, the Foundation acquired additional property on nearby Valdes and De Courcy Islands, largely through the donations of a wealthy socialite named Mary Connally from Asheville, North Carolina. Other followers gave donations, large and small, to support Brother XII's work as a spiritual teacher, as well as his political activity in support of a Democratic Senator from Alabama, James Thomas Heflin, who ultimately supported Herbert Hoover but was for a while a third-party candidate in the 1928 presidential election in the United States.

An insurrection developed within the ranks of the colony when Brother XII's critics charged that he had claimed to be the reincarnation of the Egyptian god Osiris, though he replied that he had been speaking figuratively, that Osiris and Isis were male and female principles in Nature. Still, Brother XII's misuse of Foundation funds and his extramarital affair with a woman who he claimed was his soul-mate led to the breakup of the colony. The Aquarian Foundation was legally dissolved in 1929, though he continued his work with the followers who had remained loyal to him during the crisis, as well as a number of new recruits.

As time passed, Brother XII became increasingly dictatorial and paranoid, fortifying his island kingdom and reportedly accumulating a fortune in gold. His mistress, Mabel Skottowe, née Rowbotham (under the name "Madame Z"), worked the members without respite, the tasks given being considered tests of their fitness to advance spiritually. One man who had been imprisoned in a cellar on the northern end of Valdes Island managed to row to Nanaimo to report the circumstances to the British Columbia Provincial Police, who investigated, but took no further action. Eventually, as conditions deteriorated, Brother XII's core group of disciples revolted and filed legal actions against him to recover the money they had contributed to his work. In a violent reaction, he destroyed the colony, smashing its buildings and farm equipment, and scuttling his flagship, the sailboat Lady Royal.

Wilson and Skottowe then escaped in their private tugboat, the Kheunaten, rather than appear in court to answer the charges brought by their former disciples. By 1932 they had fled to Europe, and were reported to have taken a large amount of gold with them. Wilson is reported to have died in Neuchâtel, Switzerland, on 7 November 1934, though he may have fabricated his death. He may have subsequently met his lawyer in San Francisco, whose son has provided an eyewitness account of the meeting.
