= List of Michigan State Historic Sites in Alpena County =

Location of Alpena County in Michigan

The following is a list of Michigan State Historic Sites in Alpena County, Michigan. Sites marked with a dagger (†) are also listed on the National Register of Historic Places in Alpena County, Michigan.

== Current listings ==
Name	Image	Location	City	Listing date
Alpena City Hall	Alpena City Hall	208 First Avenue	Alpena	January 17, 2002
Alpena County Courthouse†	Alpena County Courthouse	720 Chisholm Avenue	Alpena	October 23, 1979
Arbeiter Hall	Arbeiter Hall	1224 North Second Avenue	Alpena	July 21, 1988
Joseph Bertrand House	Joseph Bertrand House	725 S Third Avenue	Alpena	February 15, 1990
Jesse Besser House	Jesse Besseer House	232 South First Street	Alpena	July 21, 1988
Daniel Carter Family Commemorative Designation	Daniel Carter Family	211 First Avenue	Alpena	June 20, 1994
First Congregational Church	First Congregational Church	201 Second Avenue	Alpena	July 15, 1999
I.O.O.F. Centennial Building†	I.O.O.F. Centennial Building	150 East Chisholm Street	Alpena	June 15, 1979
Michigan's Cement Industry		Ford Avenue, Roadside Park east of Alpena	Alpena	February 26, 1957
Monarch Milling Company	Monarch Milling Company	633 Campbell Street	Alpena	May 30, 1996
George R. Nicholson House	George R. Nicholson House	422 Washington Avenue	Alpena	October 10, 1989
Saint Bernard Church	Saint Bernard Church	Southeast corner of Fifth and Chisholm streets	Alpena	February 18, 1982
Thunder Bay River, boundary of the Cession of 1819		Roadside Park, Alpena Avenue	Alpena	September 25, 1956

== See also ==
- National Register of Historic Places listings in Alpena County, Michigan

== Sources ==
- Historic Sites Online – Alpena County. Michigan State Housing Developmental Authority. Accessed January 23, 2011.
- City of Alpena (2020). Comprehensive Plan 2020 (PDF). Alpena. pp. 86–88.
