= Long Rapids Township, Michigan =

- Civil township
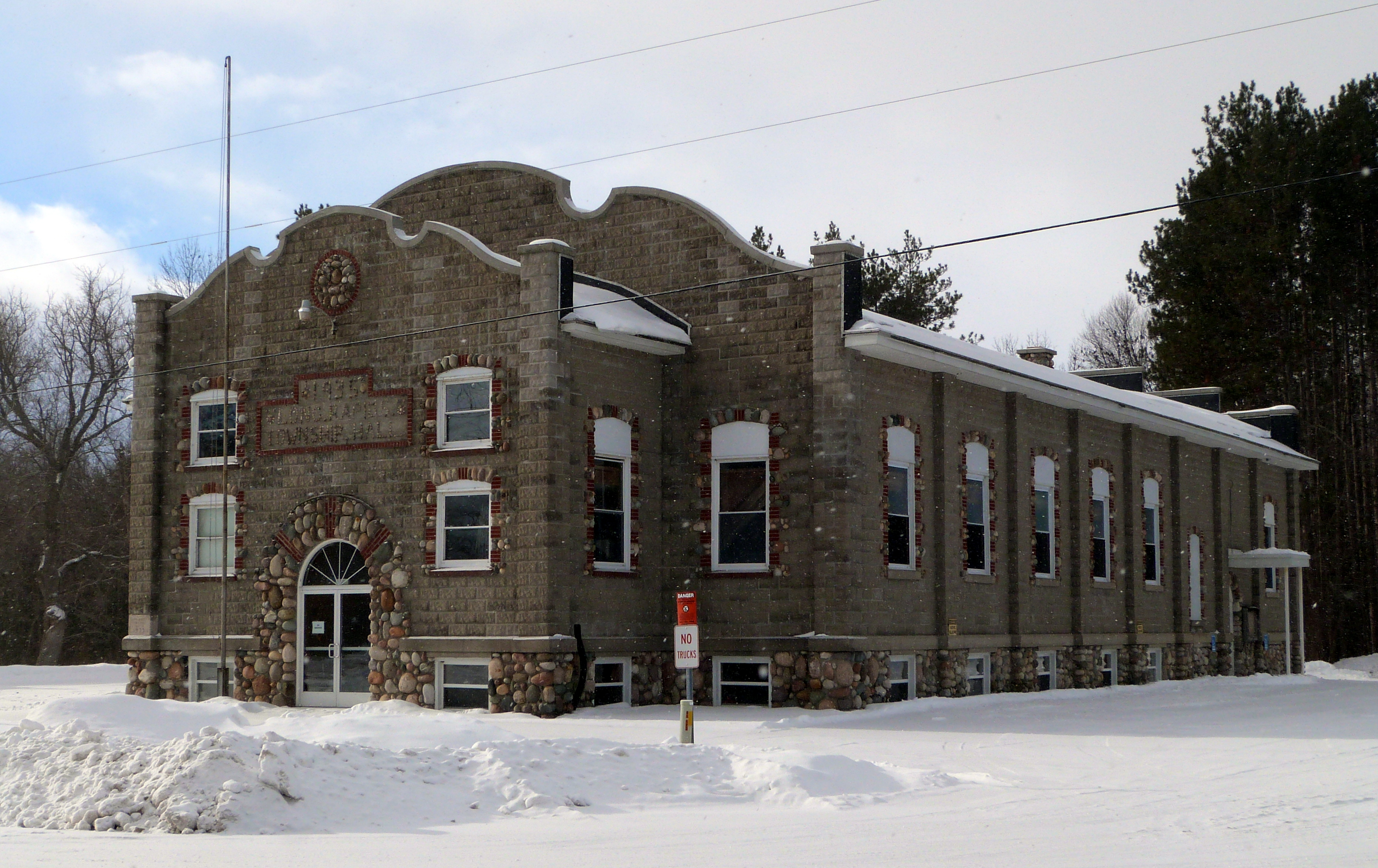
- Long Rapids Township Hall in Lachine

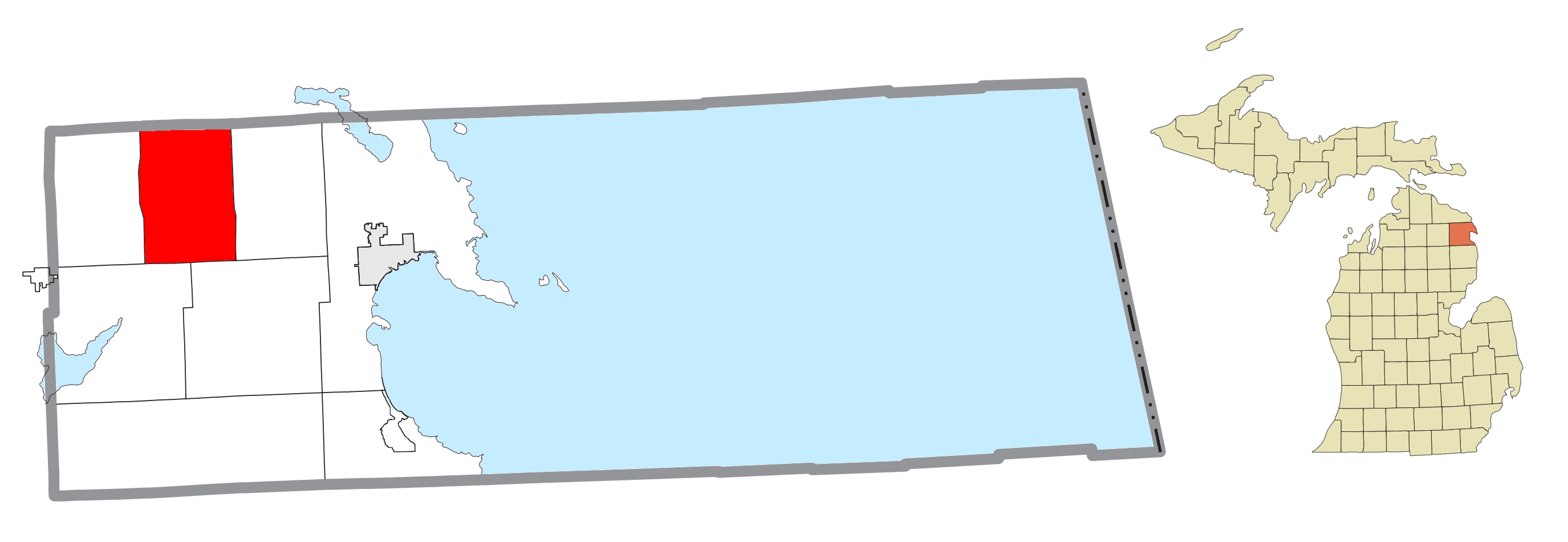
- Location within Alpena County

- Location within the state of Michigan Long Rapids Township (the United States)
- Coordinates: 45°08′03″N 83°42′34″W
- Country: United States
- State: Michigan
- County: Alpena
- Established: 1873

Government
  - Supervisor: Todd Precord
  - Clerk: M. Susan Thomson

Area
  - Total: 54.67 sq mi (141.6 km^{2})
  - Land: 54.19 sq mi (140.4 km^{2})
  - Water: 0.48 sq mi (1.2 km^{2})
- Elevation: 709 ft (216 m)

Population (2020)
  - Total: 977
  - Density: 18.0/sq mi (6.96/km^{2})
- Time zone: UTC-5 (Eastern (EST))
  - Summer (DST): UTC-4 (EDT)
- ZIP code(s): 49744 (Herron); 49753 (Lachine); 49776 (Posen)
- Area code: 989
- FIPS code: 26-49360
- GNIS feature ID: 1626641
- Website: Official website

Long Rapids Township is a civil township of Alpena County in the U.S. state of Michigan. The population was 977 at the 2020 census.

== Communities ==
- Godfrey was the name of a post office here from 1883 until 1912.
- Lachine is an unincorporated community near the southern boundary of the township on M-65 less than a mile north of its junction with M-32 at 45°04′39″N 83°42′58″W It was founded in 1909 as a station on a branch of the Detroit and Mackinac Railway, named by a railroad conductor from Lachine, Quebec, Canada. A post office was established in March 1910. The Lachine ZIP code, 49753, includes most of the southern portion of Long Rapids Township, as well as most of southern Wellington Township to the west and large portions of Wilson Township, Green Township, and Ossineke Township.
- Leer is an unincorporated community near the northern boundary of the township at 45°11′52″N 83°44′22″W The rural settlement was named after Lier, Norway, by the Norwegian immigrants who settled here. A post office operated from March 1901 until April 1910. Leer and the northern portion of Long Rapids Township is served by the Posen ZIP code of 49776.
- Long Rapids is an unincorporated community in the central portion of the township at the junction of M-65 and Long Rapids Road. It is less than a mile north of the main branch of the Thunder Bay River at 45°07′33″N 83°43′21″W with the name coming from the long stretch of rapids in the nearby river. The settlement developed around the sawmill of Albert Merrill and was at first known as "Merrillville". A post office named "Long Rapids" operated from October 1873 until August 1933.

== Geography ==
According to the United States Census Bureau, the township has a total area of 54.67 square miles (141.59 km^{2}), of which 54.19 square miles (140.35 km^{2}) is land and 0.48 square miles (1.24 km^{2}) (0.88%) is water.

== Demographics ==
As of the census of 2000, there were 1,019 people, 404 households, and 300 families residing in the township. The population density was 18.6 inhabitants per square mile (7.2/km^{2}). There were 560 housing units at an average density of 10.2 per square mile (3.9/km^{2}). The racial makeup of the township was 99.31% White, 0.10% African American, 0.29% Native American, 0.10% Asian, 0.10% from other races, and 0.10% from two or more races. Hispanic or Latino of any race were 1.18% of the population.

There were 404 households, out of which 32.4% had children under the age of 18 living with them, 66.1% were married couples living together, 5.7% had a female householder with no husband present, and 25.5% were non-families. 20.0% of all households were made up of individuals, and 11.6% had someone living alone who was 65 years of age or older. The average household size was 2.52 and the average family size was 2.90.

In the township the population was spread out, with 24.5% under the age of 18, 6.8% from 18 to 24, 27.4% from 25 to 44, 25.3% from 45 to 64, and 16.0% who were 65 years of age or older. The median age was 40 years. For every 100 females, there were 98.6 males. For every 100 females age 18 and over, there were 100.8 males.

The median income for a household in the township was $36,083, and the median income for a family was $41,818. Males had a median income of $35,179 versus $20,694 for females. The per capita income for the township was $16,829. About 2.9% of families and 5.0% of the population were below the poverty line, including 2.0% of those under age 18 and 4.5% of those age 65 or over.
