= Alpena Township, Michigan =

- Charter township
- Charter Township of Alpena
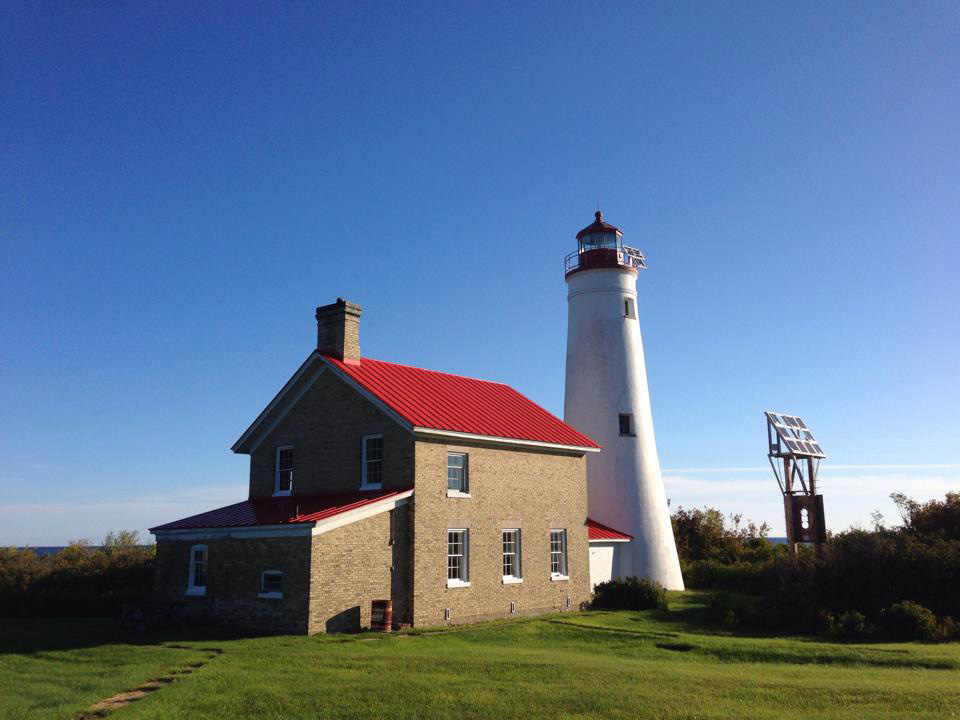
- Thunder Bay Island Light on Thunder Bay Island within Alpena Township

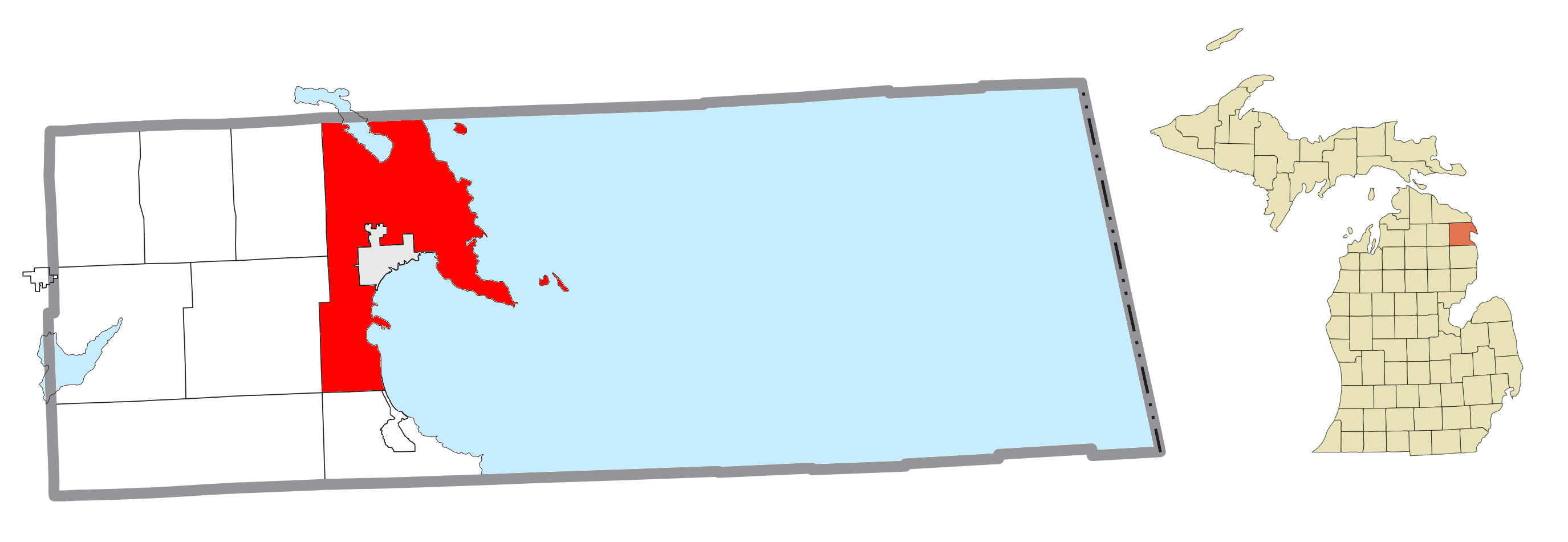
- Location within Alpena County

- Location within the state of Michigan
- Coordinates: 45°05′05″N 83°26′23″W
- Country: United States
- State: Michigan
- County: Alpena
- Established: 1859

Government
  - Supervisor: Nathan Skibbe
  - Clerk: Michele Palevich

Area
  - Total: 141.21 sq mi (365.7 km^{2})
  - Land: 104.45 sq mi (270.5 km^{2})
  - Water: 36.76 sq mi (95.2 km^{2})
- Elevation: 627 ft (191 m)

Population (2020)
  - Total: 9,116
  - Density: 86.7/sq mi (33.5/km^{2})
- Time zone: UTC-5 (Eastern (EST))
  - Summer (DST): UTC-4 (EDT)
- ZIP code(s): 49707 (Alpena); 49766 (Ossineke)
- Area code: 989
- FIPS code: 26-01760
- GNIS feature ID: 1625833
- Website: Official website

Alpena Township, officially the Charter Township of Alpena, is a charter township of Alpena County in the U.S. state of Michigan. As of the 2020 census, the township population was 9,116. The city of Alpena is surrounded by the township, but the two are administered autonomously. Alpena Township is the fourth-largest township by population in Northern Michigan, and the largest outside Grand Traverse County.

== Communities ==
Lakewood is an unincorporated community on US 23 along the northeast side of Long Lake at 45°11′27″N 83°26′02″W. It was founded as a summer resort in about 1912.

== Geography ==
According to the United States Census Bureau, the township has a total area of 141.21 square miles (365.73 km^{2}), of which 104.45 square miles (270.52 km^{2}) is land and 36.76 square miles (95.21 km^{2}) (26.03%) is water, consisting of near-shore waters of Lake Huron, various inland lakes, and a stretch of the Thunder Bay River. Half of Long Lake occupies the northern portion of the township. Off the northeast shore lies Middle Island, which is home to the Middle Island Light, listed on the National Register of Historic Places.

== Demographics ==
As of the census of 2000, there were 9,788 people, 4,037 households, and 2,858 families residing in the township. The population density was 93.2 inhabitants per square mile (36.0/km^{2}). There were 4,757 housing units at an average density of 45.3 per square mile (17.5/km^{2}). The racial makeup of the township was 98.39% White, 0.10% African American, 0.43% Native American, 0.42% Asian, 0.11% from other races, and 0.55% from two or more races. Hispanic or Latino of any race were 0.56% of the population.

There were 4,037 households, out of which 28.9% had children under the age of 18 living with them, 58.8% were married couples living together, 8.2% had a female householder with no husband present, and 29.2% were non-families. 25.0% of all households were made up of individuals, and 11.4% had someone living alone who was 65 years of age or older. The average household size was 2.39 and the average family size was 2.84.

In the township the population was spread out, with 22.6% under the age of 18, 6.9% from 18 to 24, 26.0% from 25 to 44, 27.8% from 45 to 64, and 16.7% who were 65 years of age or older. The median age was 42 years. For every 100 females, there were 93.6 males. For every 100 females age 18 and over, there were 91.7 males.

The median income for a household in the township was $39,889, and the median income for a family was $46,181. Males had a median income of $34,930 versus $22,813 for females. The per capita income for the township was $18,779. About 5.5% of families and 8.2% of the population were below the poverty line, including 9.1% of those under age 18 and 6.7% of those age 65 or over.
