= Alpena County Regional Airport =

Airport in Alpena County, Michigan, United States

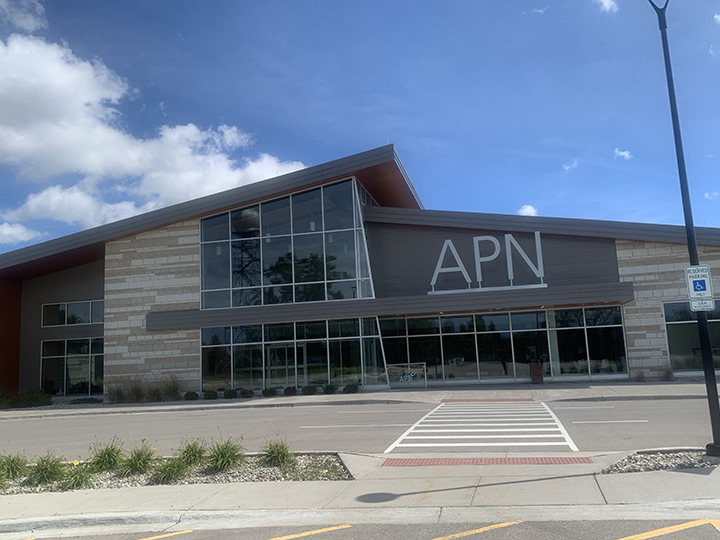
- IATA: APN; ICAO: KAPN; FAA LID: APN

Summary
- Airport type: Public
- Owner: County of Alpena
- Serves: Alpena, Michigan
- Location: Maple Ridge Township/ Wilson Township
- Elevation AMSL: 690 ft (210 m)
- Coordinates: 45°04′41″N 083°33′37″W
- Website: AlpenaAirport.com

Map
- Location of airport in Michigan APN (the United States)

Runways
Direction	Length		Surface
Direction	ft	m	Surface
01/19	9,001	2,744	Concrete
07/25	5,028	1,533	Concrete

Statistics
- Aircraft operations (2021): 5,252
- Based aircraft (2021): 23
- Total passengers served (12 months ending January 2017): 18,400
- Sources: Federal Aviation Administration, Michigan DOT

Alpena County Regional Airport (IATA: APN, ICAO: KAPN, FAA LID: APN) is a county-owned, public-use, joint civil-military airport in Alpena County, Michigan, United States. The airport is located six nautical miles (7 mi, 11 km) west of the central business district of Alpena, off of M-32 . It straddles the boundary between Maple Ridge Township on the north and Wilson Township on the south. It is mostly used for general aviation, but is also served by one commercial airline, an affiliate of Delta Connection, with freight services provided by an affiliate of FedEx Feeder.

It is said to be the "Proud home of Alpena Combat Readiness Training Center," the host unit of the Michigan Air National Guard's Alpena Air National Guard Base.

As per Federal Aviation Administration records, the airport had 7,519 passenger boardings (enplanements) in calendar year 2008, 7,638 enplanements in 2009, and 8,737 in 2010. It is included in the FAA National Plan of Integrated Airport Systems for 2017–2021, in which it is categorized as a non-hub primary commercial service facility.

The airport regularly hosts airshows and aircraft displays of antique aircraft. Aircraft like the B-29 Superfortress and the B-24 Liberator have made stops at the airport for access by the public.

== History ==
Alpena County Regional Airport was founded after World War 1. It was formally dedicated in 1931, and the US Army Air Corps used the airport for training purposes until 1947, at which time it was handed over to Alpena County. The airport has been assigned to the Air National Guard since 1952 and is used for training.

The airport started updates to its passenger terminal in the 1990s. Great Lakes Airlines provided service to Chicago until 1997, when Northwest Airlines began flights to Detroit with regional partner Mesaba Airlines. In 1999, the airport became eligible for Federal Airport Improvement Funds, which currently serve as the primary funding source for airport development. SkyWest Airlines began servicing the airport in 2012 on behalf of Delta Connection.

In 2020, the airport received $17 million as part of the federal CARES act to upgrade facilities and maintain operational levels during the COVID-19 pandemic.

The airport has had increasing passenger numbers throughout its history. In 2021, the airport received a $1 million subsidy from the FAA after passing a 10,000 enplanement threshold that year.

In 2015, the airport was the site of drone test flights in order for the FAA to develop standards for integrating drones into national airspace.

In early 2022, Alpena County and the airport were sued by Huron Aviation, the fuel provider at the airport, over concerns that the airport was trying to break up Huron's business relationship with SkyWest and seize control of the airport's fuel farm, which Huron Aviation claims to have invested in to build. Huron Aviation said Alpena sought quotes from competitors AvFuel and Alpena Ground Services in hopes they would offer lower quotes that the county could offer SkyWest. If SkyWest took a competing offer, Huron says it would have breached its contract with the county, giving the county the right to seize the fuel farm and give it to another provider. The county denies the allegations.

In 2022, SkyWest provided controversy when they cut direct flights at Alpena, instead operating tag flights between Delta hubs via, at different times, Sault Ste. Marie and Pellston. The company had wanted to add flights to Minneapolis as well as Detroit in the summer of 2022, but it failed to sustain the FAA approval to do so.

== Facilities and aircraft ==
Alpena County Regional Airport covers an area of 3,084 acres (1,248 ha) at an elevation of 690 feet (210 m) above mean sea level. It has two runways with concrete surfaces: 1/19 is 9,001 by 150 feet (2,744 × 46 m) and 7/25 is 5,028 by 100 feet (1,533 × 30 m).

For the 12-month period ending August 31, 2021, the airport had 5,252 aircraft operations (down from 9,790 in 2010), or roughly 14 per day: 44% military, 40% general aviation, and 20% air taxi. For the same time period, there were 23 aircraft based at this airport: 23 single-engine and 4 multi-engine airplanes.

The airport has an FBO offering fuel, courtesy cars, a crew lounge, and showers.

== Airlines and destinations ==
=== Passenger ===
Airlines	Destinations
Delta Connection	Detroit

Destinations map
Destinations from Alpena County Regional Airport

=== Cargo ===
Airlines	Destinations
FedEx Feeder	Flint

== Ridership statistics ==
Busiest domestic routes out of APN (September 2023 - August 2024)
Rank	City	Passengers	Carriers
1	Detroit, Michigan	11,000	Delta

== In Media ==
Several scenes of the film Die Hard 2 were shot there. (Note: Bruce Willis and the film crew of Die Hard 2 used Alpena's airport to shoot several scenes of the film. Although the location was selected because snow was expected to be integral to the movie (and was moved from Denver's Stapleton Airport which had no snow), a dearth of precipitation in Alpena necessitated the use of artificial snow.) The location was chosen in part because there was a need for snow, and the producers expected Alpena to produce. However, due to a lack of snowfall, artificial snow had to be used. Consequently, other filming was done at Kincheloe Air Force Base in Michigan's Upper Peninsula.

== Accidents and incidents ==
- On August 12, 1984, a Piper PA-12 was involved in an accident at the airport.
- On March 13, 1986, an Embraer EMB-110P1 Bandeirante operated by Simmons Airlines crashed while attempting an ILS approach in bad weather. The aircraft was attempting a second approach after going around the first time. The probable cause was found to be the flight crew's continued descent below the glideslope and through the published decision height without obtaining visual references of the runway. Contributing to the accident was an insufficient weather dissemination system. Three of the nine occupants were killed.
- On March 13, 2006, a Saab 340B operated by Mesaba Airlines was substantially damaged on the ground before departing from the airport. After the engines were started for a flight to Detroit, it was found a stroller from an inbound passenger had not been offloaded. The pilots shut down the left engine to ease access. The agent retrieving the stroller lost their balance while exiting the aircraft; they dropped the stroller, which was subsequently blown under the fuselage by wind and into the aircraft's right main landing gear before impacting the right engine's propellers, which were spinning. Fragments from the stroller struck the fuselage after passing through the propeller, puncturing three holes and causing dents. The probable cause was found to be the station agent's inability to maintain control of the stroller when he lost his balance while exiting the cargo compartment. A contributing factor was high, gusting winds.

== See also ==
- List of airports in Michigan

== Other sources ==
- Essential Air Service documents (Docket OST-2009-0160) from the U.S. Department of Transportation:
  - Ninety-day notice (July 14, 2009): from Mesaba Aviation, Inc. of its intent to discontinue unsubsidized scheduled air service at the following communities, effective October 12, 2009: Paducah, KY; Alpena, MI; Muskegon, MI; Hancock, MI; Sault Ste. Marie, MI; International Falls, MN; Tupelo, MS and Eau Claire, WI.
- Essential Air Service documents (Docket OST-2009-0300) from the U.S. Department of Transportation:
  - Memorandum (November 19, 2009): closing out docket DOT-2009-0160 and opening up eight new dockets for the various communities (Alpena, MI; Eau Claire, WI; Hancock/Houghton, MI; International Falls, MN; Muskegon, MI; Paducah, KY; Sault Ste. Marie, MI; Tupelo, MS).
  - Order 2010-5-18 (May 13, 2010): setting final past-period subsidy rates for Mesaba Airlines, Inc., d/b/a Delta Connection, for its forced service at Alpena and Sault Ste. Marie, Michigan, International Falls, Minnesota, and Tupelo, Mississippi. Also selecting Mesaba to provide essential air service (EAS) at three of these four communities on a prospective basis. At the fourth community, Tupelo, we are tentatively selecting Mesaba to provide service based on a pro-rata application of the rate Mesaba agreed to which the staff applied to a reduced service level.
  - Ninety Day Notice (July 15, 2011): from MESABA AVIATION, INC. and PINNACLE AIRLINES, INC. of termination of service at Alpena, MI.
  - Order 2011-9-5 (September 13, 2011): prohibiting suspension of service and requesting proposals
  - Order 2012-6-3 (June 6, 2012): extending the Essential Air Service obligation of the two wholly owned subsidiaries of Pinnacle Airlines Corporation—Mesaba Aviation, Inc. and Pinnacle Airlines, d/b/a Delta Connection at the eight communities listed below (Muscle Shoals, AL; Alpena, MI; Iron Mountain/Kingsford, MI; Brainerd, MN; International Falls, MN; Greenville, MS; Laurel/Hattiesburg, MS; Tupelo, MS) for 30 days, through, July 9, 2012.
