= Maple Ridge Township, Michigan =

Maple Ridge Township is the name of some places in the U.S. state of Michigan:

- Maple Ridge Township, Alpena County, Michigan
- Maple Ridge Township, Delta County, Michigan
