= Fletcher Pond =

- Location within the state of Michigan
- Location: Alpena / Montmorency counties, near Hillman, Michigan
- Coordinates: 44°58′58″N 83°50′34″W
- Type: reservoir
- Primary inflows: Thunder Bay River
- Primary outflows: Hydroelectric plant
- Basin countries: United States
- Surface area: 9,000 acres (3,600 ha)
- Shore length^{1}: Privately owned
- Surface elevation: 728 feet (222 m)
- Settlements: near Alpena, Michigan
- ^{1} Shore length is not a well-defined measure.

Fletcher Pond (also called Fletcher Floodwaters) is a man-made body of water located in Northeastern Michigan. The pond covers over 9,000 acres (36 km^{2}) of land that was previously cedar forest. A dam was built in 1931 that blocked the flow of the Thunder Bay River to provide reserve water for the Alpena Power Company hydroelectric power plant located in the city of Alpena, Michigan.

Fletcher Pond has over 13 islands which provide excellent habitat for the various species of marine birds which use the seclusion as a safe place to make nests and rear young. In addition, several stands have been erected in order to provide an acceptable nesting area for Osprey. This has been very conducive to Osprey frequenting the area as the pond has been said to sustain a very large Osprey population.

It is named for George Fletcher, one of the founders of Alpena.

Fletcher pond is a popular destination for fishermen, bird watchers, nature lovers and hunters.
