= Thunder Bay (Michigan) =

- Location within Michigan Location within the United States
- Location: Alpena County, Michigan
- Coordinates: 45°00′00″N 83°24′00″W
- Type: Bay
- Surface elevation: 581 feet (177 m)

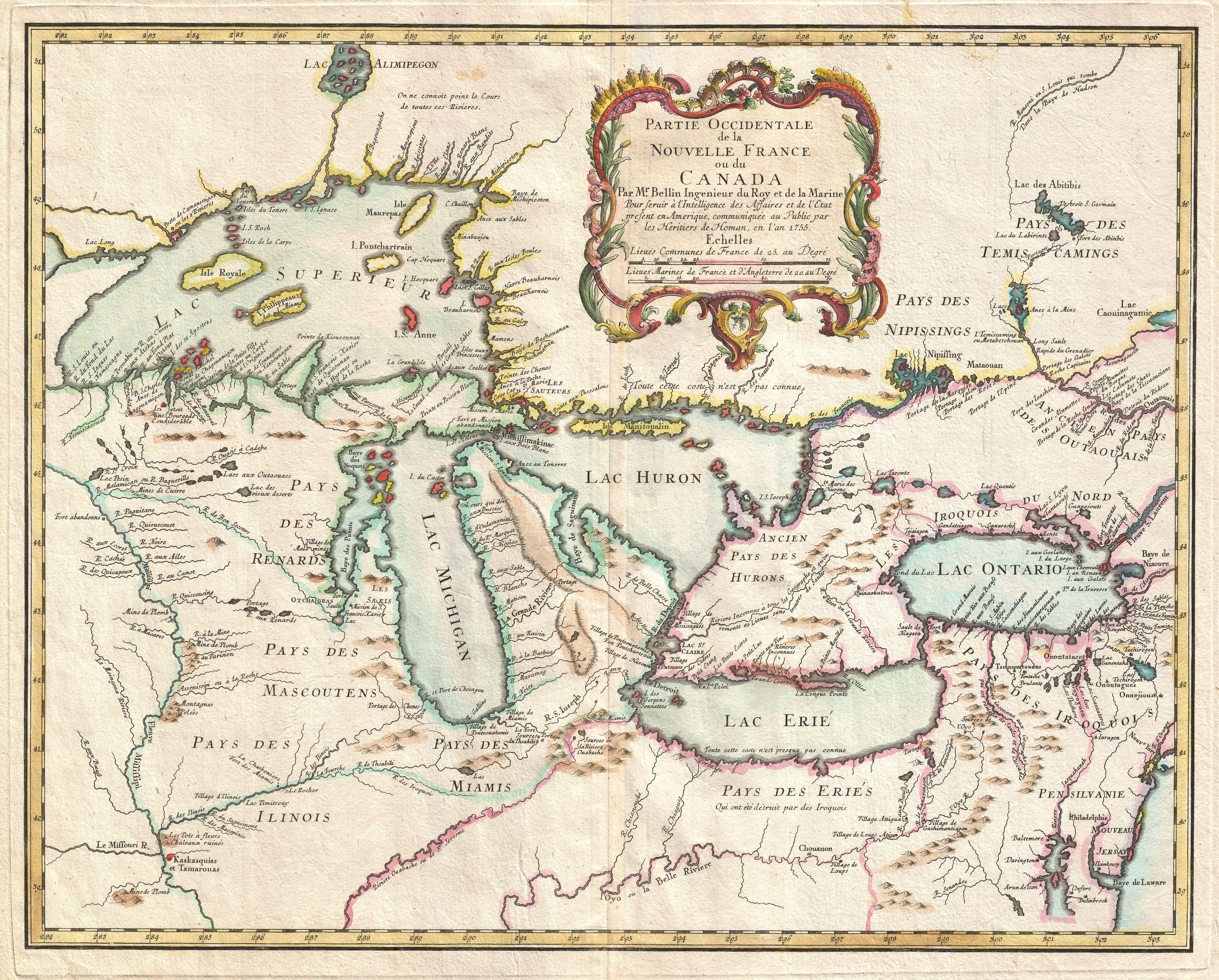
Northern Michigan as shown on a 1755 Map of New France showing various islands, land features, rivers, and settlements. (In French, "I. du Castor" means Beaver Island, "L'ours qui dort" means The Bear That Sleeps, and "ance au tonnerre" means Thunder Bay). The map also shows several rivers that exist today with similar names: Rue Aux Buscies, and Rue d'Oulamanittie, Rue du Pierre Marquet.

Thunder Bay is a bay in the U.S. state of Michigan on Lake Huron. The bay extends from North Point at 45°01′19″N 83°15′58″W to South Point at 44°53′00″N 83°18′51″W.

The city of Alpena lies at the mouth of the Thunder Bay River at 45°03′48″N 83°25′41″W. The entire bay lies within Alpena County, with Alpena Township in the north and Sanborn Township in the south.

Several islands in the bay are protected as part of the Michigan Islands National Wildlife Refuge. Thunder Bay Island lies just east of North Point outside the bay. The wildlife in the Bay's waters are protected as part of the Thunder Bay National Marine Sanctuary.

The name is the English translation of the French Anse du Tonnerre, which appears as early as the map of Franquelin in 1688. It was probably derived from the Native American name, as they believed that the Bay was peculiarly subject to thunder storms. The Thunder Bay Band of Chippewa and Ottawa, who called this bay home, merged with the Mackinac Bands of Chippewa and Ottawa Indians in the mid 1800s under Chief Way-ge-maw-waw-be.

There are a substantial number of shipwrecks in and around Thunder Bay. Diving is an important activity.
