= Wilson Township, Alpena County, Michigan =

Wilson Township, Michigan
- Civil township
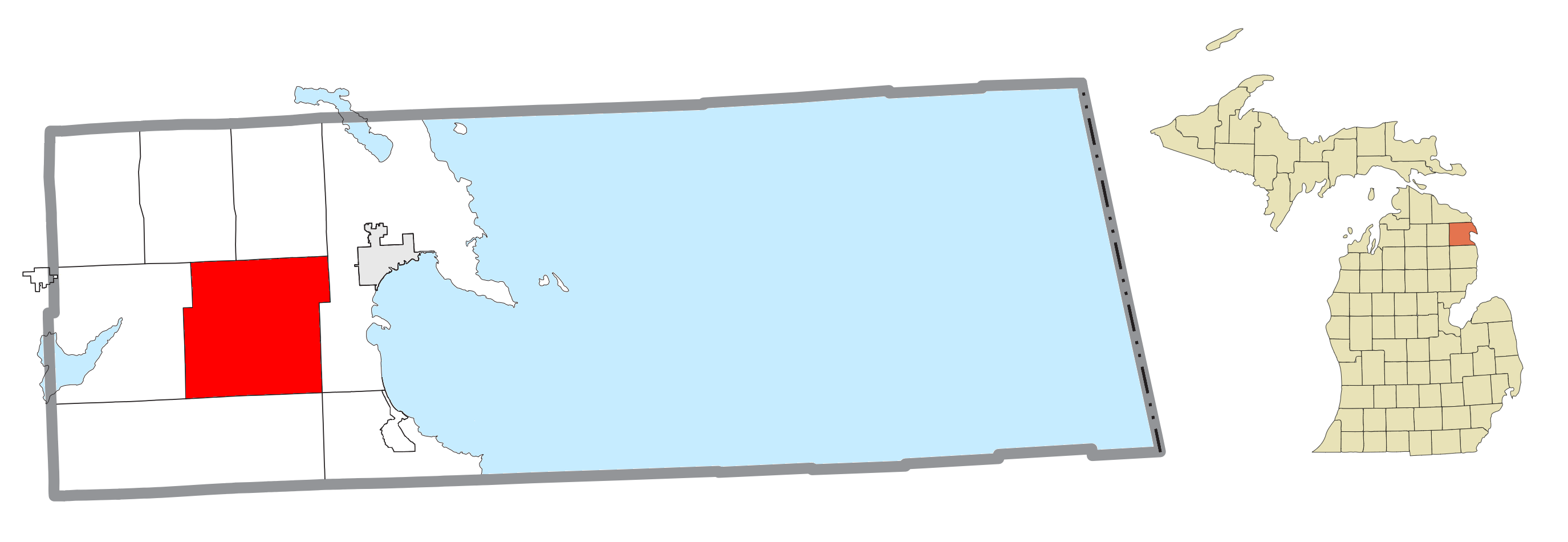
- Location within Alpena County

- Location within the state of Michigan Wilson Township (the United States)
- Coordinates: 45°00′29″N 83°37′12″W
- Country: United States
- State: Michigan
- County: Alpena

Government
  - Supervisor: Daniel Hibner
  - Clerk: Pamela Walker

Area
  - Total: 79.80 sq mi (206.7 km^{2})
  - Land: 79.27 sq mi (205.3 km^{2})
  - Water: 0.53 sq mi (1.4 km^{2})
- Elevation: 728 ft (222 m)

Population (2020)
  - Total: 1,972
  - Density: 24.88/sq mi (9.605/km^{2})
- Time zone: UTC-5 (Eastern (EST))
  - Summer (DST): UTC-4 (EDT)
- ZIP code(s): 49707 (Alpena); 49744 (Herron); 49747 (Hubbard Lake)
- Area code: 989
- FIPS code: 26-87680
- GNIS feature ID: 1627277
- Website: https://wilsontownshipalpena.com/

Wilson Township is a civil township of Alpena County in the U.S. state of Michigan. The population was 1,972 at the 2020 census.

== Communities ==
There are no incorporated municipalities in the township. The city of Alpena is a few miles east of the northeast corner of the township. The Alpena County Regional Airport is partially within the township.

- Dafoe was an unincorporated community centered on a sawmill that also had a station on the Detroit & Mackinaw Railroad.
- Herron is an unincorporated community in the township at 45°01′23″N 83°38′49″W. It was founded in 1920 by Fred Herron and named for him. A post office was established in 1920.

The ZIP Code of 49744 serves most of western Wilson Township as well as small portions of Green Township to the west and Ossineke Township to the south. On October 30, 1952, a gas explosion in a shaft at a gold prospect mine in Herron killed five persons.

== Geography ==
According to the United States Census Bureau, the township has a total area of 79.80 square miles (206.68 km^{2}), of which 79.27 square miles (205.31 km^{2}) is land and 0.53 square miles (1.37 km^{2}) (0.66%) is water.

== Demographics ==
As of the census of 2000, there were 2,074 people, 768 households, and 602 families residing in the township. The population density was 26.1 inhabitants per square mile (10.1/km^{2}). There were 933 housing units at an average density of 11.7 per square mile (4.5/km^{2}). The racial makeup of the township was 98.94% White, 0.29% African American, 0.39% Native American, 0.05% from other races, and 0.34% from two or more races. Hispanic or Latino of any race were 0.43% of the population.

There were 768 households, out of which 35.2% had children under the age of 18 living with them, 68.8% were married couples living together, 6.0% had a female householder with no husband present, and 21.6% were non-families. 18.0% of all households were made up of individuals, and 8.2% had someone living alone who was 65 years of age or older. The average household size was 2.69 and the average family size was 3.05.

In the township the population was spread out, with 26.2% under the age of 18, 7.7% from 18 to 24, 27.7% from 25 to 44, 24.6% from 45 to 64, and 13.7% who were 65 years of age or older. The median age was 39 years. For every 100 females, there were 106.0 males. For every 100 females age 18 and over, there were 104.8 males.

The median income for a household in the township was $37,198, and the median income for a family was $41,719. Males had a median income of $35,208 versus $21,310 for females. The per capita income for the township was $16,758. About 4.1% of families and 5.4% of the population were below the poverty line, including 4.1% of those under age 18 and 4.1% of those age 65 or over.
