= Middle Island Light =

Lighthouse in Michigan, United States

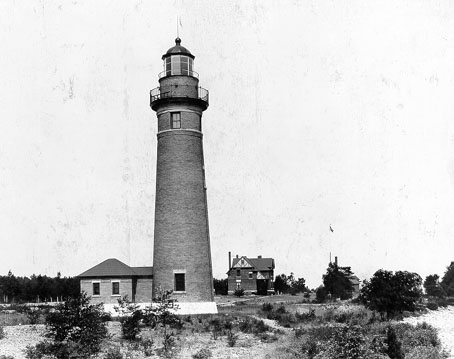
- Location: Middle Island, Alpena, Michigan
- Coordinates: 45°11′35″N 83°19′16″W

Tower
- Constructed: 1905
- Foundation: dressed stone
- Construction: brick
- Automated: 1961
- Height: 71 feet (22 m)
- Shape: conical tower
- Markings: white with horizontal red band
- Heritage: National Register of Historic Places listed place

Light
- First lit: 1905
- Focal height: 78 feet (24 m)
- Lens: red Fourth Order Fresnel lens (original), green Third Order Fresnel lens (current)
- Intensity: 9,000 candlepower
- Range: 14 miles (23 km)
- Characteristic: alternating 5-second periods of light and dark
- Middle Island Light
- U.S. National Register of Historic Places
- Nearest city: Alpena, Michigan
- Area: 2.8 acres (1.1 ha)
- Architect: US Lighthouse Board
- MPS: Light Stations of the United States MPS
- NRHP reference No.: 06000133
- Added to NRHP: March 15, 2006

The Middle Island Light is a lighthouse located on Middle Island in Lake Huron, about 10 miles (16 km) north of Alpena, Michigan. It was listed on the National Register of Historic Places in 2006.

== History ==
Middle Island historically marked an important location for mariners on Lake Huron, being midway on a journey between the north point of Thunder Bay and Presque Isle. The lee side of the island also offered a safe harbor during storms, but the access to the harbor was guarded by shoals. Recognizing the danger of the area, the United States Life-Saving Service constructed a station on the island in 1881. By the 1890s, the need for a lighthouse on the island was apparent, and in 1896, the United States Lighthouse Board requested appropriations to construct one. The request was not acted on until 1902, when Congress appropriated $25,000 for the construction of a light and fog signal on Middle Island, one of the last lights in a string along the Michigan shore of Lake Huron.

Preparations for construction of the light began in 1903, and a contract for construction was awarded in 1904. Construction began in June 1904, and continued through the end of the shipping season. Work resumed at the beginning of the 1905 season, and the completed light was first lit on June 1, 1905. The lighting system used an oil burning lamp and a red fourth-order Fresnel lens. An oil storage shed was constructed the next year.

In 1928, the oil light was changed to a green electrical third-order Fresnel lens; the fog signal was also upgraded. In 1939, the tower was painted white with a horizontal black band, which was changed to red at a later date. The light was automated in 1961; with no staff on site, it was extensively vandalized in the 1960s. In the 1980s, a local group began some restoration, but made little headway.

In 1989, Marvin Theut purchased the keeper's house and fog signal building from the government. In 1992, he formed the Middle Island Lighthouse Keepers Association to restore the property, and in 2001 the group opened the fog signal building as a bed and breakfast. In 2010, the lighthouse itself was declared surplus, and in 2012 it was transferred to the Middle Island Lighthouse Keepers Association. Later that year, members of the Middle Island Lighthouse Keepers Association formed Middle Island Lighthouse Preservation Society, to preserve and restore the lighthouse.

== Description ==
The Middle Island Light consists of three structures: a double keeper's house, a fog signal building, and the light itself. All structures are constructed of brick on a stone foundation. The tower is built 375 feet (114 m) away from the keeper's house, with the fog signal 265 feet (81 m) on the other side of the house. Cement walkways link the three buildings.

The tower stands 70 feet (21 m) to the center of the lantern, and 80 feet (24 m) to its top. It is conical in shape, tapering from 18 feet (5.5 m) diameter at the base to 12 feet 8 inches (3.86 m) diameter at the top.

The keeper's house is a two-story red brick double house, with six rooms in each of its apartments. The fog signal building is a red brick structure with a hip roof. It originally measured 40 feet (12 m) by 23 feet 6 inches (7.16 m); a later addition measuring 6 by 9 feet (1.8 by 2.7 m) was constructed to house a hoisting engine.
