= Thunder Bay Island Light =

Lighthouse in Michigan, United States

Thunder Bay Island
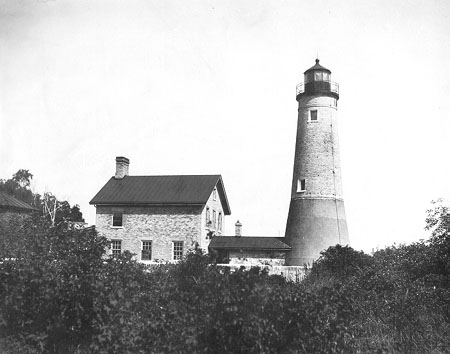
- Thunder Bay Island Light' undated USCG
- Location: Alpena County, Michigan
- Coordinates: 45°02′30″N 83°12′00″W

Tower
- Constructed: 1857 (station established 1831)
- Foundation: Dressed stone and timber
- Construction: Limestone
- Automated: 1983
- Height: 63 feet (19 m)
- Shape: Frustum of a cone with attached keeper's residence
- Markings: White with red lantern
- Heritage: National Register of Historic Places listed place

Light
- First lit: 1857
- Focal height: 63 feet (19 m)
- Lens: Fourth-order Fresnel lens
- Range: 16
- Characteristic: FI G 10s
- Thunder Bay Island Light Station
- U.S. National Register of Historic Places
- Nearest city: Alpena, Michigan
- Area: 2 acres (0.81 ha)
- Built: 1832
- MPS: U.S. Coast Guard Lighthouses and Light Stations on the Great Lakes TR
- NRHP reference No.: 84001371
- Added to NRHP: July 19, 1984

Thunder Bay Island Light, located on Thunder Bay Island's southeast tip, is one of the oldest operating lighthouses in Michigan. The third operating U.S. lighthouse in Lake Huron was built here in 1831, but it disintegrated almost at once and was rebuilt in 1832 of local limestone. This 40-foot (12 m) 1830s light tower was raised 10 feet (3.0 m)) to a height of 50 feet (15 m) in 1857, and sheathed with brick. A fourth order Fresnel lens was installed. This 1857 light tower is the current Thunder Bay Island Light, although the tower has been further altered and is currently 63 feet (19 m) high.

A fog bell was installed in 1858, and the lightkeeper's house was rebuilt in 1868. A steam-powered fog horn was added in 1871, and a fog signal building sheltering the fog signal apparatus was constructed in 1892.

The lighthouse was staffed during the seasons of Great Lakes navigation from 1832 until the staff was replaced by automation in 1983, more than 150 years later.

== Current status ==
The Thunder Bay Island Light was automated in 1983. The lighthouse was added to the National Register of Historic Places on August 19, 1984; however, the lighthouse and adjoining infrastructure resources have deteriorated since automation. In 1997 the United States Coast Guard leased Thunder Bay Island Light to the Thunder Bay Island Preservation Society (TBILPS).

Under TBILPS's guidance, the light has been the object of an intense rescue effort. They have been the subject of a feature article in Lighthouse Digest.

In 2004, Stephen B. Tongue and TBILPS published a book on Thunder Bay Island's history and heritage, with proceeds assigned to the historic preservation of the island.
