= Long Lake (Alpena County, Michigan) =

Lake in the state of Michigan, United States

- Location within Michigan
- Location: Alpena / Presque Isle counties, Michigan, United States
- Coordinates: 45°12′36″N 83°29′00″W
- Lake type: Lake
- Basin countries: United States
- Surface area: 5,652 acres (22.87 km^{2})
- Max. depth: 25 ft (7.6 m)
- Shore length^{1}: 25.3 miles (40.7 km)
- Surface elevation: 650 ft (200 m)
- ^{1} Shore length is not a well-defined measure.

Long Lake is 5,625-acre (22.76 km^{2}) lake in the U.S. state of Michigan. The lake is within two counties Alpena County and Presque Isle County in Northern Michigan. The lake is the 20th largest inland lake in Michigan.

The larger part of the lake is in Alpena Township, Michigan, with the southern shore approximately 7 miles (11 km) from downtown Alpena along U.S. Highway 23, which continues along the eastern side of the lake. In Presque Isle County, the lake extends into Presque Isle Township and Krakow Township.

The lake is adjoined by an Alpena County park (including a day-use beach). Fish species include largemouth bass, smallmouth bass, northern pike, pumpkinseed sunfish, rock bass, yellow perch, walleye, and whitefish.

The name "Long Lake" is common among Michigan's 11,037 inland lakes which cover 1,305 square miles (3,380 km^{2}) of inland water. This should not be confused with the other current and former Long lakes in Michigan, including the one in the vicinity of Long Lake Township, which is near Traverse City on the opposite side of the Lower Peninsula of Michigan.
