= Wellington Township, Michigan =

- Civil township
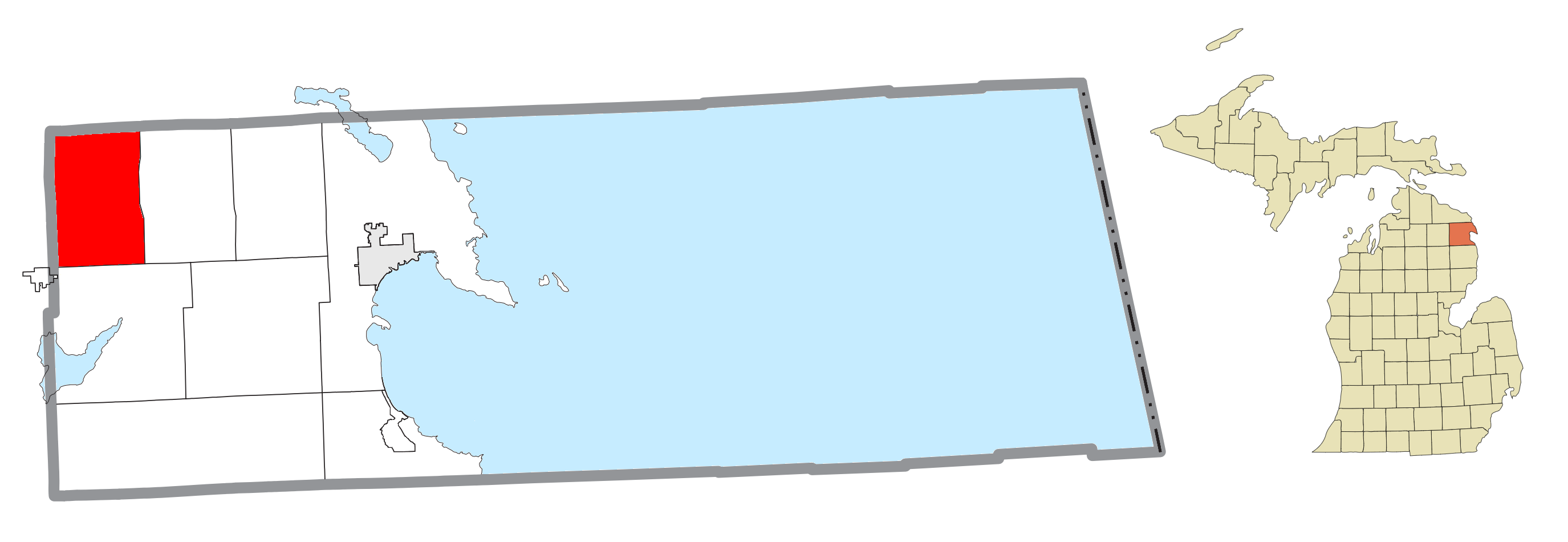
- Location within Alpena County

- Location within the state of Michigan Wellington Township (the United States)
- Coordinates: 45°08′22″N 83°48′33″W
- Country: United States
- State: Michigan
- County: Alpena

Government
  - Supervisor: Ronald Lucas
  - Clerk: Pamela Madsen

Area
  - Total: 53.39 sq mi (138.3 km^{2})
  - Land: 53.22 sq mi (137.8 km^{2})
  - Water: 0.17 sq mi (0.44 km^{2})
- Elevation: 750 ft (230 m)

Population (2020)
  - Total: 250
  - Density: 5.77/sq mi (2.23/km^{2})
- Time zone: UTC-5 (Eastern (EST))
  - Summer (DST): UTC-4 (EDT)
- ZIP code(s): 49743 (Hawks); 49746 (Hillman); 49753 (Lachine); 49776 (Posen)
- Area code: 989
- FIPS code: 26-85180
- GNIS feature ID: 1627240

Wellington Township is a civil township of Alpena County in the U.S. state of Michigan. As of the 2020 census, the township population was 250.

== Geography ==
According to the United States Census Bureau, the township has a total area of 53.39 square miles (138.28 km^{2}), of which 53.22 square miles (137.84 km^{2}) is land and 0.17 square miles (0.44 km^{2}) (0.32%) is water.

== Demographics ==
As of the census of 2000, there were 296 people, 111 households, and 81 families residing in the township. The population density was 5.5 per square mile (2.1/km^{2}). There were 214 housing units at an average density of 4.0 per square mile (1.5/km^{2}). The racial makeup of the township was 97.97% White, 0.34% African American, 0.68% Native American, and 1.01% from two or more races.

There were 111 households, out of which 27.9% had children under the age of 18 living with them, 66.7% were married couples living together, 4.5% had a female householder with no husband present, and 27.0% were non-families. 26.1% of all households were made up of individuals, and 9.0% had someone living alone who was 65 years of age or older. The average household size was 2.60 and the average family size was 3.14.

In the township the population was spread out, with 24.7% under the age of 18, 6.8% from 18 to 24, 26.0% from 25 to 44, 26.0% from 45 to 64, and 16.6% who were 65 years of age or older. The median age was 40 years. For every 100 females, there were 101.4 males. For every 100 females age 18 and over, there were 93.9 males.

The median income for a household in the township was $28,393, and the median income for a family was $34,063. Males had a median income of $39,583 versus $17,143 for females. The per capita income for the township was $13,513. About 10.1% of families and 12.0% of the population were below the poverty line, including 17.3% of those under the age of eighteen and none of those 65 or over.
