= Middle Island (Lake Huron) =

Island in Lake Huron, Michigan, USA

- Location within Michigan Location within the United States

Geography
- Location: Lake Huron
- Coordinates: 45.1925149°N 83.3271950°W
- Highest elevation: 181 m (594 ft)

Administration
- United States
- State: Michigan
- County: Alpena County
- Township: Alpena Township

Middle Island is an island in Lake Huron, located in Alpena Township, Alpena County, Michigan. The island is positioned little over a mile and a half from the community of Lakewood on the mainland. The Middle Island Light, listed on the National Register of Historic Places and built in 1905, lies on the eastern edge of the island. It used to be home to a Life-Saving Station. The light house was automated in 1961, and regular staffing ceased. The island is within the boundaries of the Thunder Bay National Marine Sanctuary. It preserves the lighthouse along with the shipwreck Portsmouth (1867).

The Middle Island Sinkhole is located around 500 feet north of the island at 45.1983°N 83.3278°W. The sinkhole is about 75 feet deep and is available for divers to explore. The sinkhole has been studied by the NOAA Great Lakes Environmental Research Laboratory and various other research groups.

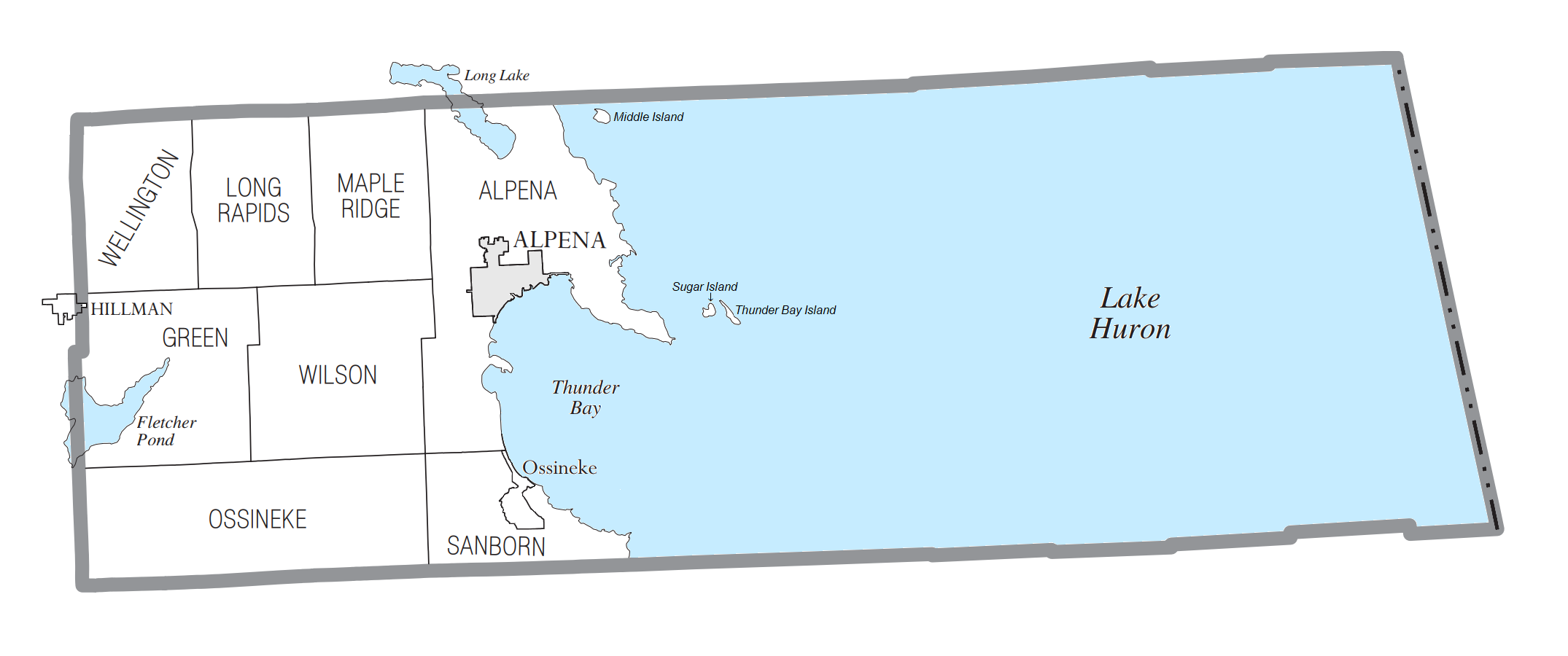
U.S. Census map showing Middle Island near the northern border of Alpena County
