= Alpena County Courthouse =

- U.S. National Register of Historic Places
- Michigan State Historic Site
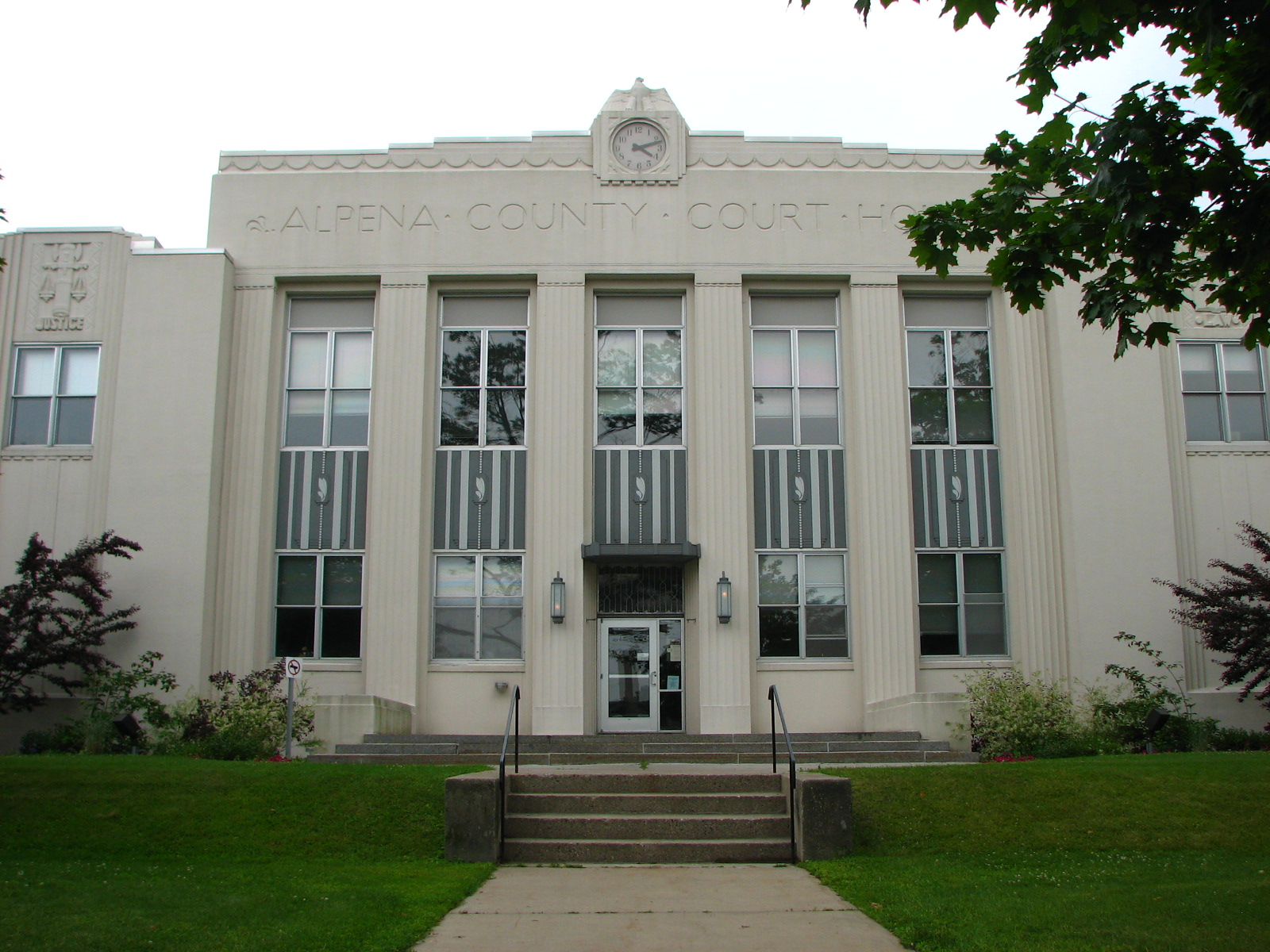

- Location within Michigan Location within the United States
- Interactive map
- Location: 720 W Chisholm Street, Alpena, Michigan
- Coordinates: 45°4′5″N 83°26′30″W
- Area: 4 acres (1.6 ha)
- Built: October 21, 1934
- Architect: William H. Kuni; Henry C. Webber Construction Co.
- NRHP reference No.: 83003643

Significant dates
- Added to NRHP: December 08, 1983
- Designated MSHS: October 23, 1979

Alpena County Courthouses is a historic courthouse in Alpena, Michigan. It houses the circuit court and county clerk, while district court and probate court are housed across the street in the County Annex Building.

== History ==
The first courthouse in Alpena County was located at 150 East Chisholm Street, now the site of the I.O.O.F. Centennial Building. The building was destroyed by a fire on December 12, 1870, and a replacement was built in 1881 at 720 W Chisholm Street. It met a similar fate on November 22, 1932.

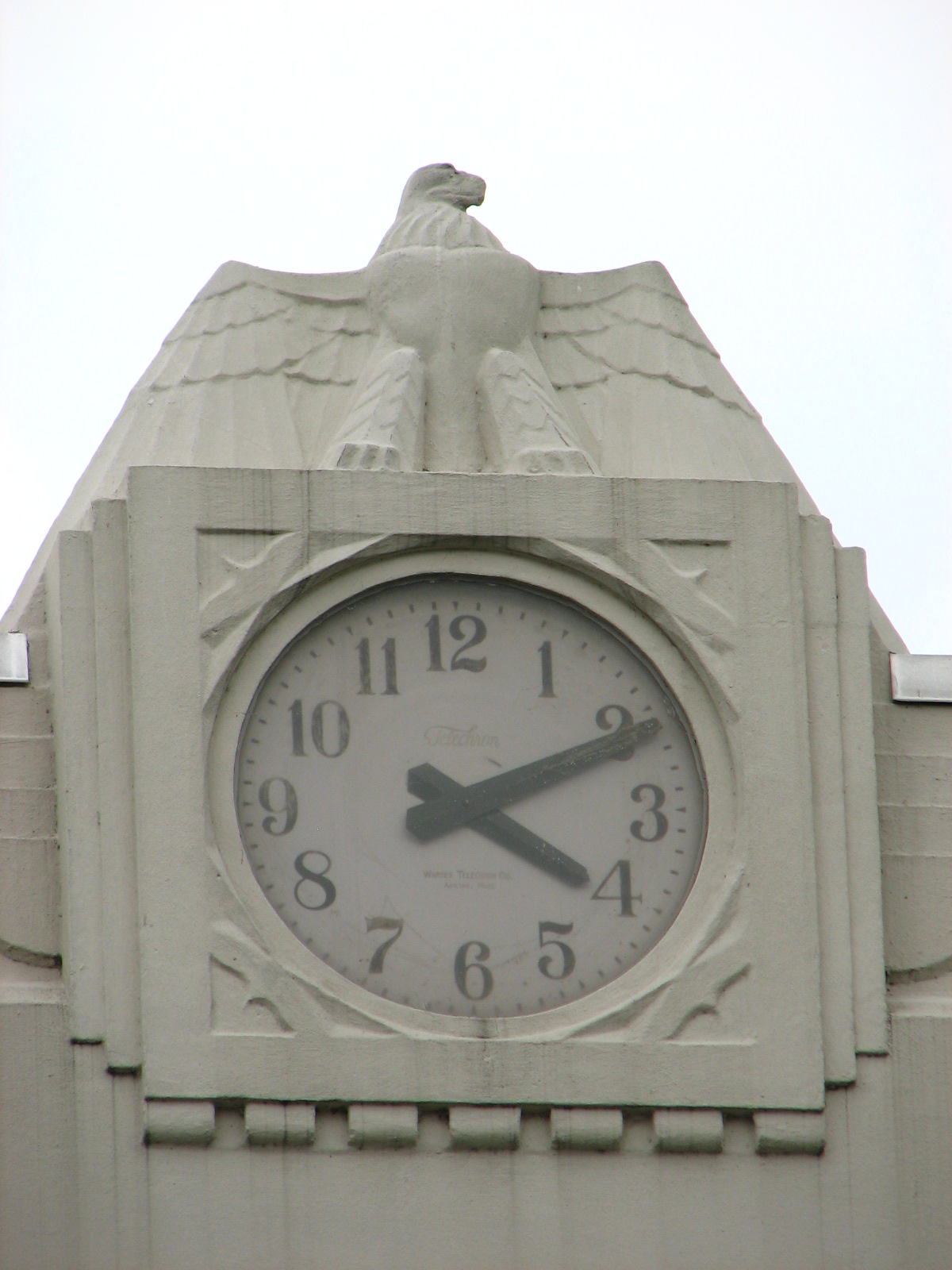
Clocktower

The current courthouse opened October 21, 1934. The building was designed by architect William H. Kuni of Detroit and built by the Henry C. Webber Construction Co. of locally produced poured Portland cement made from locally quarried limestone. According to Kuni, it was the first monolithic poured building constructed during the winter in a cold climate. Kuni also designed the Tuscola County Courthouse.

It was financed partly by local bonds and WPA grants.

The Art Deco building, dubbed "Fort Alpena" by a local writer, is embellished by architectural sculpture, including an eagle perched atop the clock on the main facade and figures of Justice and Law as well as "fascia designs show(ing) images of the county's lumbering, shipbuilding, farming, fishing and recreational industries."

On December 8, 1983, it was added to the National Register of Historic Places, item # 83003643. It is a state registered historic site.

The Alpena County Annex houses the district and probate courts. It is located at 719 Chisholm Avenue and opened in 1997.
