= I.O.O.F. Centennial Building =

- U.S. National Register of Historic Places
- Michigan State Historic Site
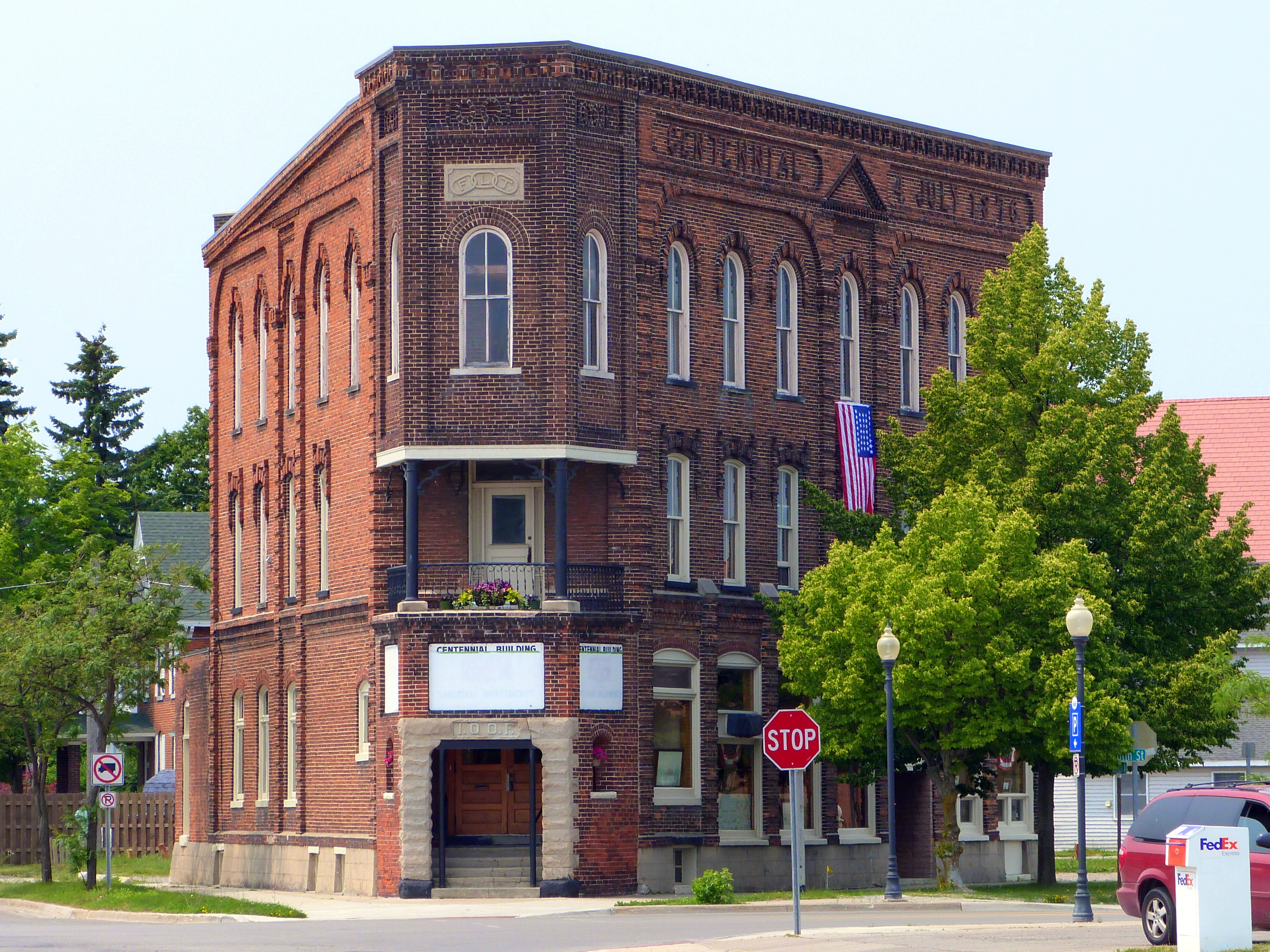

- Location within Michigan Location within the United States
- Interactive map
- Location: 150 E. Chisholm Street; Alpena, Michigan, United States
- Coordinates: 45°03′40″N 83°25′57″W
- Built: 1876; c. 1903 (addition)
- Built by: Fred Ludwig
- Architect: William Mirre
- Architectural style: Late Victorian, Italianate
- NRHP reference No.: 15000944

Significant dates
- Added to NRHP: December 29, 2015
- Designated MSHS: June 15, 1979

The I.O.O.F. Centennial Building is an historic building located at 150 East Chisholm Street in Alpena, Michigan. It was listed on the National Register of Historic Places in 2015. It dates back to 1876 and is “an excellent example of late Victorian commercial architecture.”

== History ==
The site was formerly occupied by the first Alpena County Courthouse, destroyed by a fire on December 12, 1870, and is a designated state historic site. Originally known as the Centennial Block or the Hitchcock Block, the building was constructed in 1876 for Samuel E. Hitchcock and his wife, Samantha Hitchcock, two of the first settlers and most prominent citizens of the city of Alpena. The building changed hands multiple times over the next decades, and is now owned by Mike and Kate Phillips. Following their recent acquisition, they launched their successful effort to have the structure included on the National Register of Historic Places.

In 1901 it was sold to the local chapter of the Independent Order of Odd Fellows (I.O.O.F. Alpena Lodge No. 170) of which Samuel Hitchcock himself was a member. It adopted its designation of the I.O.O.F. Centennial Building from the society. The Odd Fellows has been headquartered in the building's third story since late 1876 and occupied it until 1969, when the fraternity was forced to sell its seat due to declining membership and finances. The building was occupied by several I.O.O.F. lodges: Alpena Lodge No. 170, Myrtle Lodge No. 432 (founded in 1893, and merged with the Alpena Lodge in 1926), Canton Alpena No. 31, Thunder Bay Encampment No. 87, and two Rebekah lodges, Primrose No. 364 and Beulah No. 91 (combined in 1936). The Odd Fellows remained there for 93 years. The building has also housed a variety of professionals, businesses and organizations over the course of its history, including book and music stores, the city library, the Red Ribbon Society (a forerunner of the Woman's Christian Temperance Union), and a restaurant. (Note: The first floor, Phillips said, housed a variety of businesses, including the Music House, which sold musical equipment to early Alpena residents, and bookstore included, among other businesses. Uses have varied over the decades, with everything from a bar, grill and strip club in the location, to law offices, architectural firms and even Alpena office space for state lawmakers, Phillips said.") Elizabeth C. Nason's Centennial Book Store occupied the structure's first floor from 1881 to 1899.

The building has been known by at least seven names: "Hitchcock block" or "Hitchcock's block"; "Centennial building" or "Centennial block;" "Odd Fellows Hall;" "I.O.O.F. Hall;" and "Odd Fellows' Temple."

== Architecture ==
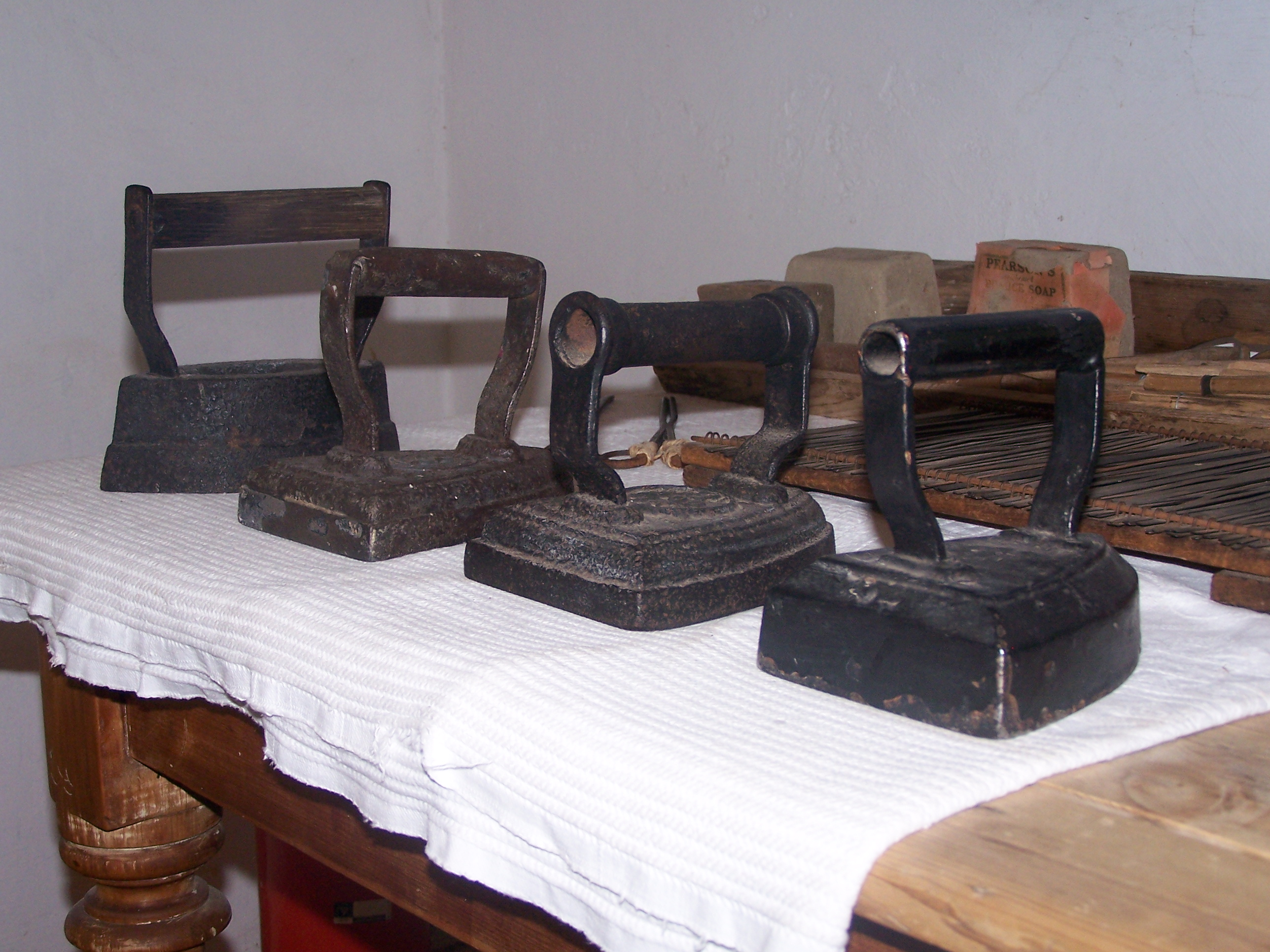
Cast iron flat clothes irons

The I.O.O.F. Centennial Building stands at three floors, with a basement level, and occupies a triangular lot at the intersection of Chisholm Street, West Washington Avenue and First Avenue, within the city's central commercial district. Designed by architect William Mirre (Note: William Mirre (1835–1887) was a German born surveyor who had moved to Detroit in 1868 and who had worked on surveying the Great Lakes before settling in Alpena in 1871. There he served as the Alpena county and city surveyor.) and built by Fred Ludwig, a local bricklayer, it is one of the oldest existing buildings in downtown Alpena, and a good example of Italianate architecture. It is in the form of a flatiron building. As with numerous other wedge-shaped buildings, the phrase "Flatiron" derives from its contour, and specifically its exterior resemblance to a cast iron clothes iron. (Note: "By 1903, Chicago’s Daniel H. Burnham had completed the twenty-one-story Fuller Building in New York City, which the public quickly redubbed the Flatiron Building because of its iconic triangular plan. The Centennial I.O.O.F. Building shares with the Flatiron Building its placement on a seemingly unbuildable tract, and the odd 'prow like' forward face.)

The structure stands on a "coursed ashlar dressed masonry foundation" and is entirely made of brick, as required by the Alpena fire limit ordinance enacted after the blaze of July 12, 1872 (the largest fire in Alpena's history, which destroyed 15 acres of homes and businesses). The original north and south elevations (respectively seven and five bays wide) are divided into three vertical sections, and feature rusticated piers, quoins, and ornamental hood moldings. The north façade, facing Washington Avenue, contains two ground floor storefronts and is crowned by an elaborate frieze, consisting of two long rectangular panels separated by a projecting pediment. The raised brickwork within the panels spell out 'CENTENNIAL' and '4 JULY 1876' that celebrates America's century of independence and the year the building was constructed. (Note: "Summary Paragraph / The IOOF Centennial Building is located near the southwest end of downtown Alpena. It is a red brick, three story, flat iron-shaped building that occupies a triangular lot. The Italianate commercial building has ornamental hood moldings, paneled walls, quoins, and a frieze with raised brickwork spelling out 'Centennial'and '4 July 1876.'")

The building was heavily remodeled by the Odd Fellows in the first decade of the twentieth century. The easternmost bay facing Chisholm Street was added circa 1903 and contains a recessed corner entrance on the first floor, surmounted by an open balcony and by an enclosed brick third story. The protruding addition resembles a prow, and gives the building a distinctive look. The limestone portal that leads to the recessed door features a lintel displaying 'IOOF' in raised letters; the same acronym is displayed in brickwork above the third-story windows, together with a rectangular masonry plaque containing the primary symbol of the Independent Order of Odd Fellows (a three-link chain with the letters F, L and T, referring to the motto "Friendship, Love and Truth"). The third story was designed to blend with the 1876 exterior, but is faced with a darker tint brick.

The I.O.O.F. Centennial Building features unusual architectural highlights, icons and peculiarities that are specially tied to its purpose as home for the lodge and its secret eleemosynary mission: the third-story temple, for instance, can only be reached via an antechamber, so that people who were in need could enter and exit the room without being exposed. Both doors were always guarded, never opened simultaneously, and access was only by secret code twice recognized and acknowledged. Artifacts and furnishings are still present.

The building was not the first constructed using its triangular ground-plan: aside from a possibly unique triangular Roman temple built on a similarly constricted site in the city of Verulamium, Britannia, the Maryland Inn in Annapolis (1782) predates it. (Note: The Phelan Building in San Francisco (1881), the Gooderham Building of Toronto (1892), and the English-American Building in Atlanta (1897) are other examples that followed, but before the iconic New York Flatiron Building.)

== Gallery ==
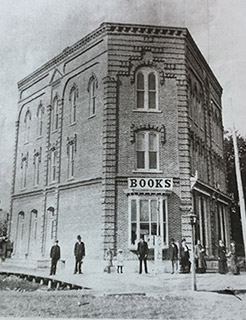
The Centennial Building in 1887

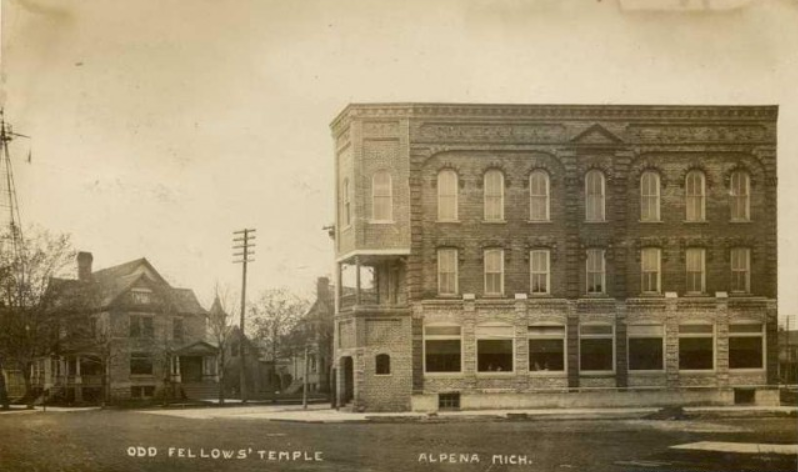
Odd Fellows Temple, circa 1903

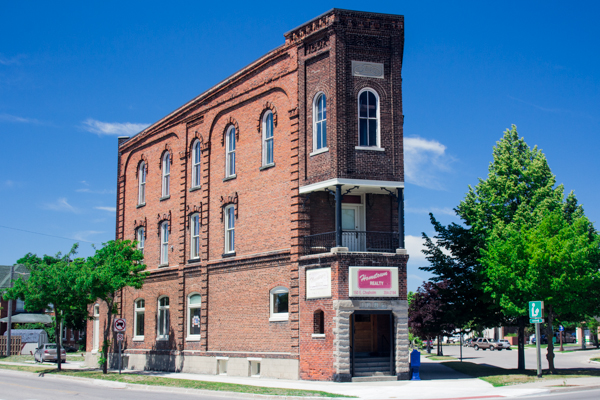
I.O.O.F. Centennial Building in 2014

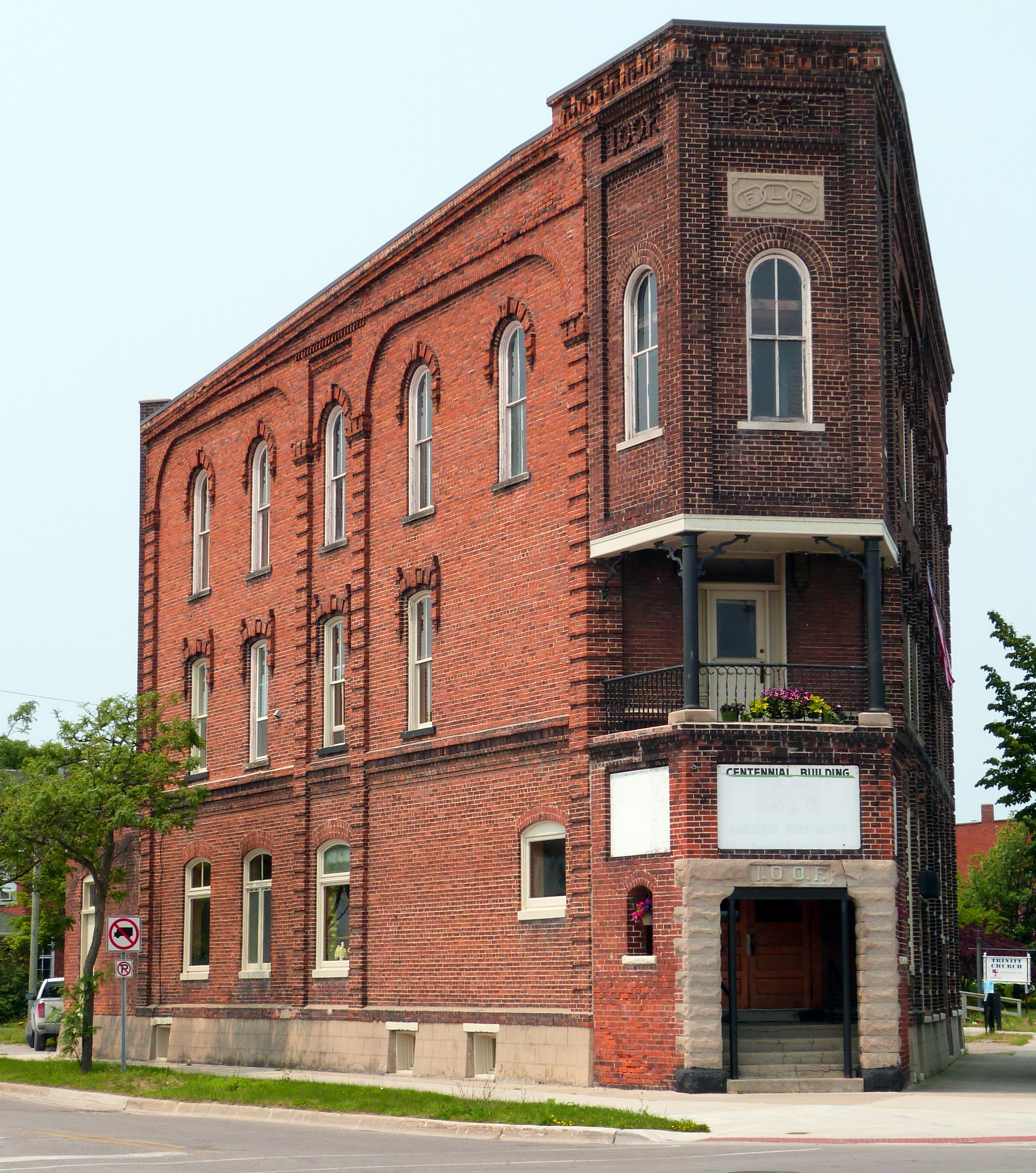
I.O.O.F. Centennial Building in 2015

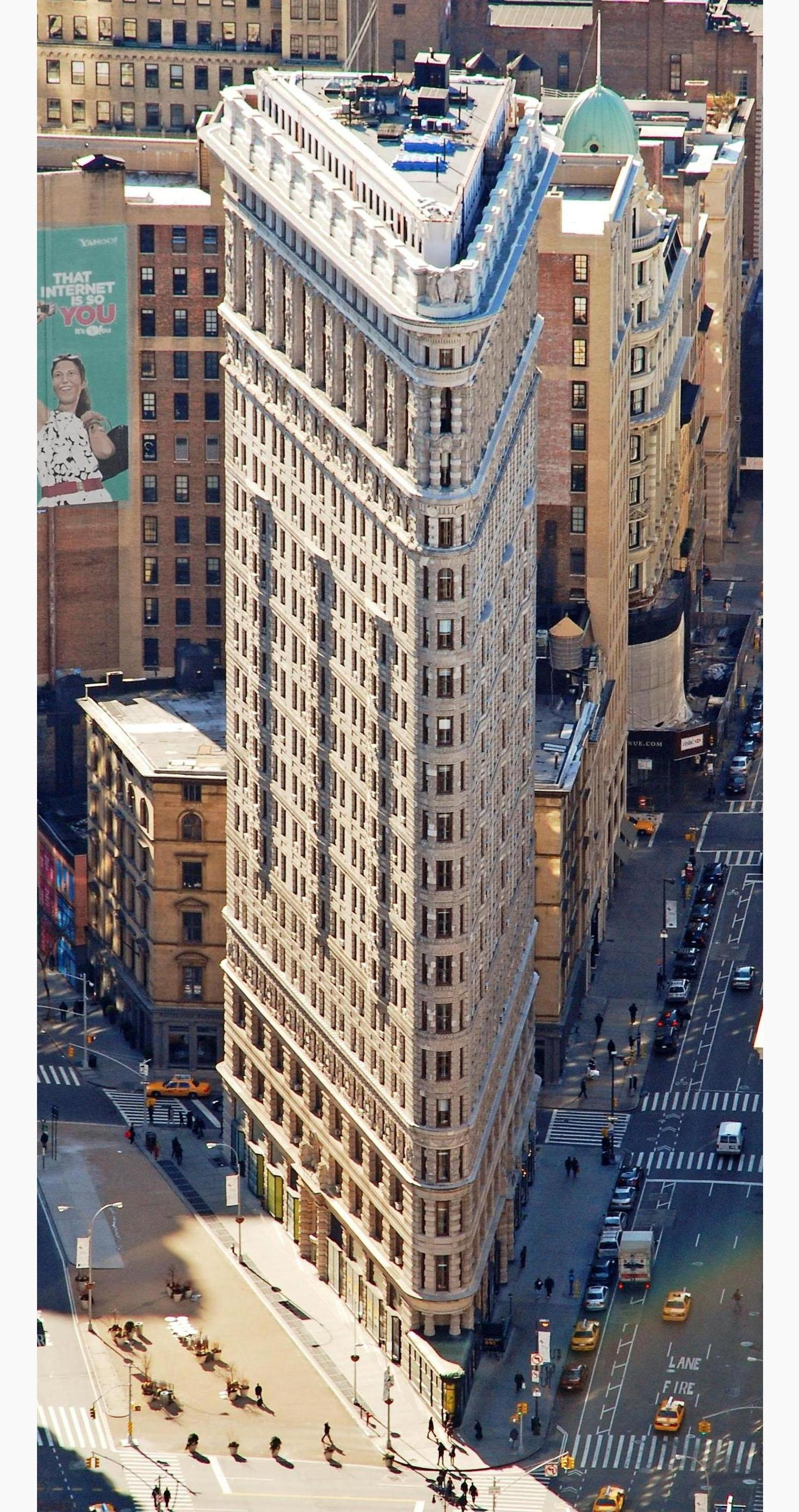
Flatiron Building of New York City
