= Green Township, Michigan =

- Civil township
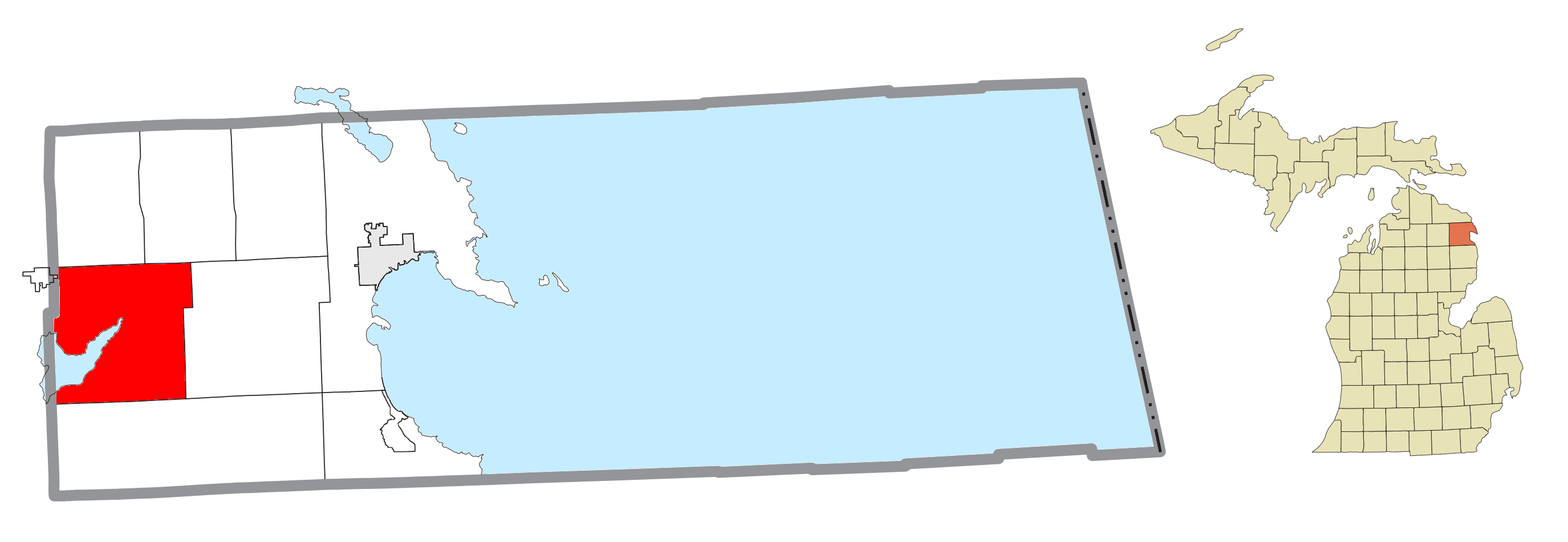
- Location within Alpena County (red) and an administered portion of the Hillman village (pink)

- Location within the state of Michigan Green Township (the United States)
- Coordinates: 45°01′24″N 83°47′10″W
- Country: United States
- State: Michigan
- County: Alpena
- Established: 1881

Government
  - Supervisor: Eric Smith
  - Clerk: Melony Sumerix

Area
  - Total: 80.06 sq mi (207.4 km^{2})
  - Land: 71.04 sq mi (184.0 km^{2})
  - Water: 9.02 sq mi (23.4 km^{2})
- Elevation: 728 ft (222 m)

Population (2020)
  - Total: 1,117
  - Density: 15.72/sq mi (6.071/km^{2})
- Time zone: UTC-5 (Eastern (EST))
  - Summer (DST): UTC-4 (EDT)
- ZIP code(s): 49746 (Hillman); 49753 (Lachine)
- Area code: 989
- FIPS code: 26-34740
- GNIS feature ID: 1626392
- Website: Official website

Green Township is a civil township of Alpena County in the U.S. state of Michigan. The population was 1,117 at the 2020 census.

== Communities ==
- Flanders is an unincorporated community in the northeast corner of the township approximately 15.5 miles (24.9 km) west of downtown Alpena on M-32 at the junction with M-65 at 45°03′36″N 83°44′48″W. Flanders began as settlement around a sawmill in 1869 and was named for local lumber merchant S.W. Flanders. A post office operated here from December 1885 until February 1914.
- Hillman is a village located mostly in neighboring Hillman Township in Montmorency County. While the village encompasses a total area of 1.70 square miles (4.40 km^{2}) and a population of 701, only a very small portion of 0.04 square miles (0.10 km^{2}) and four residents are within Green Township.
- Spratt is an unincorporated community along M-65 approximately 4.5 miles (7.2 km) south of Flanders at 45°00′31″N 83°44′53″W. It was named for the Spratt family, who were pioneer lumbermen in the area. A post office operated from March 1900 until August 1934.

== Geography ==
According to the United States Census Bureau, the township has a total area of 80.06 miles (128.84 km), of which 71.04 miles (114.33 km) is land and 9.02 miles (14.52 km) (11.27%) is water, consisting primarily of Fletcher Pond in the southwestern part of the township.

== Demographics ==
As of the census of 2000, there were 1,205 people, 471 households, and 365 families residing in the township. The population density was 16.9 inhabitants per square mile (6.5/km^{2}). There were 789 housing units at an average density of 11.1 per square mile (4.3/km^{2}). The racial makeup of the township was 97.34% White, 0.41% African American, 0.41% Native American, 0.17% Asian, 1.16% from other races, and 0.50% from two or more races. Hispanic or Latino of any race were 1.08% of the population.

There were 471 households, out of which 29.5% had children under the age of 18 living with them, 67.9% were married couples living together, 5.9% had a female householder with no husband present, and 22.5% were non-families. 20.0% of all households were made up of individuals, and 7.9% had someone living alone who was 65 years of age or older. The average household size was 2.54 and the average family size was 2.89.

In the township the population was spread out, with 23.5% under the age of 18, 6.8% from 18 to 24, 25.5% from 25 to 44, 27.3% from 45 to 64, and 16.9% who were 65 years of age or older. The median age was 42 years. For every 100 females, there were 100.5 males. For every 100 females age 18 and over, there were 103.5 males.

The median income for a household in the township was $34,271, and the median income for a family was $37,768. Males had a median income of $32,083 versus $22,708 for females. The per capita income for the township was $16,454. About 4.6% of families and 7.2% of the population were below the poverty line, including 10.2% of those under age 18 and 3.4% of those age 65 or over.
