= Maple Ridge Township, Alpena County, Michigan =

Maple Ridge Township, Michigan
- Civil township
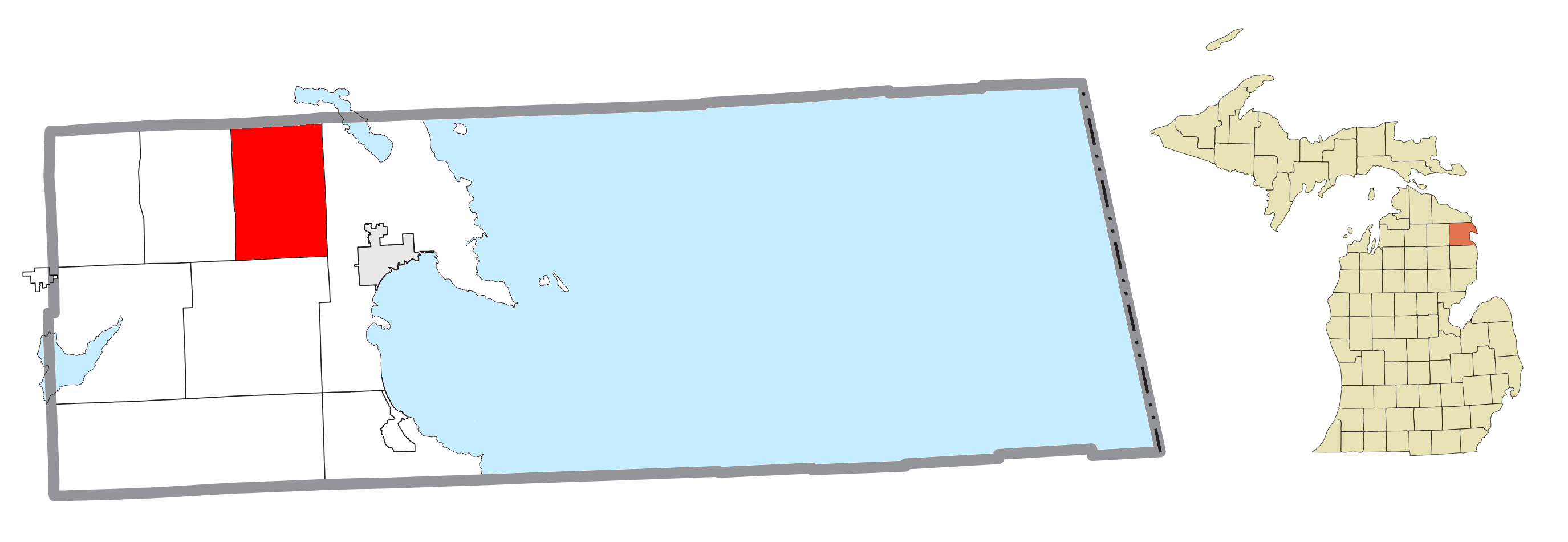
- Location within Alpena County

- Location within the state of Michigan Maple Ridge Township (the United States)
- Coordinates: 45°07′15″N 83°34′11″W
- Country: United States
- State: Michigan
- County: Alpena

Government
  - Supervisor: John Male
  - Clerk: Judy Hall

Area
  - Total: 53.82 sq mi (139.4 km^{2})
  - Land: 51.62 sq mi (133.7 km^{2})
  - Water: 2.20 sq mi (5.7 km^{2})
- Elevation: 712 ft (217 m)

Population (2020)
  - Total: 1,559
  - Density: 30.20/sq mi (11.66/km^{2})
- Time zone: UTC-5 (Eastern (EST))
  - Summer (DST): UTC-4 (EDT)
- ZIP code(s): 49707 (Alpena); 49776 (Posen)
- Area code: 989
- FIPS code: 26-51220
- GNIS feature ID: 1626677

Maple Ridge Township is a civil township of Alpena County in the U.S. state of Michigan. The population was 1,559 at the 2020 census.

== Communities ==
- Bolton is an unincorporated community in the township approximately 12 miles (19 km) northwest of Alpena along the partially abandoned Detroit and Mackinac Railway at 45°10′53″N 83°35′23″W. It was named for Henry Bolton, who along with Donal McRae opened a general store in Alpena in 1866. From 1871, as Bolton & McRae, they operated one of the leading cedar lumbering firms in the area. A post office operated here from October 1880 until March 1955.
- Cathro is an unincorporated community in the township approximately 10 miles (16 km) northwest of Alpena along the Detroit and Mackinac Railway at 45°09′32″N 83°33′16″W. The community was named for George Cathro, a prominent farmer in the area. A post office operated here from November 1894 until March 1955.

== Geography ==
According to the United States Census Bureau, the township has a total area of 53.82 square miles (139.39 km^{2}), of which 51.62 square miles (133.70 km^{2}) is land and 2.20 square miles (5.70 km^{2}) (4.09%) is water.

== Demographics ==
At the 2000 census, there were 1,715 people, 640 households and 490 families residing in the township. The population density was 33.0 inhabitants per square mile (12.7/km^{2}). There were 814 housing units at an average density of 15.7 per square mile (6.1/km^{2}). The racial makeup of the township was 99.30% White, 0.06% African American, 0.35% Native American, 0.06% Asian, and 0.23% from two or more races. Hispanic or Latino of any race were 0.17% of the population.

There were 640 households, of which 36.1% had children under the age of 18 living with them, 65.5% were married couples living together, 7.0% had a female householder with no husband present, and 23.3% were non-families. 19.4% of all households were made up of individuals, and 8.6% had someone living alone who was 65 years of age or older. The average household size was 2.68 and the average family size was 3.07.

27.9% of the population were under the age of 18, 5.9% from 18 to 24, 29.3% from 25 to 44, 23.9% from 45 to 64, and 12.9% who were 65 years of age or older. The median age was 38 years. For every 100 females, there were 103.4 males. For every 100 females age 18 and over, there were 107.0 males.

The median household income was $35,871 and the median family income was $38,490. Males had a median income of $33,482 and females $20,192. The per capita income $16,024. About 10.0% of families and 12.2% of the population were below the poverty line, including 16.4% of those under age 18 and 9.6% of those age 65 or over.
