= Alpena County, Michigan =

County in Michigan, United States

- County
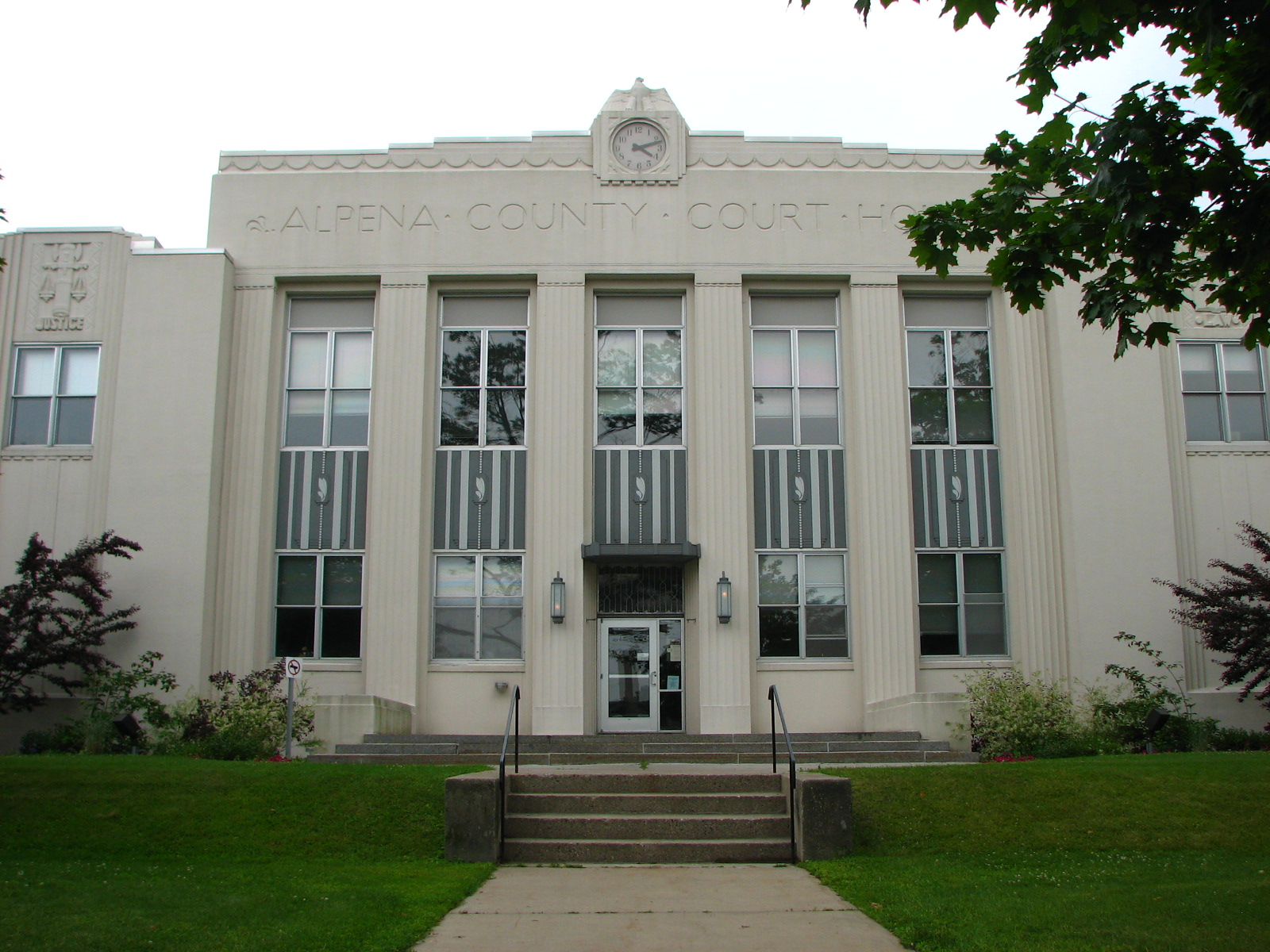
- Alpena County Courthouse

- Flag Seal

- Location within the U.S. state of Michigan
- Coordinates: 45°02′N 83°12′W
- Country: United States
- State: Michigan
- Founded: February 7, 1857
- Seat: Alpena
- Largest city: Alpena

Area
  - Total: 1,695 sq mi (4,390 km^{2})
  - Land: 572 sq mi (1,480 km^{2})
  - Water: 1,123 sq mi (2,910 km^{2}) 66%

Population (2020)
  - Total: 28,907
  - Estimate (2025): 28,853 ▼
  - Density: 50.5/sq mi (19.5/km^{2})
- Time zone: UTC−5 (Eastern)
  - Summer (DST): UTC−4 (EDT)
- Congressional district: 1st
- Website: www.alpenacounty.org

Alpena County (/ælˈpiːnə/ al-PEE-nə) is a county in the U.S. state of Michigan. As of the 2020 census, the population was 28,907. The county seat is Alpena. It is considered to be part of Northern Michigan. Alpena County comprises the Alpena, MI Micropolitan Statistical Area.

== History ==
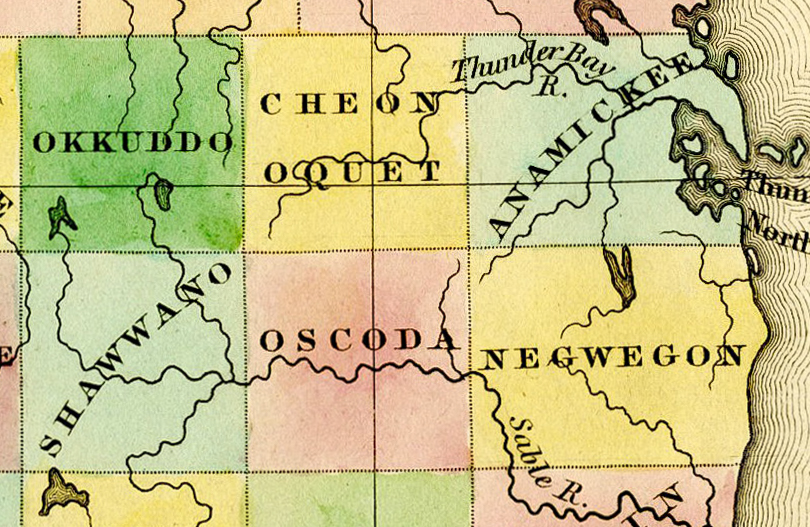
A detail from A New Map of Michigan with its Canals, Roads & Distances (1842) by Henry Schenck Tanner, showing Alpena County as Anamickee, the county's name from 1840 to 1843. Several nearby counties are also shown with names that would later be changed.

The county was created by the Michigan Legislature in 1840 as Anamickee County, (from animikii meaning thunder in Ojibwe) then renamed in 1843 to Alpena County, a pseudo-Native American word — a neologism coined by Henry Schoolcraft, meaning "a good partridge country." This was part of a much larger effort to rename a great many of the Michigan counties at the time. The Thunder Bay Band of Chippewa and Ottawa, the original indigenous inhabitants of the area, merged with the Mackinac Bands of Chippewa and Ottawa Indians in the mid-1800s under Chief Way-ge-maw-waw-be. The county was officially organized in 1857.

== Geography ==
According to the U.S. Census Bureau, the county has a total area of 1,695 square miles (4,390 km^{2}), of which 572 square miles (1,480 km^{2}) is land and 1,123 square miles (2,910 km^{2}) (66%) is water.

Alpena County is in the northeast of the mitten-shaped Lower Peninsula of Michigan. Lake Huron and Thunder Bay are to the east, Alcona County to the south, Oscoda County to the southwest, Montmorency County to the west, and Presque Isle County to the north. Most of the county is drained by the Thunder Bay River and its tributaries. The Mackinaw State Forest occupies large tracts of land in the county. The Thunder Bay National Marine Sanctuary is offshore adjacent to the county.

The 45th parallel bisects the county, meaning it is halfway between the North Pole and the equator.

Several islands in Thunder Bay are part of the Michigan Islands National Wildlife Refuge. There are automated lighthouses on Middle Island and Thunder Bay Island.

=== Geographic features ===
- Thunder Bay River
- Long Lake
- Grand Lake

Glaciers shaped the area, creating a unique regional ecosystem. A large portion of the area is so-called Grayling outwash plain, consisting of broad outwash plain including sandy ice-disintegration ridges; jack pine barrens, some white pine-red pine forest, and northern hardwood forests. Large lakes were created by glacial action. Some of the inland lakes are truly massive.

=== Adjacent counties ===
- Alcona County - south
- Oscoda County - southwest
- Montmorency County - west
- Presque Isle County - north

=== Major highways ===
- US 23 serves Alpena on its way along the Lake Huron shoreline. To the north, it passes past Long Lake and Grand Lake, thence to Rogers City, Michigan, through Cheboygan, Michigan, and on to Mackinaw City, Michigan, where it ends and connects to I-75 and the Mackinac Bridge.
- M-32 ends its 100-mile (160 km) easterly cross-peninsular route from Lake Michigan to Lake Huron within downtown Alpena at an intersection with US 23.
- M-65 is a more direct route to the south than US 23, which meanders along the lake shore through many villages and towns. M-65 goes north to Rogers City.

=== National protected area ===
- Michigan Islands National Wildlife Refuge (part)

== Communities ==
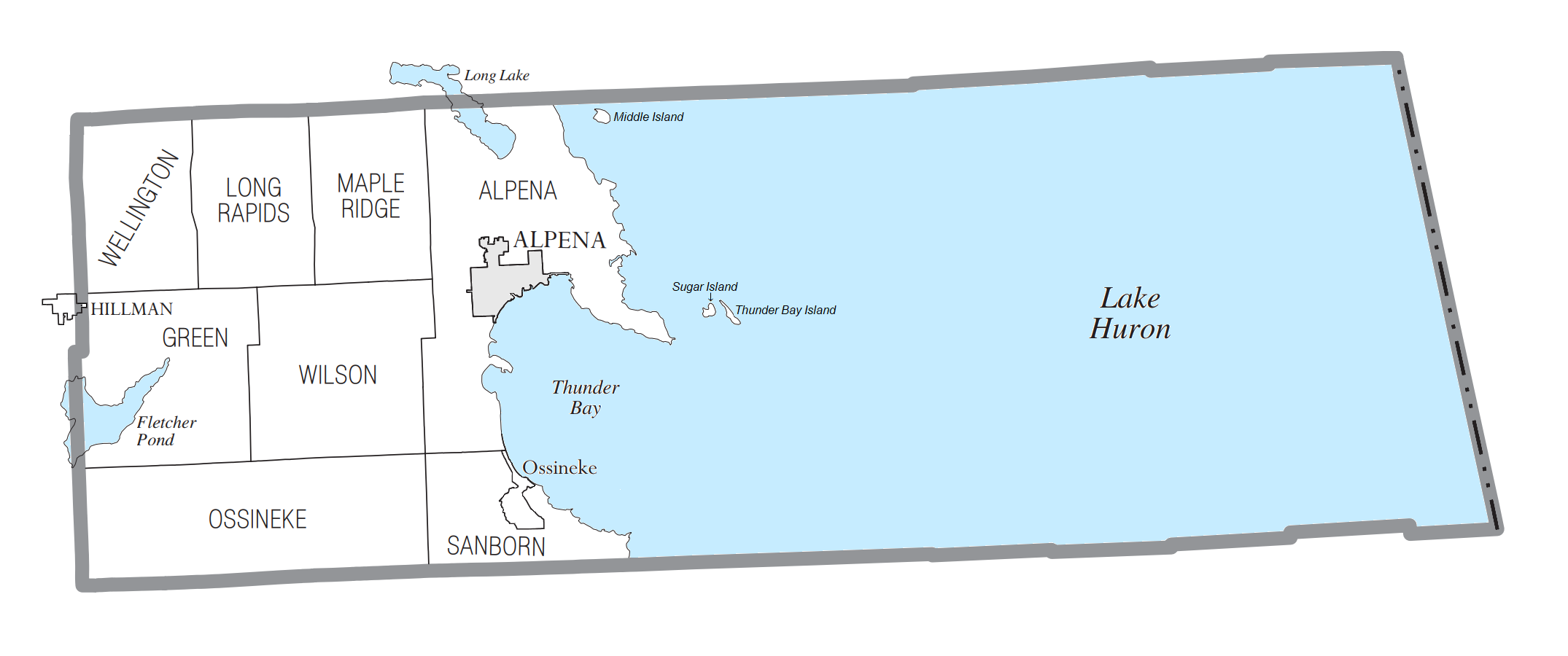
U.S. Census data map showing local municipal boundaries within Alpena County, as well as the CDP of Ossineke. Shaded areas represent incorporated cities.

=== City ===
- Alpena (county seat)

=== Village ===
- Hillman (partially)

=== Charter township ===
- Alpena Charter Township

=== Civil townships ===
- Green Township
- Long Rapids Township
- Maple Ridge Township
- Ossineke Township
- Sanborn Township
- Wellington Township
- Wilson Township

=== Census-designated place ===
- Ossineke

=== Other unincorporated communities ===
- Ashland
- Bolton
- Cathro
- Emerson Station
- Flanders
- Herron
- Hubbard Lake
- Lachine
- Lakewood
- Leer
- Long Rapids
- McHarg
- Paxton
- Rockport
- Spratt

== Demographics ==
Historical population
| Census | Pop. | Note | %± |
|---|---|---|---|
| 1860 | 290 | | — |
| 1870 | 2,756 | | 850.3% |
| 1880 | 8,789 | | 218.9% |
| 1890 | 15,581 | | 77.3% |
| 1900 | 18,254 | | 17.2% |
| 1910 | 19,965 | | 9.4% |
| 1920 | 17,869 | | −10.5% |
| 1930 | 18,574 | | 3.9% |
| 1940 | 20,766 | | 11.8% |
| 1950 | 22,189 | | 6.9% |
| 1960 | 28,556 | | 28.7% |
| 1970 | 30,708 | | 7.5% |
| 1980 | 32,315 | | 5.2% |
| 1990 | 30,605 | | −5.3% |
| 2000 | 31,314 | | 2.3% |
| 2010 | 29,598 | | −5.5% |
| 2020 | 28,907 | | −2.3% |
| 2025 (est.) | 28,853 | ▼ | −0.2% |
U.S. Decennial Census; 1790-1960 1900-1990; 1990-2000 2010-2018

=== Racial and ethnic composition ===
Alpena County, Michigan – Racial and ethnic composition Note: the US Census treats Hispanic/Latino as an ethnic category. This table excludes Latinos from the racial categories and assigns them to a separate category. Hispanics/Latinos may be of any race.
| Race / Ethnicity (NH = Non-Hispanic) | Pop 1980 | Pop 1990 | Pop 2000 | Pop 2010 | Pop 2020 | % 1980 | % 1990 | % 2000 | % 2010 | % 2020 |
|---|---|---|---|---|---|---|---|---|---|---|
| White alone (NH) | 32,075 | 30,249 | 30,626 | 28,623 | 27,006 | 99.26% | 98.84% | 97.80% | 96.71% | 93.42% |
| Black or African American alone (NH) | 17 | 35 | 73 | 78 | 99 | 0.05% | 0.11% | 0.23% | 0.26% | 0.34% |
| Native American or Alaska Native alone (NH) | 83 | 88 | 120 | 150 | 120 | 0.26% | 0.29% | 0.38% | 0.51% | 0.42% |
| Asian alone (NH) | 33 | 84 | 102 | 148 | 112 | 0.10% | 0.27% | 0.33% | 0.50% | 0.39% |
| Native Hawaiian or Pacific Islander alone (NH) | x | x | 1 | 10 | 12 | x | x | 0.00% | 0.03% | 0.04% |
| Other race alone (NH) | 28 | 4 | 8 | 2 | 67 | 0.09% | 0.01% | 0.03% | 0.01% | 0.23% |
| Mixed race or Multiracial (NH) | x | x | 203 | 283 | 1,074 | x | x | 0.65% | 0.96% | 3.72% |
| Hispanic or Latino (any race) | 79 | 145 | 181 | 304 | 417 | 0.24% | 0.47% | 0.58% | 1.03% | 1.44% |
| Total | 32,315 | 30,605 | 31,314 | 29,598 | 28,907 | 100.00% | 100.00% | 100.00% | 100.00% | 100.00% |

=== 2020 census ===
As of the 2020 census, the county had a population of 28,907. The median age was 48.1 years. 18.6% of residents were under the age of 18 and 24.7% of residents were 65 years of age or older. For every 100 females there were 97.6 males, and for every 100 females age 18 and over there were 95.5 males age 18 and over.

The racial makeup of the county was 94.0% White, 0.3% Black or African American, 0.4% American Indian and Alaska Native, 0.4% Asian, <0.1% Native Hawaiian and Pacific Islander, 0.4% from some other race, and 4.3% from two or more races. Hispanic or Latino residents of any race comprised 1.4% of the population.

53.4% of residents lived in urban areas, while 46.6% lived in rural areas.

There were 12,901 households in the county, of which 22.4% had children under the age of 18 living in them. Of all households, 44.7% were married-couple households, 20.4% were households with a male householder and no spouse or partner present, and 26.4% were households with a female householder and no spouse or partner present. About 33.1% of all households were made up of individuals and 16.1% had someone living alone who was 65 years of age or older.

There were 15,645 housing units, of which 17.5% were vacant. Among occupied housing units, 78.1% were owner-occupied and 21.9% were renter-occupied. The homeowner vacancy rate was 1.7% and the rental vacancy rate was 9.9%.

=== 2010 census ===
The 2010 United States census indicated Alpena County had a 2010 population of 29,598. This is a decrease of 1,716 people from 2000. Overall, the county had a -5.5% growth rate during this ten-year period. In 2010 there were 12,791 households and 8,164 families in the county. The population density was 51.8 per square mile (20.0 square kilometers).

There were 16,053 housing units at an average density of 28.1 per square mile (10.8 square kilometers). Among the population at the time, 97.5% were White, 0.5% Native American, 0.5% Asian, 0.3% Black or African American, 0.1% of some other race and 1.1% of two or more races. 1.0% were Hispanic or Latino (of any race). 26.8% were of German, 19.5% Polish, 12.9% French, French Canadian or Cajun, 8.1% English, 6.4% Irish and 5.7% American ancestry.

There were 12,791 households, out of which 25.3% had children under the age of 18 living with them, 50.0% were husband and wife families, 9.8% had a female householder with no husband present, 36.2% were non-families, and 30.8% were made up of individuals. The average household size was 2.27 and the average family size was 2.81.

In the county, the population was spread out, with 20.9% under age of 18, 7.4% from 18 to 24, 20.8% from 25 to 44, 31.5% from 45 to 64, and 19.5% who were 65 years of age or older. The median age was 46 years. For every 100 females there were 96.4 males. For every 100 females age 18 and over, there were 94.1 males.

The 2010 American Community Survey 3-year estimate indicated the median income for a household in the county was $36,242 and the median income for a family was $46,718. Males had a median income of $27,002 versus $15,670 for females. The per capita income for the county was $21,713. About 2.5% of families and 16.9% of the population were below the poverty line, including 27.2% of those under the age 18 and 10.0% of those age 65 or over.

== Government ==
United States presidential election results for Alpena County, Michigan
| Year | Republican | | Democratic | | Third party(ies) | |
| Year | No. | % | No. | % | No. | % |
|---|---|---|---|---|---|---|
| 1884 | 927 | 43.87% | 1,127 | 53.34% | 59 | 2.79% |
| 1888 | 1,486 | 47.14% | 1,504 | 47.72% | 162 | 5.14% |
| 1892 | 1,526 | 49.11% | 1,536 | 49.44% | 45 | 1.45% |
| 1896 | 1,777 | 51.03% | 1,665 | 47.82% | 40 | 1.15% |
| 1900 | 2,283 | 59.34% | 1,435 | 37.30% | 129 | 3.35% |
| 1904 | 2,498 | 69.37% | 907 | 25.19% | 196 | 5.44% |
| 1908 | 2,358 | 68.07% | 949 | 27.40% | 157 | 4.53% |
| 1912 | 709 | 19.99% | 1,105 | 31.15% | 1,733 | 48.86% |
| 1916 | 2,020 | 57.93% | 1,392 | 39.92% | 75 | 2.15% |
| 1920 | 3,467 | 63.38% | 1,893 | 34.61% | 110 | 2.01% |
| 1924 | 4,628 | 75.78% | 948 | 15.52% | 531 | 8.69% |
| 1928 | 3,467 | 63.43% | 1,984 | 36.30% | 15 | 0.27% |
| 1932 | 3,222 | 45.99% | 3,562 | 50.84% | 222 | 3.17% |
| 1936 | 3,536 | 49.97% | 3,231 | 45.66% | 309 | 4.37% |
| 1940 | 4,822 | 57.19% | 3,597 | 42.66% | 13 | 0.15% |
| 1944 | 4,453 | 60.78% | 2,856 | 38.98% | 18 | 0.25% |
| 1948 | 4,313 | 60.30% | 2,743 | 38.35% | 96 | 1.34% |
| 1952 | 6,248 | 66.32% | 3,134 | 33.27% | 39 | 0.41% |
| 1956 | 7,142 | 70.18% | 3,033 | 29.80% | 2 | 0.02% |
| 1960 | 6,573 | 56.41% | 5,071 | 43.52% | 9 | 0.08% |
| 1964 | 3,954 | 34.47% | 7,508 | 65.45% | 10 | 0.09% |
| 1968 | 5,717 | 50.77% | 4,788 | 42.52% | 756 | 6.71% |
| 1972 | 6,513 | 55.05% | 5,104 | 43.14% | 214 | 1.81% |
| 1976 | 6,380 | 49.59% | 6,310 | 49.04% | 176 | 1.37% |
| 1980 | 6,901 | 49.89% | 5,834 | 42.18% | 1,097 | 7.93% |
| 1984 | 8,212 | 61.30% | 5,136 | 38.34% | 49 | 0.37% |
| 1988 | 6,664 | 51.05% | 6,341 | 48.58% | 49 | 0.38% |
| 1992 | 4,878 | 32.37% | 6,894 | 45.75% | 3,297 | 21.88% |
| 1996 | 4,525 | 33.54% | 7,114 | 52.73% | 1,853 | 13.73% |
| 2000 | 6,769 | 47.90% | 7,053 | 49.91% | 310 | 2.19% |
| 2004 | 7,665 | 50.39% | 7,407 | 48.70% | 139 | 0.91% |
| 2008 | 7,125 | 47.11% | 7,705 | 50.95% | 294 | 1.94% |
| 2012 | 7,298 | 51.79% | 6,549 | 46.48% | 244 | 1.73% |
| 2016 | 9,090 | 61.55% | 4,877 | 33.02% | 801 | 5.42% |
| 2020 | 10,686 | 62.91% | 6,000 | 35.32% | 301 | 1.77% |
| 2024 | 10,967 | 63.71% | 6,038 | 35.08% | 208 | 1.21% |

United States Senate election results for Alpena County, Michigan1
| Year | Republican | | Democratic | | Third party(ies) | |
| Year | No. | % | No. | % | No. | % |
|---|---|---|---|---|---|---|
| 2024 | 10,567 | 62.61% | 5,827 | 34.53% | 483 | 2.86% |

Michigan Gubernatorial election results for Alpena County
| Year | Republican | | Democratic | | Third party(ies) | |
| Year | No. | % | No. | % | No. | % |
|---|---|---|---|---|---|---|
| 2022 | 7,920 | 56.65% | 5,779 | 41.34% | 281 | 2.01% |

The county government operates the jail, maintains rural roads, operates the major local courts, keeps files of deeds and mortgages, maintains vital records, administers public health regulations, and participates with the state in the provision of welfare and other social services. The county board of commissioners controls the budget but has only limited authority to make laws or ordinances. In Michigan, most local government functions — police and fire, building and zoning, tax assessment, street maintenance, etc. — are the responsibility of individual cities and townships.

The county operates three parks (and camp grounds) with beaches on local lakes, namely Beaver Lake Park in Lachine; Long Lake Park in Alpena; and Sunken Lake Park in Posen

== Media ==
The Alpena News is the daily newspaper of record for much of Northeast lower peninsula of Michigan. For a complete list of other media, see Alpena, Michigan.

== Arts and culture ==
=== Museums ===
- Besser Museum for Northeast Michigan
- Thunder Bay National Marine Sanctuary.

=== Historical markers ===
There are seven recognized historical markers in the county:

- Alpena County Courthouse
- Alpena City Hall
- The Daniel Carter Family
- First Congregational Church [Alpena]
- Monarch Mill
- St. Bernard Catholic Church
- World's Largest Cement Plant

== See also ==
- Alpena Community College
- List of Michigan State Historic Sites in Alpena County
- National Register of Historic Places listings in Alpena County, Michigan
