= Thunder Bay River =

River in Michigan, United States

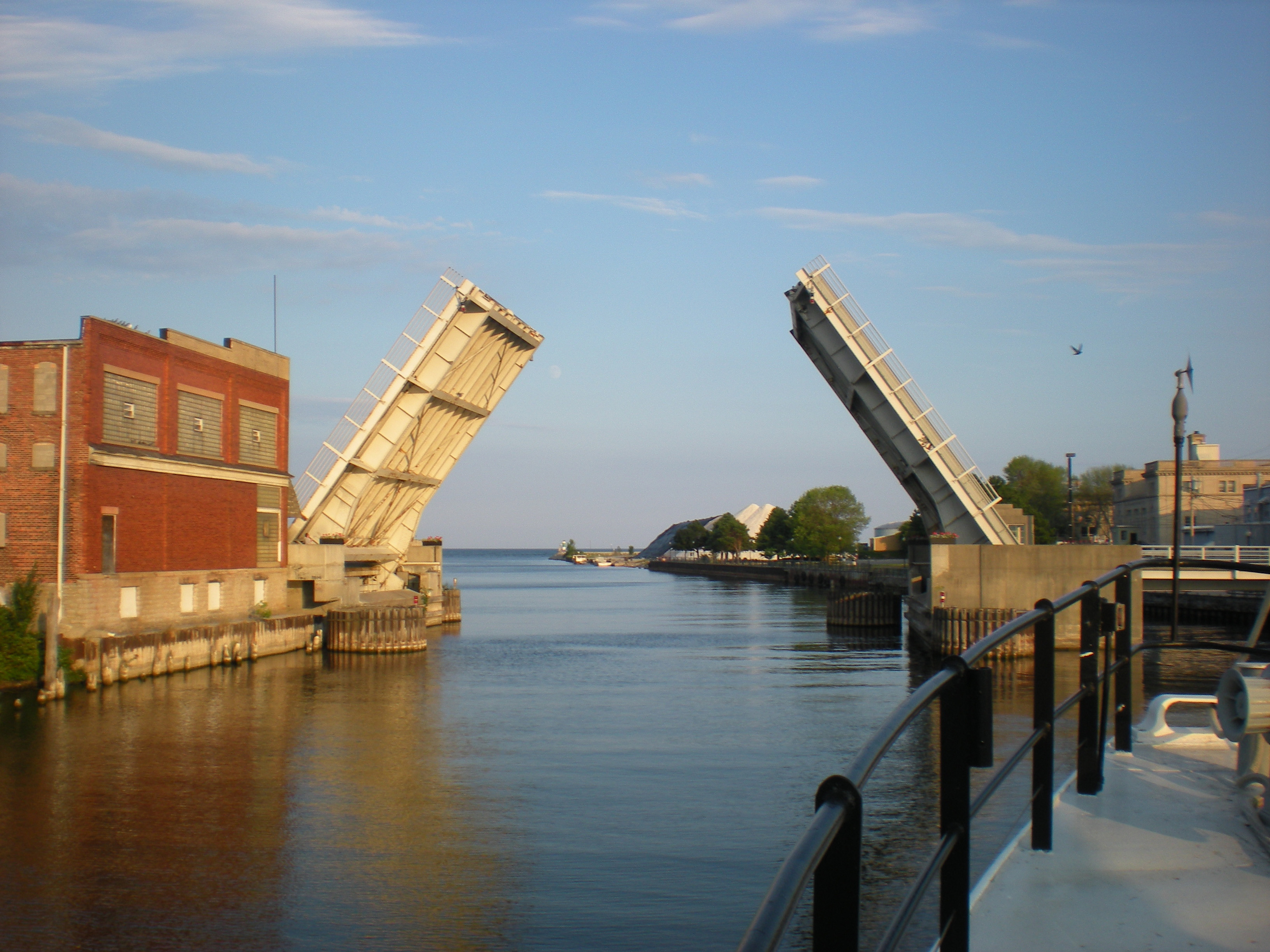
- The Thunder Bay River in Alpena

Physical characteristics
- Source
  - location: McCormick Lake near Atlanta
  - coordinates: 44°57′41″N 84°14′39″W
- Mouth
  - location: Thunder Bay in Alpena
  - coordinates: 45°3′40″N 83°25′33″W
- Length: 75.4 mi (121.3 km)

The Thunder Bay River is a 75.4-mile-long (121.3 km) river in the U.S. state of Michigan. It drains much of Alpena County and Montmorency County, and a small portion of Oscoda County, into Thunder Bay, a bay of Lake Huron, on the eastern side of northern Michigan. The mouth of the river is in the heart of downtown Alpena and is guarded by the Alpena Light Station.

== Geography ==
Unlike many of Michigan's rivers, the Thunder Bay River drops considerably from its headwaters in southwestern Montmorency County to Lake Huron. A hill near the headwaters northeast of Lewiston is 1,270 feet (390 m) above sea level and 689 feet (210 m) above lake level. A former whitewater stretch northwest of Alpena, the "Long Rapids", carried the river down from the northern Michigan plateau to Thunder Bay. The rapids have since been drowned under Lake Winyah (also known as Seven Mile Pond), a hydroelectric reservoir created by the Norway Dam (also known as Seven Mile Dam). (Note: see map in external links hereafter)

Much of the middle and upper reaches of the Thunder Bay River flow through the Mackinaw State Forest, which is a large swathe of northeastern Michigan that, after logging was completed in the 1910s, reverted to the state for unpaid property taxes. The state forest contains large numbers of aspen and birch trees, pulpwood trees typical of second-growth Michigan forests.

The largest reservoir in the Thunder Bay River basin, the 8,500-acre (3,400 ha) Fletcher Pond (also called Fletcher Floodwaters) in western Alpena County, began to fill in 1932. It is noted for having the second largest population of ospreys in the Midwest. As of 2006, pond riparian property owners were actively trying to counter an exotic infestation of Eurasian watermilfoil.

== Boardwalk ==
As of 2007, planning was underway for a $3.4 million river-edge boardwalk, the 2,800-foot-long (850 m) Great Lakes Maritime Heritage Trail on the north shore of the Thunder Bay River in central Alpena. The boardwalk route passes through a former industrial site, the Fletcher Paper Mill. The boardwalk will be signposted with plaques and kiosks telling the history of the river.

== Bridges ==
Eager to help the motor vehicle industry, the Michigan Department of Transportation was one of the first state agencies in the U.S. to build concrete bridges. A good example, 150 feet (46 m) long, can be found spanning the Thunder Bay River at Hillman. Raised in 1922, it is of the variety called a concrete camelback bridge, and is said to be the fifth longest such bridge in the state. The Great Lakes Maritime Heritage Trail will include a new pedestrian bridge across the Thunder Bay in central Alpena.

== Fish ==
According to the Michigan Department of Natural Resources, the Thunder Bay River, and especially Fletcher Pond, have populations of bass, pike, and panfish. The river is also now the home of an exotic population of Eurasian ruffe.
