= Besser =

Besser is a surname. Notable people with the surname include:

- Astrid Besser (born 1989), Italian tennis player
- Chaskel Besser (1923–2010), Polish-American Rabbi
- Hans Besser (1510 – after 1558), German portrait painter
- Hans Besser (chess player) (1935–2002), German chess master
- Howard Besser (born c. 1952), American scholar of digital preservation, digital libraries, and preservation of film and video
- Jesse Besser (1882–1970), American inventor, who invented a machine for making Besser blocks
- Joe Besser (1907–1988), American comedian
- Les Besser (born 1936), American electronics engineer, and founder of Compact Software, the first RF and microwave EDA company
- Linton Besser (born 1976 or 1977), Australian journalist
- Matt Besser (born 1967), American actor, comedian, director, producer, writer
- Richard E. Besser (born 1959), American doctor and executive
- Robert Dennis Besser, see Robert Denning (1927–2005), American interior designer
- Stuart M. Besser, American film producer
- Wilibald Swibert Joseph Gottlieb von Besser (1784–1842), Austrian botanist

== See also ==
- Besser Mfg. Co. v. United States
- Besser Museum for Northeast Michigan
- Besserer
