= Glik's =

American retail clothing chain

- Type: Private
- Industry: Retail
- Founded: 1897
- Founder: Joseph Glik
- Headquarters: Collinsville, Illinois, U.S.
- Number of locations: approx. 70
- Area served: Midwestern United States
- Products: Clothing, footwear
- Website: gliks.com

Glik's is an American retail clothing chain based in Collinsville, Illinois. It was founded in 1897 by Joseph Glik. The chain operates more than 70 locations in 11 states across the Midwestern United States, primarily in Illinois, Michigan, Nebraska, Kansas and Minnesota.

== History ==
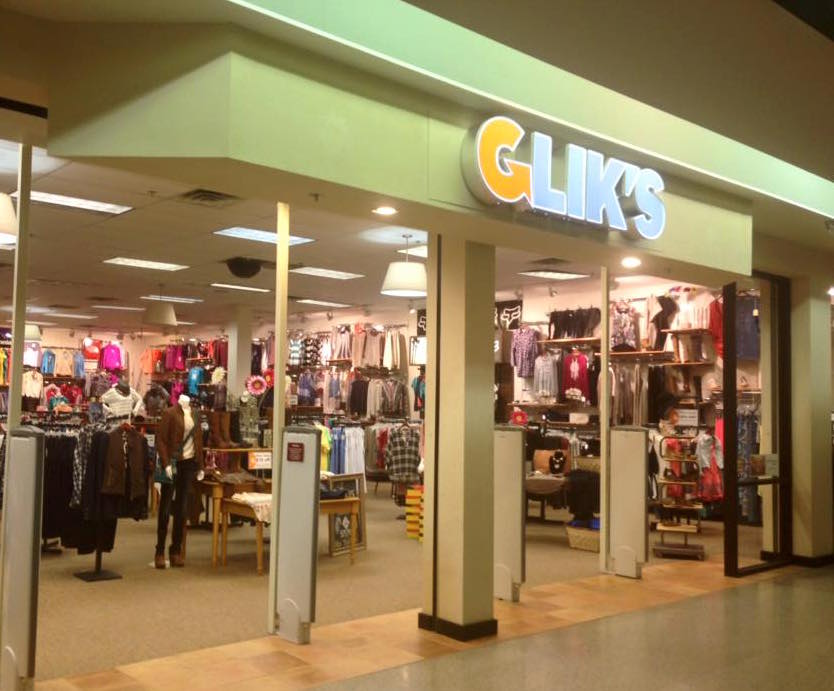
Glik's in Alpena Mall, Alpena, Michigan.

Joseph Glik began the Glik's chain in 1897 in St. Louis, Missouri, where he sold dry goods. Five years later, he opened a second store in Madison, Illinois. The Granite City store was sold to his son, Morris; originally called Good Luck, and later, Boston Store, it took the name Glik's in 1925. Morris's son, Joe Glik, later took control of the store and began expanding it as a chain throughout Illinois. The majority of its locations are in smaller towns with populations as small as 4,700.

In the 1980s, the chain created concept stores. Among these were a men's clothing store called Glik's for Guys, a young adult clothing store called Glik's Ltd., and a discount chain called $10 for Less. Both $10 for Less (later renamed $20 for Less) and another concept, Glik's Sports, were eliminated in 1999.

By the late 1990s, the chain had expanded into Michigan, with its first locations there having been converted from Dancer's clothing stores.
