= Pewabic =

The term Pewabic could refer to:

- SS Pewabic, an American freighter in service from 1863 to 1865
- Pewabic Pottery, a ceramic studio and school in Detroit, Michigan
