= Herman and Hattie (Ely) Besser House =

- U.S. National Register of Historic Places
- Interactive map
- Location: 403 South 2nd Ave. Alpena, Michigan
- Coordinates: 45°3′36″N 83°26′16″W
- Built: 1923
- Architectural style: Bungalow/American Craftsman
- NRHP reference No.: 100009278
- Added to NRHP: August 24, 2023

The Herman and Hattie (Ely) Besser House is a two-story bungalow home located at 403 South 2nd Avenue in Alpena, Michigan. It was listed on the National Register of Historic Places in 2023.

== History ==
Herman Besser was born near Buffalo, New York, in 1853. Harriette M. Ely was born nearby in 1855. The two married in 1881 in Cheektowaga, New York. Their first child, Jesse, was born in 1882, and soon after the family moved to Montmorency County, Michigan, where they purchased extensive timber holdings. In 1897, Herman Besser established the Besser Stave and Shingle Mill in Alpena. In 1898, the Bessers purchased a two-story frame house located at 403 South 2nd Avenue.

However, the Alpena area was shifting away from the timber industry. In 1899, Besser and others established the Alpena Portland Cement Company, with Besser serving as president. He also began shifting his stave company away from wood, renaming it Besser Manufacturing in 1901. In 1904, Herman and his son Jesse Besser designed a cement block machine at Besser Manufacturing, and the company was soon turning out cement blocks and other building material. The company began improving their block manufacturing machines, and soon realized that there was more profit in selling the machines than the blocks themselves. The Bessers continued to improve their machines, and Besser Manufacturing became a major supplier of cement block making equipment.

In 1923, Herman Besser constructed a new house at 403 South 2nd Avenue, using experimental trials, produced by Besser Manufacturing, of what became Besser's patented fractured concrete blocks. Herman and Hattie Besser lived in the house until their deaths (in 1926 and 1943, respectively). The house was sold to Guy Austin Lutes in 1945, and his descendants continue to live there.

== Description ==
The Herman and Hattie (Ely) Besser House is a two-story bungalow designed in the American Craftsman style. It is constructed using Herman Besser's patented concrete fractured blocks for exterior cladding. Some blocks contain red pigment, which decorate the house's corners, porch columns, and the basement wall. The second story is tucked underneath a side-gable roof with large dormers facing both front and rear.

== See also ==
- Besser Museum for Northeast Michigan
- National Register of Historic Places listings in Alpena County, Michigan
