= Fish tug =

Type of fishing boat

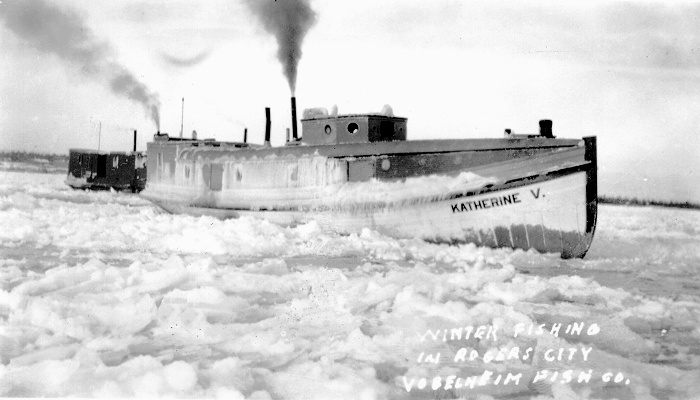
Katherine V, displayed at the Besser Museum of Northeast Michigan, is believed to be the last remaining intact wooden fish tug.

A fish tug (also spelled fishtug or referred to as a fishing tug) is a type of commercial fishing vessel used primarily on the Great Lakes and the Saint Lawrence Seaway in the 20th century.

== History ==
Fish tugs evolved from small, open, motorised boats that had largely replaced sail-powered vessels on the Great Lakes by the early 1900s. To improve safety and efficiency, fishermen began enclosing cabins and installing mechanical net lifters. These early adaptations still left the forward deck and stern exposed.

By the 1930s, it became common to install pilothouses amidship or near the stern, and extend the cabin covering to the bow, forming what was known as a "sprayhood".

Steel-hulled boats began to replace wooden-hulled vessels in the late 1950s. In the 1970s, government regulations in the United States severely restricted gill-net fishing, leading to a sharp decline in fish tug operations.

== Present day ==
Today, few fish tugs remain in operation. Many surviving vessels have been preserved as historical artefacts and are no longer used for commercial fishing.

A number of fish tugs are still active on the Canadian side of Lake Erie, where gillnet fisheries are regulated and remain viable. Some operations continue on Lake Huron, and a few fish tugs are also used by tribal fisheries across the Great Lakes.

== Notable example ==
The Katherine V is a wooden-hulled fish tug built in 1928 in Rogers City, Michigan. Operated until 1970, it was restored and donated to the Besser Museum for Northeast Michigan. It is believed to be the last intact wooden fish tug in existence.

== See also ==
- Gillnetting
- Great Lakes
