= Alpena Flyer =

The Alpena Flyer was an American automobile manufactured between 15 June 1910 and 1914 in Alpena, Michigan by the Alpena Motor Car Company. Approximately 480 cars in 13 models were produced, costing around $1,500, and only one remaining car is known to exist today. The car was intended to be light and inexpensive, and to make Alpena into an "Automobile City".

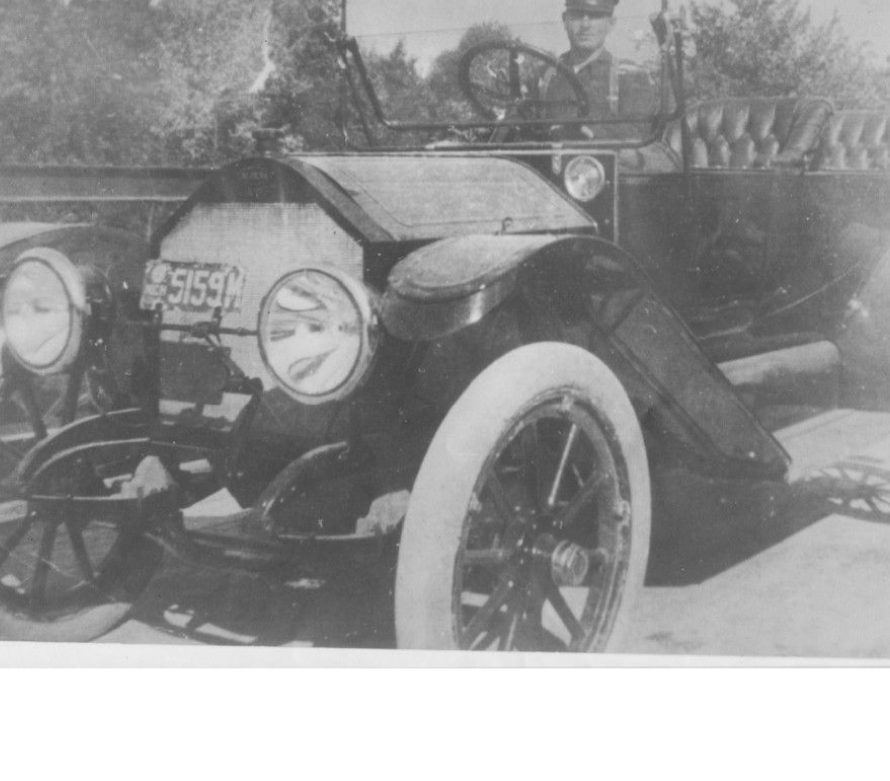
An Alpena Flyer in 1912

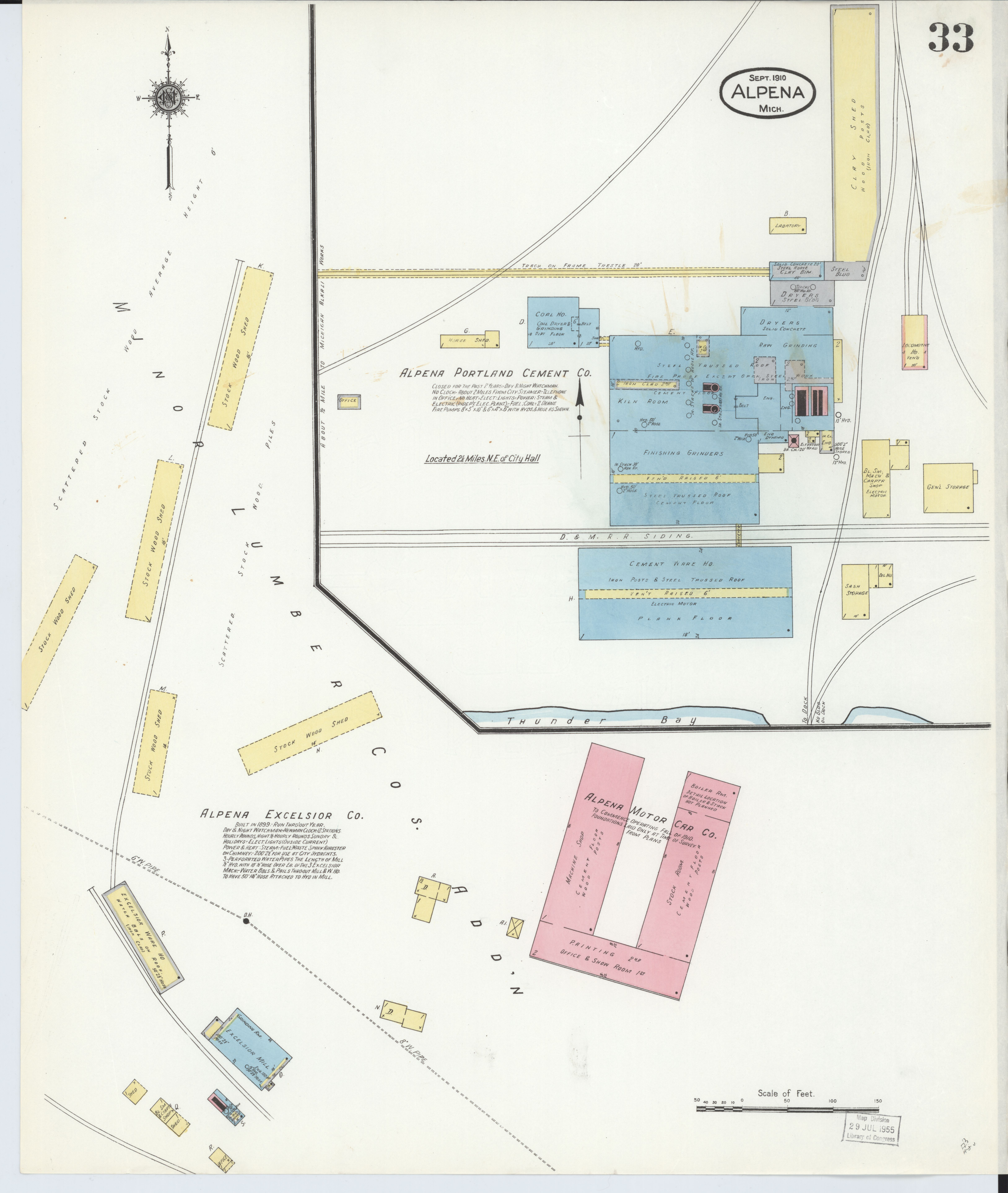
Alpena Motor Car Company Plant (1910) The plant contains 38,000 square feet of floor space. Main building is 170 x 50 feet, two stories, with two wings, one stories high, each 240 x 60 feet.

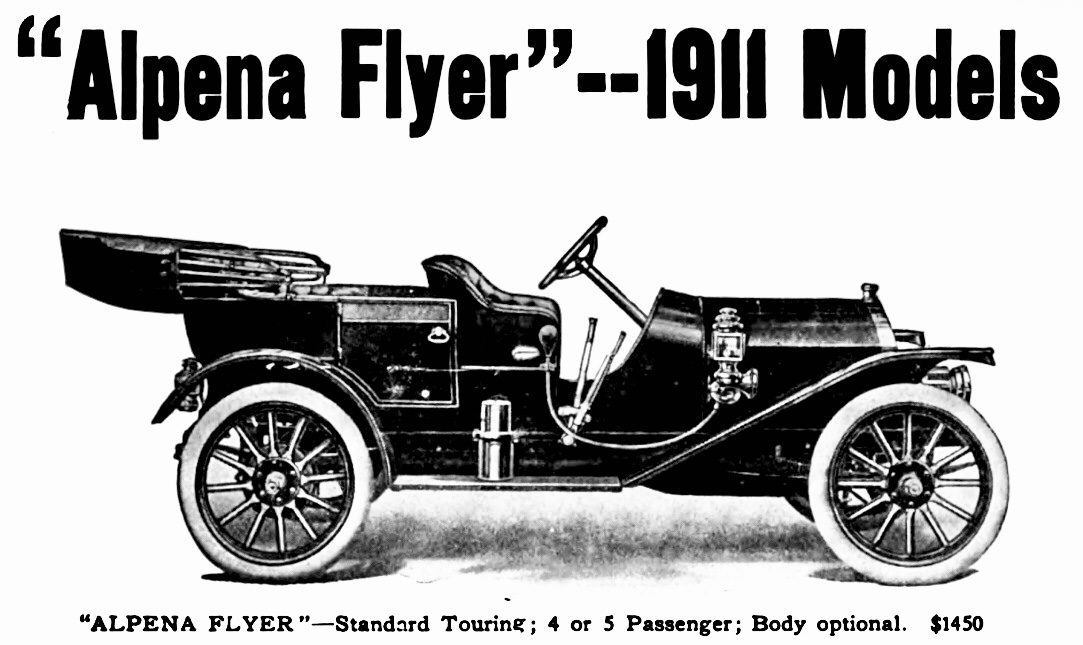
Alpena Flyer(1911)

== Models ==
The Alpena Flyer was produced as a standard touring car for 4 or 5 passengers; a four-door, 5 passenger touring car; and a roadster. Prices for the 1911 Alpena Flyer standard touring car was $1450; the four-door, 5 passenger car was $1600; and the roadster was $1450. In the year 1910, 17 vehicles were produced by 70 workers.

The Alpena Flyer was designed for speed, using unit engine/gearbox construction with three-point suspension. Specifications of the 1911 model included a four-cylinder engine made by Northway or Rutenber. It had almost 40 horsepower, disc clutch, water cooling, a Splitdorf magneto, Schebler carburetor, sliding gear transmission with three speeds and reverse, a 112 in (280 cm) wheelbase, 34 in (86 cm) wheels and 24 inch x 3 1/2-inch tires, and torque tube drive. It weighed 2,250 lb (1,020 kg) and was offered only in dark royal blue.

The 1912 Alpena Flyer had 7 models, which included a 40-horsepower engine, 120" wheelbase, 36x4 tires, electric lights, self-start, 3 oil lamps, 2 gas headlamps, and removable rims.

1912 Model J - Alpena "thirty" 4 door touring

1912 Model F - Alpena "forty" four-door touring car

1912 Model G - Alpena "forty" Gentlemen's Speedster

== History ==
In order to acquire tools and equipment for vehicle production at a low cost, the Alpena Motor Car Company, which has a capital of 450,000 dollars, was able to take over the recently closed Wolverine Motor Car Company from Mt. Clemens, Michigan.

In 1911 the Alpena Flyer was advertised as "The Greatest, Biggest and Most Sensational Actual Values In The Automobile World For $1450.00."

Alpena Motor Car ran into legal and financial problems shortly after the Flyer was first built. In 1912, the company was sued for patent infringement over its suspension design. The patent holder, Emile Huber, brought suit against the company, and the car manufacturer was fined $400,000 for the offense. A cash shortage followed and the company was insolvent by 1914.

Of the several hundred cars built by Alpena Motor Car, just one example survives, on display in Alpena at the Besser Museum. This example is a 1911 Standard Touring Alpena Flyer.

Production figures are unclear, but the company likely did not make more than 1,000 cars. Some estimate that it only produced a few hundred units.

== See also ==
- Brass Era car
