= K. J. Stevens =

American novelist and short story writer (born 1973)

- Born: June 4, 1973 (age 53); Alpena, Michigan, U.S.
- Education: Central Michigan University; Hamline University
- Occupations: Novelist, short story writer
- Spouse(s): artist, Brooke Stevens
- Relatives: Kim (father), Rita (mother), Kevin (brother), Keith (brother)
- Writing career
- Period: 1996–present
- Genre: Fiction
- Subjects: Relationships, family, love alcoholism
- Notable work: Pilgrims Bay
- Movement: Minimalism
- Website: kj.stevens.googlepages.com/home

K. J. Stevens (born June 4, 1973) is an American novelist and short story writer. His writing has appeared in The Adirondack Review, Fluid Magazine, Me Three, Circle Magazine, Cellar Door, Prose Ax, Temenos, and BloodLotus. Pilgrims Bay, Stevens first novel, was released in 2007.

Stevens' writing style has been described as minimalist. Ernest Hemingway, J.D. Salinger, Gertrude Stein, Amanda Davis, Sylvia Plath, Raymond Carver, David Shaw, and Flannery O'Connor have been attributed as his influences.

== Biography ==
Stevens was born in Alpena, Michigan, but grew up in Maple Ridge Township. Stevens attended Central Michigan University up to December 1999, where he published his first work with fellow Michigan writer Travis Mulhauser, titled Corvallis Road. Afterwards, he studied creative writing at Hamline University in Saint Paul, Minnesota.

He currently resides in Alpena, Michigan.

== Bibliography ==
=== Novels ===
- Pilgrims Bay (2007)
- Black (2012) - published by Red-Raw (London UK)

=== Collections ===
- Corvallis Road (with Travis Mulhauser ) (1999)
- A Better Place (2002)
- Infidelity (2004)
- Dead Bunnies (2004)
- CUTTING TEETH (2012)

=== Poetry ===
- Introspection (chapbook) (1999)

=== Nonfiction ===
- Landscaping (2007)

== Works ==
- "CUTTING TEETH" by K.J. Stevens
- "Pilgrim's Bay" by K.J. Stevens
- "Dead Bunnies" by K.J. Stevens
- Full text of Seven Corners by K.J. Stevens
- Full text of In Debt by K.J. Stevens
- Full text of The Throw Away by K.J. Stevens
- Full text of Dead Bunnies by K.J. Stevens
- Poems by K.J. Stevens
