= Alpena Motor Car Company =

American Car Manufacturer that no longer exists

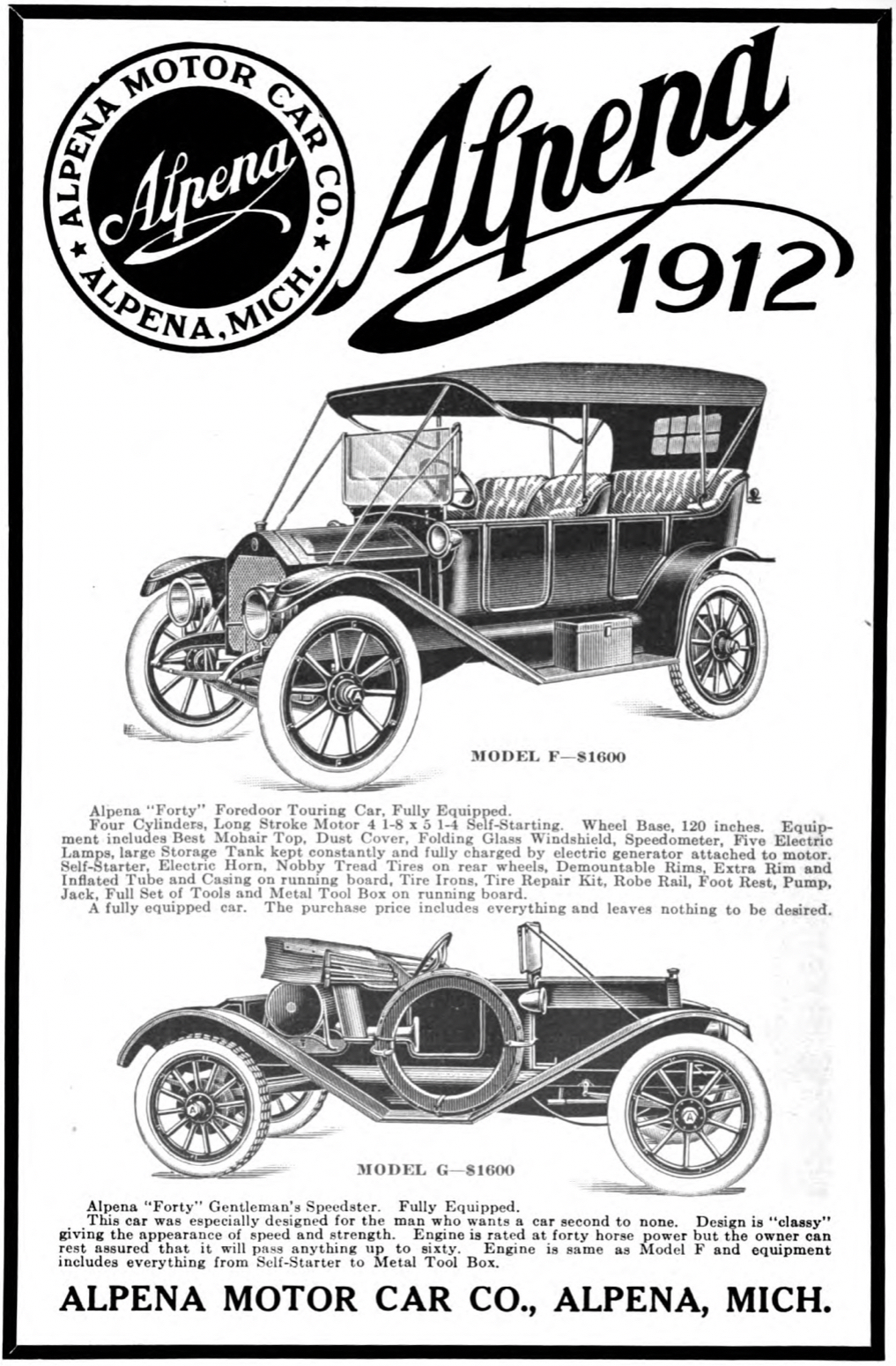
Alpena advertisement (1912)

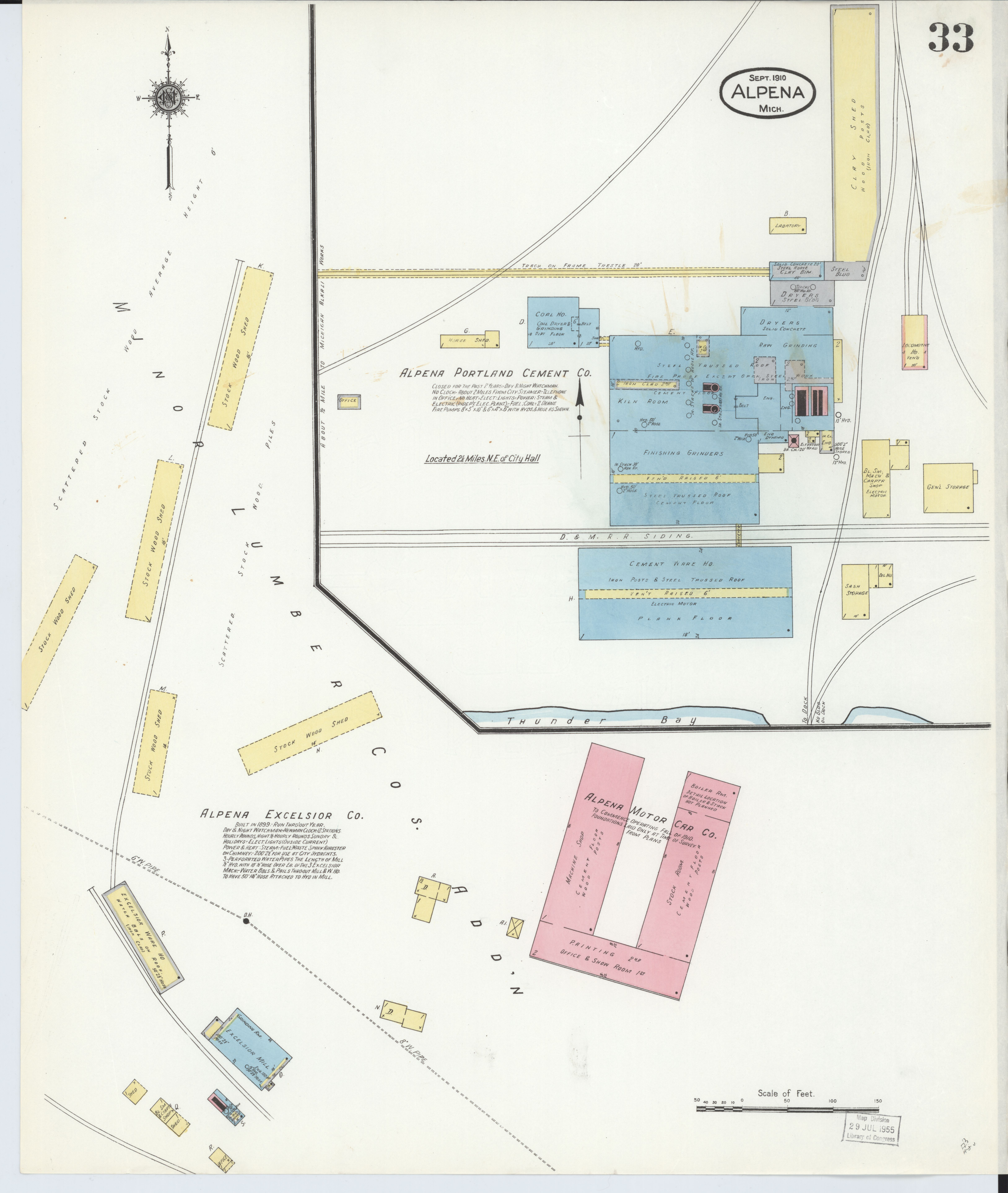
Alpena plant (1910)

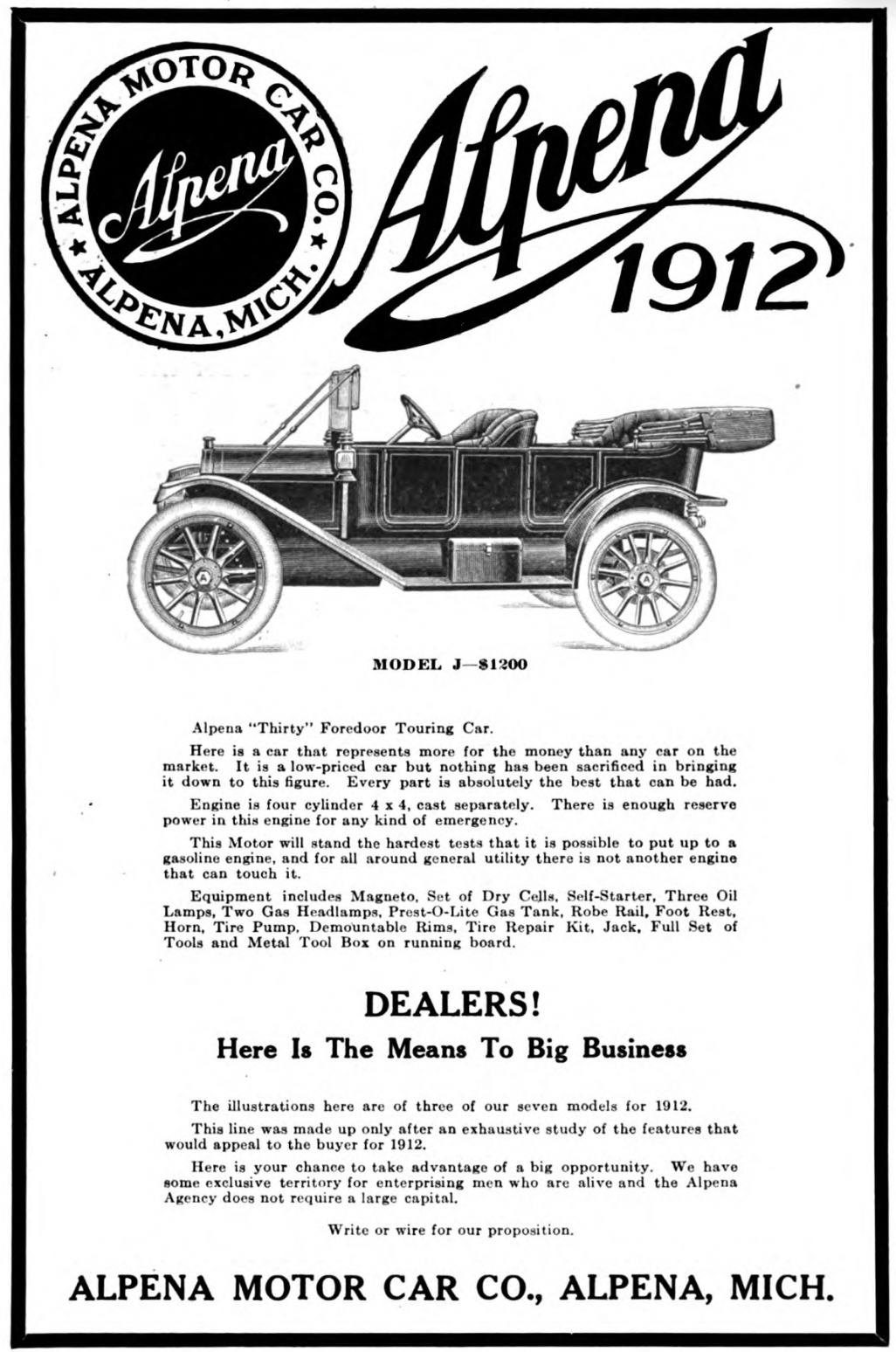
Alpena Model J advertisement (1912)

The Alpena Motor Car Company was an American automobile manufacturer incorporated in June 1910 that closed in 1913 and declared bankruptcy in February 1914. The company's flagship project was the Alpena Flyer in 13 different models, of which approximately 480 were produced and one remains today. The company had a factory at 150 Elm St. and 801 Johnson St. (these were in fact the same location) in Alpena, Michigan, although production began at a different site whilst this factory was under construction. $450,000 in stock was raised by approximately 200 investors, and at its formation the company had D D Hanover as president (later replaced by Richard Collins), and William Krebs as vice president. The factory employed 70 people, and there were claims that Alpena would become an "Automobile City" and that the factory would soon be producing 3,000 a year, although these did not transpire. The company was sued for patent infringement over its suspension design in 1912 and a cash shortage followed that lead the company to become bankrupt in 1914. The assets were auctioned to the Besser Company for $5,200 and the remaining car parts are believed to have been sold to a Canadian firm.
