= Temple Beth El (Alpena, Michigan) =

Unaffiliated synagogue in Michigan, US

Temple Beth-El
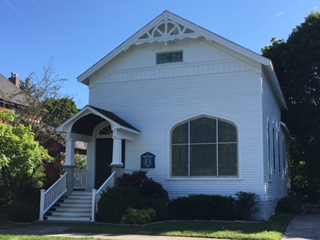

- Location in Michigan

Religion
- Affiliation: Judaism
- Ecclesiastical or organizational status: Synagogue
- Status: Active

Location
- Location: 125 White Street, Alpena, Michigan
- Country: United States
- Interactive map of Temple Beth-El
- Coordinates: 45°03′33.3″N 83°26′10.1″W

Architecture
- Type: Synagogue
- Established: 1889 (as a congregation)
- Completed: 1889

Website
- templebethelalpena.org

Temple Beth-El is a non-denomational Jewish synagogue, located at 125 White Street, in Alpena, Michigan, in the United States. It is the only synagogue in northeastern Lower Michigan. The congregation is closely associated with the Hebrew Benevolent Society Cemetery. (Note: The oldest synagogue in continuous use in Michigan is Temple Beth Shalom in Traverse City, Michigan, dating back to 1885. Older congregations in Michigan (not buildings) exist. E.g., Temple Beth Israel (Jackson, Michigan) a Reform synagogue was formed in 1862 by Jews of German background, organized in 1858, and was the second Reform congregation in Michigan. Temple Beth El (Detroit) was founded in 1850.)

While having no resident rabbi, the temple occasionally brings in visiting rabbis or cantors. It also has periodic outreach programs, which include dialogue with other religious groups in Alpena, Michigan.

The temple is located at 125 White Street in a vernacular style building built in 1889, making it one of America's relatively few surviving 19th century synagogues. The building was moved to the present site in 1891.

The congregation's archives are in the library of Wayne State University.
