= Besserer =

Besserer is a surname. Notable people with the surname include:

- Eugenie Besserer (1868–1934), American actress
- Louis-Théodore Besserer (1785–1861), Canadian businessman, notary, and politician

== See also ==
- Bessemer (disambiguation)
- Besser
- Besserer von Thalfingen
