= SS Pewabic =

Package freighter that served ports on the Upper Great Lakes

- Pewabic (propeller) shipwreck site
- U.S. National Register of Historic Places
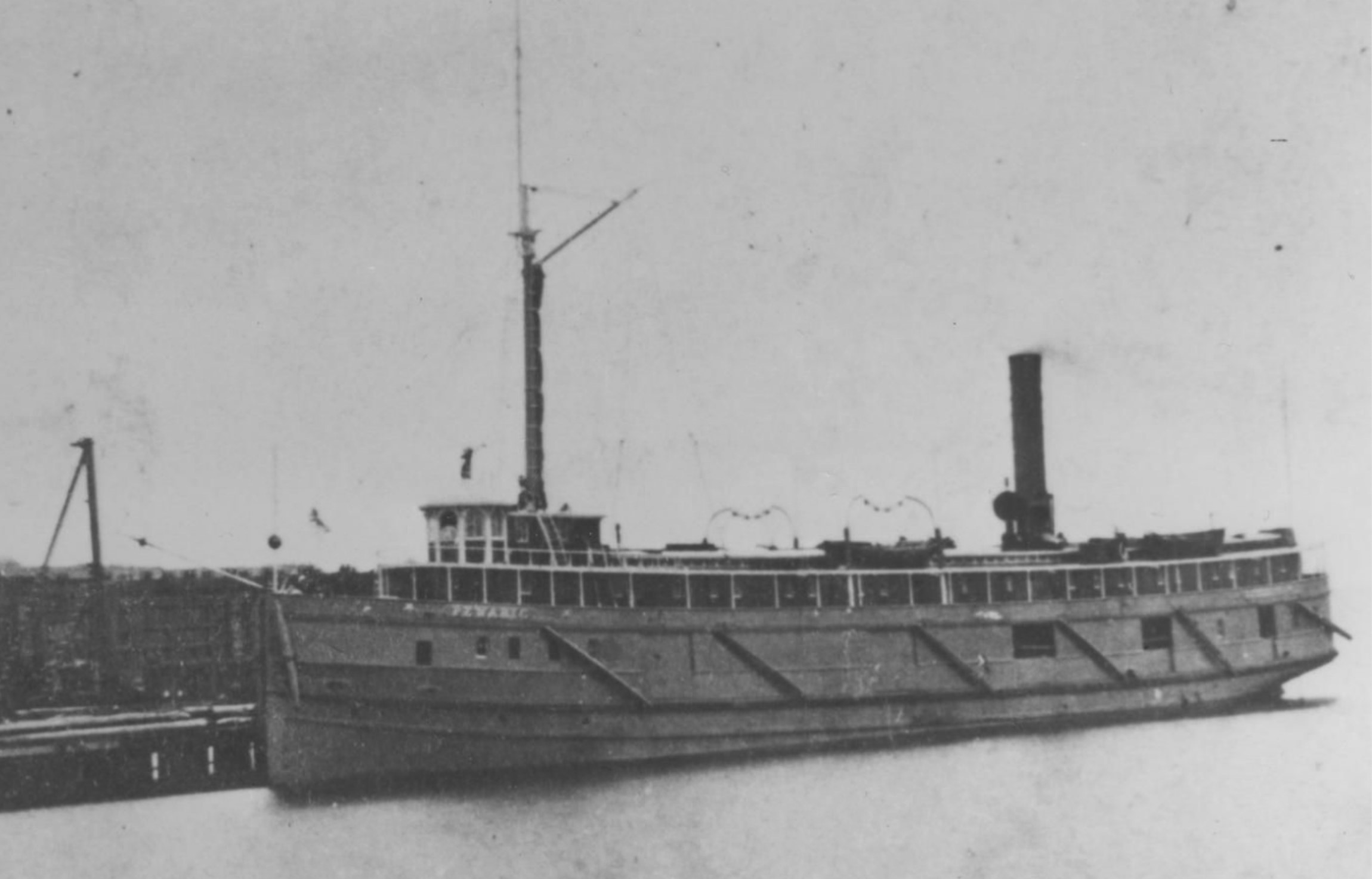
- The Pewabic prior to her sinking

- Location within Michigan Location within the United States
- Location: Lake Huron
- Nearest city: Alpena Township, Michigan
- Coordinates: 44°57′53″N 83°6′14″W
- NRHP reference No.: 14001096
- Added to NRHP: August 22, 2016

SS Pewabic was a package freighter that served ports on the Upper Great Lakes. She was launched in October 1863, fitted out in the spring of 1864, and was in active service until she sank off Thunder Bay Island in Lake Huron on August 9, 1865, due to collision with her sister vessel. There was significant loss of life, with a number variously estimated at 100 to 125 passengers and crew of the stricken vessel going down with the ship. If the higher number is accepted, the loss of life made this disaster, in terms of loss of life from the sinking of a single vessel, the seventh-worst tragedy in the history of the Great Lakes, and the worst ever on Lake Huron. The sunken hull of the package freighter is a feature of the present-day Thunder Bay National Marine Sanctuary.

== History ==
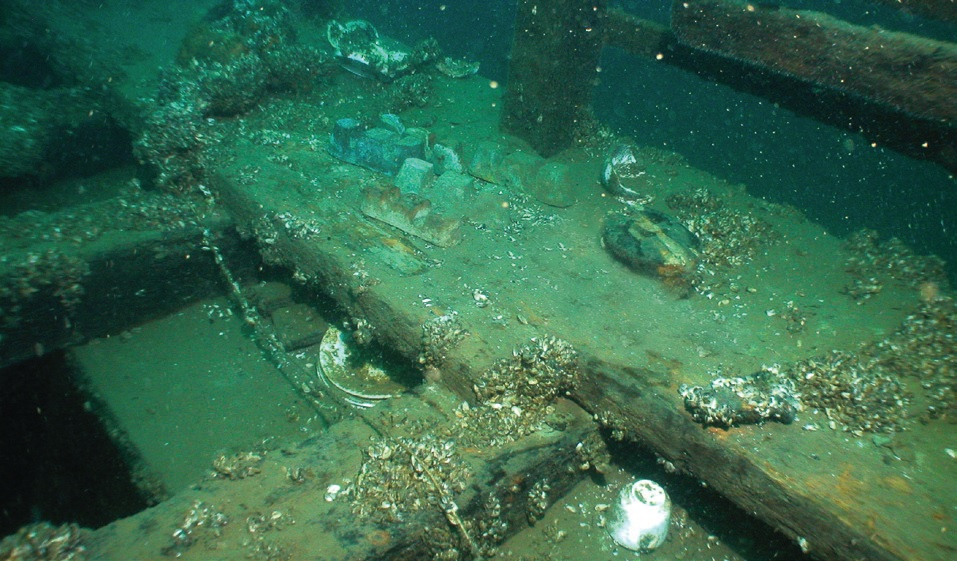
Pewabic artifacts

The Pewabic was built for the Lake Superior Transit Company by the Peck & Masters yard in Cleveland. She was 200 feet (61 m) long and had a beam of 31 feet (9.4 m). Known as the Pioneer Line, Lake Superior Transit specialized in the fast shipment of passengers and freight between Lake Erie and Lake Superior, especially the Copper Country centered on the Keweenaw Peninsula of far northern Michigan. Ingot copper from the Upper Peninsula's booming mines had found eager customers during the commodity boom that accompanied the Civil War. The Pioneer Line was highly successful in moving passengers in both directions; and the Pewabic, acclaimed as "one of the finest vessels on the lakes", ran in coordination with a sister vessel, the SS Meteor. Both vessels sped through fresh water at what was then a blazing speed of 12 knots. Whenever one vessel was going north, the other would be going south, and their paths typically crossed in northern Lake Huron.

The rendezvous moments of the two vessels were often treated as an event calling for playful salutes and celebrations, and the respective ship's captains developed the custom of running close by each other. One oft-repeated story asserts that it was the custom for a seaman on the northbound vessel to heave a mail sack onto the deck of the southbound vessel; the bag allegedly contained Civil War newspapers that could be sold to news-starved passengers. In any case, the August 9, 1865 rendezvous ended in mishap and tragedy. The Pewabic's helmsman unexpectedly swerved in front of the Meteor which buried its prow deep in the forequarters of her stricken sister ship. The Pewabic, mortally wounded, sank no more than 30–45 minutes after the collision. The site of the collision was six miles off Thunder Bay Island near Alpena. The Meteor was able to save some of the passengers and crew; the lost vessel's passenger manifest, which would have been able to clarify the death roll, went down with the ship.

The Pewabic's wreck was 182 feet (55 m) feet below the water's surface. However, its cargo of 267 tons of solid copper ingots was extensively salvaged in 1917 and 1918 by Benjamin Franklin Leavitt, and again in 1974 by Gregory James Busch. In his World War I-era dives, Leavitt is acclaimed as having pioneered the use of atmospheric diving suits in American waters, having organized a salvage operation, using some of the earliest diving gear — diving helmet and an armored suit while directing dive buckets — which salvaged 350 tons (according to another source) of copper ore from the wreck.

== Wrecksite ==
The wreck of the Pewabic sits in over 160 feet (49 m) of water. The stern and the majority of the hull remain mostly intact. Due to salvage work in the 1860s and 1917 for her copper ingot cargo, the superstructure and the bow are broken up or missing.

Busch and his crew recovered the Pewabic's 2,345-pound (1,064 kg) bow anchor, which was presented to the Besser Museum for Northeast Michigan in December 1974. The Admiralty-pattern anchor was placed on public display as a memento of the lost vessel.

A painting of the Pewabic and Meteor by marine artist and historian Robert McGreevy is at the Thunder Bay National Marine Sanctuary.
