= Andrew Marwede =

American professional disc golfer (born 1996)

Andrew Marwede (born 1996) is an American professional disc golfer from Alpena, Michigan, currently competing on the PDGA National Tour and Disc Golf Pro Tour. He Joined the Professional Disc Golf Association in 2015 and became a professional in 2016.

== Professional career ==
He won his first PDGA A-Tier tournament in 2018 at the Hickory Hills Open, and he is the 2020 Michigan State Disc Golf Champion. He has won 45 tournaments and amassed $66,165 in career earnings. As of August 2021, Marwede ranks eleventh in UDisc's Disc Golf World Rankings. After his strong play during the 2021 season, Marwede made the summer 2021 edition cover of the PDGA's DiscGolfer Magazine.

== College basketball ==
Prior to playing disc golf professionally, Marwede played college basketball for two seasons at Alpena Community College where he played both forward and guard. During the 2015 season, in 25 games played, he averaged 14.8 points per game, 9.4 rebounds per game, 1.7 assists per game, and maintained an 81.9% free throw percentage. After transferring, he graduated from Western Michigan University, in Kalamazoo, Michigan. During the disc golf offseason, he spent time as an assistant basketball coach at Alpena Community College.

== Sponsorship and equipment ==
Marwede is currently a member of team DGA. Additional sponsors include Great Lakes Disc, Squatch, Mitten Bags, and C1 Disc.
