= Fishing tug Katherine V. =

American fishing vessel

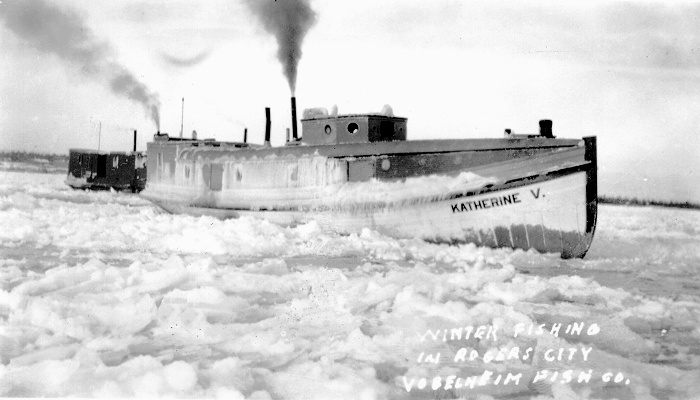

History

United States
- Name: Katherine V.
- Operator: Vogelheim family
- Builder: Henry Vincent, Rogers City, Michigan
- Launched: 1928
- Out of service: 1970
- Status: Out of water museum ship

General characteristics
- Type: Great Lakes Fishing Tug
- Length: 58 ft (18 m)
- Beam: 13 ft (4.0 m)
- Installed power: 75HP-90HP
- Propulsion: oil engine
- Notes: American #228069
- Fishing Tug Katherine V.
- U.S. National Register of Historic Places
- Location within Michigan Location within the United States
- Location: 491 Johnson St., Alpena, Michigan
- Coordinates: 45°4′53″N 83°26′57″W
- Area: less than one acre
- Built: 1928
- Built by: Henry Vincent
- Architectural style: Great Lakes Fishing Tug
- NRHP reference No.: 03000622
- Added to NRHP: July 10, 2003

The Fishing Tug Katherine V., designated US 228069, is a Great Lakes fishing tug. Displayed at the Besser Museum of Northeast Michigan, in Alpena, Michigan, it is believed to be the last intact wooden fishing tug remaining. It was listed on the National Register of Historic Places in 2003.

== History ==
The Katherine V. was built by Henry Vincent of Rogers City, Michigan in 1928 for Charles A. Vogelheim, and named for his wife and daughter. It was operated by the Vogelheim family, but they were not the ones who would fish her. They hired 2 captains who would direct where to put down the nets. In turn, they would each get a quarters pay. They would continue to fish her until around 1970. In 1973, the Vogelheims sold it to be converted into a yacht. The conversion was never done, and the Vogelheim family regained ownership in 1977.

It remained at the fish docks in Rogers City until 2001, when the Vogelheims donated the fishing vessel to the Besser Museum. The museum moved the tug to its property with the intention of restoring it, and the tug was listed on the National Register of Historic Places in 2003. However, no restoration was started until 2013, when the museum started work on a new exhibit about Great Lakes fisheries heritage. Restoration was completed in 2019 and she is now available to the public to walk on its exterior. However, the inside is only open to the public at special events held by the museum.

The vessel is one of about 900 boats that were in the Great Lakes gill net fishing fleet. She is unique in that she spent her entire fishing career in Lake Huron waters off the northeastern Lower peninsula. It has been noted that, "The Katherine V is the last remaining example of the large, wooden fish tugs that once plied the waters of Lake Huron on both the Canadian and American sides of the lake. She is also a splendid example of wooden ship building methods and skills that were once common among the craftsmen of this region."

The vessel is said to be emblematic of Great Lakes fisheries heritage, highlighting 'social, ecological and technical changes that occurred within the fishery and across the Great Lakes region during the early part of the 20th century." in 2003, she was donated and brought to the Besser Museum.

In 1931, the Katherine V. came to the assistance of another fishing tug, The Tramp, which became locked in ice that was 20 feet (6.1 m) thick. "The diligent crew worked tirelessly to free the vessel, but it still took seven days to break free. The Katherine V. and Tramp resumed their plans to catch fish, but the duo eventually had to return. Rather than risk becoming stuck again, the crews mutually agreed to wait until the ice would part. The two vessels waited for two weeks until they could return. The boats reached nearly ¾ of a mile from shore, but the ice ahead of them was impenetrable. Both vessels left a watchman on duty at night in case the wind decided to change course."

== Description ==
The Katherine V is 58 feet (18 m) long and 13 feet (4.0 m) wide. It is equipped with a 75-90 hp. Kahlenberg oil engine. It is constructed of cypress and oak beams. The deck and hull have been ironed over. Her hull is constructed of white oak, northern white cedar and cypress. She was clad in steel and aluminum to aid in winter fishing.
