= Alpena Mall =

Abandoned shopping mall in Alpena Township, Michigan, United States

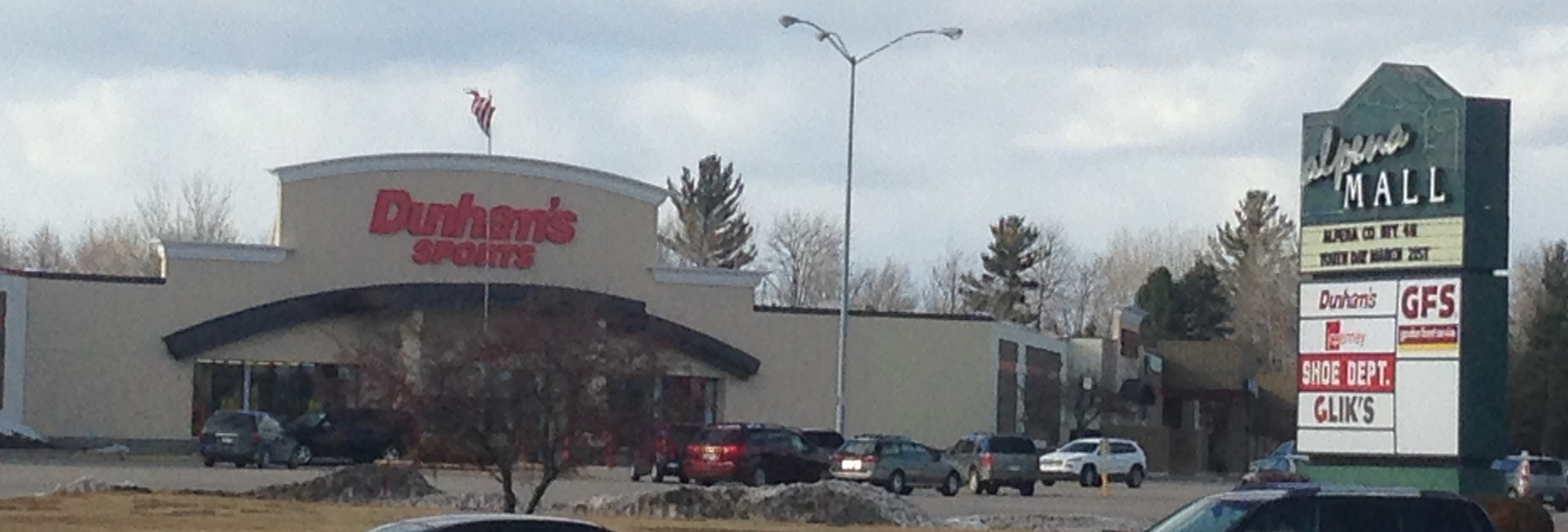
- Alpena Mall in 2015
- Location: Alpena Township, Michigan, USA
- Coordinates: 45.04476°N 83.45927°W
- Address: 2380 US 23 South
- Opened: 1980
- Closed: December 2022
- Developer: Schostak Brothers
- Owner: I2P
- Num. of stores: approx. 30 at peak
- Num. of anchor tenants: 3
- Floor area: 182,975 square feet (16,998.9 m^{2})
- Floors: 1
- Website: alpenamall.com

Alpena Mall is an abandoned enclosed shopping mall located in Alpena Township, Michigan, United States. It was the only enclosed mall in Northeast Michigan. Although the mall itself is closed, its anchor tenants Gordon Food Service and Dunham's Sports continue to operate.

== History ==
The mall originally featured JCPenney and Kmart, which moved across the street in the late 1990s. The Kmart space is now occupied by Dunham's and Gordon Food Service. Shoe Dept. opened a store at the mall in 2014.

In December 2018, the mall was purchased by Molla Investments.

On June 4, 2020, JCPenney announced that it would be closing around October 2020 as part of the company's plan to close 154 stores nationwide. After JCPenney closed, GFS and Dunham's Sports were the only anchor stores left.

In late 2020, I2P purchased the mall and announced plans to redevelop it into a manufacturing center. Due to this, throughout late 2020 and early 2021, many of the mall's stores relocated to downtown Alpena, bringing the mall's store count from approximately 20 to only 9.

According to The Alpena News, the mall closed in December 2022. The mall's huge collection of Christmas trees and decorations was gifted to the Besser Museum, which now uses them in their holiday exhibit. Despite the closure of the mall interior, Dunham's Sports, Shoe Dept., and Gordon Food Service remain open.
