= Jesse Besser =

American inventor

Jesse Besser (1882 – May 3, 1970) was an inventor and manufacturer from Alpena in the U.S. state of Michigan. He is best known for inventing, and supervising a series of improvements to, a tamping machine used to rapidly press wet, flexible concrete into blocks, thereby making possible a new generation of applications in masonry construction. For decades, Besser block was a worldwide standard term for masonry construction blocks and is still a generic term in Australia. The Alpena-based Besser Company, which Jesse Besser ran for many decades, manufactured these machines and made a fortune for him and his family. Concrete blocks made with Besser machines became a feature of worldwide construction solutions in World War II and following years. Commencing in 1964, Besser turned over part of his assets to the newly founded Jesse Besser Museum, now known as the Besser Museum for Northeast Michigan, as an endowment.

== Biography ==
Jesse Besser was born in metropolitan Buffalo, New York in 1882; his parents and he moved when he was one year old, to Montmorency County, Michigan in what was then the northern American frontier. Besser grew up on the periphery of the lumber business, helping his father Herman operate a small mill that shaved timber scantlings into shingles and barrel staves. As old-growth timber vanished from northeastern Michigan, the senior Besser parlayed his assets into a substantial equity share in a local cement mill.

After leaving high school, young Besser quickly acquired a working knowledge of cement, concrete, and what were then the un-perfected and balky hand-operated machines used to tamp wet, flexible concrete into solid shapes. He invented his first improvements to his mill shop's concrete-block tamper in 1904, and further improvements created a machine capable of making 200 rectangular blocks during what was then a standard 10-hour working day. Repeatedly applying simple principles of power transport and automation, Jesse Besser and his engineering aides steadily improved their concrete-block-producing tamper machines. By 1954, fifty years after the 1904 device, the machines of the Besser Company's lineup could produce 10,000 blocks during a 10-hour period — a productivity improvement of 8.1% per year.

Jesse Besser retired from his management roles during a two-year period, 1964‍–‍65. In 1964, the Besser Foundation granted an endowment to what was then the Jesse Besser Museum to construct a general-purpose community museum for the eastern half of Northern Michigan. Besser bequeathed his remaining management roles in the Besser Company to nephew Philip Park in 1965, and he died on May 3, 1970.
