= Howard Besser =

American archivist

Academic work
- Main interests: digital preservation, Information Commons

Howard Besser (born c. 1952) is a scholar of digital preservation, digital libraries, and preservation of film and video. He is Professor of Cinema Studies and the founding director of the NYU Moving Image Archiving and Preservation Program ("MIAP"), a graduate program in the Tisch School. Besser also worked as a Senior Scientist at New York University's Digital Library Initiative. He conducted extensive research in image databases, multimedia operation, digital library, and social and cultural influence of the latest Information Technology. Besser is a prolific writer and speaker, and has consulted with many governments, educational institutions, and arts agencies on digital preservation matters. Besser researched libraries' new technology, archives, and museums. Besser has been actively contributing at the international level to build metadata and upgrade the quality of the cultural heritage community. He predominantly, focused on image and multimedia databases; digital library aspects (related to quality, intellectual property, and longevity); cultural and societal impacts of information technology, and developing new teaching methods through technology such as web-based instructions and distance learning. Besser was closely involved in development of the Dublin Core and the Metadata Encoding and Transmission Standard (METS), international standards within librarianship.

== Biography ==
Besser grew up in the San Francisco Bay Area and earned a Bachelor's degree in 1976 from the University of California, Berkeley. He studied film in Paris at the Centre Internationale d'Études des Cinema. He earned a Master's and PhD in Library Science in 1977 and 1988 respectively, both from UC Berkeley.

Rick Prelinger (Prelinger Archives) and Howard Besser (NYU professor of cinema studies) answer the questions "What is an orphan film?" and "What is the Orphan Film Symposium?" (Recorded at the University of South Carolina, March 2006) running time 2:55

Besser was on the faculty of UC Berkeley's School of Information for a number of years, before accepting a position as professor at UCLA's School of Education and Information Studies in 1999. The Department of Information Technology at the University of California began developing a project of the high-standard digital image. The project developers believed that the software (Image Query) served as a breakthrough in a multi-user digital image database. The user interface technology known as X Window System was the main feature of Image Query. The system could include various features such as point and click searching, GUI (Graphical user interface), and thumbnail. Drawing up this work, Besser worked on a major project named The Museum Site Licensing Project (MESL). It was a significant initiative to collect images alongside metadata from numerous cultural institutes and transformed them into digital technology for the users of university campus networks. The project collaborated with seven universities, the Library of Congress, and six museums. The project delivered a dataset of almost ten thousand digital images and related metadata for classroom use. The research analyzed the requirements of implementors for working on digital imaging projects in universities.

He retired from UCLA, becoming a Professor Emeritas there, in order to found the MIAP program at New York University in 2004. He also taught at the University of Michigan's School of Information and at the University of Pittsburgh.

Besser focused on integrating critical theory concepts and design issues. He worked for several years to develop and test new ways for incorporating technology in teaching. For the past twenty seven years, he has been using the internet as a significant component of instructional assistance, saving teaching materials and curriculum on the World Wide Web.

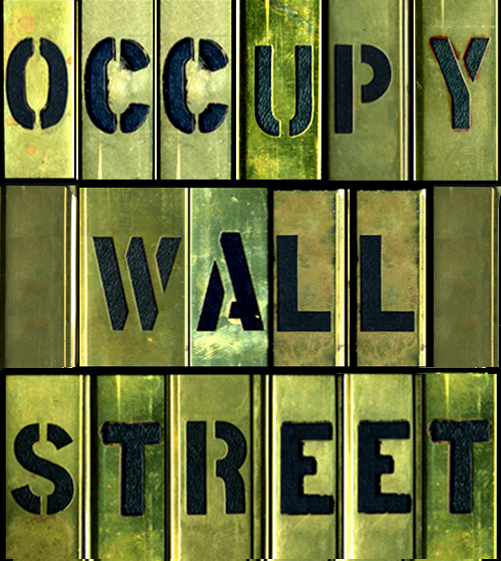
artwork for Occupy Wall Street movement

=== Contributions to Occupy Movement ===
One of Besser's many projects was in 2011 when he organized a group of librarians called the Activist Archivists who would record and document the famous Occupy Movement. Graduates and students of the Moving Image Archives and Preservation Program acknowledged the importance of the Occupy Wall Street movement alongside the significance of the digital artifacts associated with the movement. Under Besser's leadership, they developed the Activist Archivists and began planning on preserving the content. The fundamental objective of this effort was to convey the digital preservation information effectively and concisely. Besser's team articulated essential pieces of text and published them on postcards; they distributed those cards to the individuals in public places. In this way, they played their role in raising awareness about digital technology (Digital humanities). For example, "Why Archive" postcards contained information about accountability and archives as proof to hold people in power accountable. The graduates and experts along with Besser, designed a crash course about digital preservations, supported by videos and links to materials for using video in the long term. Similarly, the course taught students the best practices that video activists can employ.

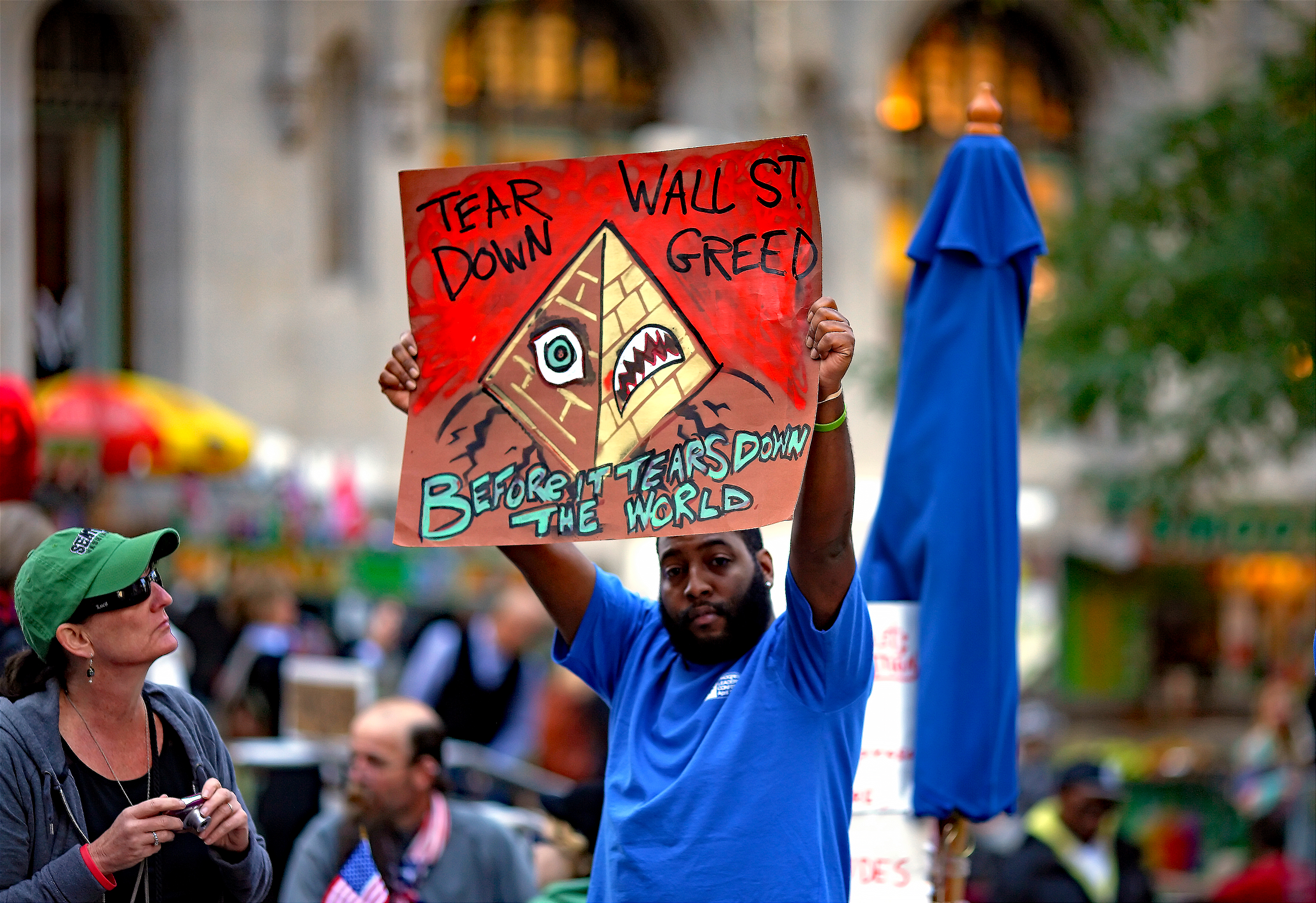
Man protesting with sign at Occupy Wall Street. 17 October 2011

Additionally, the course material included the details of legal restrictions in seeking permission from the people to record their activities; it also dealt with the copyright policy. The objective was to save the creators' original work from being stolen. The course emphasized the idea of obtaining a license that will enable the source to store the content and make it accessible for the long term. The Occupy movement had been recorded since its beginning in September 2011; in that regard, thousands of photos were taken, hundreds of people tweeted about it, and several recordings were available. However, creators expressed concern about saving this digital material. At the time of the emergence of Activist Archivists, some suspicion surfaced. The movement had developed the archives of the working class, but it aimed to save the content of artifacts. For example, the symbols carried by the protestors.

The archivists worked alongside New York University Tamiment Library to crowd-source the range of videos obtained from YouTube, relevant to the movement. Some categories were developed like Celebrity Visits and "Clashes with Police." The archivists asked movement members to complete an online form pointing at the five most interesting videos. According to Besser, "Tags (Unicode block)" was where metadata started. Plenty of educational material was made available about technical metadata with different illustrations. To facilitate users, Besser worked with his team to develop an app for users' phones to fill the form, which could instantly record a things such as date, time, and Global Positioning System location and update it with video or photo.

Besser has always supported the idea of collection metadata right from the beginning when digital content was created. He believed that getting the community members to develop metadata for sharing files over the internet may cause some components to be removed. The problem may arise at the time of downloading or uploading the files to the specific websites. Practically, with the app, Besser attempted to foster effective metadata practices within the community. According to Besser, the process needs automation. For institutions, ingestion of substantial amounts of digital work will be unlikely for memory institutions. Likewise, cultural institutions would not have the resources to integrate metadata and to collect enormous amounts of work added by the thousands of people. The experiences of Archive Activists with the occupy movement depicts the situation of archivists in the future. The archivists will experience a large quantity of material contributed by users.

The archivists are likely to encounter inconsistency in data, and there will be a lack of guiding material with the organizational record. The efforts of Archivists Activists in the context of the Occupy movement describe the significance of the involvement of archivists in the initial phase of the event. The archivists are the ones who uses their skills to impact the behavior of the content creator. Besser focuses on the outreach of the Activists Archivists; he indicated that his team members have taken up the small things, and they all worked with the locals. Besser also sponsored a session of the Association of Moving Image Archivists in December 2012 in which people discussed various dimensions of community archiving. Besser's team approached different locations that had collections and the team has attempted to create more sustainability in the field.

Besser is well known for his habit of wearing only t-shirts, and for maintaining a t-shirt database. A number of his classes used the t-shirt database as a cataloging and metadata practicum, cataloging t-shirts into the database with appropriate metadata.

== Awards ==
- 1995, Outstanding Information Studies Teacher of the Year, American Society for Information Science
- 2009, "Pioneers of Digital Preservation", Library of Congress

== Works ==
- Besser, Howard; Trant, Jennifer (1995). Introduction to imaging: issues in constructing an image database. California: The Getty Art History Information Program. ISBN 0892363614. OCLC 807013081.

== See also ==
- List of archivists
