= Gordon Food Service =

American catering company

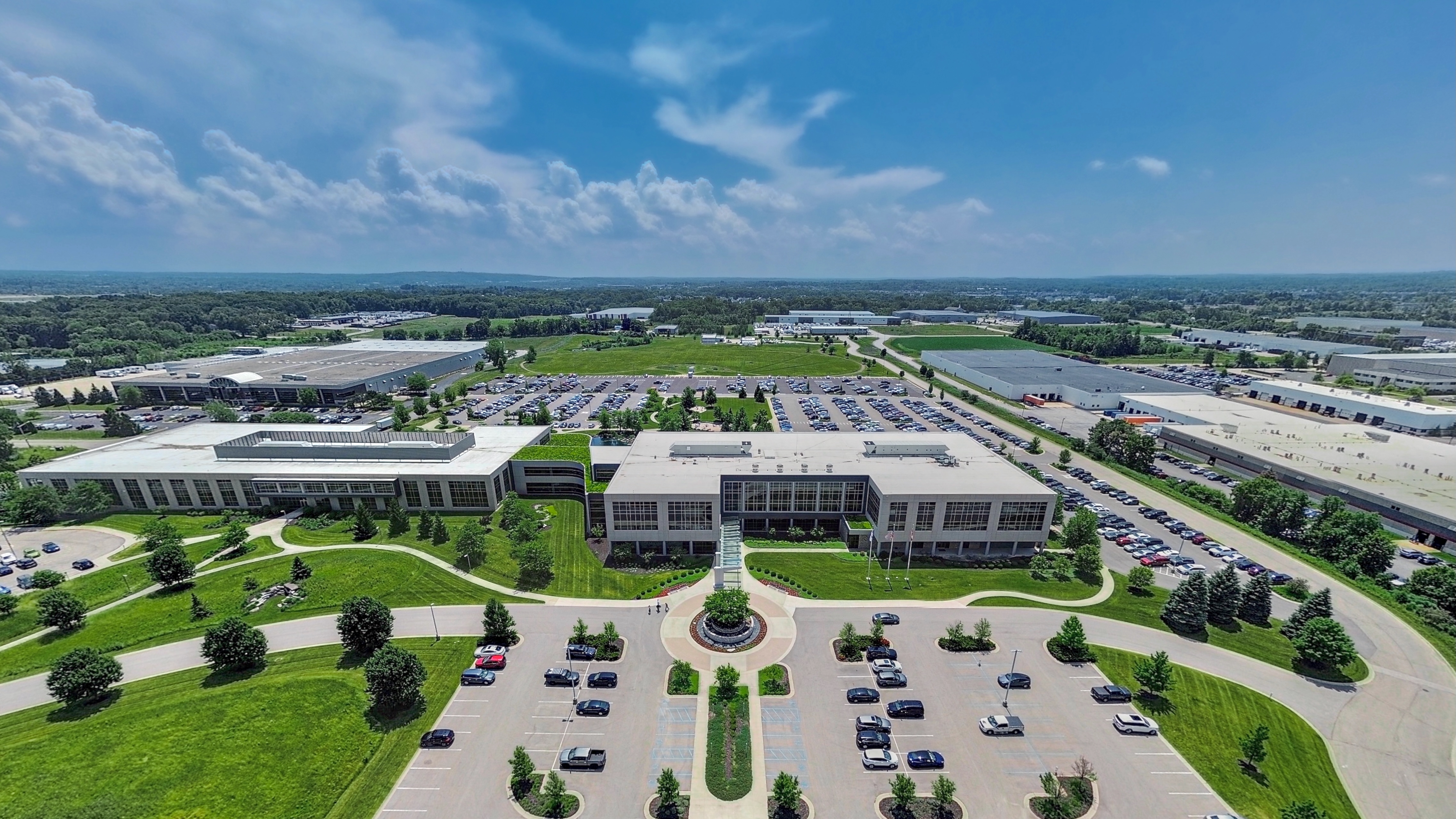
- Headquarters of Gordon Food Services
- Type: Private
- Industry: Food distribution
- Founded: 1897; 129 years ago
- Headquarters: Wyoming, Michigan
- Key people: Rich Wolowski (CEO)
- Products: Bulk food, delivery
- Revenue: ▲$12.9 billion (2016)
- Number of employees: 20,000
- Website: gfs.com

Gordon Food Service (GFS) is a foodservice distributor based in Wyoming, Michigan serving the Midwest, Northeast, Southeast, and Southwest regions of the United States and coast-to-coast in Canada. It also operates stores in Florida, Georgia, Illinois, Indiana, Iowa, Kentucky, Michigan, Missouri, New York, Ohio, Pennsylvania, Tennessee, Texas, Alabama, and Wisconsin.

According to Forbes, GFS is the 15th-largest privately held company in the United States. Its biggest competitors are US Foods and Sysco.

== History ==
In 1897, Isaac Van Westenbrugge, a 23-year-old Dutch immigrant, started a butter-and-egg delivery service using a horse-drawn cart and $300 borrowed from his brother. In 1916, Ben Gordon joined the company and later married Van Westenbrugge's daughter, Ruth. In 1942, Ben and his brother Frank renamed the company Gordon Food Service. Since then, Gordon Food Service has grown to become the largest privately held and family-managed foodservice distributor in North America. Gordon Food Service serves a wide variety of foodservice companies across industries, ranging from restaurants, to healthcare, education, and more.

GFS purchased the Market Day school fundraising company in 2013 before shutting it down two years later.

In early March 2024, Gordon Food Service along with Florida Blue Foundation, and AdventHealth became partners and founding members of the Culinary Health Institute; which was being built on the 4 Roots Farm Campus in Orlando, Florida, by John Rivers' founder of 4 Rivers Smokehouse.

== Wholesale distribution ==
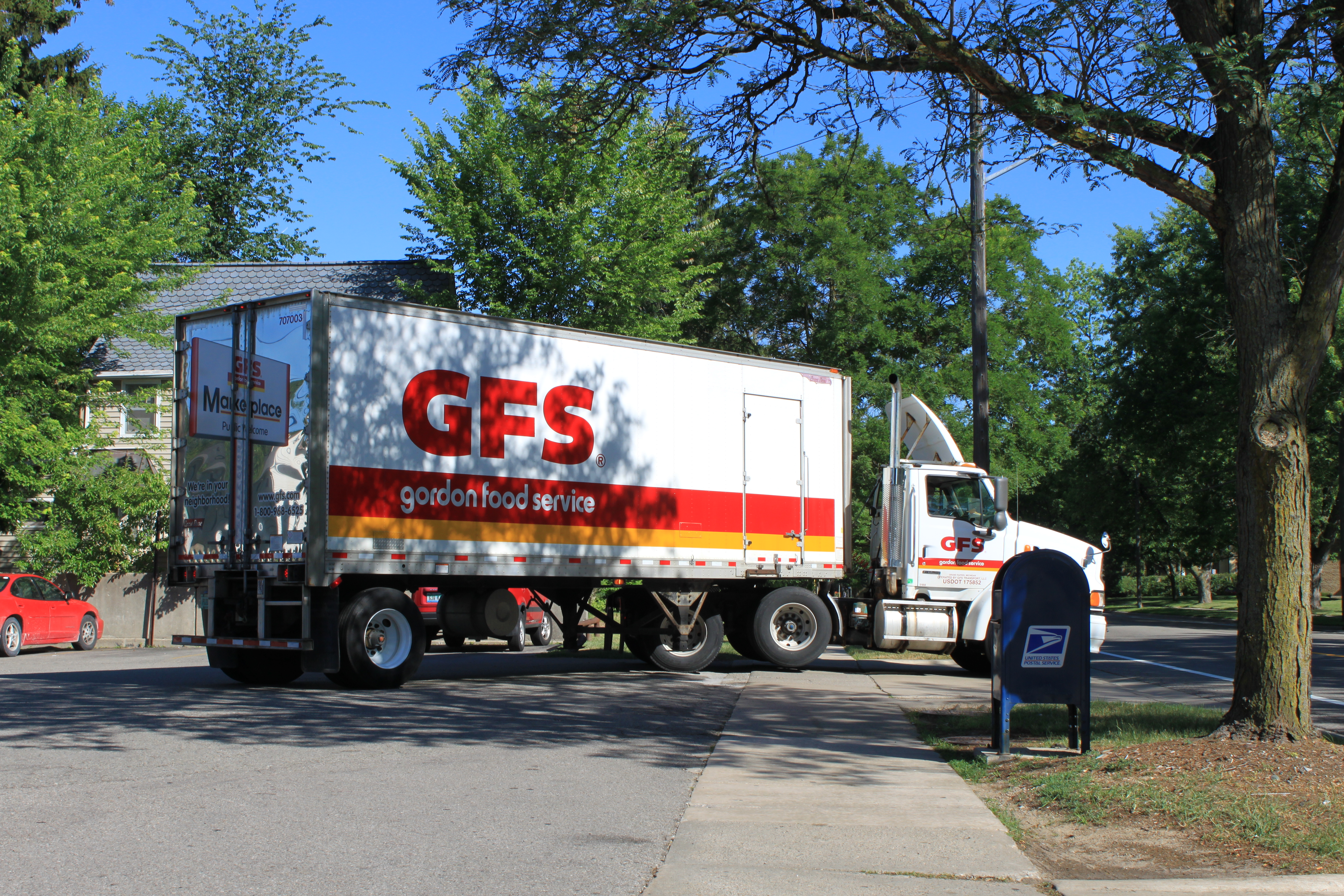
GFS delivery truck, Ann Arbor, Michigan

Gordon Food Service has 14 distribution centers in the U.S., located in Aberdeen, Maryland; Brighton, Michigan; Concord, North Carolina; Coppell, Texas; Houston, Texas; Imperial, Pennsylvania; Kenosha, Wisconsin; Lithia Springs, Georgia; Miami, Florida; Plant City, Florida; Shepherdsville, Kentucky; Springfield, Ohio; Taunton, Massachusetts; and Wyoming, Michigan.

In 1996, the company began a series of acquisitions in Canada, forming Gordon Food Service Canada. It now has nine distribution centers in Canada, located in Amherst, Nova Scotia; Boucherville, Quebec; Delta, British Columbia; Edmonton, Alberta; Milton, Ontario; Quebec City, Quebec; Rocky View County, Alberta, Winnipeg, Manitoba, and Ajax, Ontario.

Gordon Food Service delivers products via truck to more than 100,000 customers, including independent restaurants, long-term care facilities, hospitals, schools, colleges, and regional and national chain restaurants.

== Stores ==
Gordon Food Service opened its first cash and carry store in 1979. These stores were renamed GFS Marketplace in 1992 and rebranded to Gordon Food Service Store in 2014. As of 2025, GFS operates more than 175 stores across Florida, Georgia, Illinois, Indiana, Iowa, Kentucky, Michigan, Missouri, New York, Ohio, Pennsylvania, Tennessee, Texas and Wisconsin. The company began renovating many stores in 2019.
