= Alpena, Michigan =

- City
- City of Alpena
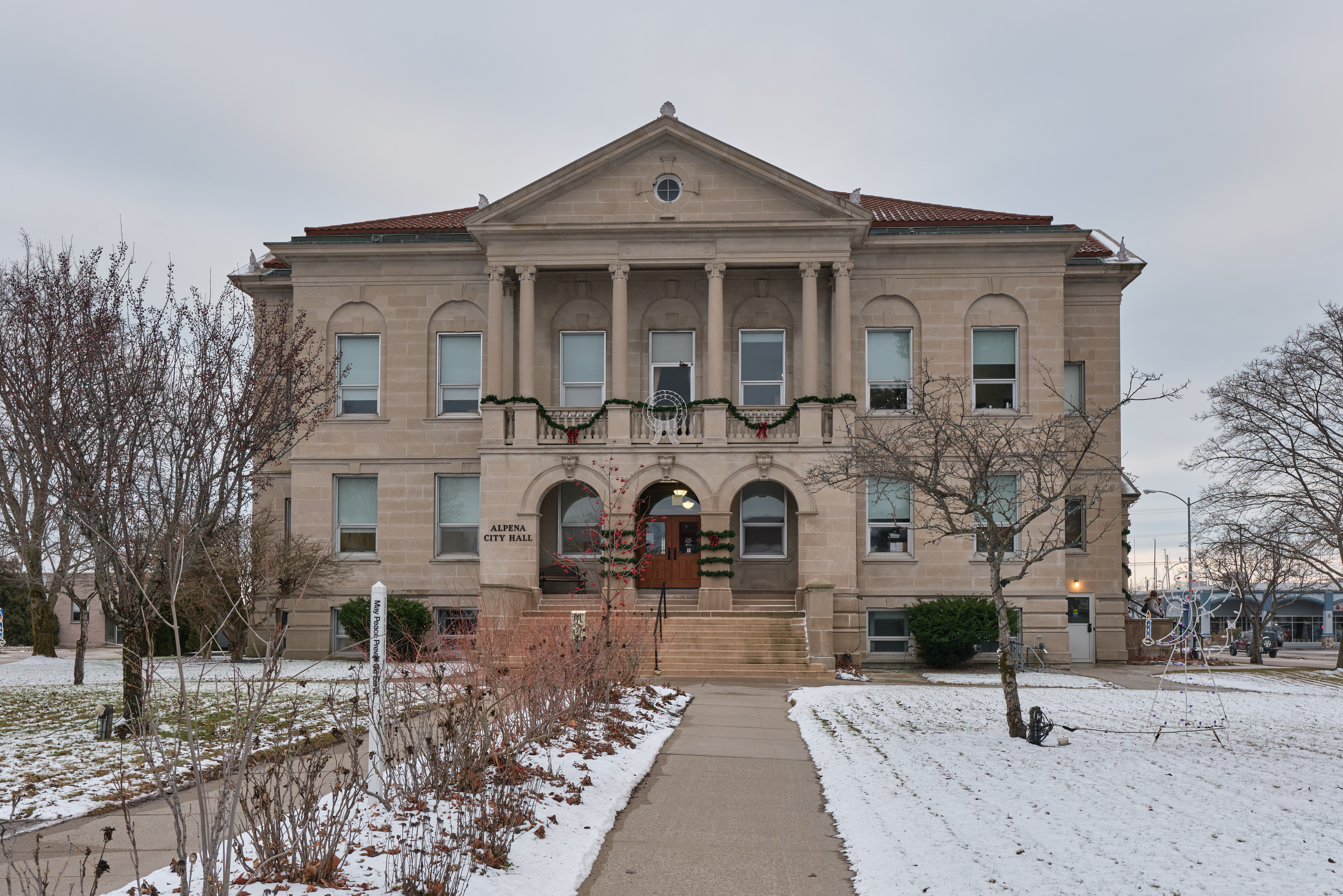
- Alpena City Hall

- Flag
- Nickname: "Sanctuary of the Great Lakes"
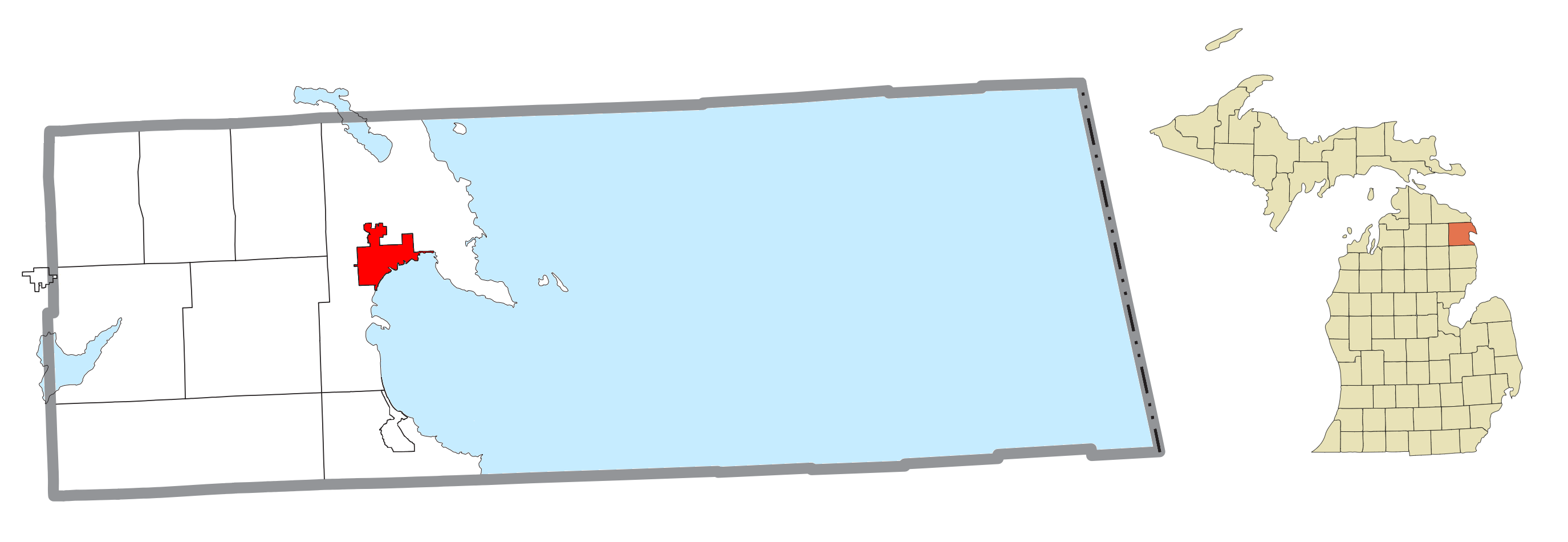
- Location within Alpena County

- Location within the state of Michigan
- Coordinates: 45°03′42″N 83°25′58″W
- Country: United States
- State: Michigan
- County: Alpena
- Settled: 1835
- Founded: 1840
- Incorporated: 1871

Government
  - Type: Mayor–council
  - Mayor: Cindy Johnson
  - Mayor pro tem: Michael Nowak
  - Manager: Rachel Smolinski

Area
  - Total: 8.86 sq mi (22.94 km^{2})
  - Land: 8.17 sq mi (21.17 km^{2})
  - Water: 0.68 sq mi (1.77 km^{2})
- Elevation: 590 ft (180 m)

Population (2020)
  - Total: 10,197
  - Density: 1,247.8/sq mi (481.78/km^{2})
- Demonym: "Alpenan(s)"
- Time zone: UTC-5 (EST)
  - Summer (DST): UTC-4 (EDT)
- ZIP code(s): 49707
- Area code: 989
- FIPS code: 26-01740
- GNIS feature ID: 0620017
- Website: www.alpena.mi.us

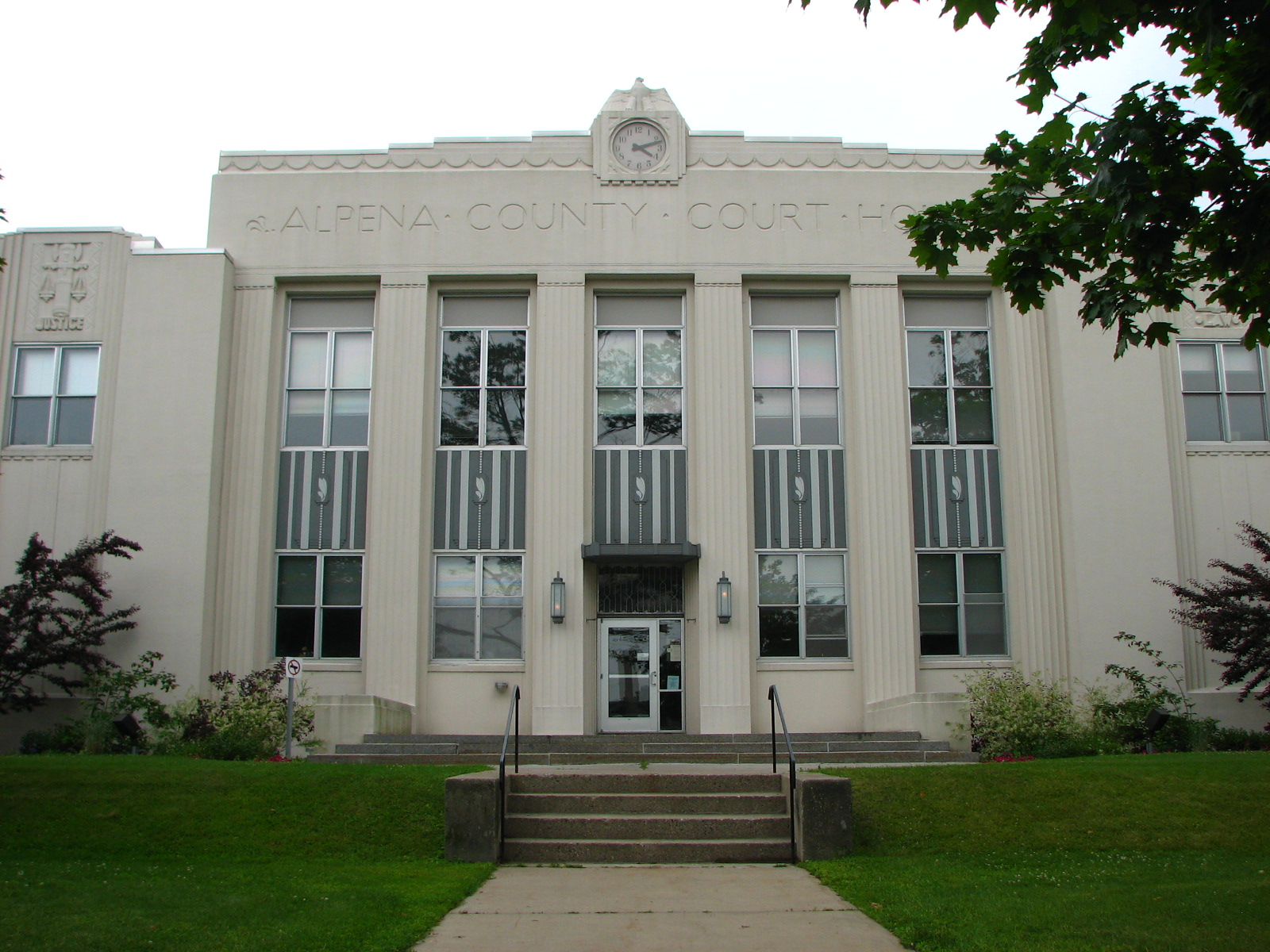
Alpena County Courthouse in Alpena

Alpena (/ælˈpiːnə/ al-PEE-nə) is the only city in and the county seat of Alpena County, Michigan, United States. The population was 10,197 at the 2020 census, making it the third most populated city in the Northern Michigan region, after Traverse City and Cadillac. The city is surrounded by Alpena Township, but the two are administered autonomously. It is the core city of the Alpena micropolitan statistical area, which encompasses all of Alpena County and had a total population of 28,907 at the 2020 census.

Alpena is located at the head of Thunder Bay, a bay of Lake Huron. Offshore of Alpena is the Thunder Bay National Marine Sanctuary, which protects an estimated 116 historically significant shipwrecks. Alpena is the second-largest American city on Lake Huron, behind Port Huron.

== History ==
The Alpena area is home to the Ojibwe, Ottawa, and Potawatomi people. These people groups inhabit the area surrounding the Great Lakes, including Michigan. The Thunder Bay Band of Chippewa and Ottawa merged with the Mackinac Bands of Chippewa and Ottawa Indians in the mid-1800s under Chief Way-ge-maw-waw-be.

Alpena County was originally set off from Michilimackinac County as Anamickee County founded in 1840, which in 1843 was changed to Alpena, a pseudo-Native American word — a neologism coined by Henry Schoolcraft, meaning something like "a good partridge country." This was part of a much larger effort to rename a great many of the Michigan counties at the time.

The first European settler at modern-day Alpena was W.F. Cullings, a fisherman in 1835. In 1856, George W. Fletcher and three others from Detroit platted a village by the name of Fremont, after John C. Frémont. The community was briefly renamed Thunder Bay in 1857 before being renamed again to Alpena in 1871. The city of Alpena was officially incorporated by Michigan State Legislature on March 29, 1871.

Most of the city was lost in the Great Michigan Fire of 1871. Less than one year later, on July 12, 1872, Alpena was hit by another fire, the largest in its history, which destroyed 15 acres (6.1 ha) of homes and businesses for a total amount of 65 buildings. The blaze started in a barn and lasted for two hours, killing at least four people and causing at least $180,000 (equivalent to $4,840,000 in 2025) in damages. Alpena was again hit by a disastrous fire on July 11, 1888. In the early 1910s a failed attempt was led by the Alpena Motor Car Company to turn the city into "Automobile City" and compete with Detroit.

In 1920 the population of the city was 11,101, and in 1927 the trade through the city's port was valued over 8 million dollars, and the output of the 24 factories at a little under another 8 million.

The city has a number of notable buildings, including the Art deco Alpena County Courthouse, the I.O.O.F. Centennial Building, and Temple Beth El, one of the oldest synagogues in the United States. (Note: In Michigan, it is the only synagogue in the northeast (Northern Michigan) of the Lower Peninsula. It is closely associated with the Hebrew Benevolent Society Cemetery.)

=== Historical markers ===
There are seven recognized historical markers in the city:

- Alpena City Hall
- Alpena County Courthouse
- The Daniel Carter Family, Alpena's first settlers.
- First Congregational Church
- Monarch Mill
- St. Bernard Catholic Church
- World's Largest Cement Plant (see Lafarge)

== Geography ==
According to the United States Census Bureau, the city has a total area of 9.23 square miles (23.91 km^{2}), of which, 8.54 square miles (22.12 km^{2}) of it is land and 0.69 square miles (1.79 km^{2}) (7.48%) is water. The city is on the shore of Lake Huron's Thunder Bay, with Alpena Township surrounding it on land.

=== Climate ===
Alpena has a humid continental climate (Dfb) with warm summers along with cool nights, moderated by nearby Lake Huron and cold, snowy winters with annual snowfall averaging 84 inches (210 cm).

Climate data for Alpena County Regional Airport, Michigan (1991–2020 normals, extremes 1916–present)
Month	Jan	Feb	Mar	Apr	May	Jun	Jul	Aug	Sep	Oct	Nov	Dec	Year
Record high °F (°C)	62 (17)	65 (18)	87 (31)	90 (32)	94 (34)	104 (40)	106 (41)	102 (39)	99 (37)	90 (32)	77 (25)	65 (18)	106 (41)
Mean maximum °F (°C)	45 (7)	49 (9)	62 (17)	75 (24)	86 (30)	92 (33)	92 (33)	91 (33)	86 (30)	79 (26)	62 (17)	50 (10)	95 (35)
Mean daily maximum °F (°C)	28.1 (−2.2)	30.2 (−1.0)	38.4 (3.6)	52.2 (11.2)	65.8 (18.8)	75.9 (24.4)	80.5 (26.9)	78.8 (26.0)	71.0 (21.7)	57.6 (14.2)	44.6 (7.0)	33.6 (0.9)	54.8 (12.7)
Daily mean °F (°C)	20.0 (−6.7)	20.7 (−6.3)	29.3 (−1.5)	41.2 (5.1)	53.4 (11.9)	63.2 (17.3)	68.2 (20.1)	66.6 (19.2)	59.0 (15.0)	47.4 (8.6)	36.6 (2.6)	26.6 (−3.0)	44.4 (6.9)
Mean daily minimum °F (°C)	11.9 (−11.2)	11.2 (−11.6)	19.1 (−7.2)	30.2 (−1.0)	40.9 (4.9)	50.4 (10.2)	55.9 (13.3)	54.5 (12.5)	47.0 (8.3)	37.2 (2.9)	28.6 (−1.9)	19.6 (−6.9)	33.9 (1.1)
Mean minimum °F (°C)	−10 (−23)	−11 (−24)	−4 (−20)	17 (−8)	28 (−2)	37 (3)	44 (7)	42 (6)	32 (0)	23 (−5)	12 (−11)	−1 (−18)	−15 (−26)
Record low °F (°C)	−28 (−33)	−37 (−38)	−27 (−33)	−7 (−22)	20 (−7)	27 (−3)	34 (1)	29 (−2)	23 (−5)	12 (−11)	−6 (−21)	−27 (−33)	−37 (−38)
Average precipitation inches (mm)	1.81 (46)	1.52 (39)	1.81 (46)	2.93 (74)	2.78 (71)	2.74 (70)	3.20 (81)	3.09 (78)	2.84 (72)	3.01 (76)	2.07 (53)	1.87 (47)	29.67 (754)
Average snowfall inches (cm)	19.3 (49)	17.0 (43)	10.6 (27)	6.6 (17)	0.2 (0.51)	0.0 (0.0)	0.0 (0.0)	0.0 (0.0)	0.0 (0.0)	0.4 (1.0)	6.6 (17)	16.9 (43)	77.6 (197)
Average precipitation days (≥ 0.01 in)	15.6	11.8	11.0	11.5	11.7	10.4	10.9	9.6	11.2	13.9	13.8	14.0	145.4
Average snowy days (≥ 0.1 in)	15.1	12.5	7.1	3.2	0.2	0.0	0.0	0.0	0.0	0.4	5.9	11.6	56.0
Average relative humidity (%)	76.2	73.3	71.6	66.8	66.0	70.5	71.0	76.1	78.5	76.4	78.2	79.6	73.7
Average dew point °F (°C)	12.4 (−10.9)	11.8 (−11.2)	19.9 (−6.7)	29.3 (−1.5)	39.6 (4.2)	50.5 (10.3)	56.7 (13.7)	56.3 (13.5)	49.6 (9.8)	38.7 (3.7)	28.8 (−1.8)	19.0 (−7.2)	34.4 (1.3)
Mean monthly sunshine hours	108.8	133.5	195.5	222.9	279.5	294.6	316.9	257.1	193.9	143.5	82.8	73.9	2,302.9
Percentage possible sunshine	38	46	53	55	61	63	67	59	52	42	29	27	52
Source: NOAA (relative humidity, dew point, and sun 1961–1990)

Climate data for Alpena, Michigan (Water Treatment Plant near downtown), 1991–2020 normals, extremes 1873–present
Month	Jan	Feb	Mar	Apr	May	Jun	Jul	Aug	Sep	Oct	Nov	Dec	Year
Record high °F (°C)	62 (17)	62 (17)	81 (27)	88 (31)	95 (35)	100 (38)	104 (40)	100 (38)	99 (37)	87 (31)	77 (25)	65 (18)	104 (40)
Mean daily maximum °F (°C)	27.1 (−2.7)	28.6 (−1.9)	36.8 (2.7)	48.4 (9.1)	60.8 (16.0)	71.0 (21.7)	77.1 (25.1)	76.2 (24.6)	68.9 (20.5)	55.9 (13.3)	43.0 (6.1)	32.8 (0.4)	52.2 (11.2)
Daily mean °F (°C)	20.2 (−6.6)	20.6 (−6.3)	28.8 (−1.8)	40.3 (4.6)	51.9 (11.1)	62.4 (16.9)	68.3 (20.2)	67.2 (19.6)	59.8 (15.4)	47.7 (8.7)	36.4 (2.4)	26.9 (−2.8)	44.2 (6.8)
Mean daily minimum °F (°C)	13.4 (−10.3)	12.7 (−10.7)	20.8 (−6.2)	32.1 (0.1)	43.1 (6.2)	53.7 (12.1)	59.4 (15.2)	58.1 (14.5)	50.7 (10.4)	39.6 (4.2)	29.9 (−1.2)	20.9 (−6.2)	36.2 (2.3)
Record low °F (°C)	−27 (−33)	−28 (−33)	−19 (−28)	−2 (−19)	21 (−6)	34 (1)	33 (1)	36 (2)	25 (−4)	15 (−9)	−4 (−20)	−15 (−26)	−28 (−33)
Average precipitation inches (mm)	2.19 (56)	1.70 (43)	1.81 (46)	3.11 (79)	3.17 (81)	2.72 (69)	3.29 (84)	3.45 (88)	2.94 (75)	3.24 (82)	2.27 (58)	2.05 (52)	31.94 (811)
Average snowfall inches (cm)	15.6 (40)	14.4 (37)	6.2 (16)	3.5 (8.9)	0.0 (0.0)	0.0 (0.0)	0.0 (0.0)	0.0 (0.0)	0.0 (0.0)	0.1 (0.25)	3.0 (7.6)	16.6 (42)	59.4 (151)
Average precipitation days (≥ 0.01 in)	19.8	15.5	13.0	13.7	14.1	12.2	12.4	12.0	12.9	16.6	16.1	17.3	175.6
Average snowy days (≥ 0.1 in)	9.1	6.8	3.7	1.3	0.1	0.0	0.0	0.0	0.0	0.2	1.7	6.9	29.8
Source: NOAA

== Demographics ==
Historical population
Census	Pop.	Note	%±
1880	6,153		—
1890	11,283		83.4%
1900	11,802		4.6%
1910	12,706		7.7%
1920	11,101		−12.6%
1930	12,166		9.6%
1940	12,808		5.3%
1950	13,135		2.6%
1960	14,682		11.8%
1970	13,805		−6.0%
1980	12,214		−11.5%
1990	11,354		−7.0%
2000	11,304		−0.4%
2010	10,483		−7.3%
2020	10,197		−2.7%

=== 2020 census ===
As of the 2020 census, Alpena had a population of 10,197. The median age was 45.4 years. 18.3% of residents were under the age of 18 and 23.7% of residents were 65 years of age or older. For every 100 females there were 90.7 males, and for every 100 females age 18 and over there were 88.0 males age 18 and over.

99.9% of residents lived in urban areas, while 0.1% lived in rural areas.

There were 4,787 households in Alpena, of which 21.7% had children under the age of 18 living in them. Of all households, 34.2% were married-couple households, 22.1% were households with a male householder and no spouse or partner present, and 35.3% were households with a female householder and no spouse or partner present. About 41.4% of all households were made up of individuals and 19.2% had someone living alone who was 65 years of age or older.

There were 5,360 housing units, of which 10.7% were vacant. The homeowner vacancy rate was 1.8% and the rental vacancy rate was 11.5%.

Racial composition as of the 2020 census
Race	Number	Percent
White	9,460	92.8%
Black or African American	57	0.6%
American Indian and Alaska Native	53	0.5%
Asian	47	0.5%
Native Hawaiian and Other Pacific Islander	10	0.1%
Some other race	65	0.6%
Two or more races	505	5.0%
Hispanic or Latino (of any race)	211	2.1%

=== 2010 census ===
As of the census of 2010, there were 10,483 people, 4,734 households, and 2,565 families residing in the city. The population density was 1,227.5 inhabitants per square mile (473.9/km^{2}). There were 5,278 housing units at an average density of 618.0 per square mile (238.6/km^{2}). The racial makeup of the city was 96.8% White, 0.5% African American, 0.4% Native American, 0.7% Asian, 0.1% Pacific Islander, 0.1% from other races, and 1.4% from two or more races. Hispanic or Latino of any race were 1.0% of the population.

There were 4,734 households, of which 24.8% had children under the age of 18 living with them, 38.3% were married couples living together, 12.2% had a female householder with no husband present, 3.6% had a male householder with no wife present, and 45.8% were non-families. 39.4% of all households were made up of individuals, and 17.2% had someone living alone who was 65 years of age or older. The average household size was 2.13 and the average family size was 2.84.

The median age in the city was 42.5 years. 20.7% of residents were under the age of 18; 9.4% were between the ages of 18 and 24; 22.7% were from 25 to 44; 27.9% were from 45 to 64; and 19.4% were 65 years of age or older. The gender makeup of the city was 47.7% male and 52.3% female.

=== 2000 census ===
As of the census of 2000, there were 11,304 people, 4,874 households, and 2,865 families residing in the city. The population density was 1,348.9 inhabitants per square mile (520.8/km^{2}). There were 5,200 housing units at an average density of 620.5 per square mile (239.6/km^{2}). The racial makeup of the city was 97.66% White, 0.42% African American, 0.43% Native American, 0.48% Asian, 0.01% Pacific Islander, 0.09% from other races, and 0.91% from two or more races. Hispanic or Latino of any race were 0.59% of the population.

There were 4,874 households, out of which 26.9% had children under the age of 18 living with them, 44.1% were married couples living together, 11.5% had a female householder with no husband present, and 41.2% were non-families. 35.9% of all households were made up of individuals, and 17.9% had someone living alone who was 65 years of age or older. The average household size was 2.24 and the average family size was 2.93.

In the city, the population was spread out, with 23.0% under the age of 18, 9.2% from 18 to 24, 26.5% from 25 to 44, 21.7% from 45 to 64, and 19.6% who were 65 years of age or older. The median age was 40 years. For every 100 females, there were 88.9 males. For every 100 females age 18 and over, there were 85.4 males.

The median income for a household in the city was $30,353, and the median income for a family was $40,056. Males had a median income of $34,534 versus $21,951 for females. The per capita income for the city was $17,476. About 10.4% of families and 13.5% of the population were below the poverty line, including 16.5% of those under age 18 and 6.6% of those age 65 or over.

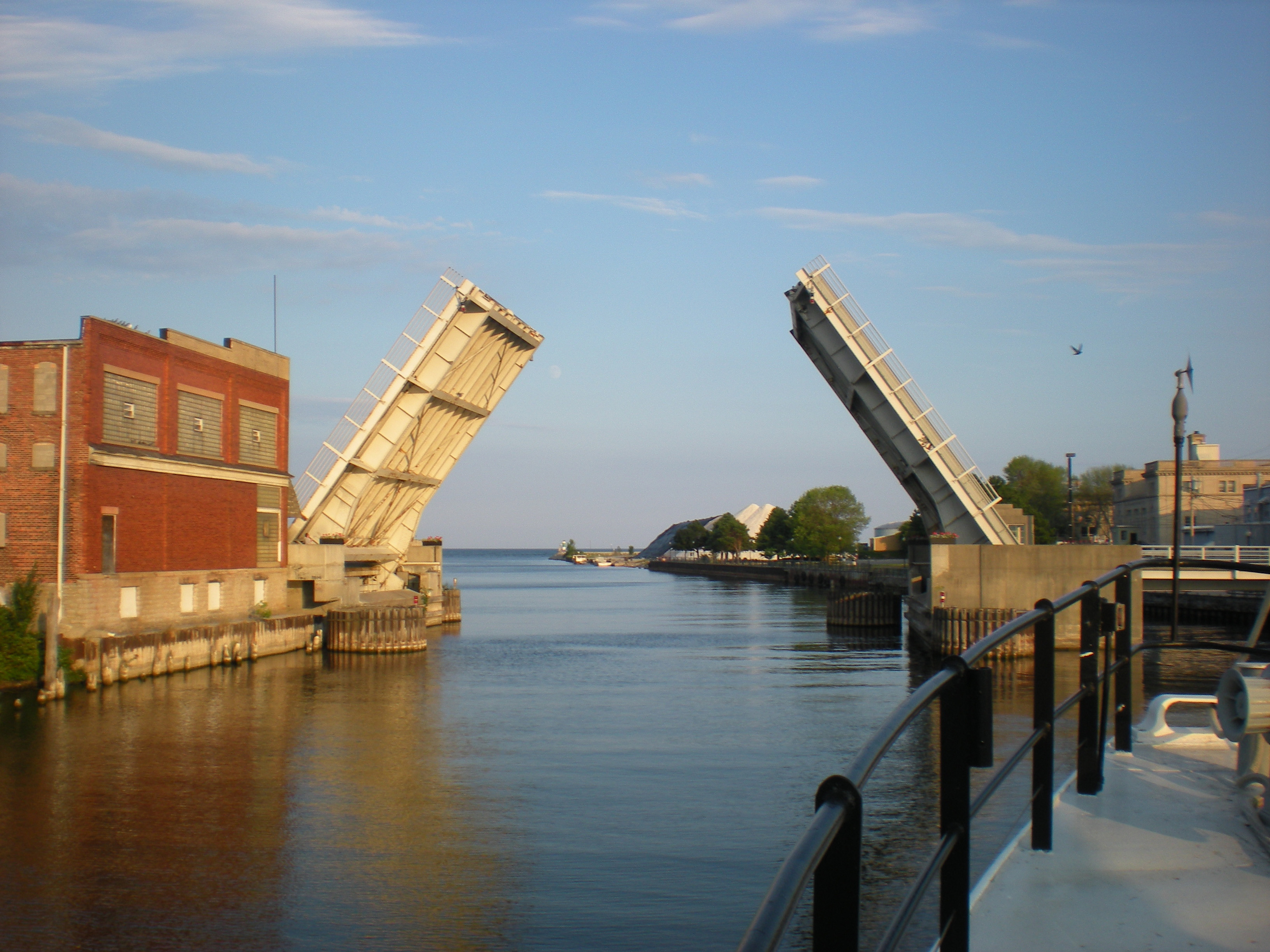
Alpena's 2nd Avenue Bridge, over the Thunder Bay River

== Economy ==
While tourism is an important component of the area's economy, both Alpena and Rogers City have an industrial base. In particular, Alpena is home to Lafarge-Holcim cement plant and to Besser Company (maker of a concrete block making machinery), as well as a drywall board manufacturing facility owned by Decorative Panels International. Rogers City is the location of the world's largest limestone quarry (see Michigan Limestone and Chemical Company), which is used in steel making in the Great Lakes and Rust Belt regions.

MidMichigan Health, a federally-designated rural regional medical referral center, is the largest employer in the city of Alpena.

Until it largely closed in 2022, Alpena's primary shopping center was the Alpena Mall, the only enclosed shopping mall in the northeastern Lower Peninsula. In full operation, the former mall featured approximately 20 stores, with JCPenney and Gordon Food Service as the anchor stores. Other retailers operate in this part of town and on M-32 west of town and south on US-23.

Alpena was also home to the Alpena Thunder hockey team, which was disbanded in 2011.

== Culture ==
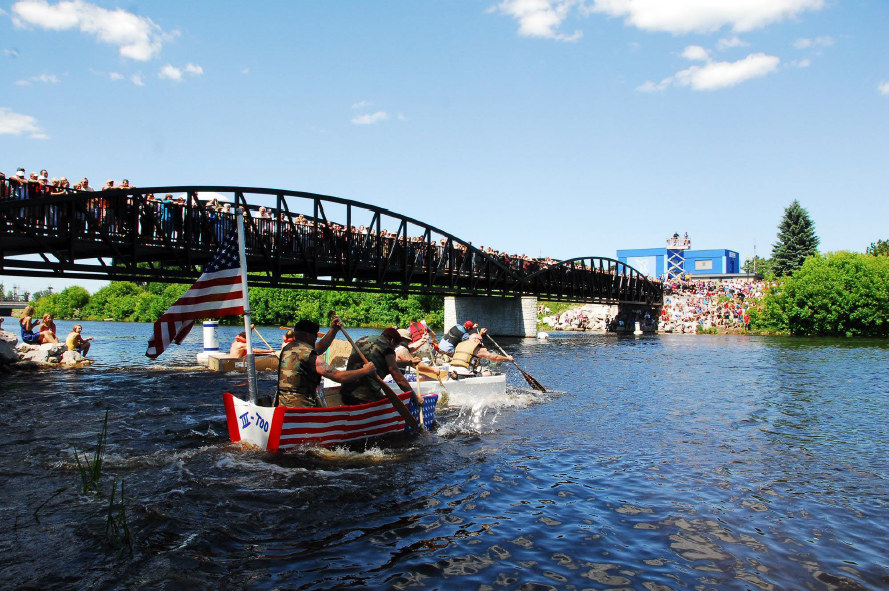
The 2011 running of the annual Cardboard Boat Regatta in Alpena.

Alpena is served by a number of institutions that enhance the artistic and cultural character of the city, reflecting its rich heritage in Great Lakes shipping and industry. Alpena is the gateway to the Thunder Bay National Marine Sanctuary, one of Michigan's 13 underwater preserves. The cold, fresh waters of the Great Lakes serve a valuable role in preserving the numerous shipwrecks in Lake Huron, documenting a history of tragedy that spans over 300 years. The Great Lakes Maritime Heritage Center in Alpena is the interpretive and administrative center of the sanctuary, located on the banks of the Thunder Bay River.

The local history of the Alpena area is documented by the Besser Museum, founded with an endowment from industrialist Jesse Besser. The Besser Museum is located on an 8 acres (3.2 ha) campus in northern Alpena, and is accredited by the American Alliance of Museums. Permanent attractions at the Besser Museum include a planetarium and the Katherine V., a wooden fishing tug that spent its entire life on Lake Huron. The Besser Museum also features rotating collections of art, science, and local history. The museum is the publisher of The Town that Wouldn't Die: A Photographic History of Alpena, Michigan from Its Beginnings Through 1940.

The Alpena County George N. Fletcher Public Library serves Alpena County. Its special collections include the Northeast Michigan Oral History Archive, the comprehensive Great Lakes Maritime Collection, and a full collection of Alpena newspapers dating back to 1871.

Arts organizations in the Alpena area include the Alpena Symphony Orchestra; the Alpena Civic Theatre; and the Thunder Bay Theatre, Northeast Michigan's year-round professional theatre located in the historic 1904 Spens Block on North Second Ave. Cinema in Alpena is supported by the newly opened Sanctuary Cinema, located in a former JCPenney store in Downtown Alpena, and the Maltz Opera House, currently under renovation to its 1920s-era appearance.

== Parks ==
- Avery Park
- Duck Park
- Island Park
- Mich-e-ke-wis Park
- McRae Park
- Rotary Island
- Starlite Beach
- Sytek Park
- Lamarre Park
- Thompson Park
- Washington Park
- Rockport State Park is Michigan's 100th state park and a dark sky preserve, is situated just north of the city on the Lake Huron shore. (Note: The park was previously known as "The Rockport property.") Within its 4,237 acres (1,715 ha)s, it contains a 300 acres (120 ha) abandoned limestone quarry, Devonian fossils, sinkholes and a protected deep water harbor. (Note: "... Rockport State Park, Michigan’s 100th State Park and an official Dark Sky Preserve includes a deep-water protected harbor, an old limestone quarry of approximately 300 acres, a unique series of sinkholes, Devonian Period fossils, the Besser Natural Area, and a broad range of land types, vegetative cover, cultural resources, and recreation opportunities) It is a U.S. 23 route heritage site. It is part of the "Alpena Blueway" paddling route. There are many other state parks in the area.

== Infrastructure ==
=== Air ===
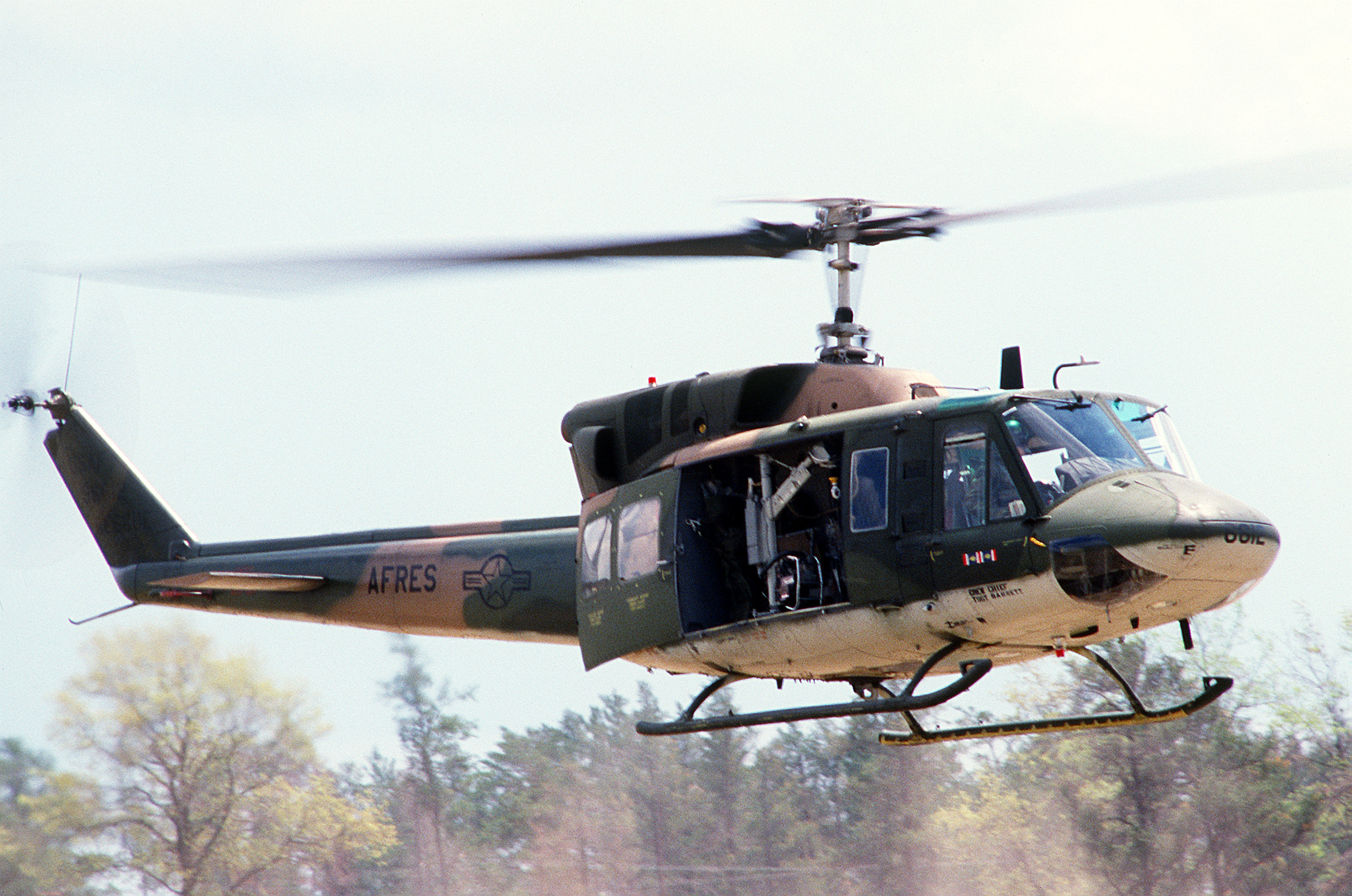
A U.S. Air Force Reserve Bell HH-1N Huey (s/n 69-6612) taking off on maneuvers during a reserve rescue exercise at Phelps Collins Air National Guard Base

Alpena County Regional Airport is the northeast lower peninsula of Michigan's main commercial airport and handles daily Delta Connection flights to Detroit, Minneapolis/St. Paul via Detroit, and to Pellston operated by SkyWest Airlines. It is a public-use airport located in Wilson Township, Michigan six miles (10 km) west of the central business district of Alpena. The Michigan Air National Guard's Alpena Combat Readiness Training Center co-utilizes the airfield.

=== Rail ===
Alpena is situated along the Lake State Railway, formerly the Detroit and Mackinac Railway (D&M). Earlier railroads that served Alpena were built and owned by the Alger Smith and Co. logging company: (1) the Detroit, Bay City and Alpena Railroad, which entered Alpena from the south around 1886, and (2) the Alpena and Northern Railroad. (Note: The tracks of older railroads have been removed and the roadbeds are now used by snowmobiles. Michigan Railroad history for Alpena. Archived 2013-07-24 at the Wayback Machine)

=== Bus ===
- Indian Trails provides daily intercity bus service between St. Ignace and Bay City, Michigan. This route is the Amtrak Thruway service for Alpena.

=== Major highways ===
- US 23 serves Alpena on its way along the Lake Huron shoreline. It has been designated the "Sunrise Side Coastal Highway", and runs along (or parallels) the Lake Huron shore. To the north, it passes Grand Lake and Long Lake, then to Rogers City, through Cheboygan, and on to Mackinaw City, where it ends at I-75 and the Mackinac Bridge. On US 23 as it crosses Birdsong Bay just south of Alpena exists a sign which notes that it rests on the 45th parallel, indicating travelers are halfway between the equator and the North Pole. This is one of 29 places (six are in Michigan) in the U.S. where such signs are known to exist. US 23 continues south to Ossineke then further south to Oscoda and Tawas City. US 23 south joins Interstate 75 near Standish where it continues south downstate.
- M-32 ends its 100-mile (160 km) easterly route from Lake Michigan to Lake Huron traversing the northern Lower Peninsula within downtown Alpena at an intersection with US 23.

=== Trails ===
- Alpena to Hillman Trail from Alpena to Hillman in Montmorency County.
- North Eastern State Trail from Alpena to Cheboygan in Cheboygan County

== Education ==
Alpena, along with the rest of Alpena County and portions of Presque Isle County, is served by Alpena Public Schools. Alpena Public Schools was established as the first county-wide school district in the state of Michigan in 1963. The district has one high school, a junior high, an alternative/adult high school, and six elementary schools. The elementary schools are Besser, Ella White, Hinks, Lincoln, Sanborn, and Wilson Elementary Schools. Geographically, it is the largest school district in the Lower Peninsula, encompassing more than 620 square miles (1,600 km^{2}).

There are two private schools in Alpena. All Saints Catholic School is affiliated with the four Roman Catholic parishes in the city (St. Anne's, St. Bernard's, St. John the Baptist and St. Mary of the Immaculate Conception) and provides preschool to 8th grade education. Immanuel Lutheran School is supported by the Immanuel Lutheran Church and has preschool to 8th grade classes.

Alpena is also home to Alpena Community College. ACC is a two-year associates program that has partnerships with Spring Arbor University and several other Michigan institutions.

== Media ==
=== Print ===
- The Alpena News is the daily (Monday to Saturday) newspaper of record for much of northeastern lower peninsula of Michigan.
- Daily editions of the Detroit Free Press and The Detroit News are also available throughout the area.

=== Radio ===
Alpena is home to several radio stations.

==== AM ====
Call Sign	Frequency	Format	City Broadcast From
WHAK	960	Talk	Rogers City

==== FM ====
Call Sign	Frequency	Format	City Broadcast From
WPHN	90.5/98.1	Religious	Gaylord
WCML	91.7	Public	Alpena
WFDX	92.5	Religious	Atlanta
WKJZ	94.9	Classic Hits	Hillman
WRGZ	96.7	Classic Rock	Rogers City
WATZ	99.3	Country	Alpena
WHAK	99.9	Classic Hits	Rogers City
WWTH	100.7	Classic Rock	Oscoda
WMJZ	101.5	Classic Hits	Gaylord
WKJC	104.7	Country	Tawas City
WGFM	105.1/103.7	Rock	Cheboygan
WZTK	105.7	Oldies	Alpena
WHSB	107.7	Top 40	Alpena

=== Television ===
Alpena is the third smallest (208) Nielsen Designated Market Area (DMA) in the United States.

Television stations located within the Alpena DMA:

- Channel 11: WBKB-TV - (CBS, NBC on DT2, ABC on DT3, Fox/MyNetworkTV on DT4); the only locally programmed terrestrial station within the market
- Channel 6: WCML-TV - (PBS) - satellite of WCMU-TV Mount Pleasant

Cable only television:

- Cable 3: Alpena Community College educational television
- Cable 21: Alpena CW (WBAE)-(The CW+)

Northeast Michigan is also served by selected major network affiliates from the Northern Michigan DMA, as well as CBC Television programming from CBMT-DT in Montreal. Cable television service is provided within Alpena and many outlying communities by Charter Communications.

== Notable people ==
- Jesse Besser, inventor and benefactor of the Besser Museum for Northeast Michigan; lived in Alpena
- Paul Bunker, 1901 and 1902 All-American football player; College Football Hall of Famer; born in Alpena
- William Comstock, 33rd governor of Michigan; born in Alpena
- Leon Czolgosz, assassin of U.S. President William McKinley; lived in Alpena
- Bob Devaney, football coach for Nebraska Cornhuskers football and Wyoming Cowboys football; College Football Hall of Famer; lived in Alpena
- Brian Dutcher, basketball coach for San Diego State; born in Alpena
- Jim Dutcher, former basketball head coach for University of Minnesota; born in Alpena
- Robert L. Emerson, Michigan state Senator; born in Alpena
- The Frost, psychedelic rock band of the '60s and '70s originated in Alpena. Several members were born there.
- Emma Gentry, professional ice hockey forward for the Toronto Sceptres, attended Alpena High School
- Stanley Grenz, Christian theologian; born in Alpena
- Blaise Ilsley, pitcher for the Chicago Cubs; born in Alpena
- Lloyd R. Leavitt, Jr., United States Air Force general; born in Alpena
- Betty Mahmoody, author of Not Without My Daughter; lived in Alpena
- Harvey Marlatt, shooting guard for the Detroit Pistons; born in Alpena
- Andrew Marwede, professional disc golfer; born in Alpena
- Arthur William McLeod, member of the Wisconsin State Assembly; born in Alpena
- Joel Potrykus, filmmaker (Ape (2012 film)); born in Alpena
- Dan Rohn, infielder for the Chicago Cubs and Cleveland Indians; born in Alpena
- Paul Fitzpatrick Russell, Roman Catholic archbishop and diplomat; lived in Alpena
- Michael Bailey Smith, actor (Charmed); born in Alpena
- K. J. Stevens, novelist and short story writer; born in Alpena
- Kevin Young, first baseman for the Kansas City Royals and Pittsburgh Pirates; born in Alpena

== See also ==
- Alpena Light
- Roman Catholic Diocese of Gaylord

== Bibliography ==
- Haltiner, Robert E.; Taber, Ann (1986). The Town that Wouldn't Die: A Photographic History of Alpena, Michigan from Its Beginnings Through 1940. Alpena, Michigan: Jesse Besser Museum. ISBN 0-9617779-0-7.
