= Besser Museum for Northeast Michigan =

Community museum in Alpena County, Michigan, U.S.

Coordinates: 45.0808°N 83.4485°W

The Besser Museum for Northeast Michigan is a community museum serving Alpena County and surrounding counties in the U.S. state of Michigan. Alpena is a port city on Lake Huron. (Note: It is the core city of the Alpena micropolitan statistical area, which encompasses all of Alpena County and had a total population of 28,360 at the 2010 census. As of the census of 2010, there were 10,483 people, 4,734 households, and 2,565 families residing in the city.) The museum defines its role broadly — to preserve, protect and present history and culture closely connected with the heritage of Northern Michigan and the Great Lakes. The museum includes a small publicly-owned planetarium.

== Description ==
The Besser Museum traces its core endowment to benefactor Jesse Besser (1882-1970), the founder of Besser block, an Alpena manufacturer of concrete block manufacturing machinery. During World War II and following years, concrete blocks became essential materials of worldwide construction. Besser's 1964 gift enabled the creation of a community museum in Alpena, which was at first called the Jesse Besser Museum. The endowment enabled the museum to be professionally staffed and accredited by the American Alliance of Museums. The facility has retained its accreditation and has changed its name to reflect its outreach to many communities in northeastern Michigan. The only accredited museum in Northern Michigan, it “boasts one of the finest collections of Great Lakes Indian artifacts in the country.”

On the campus, there are restored historical buildings. The museum is an important contributor and stakeholder in the Thunder Bay National Marine Sanctuary.

=== Today ===
The museum's 42,000 square feet (3,900 m^{2}) building contained 47,000 catalogued artifacts as of 2020. There is an 8 acres (3.2 ha) campus, that has outdoor exhibits and adjunct buildings. A two-story Foucault pendulum is in the lobby. The full dome and newly renovated and equipped full sky planetarium shows films and exhibitions. The outdoor Lafarge Fossil Park exhibit features Devonian fossils. Fine art includes works from artists such as Paul Cézanne, glass sculptor Dale Chihuly, Pablo Picasso, Pierre-Auguste Renoir and Diego Rivera. It has been described as serving 15 counties of the northeastern Lower Peninsula. The museum is at the forefront of telling the story of Alpena, including fishing, logging, mining, concrete, concrete block machinery development design, technology and manufacturing, and is in the midst of “Shipwreck alley.”

In its fossil garden, there is an exterior mural depicting the Devonian Period by artist Judy Dawley. The original painting is inside the museum.

The museum includes a 1890s pharmacy display window, part of a larger reconstructed “Avenue of Shops,” which includes 12 shops. The display includes bottles of pharmaceuticals, drug store paraphernalia and ephemera.

=== Fisheries ===
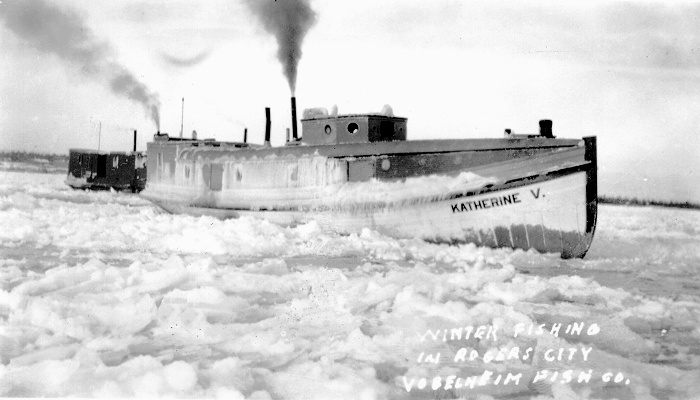
Fishing Tug Katherine V at work

The museum is part of the Great Lakes Fisheries Heritage Trail. As such, it brings together historic artifacts, fishing vessels, gear, and dock sites which were part of the commercial fishing industry indigenous to Lake Huron and the northeast Michigan shores. Sport fishing, recreational fishing, and Great Lakes ecology are documented, with the Research Vessel Chinook being a work in progress. The Fishing Tug Katherine V, designated US 228069, is a Great Lakes fish tug displayed there; it is believed to be the last intact wooden fishing tug left. (Note: In 1931, the Katherine V came to the assistance of another fishing tug, The Tramp, which became locked in ice that was 20 feet (6.1 m) thick. "The diligent crew worked tirelessly to free the vessel, but it still took seven days to break free. The Katherine V and Tramp resumed their plans to catch fish, but the duo eventually had to return. Rather than risk becoming stuck again, the crews mutually agreed to wait until the ice would part. The two vessels waited for two weeks until they could return. The boats reached nearly ¾ of a mile from shore, but the ice ahead of them was impenetrable. Both vessels left a watchman on duty at night in case the wind decided to change course.") It was listed on the National Register of Historic Places in 2003. The vessel is one of about 900 boats that were in the Great Lakes gill net fishing fleet. She is unique having spent her entire fishing career in Lake Huron waters off the northeastern Lower peninsula. It has been noted that, "The Katherine V is the last remaining example of the large, wooden fish tugs that once plied the waters of Lake Huron on both the Canadian and American sides of the lake. She is also a splendid example of wooden ship building methods and skills that were once common among the craftsmen of this region."

=== Concrete ===
The original Besser block machine is on display at the Besser Museum. Herman Besser was involved with the Alpena Portland Cement company. In 1904, his son, Jesse Besser, developed the first hand-tamp block machine. This technology ‘revolutionized the block-making industry” and the Besser Company was born. The company is still a leader in block making machinery technology. Its international headquarters is in Alpena.

A recurrent event is the "Fall Harvest Festival." Highlights have included tours of the limestone quarry, the Lafarge quarry (on site in Alpena, and an adjunct to the Lafarge Cement plant), (Note: The Lafarge limestone quarry operation in Alpena at one time housed the largest Portland cement plant in the world, as noted in an historical marker. Today it is the second largest.) which quarries Alpena Limestone and Rockport Quarry Limestone and gypsum, and guided demonstrations at the World Center for Concrete Technology at Alpena Community College. Attendees are shown "how the fossilized limestone at the Lafarge Quarry is processed to make cement; and the technologies, inventions, and career opportunities that support the concrete industry." At the museum, visitors can hunt for Devonian Period fossils in the museum's Fossil Park

=== Fossils ===
The limestone laid down around Alpena comes from the Devonian Period, the 4th period of the Paleozoic Era (roughly 416-358 million years ago) – the "Age of the Fishes". Marine life was intensely diverse, before formation of the supercontinent of Pangaea, when 85% of the earth's surface was oceans. Fish of this period were cartilaginous, mainly shark ancestors. Cartilage does not fossilize, so fossils from the area are typically from "filter feeding" creatures. However, a carnivorous remnant of the Middle Devonian Period is to found in the fossils of the area. (Note: A good day trip in the vicinity to search for Devonian Period fossils is the Rockport State Recreation Area.) Dunkleosteus (pronounced DUNKLE-OSTEUS) had bony armor on its head and frontal body, as well as bony structures, (much like teeth), "used to shear their prey. Paleontologists can only speculate what the torso and tail of this fish looked like, however it is believed that the Dunkleosteus" reached 33 feet (10 m). A depiction of this fish is in the mural outside of Besser Museum. It was painted by Judy Dawley, and is nearby the museum's Fossil Dig Park.

=== Activities ===
At the Besser Museum, visitors can watch crafts confectioners make fudge and learn the history of this candy in Northern Michigan, often called Mackinac Island fudge. The restored backyard Historic Village and expanded Fisheries Heritage exhibits are offered, along with apple cider and doughnuts.

Juried art exhibitions take place at the Museum.

According to The Alpena News, concurrent with the Alpena Mall's closure in December 2022, its huge collection of Christmas trees and decorations was gifted to the museum which now uses them in their holiday exhibit.

=== Planetarium ===
As of 2016, the Meseum worked with donors to refit the planetarium as a place of digital star discovery. Veteran 50-year-old electromechanical sky-display equipment was retired and replaced. The refitted planetarium features full-dome digital sky theater capability. The newly installed Spitz Digital Dome planetarium projector necessitated the hiring of additional staff. (Note: Of the approximately 300 permanent planetariums in the United States and 3,000 in the world, they are typically distributed in more populous centers.) It opened in 1966, has a dome of 9.1 metres (30 ft), 51 seats, Starball projector Spitz A3P, and a digital system Spitz SciDome.

=== Visitor information ===
An admission fee is charged. One museum artifact that is on free public display is the salvaged Admiralty-style bow anchor of the 19th-century steamship SS Pewabic, sunk in a tragic collision in 1865.

== Publishing ==
The museum published The Town That Wouldn't Die: A Photographic History of Alpena, Michigan from Its Beginnings Through 1940.

== See also ==
- List of museums in Michigan
- Herman and Hattie (Ely) Besser House
- National Register of Historic Places listings in Alpena County, Michigan
