= McKinley, Michigan =

- Unincorporated community
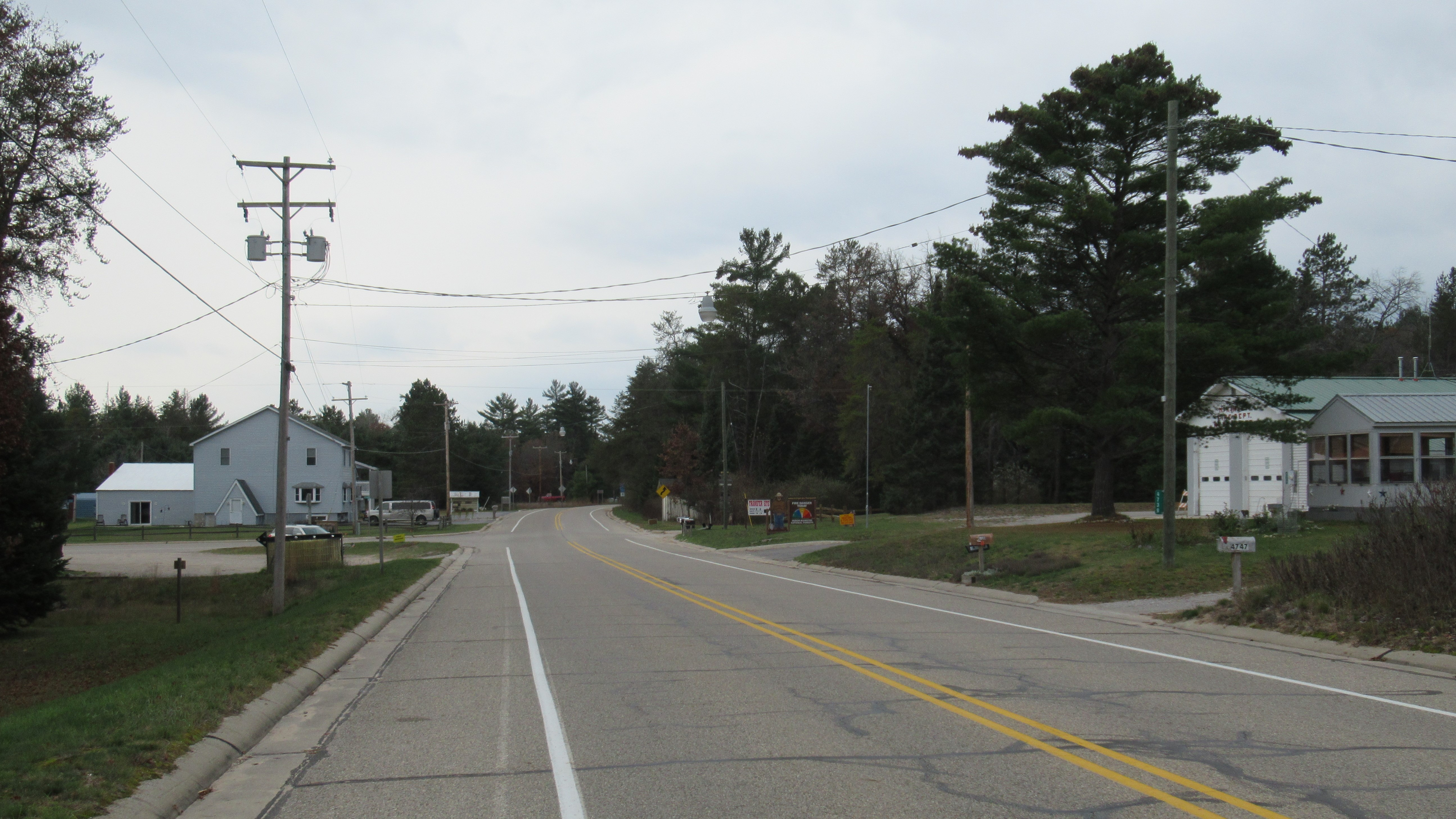
- Looking west along McKinley Road (F-32)

- Location within the state of Michigan Location within the United States
- Coordinates: 44°38′49″N 83°56′14″W
- Country: United States
- State: Michigan
- County: Oscoda
- Township: Mentor
- Settled: 1880
- Elevation: 922 ft (281 m)
- Time zone: UTC-5 (Eastern (EST))
  - Summer (DST): UTC-4 (EDT)
- ZIP code(s): 48647 (Mio)
- Area code: 989
- GNIS feature ID: 1620772

McKinley is an unincorporated community in Oscoda County in the U.S. state of Michigan. The community is located within Mentor Township. As an unincorporated community, McKinley has no legally defined boundaries or population statistics of its own.

== Geography ==
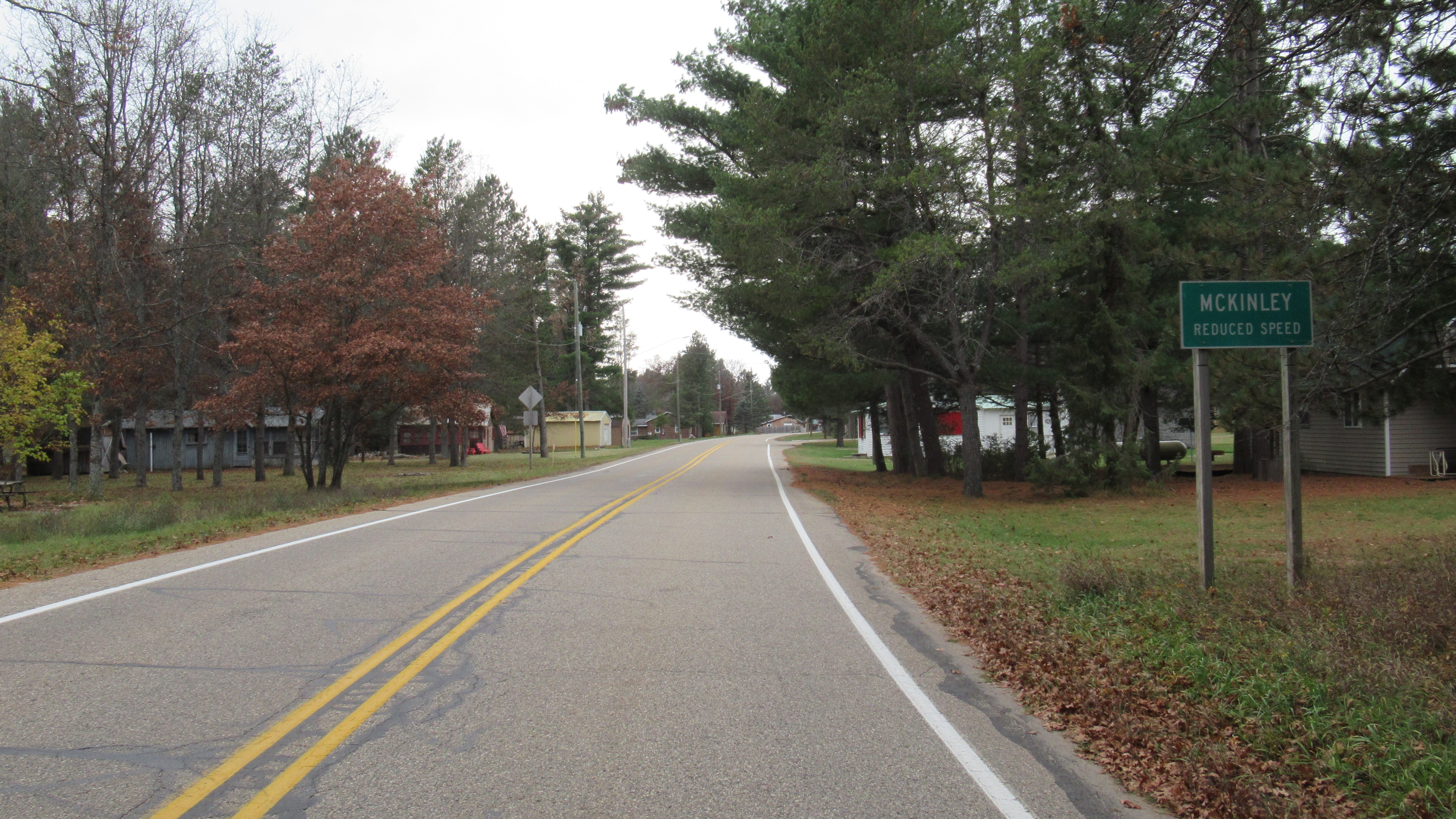
Road signage along McKinley Road

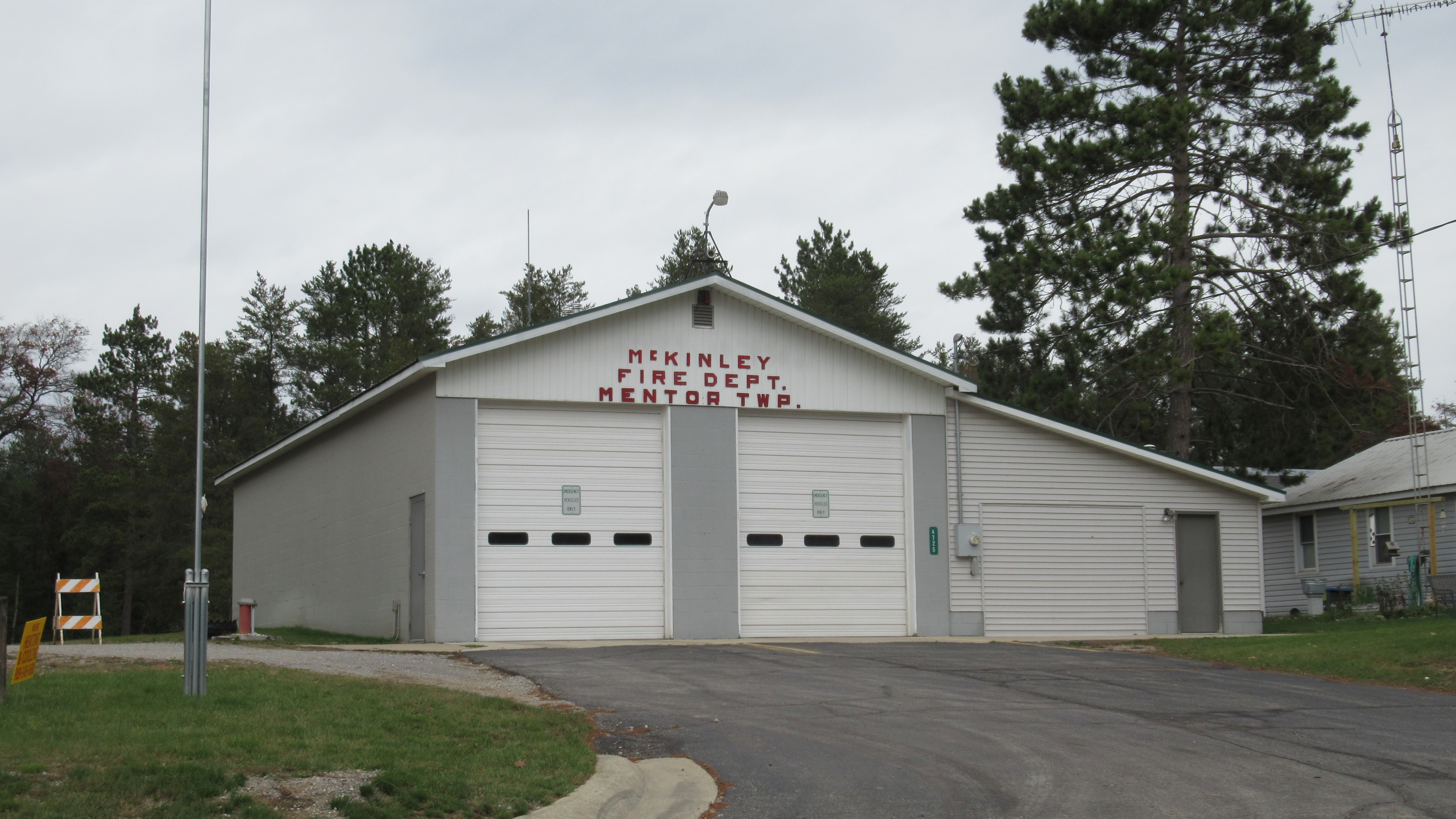
McKinley Fire Department

McKinley is a rural community in Oscoda County in Northern Michigan about 45 miles (72 km) directly east of Grayling. The community is located in northeast Mentor Township and sits at an elevation of 922 feet (281 m) above the sea level.

F-32 (McKinley Road) is a county highway and main roadway through the community, and it connects to M-33/M-72 (South Mount Tom Road) about 10 miles (16 km) to the west in the community of Mio. The sparsely populated area is not directly served by any other highways, airports, or railways. In addition to Mio, the nearest unincorporated communities include Kneeland, Fairview, and Comins to the northwest; Curtisville to the southeast; and Curran to the northeast. The nearest incorporated municipality is the city of Rose City about 28 miles (45 km) to the southwest via roadway.

The main branch of the Au Sable River flows through the community, and this stretch of the river is managed by the U.S. Forest Service as the Au Sable National Scenic River. The surrounding area is heavily forested and is also part of the Huron National Forest. The Michigan Department of Natural Resources manages a public boat launch along the river at Evans Road in McKinley. The small unimproved boat launch is only suitable for carrying kayaks and small canoes.

The Evans Road crossing, known as the McKinley Bridge, is the first bridge downstream after the M-33/M-72 crossing directly after the Mio Dam. This stretch of the river is about 12.5 miles (20.1 km) long and is a popular kayaking and fishing destination, especially for brook trout fishing. The river conditions and fish populations between Mio and McKinley are routinely monitored and studied. The next nearest bridge downstream after McKinley is the Federal Route 4001 bridge in Mitchell Township about 7.5 miles (12.1 km) east.

The community operates the McKinley Fire Department, which is a volunteer fire department located at 4725 McKinley Road. McKinley no longer has its own post office and is served by the Mio 48647 ZIP Code. The community is served by Mio-AuSable Schools in Mio.

== History ==
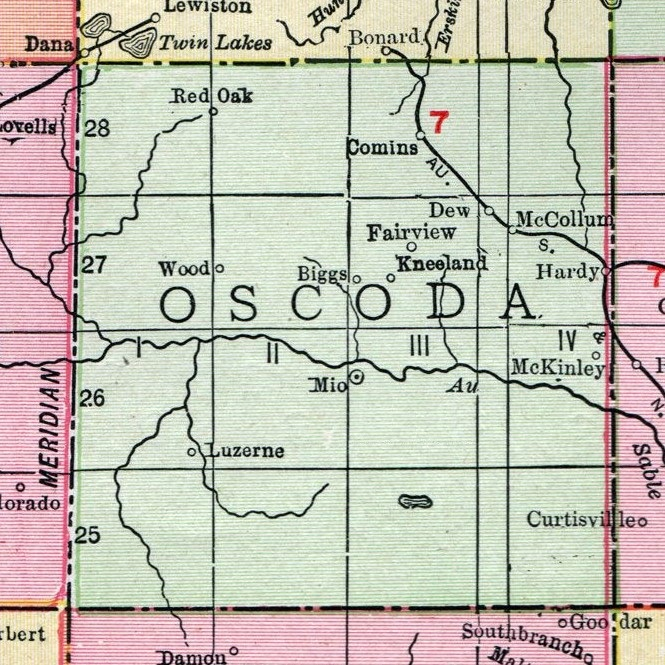
McKinley appearing on a 1911 map of Oscoda County

The area was originally part of the Michigan Territory and occupied by Native Americans until the land was ceded to the American government in the Treaty of Saginaw in 1819. Although Oscoda County was created in 1841, it was not formally organized until 1881. The area of McKinley was first settled as early as 1880, which was within Comins Township as part of Alcona County. Oscoda County would be officially established on March 10, 1881. When the county was established, McKinley became part of the new Mentor Township.

McKinley was developed as a lumber and mining community along the Au Sable River about 12.0 miles (19.3 km) east of Mio. The community was originally known as Potts' Headquarters after J. E. Potts and was one of the first lumber communities in the region. Potts moved to the area from Simcoe, Ontario and established the J. E. Potts Salt & Lumber Company. At first, the community benefited by floating its supplies down the Au Sable River. Several barges were also later put into service to aid in the shipping of the lumber all the way down the river to the village of Au Sable. In 1886, the company built a 50-mile (80 km) narrow-gauge railway that ran from the Tong Station in northwest Oscoda County to Luzerne in the southwest. The Potts railway station was approximately in the middle of the train route. The community received a post office under the name Potts on June 3, 1886. Jeremiah Hunt served as its first postmaster. In 1886, the community of Potts was thriving and had a population of around 700. It included several stores, machine shops, hotels, churches, and the lumber camp. At the height of the community, it was the largest settlement in Oscoda County.

In an attempt to expand their lumber production, the company extended its railway all the way to Au Sable. This expansion allowed the J. E. Potts Salt & Lumber Company to become one of the largest lumber companies in Michigan, and they shipped their products to far away places like Chicago and into Canada. By 1888, the company was shipping 500,000 feet (150,000 m) of logs everyday.

However, these costs forced the company to accumulate considerable debt. They were forced to sell some of their assets to the competing H. M. Loud & Sons Lumber Company from Oscoda in 1888, which purchased their railroad equipment, machinery, and land. Under the H. M. Loud & Sons Lumber Company, the community returned to profitability and focused entirely on lumber production. The J. E. Potts Salt & Lumber Company shut down in 1890, and the community had about 600 residents at the time. In 1891, all of the Potts assets were absorbed by the H. M. Loud & Sons Lumber Company, and the railway formed as the Au Sable and Northwestern Railroad under the management of George A. Loud. The post office changed its name from Potts to McKinley on January 28, 1892.

After this, the lumber industry began to decline as the resources dwindled. By 1897, the community had only 250 residents but still sustained as a lumber community. However, the community would suffer when the railroad repair shops were destroyed in a large fire in 1900. Due to McKinley's relative isolation from other communities and the decreasing supply of lumber in the area, the community was not rebuilt. When the lumber industry left McKinley, the community quickly declined as residents left, while the lumber industry continued in other areas. By 1905, McKinley only had 50 residents and included only one church, store, and post office. Many buildings were also moved to nearby communities, and McKinley became deserted. The railway lines were also removed. The post office closed on September 30, 1913. In 1917, McKinley only had 20 residents, and mail service was handled by South Branch to the south in Ogemaw County.

=== Recent history ===
After the lumber industry ended and the isolated community became abandoned, the land was sold and redeveloped as a resort destination by the 1940s. In 1969, the community grew to include about 35 families, a gas station and store, church, and community hall. In 1982, the roadway passing through McKinley became part of the newly-designated F-32, which is one of the state's longest county highways, running from Grayling to Curran.

In 1984, the U.S. Forest Service under President Ronald Reagan designated the stretch of the Au Sable River running through McKinley as the Au Sable National Scenic River, which flows eastward for 23 miles (37 km) from Mio to the Alcona Dam Pond as part of the Huron National Forest.

The community of McKinley continues to exist as a tourist destination centered around fishing, boating, camping, and off-road vehicle trails. The community has a small permanent population, a few businesses, fire department, and community hall; although, it may still be considered a ghost town due to its rapid decline and lack of growth after the lumber industry ceased operation in the area.
