= Comins, Michigan =

Unincorporated community in Michigan, US

- Unincorporated community
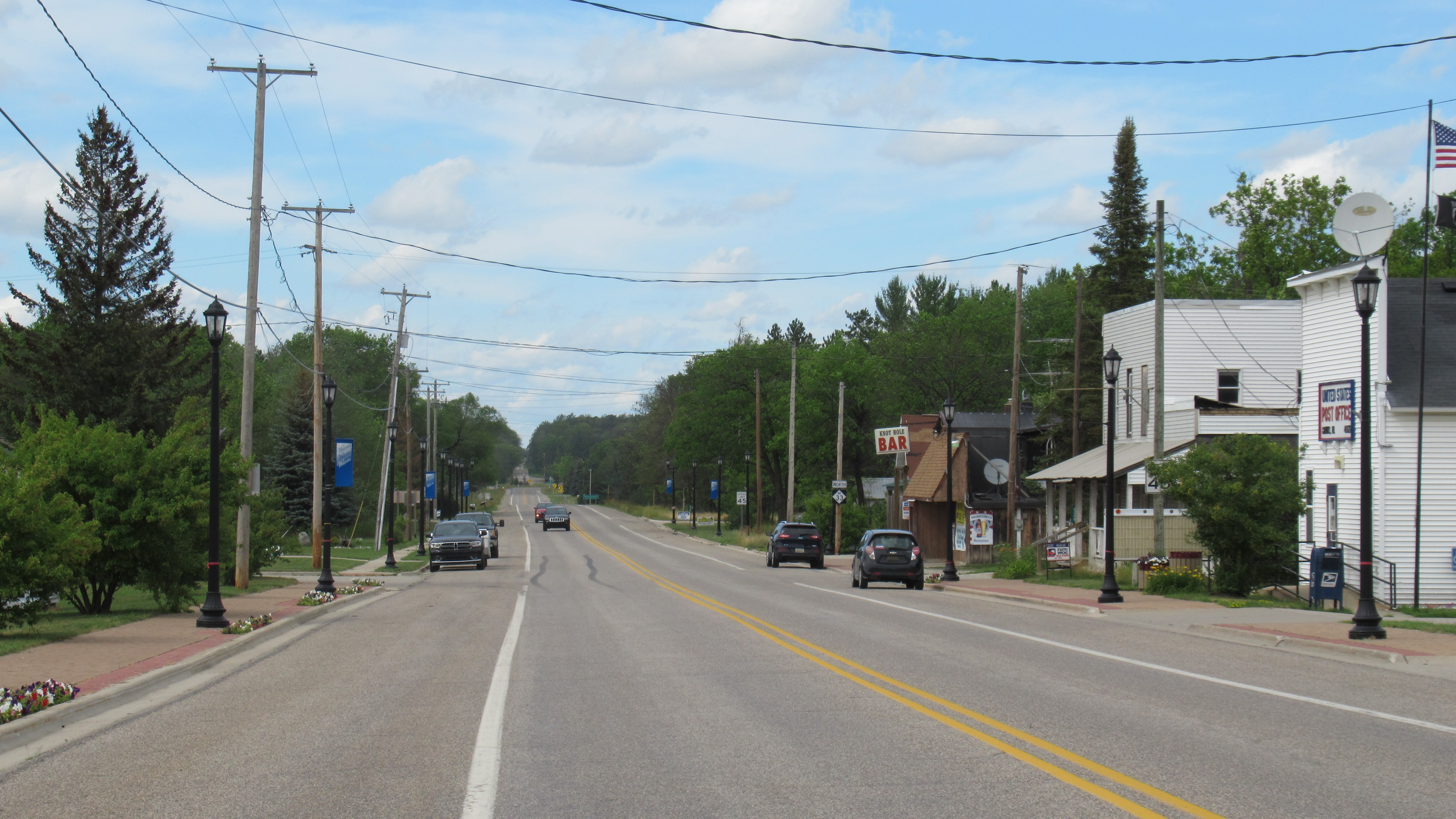
- Looking north along M-33
- Motto: "Ghost town with a lot of spirit"
- Location within the state of Michigan Location within the United States
- Coordinates: 44°48′18″N 84°03′05″W
- Country: United States
- State: Michigan
- County: Oscoda
- Township: Clinton
- Settled: 1873
- Established: 1881
- Elevation: 1,047 ft (319 m)
- Time zone: UTC-5 (Eastern (EST))
  - Summer (DST): UTC-4 (EDT)
- ZIP code(s): 48619
- Area code: 989
- GNIS feature ID: 626935

Comins is an unincorporated community in Oscoda County in the U.S. state of Michigan. The community is located within Clinton Township. As an unincorporated community, Comins has no legally defined boundaries or population statistics of its own but does have its own post office with the 48619 ZIP Code.

== Geography ==
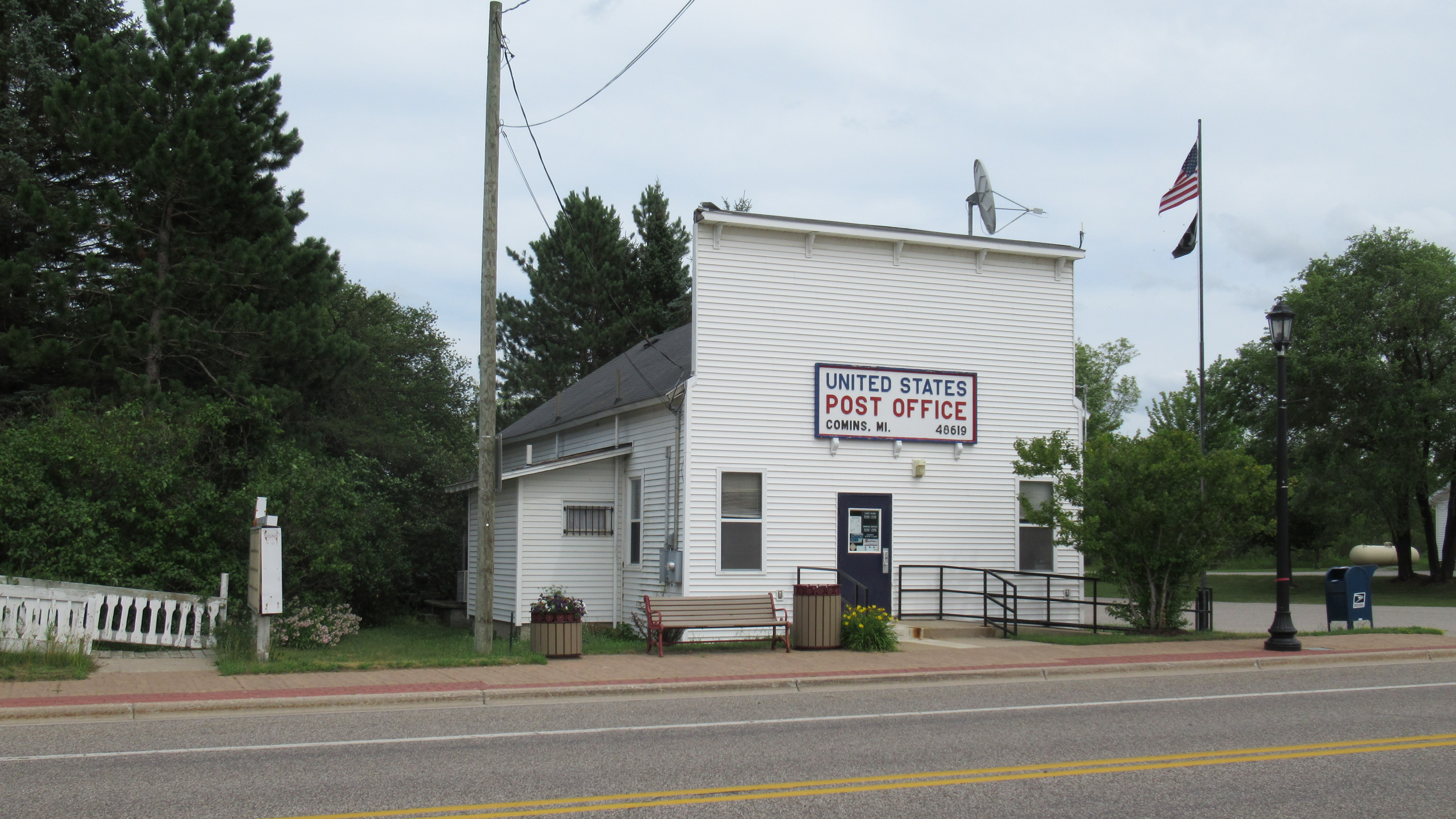
U.S. Post Office in Comins

Comins is centered along M-33, which is referred to locally as North Abbe Road. The community is located in Northern Michigan within Clinton Township. It is in northeastern Oscoda County about 60 miles (97 km) northwest of the community of Oscoda. The community sits at an elevation of 1,047 feet (319 m) above sea level.

Marsh Creek runs near the center of the community, which is also part of Comins Marsh. Comins is not actually located within Comins Township, which is located just south of the center of the community. Many other geographic locations have the name Comins, including a cemetery, stream, and flats, but these are located outside of the community in Comins Township to the south.

Comins uses its own post office with the 48619 ZIP Code, which serves most of the sparsely populated areas of Clinton Township, smaller portions of northern Comins Township and eastern Elmer Township, as well as the southernmost portions of Loud Township and Rust Township to the north in Montmorency County. The current post office is located at 4240 North Abbe Road (M-33). Comins and the surrounding area are served by Fairview Area School District in the community of Fairview to the south in Comins Township. The district serves all of Clinton Township and Comins Township, as well as the northern half of Elmer Township to the west. Other nearby communities include Fairview and Mio to the south, Curran to the southeast, and Lewiston to the northwest.

== History ==
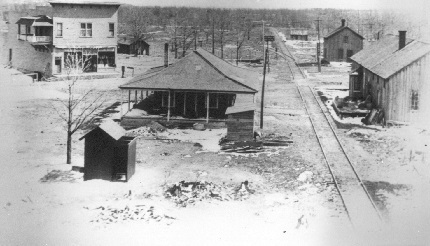
Historic image of Comins

The area was first settled by logger Coolidge Comins, who moved to the area from Bangor, Maine in 1873. At the time, the area was part of Alcona County to the east. Oscoda County itself was not established until 1881. A narrow-gauge railway was constructed by the H.M. Loud & Sons Lumber Company through the community in the 1890s. The line was operated by Au Sable & North Western Railroad, and the Comins Station had the advantage of being the last station along its route. The railroad allowed for easy transport of lumber to the community of Oscoda on the coast of Lake Huron. Comins quickly grew to become the lumbering hub of Oscoda County. Comins also benefited from the folding of the nearby community of McKinley, which suffered a series of devastating fires by 1900. Most of its railroad and lumber services moved to Comins, and the McKinley railroad depot building was also physically moved to Comins.

Comins received its first post office in 1881. It was discontinued soon after on January 16, 1882, but then reestablished again November 15, 1900. It was again discontinued on February 28, 1913. The post office was ultimately reestablished on March 11, 1914, and it remains in operation.

The line was eventually sold to the Detroit and Mackinac Railway, which expanded it to a standard-gauge railway in 1912. Comins grew to include several stores, post office, railroad depot, and a lumber warehouse. Livestock were also shipped from the depot. The community had a population of 35 in 1917. Designated in 1919, M-33 is a state highway that runs south–north directly through the community. When the lumber sources were depleted, the railway was no longer profitable and discontinued in 1928. The train station and the railway line were eventually removed entirely.

=== Recent history ===
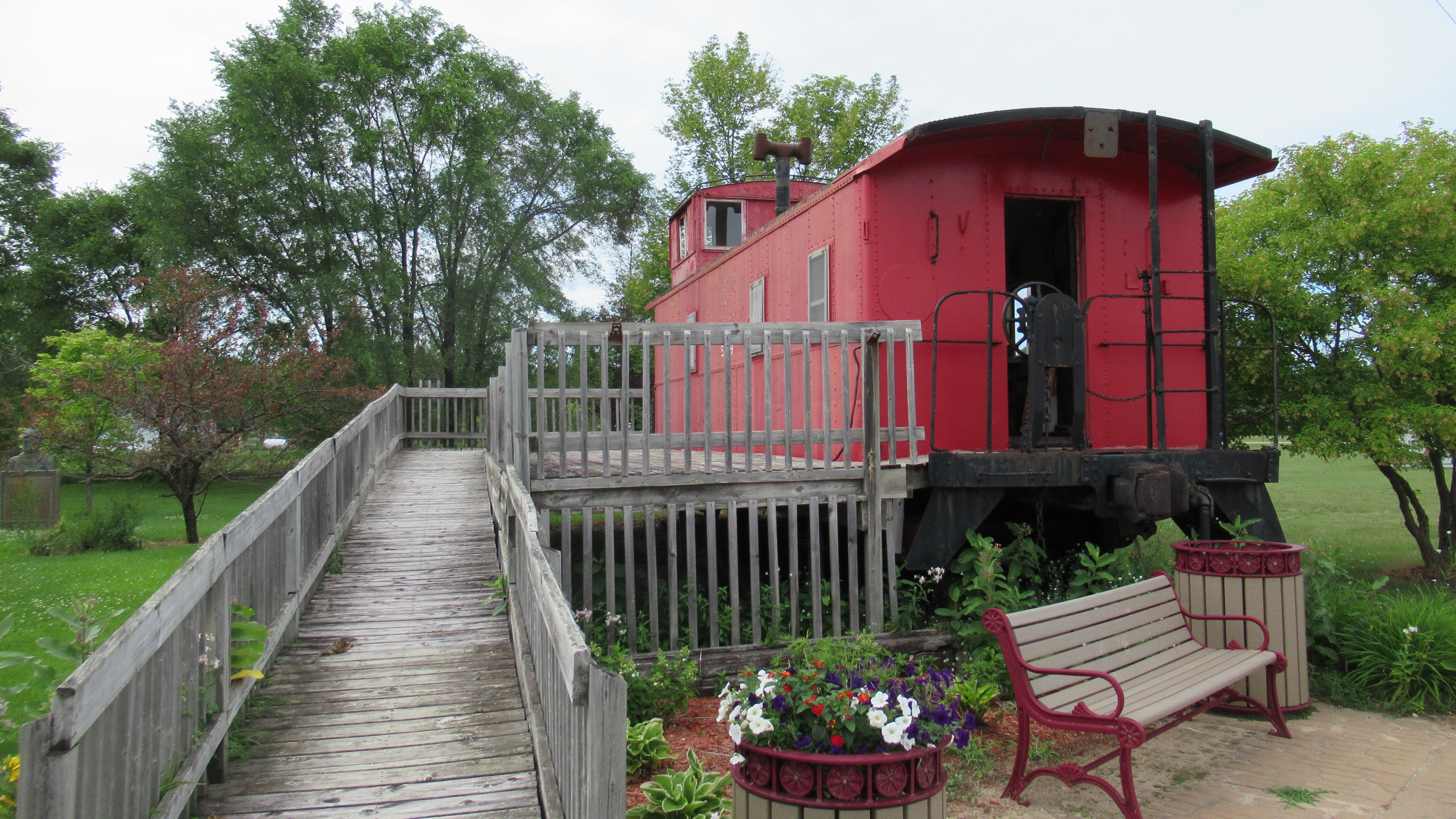
Comins Old Red Caboose

In 1985, a Grand Trunk model caboose was donated to Comins from its previous owners in Monroe. Its intent was to serve as a relic and exhibit of the community's earlier railroad days. Although the service history of the caboose is unknown, it was repainted solid red in the style of a Detroit and Mackinac Railway caboose. It was placed by dual cranes on a small set of railroad tracks. The caboose is located along M-33 across the street from the township hall and currently operates as a museum known colloquially as the Comins Old Red Caboose.

An F2 tornado struck the community of Comins in the evening on July 3, 1999. The tornado appeared quickly and cut a devastating path through the community, completely destroying a church, the township hall, post office, and fire department. Several businesses and homes were also destroyed or heavily damaged. Reportedly, the only undisturbed building was the historic caboose museum. Many buildings were not rebuilt, which left some noticeably empty plots in the center of the community. The Clinton Township Hall, which is located in Comins, was rebuilt. It is located at 4245 North Abbe Road right next door to the post office.

In 1995, Comins became the location of the Kirtland's warbler chapter of the Michigan Audubon Society.
