= Elmer Township, Michigan =

Elmer Township is the name of some places in the U.S. state of Michigan:

- Elmer Township, Oscoda County, Michigan
- Elmer Township, Sanilac County, Michigan
