= Big Creek Township, Michigan =

- Civil township
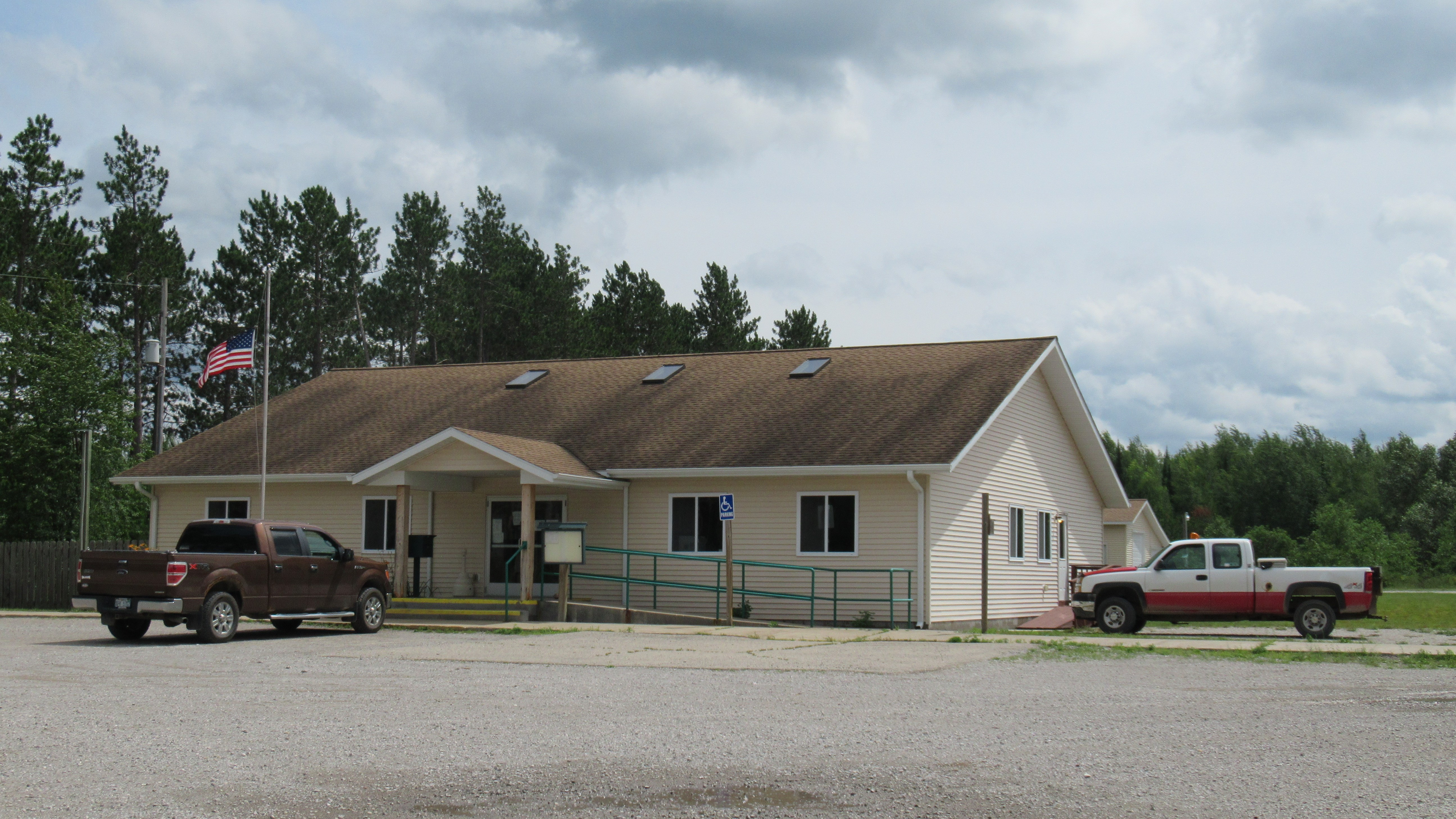
- Big Creek Township Hall

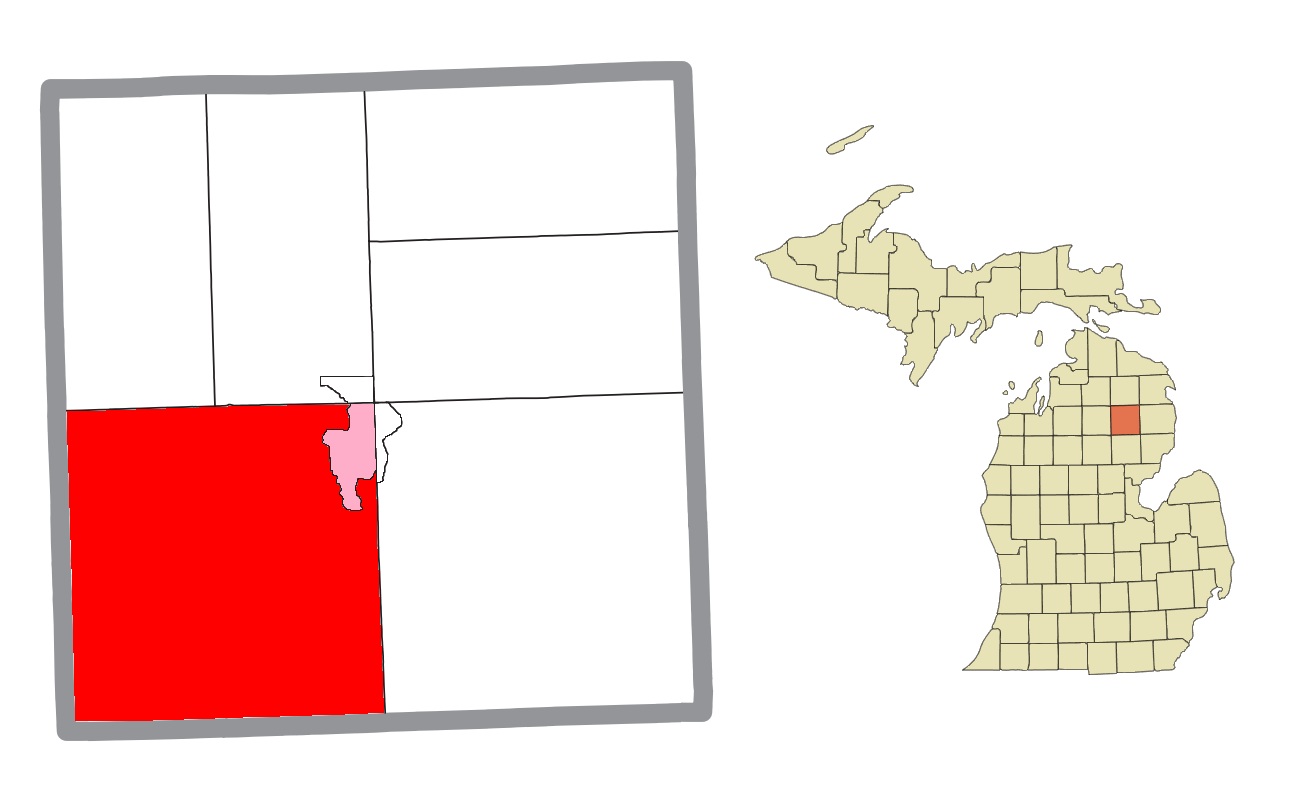
- Location within Oscoda County (red) and an administered portion of the Mio community (pink)

- Location within the state of Michigan Location within the United States
- Coordinates: 44°36′42″N 84°13′25″W
- Country: United States
- State: Michigan
- County: Oscoda
- Established: 1886

Government
  - Supervisor: James Booth
  - Clerk: Rhonda Mundt

Area
  - Total: 143.15 sq mi (370.76 km^{2})
  - Land: 141.66 sq mi (366.90 km^{2})
  - Water: 1.49 sq mi (3.86 km^{2})
- Elevation: 1,089 ft (332 m)

Population (2020)
  - Total: 2,604
  - Density: 18.4/sq mi (7.1/km^{2})
- Time zone: UTC-5 (Eastern (EST))
  - Summer (DST): UTC-4 (EDT)
- ZIP code(s): 48636 (Luzerne); 48647 (Mio); 48654 (Rose City); 48661 (West Branch); 49756 (Lewiston)
- Area code: 989
- FIPS code: 26-08220
- GNIS feature ID: 1625932
- Website: Official website

Big Creek Township is a civil township of Oscoda County in the U.S. state of Michigan. The population was 2,604 at the 2020 census.

== Communities ==
- Luzerne is an unincorporated community on M-72 at 44°36′57″N 84°16′16″W. The Luzerne 48636 ZIP Code serves most of the western portion of the township, as well as small areas in the southern part of Greenwood Township.
- Mio is an unincorporated community and census-designated place located at 44°39′08″N 84°07′47″W. The CDP occupies the northeast portion of the township, and it also extends into neighboring Elmer and Mentor townships. The Mio 48647 ZIP Code most of the eastern portion of the township.

== Geography ==
According to the U.S. Census Bureau, the township has a total area of 143.15 square miles (370.76 km^{2}), of which 141.66 square miles (366.90 km^{2}) is land and 1.49 square miles (3.86 km^{2}) (1.04%) is water.

The Au Sable River runs through the northern edge of Big Creek Township, and the Mio Dam and its reservoir are located within the township.

=== Major highways ===
- M-33 forms most of the eastern boundary of the township with Mentor Township.
- M-72 runs mostly west–east through the northern portion of the township.
- F-32 runs briefly concurrently with M-33 in northeast corner of the township.

== Demographics ==
As of the census of 2000, there were 3,380 people, 1,422 households, and 968 families residing in the township. The population density was 23.9 inhabitants per square mile (9.2/km^{2}). There were 3,089 housing units at an average density of 21.8 per square mile (8.4/km^{2}). The racial makeup of the township was 97.49% White, 0.06% African American, 0.50% Native American, 0.12% Asian, 0.03% Pacific Islander, 0.15% from other races, and 1.66% from two or more races. Hispanic or Latino of any race were 1.07% of the population.

There were 1,422 households, out of which 26.8% had children under the age of 18 living with them, 54.4% were married couples living together, 9.1% had a female householder with no husband present, and 31.9% were non-families. 26.6% of all households were made up of individuals, and 13.2% had someone living alone who was 65 years of age or older. The average household size was 2.38 and the average family size was 2.84.

In the township the population was spread out, with 23.8% under the age of 18, 6.1% from 18 to 24, 25.1% from 25 to 44, 26.3% from 45 to 64, and 18.6% who were 65 years of age or older. The median age was 42 years. For every 100 females, there were 98.7 males. For every 100 females age 18 and over, there were 97.1 males.

The median income for a household in the township was $28,148, and the median income for a family was $32,895. Males had a median income of $29,153 versus $20,673 for females. The per capita income for the township was $15,154. About 11.9% of families and 17.2% of the population were below the poverty line, including 23.9% of those under age 18 and 8.8% of those age 65 or over.
