= Mentor Township, Oscoda County, Michigan =

Mentor Township, Michigan
- Civil township
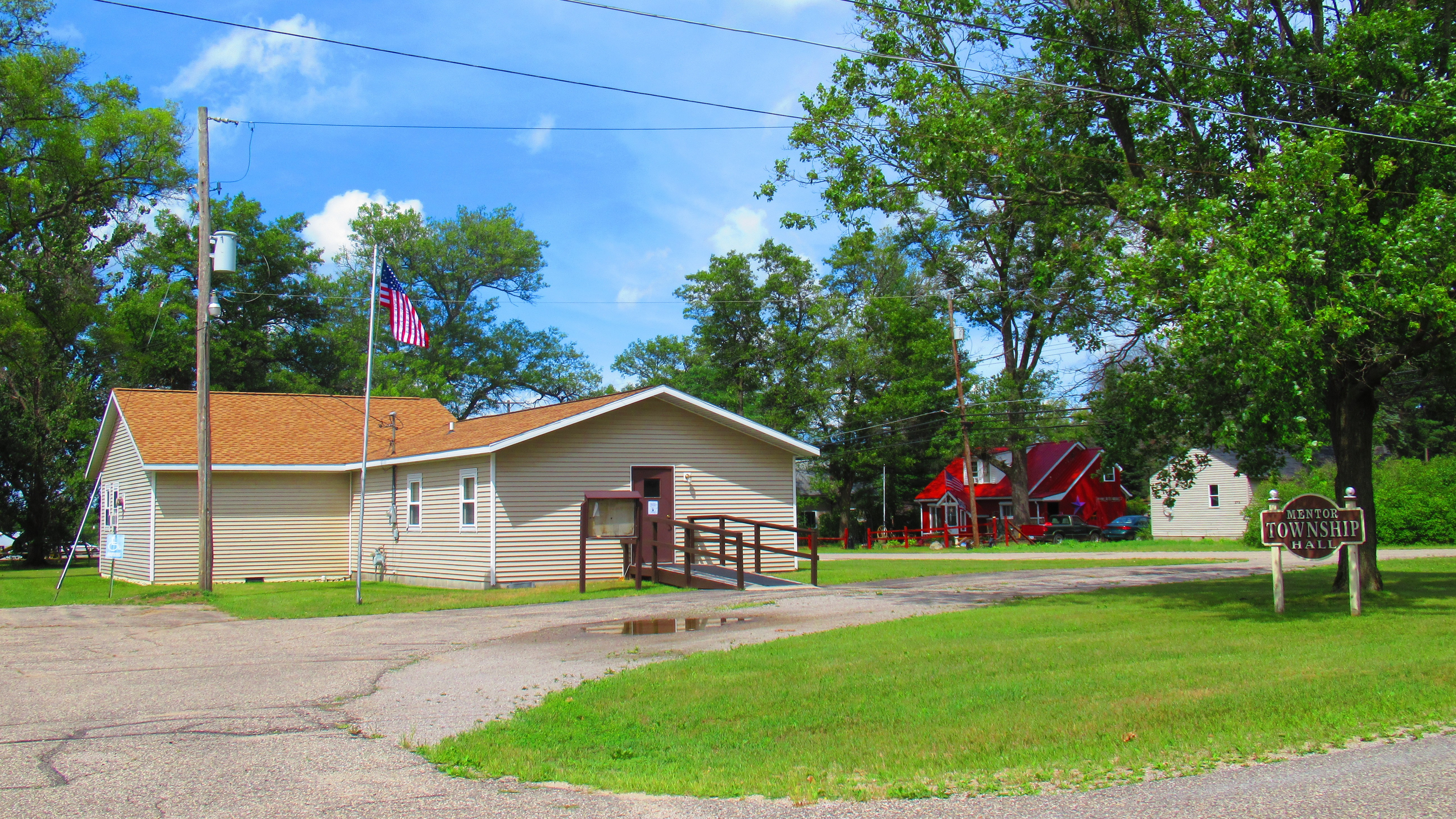
- Mentor Township Hall in Mio

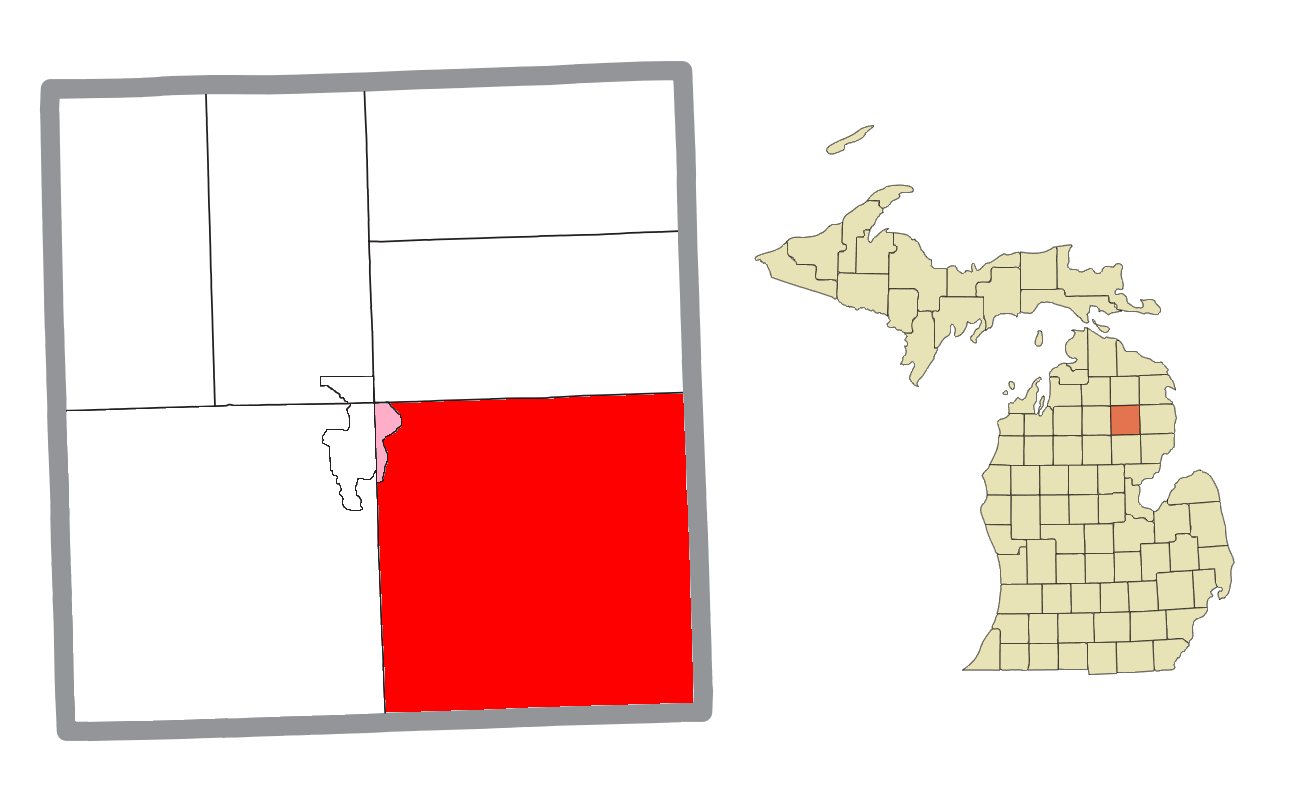
- Location within Oscoda County (red) and an administered portion of the Mio community (pink)

- Location within the state of Michigan Location within the United States
- Coordinates: 44°36′34″N 84°01′15″W
- Country: United States
- State: Michigan
- County: Oscoda
- Established: 1881

Government
  - Supervisor: Gary Wyckoff
  - Clerk: Thomas Galbraith

Area
  - Total: 142.71 sq mi (369.6 km^{2})
  - Land: 142.06 sq mi (367.9 km^{2})
  - Water: 0.65 sq mi (1.7 km^{2})
- Elevation: 1,260 ft (384 m)

Population (2020)
  - Total: 1,037
  - Density: 8.05/sq mi (3.11/km^{2})
- Time zone: UTC-5 (Eastern (EST))
  - Summer (DST): UTC-4 (EDT)
- ZIP code(s): 48621 (Fairview); 48647 (Mio); 48654 (Rose City); 48761 (South Branch)
- Area code: 989
- FIPS code: 26-53120
- GNIS feature ID: 1626726
- Website: Official website

Mentor Township is a civil township of Oscoda County in the U.S. state of Michigan. The population was 1,037 at the 2020 census.

== Communities ==
- McKinley is an unincorporated community in the northeast part of the township along the Au Sable River at 44°38′49″N 83°56′14″W.
- Mio is an unincorporated community and census-designated place in the northwest part of the township along the boundary between Mentor and Big Creek Township. Mio serves as the county seat of Oscoda County.

== Geography ==
According to the United States Census Bureau, the township has a total area of 142.8 square miles (369.8 km^{2}), of which 142.1 square miles (368.0 km^{2}) is land and 0.7 square mile (1.8 km^{2}) (0.49%) is water. The civil township comprises four survey townships: Townships 25 and 26 North in Ranges 3 and 4 East.

== Demographics ==
As of the census of 2000, there were 1,220 people, 553 households, and 374 families residing in the township. The population density was 8.6 inhabitants per square mile (3.3/km^{2}). There were 1,357 housing units at an average density of 9.6 per square mile (3.7/km^{2}). The racial makeup of the township was 96.23% White, 0.08% African American, 1.56% Native American, 0.16% Asian, 0.49% from other races, and 1.48% from two or more races. Hispanic or Latino of any race were 1.89% of the population.

There were 553 households, out of which 21.7% had children under the age of 18 living with them, 55.9% were married couples living together, 8.9% had a female householder with no husband present, and 32.2% were non-families. 27.7% of all households were made up of individuals, and 11.8% had someone living alone who was 65 years of age or older. The average household size was 2.21 and the average family size was 2.65.

In the township the population was spread out, with 19.9% under the age of 18, 5.7% from 18 to 24, 22.1% from 25 to 44, 29.8% from 45 to 64, and 22.5% who were 65 years of age or older. The median age was 46 years. For every 100 females, there were 100.0 males. For every 100 females age 18 and over, there were 95.4 males.

The median income for a household in the township was $26,094, and the median income for a family was $27,784. Males had a median income of $30,000 versus $20,417 for females. The per capita income for the township was $14,392. About 11.2% of families and 14.1% of the population were below the poverty line, including 22.1% of those under age 18 and 6.9% of those age 65 or over.
