= Oscoda County Courthouse =

Building in Mio, Michigan (1889–2016)

- Formerly listed on the U.S. National Register of Historic Places
- Michigan State Historic Site
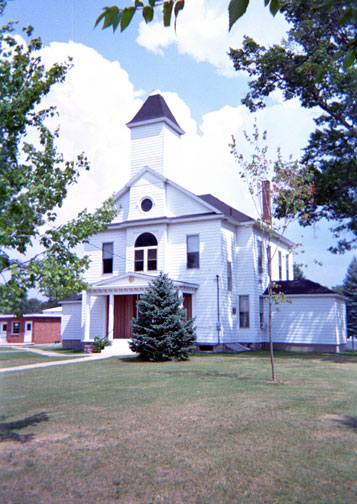
- The courthouse as it appeared before the 2016 fire
- Interactive map
- Location: 311 Morenci Ave., between 10th and 11th
- Coordinates: 44.6493°N 84.1292°W
- Area: less than one acre
- Built: 1888-1889
- Demolished: May 4, 2016
- NRHP reference No.: 72000651

Significant dates
- Added to NRHP: August 25, 1972
- Designated MSHS: August 13, 1971
- Removed from NRHP: June 10, 2023

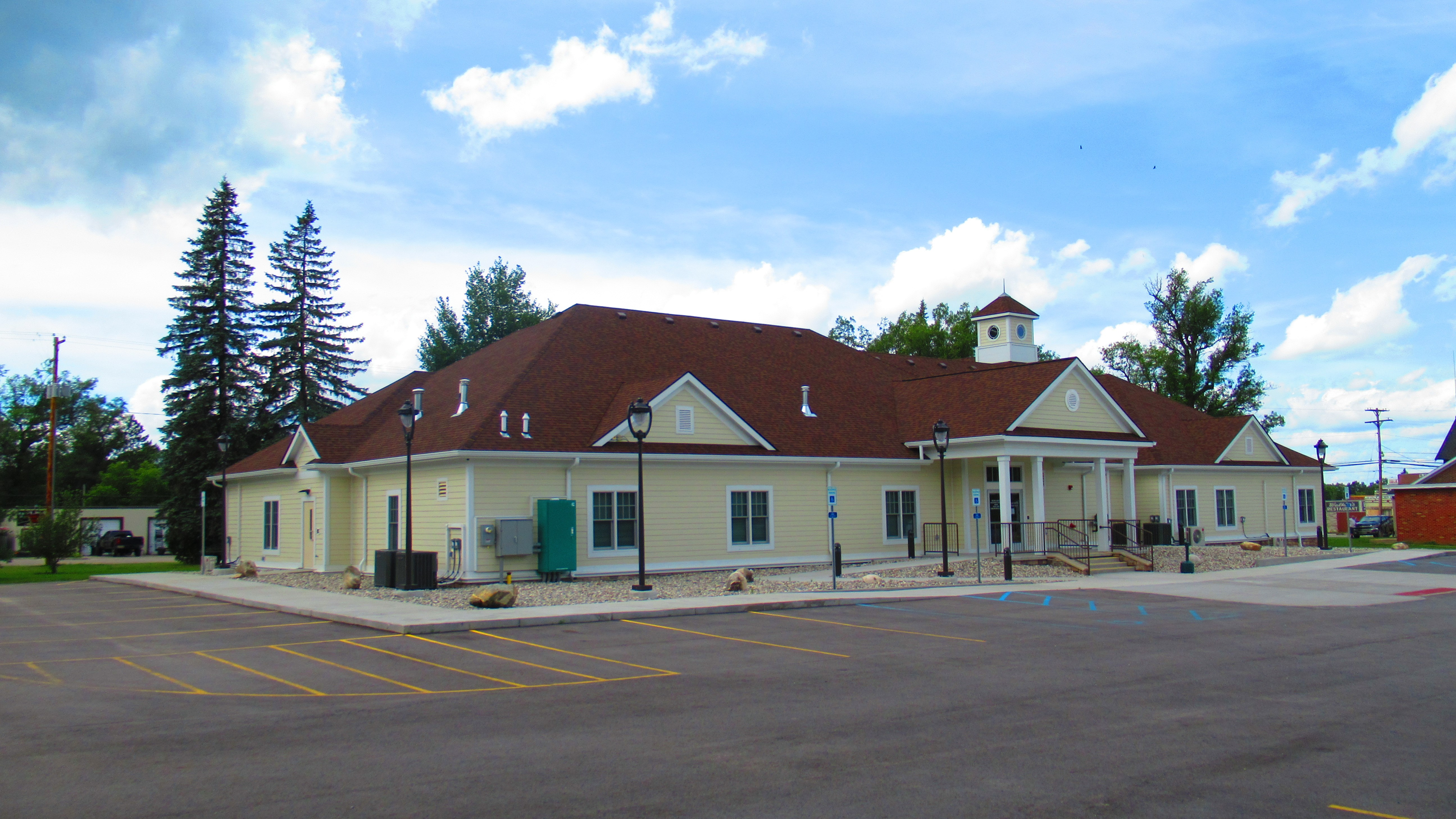
The courthouse after being rebuilt in 2019–2020

The Oscoda County Courthouse was the county courthouse for Oscoda County, Michigan, located in Mio at 311 Morenci Ave (M-33). The courthouse was a Michigan State Historic Site and was listed on the National Register of Historic Places. As of 2012, the courthouse operated courtrooms for the 23rd Circuit Court, 81st District Court, and Oscoda County Probate Court.

The courthouse was destroyed by a fire on the evening of May 4, 2016. Though no longer used as a courthouse, the building housed many of the county's governmental offices. After the fire, temporary mobile offices were erected across the street from the original location to allow for the demolition and disposal of the remaining structure. Construction of the new building officially began on May 20, 2019, and was completed in February 2020.

== History ==
The land the courthouse was built on was purchased by the county in 1885 from John Randall, one of the community's founders, for $100. The courthouse was built by George E. Hunter from July 1888 to May 1889, at a cost of about $3800. Two wings, housing vaults for the county clerk and treasurer, were constructed in 1908. The building gained a water supply in 1891 and was electrified in 1917.

The courthouse was designated a Michigan State Historic Site on August 13, 1971, and added to the National Register of Historic Places on August 25, 1972. A Michigan State Historic Site informational marker was erected in 2001. It burned on May 4, 2016.

== Architecture ==
The courthouse was a two-story, rectangular front-gable building. Clad in aluminum, the building originally had white clapboard siding. The building was fronted by a projected bay, topped with a hip-roofed steeple. The entrance was fronted by a pedimented portico, beneath a fanlight on the second story. One-story wings extended from both sides of the courthouse.

The courthouse was designed by architects Pratt and Koeppe in the Classical Revival style. Unlike the stone and brick courthouses commonly built at the time, the Oscoda County Courthouse was a modest wood-frame building.

== See also ==
- National Register of Historic Places listings in Michigan#Oscoda County
- List of Michigan State Historic Sites in Oscoda County, Michigan
