= Oscoda County, Michigan =

County in Michigan, United States

- County
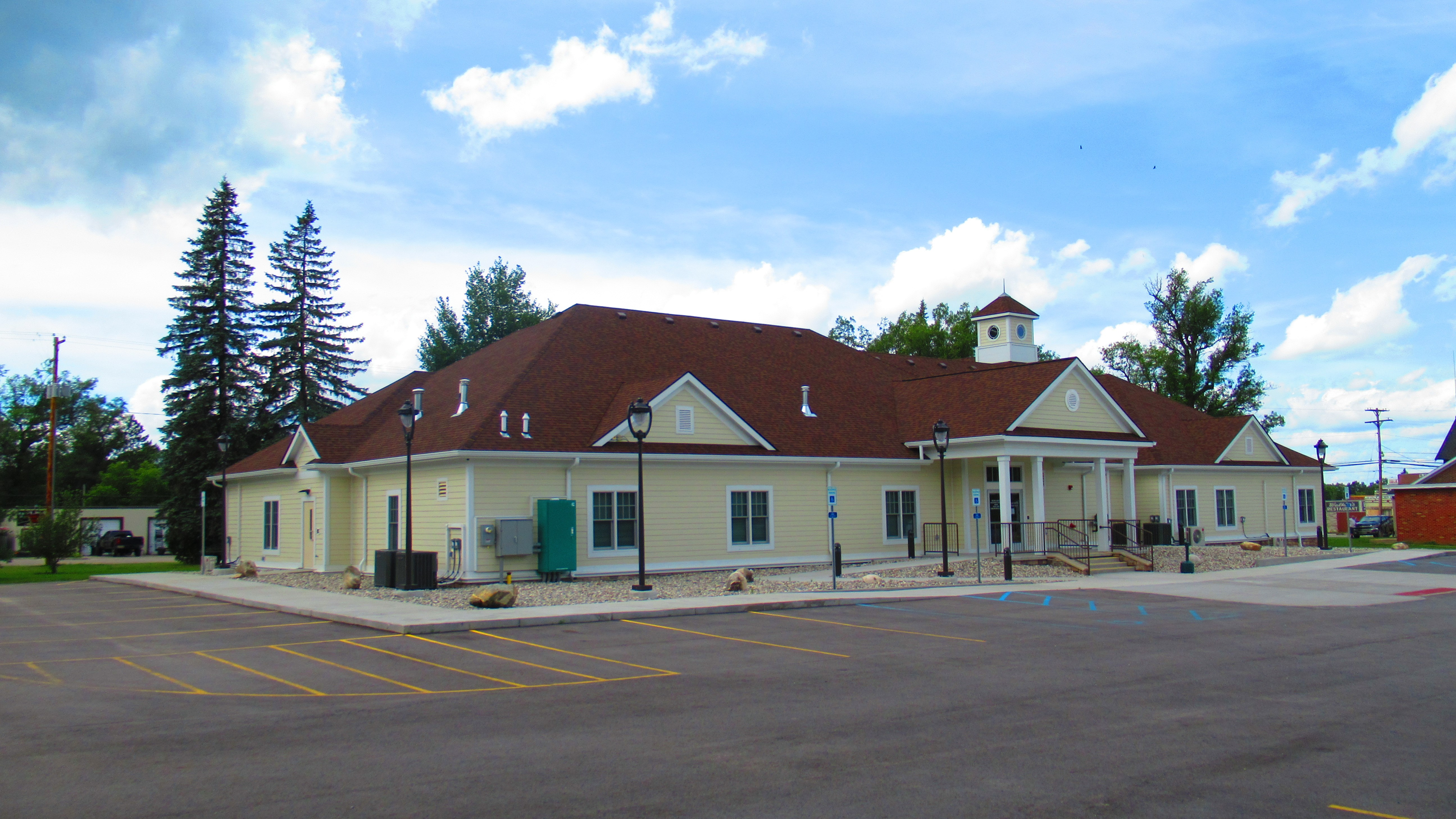
- The rebuilt Oscoda County Courthouse in Mio

- Location within the U.S. state of Michigan
- Coordinates: 44°41′N 84°08′W
- Country: United States
- State: Michigan
- Founded: April 1, 1840 (created); 1881 (organized)
- Seat: Mio
- Largest community: Mio

Area
  - Total: 572 sq mi (1,480 km^{2})
  - Land: 566 sq mi (1,470 km^{2})
  - Water: 5.9 sq mi (15 km^{2}) 1.0%

Population (2020)
  - Total: 8,219
  - Estimate (2025): 8,723 ▲
  - Density: 15/sq mi (5.8/km^{2})
- Time zone: UTC−5 (Eastern)
  - Summer (DST): UTC−4 (EDT)
- Congressional district: 1st
- Website: oscodacountymi.com

Oscoda County (/ɒˈskoʊdə/ ah-SKOH-də) is a county in the U.S. state of Michigan. As of the 2020 census, the population was 8,219, making it the least populous county in the Lower Peninsula, and the sixth-least populous county in the entire state. The county seat is Mio, an unincorporated community near the center of the county.

== History ==
The county was established on April 1, 1840, by act of the Michigan State legislature. However, its governing structure was not completed until 1881. The name is a Henry Rowe Schoolcraft neologism, thought to be a combination of two Ojibwa words, "ossin" (stone) and "muskoda" (prairie) – hence 'pebbly prairie.' He served as the US Indian agent and was also a geographer, surveying and naming newly established counties and towns.

== Geography ==
According to the U.S. Census Bureau, the county has an area of 572 square miles (1,480 km^{2}), of which 566 square miles (1,470 km^{2}) is land and 5.9 square miles (15 km^{2}) (1.0%) is water. Oscoda County is part of Northern Michigan.

=== Geographic features ===
- Mio is situated in the Au Sable River Valley.
- The southern half of the county is within the Huron National Forest.
- The county is part of the Au Sable State Forest, specifically the Grayling Fire Management Unit, which consists of Alcona, Crawford, Oscoda, and northern Iosco counties.
- Much of the area sits on the "Grayling outwash plain", a unique habitat.
- The Oscoda County Park offers a good vantage point.

Glaciers shaped the area, creating a unique regional ecosystem. Much of the area is the Grayling outwash plain, a broad outwash plain including sandy ice-disintegration ridges, jack pine barrens, white pine-red pine forest, and northern hardwood forest. Large lakes were created by glacial action.

=== Major highways ===
- M-33 – runs north–south through the central part of the county. Passes Fairview and Mio.
- M-72 – enters west end of county near its central part. Runs east to intersection with M-33 at Mio. Passes Luzerne. It is one of three true cross peninsular highways.
- F-32 – runs east from Mio into Alcona County. Passes McKinley.

=== Adjacent counties ===
- Montmorency County - north
- Alpena County - northeast
- Alcona County - east
- Iosco County - southeast
- Ogemaw County - south
- Roscommon County - southwest
- Crawford County - west
- Otsego County - northwest

=== National protected area ===
- Huron National Forest (part)

== Communities ==
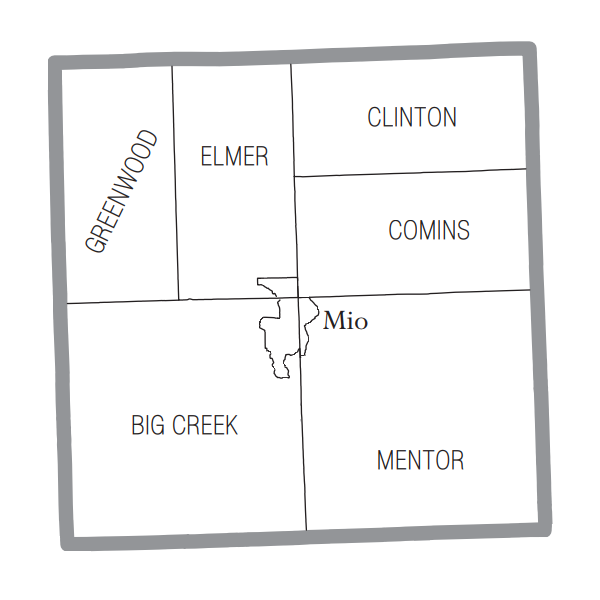
U.S. Census data map showing local municipal boundaries within Oscoda County, as well as the CDP of Mio

Oscoda County is the only county in Michigan with no incorporated communities.

=== Civil townships ===
- Big Creek Township
- Clinton Township
- Comins Township
- Elmer Township
- Greenwood Township
- Mentor Township

=== Census-designated place ===
- Mio (county seat)

=== Other unincorporated communities ===
- Biggs Settlement
- Comins
- Fairview
- Kneeland
- Luzerne
- McKinley
- Red Oak

=== Ghost towns ===
- Dew
- Hardy
- Indian Lake
- Mack City
- McCollum
- Odessa
- Royce
- Ryno
- Spoor
- Tyrell
- Wood

== Demographics ==
Historical population
Census	Pop.	Note	%±
1870	70		—
1880	467		567.1%
1890	1,904		307.7%
1900	1,468		−22.9%
1910	2,027		38.1%
1920	1,783		−12.0%
1930	1,728		−3.1%
1940	2,543		47.2%
1950	3,134		23.2%
1960	3,447		10.0%
1970	4,726		37.1%
1980	6,858		45.1%
1990	7,842		14.3%
2000	9,418		20.1%
2010	8,640		−8.3%
2020	8,219		−4.9%
2025 (est.)	8,723	▲	6.1%
US Decennial Census; 1790-1960 1900-1990; 1990-2000 2010-2018

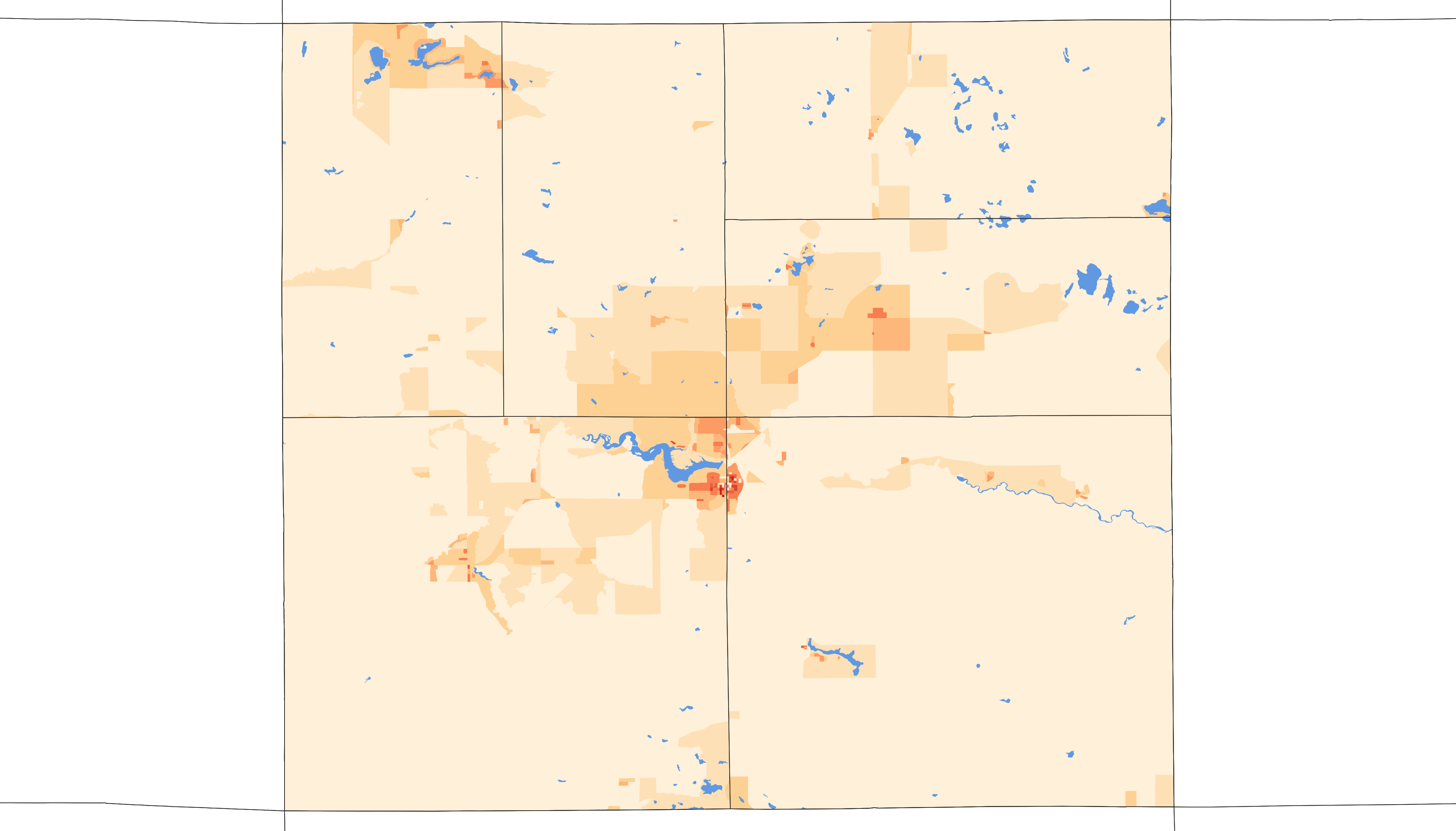
2020 population density of Oscoda County MI by census block

=== Racial and ethnic composition ===
Oscoda County, Michigan – Racial and ethnic composition Note: the US Census treats Hispanic/Latino as an ethnic category. This table excludes Latinos from the racial categories and assigns them to a separate category. Hispanics/Latinos may be of any race.
Race / Ethnicity (NH = Non-Hispanic)	Pop 1980	Pop 1990	Pop 2000	Pop 2010	Pop 2020	% 1980	% 1990	% 2000	% 2010	% 2020
White alone (NH)	6,807	7,741	9,162	8,380	7,684	99.26%	98.71%	97.28%	96.99%	93.49%
Black or African American alone (NH)	1	2	8	14	8	0.01%	0.03%	0.08%	0.16%	0.10%
Native American or Alaska Native alone (NH)	30	41	60	46	34	0.44%	0.52%	0.64%	0.53%	0.41%
Asian alone (NH)	2	5	6	7	5	0.03%	0.06%	0.06%	0.08%	0.06%
Native Hawaiian or Pacific Islander alone (NH)	x	x	1	3	0	x	x	0.01%	0.03%	0.00%
Other race alone (NH)	8	3	0	2	11	0.12%	0.04%	0.00%	0.02%	0.13%
Mixed race or Multiracial (NH)	x	x	92	109	323	x	x	0.98%	1.26%	3.93%
Hispanic or Latino (any race)	10	50	89	79	154	0.15%	0.64%	0.94%	0.91%	1.87%
Total	6,858	7,842	9,418	8,640	8,219	100.00%	100.00%	100.00%	100.00%	100.00%

=== 2020 census ===
As of the 2020 census, the county had a population of 8,219. The median age was 53.8 years, with 18.1% of residents under the age of 18 and 29.7% of residents 65 years of age or older. For every 100 females there were 105.8 males, and for every 100 females age 18 and over there were 104.2 males age 18 and over.

The racial makeup of the county was 94.2% White, 0.1% Black or African American, 0.5% American Indian and Alaska Native, 0.1% Asian, <0.1% Native Hawaiian and Pacific Islander, 0.3% from some other race, and 4.8% from two or more races. Hispanic or Latino residents of any race comprised 1.9% of the population.

<0.1% of residents lived in urban areas, while 100.0% lived in rural areas.

There were 3,732 households in the county, of which 19.9% had children under the age of 18 living in them. Of all households, 48.2% were married-couple households, 23.1% were households with a male householder and no spouse or partner present, and 22.7% were households with a female householder and no spouse or partner present. About 33.6% of all households were made up of individuals and 17.9% had someone living alone who was 65 years of age or older.

There were 7,649 housing units, of which 51.2% were vacant. Among occupied housing units, 84.0% were owner-occupied and 16.0% were renter-occupied. The homeowner vacancy rate was 2.3% and the rental vacancy rate was 16.1%.

=== 2000 census ===
At the 2000 United States census, 9,418 people, 3,921 households, and 2,717 families resided in the county. The population density was 17 people per square mile (6.6 people/km^{2}). There were 8,690 housing units at an average density of 15 per square mile (5.8/km^{2}).

In 2000, the county's racial makeup was 97.82% White, 0.08% Black or African American, 0.71% Native American, 0.07% Asian, 0.01% Pacific Islander, 0.14% from other races, and 1.16% from two or more races. 0.94% of the population were Hispanic or Latino of any race. 30.2% were of German, 12.8% American, 9.6% English, 8.1% Polish, 6.8% French and 6.7% Irish ancestry. 94.1% spoke English, 2.8% German and 1.5% Pennsylvania Dutch as their first language.

In 2000, there were 3,921 households, out of which 25.30% had children under the age of 18 living with them, 58.10% were married couples living together, 7.50% had a female householder with no husband present, and 30.70% were non-families. 26.00% of all households were made up of individuals, and 12.70% had someone living alone who was 65 years of age or older. The average household size was 2.39 and the average family size was 2.85. The county population contained 23.30% under the age of 18, 5.60% from 18 to 24, 22.80% from 25 to 44, 28.00% from 45 to 64, and 20.20% who were 65 years of age or older. The median age was 44 years. For every 100 females there were 96.40 males. For every 100 females age 18 and over, there were 95.30 males.

As of 2000, the median income for a household in the county was $28,228, and the median income for a family was $32,225. Males had a median income of $30,013 versus $20,202 for females. The per capita income for the county was $15,697. About 10.30% of families and 14.60% of the population were below the poverty line, including 20.40% of those under age 18 and 8.80% of those age 65 or over.

== Government ==
Oscoda County has been reliably Republican since its organization. Since 1884, the Republican Party nominee has carried the county vote in 86% (31 of 36) of the national elections through 2024.

United States presidential election results for Oscoda County, Michigan
Year	Republican		Democratic		Third party(ies)	
Year	No.	%	No.	%	No.	%
1884	199	68.62%	87	30.00%	4	1.38%
1888	277	47.19%	299	50.94%	11	1.87%
1892	273	59.09%	180	38.96%	9	1.95%
1896	308	80.84%	63	16.54%	10	2.62%
1900	245	79.80%	60	19.54%	2	0.65%
1904	323	86.13%	44	11.73%	8	2.13%
1908	331	72.75%	112	24.62%	12	2.64%
1912	110	32.45%	66	19.47%	163	48.08%
1916	245	56.98%	175	40.70%	10	2.33%
1920	439	83.78%	75	14.31%	10	1.91%
1924	389	82.24%	52	10.99%	32	6.77%
1928	476	86.39%	73	13.25%	2	0.36%
1932	410	52.90%	349	45.03%	16	2.06%
1936	456	47.70%	492	51.46%	8	0.84%
1940	661	61.60%	409	38.12%	3	0.28%
1944	615	64.74%	332	34.95%	3	0.32%
1948	785	72.08%	285	26.17%	19	1.74%
1952	1,047	80.72%	246	18.97%	4	0.31%
1956	1,044	78.03%	294	21.97%	0	0.00%
1960	1,174	71.85%	458	28.03%	2	0.12%
1964	784	45.55%	930	54.04%	7	0.41%
1968	1,124	60.95%	563	30.53%	157	8.51%
1972	1,561	67.61%	678	29.36%	70	3.03%
1976	1,541	57.56%	1,108	41.39%	28	1.05%
1980	1,915	55.25%	1,325	38.23%	226	6.52%
1984	2,239	69.77%	951	29.64%	19	0.59%
1988	1,972	62.27%	1,170	36.94%	25	0.79%
1992	1,583	41.32%	1,471	38.40%	777	20.28%
1996	1,545	41.48%	1,652	44.35%	528	14.17%
2000	2,207	55.29%	1,677	42.01%	108	2.71%
2004	2,570	58.29%	1,792	40.64%	47	1.07%
2008	2,320	53.38%	1,887	43.42%	139	3.20%
2012	2,308	56.95%	1,657	40.88%	88	2.17%
2016	2,843	69.48%	1,044	25.51%	205	5.01%
2020	3,466	71.02%	1,342	27.50%	72	1.48%
2024	3,716	71.57%	1,414	27.23%	62	1.19%

United States Senate election results for Oscoda County, Michigan1
Year	Republican		Democratic		Third party(ies)	
Year	No.	%	No.	%	No.	%
2024	3,500	69.01%	1,388	27.37%	184	3.63%

Michigan Gubernatorial election results for Oscoda County
Year	Republican		Democratic		Third party(ies)	
Year	No.	%	No.	%	No.	%
2022	2,553	63.63%	1,355	33.77%	104	2.59%

Oscoda County operates the county jail, maintains rural roads, operates the major local courts, records deeds, mortgages, and vital records, administers public health regulations, and participates with the state in the provision of social services. The county board of commissioners controls the budget and has limited authority to make laws or ordinances. In Michigan, most local government functions – police and fire, building and zoning, tax assessment, street maintenance, etc. – are the responsibility of individual cities and townships.

=== Elected officials ===
- Prosecuting Attorney – Kristi Mcgregor
- Sheriff – Kevin R. Grace
- County Clerk/Register of Deeds – Ann Galbraith
- County Treasurer – William Kendall
- Commissioner Dist. 1 – Chuck Varner (Chairman)
- Commissioner Dist. 2 – Tom McCauley
- Commissioner Dist. 3 – Jackie Bondar
- Commissioner Dist. 4 – Ted Handrich
- Commissioner Dist. 5 – Libby Marsh

current as of January 2022

== Recreation ==
The AuSable River, near Mio, provides opportunity for fishing, canoeing, kayaking, or tubing. The M-33 access north of Mio has a launch area and public facilities. A second launch area is at the Mio Dam Pond.

Oscoda County offers snowmobile trails, ATV trails, hiking trails, and cross country skiing trails. Snowmobile and ATV trails are located throughout Luzerne, McKinley, and Mio. There is a scramble area at Bull Gap in the Huron National Forest. The Loud Creek Trail offers 7 different routes with varying difficulty levels. The trail's total distance is 10 kilometers.

In Fairview, there is a horseback riding ranch and a golf course. Karefree Ranch Boarding Stables offers guided horseback rides in Huron National Forest. The Fairview Hills Golf Club is a 9-hole golf course on M-33.

== See also ==
- List of Michigan State Historic Sites in Oscoda County, Michigan
- National Register of Historic Places listings in Oscoda County, Michigan
- Michigan AuSable Valley Railroad
