= Comins Township, Michigan =

- Civil township
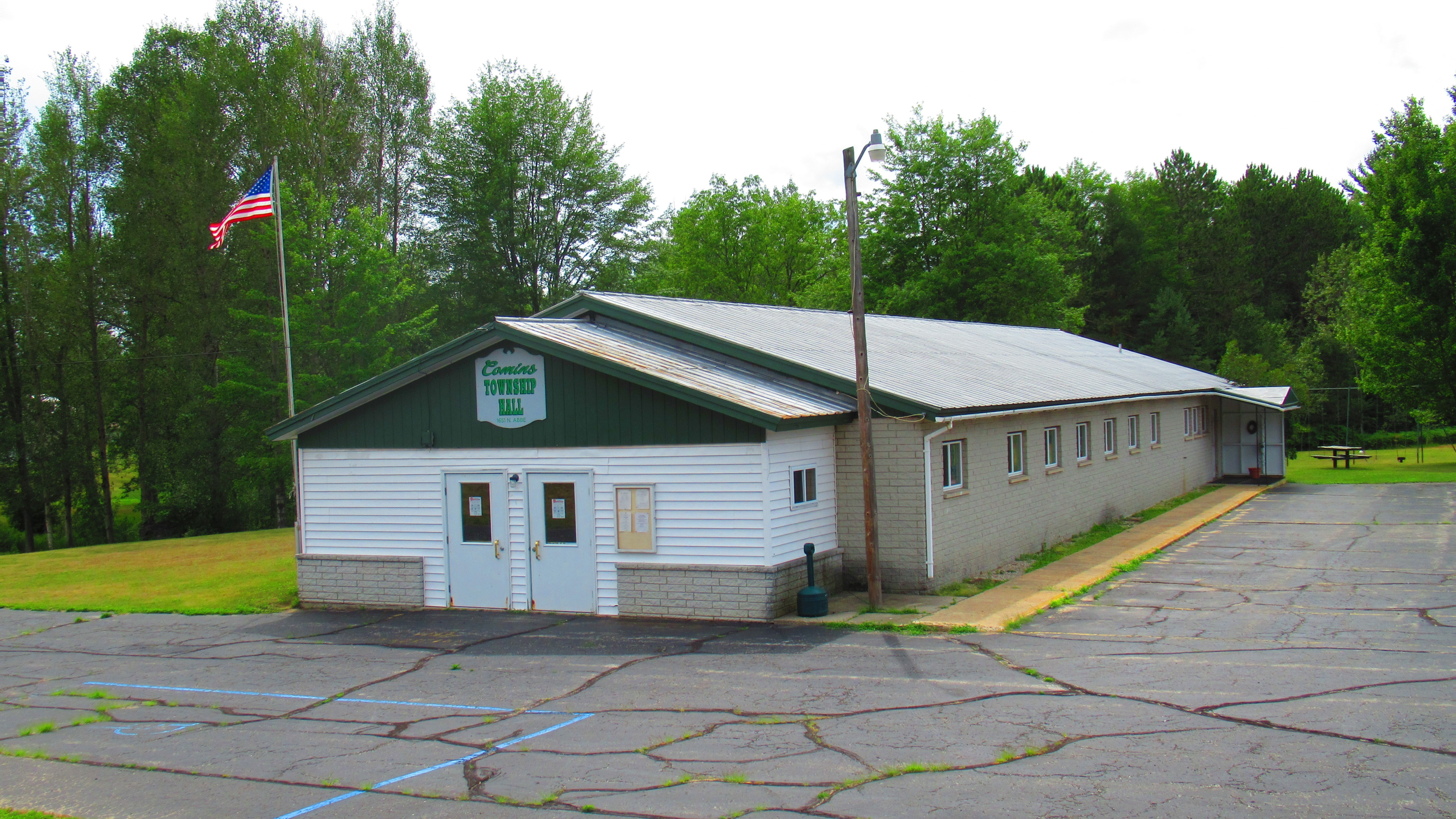
- Comins Township Hall

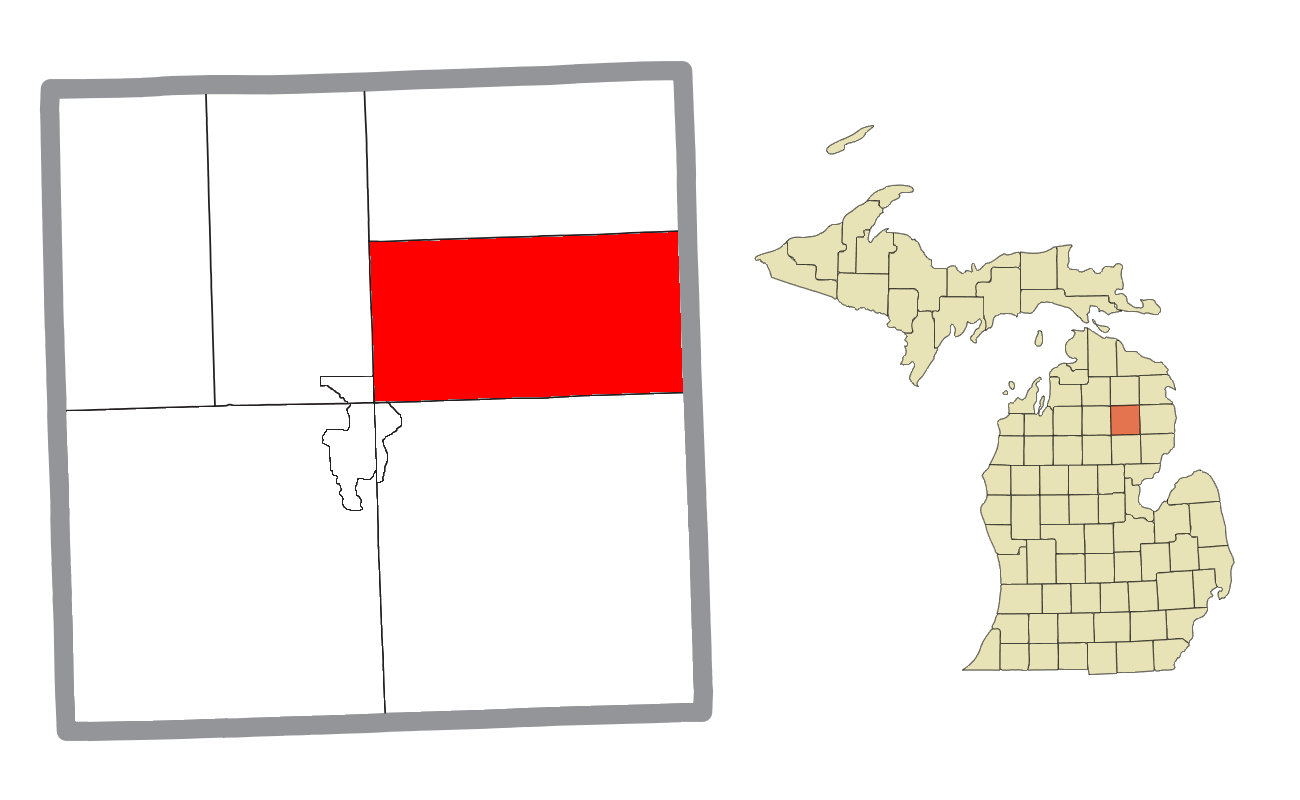
- Location within Oscoda County

- Location within the state of Michigan Location within the United States
- Coordinates: 44°43′53″N 84°00′37″W
- Country: United States
- State: Michigan
- County: Oscoda
- Established: 1869

Government
  - Supervisor: Lori Lewis
  - Clerk: Amanda Barajas

Area
  - Total: 71.80 sq mi (185.96 km^{2})
  - Land: 70.56 sq mi (182.75 km^{2})
  - Water: 1.24 sq mi (3.21 km^{2})
- Elevation: 1,125 ft (343 m)

Population (2020)
  - Total: 1,839
  - Density: 26.1/sq mi (10.1/km^{2})
- Time zone: UTC-5 (Eastern (EST))
  - Summer (DST): UTC-4 (EDT)
- ZIP code(s): 48619 (Comins); 48621 (Fairview); 48647 (Mio); 48728 (Curran)
- Area code: 989
- FIPS code: 26-17600
- GNIS feature ID: 1626124
- Website: Official website

Comins Township is a civil township of Oscoda County in the U.S. state of Michigan. The population was 1,839 at the 2020 census.

== Communities ==
- Biggs Settlement is an unincorporated community located along the township line with Elmer Township at 44°42′37″N 84°07′48″W. Also known as Biggs, the community had its own post office from December 12, 1891 until September 30, 1912.
- Fairview is an unincorporated community located within the township at 44°43′30″N 84°03′04″W.
- Kneeland is an unincorporated community located within the township at 44°42′38″N 84°05′29″W. The community began with a rural post office that opened on December 22, 1905 with Enos Frame serving as the first postmaster. The rural post office operated until September 30, 1912.

== Geography ==
According to the U.S. Census Bureau, the township has a total area of 71.80 square miles (185.96 km^{2}), of which 70.56 square miles (182.75 km^{2}) is land and 1.24 square miles (3.21 km^{2}) (1.72%) is water.

=== Major highways ===
- M-33 runs through the western portion of the township.
- M-72 runs through the township and concurrently with M-33 west of Fairview.
- F-32 runs briefly concurrently with M-33 along the western border of the township.

== Demographics ==
In 2000, the township was home to 2,017 people, 785 households and 558 families. The population density was 28.6 inhabitants per square mile (11.0/km^{2}). There were 1,199 housing units at an average density of 17.0 per square mile (6.6/km^{2}). The racial makeup of the township was 98.51% White, 0.10% African American, 0.69% Native American, 0.10% from other races, and 0.59% from two or more races. Hispanic or Latino of any race were 0.25% of the population.

Of the 785 households, 27.3% had children under the age of 18 living with them, 61.1% were married couples living together, 6.9% had a female householder with no husband present, and 28.9% were non-families. Individuals constituted 25.7% of all households and 14.4% had someone living alone who was 65 years of age or older. The average household size was 2.49 and the average family size was 2.98.

The populations age distribution was: 25.1% under the age of 18, 4.8% from 18 to 24, 20.9% from 25 to 44, 27.5% from 45 to 64, and 21.7% who were 65 years of age or older. The median age was 44 years. For every 100 females, there were 86.9 males. For every 100 females at the age of 18 and over, there were 86.3 males.

The median income for a household in the township was $28,750, and the median income for a family was $34,034. Males had a median income of $29,808 versus $19,886 for females. The per capita income for the township was $14,813. About 7.9% of families and 13.2% of the population were below the poverty line, including 18.4% of those under age 18 and 10.8% of those age 65 or over.

== See also ==
- Michigan AuSable Valley Railroad, headquartered in Fairview, operated from 1994–2017.
