= Luzerne, Michigan =

- Unincorporated community
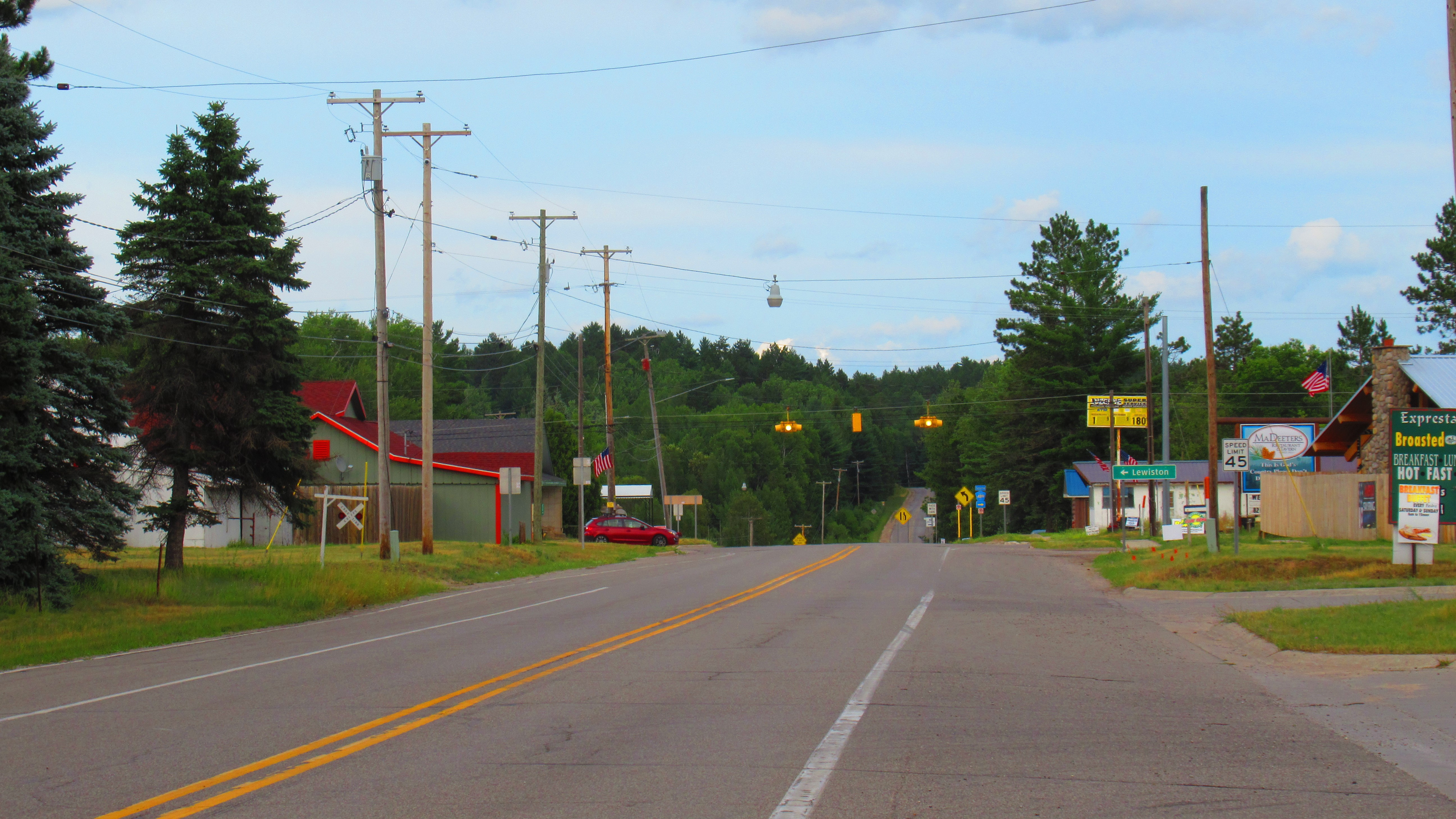
- Community of Luzerne along M-72
- Motto: "Little town with a big heart"
- Location within the state of Michigan Location within the United States
- Coordinates: 44°36′57″N 84°16′16″W
- Country: United States
- State: Michigan
- County: Oscoda
- Township: Big Creek
- Established: 1881
- Elevation: 1,079 ft (329 m)
- Time zone: UTC-5 (Eastern (EST))
  - Summer (DST): UTC-4 (EDT)
- ZIP code(s): 48636
- Area code: 989
- GNIS feature ID: 1620650

Luzerne (/luˈzɜːrn/ lew-zurn) is an unincorporated community in Oscoda County in the U.S. state of Michigan. The community is located within Big Creek Township. As an unincorporated community, Luzerne has no legally defined boundaries or population statistics of its own but does have its own post office with the 48636 ZIP Code.

== Geography ==
The community is centered along M-72 and County Road 489 (Deeter Road) in southwestern Oscoda County about 6 miles (9.7 km) southwest of the community of Mio. It is located within the Huron National Forest about 20 miles (32.2 km) east of the city of Grayling. The community sits at an elevation of 1,079 feet (329 m) above sea level.

The East Branch Big Creek, a tributary of the Au Sable River, flows through the community with a small impoundment known as Luzerne Pond along its route. The Lost Creek Airport is located within the Luzerne area.

Luzerne uses its own post office with the 48636 ZIP Code, which covers most of the western portion of Big Creek Township, as well as smaller portions of Foster Township (Ogemaw County) to the south and South Branch Township (Crawford County) to the west.

== History ==
Luzerne was first settled when Myran Hagaman and his family moved to the area from Luzerne, Pennsylvania in 1881. A post office was established on November 4, 1881 under the name Luzerne, and Hagaman served as the first postmaster. The post office has remained in operation and is currently located at 2289 Royce Avenue. Luzerne also has its own volunteer fire department located at 2284 Deeter Road, as well as the Luzerne Cemetery used by the township.

Luzerne is served by Mio-Ausable Schools centered in the community of Mio just to the northeast.

== Images ==
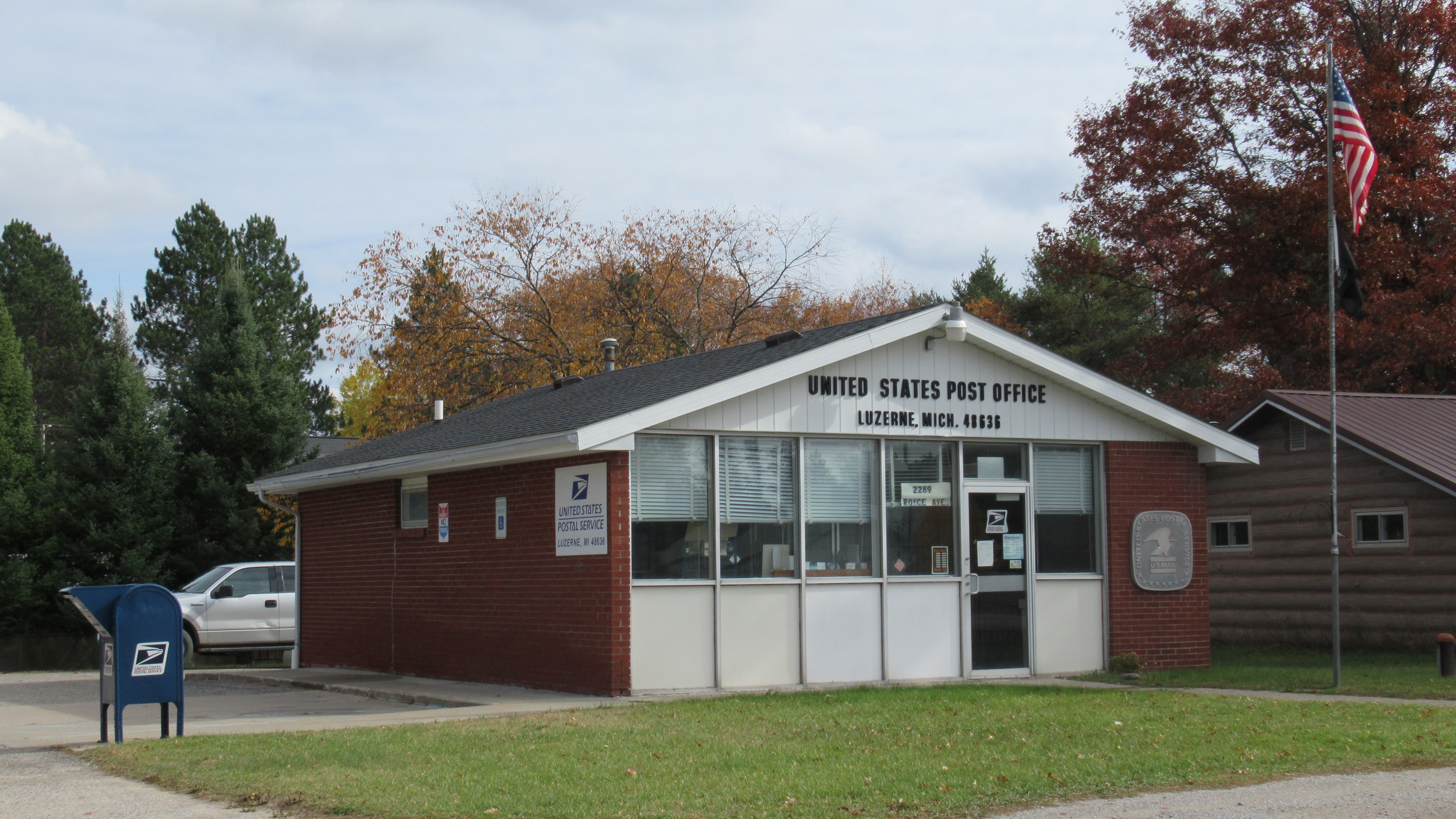
U.S. Post Office in Luzerne

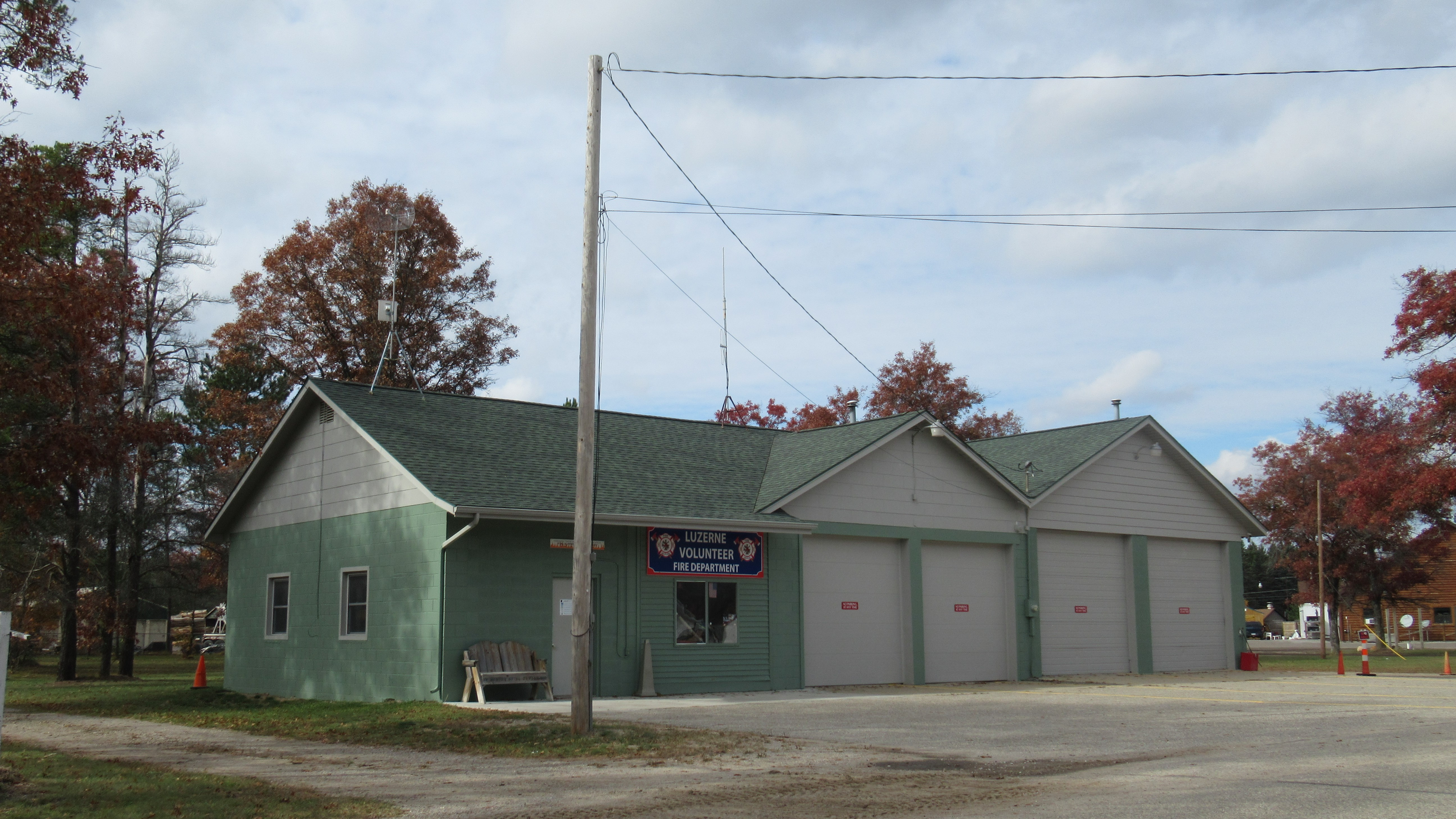
Luzerne Volunteer Fire Department

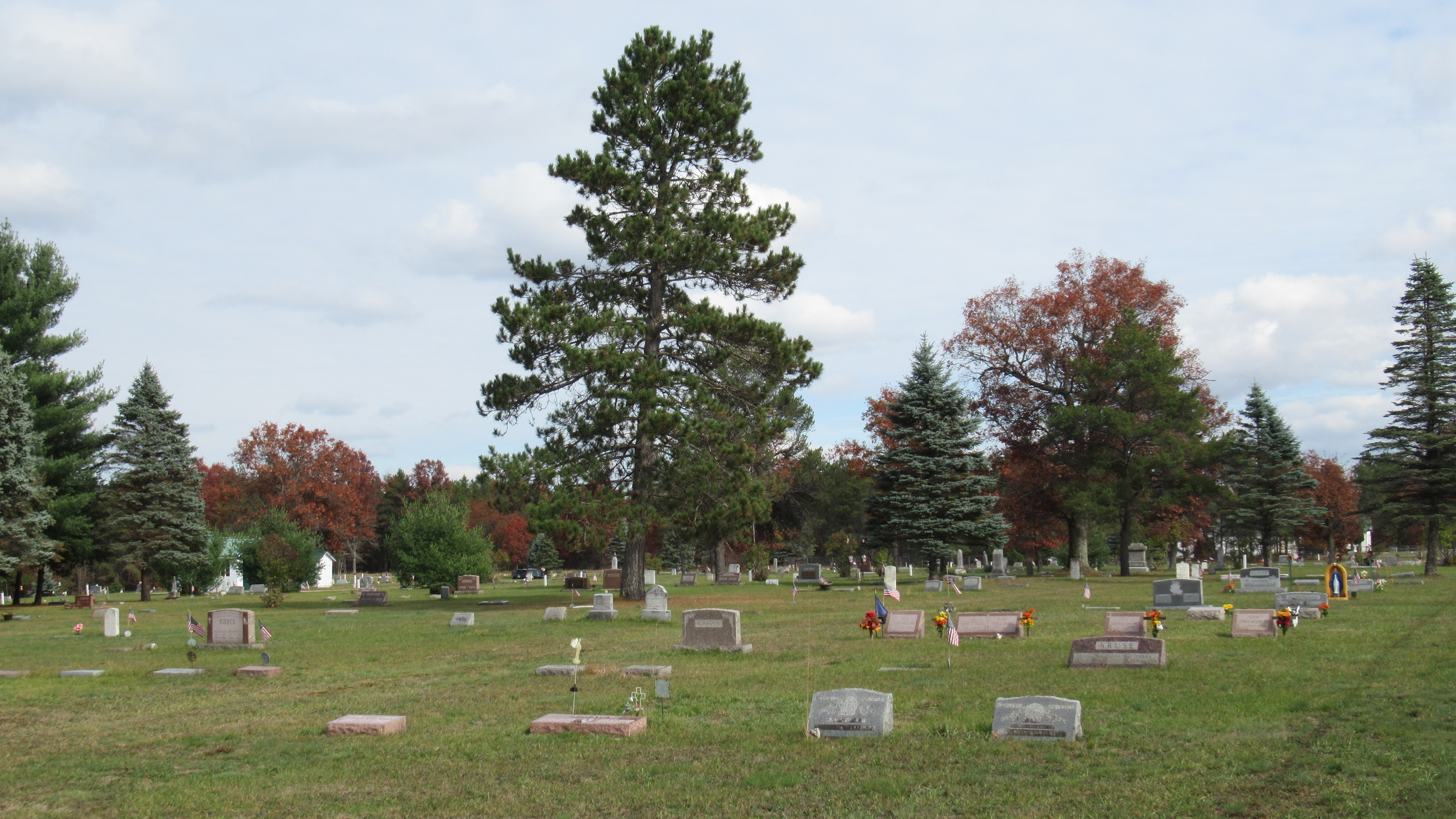
Luzerne Cemetery
