= Mio, Michigan =

- Census-designated place (CDP) & unincorporated community
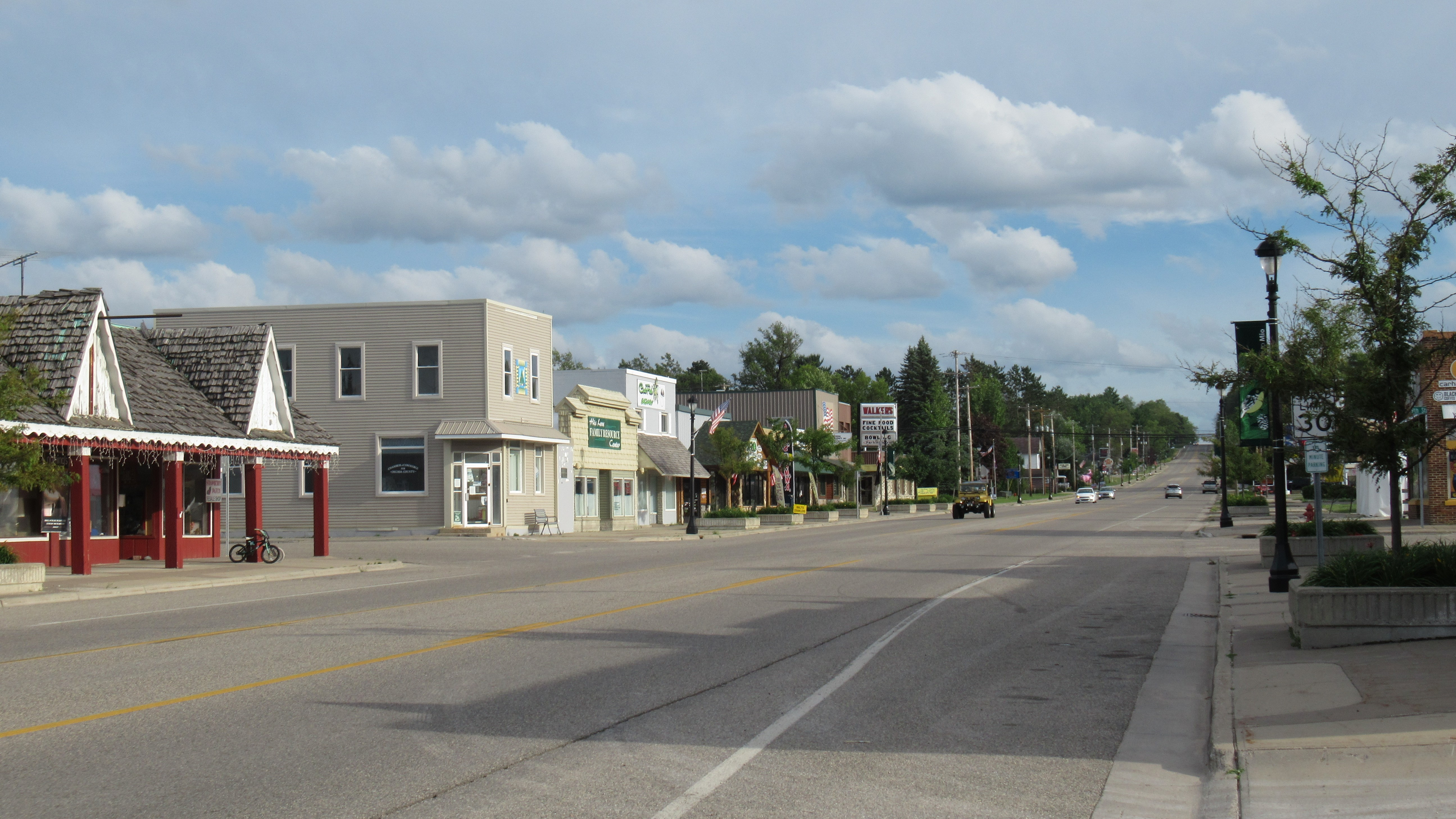
- Community looking south along M-33

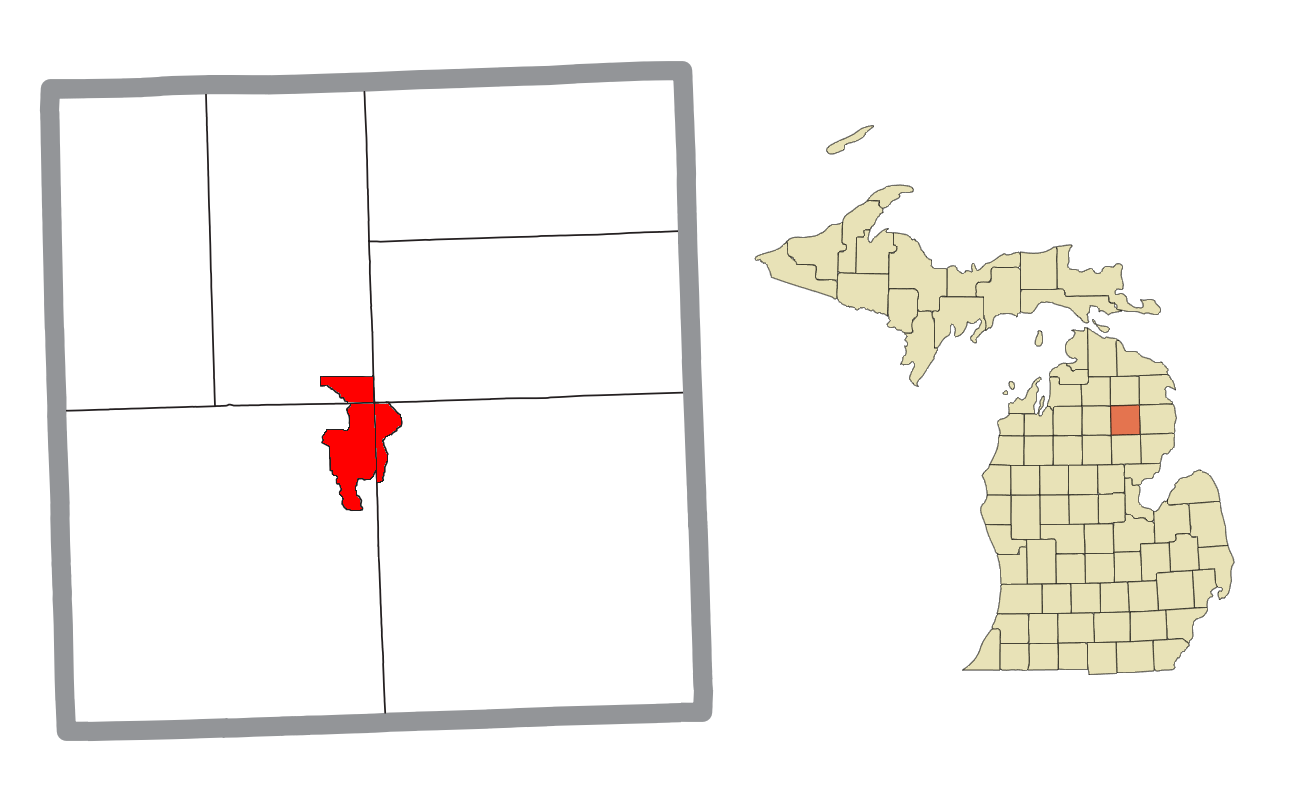
- Location within Oscoda County

- Location within the state of Michigan Location within the United States
- Coordinates: 44°39′08″N 84°07′47″W
- Country: United States
- State: Michigan
- County: Oscoda
- Townships: Big Creek, Elmer, and Mentor
- Founded: 1881

Area
  - Total: 8.98 sq mi (23.26 km^{2})
  - Land: 8.37 sq mi (21.67 km^{2})
  - Water: 0.61 sq mi (1.59 km^{2})
- Elevation: 1,020 ft (311 m)

Population (2020)
  - Total: 1,690
  - Density: 201.91/sq mi (77.96/km^{2})
- Time zone: UTC-5 (Eastern (EST))
  - Summer (DST): UTC-4 (EDT)
- ZIP code(s): 48647
- Area code: 989
- FIPS code: 26-54660
- GNIS feature ID: 1620853

Mio (/ˈmaɪoʊ/ MY-oh) is an unincorporated community and census-designated place (CDP) in Oscoda County in the U.S. state of Michigan. It is the county seat of Oscoda County. The population of the CDP was 1,690 at the 2020 census.

Mio is situated along the boundary between Mentor Township on the east, Big Creek Township on the west, and Elmer Township to the northwest. As an unincorporated community, Mio has no legal autonomy as an incorporated municipality.

== History ==
The community was founded in 1881 and was originally called "Mioe", the nickname of Marla Deyarmond, the wife of town founder Henry Deyarmond. Other founders included Colige Comins, Reirlo Fosdick, and John Randall. A post office named Mioe opened May 3, 1882. The name changed to Mio on November 21, 1883.

=== State high temperature record ===
Mio holds the state record for the highest recorded temperature, when it reached 112 °F (44 °C) on July 13, 1936. An identical temperature was also recorded on the same day in the village of Stanwood, in Mecosta County.

=== PBB contamination event ===
In 1973, a polybrominated biphenyl (PBB) contamination event caused farmers in the area to destroy their herds. This event occurred when a dock worker accidentally shipped five hundred pounds of fire retardant Fire Master instead of the feed supplement Nutrimaster, leading to the contamination of various farm animals, including cows, pigs, chickens, and sheep. Shortly after, the farmers noticed deformities and sickness among their livestock and newborn calves. More than 35,000 cows were found to be contaminated and had to be destroyed. Out of these, 1,300 were dumped into a clay-lined pit in Mio. As of 2014, PBB is still detectable in the blood tests of some people in this area.

=== Detroit-area hunters murdered ===
For nearly eighteen years, Mio was thrust into the local and national media spotlight due to a case involving two Detroit-area hunters who went missing in the fall of 1985. Progress in the investigation was stymied by area residents' refusal to help, citing fears of violent reprisal. On November 21, 1985, childhood friends David Tyll and Brian Ognjan were beaten to death with baseball bats outside of a local bar. The case was eventually cracked in 2003, when two brothers, Raymond and Donald Duvall, both from South Branch, in Iosco County, were convicted of murdering the pair near Mio. It was rumored that the murderers had disposed of the bodies by feeding them to pigs. When the two brothers were sentenced to life in prison without parole, Tyll's father said, "They took my son. It doesn't bring him back, but it's something." A true account of the crimes was detailed in Darker Than Night, a 2006 book by Tom Henderson.

=== Historical markers ===
There are two historical markers in Mio.

- Mio Hydroelectric Plant was built in 1916 on the lower Au Sable River. William W. Tefft, a Consumers Power civil and hydraulic engineer, invented and patented the so-called "conduit spillway", which channels excessive flow through channels built into the plant. This was the first plant to use it, and it is cheaper than other forms of spillways.
- Oscoda County Courthouse was built in 1888. It was destroyed by a fire on May 5, 2016. Construction of a new building officially began on May 20, 2019, and was completed in February 2020.

== Amish community ==
In 1900, Mio’s first Amish settlers arrived from Geauga County, Ohio. These settlers were considered "Old Order Amish" and followed strict rules. The fairly inexpensive land prices brought in more Amish settlers, and in the first five years, the community grew rapidly. The settlers took advantage of the once wooded land by growing clover, hay, peas, corn, and potatoes, as well as other bumper crops. Eventually, the Old Order Amish began to dwindle in numbers due to a large number joining the Amish-Mennonite congregation, which held more progressive beliefs. In 1954, the Old Order Amish became extinct when the congregation's last bishop passed away. In 1970, a new group of Amish, also from Geauga County, Ohio, settled in Mio, founding the fourth oldest Amish community. The three church district community is home to around 400 individuals. Although many of the Old Order Amish transitioned to following the Mennonite congregation due to their more progressive beliefs, the Amish that are settled in Mio today still follow a strict set of commands. However, Amish commands do vary from community to community.

== Geography ==
According to the United States Census Bureau, the CDP had a total area of 8.98 square miles (23.3 km^{2}), of which 8.37 square miles (21.7 km^{2}) is land and 0.61 square miles (1.6 km^{2}) (6.79%) is water.

The Mio post office, with ZIP Code 48647, also serves the northern portions of Mentor Township and the northeastern part of Big Creek Township, as well as a large area of eastern and southern Elmer Township and smaller portions of western Clinton Township and Comins Township.

=== Geographic features ===
Mio, part of Northern Michigan, is situated in the Au Sable River Valley. It is surrounded by the Huron National Forest and near the Rifle River State Recreation Area. The area is part of the Au Sable State Forest, specifically the Grayling Forest Management Unit (Alcona, Crawford, Oscoda, and northern Iosco counties). Much of the area sits on the Grayling outwash plain. The Oscoda County Park is minutes away.

=== Record high temperature ===
On July 13, 1936, Mio recorded a daily high temperature of 112 °F (44 °C), which is the highest temperature ever recorded in the state of Michigan.

== Education ==
The area school district is Mio-AuSable Schools, which includes all of the CDP.

Mio-AuSable Schools is a Kindergarten through 12th grade school, with all grades contained in one building. Middle school and high school students are enrolled in seven classes each day, and the year routine follows a semester schedule. Mio-AuSable currently offers two Advanced Placement (AP) courses, AP Biology and AP Calculus AB. The school does not offer any Honors courses, but to make up for the lack of advanced classes, students are encouraged to dual-enroll through Kirtland Community College. Sophomores, juniors and seniors can choose to take online classes through the nearby community college, and if the students receive at least a C in a course, they will be granted college credit in that course which may transfer into the university of their choice after high school.

The high school has about approximately 170 students and 17 teachers, some of which double as middle school teachers.

== Demographics ==
Historical population
Census	Pop.	Note	%±
2000	2,016		—
2010	1,826		−9.4%
2020	1,690		−7.4%
U.S. Decennial Census

=== 2020 census ===
As of the 2020 census, Mio had a population of 1,690. The median age was 49.6 years. 21.4% of residents were under the age of 18 and 22.0% of residents were 65 years of age or older. For every 100 females there were 97.7 males, and for every 100 females age 18 and over there were 93.7 males age 18 and over.

0.0% of residents lived in urban areas, while 100.0% lived in rural areas.

There were 771 households in Mio, of which 21.3% had children under the age of 18 living in them. Of all households, 41.0% were married-couple households, 25.6% were households with a male householder and no spouse or partner present, and 26.6% were households with a female householder and no spouse or partner present. About 39.1% of all households were made up of individuals and 19.0% had someone living alone who was 65 years of age or older.

There were 1,132 housing units, of which 31.9% were vacant. The homeowner vacancy rate was 1.3% and the rental vacancy rate was 0.0%.

Racial composition as of the 2020 census
Race	Number	Percent
White	1,581	93.6%
Black or African American	2	0.1%
American Indian and Alaska Native	10	0.6%
Asian	2	0.1%
Native Hawaiian and Other Pacific Islander	0	0.0%
Some other race	8	0.5%
Two or more races	87	5.1%
Hispanic or Latino (of any race)	35	2.1%

=== 2000 census ===
As of the census of 2000, there were 2,016 people, 826 households, and 537 families residing in the CDP. The population density was 270.1 inhabitants per square mile (104.3/km^{2}). There were 1,191 housing units at an average density of 159.6 per square mile (61.6/km^{2}). The racial makeup of the CDP was 96.83% White, 0.15% African American, 0.55% Native American, 0.10% Asian, 0.25% from other races, and 2.13% from two or more races. Hispanic or Latino of any race were 1.44% of the population.

There were 826 households, out of which 30.3% had children under the age of 18 living with them, 49.4% were married couples living together, 11.5% had a female householder with no husband present, and 34.9% were non-families. 28.5% of all households were made up of individuals, and 13.4% had someone living alone who was 65 years of age or older. The average household size was 2.44 and the average family size was 2.99.

In the CDP, the population was spread out, with 26.0% under the age of 18, 8.2% from 18 to 24, 27.8% from 25 to 44, 21.9% from 45 to 64, and 16.1% who were 65 years of age or older. The median age was 38 years. For every 100 females, there were 92.6 males. For every 100 females age 18 and over, there were 87.5 males.

The median income for a household in the CDP was $26,831, and the median income for a family was $31,379. Males had a median income of $29,542 versus $20,927 for females. The per capita income for the community was $13,064. About 13.9% of families and 21.3% of the population were below the poverty line, including 33.3% of those under age 18 and 13.4% of those age 65 or over.

== Local attractions and activities ==
The community is centered in the Huron National Forest along the Au Sable River. Wildlife are nearby, including bear, deer, eagles, Kirtland's warblers, and turkeys. Local attractions and activities include:

- Oscoda County Riverfest
- Amish community with stores and bakeries
- Birding
- Boating, paddling (canoe and kayak)
- Coptic Orthodox St. Mina Retreat Center
- Fishing, particularly trout fishing
- Mio Pond Fishing Tournament (Pike, walleye, and bass)
- Red, White, and Blue Collar Festival
- Geocaching
- Hiking
- Hunting
- Kirtland's Warbler Habitat and Festival: The Kirtland's warbler has its habitat in the area. There is a Kirtland's Warbler Festival, which is sponsored in part by Kirtland Community College.
- Mennonite Relief Expo & Fair
- Michigan Shore to Shore Riding & Hiking Trail passes through Mio. It runs from Empire to Oscoda, and points north and south. It is a 500-mile interconnected system of trails.
- Nordic skiing
- The Michigan AuSable Valley Railroad is a 16 in (406 mm), 1/4-scale ridable miniature railway, located in Fairview, Michigan. The railroad runs through the scenic Huron National Forest and the Comins Creek valley. It is 6.3 miles (10.1 km) away.
- ORV, motorcycle, and groomed snowmobile trails
- Steiner's Museum of pioneer artifacts is in nearby Fairview.
- Our Lady of the Woods Catholic Shrine
- Timberland Quilt Trail

== Local recurring events ==
There are many recurring local events, including:

- First Dam Canoe Race (Michigan Canoe Racing Association)
- Mennonite relief sale
- Michigan Magazine Craft Show
- Mio Mud Bogs & Drags
- Nor-East'r Music & Art Festival
- Outdoor Sportsmen's Expo
- Oscoda County Fair & Forestry Exposition

== Media ==
The following can be accessed in Mio, Michigan:

=== Newspapers ===
- The Oscoda County Herald is a weekly publication available on newsstands every Tuesday and by mail on Wednesday. The paper covers news and sports from all of Oscoda County, as well as other nearby communities. It also serves as the paper of record for all municipalities in Oscoda County, and is the only newspaper recognized by the Michigan Press Association that operates inside of Oscoda County. The Oscoda County Herald is owned by Sunrise Printing & Publishing, which also owns the Ogemaw County Herald and the Arenac County Independent.

=== Radio ===
==== FM ====
Call sign	Frequency	City of License
WJOJ	89.7	Harrisville
WPHN	90.5	Gaylord
WCML	91.7	Alpena
WFDX	92.5	Atlanta
WAVC	93.9	Mio
WKJZ	94.9	Hillman
WCMB-FM	95.7	Oscoda
WUPS	98.5	Harrison
WATZ	99.3	Alpena
WQON	100.3	Grayling
WMJZ	101.5	Gaylord
WKJC	104.7	Tawas City
WHSB	107.7	Alpena

==== AM ====
There are no AM radio stations in range of Mio, Michigan, although WWJ can be heard faintly at night.
