= Michigan Shore-to-Shore Trail =

Trail in USA

Coordinates: 44.59886°N 83.83904°W

- Length: 220 mi (350 km)
- Trailheads: Lake Michigan, Empire, Michigan; Lake Huron, Oscoda, Michigan
- Use: Hiking, Horseback riding
- Difficulty: Varies from location to location
- Sights: Diverse environmental, cultural, and historic features of the northern Lower Peninsula of Northern Michigan, United States.

The Michigan Shore-to-Shore Trail (also known as the Michigan Riding and Hiking Trail) is a 220-mile-long (350 km) trail that runs between Empire on Lake Michigan and Oscoda on Lake Huron across the Lower Peninsula of Michigan. It is open to horseback riders and hikers but not bicycles.

The trail's western end is located within the Sleeping Bear Dunes National Lakeshore. The trail, going from west to east, travels through the Boardman River valley and follows the Au Sable River for about 50 miles (80 km). The trail was developed by trail riders in 1962 and travels through mixed hardwood and conifer forests. Public campgrounds are located throughout the route.

Michigan has many other important and scenic trails. Chief among them is the North Country National Scenic Trail.
