= Fairview, Michigan =

- Unincorporated community
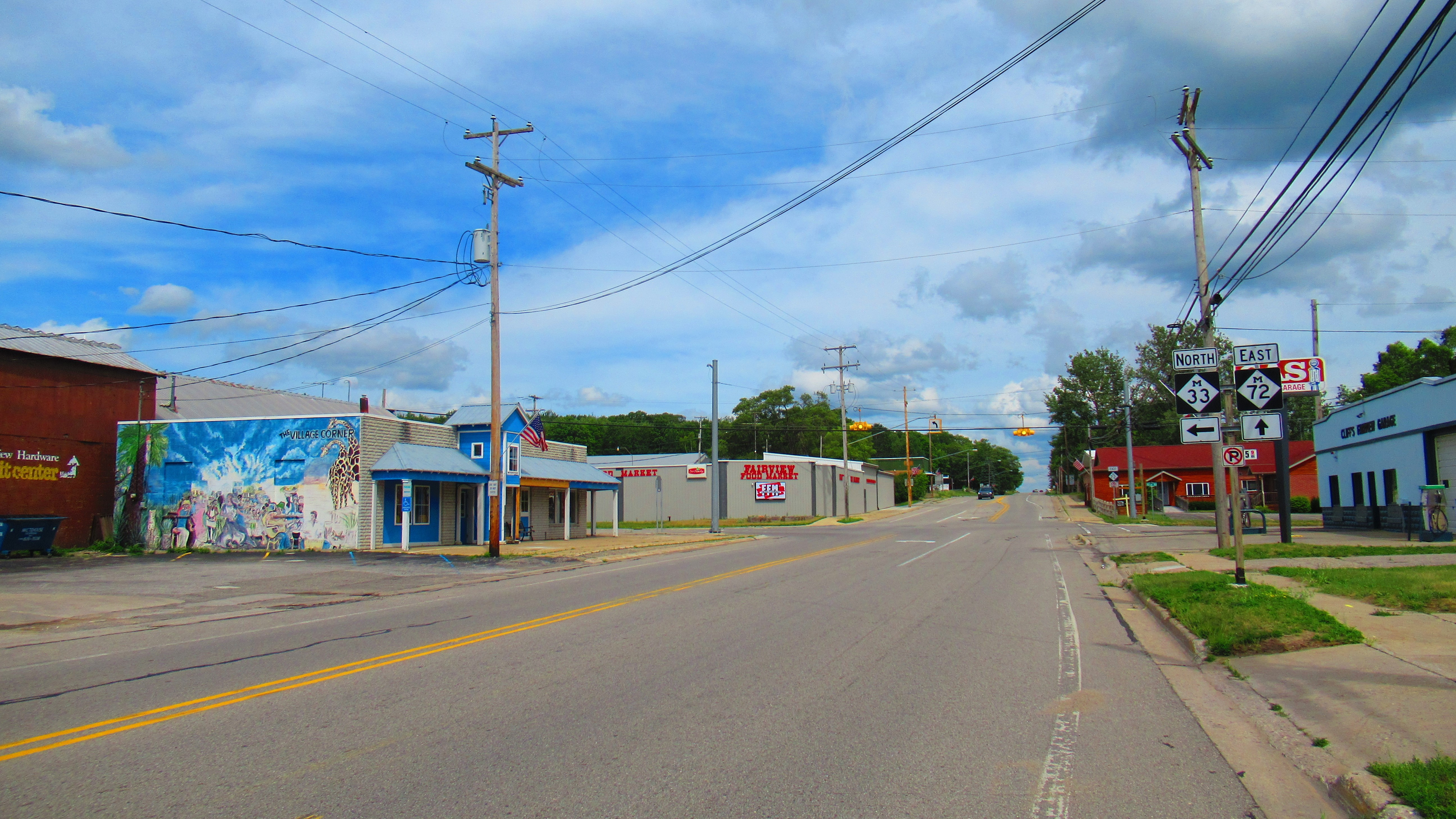
- Intersection of M-33 and M-72

- Location within the state of Michigan Location within the United States
- Coordinates: 44°43′30″N 84°03′04″W
- Country: United States
- State: Michigan
- County: Oscoda
- Township: Comins
- Elevation: 784 ft (239 m)
- Time zone: UTC-5 (Eastern (EST))
  - Summer (DST): UTC-4 (EDT)
- ZIP code(s): 48621
- Area code: 989
- FIPS code: 26-27240
- GNIS feature ID: 1619884

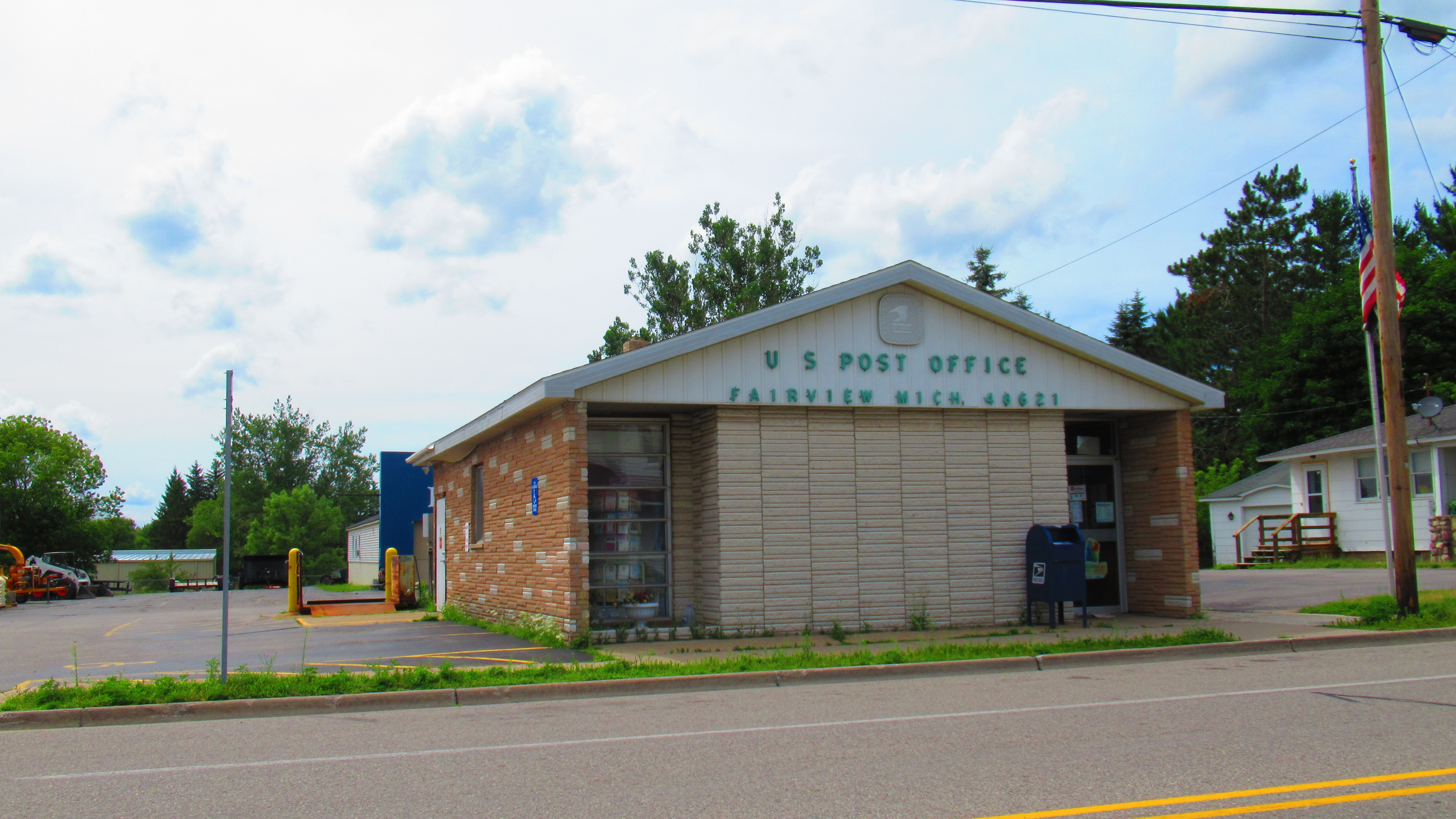
U.S. Post Office in Fairview

Fairview is an unincorporated community in Oscoda County in the U.S. state of Michigan. It is located within Comins Township at the intersection of highways M-33 and M-72 at 44°43′30″N 84°03′04″W.

Fairview is considered the wild turkey capital of Michigan. The Fairview 48621 ZIP Code serves most of Comins Township, as well as small portions of Clinton Township to the north and Mentor Township to the south.

== Geography ==
=== Geographic features ===
- Fairview is situated near the Au Sable River Valley.
- It is surrounded by the Huron National Forest and near the Rifle River State Recreation Area.
- The area is part of the Au Sable State Forest, specifically the
  - Grayling FMU (Alcona, Crawford, Oscoda, and northern Iosco counties).
- The Oscoda County Park is minutes away.
- Fairview is part of Northern Michigan.
- Fairview sits on the "Grayling outwash plain", a unique habitat. Glaciers shaped the area, creating a unique regional ecosystem. A large portion of the area is the so-called Grayling outwash plain, which consists of broad outwash plain including sandy ice-disintegration ridges; jack pine barrens, some white pine-red pine forest, and northern hardwood forest. Large lakes were created by glacial action.

=== Highways ===
- M-33 runs mostly concurrent with M-72 before separating north in the center of the community, where it is known locally as North Abbe Road.
- M-72 runs eastwest through the center of the community and merges briefly with M-33. Locally, it is referred to as East Miller Road.

== Local attractions and activities ==
=== Attractions ===
The community is centered in the Huron National Forest along the Au Sable River. Wildlife are nearby, including bear, deer, eagles, Kirtland's warblers, and turkeys. Local attractions and activities include:

- Mennonite Relief Expo & Fair
- Steiner Museum
- Michigan Shore to Shore Riding & Hiking Trail passes nearby. It runs from Empire to Oscoda, and points north and south. It is a 500-mile interconnected system of trails.

=== Activities ===
- Birding - Kirtland Warbler Habitat and Festival. The Kirtland's warbler has its habitat in the area. There is a Kirtland's Warbler Festival, which is sponsored in part by Kirtland Community College.
- Boating, paddling (canoe and kayak)
- Fishing, particularly trout fishing
- Hiking
- Golf
- Hunting
- Cross-country skiing
- ORV, motorcycle and groomed snowmobile trails, including the renowned Bull Gap.
- Every year, Fairview Area Schools puts on Eagle Festival. This festival is in the second week of October, and is a fundraiser for Fairview School's athletic department. The festival includes a parade, soccer games, a silent auction, car shows, kiddie games and more.
