= Elmer Township, Oscoda County, Michigan =

Elmer Township, Michigan
- Civil township
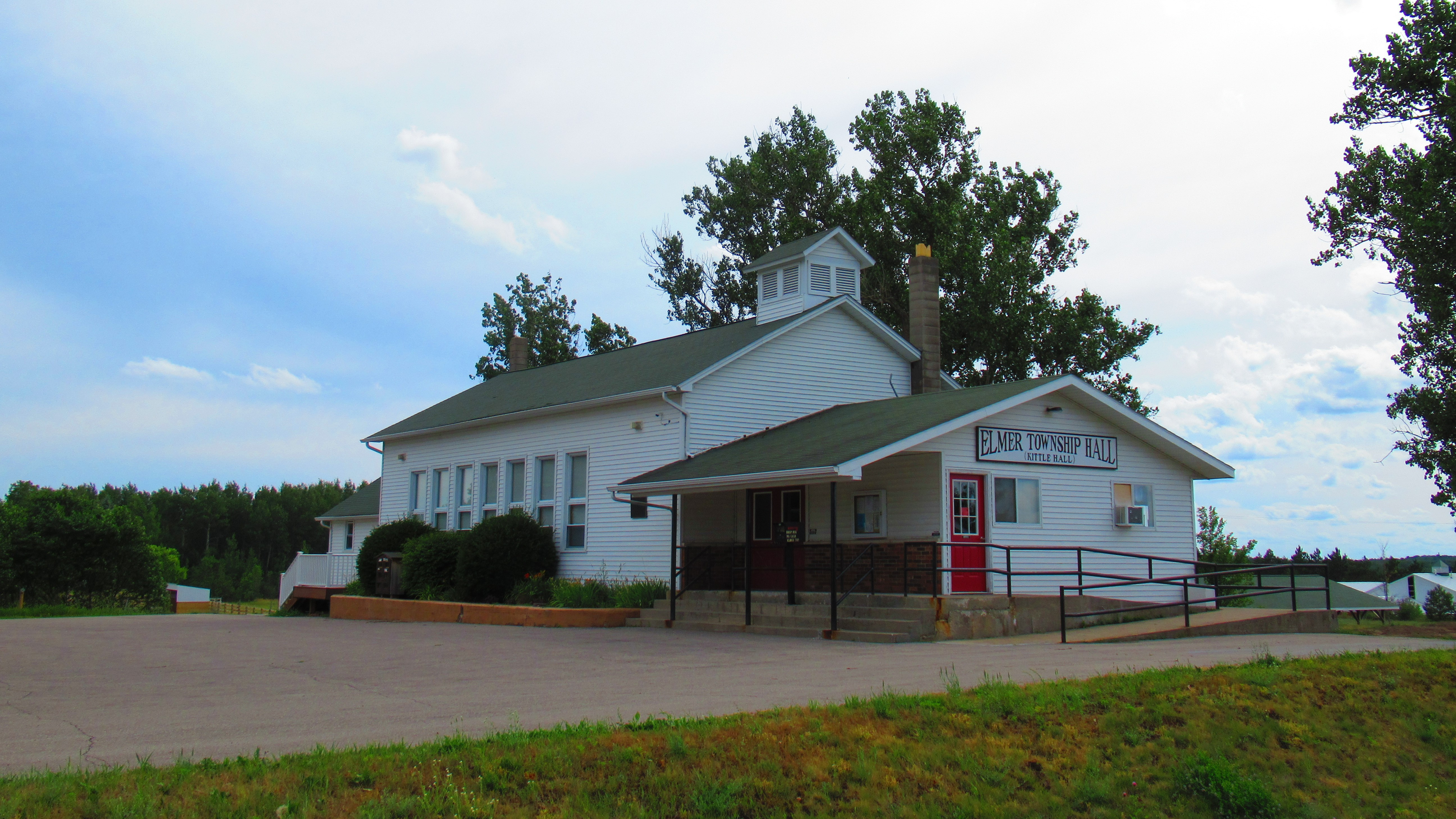
- Elmer Township Hall (Kittle Hall)

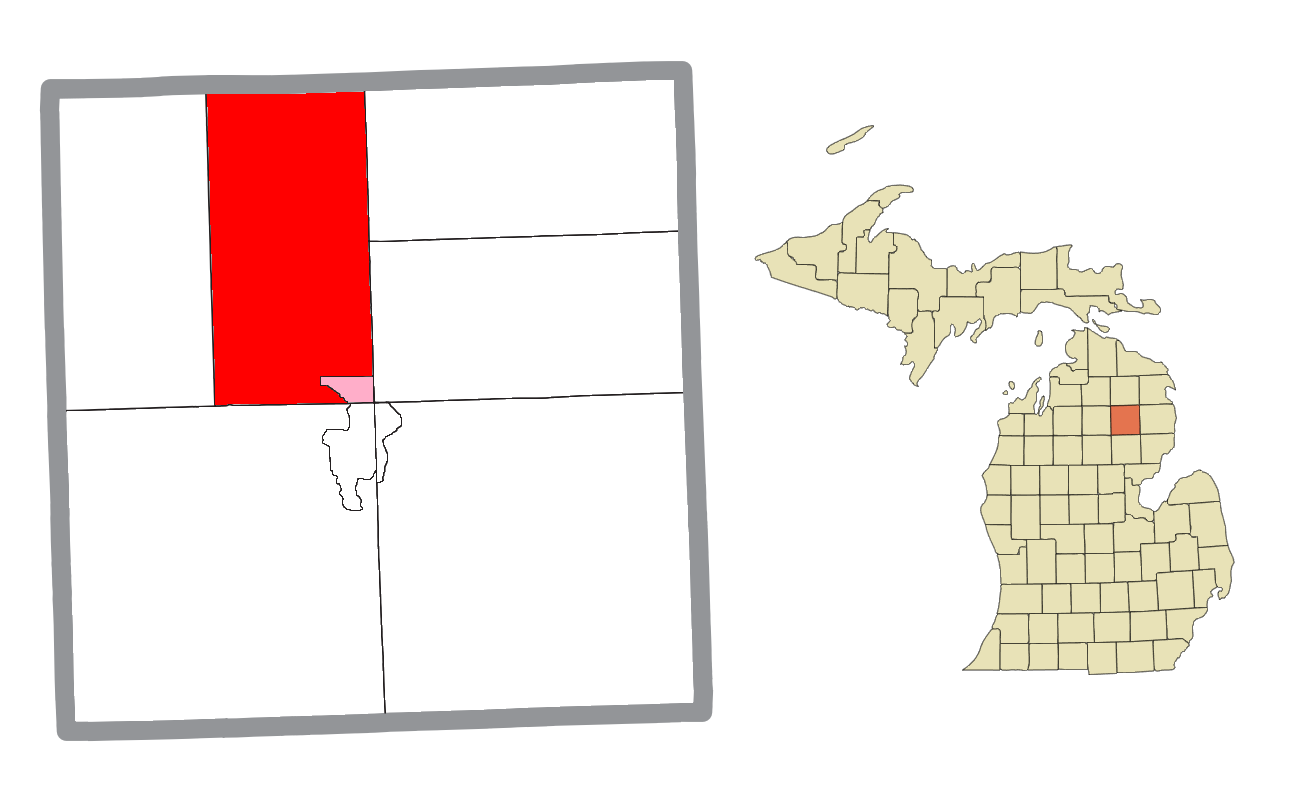
- Location within Oscoda County (red) and an administered portion of the Mio community (pink)

- Location within the state of Michigan Location within the United States
- Coordinates: 44°46′08″N 84°11′38″W
- Country: United States
- State: Michigan
- County: Oscoda
- Established: 1881

Government
  - Supervisor: Martin Galbraith
  - Clerk: Jeanie Smith

Area
  - Total: 71.37 sq mi (184.8 km^{2})
  - Land: 70.95 sq mi (183.8 km^{2})
  - Water: 0.42 sq mi (1.1 km^{2})
- Elevation: 1,280 ft (390 m)

Population (2020)
  - Total: 1,150
  - Density: 16.2/sq mi (6.3/km^{2})
- Time zone: UTC-5 (Eastern (EST))
  - Summer (DST): UTC-4 (EDT)
- ZIP code(s): 48619 (Comins); 48647 (Mio); 49756 (Lewiston)
- Area code: 989
- FIPS code: 26-25500
- GNIS feature ID: 1626231

Elmer Township is a civil township of Oscoda County in the U.S. state of Michigan. The population was 1,150 at the 2020 census.

== Communities ==
- Mio is an unincorporated community and census-designated place occupying the southeast corner of the township.

== Geography ==
According to the United States Census Bureau, the township has a total area of 71.37 square miles (184.85 km^{2}), of which 70.95 square miles (183.76 km^{2}) is land and 0.42 square miles (1.09 km^{2}) (0.59%) is water.

== Transportation ==
- M-33
- M-72
- F-32

== Demographics ==
As of the census of 2000, there were 1,095 people, 388 households, and 294 families residing in the township. The population density was 15.5 inhabitants per square mile (6.0/km^{2}). There were 840 housing units at an average density of 11.9 per square mile (4.6/km^{2}). The racial makeup of the township was 99.27% White, 0.09% African American, 0.18% Native American, and 0.46% from two or more races. Hispanic or Latino of any race were 0.37% of the population.

There were 388 households, out of which 33.0% had children under the age of 18 living with them, 66.8% were married couples living together, 6.2% had a female householder with no husband present, and 24.0% were non-families. 18.3% of all households were made up of individuals, and 8.5% had someone living alone who was 65 years of age or older. The average household size was 2.82 and the average family size was 3.27.

In the township the population was spread out, with 30.2% under the age of 18, 7.3% from 18 to 24, 21.9% from 25 to 44, 27.9% from 45 to 64, and 12.7% who were 65 years of age or older. The median age was 37 years. For every 100 females, there were 100.2 males. For every 100 females age 18 and over, there were 95.4 males.

The median income for a household in the township was $27,500, and the median income for a family was $31,389. Males had a median income of $29,563 versus $19,886 for females. The per capita income for the township was $15,273. About 13.2% of families and 15.2% of the population were below the poverty line, including 13.5% of those under age 18 and 17.6% of those age 65 or over.
