= Curran, Michigan =

- Unincorporated community
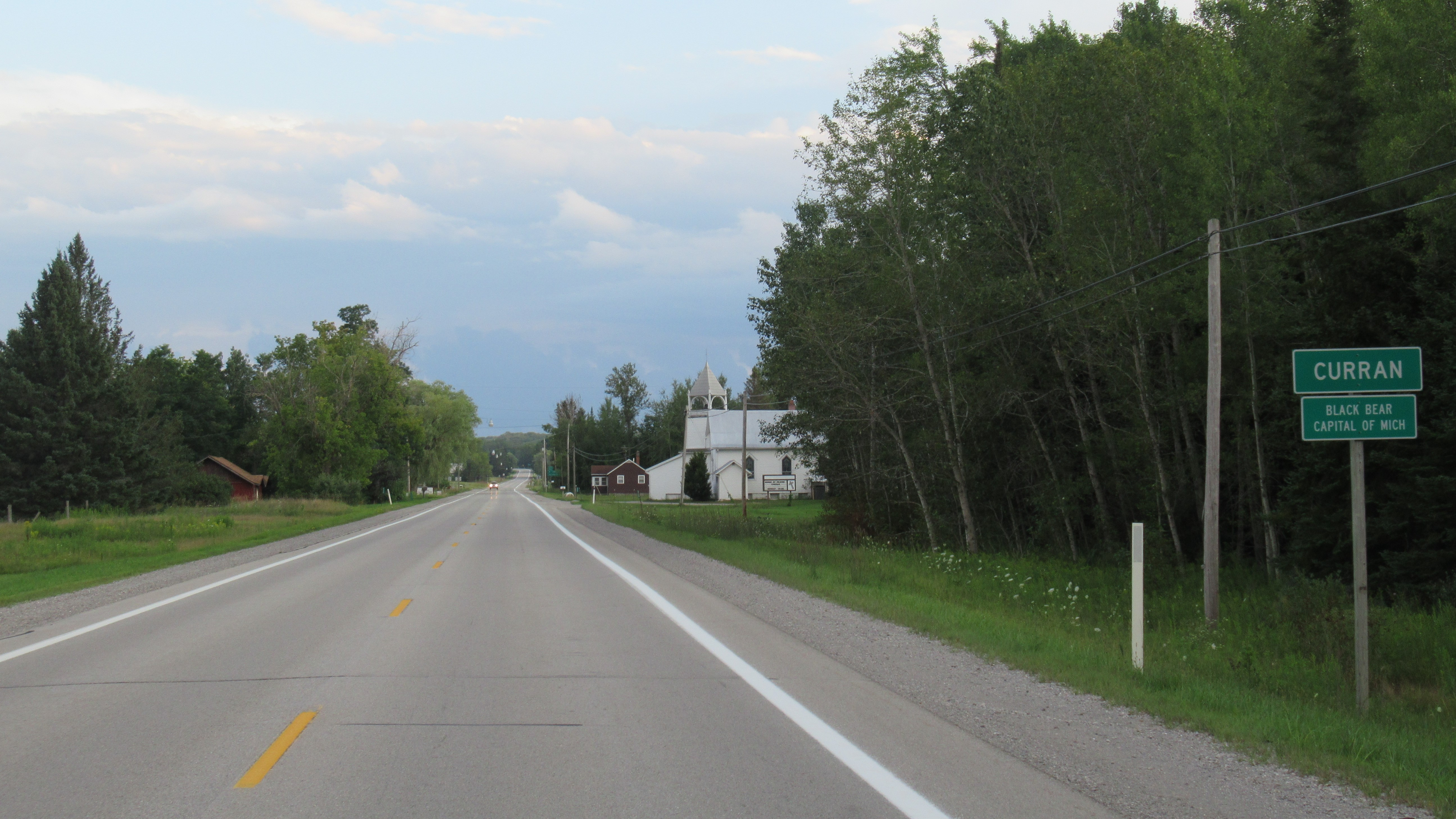
- Looking south along M-65 / M-72
- Motto: "The Black Bear Capital of Michigan"
- Location within the state of Michigan Location within the United States
- Coordinates: 44°42′53″N 83°48′28″W
- Country: United States
- State: Michigan
- County: Alcona
- Township: Mitchell
- Settled: 1875
- Elevation: 922 ft (281 m)
- Time zone: UTC-5 (Eastern (EST))
  - Summer (DST): UTC-4 (EDT)
- ZIP code(s): 48728
- Area code: 989
- GNIS feature ID: 1619642

Curran (/kʌrˈræn/ kurr-RAN) is an unincorporated community in Alcona County in the U.S. state of Michigan. The community is located within Mitchell Township. As an unincorporated community, Curran has no legally defined boundaries or population statistics of its own but does have its own post office with the 48728 ZIP Code.

== Geography ==
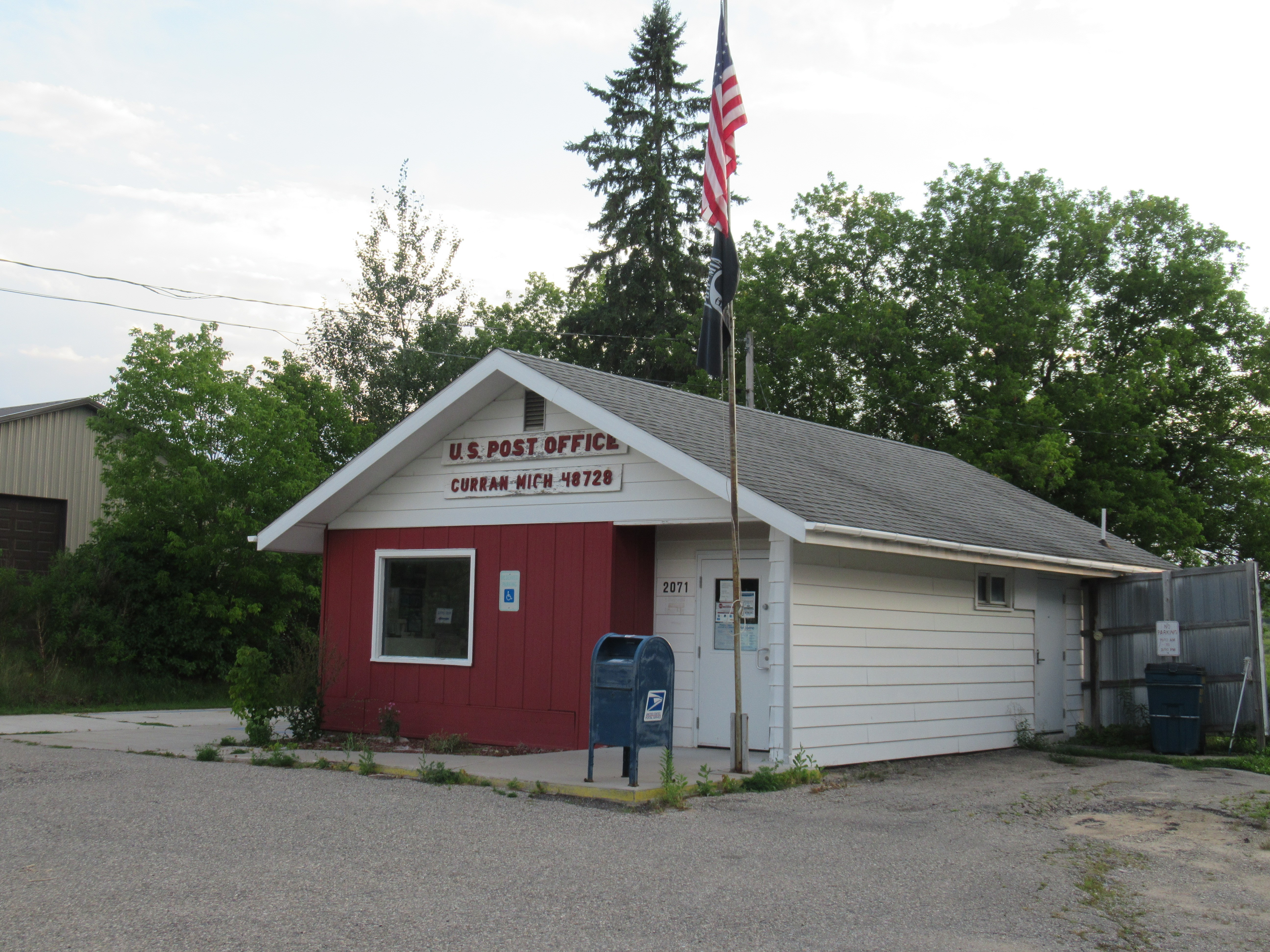
U.S. Post Office in Curran

Curran is centered along the concurrency of M-65 and M-72, which is referred to locally as North Curran Road. The community is in Northern Michigan within Mitchell Township in western Alcona County, which is about 45 miles (72 km) northwest of the community of Oscoda. Curran sits at an elevation of 922 feet (281 m) above sea level.

Little Wolf Creek and Yoder Creek run through the center of the community. Curran is also surrounded by the Huron National Forest.

Curran is served by Fairview Area School District, which is mostly to the west in Oscoda County. The eastern portion of the community may be served by Alcona Community Schools. The township hall is located within Curran at 6849 West Tower Road. The current post office building is located at 2071 North Curran Road.

Curran uses its own post office with the 48728 ZIP Code, which covers most of the sparsely populated areas of western Alcona County. It serves most of Mitchell Township, as well as small portions of Alcona Township, Caledonia Township, and Millen Township to the east. The Curran post office also serves small portions of Comins Township and Clinton Township to the west in Oscoda County, as well as a very small portion of Ossineke Township to the north in Alpena County.

Other nearby communities include Fairview and Mio to the west, McKinley to the southwest, Comins to the northwest, and Barton City and Hubbard Lake to the east.

== History ==
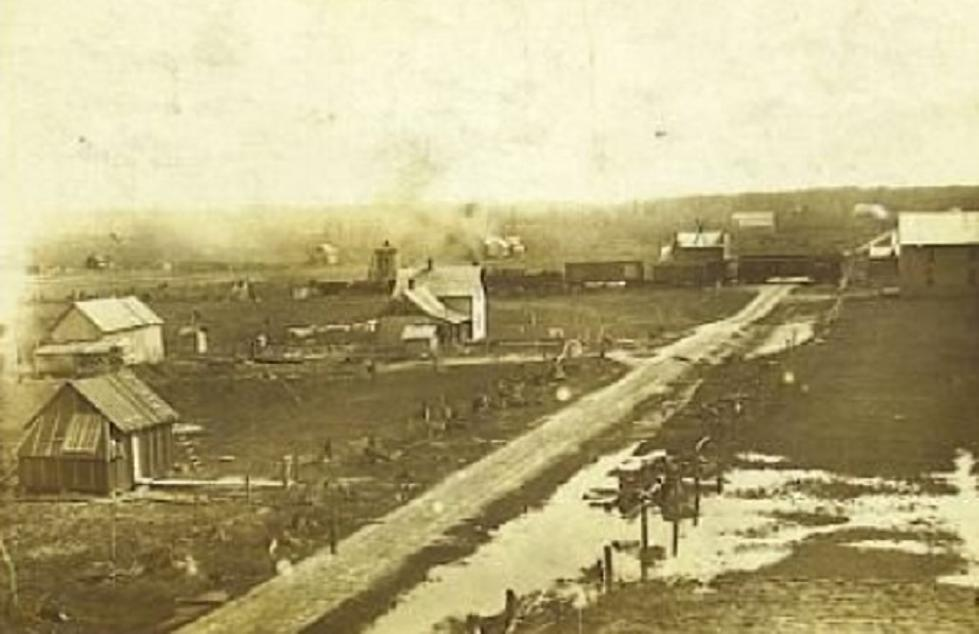
Historic image of Curran from 1910

Curran was first settled by Phillip Curran, who built a lumber camp in the area in 1875. More settlers arrived around 1886. In 1890, the Loud & Sons Lumber Company, managed by George Loud, built a narrow-gauge railway through the area. The community received its first post office on April 28, 1890 with Edward Cunning as the first postmaster. In the same year, it was discontinued on September 30 but quickly reestablished on October 10 with John Fullerton assuming postmaster duties. Mitchell Township, where Curran is located, was also formally organized in 1890.

By 1919, the community had grown to a population of around 150. Curran maintained his logging business until all of the white pines were depleted by the 1920s.

== Black Bear Capital of Michigan ==
Curran is referred to as the "Black Bear Capital of Michigan" due to the abundance of American black bears in the area, and the title is also extended to Mitchell Township as a whole. Governor Jennifer Granholm gave the community this designation after she visited the area in 2005. The title is also used by the unincorporated community of Strongs in Chippewa Township in the state's Upper Peninsula. Curran hosts the annual Black Bear Festival every September. The event was founded in 2005 and features a car show, craft show, music, and vendors. The 2020 Black Bear Festival was canceled due to the COVID-19 pandemic in Michigan, and the event was also canceled in 2021. The Black Bear Festival resumed in 2022 and continues annually.
