= Lost Lake Woods, Michigan =

- Census-designated place (CDP) & unincorporated community
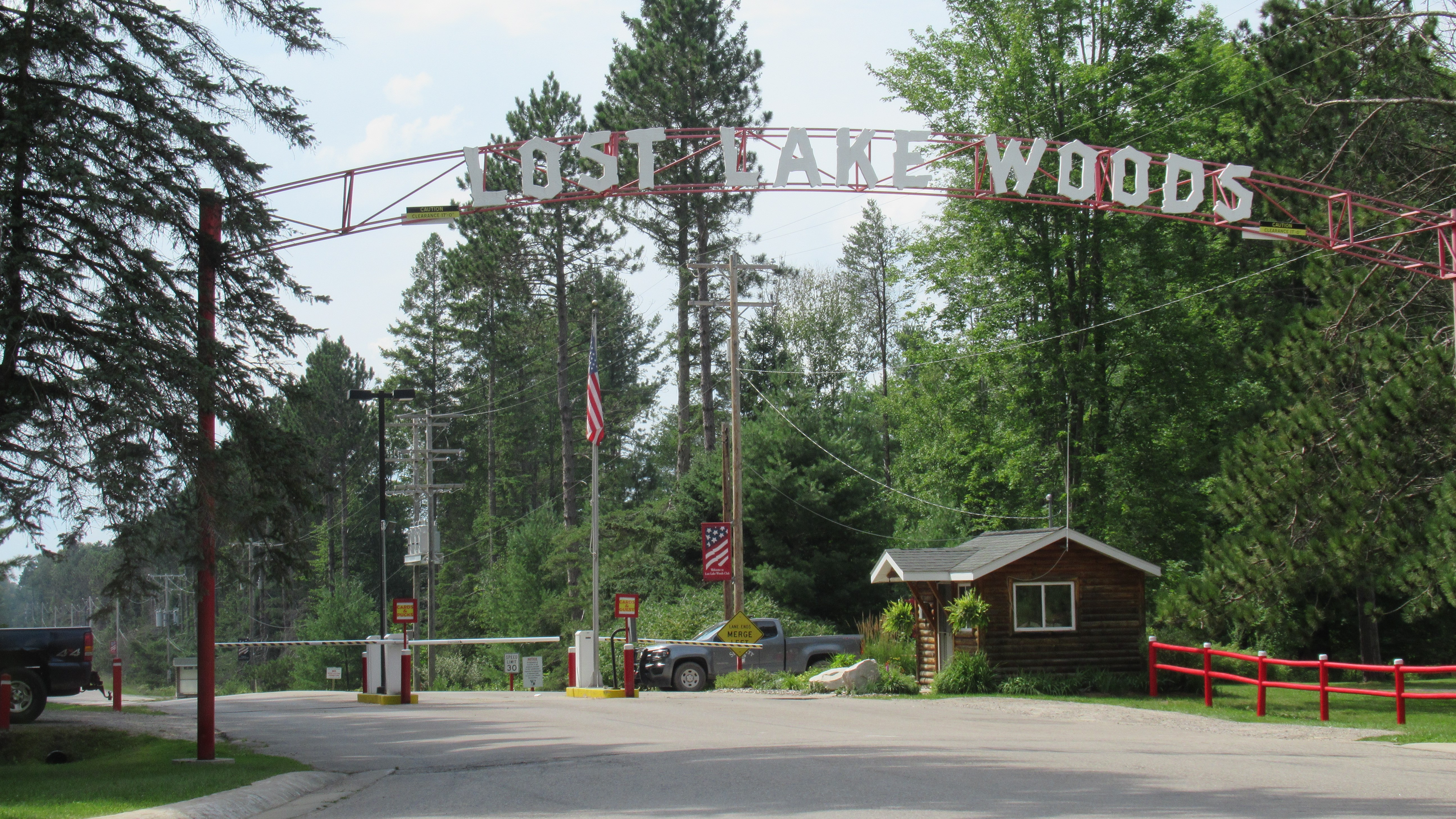
- Gated entrance along F-41

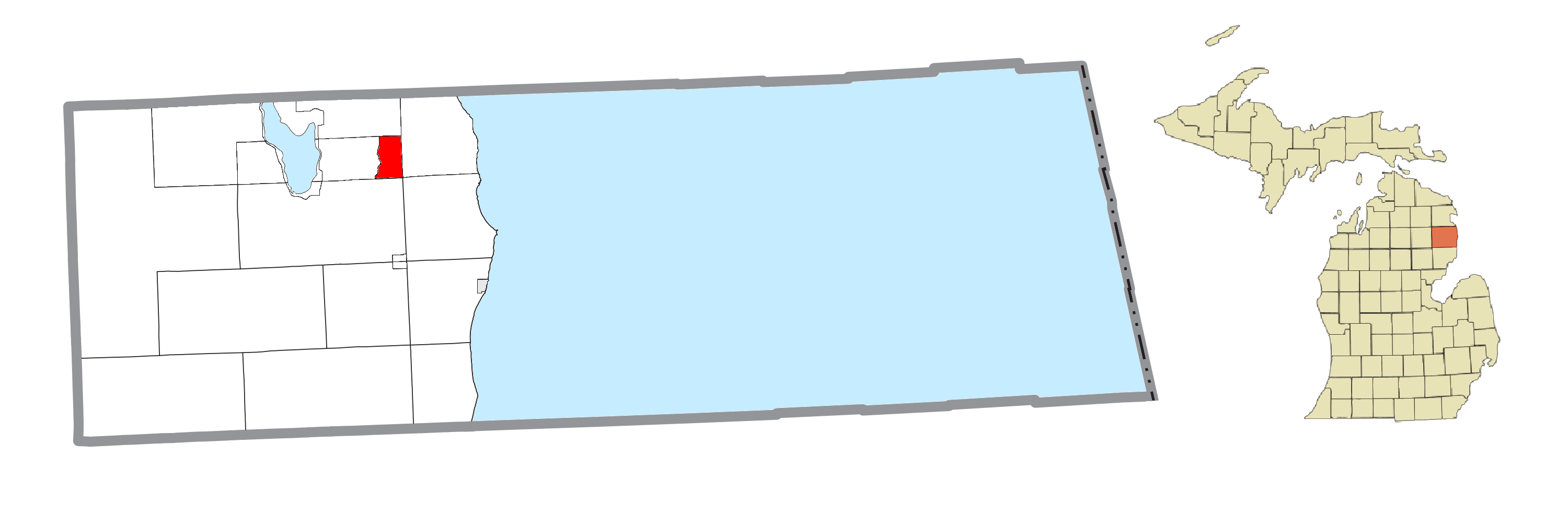
- Location within Alcona County

- Location within the state of Michigan Location within the United States
- Coordinates: 44°46′43″N 83°25′31″W
- Country: United States
- State: Michigan
- County: Alcona
- Township: Alcona
- Established: 1926

Area
  - Total: 5.19 sq mi (13.43 km^{2})
  - Land: 5.05 sq mi (13.07 km^{2})
  - Water: 0.14 sq mi (0.36 km^{2})
- Elevation: 860 ft (262 m)

Population (2020)
  - Total: 367
  - Density: 72.7/sq mi (28.08/km^{2})
- Time zone: UTC-5 (Eastern (EST))
  - Summer (DST): UTC-4 (EDT)
- ZIP code(s): 48742 (Lincoln)
- Area code: 989
- FIPS code: 26-49450
- GNIS feature ID: 1620636

Lost Lake Woods is an unincorporated community and census-designated place (CDP) in Alcona County in the U.S. state of Michigan. The population was 367 at the 2020 census. It is located within Alcona Township.

Lost Lake Woods is a private community with control of over 11,000 acres (45 km^{2}) of woodlands. Entry into the community is strictly for members and guests only. It is located just north of the village of Lincoln.

== Geography ==
According to the U.S. Census Bureau, the CDP has a total area of 5.19 square miles (13.44 km^{2}), of which 5.05 square miles (13.08 km^{2}) is land and 0.14 square miles (0.36 km^{2}) (2.70%) is water.

=== Major highways ===
- F-41 is a county-designated highway that forms the eastern boundary of the CDP.

== Demographics ==
Historical population
Census	Pop.	Note	%±
2000	339		—
2010	312		−8.0%
2020	367		17.6%
U.S. Decennial Census

As of the census of 2020, there were 367 people, 191 households, and 127 families residing in the CDP. The population density was 67.8 inhabitants per square mile (26.2/km^{2}). There were 511 housing units at an average density of 102.2 per square mile (39.5/km^{2}). The racial makeup of the CDP was 99.41% White, 0.29% Native American, and 0.29% from two or more races. Hispanic or Latino of any race were 0.29% of the population.

There were 189 households, out of which 5.3% had children under the age of 18 living with them, 64.6% were married couples living together, 1.6% had a female householder with no husband present, and 32.3% were non-families. 31.2% of all households were made up of individuals, and 23.8% had someone living alone who was 65 years of age or older. The average household size was 1.79 and the average family size was 2.14.

In the CDP, the population was spread out, with 4.7% under the age of 18, 0.6% from 18 to 24, 8.3% from 25 to 44, 31.6% from 45 to 64, and 54.9% who were 65 years of age or older. The median age was 67 years. For every 100 females, there were 101.8 males. For every 100 females age 18 and over, there were 97.0 males.

The median income for a household in the CDP was $32,361, and the median income for a family was $40,714. Males had a median income of $21,875 versus $19,688 for females. The per capita income for the CDP was $22,546. About 1.5% of families and 3.8% of the population were below the poverty line, including none of those under age 18 and 3.6% of those age 65 or over.

== Education ==
Lost Lake Woods is served entirely by Alcona Community Schools.
