= Hawes Township, Michigan =

- Civil township
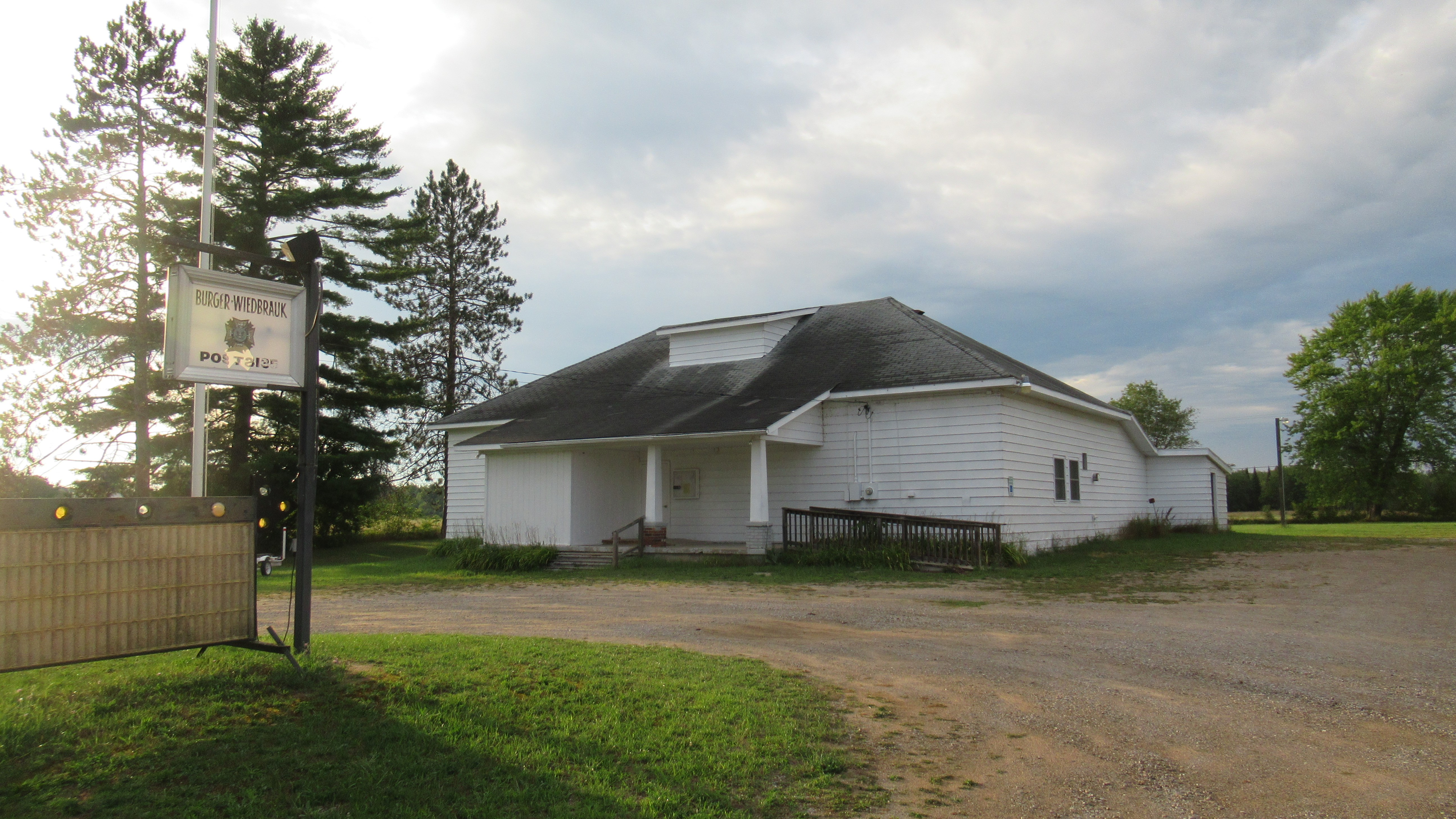
- Hawes Township Hall in Barton City

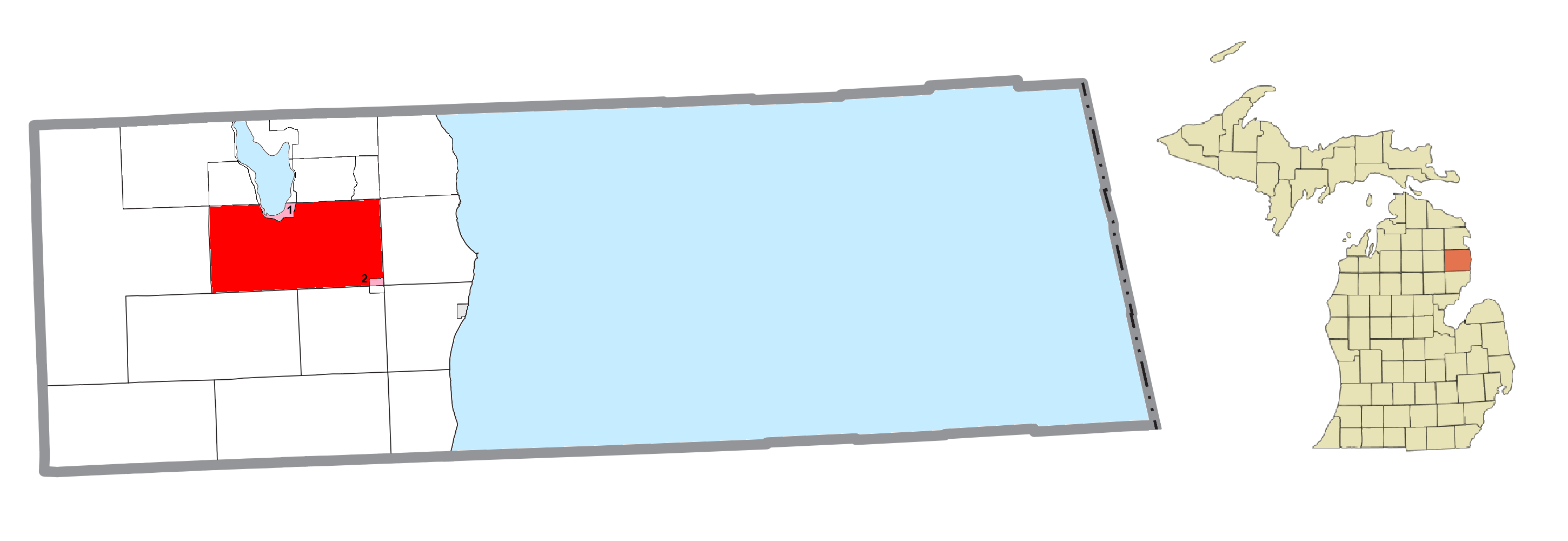
- Location within Alcona County and administered portions of the community of Hubbard Lake (1) and village of Lincoln (2)

- Location within the state of Michigan Location within the United States
- Coordinates: 44°42′49″N 83°30′15″W
- Country: United States
- State: Michigan
- County: Alcona

Government
  - Supervisor: Rodney Cordes
  - Clerk: Janette Richardson Stover

Area
  - Total: 71.44 sq mi (185.0 km^{2})
  - Land: 69.96 sq mi (181.2 km^{2})
  - Water: 1.48 sq mi (3.8 km^{2})
- Elevation: 889 ft (271 m)

Population (2020)
  - Total: 1,076
  - Density: 15.38/sq mi (5.938/km^{2})
- Time zone: UTC-5 (Eastern (EST))
  - Summer (DST): UTC-4 (EDT)
- ZIP code(s): 48705 (Barton City); 48742 (Lincoln); 48762 (Spruce)
- Area code: 989
- FIPS code: 26-37220
- GNIS feature ID: 1626451
- Website: hawestwp.com

Hawes Township is a civil township of Alcona County in the U.S. state of Michigan. The population was 1,076 at the 2020 census.

== Communities ==
- Backus Beach is an unincorporated community located on the southern shores of Hubbard Lake at 44°45′36″N 83°32′46″W. Backus Beach is included in the Hubbard Lake CDP.
- Barton City is an unincorporated community located at 44°41′03″N 83°36′20″W in the southwest portion of the township. Most of the community is within the northern portion of Millen Township to the south.
- Hubbard Lake is an unincorporated community and census-designated place located at 44°45′35″N 83°33′32″W in the northwest portion of the township along Hubbard Lake. The Hubbard Lake CDP also extends into Alcona Township and Caledonia Township.
- Lincoln is a village located in the southeast corner of the township. The village also extends into Gustin Township to the south.

== Geography ==
According to the U.S. Census Bureau, the township has a total area of 71.44 square miles (185.03 km^{2}), of which 69.96 square miles (181.20 km^{2}) is land and 1.48 square miles (3.83 km^{2}) (2.07%) is water.

The southern portion of Hubbard Lake is within Hawes Township.

=== Major highways ===
- F-41 is a county-designated highway that forms the eastern boundary of the township.

== Demographics ==
Historical population
Census	Pop.	Note	%±
1960	624		—
1970	811		30.0%
1980	996		22.8%
1990	1,035		3.9%
2000	1,167		12.8%
2010	1,107		−5.1%
2020	1,076		−2.8%
Source: Census Bureau. Census 1960- 2000, 2010.

As of the census of 2000, there were 1,167 people, 528 households, and 353 families residing in the township. The population density was 16.7 inhabitants per square mile (6.4/km^{2}). There were 1,003 housing units at an average density of 14.3 per square mile (5.5/km^{2}). The racial makeup of the township was 98.71% White, 0.17% African American, 0.69% Native American, and 0.43% from two or more races. Hispanic or Latino of any race were 0.69% of the population.

There were 528 households, out of which 21.4% had children under the age of 18 living with them, 56.3% were married couples living together, 6.8% had a female householder with no husband present, and 33.0% were non-families. 29.5% of all households were made up of individuals, and 15.5% had someone living alone who was 65 years of age or older. The average household size was 2.20 and the average family size was 2.64.

In the township the population was spread out, with 19.6% under the age of 18, 3.5% from 18 to 24, 23.5% from 25 to 44, 32.0% from 45 to 64, and 21.3% who were 65 years of age or older. The median age was 47 years. For every 100 females, there were 95.8 males. For every 100 females age 18 and over, there were 91.8 males.

The median income for a household in the township was $28,938, and the median income for a family was $36,736. Males had a median income of $31,346 versus $21,538 for females. The per capita income for the township was $16,332. About 10.0% of families and 12.2% of the population were below the poverty line, including 17.8% of those under age 18 and 4.6% of those age 65 or over.

== Education ==
Hawes Township is served entirely by Alcona Community Schools.
