= Alcona Township, Michigan =

- Civil township
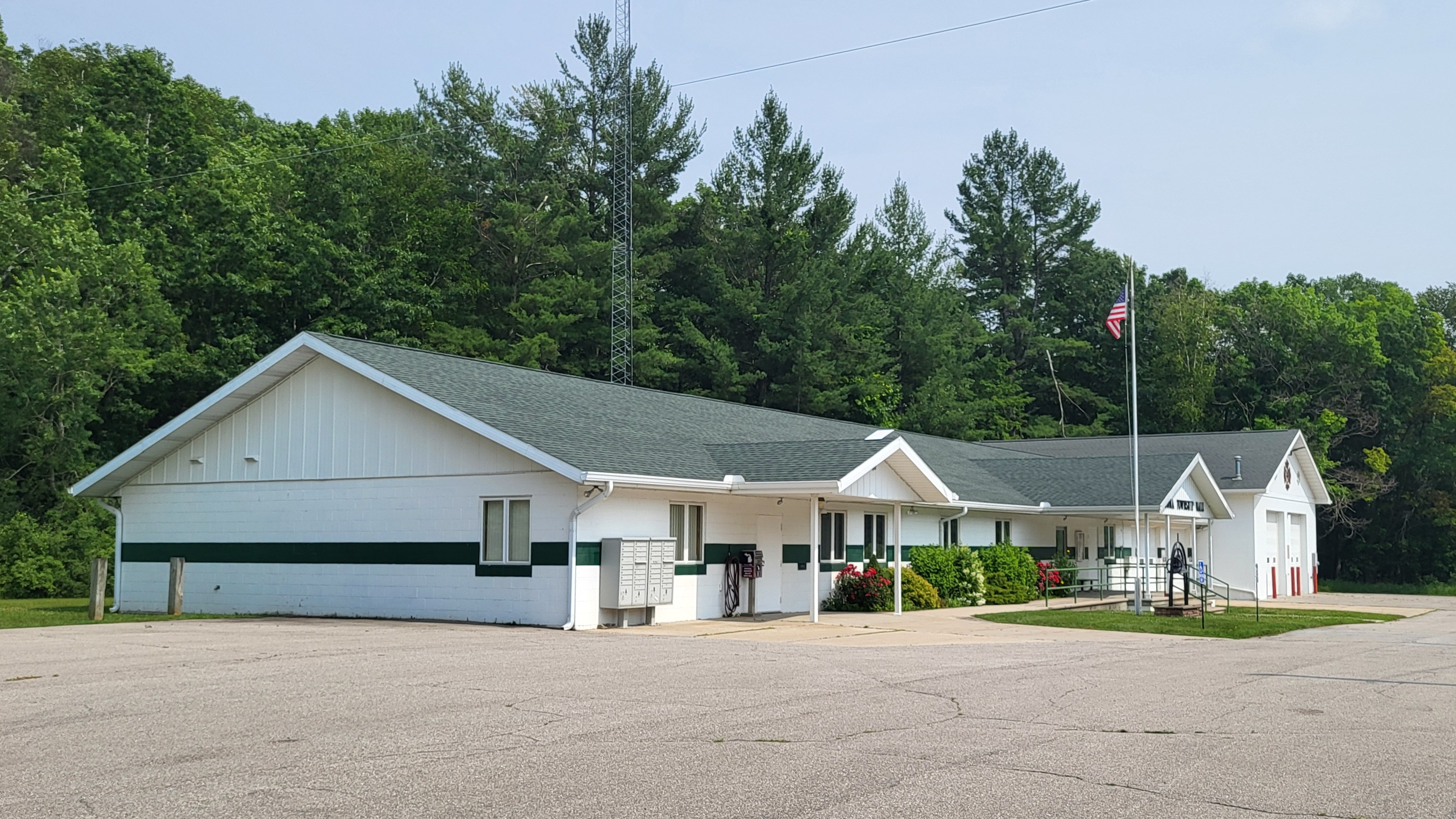
- Alcona Township Hall and Fire Department

- Flag

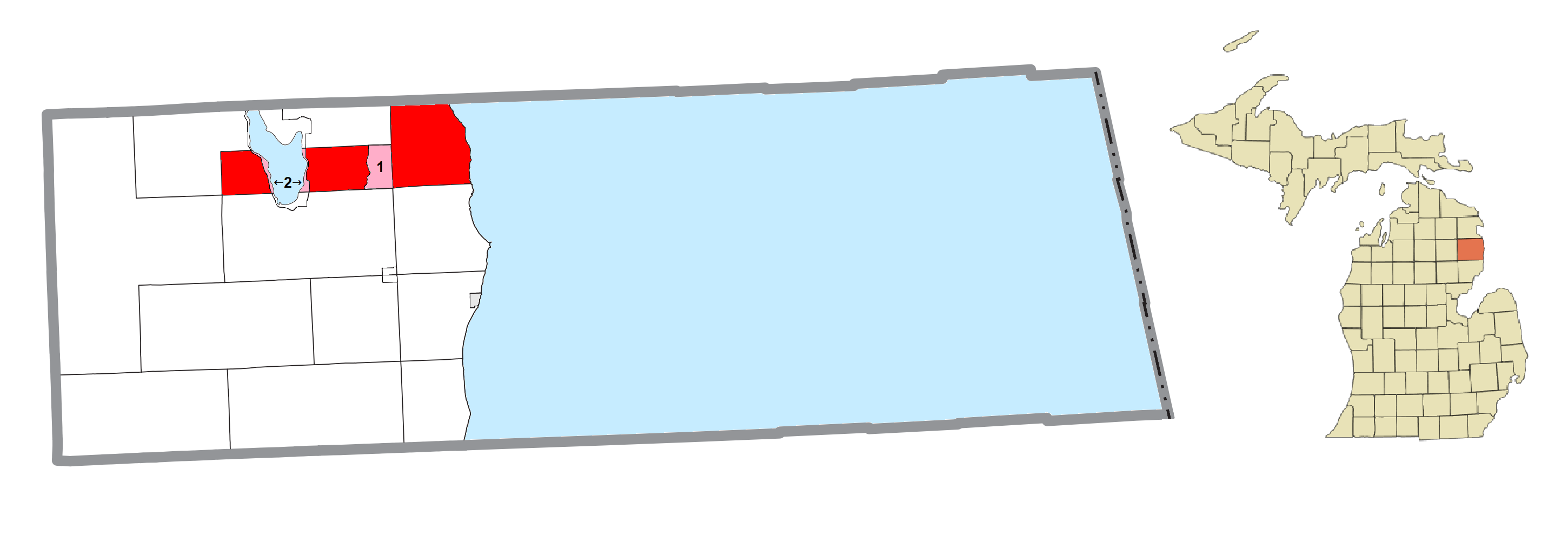
- Location within Alcona County and the administered communities of Lost Lake Woods (1) and portions of Hubbard Lake (2)

- Location within the state of Michigan Location within the United States
- Coordinates: 44°47′04″N 83°26′35″W
- Country: United States
- State: Michigan
- County: Alcona
- Organized: February 2, 1867

Government
  - Supervisor: Marlena MacNeill
  - Clerk: Dawn LaLonde

Area
  - Total: 66.36 sq mi (171.9 km^{2})
  - Land: 57.50 sq mi (148.9 km^{2})
  - Water: 8.86 sq mi (22.9 km^{2})
- Elevation: 797 ft (243 m)

Population (2020)
  - Total: 966
  - Density: 16.8/sq mi (6.49/km^{2})
- Time zone: UTC-5 (Eastern (EST))
  - Summer (DST): UTC-4 (EDT)
- ZIP code(s): 48721 (Black River); 48728 (Curran); 48742 (Lincoln); 48762 (Spruce); 49747 (Hubbard Lake); 49766 (Ossineke)
- Area code: 989
- FIPS code: 26-01040
- GNIS feature ID: 1625815
- Website: Official website

Alcona Township is a civil township of Alcona County in the U.S. state of Michigan. The population was 966 at the 2020 census.

== Communities ==
- Black River is an unincorporated community located along the shores of Lake Huron.
- Hubbard Lake is an unincorporated community and census-designated place that surrounds Hubbard Lake at 44°45′35″N 83°33′32″W. It should not be confused with another nearby community named Hubbard Lake just to the north in Alpena County.
- Larson Beach is an unincorporated community located at 44°48′03″N 83°31′25″W within the CDP of Hubbard Lake.
- Lost Lake Woods is an unincorporated community and census-designated place within the center of the township at 44°46′37″N 83°25′28″W.

== Geography ==
According to the U.S. Census Bureau, the township has a total area of 66.36 square miles (171.87 km^{2}), of which 57.50 square miles (148.92 km^{2}) is land and 8.86 square miles (22.95 km^{2}) (13.35%) is water.

The southern portion of Negwegon State Park is located within the township, and it extends north into Alpena County. Portions of the township are also included in the Huron National Forest. The township has a coastline along Lake Huron and also includes Black River and part of Hubbard Lake

=== Major highways ===
- US 23 runs along the eastern portion of the township near Lake Huron.
- F-41 is a county-designated highway in the township.

== Demographics ==
Historical population
Census	Pop.	Note	%±
1960	381		—
1970	486		27.6%
1980	811		66.9%
1990	906		11.7%
2000	1,089		20.2%
2010	965		−11.4%
2020	966		0.1%
2021 (est.)	970		0.4%
Source: Census Bureau. Census 1960- 2000, 2010.

As of the census of 2000, there were 1,089 people, 524 households, and 361 families residing in the township. The population density was 18.9 people per square mile (7.3 people/km^{2}). There were 1,313 housing units at an average density of 22.8 units per square mile (8.8 units/km^{2}). The racial makeup of the township was 97.89% White, 0.83% Native American, 0.09% Asian, 0.18% from other races, and 1.01% from two or more races. Hispanic or Latino or any race were 0.73% of the population. 20.1% were German, 15.1% English, 10.9% French, 10.8% Polish, 7.3% Irish and 6.9% French Canadian ancestry.

There were 524 households, out of which 14.9% had children under the age of 18 living with their families, 63.2% had married couples living together, 2.7% had a female householder with no husband present, and 31.1% were non-families. 29.4% of all households were made up of individuals, and 18.7% had someone living alone who was 65 years of age or older. The average household size was 2.08 and the average family size was 2.50.

In the township the population spread out, of which 14.4% were under the age of 18, 3.6% between 18 and 24, 16.5% between 25 and 44, 30.9% between 45 and 64, and 34.5% were 65 years of age or older. The median age was 58 years. For every 100 females, there were 105.5 males. For every 100 females aged 18 and over, there were 103.5 males.

The median income for a household in the township was $34,125, and the median income for a family was $39,934. Males had a median income of $33,250 against $21,364 for females. The per capita income for the township was $20,160. About 4.3% of families and 8.7% of the population were below the poverty line, including 17.1% of those under 18 and 4.9% of those aged 65 or over.

== Education ==
Alcona Township is served entirely by Alcona Community Schools.
