= Ossineke =

Ossineke may refer to the following places in Alpena County in the U.S. state of Michigan:

- Ossineke, Michigan, an unincorporated community in Sanborn Township
- Ossineke Township, Michigan
