= M-72 (Michigan highway) =

State highway in Michigan, United States

M-72
- M-72 highlighted in red

Route information
- Maintained by MDOT
- Length: 156.552 mi (251.946 km)
- Existed: c. July 1, 1919–present
- Tourist routes: Lake Michigan Circle Tour

Major junctions
- West end: M-22 at Empire
- US 31 / M-37 at Traverse City; US 131 / M-66 at Kalkaska; BL I-75 / M-93 at Grayling; M-18 near Luzerne; M-33 at Mio; M-65 at Curran
- East end: US 23 at Harrisville

Location
- Country: United States
- State: Michigan
- Counties: Leelanau, Grand Traverse, Kalkaska, Crawford, Oscoda, Alcona

Highway system
- Michigan State Trunkline Highway System; Interstate; US; State; Byways
← M-71	→ M-73
← M-206	M-208	→ M-209

M-72 is a state trunkline highway in the US state of Michigan, running from Lake Huron to Lake Michigan across the northern part of the Lower Peninsula. The highway connects M-22 in Empire with US Highway 23 (US 23) in Harrisville. It is one of only three Michigan state trunklines that cross the Lower Peninsula, shore to shore. In between, M-72 runs across Northern Michigan woodland, agricultural areas of the Leelanau Peninsula near Traverse City, and the Au Sable River watershed. The trunkline also provides access to Camp Grayling, a National Guard training facility near the city of the same name. Traffic levels along the highway vary from approximately 800 vehicles a day on the east end to over 32,000 vehicles near Traverse City.

M-72 was first designated as a state highway by 1919 along a segment of its current route. It was extended southward in the mid-1920s and westward in the 1940s. One section of the modern highway added to M-72 in 1940 previously existed as M-208 in the 1930s east of Grayling. Another section of highway near Empire was disconnected from the rest of M-72 until the gap was eliminated later in the decade. All of M-72 was completely paved by the early 1960s. The highway was rerouted in a few places in the 1950s, and the last new segment shifted in 1973 near Kalkaska.

== Route description ==
M-72 starts its trans-peninsular journey at M-22 in the community of Empire on the shores of Lake Michigan in the Sleeping Bear Dunes National Lakeshore. From there it runs easterly uphill through mixed farmland and forest to cross the base of the Leelanau Peninsula. As the highway approaches the city of Traverse City, the roadway runs downhill and weaves back and forth across the Leelanau – Grand Traverse county line. M-72 merges with M-22 to run concurrently in the section of Traverse City in Leelanau County and immediately cross the county line into Grand Traverse County. The two highways run along Grandview Parkway, a four-lane boulevard on the shore of the West Arm of Grand Traverse Bay. At the intersection of Grandview Parkway and Division Street, M-22 ends. US 31/M-37 run north along Division Street and turn east onto Grandview Parkway to join M-72. These three highways stay merged in a triple concurrency along the length of Grandview Parkway and across the Boardman River along the bay, bypassing downtown. They then follow Front Street until reaching Garfield Avenue east of downtown. At Garfield, M-37 turns north to run up the Old Mission Peninsula which separates the west and east arms of Grand Traverse Bay. US 31/M-72 continues east along the shores of the East Arm of Grand Traverse Bay and northward to a junction in Acme. M-72 turns east to cross rural eastern Grand Traverse County along rolling hills through the communities of Williamsburg and Barker Creek.

The highway crosses into Kalkaska County at Barker Creek and continues eastward to Kalkaska. There, M-72 meets US 131/M-66 (Cedar Street) on the north side of downtown, and M-72 turns south along Cedar Street and forms another triple concurrency through downtown. South of town, the highway crosses the Boardman River again, and M-72 turns east again headed toward the city of Grayling. M-66 follows M-72 to cross a set of railroad tracks that belong to the Great Lakes Central Railroad before leaving to follow its path to Lake City. M-72 crosses the Manistee River at the Kalkaska–Crawford county line and passes the northern shore of Lake Margrethe west of town in the Camp Grayling military reservation. North of the camp gate, M-72 joins M-93 into downtown Grayling. Together they meet James Street, which carries Business Loop I-75 (BL I-75). M-93 turns north to follow BL I-75 out of town, and M-72 turns south to follow it through downtown. At South Down River Road, M-72 turns east again to leave Grayling, crossing I-75 in the process. There is no direct access to I-75 from M-72. Instead traffic is directed to follow BL I-75 in either direction to get to the freeway.

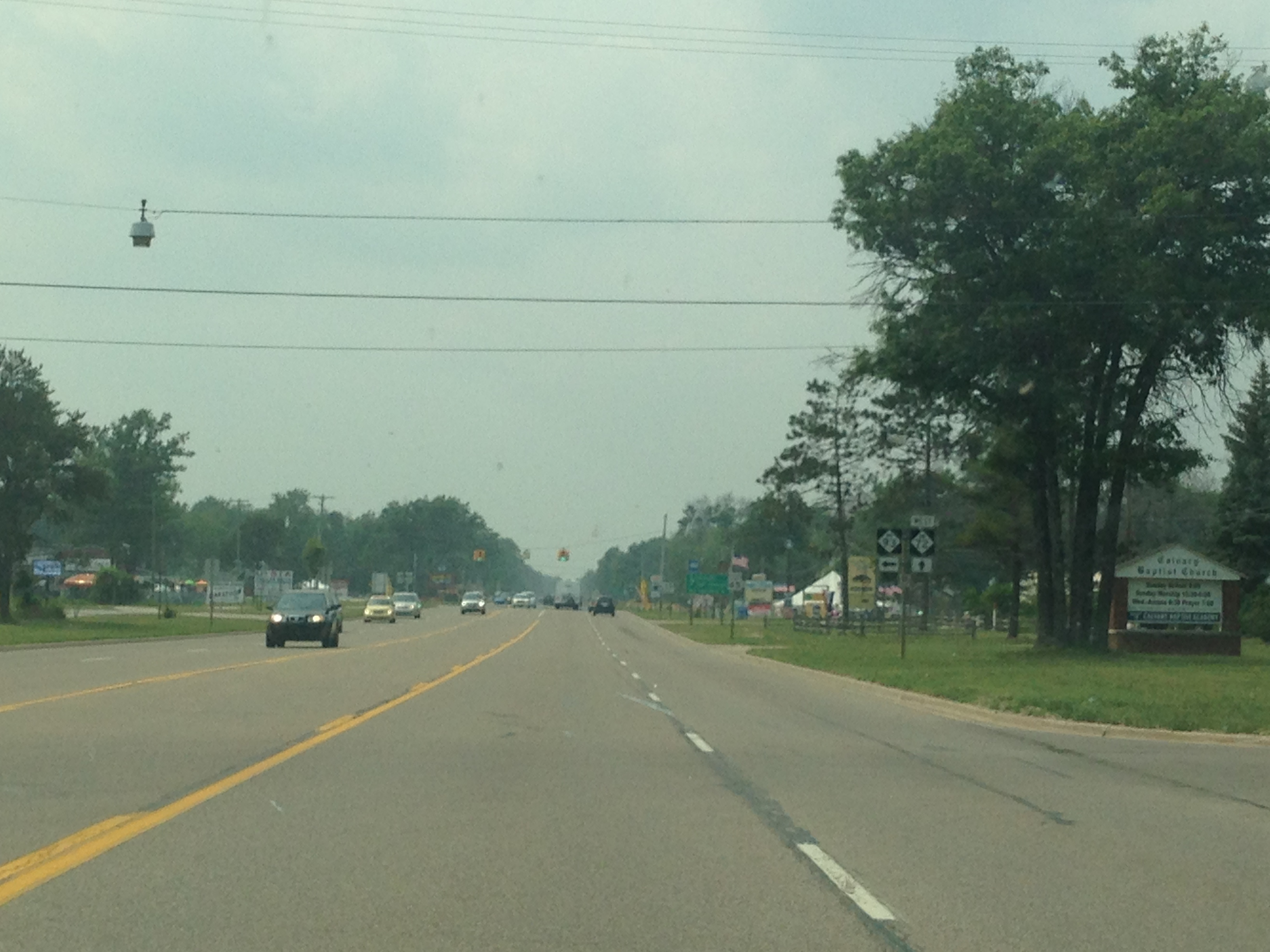
Junction of M-72 and M-93 west of Grayling, looking westbound

In eastern Crawford County, M-72 runs through the Au Sable State Forest and crosses the South Branch of the Au Sable River on Smith Bridge. East of the river crossing, the trunkline intersects the northern terminus of M-18 before crossing into Oscoda County. M-72 continues east through Luzerne to Mio. M-72 merges with M-33 and turns north to cross the Au Sable River a second time in Mio. The highways pick up a concurrency with F-32 north of the river. The three roadways run together until F-32 turns west while M-33/M-72 continues east to Fairview. Fairview marks the northern and eastern end of the concurrency as M-33 turns north towards Atlanta, and M-72 continues easterly into Alcona County. North of Curran, M-72 merges southward with M-65 for approximately 7 miles (11 km) before heading due east through the Barton City and Lincoln areas to Harrisville. M-72 ends at an intersection with US 23 in Harrisville, on the shores of Lake Huron.

M-72 is maintained by the Michigan Department of Transportation (MDOT) like all other parts of the state trunkline highway system. As a part of its maintenance duties, the department tracks the traffic volumes along its roads using a metric called average annual daily traffic (AADT). This figure is a calculation of the traffic level along a segment of roadway for any average day of the year. In 2009, the MDOT surveys found that the highest traffic levels along M-72 were the 33,720 vehicles per day in Traverse City. The lowest AADT was 807 vehicles near Hubbard Lake Road in Alcona County near Lincoln. Commercial traffic varied between the 555 trucks a day in Grayling and the 72 trucks daily west of Harrisville. M-72 has been listed on the National Highway System (NHS) between the intersection of Division Street and Grandview Parkway in Traverse City and the southern junction with BL I-75 in Grayling. The NHS is a network of roads important to the country's defense, mobility and economy. In addition to the NHS listing, M-72 has been included on the Lake Michigan Circle Tour along its segments concurrent with M-22 and US 31 in the Traverse City area.

== History ==
M-72 was first designated by July 1, 1919, and it ran from the middle of Alcona County near Barton City east to Harrisville and then south along Lake Huron shore to Greenbush. Around 1927, the route was extended south to Oscoda and west through Luzerne to just east of Roscommon. The section of M-72 along the shoreline between Oscoda and Harrisville became part of US 23. in 1936. M-72 was extended westward on an earthen highway and then over the former M-208 to Grayling in 1940. From there M-72 was extended further to just south of Kalkaska along a section of highway previously designated M-76. A seven-mile (11 km) long discontinuous segment of highway some 45 miles (72 km) west of Kalkaska near Empire was also redesignated as part of M-72. The section of highway south to Roscommon became M-144. By 1945, the western segment was extended east into Traverse City. The two segments were joined when M-72 was routed along US 31 through Traverse City to Acme by early 1948. From there, M-72 was routed along existing roads through Williamsburg to US 131/M-66 north of Kalkaska where it followed the latter highways through downtown to bridge the gap. With this addition to the routing, the road extended "shore to shore" from Lake Huron to Lake Michigan.

The Michigan State Highway Department rerouted M-33/M-72 near Fairview in late 1951 or early 1952, turning the former route back to local control. In the middle of 1953, the section of M-65/M-72 in Alcona County was straightened and paved. All but the western three miles (4.8 km) of the earthen highway section opened in 1940 were paved in 1957. By the middle of 1961, the highway would be paved in its entirety. A new section of highway was opened in 1973, rerouting M-66 and M-72 due west from their junction to US 131, bypassing a former routing north into Kalkaska.

In 2008, M-72 within Alcona County was named the "Hazen Shirley 'Kiki' Cuyler Memorial Highway" in honor of the Michigan native and Hall of Fame baseball player.

=== M-208 ===
M-208
- Location: Crawford County
- Length: 13.3 mi (21.4 km)
- Existed: 1936–1939

M-208 was a state trunkline highway in that served as a spur route from US 27 (current BL I-75) to the "Wakeley Bridge" in Crawford County in the 1930s. The highway was designated by 1936, and it was removed from the highway system in 1939. By the end of 1940, the roadway was redesignated as a part of the state highway system when M-72 was extended to the bridge from the east and then over the former M-208 to Grayling. The roadway has remained a state highway since.

== Major intersections ==
County	Location	mi	km	Destinations	Notes
Leelanau	Empire	0.000	0.000	M-22 / LMCT (Leelanau Highway) – Leland, Frankfort	
Leelanau–Grand Traverse county line	Traverse City	22.395	36.041	M-22 north / LMCT north – Suttons Bay, Northport	Northern end of M-22/LMCT concurrency
Grand Traverse	Traverse City	22.979	36.981	US 31 south / M-37 south (Division Street) – Baldwin, Manistee M-22 north – Suttons Bay	Northern terminus of M-22; western end of US 31/M-37 concurrency
Grand Traverse	Traverse City	24.964	40.176	M-37 north (Garfield Avenue) – Old Mission	Eastern end of M-37 concurrency
Grand Traverse	Acme	30.979	49.856	US 31 north / LMCT north – Charlevoix, Petoskey	Eastern end of US 31/LMCT concurrency
Kalkaska	Kalkaska	48.080	77.377	US 131 north / M-66 north – Mancelona, Petoskey	Northern end of US 131/M-66 concurrency
Kalkaska	Kalkaska Township	50.084	80.602	US 131 south – Cadillac	Southern end of US 131 concurrency
Kalkaska	Kalkaska Township	50.865	81.859	M-66 south – Lake City	Eastern end of M-66 concurrency
Crawford	Grayling Township	73.052	117.566	M-93 south – Camp Grayling	Western end of M-93 concurrency
Crawford	Grayling	74.439	119.798	BL I-75 north / M-93 north to I-75 north	Eastern end of M-93 concurrency; northern end of BL I-75 concurrency; M-93 turns north along BL I-75
Crawford	Grayling	75.149	120.941	BL I-75 south to I-75 south	Southern end of BL I-75 concurrency
Crawford	South Branch Township	90.737	146.027	M-18 south – Roscommon; F-97	Northern terminus of M-18
Oscoda	Mio	106.213	170.933	M-33 south – Alger	Southern end of M-33 concurrency
Oscoda	Mio	106.974	172.158	F-32 east (McKinley Road) – McKinley	Southern end of F-32 concurrency
Oscoda	Comins Township	111.385	179.257	F-32 west – Lewiston	Northern end of F-32 concurrency
Oscoda	Fairview	114.970	185.026	M-33 north – Atlanta	Eastern end of M-33 concurrency
Alcona	Curran	127.286	204.847	M-65 north – Alpena	Northern end of M-65 concurrency
Alcona	Curran	129.074	207.724	F-32 west (Aspen Alley Road) – McKinley	Eastern terminus of F-32
Alcona	Millen Township	134.293	216.124	M-65 south – Glennie	Southern end of M-65 concurrency
Alcona	Gustin Township	151.245	243.405	F-41 – Lincoln, Mikado	
Alcona	Harrisville	156.552	251.946	US 23 / LHCT – Alpena, Tawas City	Roadway continues as Main Street
1.000 mi = 1.609 km; 1.000 km = 0.621 mi: Concurrency terminus
