= Killmaster =

Killmaster may refer to:

- Nick Carter-Killmaster, a series of spy adventures published from 1964 until the late 1990s
- Killmaster, Michigan, an unincorporated community in Alcona County
