= Gustin Township, Michigan =

- Civil township
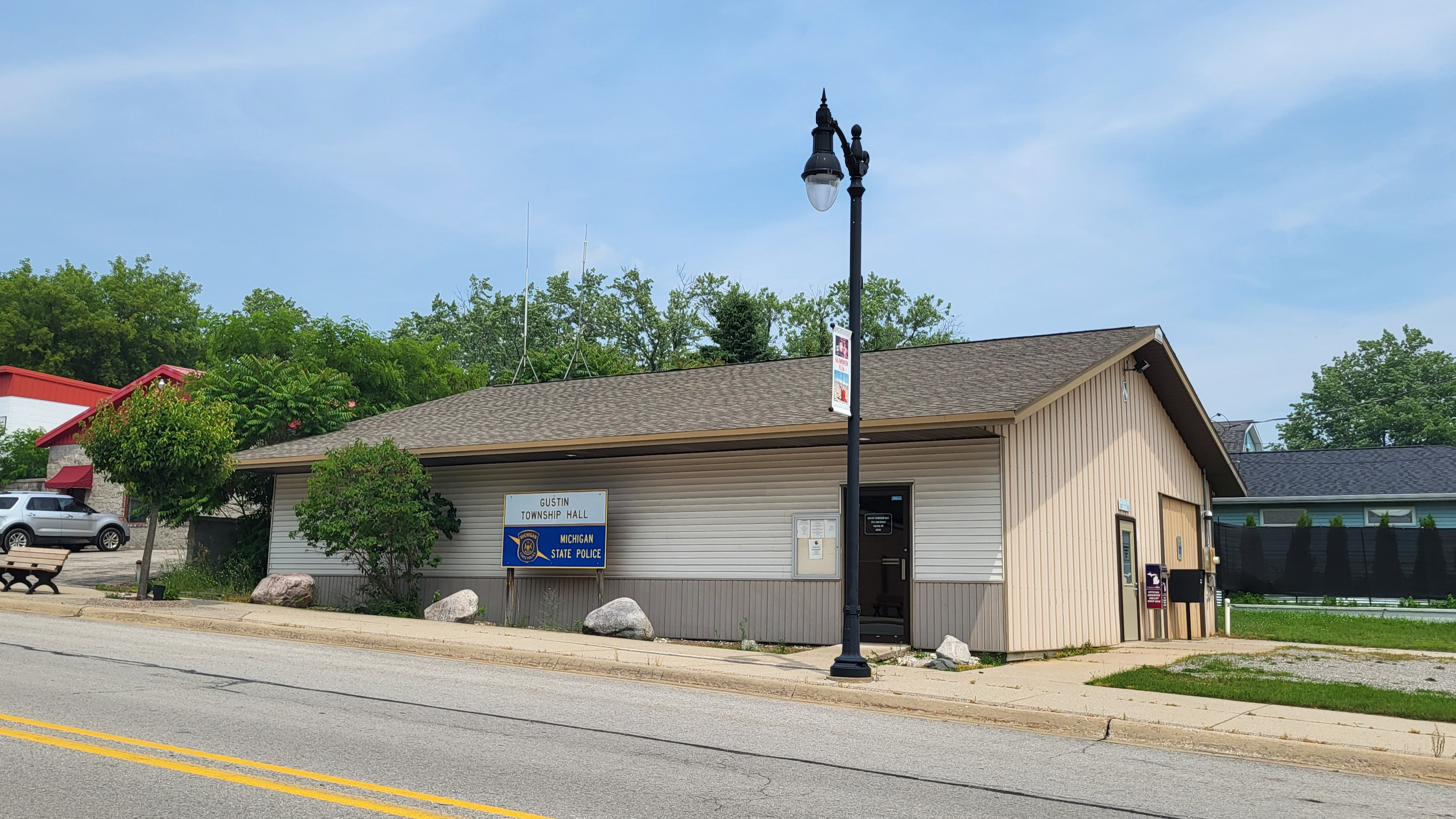
- Gustin Township Hall in Lincoln
- Motto: "Your home away from home."
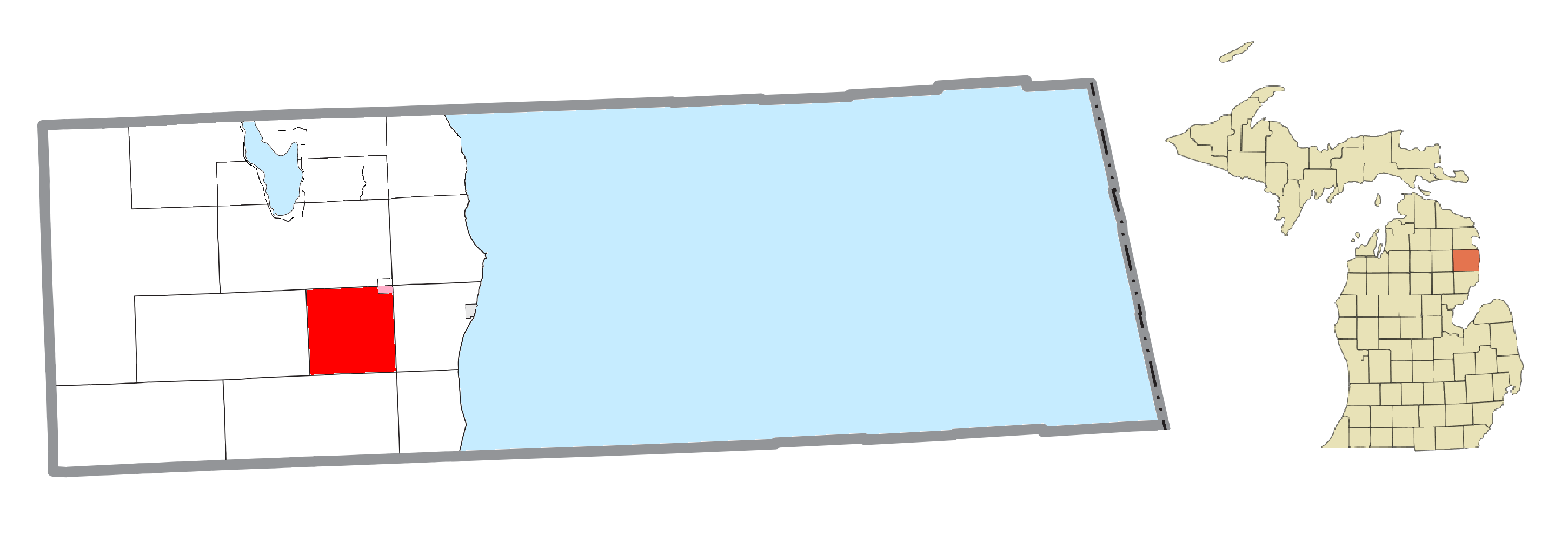
- Location within Alcona County (red) and an administered portion of the village of Lincoln (pink)

- Location within the state of Michigan Location within the United States
- Coordinates: 44°38′33″N 83°26′56″W
- Country: United States
- State: Michigan
- County: Alcona

Government
  - Supervisor: Muriel Goddard
  - Clerk: Renee LaVergne

Area
  - Total: 35.84 sq mi (92.8 km^{2})
  - Land: 35.69 sq mi (92.4 km^{2})
  - Water: 0.15 sq mi (0.39 km^{2})
- Elevation: 720 ft (220 m)

Population (2020)
  - Total: 773
  - Density: 21.7/sq mi (8.36/km^{2})
- Time zone: UTC-5 (Eastern (EST))
  - Summer (DST): UTC-4 (EDT)
- ZIP code(s): 48705 (Barton City); 48740 (Harrisville); 48742 (Lincoln); 48745 (Mikado)
- Area code: 989
- FIPS code: 26-35740
- GNIS feature ID: 1626416
- Website: Official website

Gustin Township is a civil township of Alcona County in the U.S. state of Michigan. The population was 773 at the 2020 census.

== Communities ==
- Gustin is an unincorporated community in the eastern portion of the township at 44°37′38″N 83°24′52″W. Gustin was named after the township and began as a station along the Detroit and Mackinac Railway in 1886. A post office operated from June 6, 1891 until October 15, 1910.
- Lincoln is a village located in the northeast corner of the township, and portions of the village extend north into Hawes Township.
- Killmaster is an unincorporated community in the center of the township at 44°37′54″N 83°27′05″W. Originally part of Harrisville Township, it was named for lumberman John Killmaster, who served as the first postmaster of the Killmaster post office that operated from December 15, 1885 until February 28, 1911.

== Geography ==
According to the U.S. Census Bureau, the township has a total area of 35.84 square miles (92.83 km^{2}), of which 35.69 square miles (92.44 km^{2}) is land and 0.15 square miles (0.39 km^{2}) (0.42%) is water.

=== Major highways ===
- M-72 runs east–west through the center of the township.
- F-41 is a county-designated highway that runs north–south along the eastern portion of the township.

== Demographics ==
Historical population
Census	Pop.	Note	%±
1960	696		—
1970	613		−11.9%
1980	796		29.9%
1990	823		3.4%
2000	832		1.1%
2010	795		−4.4%
2020	773		−2.8%
Source: Census Bureau. Census 1960- 2000, 2010.

As of the census of 2000, there were 832 people, 358 households, and 239 families residing in the township. The population density was 23.3 inhabitants per square mile (9.0/km^{2}). There were 483 housing units at an average density of 13.5 per square mile (5.2/km^{2}). The racial makeup of the township was 98.44% White, 0.60% Native American, and 0.96% from two or more races. Hispanic or Latino of any race were 0.24% of the population.

There were 358 households, out of which 24.9% had children under the age of 18 living with them, 56.1% were married couples living together, 8.9% had a female householder with no husband present, and 33.0% were non-families. 27.7% of all households were made up of individuals, and 13.7% had someone living alone who was 65 years of age or older. The average household size was 2.29 and the average family size was 2.81.

In the township the population was spread out, with 20.6% under the age of 18, 5.8% from 18 to 24, 24.8% from 25 to 44, 29.1% from 45 to 64, and 19.8% who were 65 years of age or older. The median age was 44 years. For every 100 females, there were 95.3 males. For every 100 females age 18 and over, there were 85.2 males.

The median income for a household in the township was $27,350, and the median income for a family was $31,806. Males had a median income of $30,000 versus $17,083 for females. The per capita income for the township was $19,848. About 11.8% of families and 15.0% of the population were below the poverty line, including 20.9% of those under age 18 and 21.5% of those age 65 or over.

== Education ==
Gustin Township is served by two public school districts. The majority of the township is served by Alcona Community Schools, while a very small southern portion of the township is served by Oscoda Area Schools to the south in Iosco County.
