= Hubbard Lake =

Lake in the state of Michigan, United States

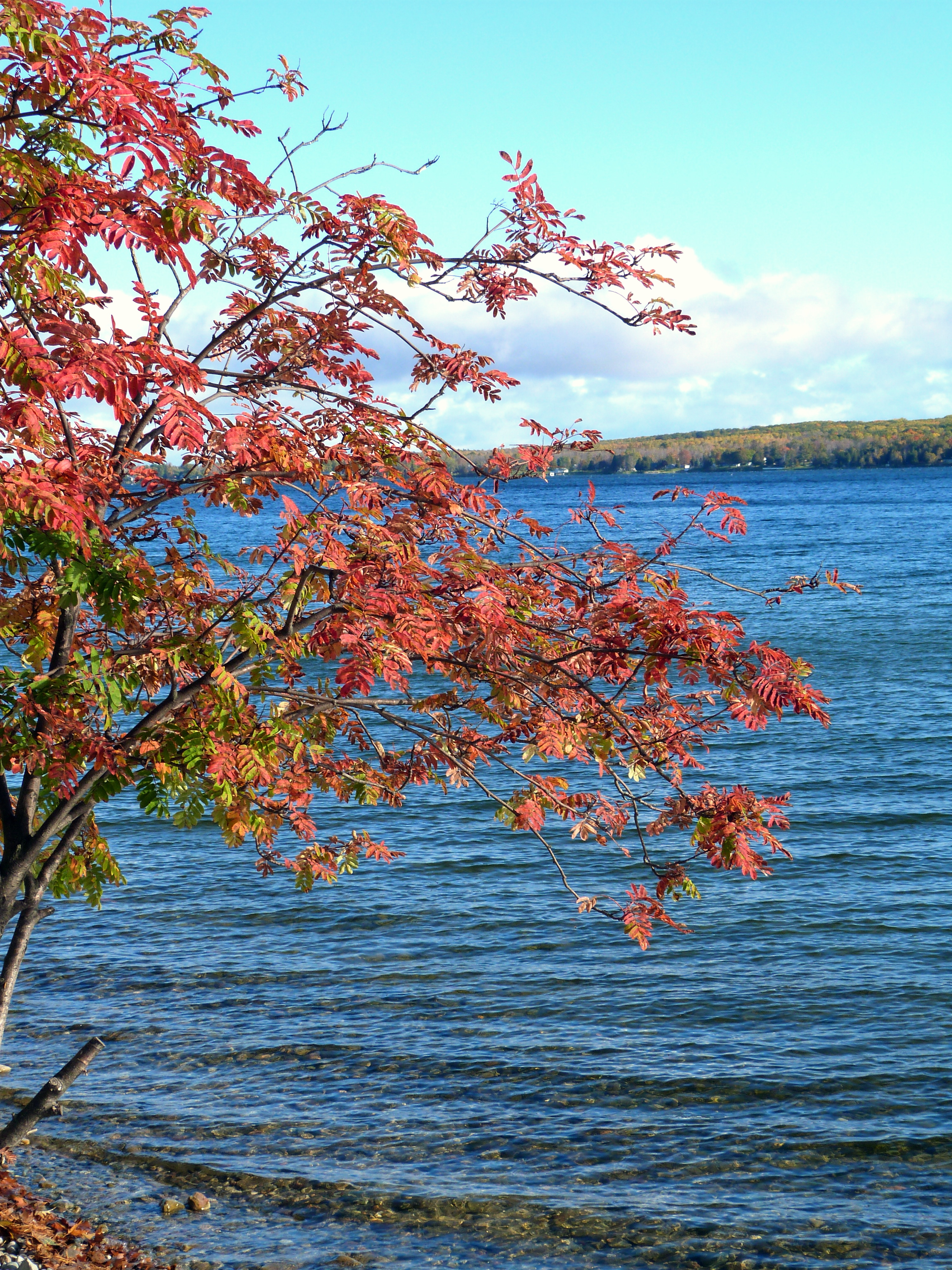
- Foliage of mountain-ash in autumn at Hubbard Lake

- Location within Michigan
- Location: Alcona County, Michigan
- Coordinates: 44°48′15″N 83°33′34″W
- Type: Lake
- Basin countries: United States
- Max. length: 7 mi (11 km)
- Max. width: 2 mi (3.2 km)
- Surface area: 8,850 acres (3,580 ha)
- Average depth: 32.6 ft (9.9 m)
- Max. depth: 97.5 ft (29.7 m)
- Surface elevation: 709 ft (216 m)

Hubbard Lake is a lake in Alcona County in Northern Michigan. The lake covers 8,850 acres (35.8 km^{2}) and is seven miles (11 km) long (north-south) and two miles (3.2 km) wide. It has a maximum depth of 97.5 feet (29.7 m) with an average depth of 32.6 feet (9.9 m). The lake spans three townships: Caledonia, Alcona, and Hawes.

The lake is part of the a large tract of land (more than six million acres (24,000 km^{2})) that was ceded by the Ojibwa, Ottawa and Potawatomi to the United States in the 1819 Treaty of Saginaw. Permanent white settlers did not begin to arrive in the area until the 1830s and 1840s. At that time, the lake was known as the "Bottomless Lake". It was also for a while known as "Coral Lake" and "Alcona Lake". In 1867, it was named "Hubbard Lake" in honor of Dr. Bela Hubbard, who was a prominent geologist in the state of Michigan.

The lake is fed by five streams. It was dammed to make it deeper for use as a float pond during the lumber boom. A concrete dam on its north end supplies power to the Alpena Power Company. "The dam, however, is capable of holding a 6.6-foot head as was maintained early this year. At the high level, wave action caused considerable damage to shore installations. According to the caretaker of the dam the lowest point possible is the 4.2-foot level."Inland Lakes of Michigan" by I. D. Scott" (1921) published by the Michigan Geological Society.

The lake is well stocked with bass, yellow perch, northern pike, trout and walleye and is a popular destination for summer angling as well as winter ice fishing. Although it is not an incorporated municipality, for statistical purposes, the U.S. Census Bureau defines the area immediately surrounding the lake as a census-designated place named Hubbard Lake. There is also a separate, small unincorporated community named Hubbard Lake located about one mile (1.6 km) north of the lake in Ossineke Township in neighboring Alpena County.

== See also ==
- List of lakes in Michigan
