= Hubbard Lake, Alcona County, Michigan =

Hubbard Lake, Michigan
- Census-designated place (CDP) & unincorporated community
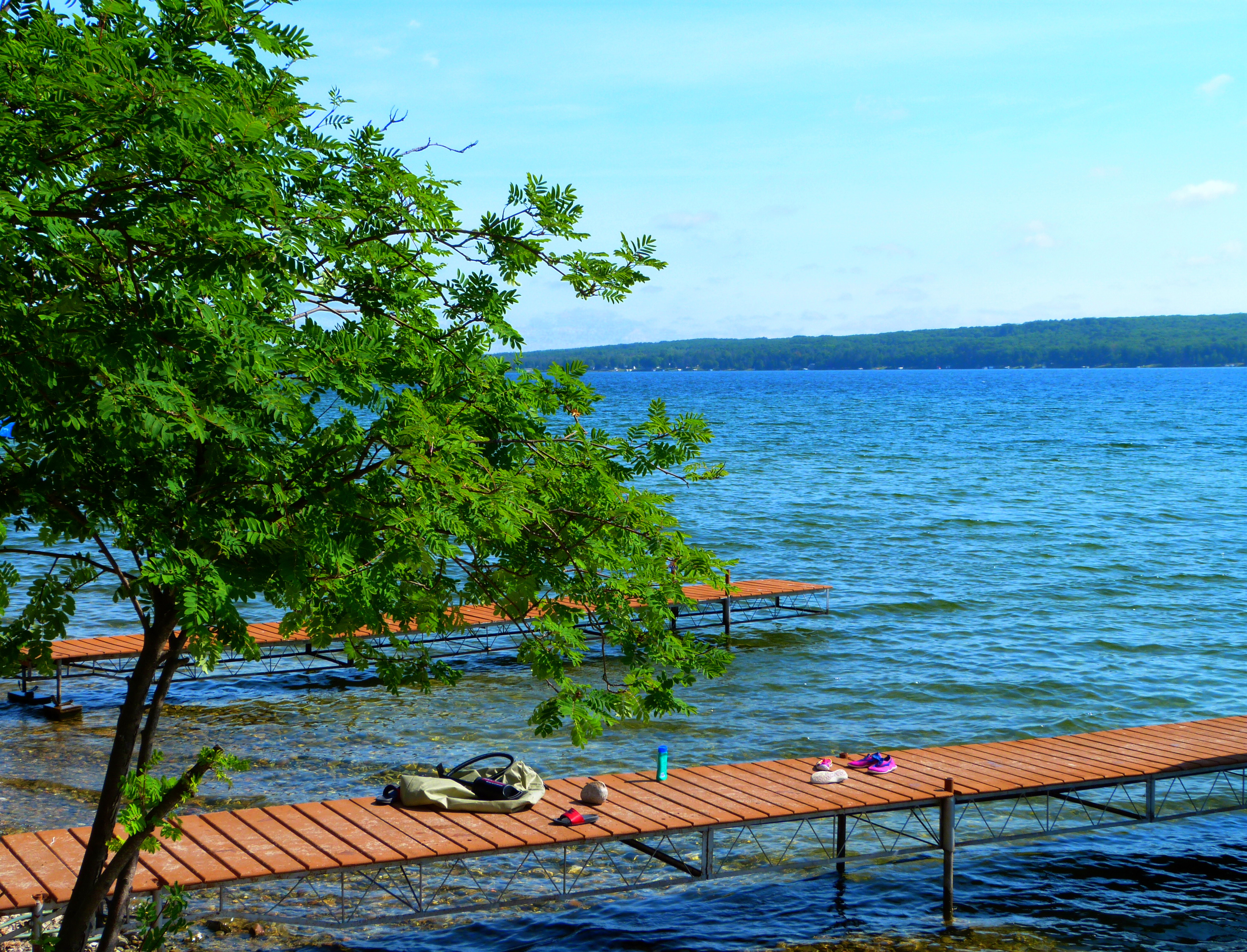
- Northwestern coast of Hubbard Lake

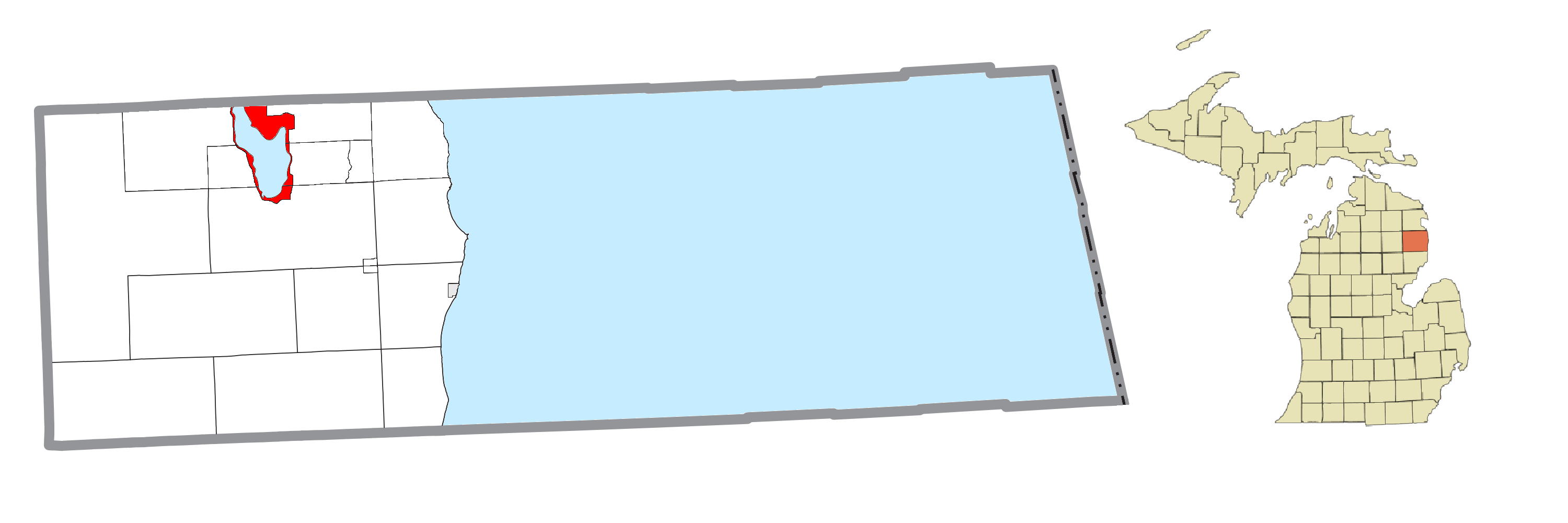
- Location within Alcona County

- Location in Michigan Location in the United States
- Coordinates: 44°45′35″N 83°33′32″W
- Country: United States
- State: Michigan
- County: Alcona
- Townships: Alcona, Caledonia, and Hawes

Area
  - Total: 22.55 sq mi (58.41 km^{2})
  - Land: 8.74 sq mi (22.63 km^{2})
  - Water: 13.81 sq mi (35.78 km^{2})
- Elevation: 748 ft (228 m)

Population (2020)
  - Total: 857
  - Density: 98.1/sq mi (37.88/km^{2})
- Time zone: UTC-5 (Eastern (EST))
  - Summer (DST): UTC-4 (EDT)
- ZIP code(s): 48762 (Spruce); 49747 (Hubbard Lake)
- Area code: 989
- FIPS code: 26-39634
- GNIS feature ID: 1852243

Hubbard Lake is an unincorporated community and census-designated place (CDP) in Alcona County in the U.S. state of Michigan. The population was 857 at the 2020 census. Hubbard Lake occupies portions of Alcona, Caledonia, and Hawes township.

The CDP surrounds Hubbard Lake and also includes the unincorporated communities of Backus Beach and Larson Beach.

== Geography ==
According to the U.S. Census Bureau, the CDP has a total area of 22.55 square miles (58.40 km^{2}), of which 8.74 square miles (22.64 km^{2}) is land and 13.81 square miles (35.77 km^{2}) (61.24%) is water.

== Demographics ==
Historical population
Census	Pop.	Note	%±
2000	993		—
2010	1,002		0.9%
2020	857		−14.5%
U.S. Decennial Census

As of the census of 2000, there were 993 people, 491 households, and 341 families residing in the CDP. The population density was 112.1 inhabitants per square mile (43.3/km^{2}). There were 1,409 housing units at an average density of 159.1 units per square mile (61.4 units/km^{2}). The racial makeup of the CDP was 98.89% White, 0.20% Asian, and 0.91% from two or more races. Hispanic or Latino of any race were 0.30% of the population.

There were 491 households, out of which 11.2% had children under the age of 18 living with them, 64.4% were married couples living together, 3.1% had a female householder with no husband present, and 30.5% were non-families. 27.3% of all households were made up of individuals, and 16.7% had someone living alone who was 65 years of age or older. The average household size was 2.01 and the average family size was 2.38.

In the CDP, the population was spread out, with 9.9% under the age of 18, 3.3% from 18 to 24, 14.2% from 25 to 44, 38.0% from 45 to 64, and 34.6% who were 65 years of age or older. The median age was 60 years. For every 100 females, there were 101.8 males. For every 100 females age 18 and over, there were 102.0 males.

The median income for a household in the CDP was $38,611, and the median income for a family was $41,827. Males had a median income of $32,250 versus $27,500 for females. The per capita income for the CDP was $24,550. About 4.7% of families and 7.0% of the population were below the poverty line, including 2.8% of those under age 18 and 5.8% of those age 65 or over.

== Education ==
The Hubbard Lake CDP is served entirely by Alcona Community Schools.
