= Mikado Township, Michigan =

- Civil township
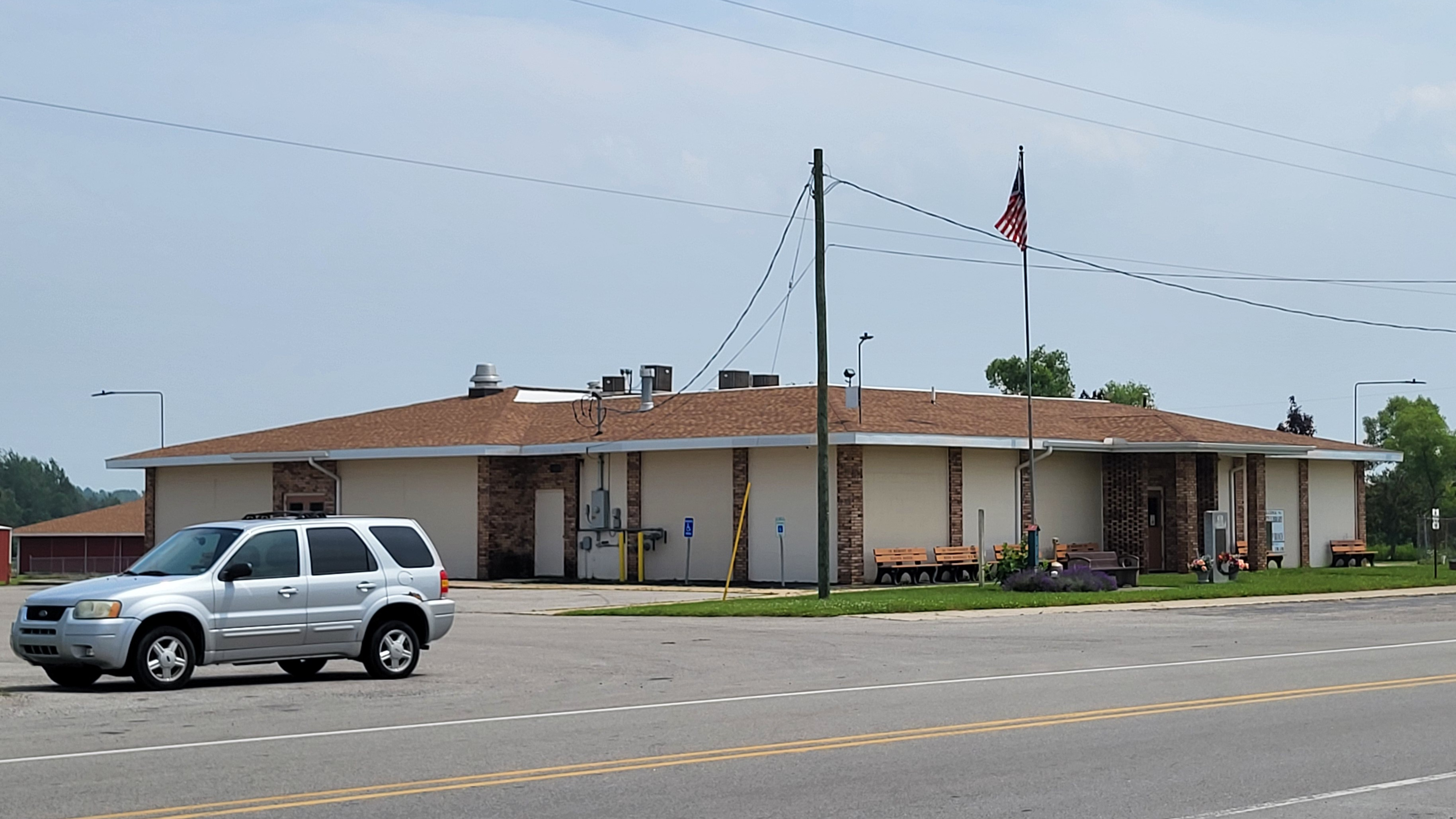
- Mikado Civic Center along F-41 in Mikado

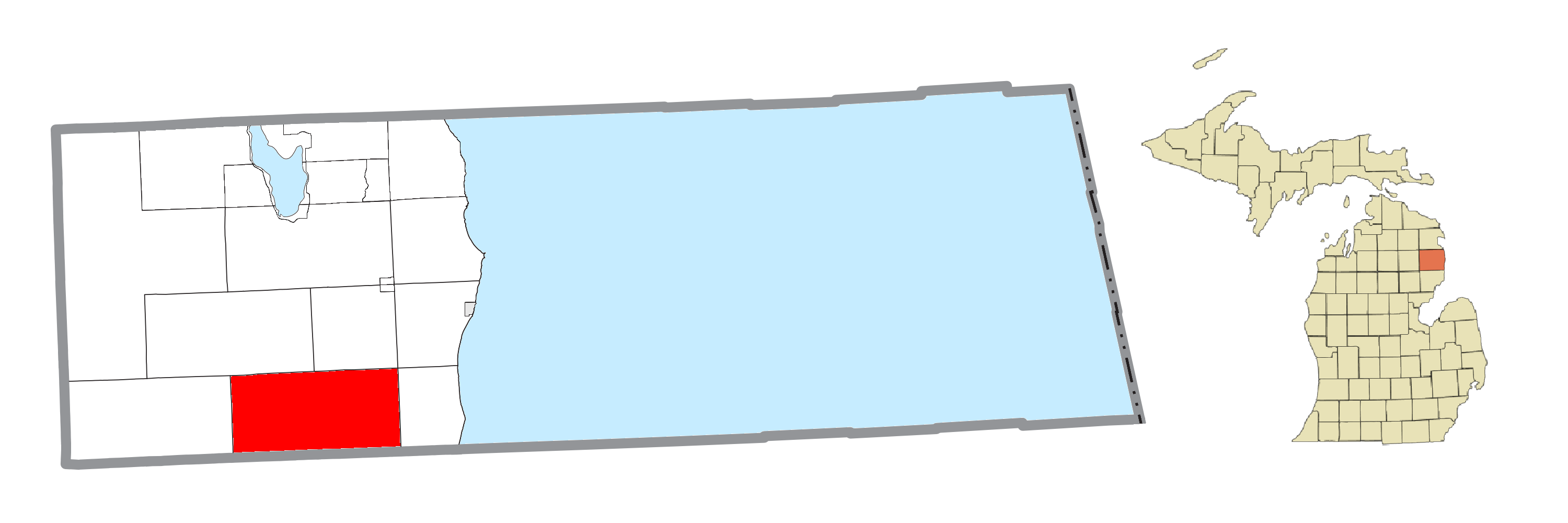
- Location within Alcona County

- Location within the state of Michigan Location within the United States
- Coordinates: 44°33′50″N 83°31′45″W
- Country: United States
- State: Michigan
- County: Alcona

Government
  - Supervisor: Jesus Yruegas
  - Clerk: Rita Sands

Area
  - Total: 71.42 sq mi (185.0 km^{2})
  - Land: 71.36 sq mi (184.8 km^{2})
  - Water: 0.06 sq mi (0.16 km^{2})
- Elevation: 682 ft (208 m)

Population (2020)
  - Total: 850
  - Density: 12/sq mi (4.6/km^{2})
- Time zone: UTC-5 (Eastern (EST))
  - Summer (DST): UTC-4 (EDT)
- ZIP code(s): 48737 (Glennie); 48745 (Mikado)
- Area code: 989
- FIPS code: 26-53880
- GNIS feature ID: 1626738
- Website: Official website

Mikado Township (/maɪˈkeɪˈdoʊ/ my-KAY-doe) is a civil township of Alcona County in the U.S. state of Michigan. The population was 850 at the 2020 census.

== Communities ==
- Alvin is an unincorporated community located in the southeastern portion of the township at 44°31′28″N 83°26′33″W. Alvin was founded as a lumbering community and had its own post office from February 14, 1906 until February 15, 1911.
- Kurtz is an unincorporated community on the western border of the township with Curtis Township at 44°33′40″N 83°38′44″W. The community was named for Hugo Kurtz, and it began as a logging community around 1900. A post office opened briefly from July 31, 1909 until March 31, 1911.
- Mikado is an unincorporated community in the northeastern corner of the township at 44°35′27″N 83°25′22″W.

== Geography ==
According to the U.S. Census Bureau, the township has a total area of 71.42 square miles (185.0 km^{2}), of which 71.36 square miles (184.8 km^{2}) is land and 0.06 square miles (0.16 km^{2}) (0.08%) is water.

=== Major highways ===
- F-30 is a county-designated highway that runs through the northern portion of the township.
- F-41 is a county-designated highway that runs along the eastern edge of the township and intersects with F-30 in Mikado.

== Demographics ==
Historical population
Census	Pop.	Note	%±
1960	617		—
1970	636		3.1%
1980	865		36.0%
1990	852		−1.5%
2000	1,043		22.4%
2010	947		−9.2%
2020	850		−10.2%
Source: Census Bureau. Census 1960- 2000, 2010.

As of the census of 2000, there were 1,043 people, 397 households, and 296 families residing in the township. The population density was 14.6 inhabitants per square mile (5.6/km^{2}). There were 666 housing units at an average density of 9.3 per square mile (3.6/km^{2}). The racial makeup of the township was 96.64% White, 2.30% Native American, 0.10% from other races, and 0.96% from two or more races. Hispanic or Latino of any race were 0.86% of the population.

There were 397 households, out of which 28.0% had children under the age of 18 living with them, 64.2% were married couples living together, 4.3% had a female householder with no husband present, and 25.2% were non-families. 20.4% of all households were made up of individuals, and 9.6% had someone living alone who was 65 years of age or older. The average household size was 2.60 and the average family size was 2.97.

In the township the population was spread out, with 25.7% under the age of 18, 5.0% from 18 to 24, 26.0% from 25 to 44, 27.3% from 45 to 64, and 16.0% who were 65 years of age or older. The median age was 40 years. For every 100 females, there were 113.3 males. For every 100 females age 18 and over, there were 105.6 males.

The median income for a household in the township was $31,713, and the median income for a family was $35,417. Males had a median income of $30,375 versus $19,261 for females. The per capita income for the township was $16,886. About 6.9% of families and 14.2% of the population were below the poverty line, including 18.1% of those under age 18 and 12.8% of those age 65 or over.

== Education ==
Mikado Township is served by two public school districts. The majority of the township is served by Oscoda Area Schools to the south in Iosco County, while a small northwestern portion of the township is served by Alcona Community Schools.
