= Millen Township, Michigan =

- Civil township
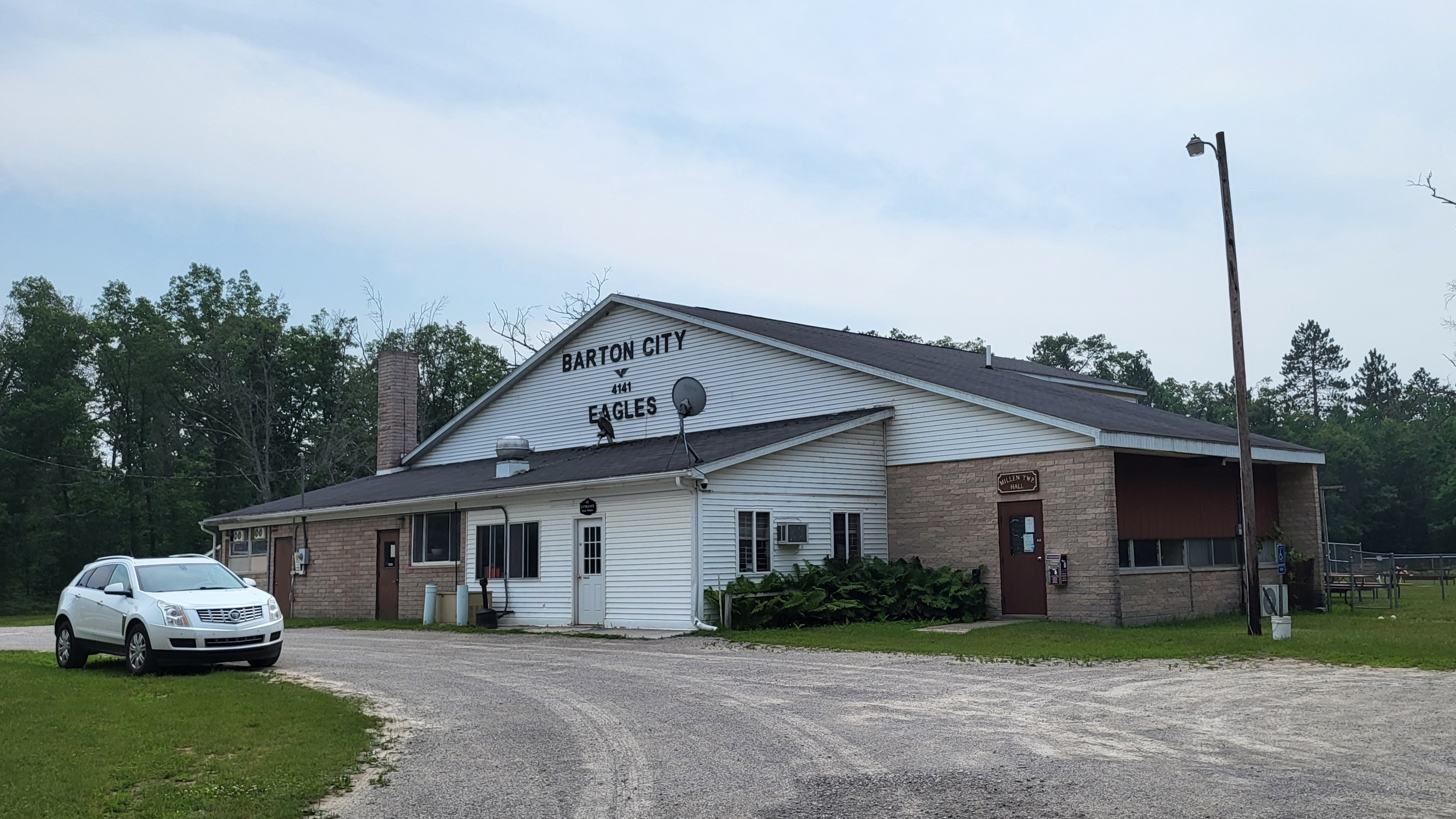
- Millen Township Hall

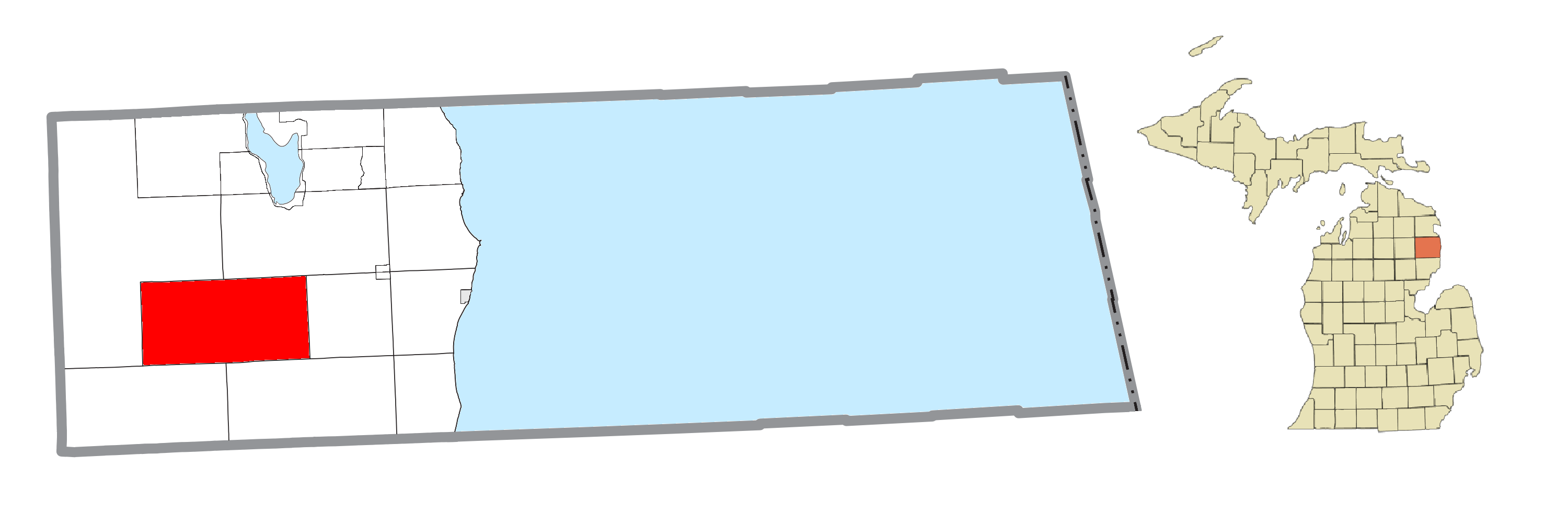
- Location within Alcona County

- Location within the state of Michigan Location within the United States
- Coordinates: 44°38′28″N 83°38′08″W
- Country: United States
- State: Michigan
- County: Alcona

Government
  - Supervisor: Jim Burger
  - Clerk: Gloria Burger

Area
  - Total: 71.27 sq mi (184.6 km^{2})
  - Land: 70.78 sq mi (183.3 km^{2})
  - Water: 0.49 sq mi (1.3 km^{2})
- Elevation: 860 ft (262 m)

Population (2020)
  - Total: 362
  - Density: 5.11/sq mi (1.97/km^{2})
- Time zone: UTC-5 (Eastern (EST))
  - Summer (DST): UTC-4 (EDT)
- ZIP code(s): 48705 (Barton City); 48728 (Curran); 48737 (Glennie); 48745 (Mikado)
- Area code: 989
- FIPS code: 26-54060
- GNIS feature ID: 1626743
- Website: Official website

Historical population
Census	Pop.	Note	%±
1960	318		—
1970	270		−15.1%
1980	364		34.8%
1990	417		14.6%
2000	463		11.0%
2010	404		−12.7%
2020	362		−10.4%
Source: Census Bureau. Census 1960- 2000, 2010.

Millen Township is a civil township of Alcona County in the U.S. state of Michigan. The population was 362 at the 2020 census.

== Communities ==
- Barton City is an unincorporated community located at 44°41′03″N 83°36′20″W in the north-central portion of the township. Most of the community is within the southwest portion of Hawes Township.

== Geography ==
According to the U.S. Census Bureau, the township has a total area of 71.27 square miles (184.59 km^{2}), of which 70.78 square miles (183.32 km^{2}) is land and 0.49 square miles (1.27 km^{2}) (0.69%) is water.

=== Major highways ===
- M-65 runs along the western border of the township.
- M-72 runs east–west through the central portion of the township and intersects with M-65

== Demographics ==
As of the census of 2000, there were 463 people, 202 households, and 139 families residing in the township. The population density was 6.6 per square mile (2.5/km^{2}). There were 541 housing units at an average density of 7.7 units per square mile (3.0 units/km^{2}). The racial makeup of the township was 96.11% White, 1.94% Native American, 1.08% Asian, 0.22% from other races, and 0.65% from two or more races. Hispanic or Latino of any race were 2.59% of the population.

There were 202 households, out of which 20.3% had children under the age of 18 living with them, 60.4% were married couples living together, 4.0% had a female householder with no husband present, and 30.7% were non-families. 27.7% of all households were made up of individuals, and 13.9% had someone living alone who was 65 years of age or older. The average household size was 2.24 and the average family size was 2.65.

In the township the population was spread out, with 19.2% under the age of 18, 5.0% from 18 to 24, 19.0% from 25 to 44, 32.0% from 45 to 64, and 24.8% who were 65 years of age or older. The median age was 50 years. For every 100 females, there were 104.9 males. For every 100 females age 18 and over, there were 107.8 males.

The median income for a household in the township was $26,932, and the median income for a family was $33,077. Males had a median income of $28,250 versus $18,125 for females. The per capita income for the township was $14,475. About 14.5% of families and 21.4% of the population were below the poverty line, including 29.3% of those under age 18 and 5.2% of those age 65 or over.

== Education ==
Millen Township is served entirely by Alcona Community Schools.
