= Caledonia Township, Alcona County, Michigan =

Caledonia Township, Michigan
- Civil township
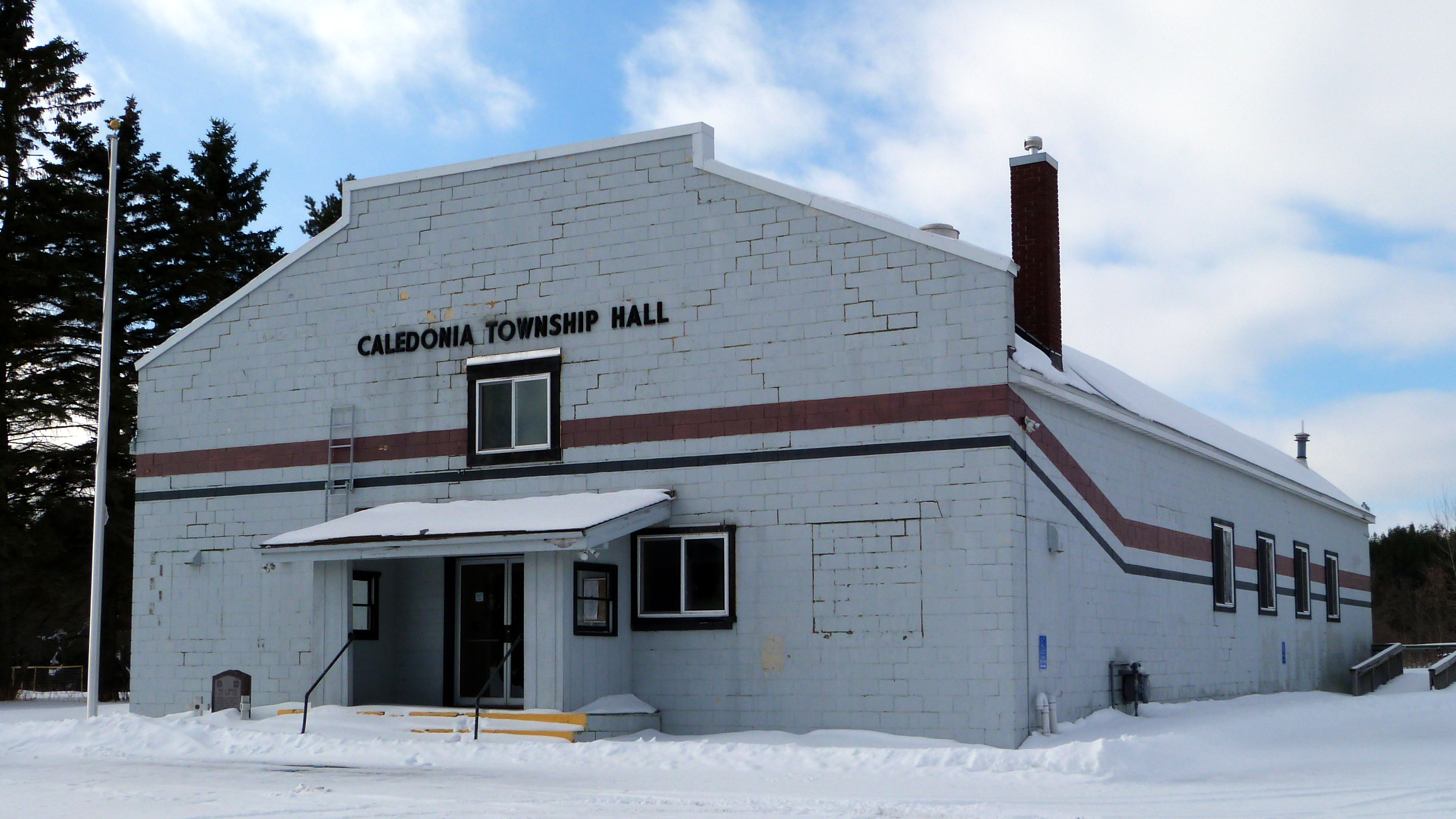
- Township Hall in the community of Spruce

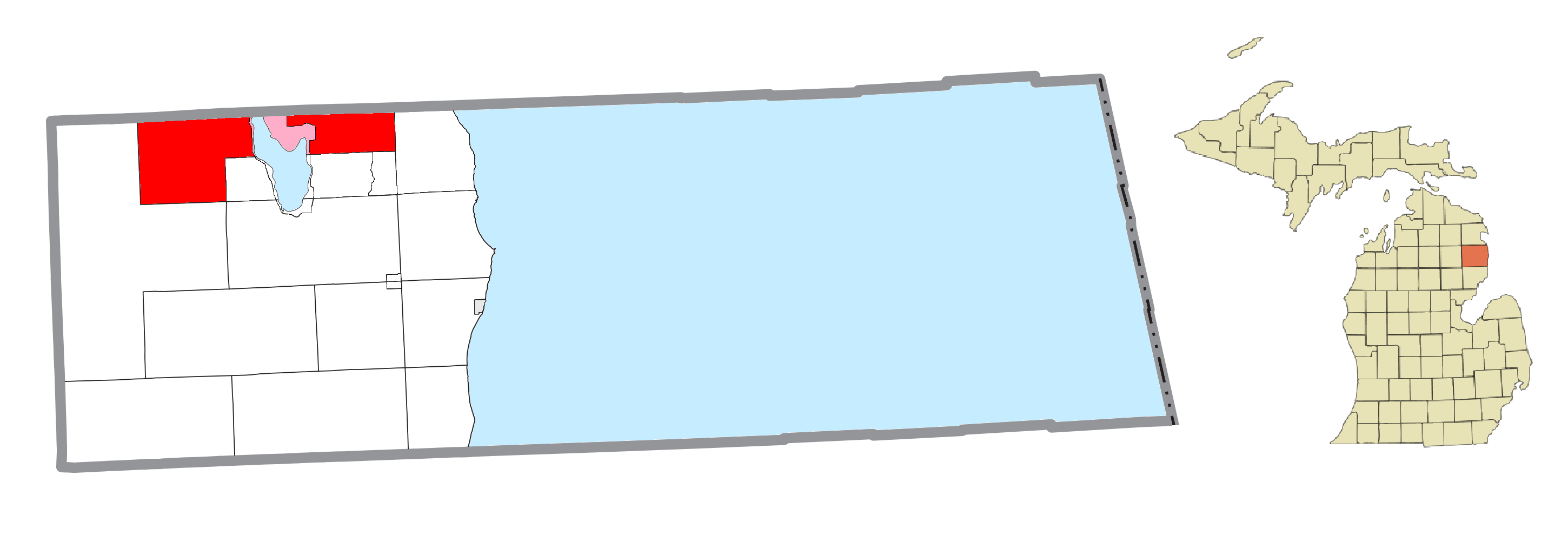
- Location within Alcona County (red) and administered portions of the Hubbard Lake community (pink)

- Location within the state of Michigan Location within the United States
- Coordinates: 44°49′39″N 83°36′49″W
- Country: United States
- State: Michigan
- County: Alcona
- Established: 1868

Government
  - Supervisor: Julie Grubbs
  - Clerk: Kerry Scott

Area
  - Total: 72.73 sq mi (188.4 km^{2})
  - Land: 67.58 sq mi (175.0 km^{2})
  - Water: 5.15 sq mi (13.3 km^{2})
- Elevation: 866 ft (264 m)

Population (2020)
  - Total: 1,032
  - Density: 15.27/sq mi (5.896/km^{2})
- Time zone: UTC-5 (Eastern (EST))
  - Summer (DST): UTC-4 (EDT)
- ZIP code(s): 48728 (Curran); 48742 (Lincoln); 48762 (Spruce); 49747 (Hubbard Lake); 49753 (Lachine)
- Area code: 989
- FIPS code: 26-12460
- GNIS feature ID: 1626019
- Website: Official website

Caledonia Township is a civil township of Alcona County in the U.S. state of Michigan. The population was 1,032 at the 2020 census.

== Communities ==
- Hubbard Lake is an unincorporated community and census-designated place that surrounds Hubbard Lake at 44°45′35″N 83°33′32″W. It should not be confused with another nearby community named Hubbard Lake just to the north in Alpena County. The CDP also extends into Alcona Township and Hawes Township.
- Spruce is an unincorporated community located in the eastern portion of the township at 44°50′39″N 83°27′57″W. The community began with the construction of a sawmill by Don Hecox, who also became the first postmaster when the rural post office opened on May 5, 1898. The Spruce post office remains open and uses the 48762 ZIP Code, which serves the eastern portion of Caledonia Township and smaller portions of several neighboring township.

== Geography ==
According to the U.S. Census Bureau, the township has a total area of 72.73 square miles (188.37 km^{2}), of which 67.58 square miles (175.03 km^{2}) is land and 5.15 square miles (13.34 km^{2}) (7.08%) is water.

The northern section of Hubbard Lake is within Caledonia Township.

=== Major highways ===
- US 23 runs briefly through the northeast corner of the township.
- F-41 is a county-designated highway that has its northern terminus as U.S. Route 23 within the township.

== Demographics ==
Historical population
Census	Pop.	Note	%±
1960	654		—
1970	763		16.7%
1980	1,065		39.6%
1990	987		−7.3%
2000	1,203		21.9%
2010	1,161		−3.5%
2020	1,032		−11.1%
Source: Census Bureau. Census 1960- 2000, 2010.

As of the census of 2000, there were 1,203 people, 535 households, and 379 families residing in the township. The population density was 17.8 inhabitants per square mile (6.9/km^{2}). There were 1,074 housing units at an average density of 15.9 units per square mile (6.1 units/km^{2}). The racial makeup of the township was 99.00% White, 0.25% Native American, 0.17% Asian, and 0.58% from two or more races. Hispanic or Latino of any race were 0.42% of the population.

There were 535 households, out of which 18.1% had children under the age of 18 living with them, 61.9% were married couples living together, 5.4% had a female householder with no husband present, and 29.0% were non-families. 24.1% of all households were made up of individuals, and 12.9% had someone living alone who was 65 years of age or older. The average household size was 2.25 and the average family size was 2.64.

In the township the population was spread out, with 16.8% under the age of 18, 5.3% from 18 to 24, 20.9% from 25 to 44, 32.3% from 45 to 64, and 24.8% who were 65 years of age or older. The median age was 50 years. For every 100 females, there were 104.6 males. For every 100 females age 18 and over, there were 105.1 males.

The median income for a household in the township was $36,000, and the median income for a family was $38,625. Males had a median income of $29,539 versus $21,964 for females. The per capita income for the township was $19,051. About 9.6% of families and 13.6% of the population were below the poverty line, including 18.7% of those under age 18 and 11.2% of those age 65 or over.

== Education ==
Caledonia Township is served entirely by Alcona Community Schools.
