= Ossineke Township, Michigan =

- Civil township
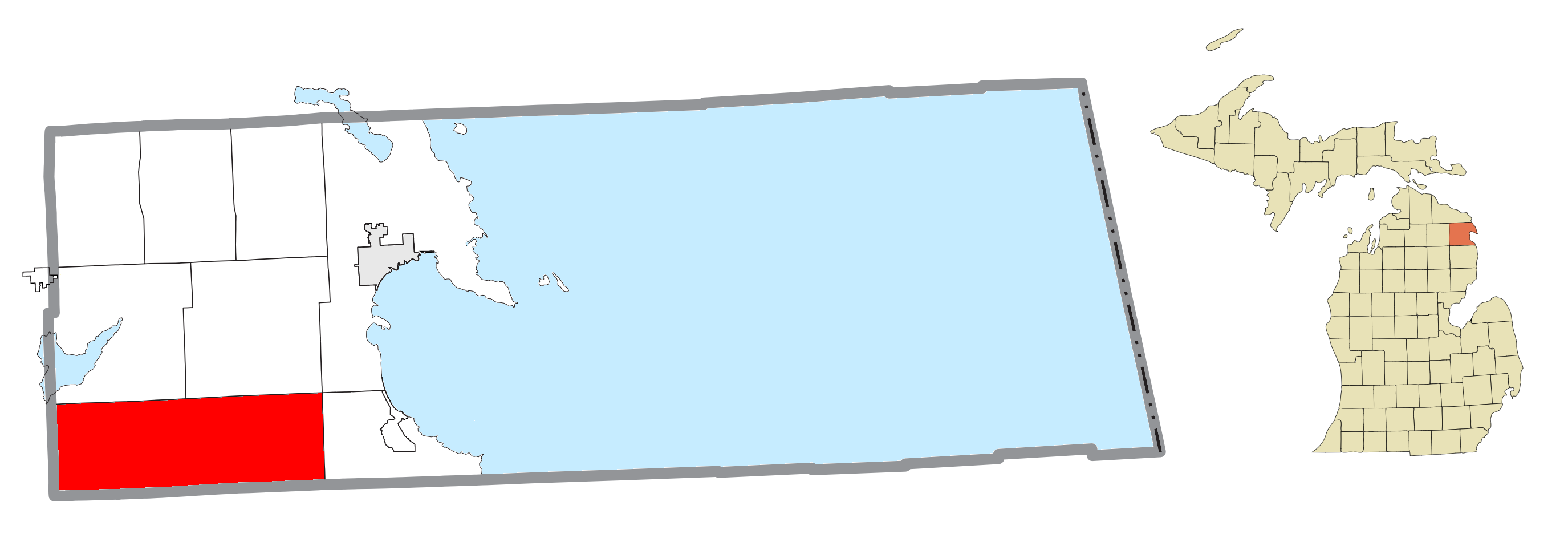
- Location within Alpena County

- Location within the state of Michigan Ossineke Township (the United States)
- Coordinates: 44°54′59″N 83°43′36″W
- Country: United States
- State: Michigan
- County: Alpena

Government
  - Supervisor: Kenneth Lobert
  - Clerk: Jo'Lee Dorie

Area
  - Total: 107.23 sq mi (277.7 km^{2})
  - Land: 105.74 sq mi (273.9 km^{2})
  - Water: 1.49 sq mi (3.9 km^{2})
- Elevation: 720 ft (220 m)

Population (2020)
  - Total: 1,635
  - Density: 15.46/sq mi (5.970/km^{2})
- Time zone: UTC-5 (Eastern (EST))
  - Summer (DST): UTC-4 (EDT)
- ZIP code(s): 48728 (Curran); 48762 (Spruce); 49707 (Alpena); 49744 (Herron); 49746 (Hillman); 49747 (Hubbard Lake); 49753 (Lachine); 49766 (Ossineke)
- Area code: 989
- FIPS code: 26-61520
- GNIS feature ID: 1626866
- Website: Official website

Ossineke Township is a civil township of Alpena County in the U.S. state of Michigan. The population was 1,635 at the 2020 census.

== Communities ==
- Hubbard Lake is an unincorporated community situated about one mile north of the water body, Hubbard Lake, which is entirely within Alcona County. The community is on the Thunder Bay River at 44°52′25″N 83°35′14″W with an elevation of 732 feet (223 m) above sea level. An early settler, John Ellsworth, began farming here in 1878. Descendants of John Ellsworth still own some of the farmland today. He became the first postmaster in June 1893. The 49747 ZIP Code also includes the northern and western shores of Lake Hubbard in Alcona County, as well as portions of western Caledonia Township and Alcona Township. In Alpena County, the ZIP code includes a large portion of central and eastern Ossineke Township and also extends into Wilson Township.

The community of Ossineke is not located within the township but is in Sanborn Township to the east.

== Geography ==
According to the United States Census Bureau, the township has a total area of 107.23 square miles (277.72 km^{2}), of which 105.74 square miles (273.87 km^{2}) is land and 1.49 square miles (3.86 km^{2}) (1.39%) is water.

== Demographics ==
As of the census of 2000, there were 1,761 people, 675 households, and 512 families residing in the township. The population density was 16.6 per square mile (6.4/km^{2}). There were 1,043 housing units at an average density of 9.8 per square mile (3.8/km^{2}). The racial makeup of the township was 98.75% White, 0.06% African American, 0.17% Native American, 0.06% Asian, and 0.97% from two or more races. Hispanic or Latino of any race were 0.57% of the population.

There were 675 households, out of which 31.4% had children under the age of 18 living with them, 66.4% were married couples living together, 5.5% had a female householder with no husband present, and 24.1% were non-families. 21.6% of all households were made up of individuals, and 10.8% had someone living alone who was 65 years of age or older. The average household size was 2.60 and the average family size was 3.02.

In the township the population was spread out, with 25.3% under the age of 18, 7.2% from 18 to 24, 25.5% from 25 to 44, 27.0% from 45 to 64, and 15.0% who were 65 years of age or older. The median age was 40 years. For every 100 females, there were 102.9 males. For every 100 females age 18 and over, there were 101.8 males.

The median income for a household in the township was $34,375, and the median income for a family was $39,643. Males had a median income of $30,461 versus $21,250 for females. The per capita income for the township was $16,473. About 6.8% of families and 10.8% of the population were below the poverty line, including 17.2% of those under age 18 and 5.4% of those age 65 or over.
