= Barton City, Michigan =

- Unincorporated community
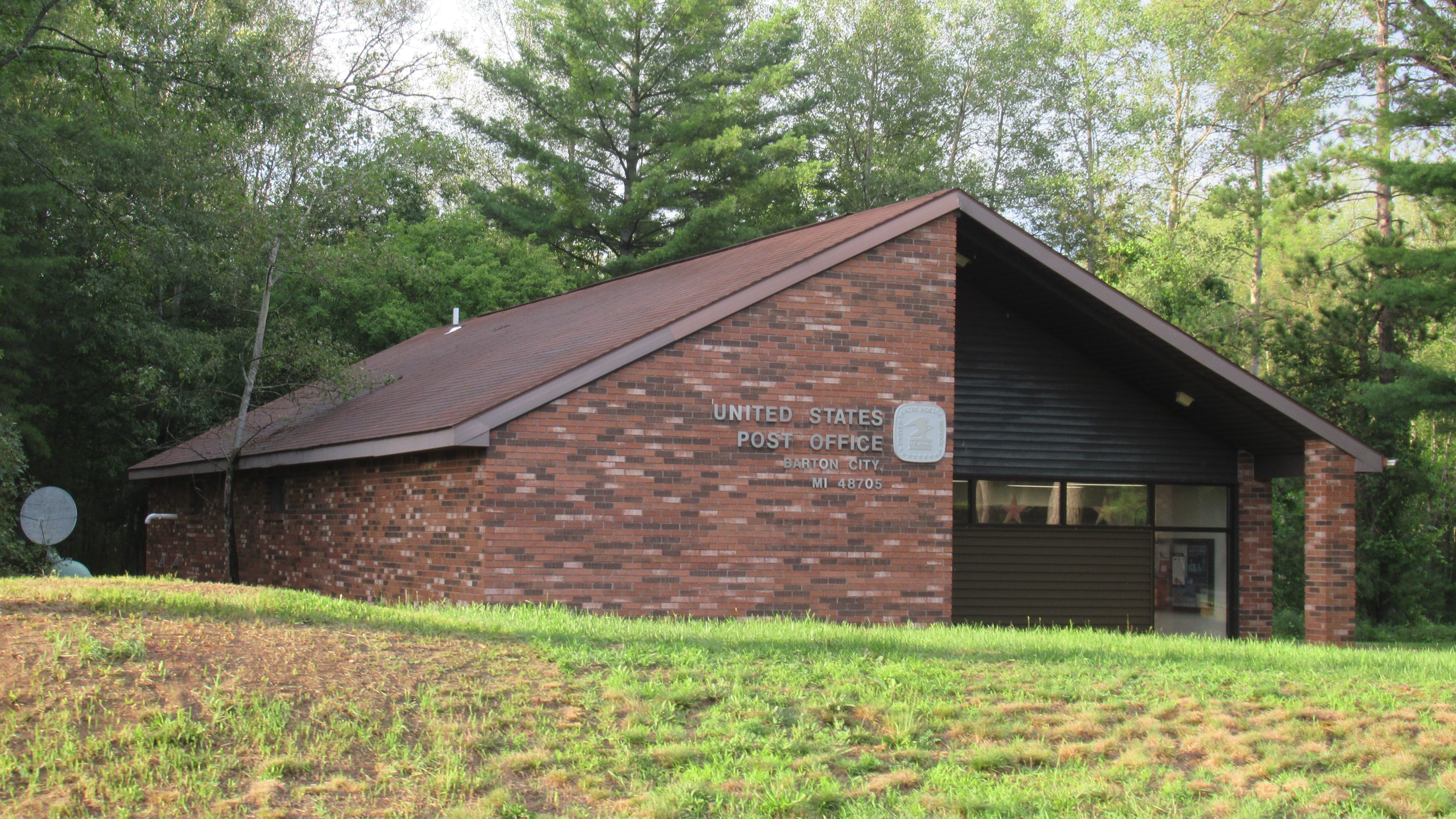
- U.S. Post Office in Barton City

- Location within the state of Michigan Location within the United States
- Coordinates: 44°41′03″N 83°36′20″W
- Country: United States
- State: Michigan
- County: Alcona
- Townships: Hawes and Millen
- Elevation: 830 ft (253 m)
- Time zone: UTC-5 (Eastern (EST))
  - Summer (DST): UTC-4 (EDT)
- ZIP code(s): 48705
- Area code: 989
- FIPS code: 26-05640
- GNIS feature ID: 620662

Barton City is an unincorporated community in Alcona County in the U.S. state of Michigan. It is situated about 2 miles north of M-72 in the Huron National Forest on the shore of Jewell Lake. Most of the community is within Millen Township, although nearby settlement extends north into Hawes Township. The ZIP code, 48705, serves a much larger area including large portions of Millen, Hawes, and Mitchell Township. There is a Barton City Chamber of Commerce, the Biggest little Chamber in the North. Barton City also home of the Biggest little 4th in the North

== History ==
Barton City is at 44°41′03″N 83°36′20″W with an elevation of 830 feet (250 m) above sea level.

Barton City was the site of the main branch of the Potts Lumbering Company and the Loud Lumbering Company. First called "Mud Lake", because of its location on the shores of what is now known as Jewell Lake, a post office named Mud Lake was established on March 10, 1887, with George W. LaChapelle as postmaster. In 1912, two surveyors staying at the home of resident Frank Barton, laid out a town around the lake, sold lots, and named the town for Barton. The name of the post office was changed to Barton City on April 1, 1912.

Barton City boasts "the biggest little Fourth in the North" - a two-day festival in the city park on Fourth of July weekend including a grease pole competition, sawdust pile, a flea market and a beer tent. The city also puts on a fireworks show on the evening of July 4 every year.
