= Alcona Community Schools =

School district in Michigan

Address
- 51 North Barlow Road Harrisville, Alcona County, Michigan, 48740; United States

District information
- Type: Public
- Grades: K–12
- Superintendent: Daniel O’Connor
- Schools: 2
- Budget: $12,406,000 (2022–23) expenditures
- NCES District ID: 2602160

Students and staff
- Students: 687 (2024–25)
- Teachers: 51.81 (2024–25) (on an FTE basis)
- Staff: 103.85 FTE (2024-25)
- Student–teacher ratio: 13.26 (2024–25)
- Athletic conference: North Star League
- District mascot: Tigers
- Colors: Blue & Gold

Other information
- Website: alconaschools.net

Alcona Community Schools is a public school district in Alcona County, in Northern Michigan. It serves Harrison, Hubbard Lake, Lincoln, Lost Lake Woods, the townships of Alcona, Caledonia, Harrisville, Hawes, Haynes, and Millen, and parts of the townships of Gustin and Mikado.

== Schools ==
The schools are Alcona Elementary School (K–6) and Alcona Community High School (7–12). The schools share the same campus, located along Barlow Road, south of Lincoln.
