= Lincoln, Michigan =

- Village
- Village of Lincoln
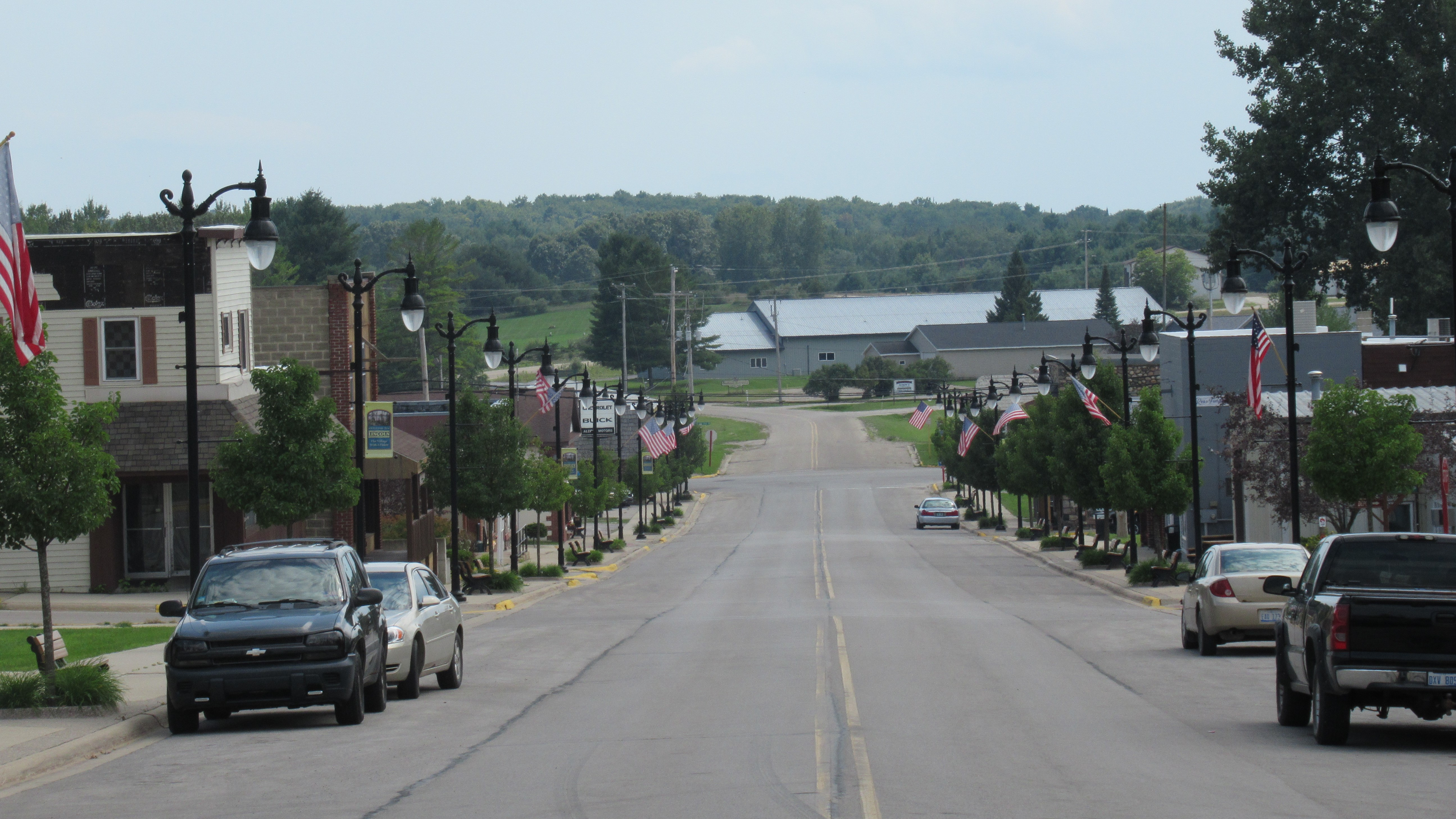
- Looking south along 2nd Street
- Motto: "The Village With A Vision"
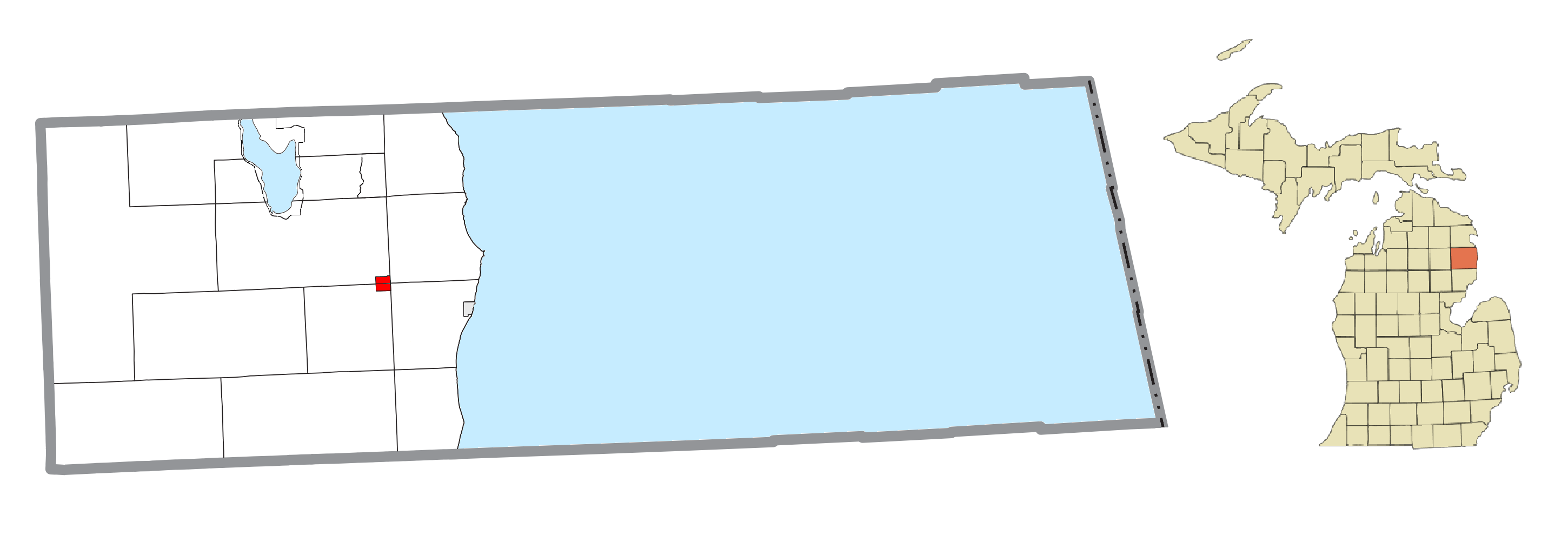
- Location within Alcona County

- Location within the state of Michigan Location within the United States
- Coordinates: 44°41′07″N 83°24′39″W
- Country: United States
- State: Michigan
- County: Alcona
- Townships: Gustin and Hawes
- Platted: 1886
- Incorporated: 1907

Government
  - Type: Village council
  - President: Shelia Phillips
  - Clerk: Linda Somers

Area
  - Total: 1.06 sq mi (2.74 km^{2})
  - Land: 0.82 sq mi (2.13 km^{2})
  - Water: 0.23 sq mi (0.60 km^{2}) 20.95%
- Elevation: 814 ft (248 m)

Population (2020)
  - Total: 305
  - Density: 370.3/sq mi (142.99/km^{2})
- Time zone: UTC-5 (EST)
  - Summer (DST): UTC-4 (EDT)
- ZIP code: 48742
- Area code: 989
- FIPS code: 26-47560
- GNIS feature ID: 0630440
- Website: Official website

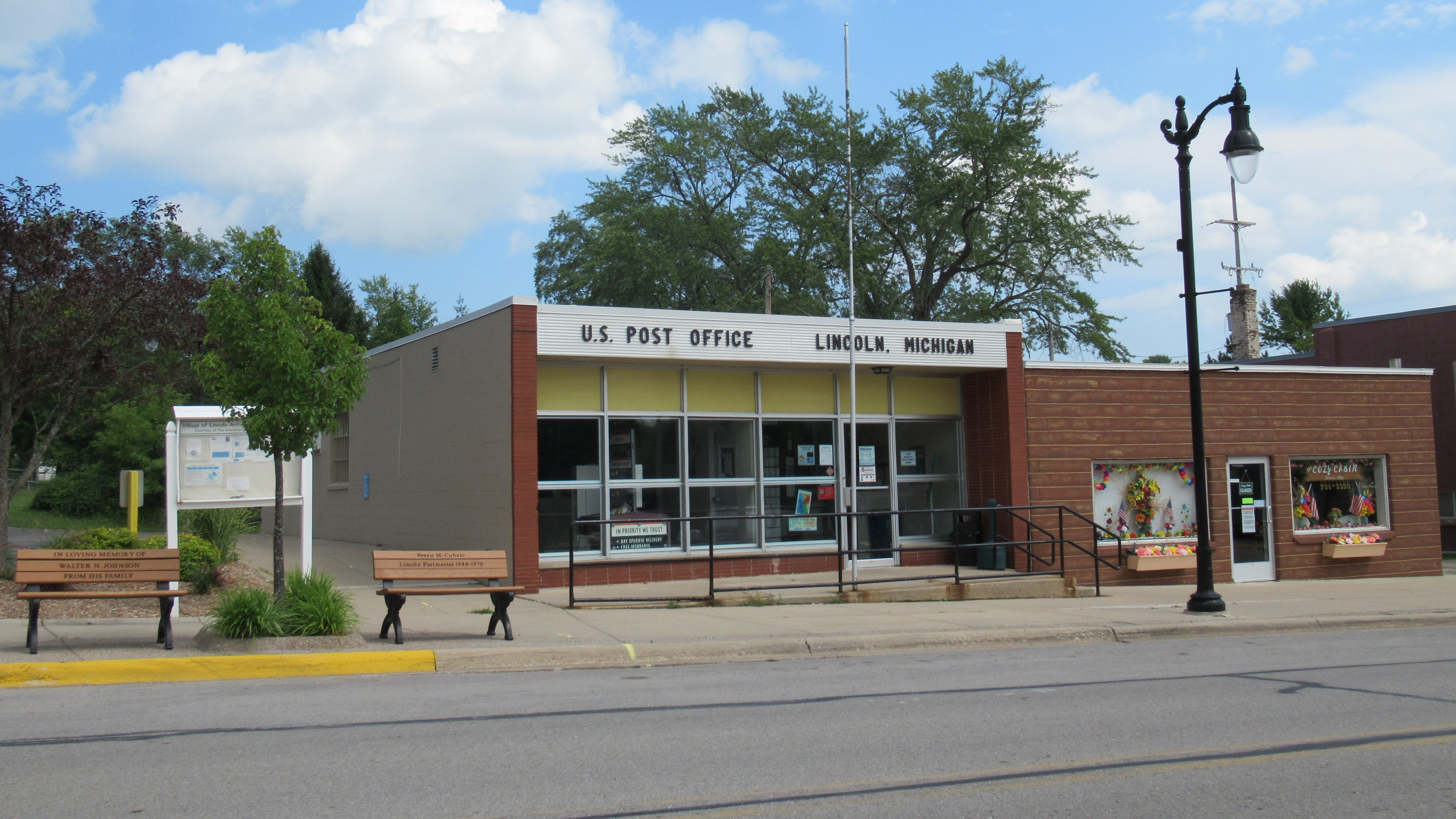
U.S. Post Office in Lincoln

Lincoln is a village in Alcona County in the U.S. state of Michigan. The population was 305 at the 2020 census.

The village is situated on the boundary between Gustin Township on the south and Hawes Township on the north. The Lincoln 48742 ZIP Code covers a much larger area extending into the townships of Alcona, Caledonia, and Haynes.

== Geography ==
According to the U.S. Census Bureau, the village has a total area of 1.05 square miles (2.72 km^{2}), of which 0.83 square miles (2.15 km^{2}) is land and 0.22 square miles (0.57 km^{2}) (20.95%) is water.

The village's large water area consists of shorelines along Brownlee Lake and Lincoln Lake.

=== Major highways ===
- F-41 is a county-designated highway that runs through the village of Lincoln.

== Demographics ==
Historical population
Census	Pop.	Note	%±
1910	122		—
1920	178		45.9%
1930	250		40.4%
1940	295		18.0%
1950	409		38.6%
1960	441		7.8%
1970	371		−15.9%
1980	361		−2.7%
1990	337		−6.6%
2000	364		8.0%
2010	337		−7.4%
2020	305		−9.5%
Source: Census Bureau. Census 1960– 2000, 2010.

=== 2010 census ===
As of the census of 2010, there were 337 people, 160 households, and 82 families residing in the village. The population density was 406.0 inhabitants per square mile (156.8/km^{2}). There were 236 housing units at an average density of 284.3 units per square mile (109.8 units/km^{2}). The racial makeup of the village was 98.2% White and 1.8% from two or more races. Hispanic or Latino of any race were 2.7% of the population.

There were 160 households, of which 23.1% had children under the age of 18 living with them, 37.5% were married couples living together, 8.1% had a female householder with no husband present, 5.6% had a male householder with no wife present, and 48.8% were non-families. 43.1% of all households were made up of individuals, and 23.1% had someone living alone who was 65 years of age or older. The average household size was 2.11 and the average family size was 2.87.

The median age in the village was 43.2 years. 19.6% of residents were under the age of 18; 9.3% were between the ages of 18 and 24; 23.1% were from 25 to 44; 21.9% were from 45 to 64; and 25.8% were 65 years of age or older. The gender makeup of the village was 46.9% male and 53.1% female.

=== 2000 census ===
As of the census of 2000, there were 364 people, 179 households, and 102 families residing in the village. The population density was 474.8 inhabitants per square mile (183.3/km^{2}). There were 246 housing units at an average density of 320.9 units per square mile (123.9 units/km^{2}). The racial makeup of the village was 98.63% White, 0.27% African American, 0.27% Native American, and 0.82% from two or more races.

There were 179 households, out of which 22.9% had children under the age of 18 living with them, 43.6% were married couples living together, 8.9% had a female householder with no husband present, and 42.5% were non-families. 39.7% of all households were made up of individuals, and 25.1% had someone living alone who was 65 years of age or older. The average household size was 2.03 and the average family size was 2.63.

In the village, the population was spread out, with 20.6% under the age of 18, 4.7% from 18 to 24, 24.5% from 25 to 44, 26.1% from 45 to 64, and 24.2% who were 65 years of age or older. The median age was 45 years. For every 100 females, there were 75.0 males. For every 100 females age 18 and over, there were 71.0 males.

The median income for a household in the village was $24,464, and the median income for a family was $29,821. Males had a median income of $30,179 versus $17,143 for females. The per capita income for the village was $16,860. About 13.1% of families and 15.7% of the population were below the poverty line, including 12.0% of those under age 18 and 20.9% of those age 65 or over.

== Education ==
The village of Lincoln is served entirely by Alcona Community Schools.

== Local events ==
- The annual Alcona County Fair is located at the Alcona Recreation Area site in Lincoln, Michigan and is held near the end of August.

=== Lincoln Train Depot ===
The Lincoln Train Depot, originally called the "West Harrisville Depot", was built in 1886 by the Detroit, Bay City and Alpena Railroad, a predecessor to the Detroit and Mackinac Railway. It is the last remaining depot of its type in northeastern Michigan and is a standing reminder of Michigan's former dependence on the railroads. It is located on Lake Street at Fisk Street in downtown Lincoln and served the community and the surrounding area until 1929. Rail service passed through Lincoln from the south and north through Ossineke to Alpena. It is now owned by the Lincoln downtown Development Authority. In December 1998, the Lincoln Depot was officially recognized as a Michigan Historic Site. Hours are from 1–4 pm Monday through Friday The Train Depot is the locale of Depot Days, a fund raising event sponsored by the Alcona Historical Society. The display includes a restored caboose and a switching engine from the D&M Railway.

There are other D&M depots in Standish and Harrisville, Michigan.

== Media ==
=== Newspapers ===
- The Alcona County Review, located in Harrisville, is the newspaper of record, and has served the community since 1877.
- The Alpena News is the daily newspaper of record for much of northeastern lower peninsula of Michigan.
- Daily editions of the Detroit Free Press and The Detroit News are also available throughout the area.

=== Radio ===
- WXTF-LP
