= F-41 (Michigan county highway) =

County highway in Iosco and Alcona counties in Michigan, United States

F-41
- F-41 highlighted in red

Route information
- Maintained by the Iosco and Alcona county road commissions
- Length: 31.803 mi (51.182 km)
- Existed: c. October 5, 1970–present

Major junctions
- South end: US 23 in Oscoda
- M-72 in Gustin Township
- North end: US 23 in Caledonia Township

Location
- Country: United States
- State: Michigan
- Counties: Iosco, Alcona

Highway system
- County-Designated Highways
← F-38	→ F-42
← M-168	M-171	→ M-178

F-41 is a county-designated highway in the Lower Peninsula of Michigan. It was previously designated as M-171, a former state trunkline highway, until 1960, running from US Highway 23 (US 23) just north of Oscoda, and coming back to US 23 about 20 miles (32 km) south of Alpena. The road runs through rural, forested areas of Iosco and Alcona counties, inland from Lake Huron.

Although it has been a county road since 1960, F-41 was a state highway in 1919 when the state trunkline highway system was formed. It was a segment of the original M-10 that was replaced by US 23 in 1926. Later changes to US 23 shifted that road closer to Lake Huron, and the Michigan State Highway Department (MSHD) created two different routings for M-171 out of the former US 23 routings in the area. The second of these highways has been designated F-41 since 1970.

== Route description ==
F-41 begins at an intersection with US 23 on the north side of Oscoda. The route travels to the northwest away from town, passing between Van Etten Lake and what was previously Wurtsmith Air Force Base. The road continues north through a rural area of Alcona County on Somers and Mikado roads, running parallel, but inland, to the Lake Huron shoreline. It passes through the small communities of Mikado and Gustin before coming to a junction with M-72. After crossing M-72, F-41 turns east into the community of Lincoln along Traverse Bay State Road, 2nd Street and Main Street before leaving town to the north. The road continues on to the north on Barlow Road through Alcona County before terminating at a second junction with US 23.

== History ==
M-171
- Location: Oscoda – Caledonia Township
- Length: 31.803 mi (51.182 km)
- Existed: 1936–1960

The first highway designation to run from Oscoda toward Spruce to Alpena was the original M-10 on July 1, 1919. This segment of highway was later redesignated as a part of US 23 in 1926 when the United States Numbered Highway System was established. Realignments of US 23 created both versions of M-171.

The initial incarnation of M-171 served as a loop route off US 23 which departed the main highway east of Spruce, traveled west through Spruce, then north past Hubbard Lake and through Wilson before returning to US 23 near Alpena. This roadway was part of US 23 before it was redesignated M-171 in 1932. This routing is now occupied by the present day routings of Spruce, Hubbard Lake and Wilson roads. This version of M-171 was removed from the system in 1934.

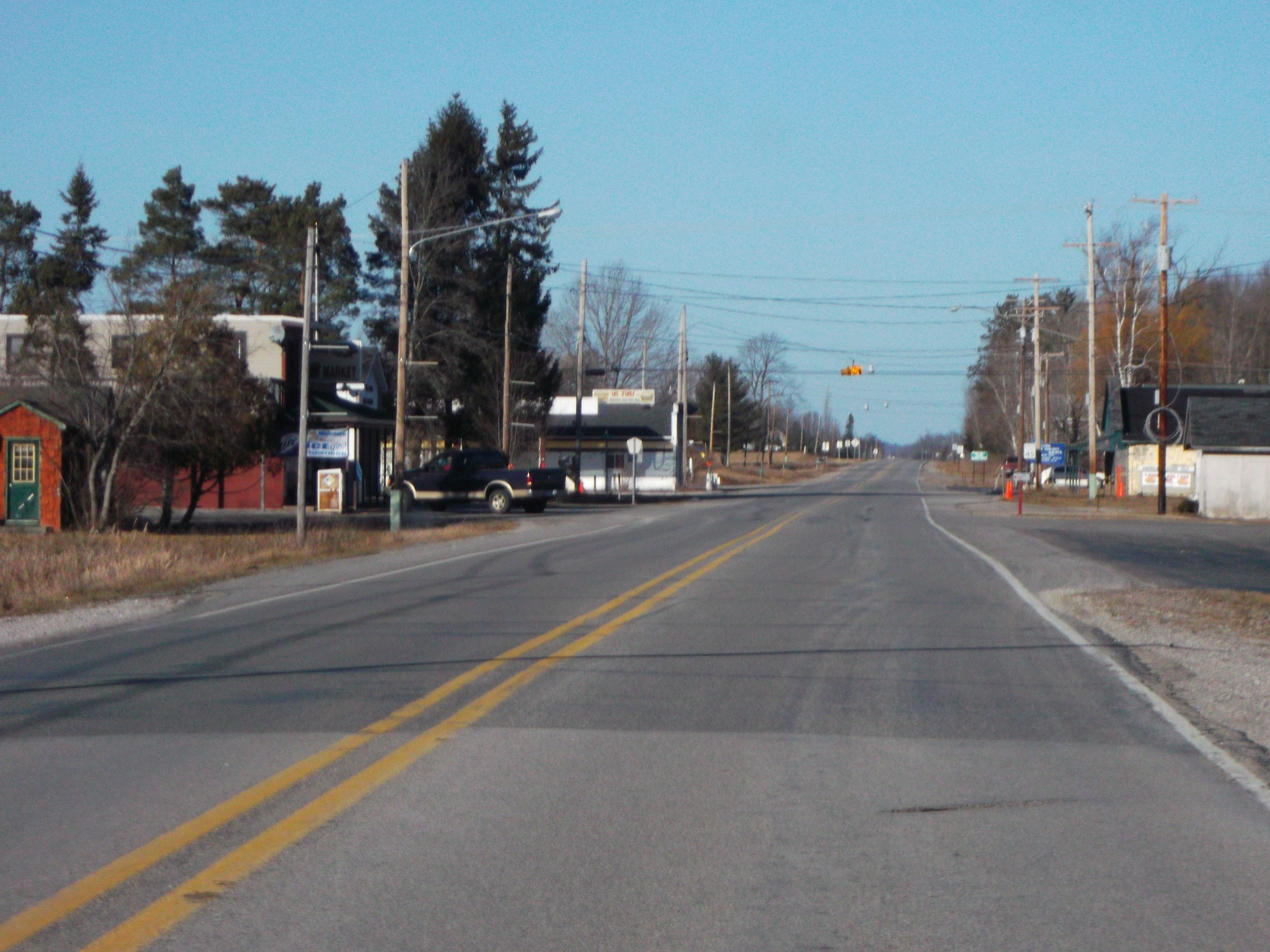
F-41 near the intersection of F-30 in Mikado Township, looking northbound

The second version of M-171 that ran between Oscoda and Caledonia Township in Alcona County was assumed into the state trunkline system in 1936. This was another former segment of US 23. Expansion of the Oscoda Army Air Field (later Wurtsmith Air Force Base) in the early 1940s shifted M-171 eastward, more closely following the west shore of Van Ettan Lake. Portions of the old route were taken up by the expansion, while the rest became part of present-day Skeel Avenue. A narrow bridge along M-171 was set for replacement in 1958 after it had been left out of a reconstruction project for the highway. M-171 existed along the Oscoda to Caledonia Township route for 24 years before being decommissioned in late 1960 or early 1961. The routing was then assigned County Road F-41 after October 5, 1970, and has retained that designation ever since.

== Major intersections ==
County	Location	mi	km	Destinations	Notes
Iosco	Oscoda	0.000	0.000	US 23 / LHCT – Tawas City	
Alcona	Mikado Township	13.284	21.379	F-30 (Mikado–Glennie Road)	
Alcona	Gustin Township	17.766	28.592	M-72 – Grayling, Harrisville	
Alcona	Caledonia Township	31.803	51.182	US 23 / LHCT – Alpena	
1.000 mi = 1.609 km; 1.000 km = 0.621 mi
