= Mitchell Township, Michigan =

- Civil township
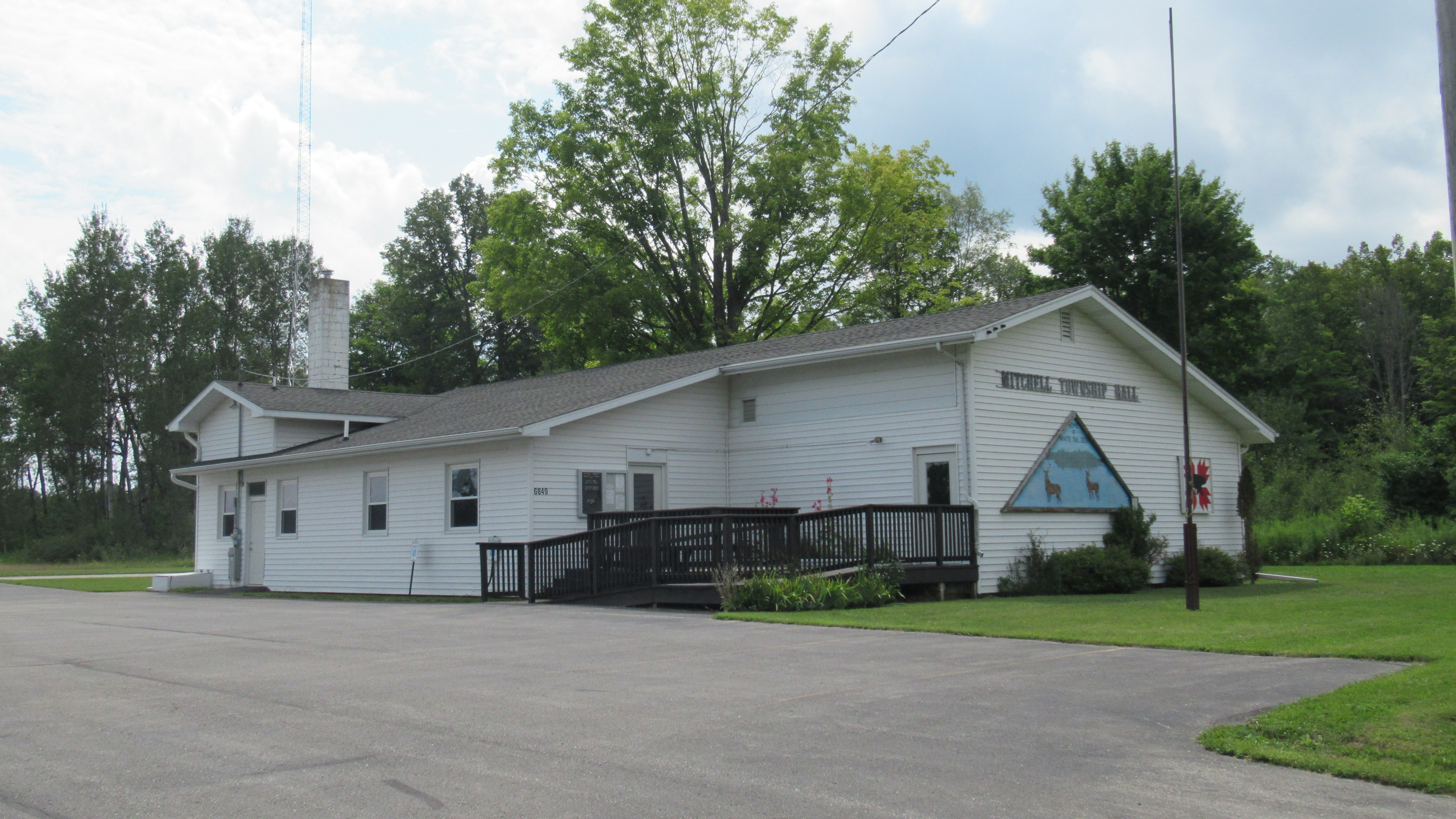
- Mitchell Township Hall in Curran
- Motto: "The Black Bear Capital of Michigan"
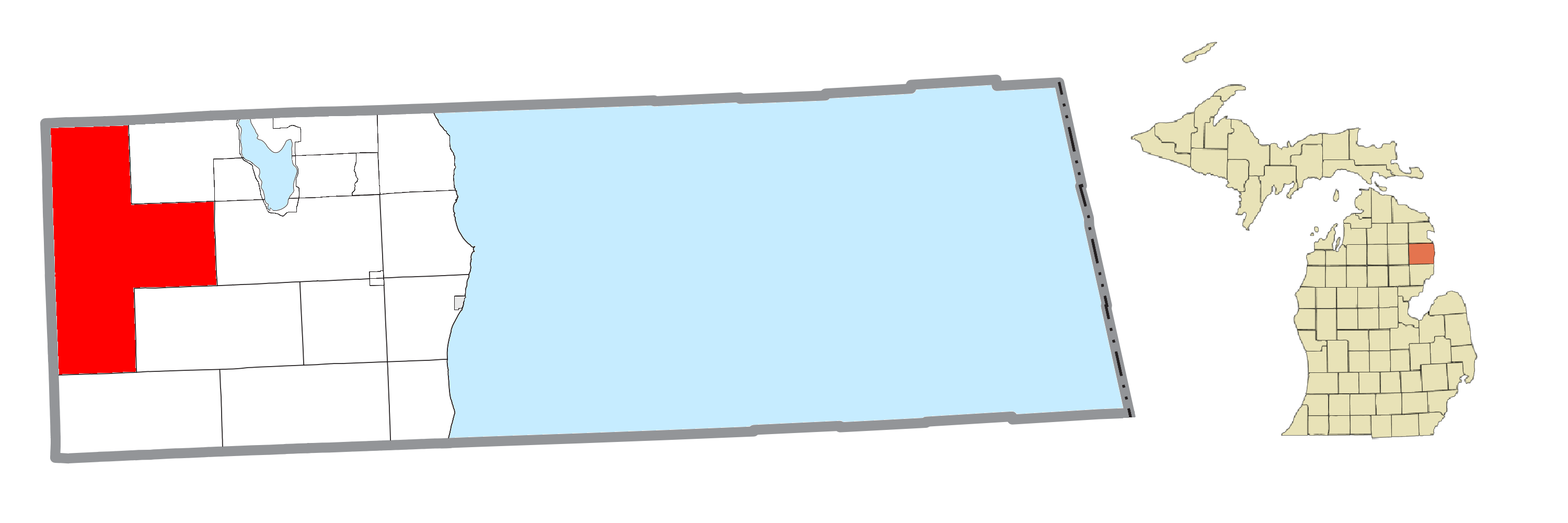
- Location within Alcona County

- Location within the state of Michigan Location within the United States
- Coordinates: 44°42′50″N 83°47′55″W
- Country: United States
- State: Michigan
- County: Alcona
- Organized: 1890

Government
  - Supervisor: Carla Brimm
  - Clerk: Donita Charron

Area
  - Total: 143.39 sq mi (371.4 km^{2})
  - Land: 142.54 sq mi (369.2 km^{2})
  - Water: 0.85 sq mi (2.2 km^{2})
- Elevation: 890 ft (270 m)

Population (2020)
  - Total: 354
  - Density: 2.47/sq mi (0.95/km^{2})
- Time zone: UTC-5 (EST)
  - Summer (DST): UTC-4 (EDT)
- ZIP code(s): 48647 (Mio); 48705 (Barton City); 48728 (Curran); 48737 (Glennie); 48761 (South Branch)
- Area code: 989
- FIPS code: 26-54740
- GNIS feature ID: 1626750
- Website: Official website

Mitchell Township is a civil township of Alcona County in the U.S. state of Michigan. The population was 354 at the 2020 census.

== Communities ==
- Curran is an unincorporated community located within the center of the township at 44°42′53″N 83°48′28″W. The Curran 48728 ZIP Code serves the majority of Mitchell Township.

== Geography ==
According to the U.S. Census Bureau, the township has a total area of 143.39 square miles (371.38 km^{2}), of which 142.54 square miles (369.18 km^{2}) is land and 0.85 square miles (2.20 km^{2}) (0.59%) is water.

=== Major highways ===
- M-65 runs north–south through the center of the township and briefly runs concurrent with M-72.
- M-72 runs through the center of the township and briefly runs concurrent with M-65.

== Demographics ==
Historical population
Census	Pop.	Note	%±
1960	220		—
1970	197		−10.5%
1980	248		25.9%
1990	290		16.9%
2000	396		36.6%
2010	352		−11.1%
2020	354		0.6%
Source: Census Bureau. Census 1960- 2000, 2010.

As of the census of 2000, there were 396 people, 193 households, and 122 families residing in the township. The population density was 2.8 per square mile (1.1/km^{2}). There were 731 housing units at an average density of 5.1 units per square mile (2.0 units/km^{2}). The racial makeup of the township was 97.73% White, 0.51% Asian, and 1.77% from two or more races. Hispanic or Latino of any race were 0.76% of the population.

There were 193 households, out of which 11.9% had children under the age of 18 living with them, 57.0% were married couples living together, 5.2% had a female householder with no husband present, and 36.3% were non-families. 30.6% of all households were made up of individuals, and 16.6% had someone living alone who was 65 years of age or older. The average household size was 2.05 and the average family size was 2.54.

In the township the population was spread out, with 15.2% under the age of 18, 2.5% from 18 to 24, 18.2% from 25 to 44, 37.4% from 45 to 64, and 26.8% who were 65 years of age or older. The median age was 53 years. For every 100 females, there were 104.1 males. For every 100 females age 18 and over, there were 108.7 males.

The median income for a household in the township was $26,875, and the median income for a family was $33,875. Males had a median income of $38,750 versus $20,000 for females. The per capita income for the township was $18,739. About 16.0% of families and 16.5% of the population were below the poverty line, including 31.8% of those under age 18 and 17.7% of those age 65 or over.

== Education ==
Mitchell Township is served entirely by Fairview Area School District to the west in Oscoda County.
