= Mikado, Michigan =

- Unincorporated community
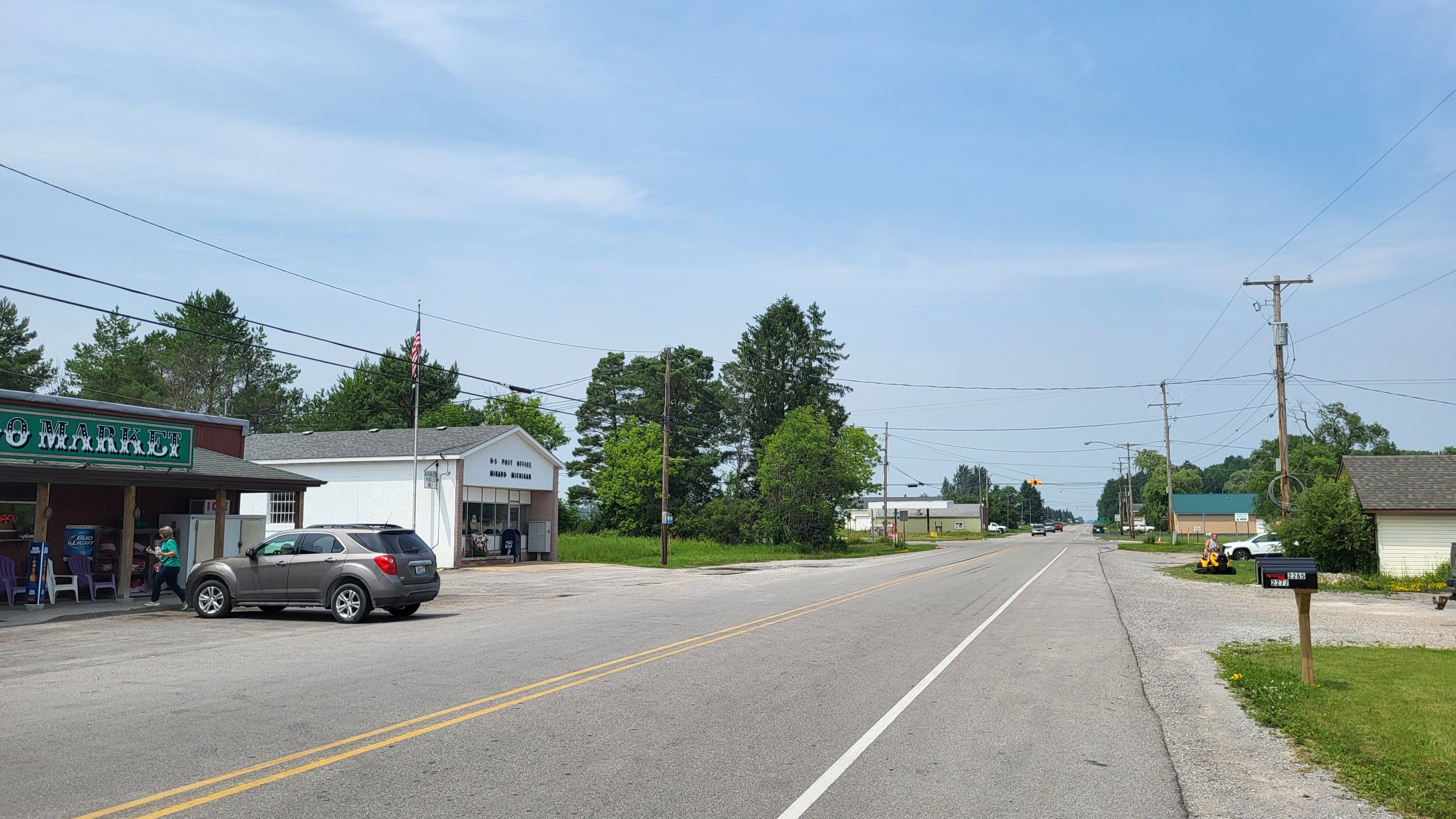
- Looking north along F-41 toward F-30

- Location within the state of Michigan Location within the United States
- Coordinates: 44°35′27″N 83°25′22″W
- Country: United States
- State: Michigan
- County: Alcona
- Township: Mikado
- Settled: 1886
- Elevation: 653 ft (199 m)
- Time zone: UTC-5 (Eastern (EST))
  - Summer (DST): UTC-4 (EDT)
- ZIP code(s): 48745
- Area code: 989
- GNIS feature ID: 632295

Mikado (/maɪˈkeɪˈdoʊ/ my-KAY-doe) is an unincorporated community in Alcona County in the U.S. state of Michigan. The community is located within Mikado Township along the intersection of county highways F-30 and F-41.

As an unincorporated community, Mikado has no legally defined boundaries or population statistics of its own but does have its own post office with the 48745 ZIP Code.

== Geography ==
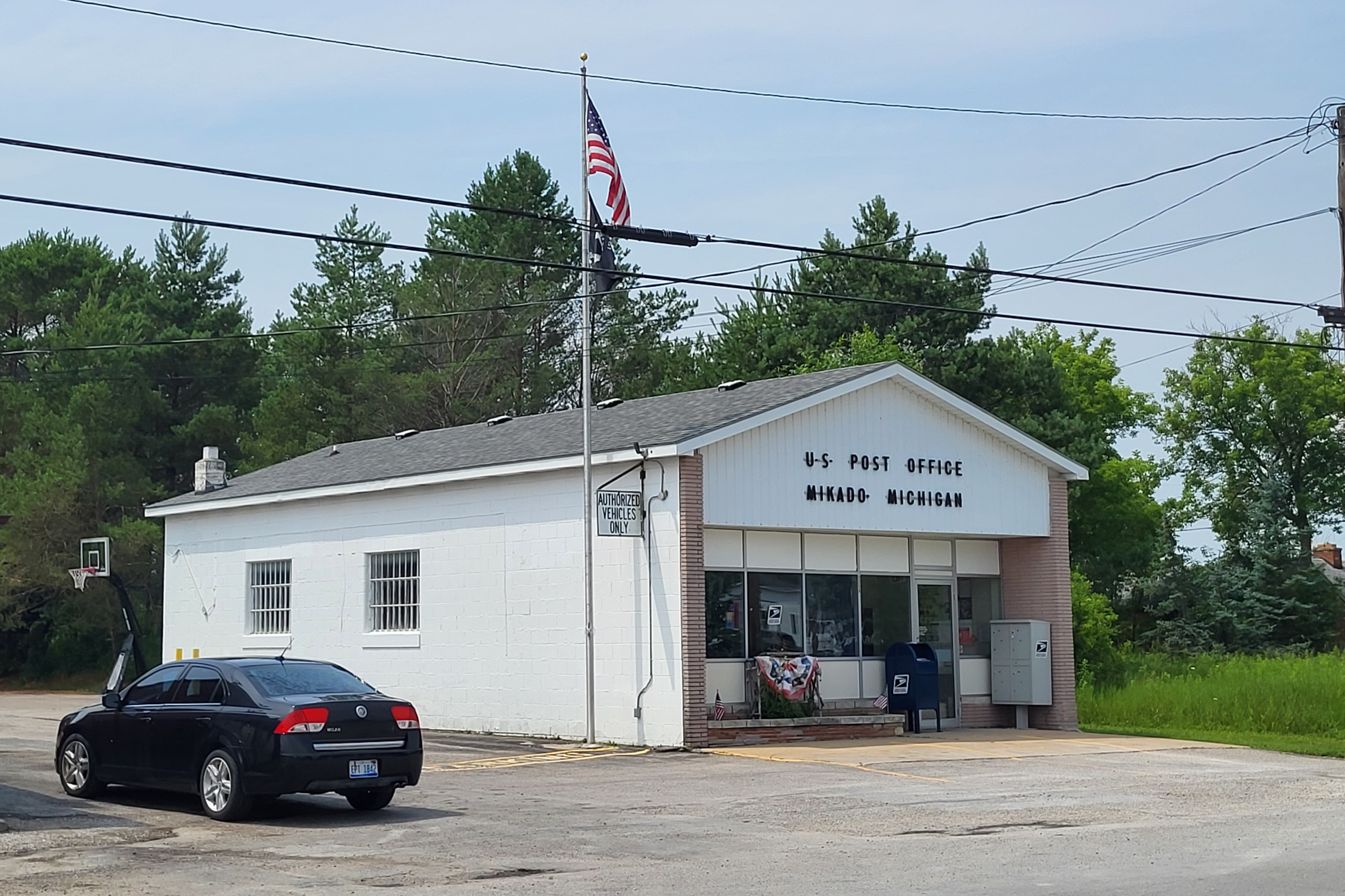
U.S. Post Office in Mikado

Mikado is a small rural community located about 30 miles (48 km) north of Tawas City. It is located in northeast Mikado Township in southern Alcona County. The community is in the Northern Michigan region a few miles inland from the Lake Huron shoreline and sits at an elevation of 653 feet (199 m) above sea level.

U.S. Route 23 runs about 5.0 miles (8.0 km) to the west along the Lake Huron shoreline, and M-72 is an equal distance to the north. The community is directly served by two county-designated highways. F-41 runs north–south, while F-30 run east–west through the center of the community. F-41 is sometimes referred to locally as Old M-171, which was its former designation as a state highway, while F-30 is referred to as Mikado–Glennie Road to the west and East Mikado Road to the east. Other nearby unincorporated communities include Gustin and Killmaster to the north, Alvin to the south, Springport to the northeast, and Greenbush to the east. The village of Lincoln is about 6.0 miles (9.7 km) to the north, and the city of Harrisville is about 10.5 miles (16.9 km) to the northeast.

Van Etten Creek is a small stream that runs through the community just to the southeast, while Pine River also flows just to the west of the community. The Mikado Township Civic Center, which houses the township government, is located within the center of the community at 2291 South F-41. Mikado is served by Oscoda Area Schools to the south in Oscoda in Iosco County.

Mikado has its own post office that uses the 48745 ZIP Code. The post office is located in the center of the community at 2256 South F-41. The post office serves a large area that includes the majority of Mikado Township, the southwest portion of Harrisville Township, the western portion of Greenbush Township, and the southeast portion of Millen Township. The post office also serves the northwestern portion of Oscoda Township to the south in Iosco County.

== History ==
=== Early history ===
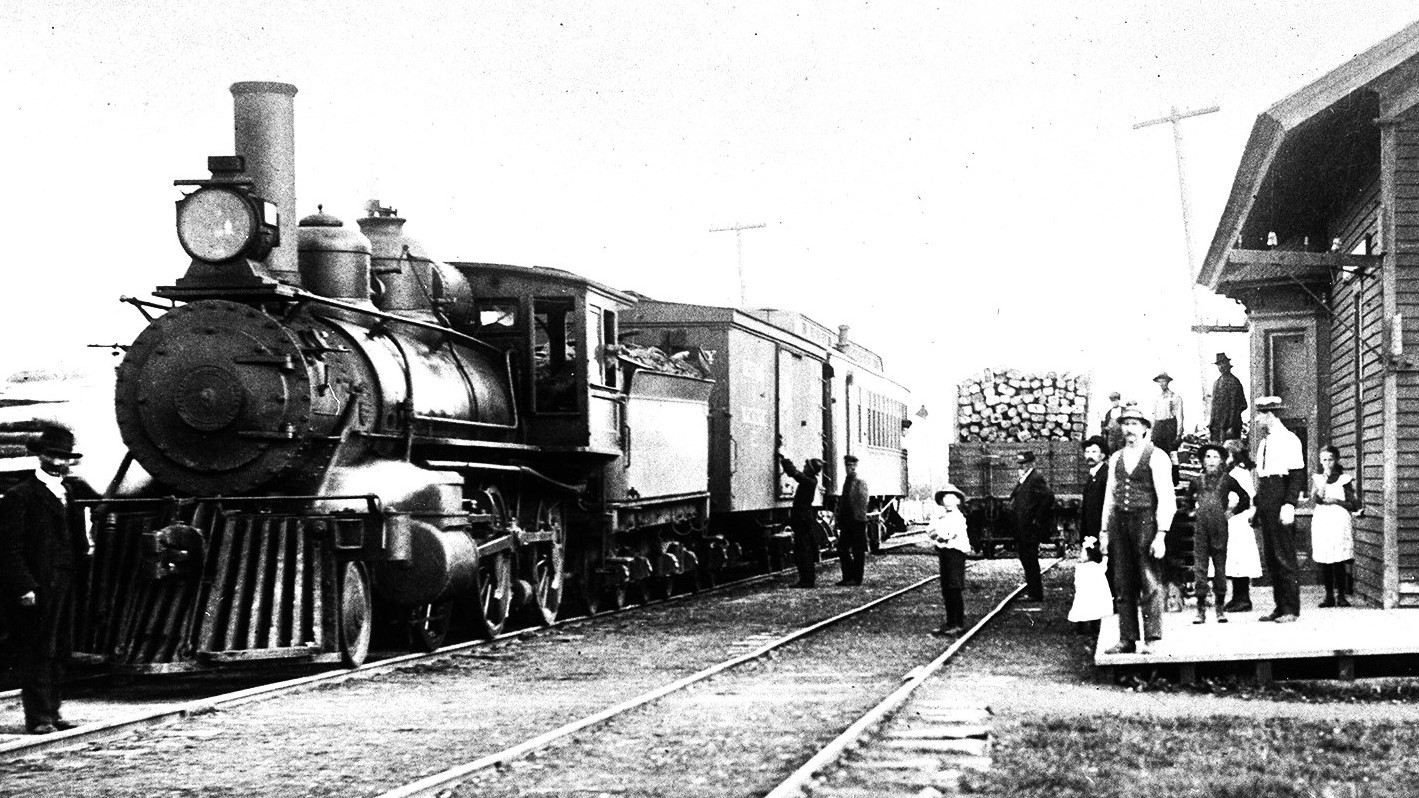
Historic photo of the train station

In the early 1880s, the Detroit, Bay City and Alpena Railroad expanded its railway line through Alcona County. The line was constructed a few miles inland just west of the community of Greenbush. Daniel Bruce, who resided in Greenbush, moved west in early 1886 and settled along the railway line. He built a hotel and livery barn to serve traveling lumbermen in anticipation of the growing lumber industry. Numerous other families settled along the railway, and the new community became known as West Greenbush.

Bruce was very persistent in having a train depot built here. He walked overnight through the snow to arrive in Tawas City in time to convince railroad officials to agree to build the depot, in which he also paid $360 ($12,300 in 2025 dollars) of his own money toward the agreement. A train depot was built soon after and provided a direct link to West Harrisville to the north and Au Sable to the south.

Near West Greenbush, the community of Handy was settled to the north along the railway. Handy also received a train depot and was granted the area's first post office under the name Roy on March 23, 1886. Roy and West Greenbush quickly grew as lumbering communities, and Bruce petitioned the state to open a post office in his own community. He suggested the names Bruceville or Bruce Crossing for the name of the post office. The name Bruceville was rejected, and Bruce Crossing was already the name of another community in Michigan. The new post office was granted under the name Mikado by the assistant postmaster general, who had recently seen The Mikado opera and favored the name. This resulted in the usual designation of a Japanese name for a Michigan community. The community of West Greenbush received a post office and changed its name to Mikado on May 11, 1886. Philip Partridge served as the first postmaster. The surrounding area was also set aside from Greenbush Township and established as Mikado Township that same year. St. Raphael Church was dedicated on August 13, 1895 in Mikado. The church remains in operation and is part of the Roman Catholic Diocese of Gaylord.

The community of Roy failed to develop, and the post office was disestablished on June 23, 1898. The train depot also closed around 1900. Mail service to Roy was now handled by the Mikado post office, although Roy soon after became a ghost town.

=== Village of Mikado ===
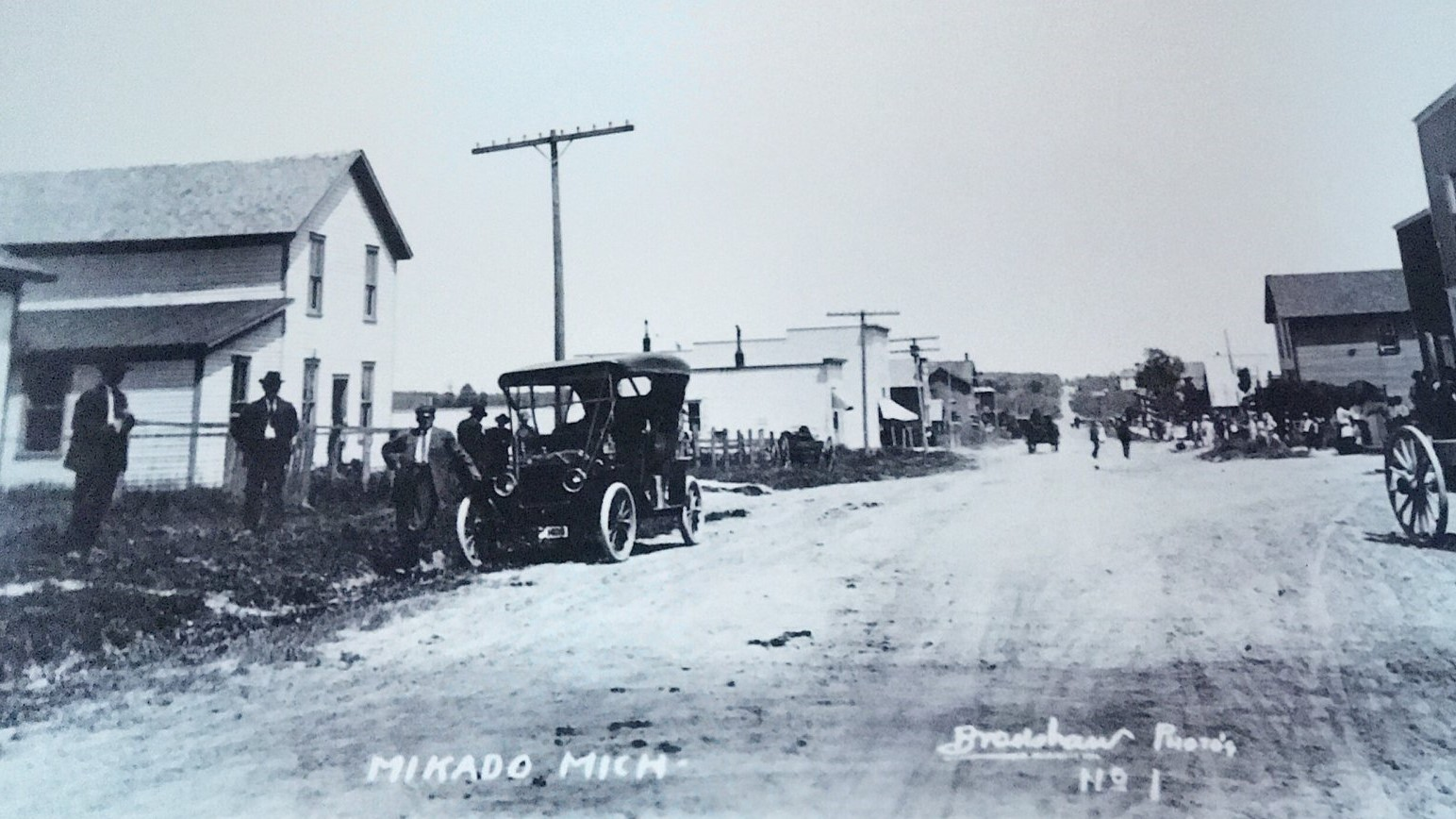
1910 image of the village of Mikado

In 1906, the community officially incorporated as a village. While the lumber industry began declining the area, Mikado transitioned into a farming community. Much of the land surrounding the community was converted into farmland, and the community continued to grow and included a large cedar yard, grain elevator, bank, the post office, sawmill, cheese factory, brick yard, and several grocery stores. In 1907, Mikado received its own school in the form of a log one-room schoolhouse called the Bailey School.

As a newly incorporated municipality, Mikado was listed in the 1910 census and recorded a population of 100. Soon after, the lumber industry ceased operation in the area, and the train depot closed. The depot would later be demolished, and the railway lines were removed. Due to population loss and lack of further development, Mikado did not record its own individual population statistics in the 1920 census, although it was still listed on the census as an incorporated village within Mikado Township. Mikado was not listed at all in the 1930 census or afterward, as at some point around that time, Mikado surrendered its village status and returned to an unincorporated community.

=== Recent history ===
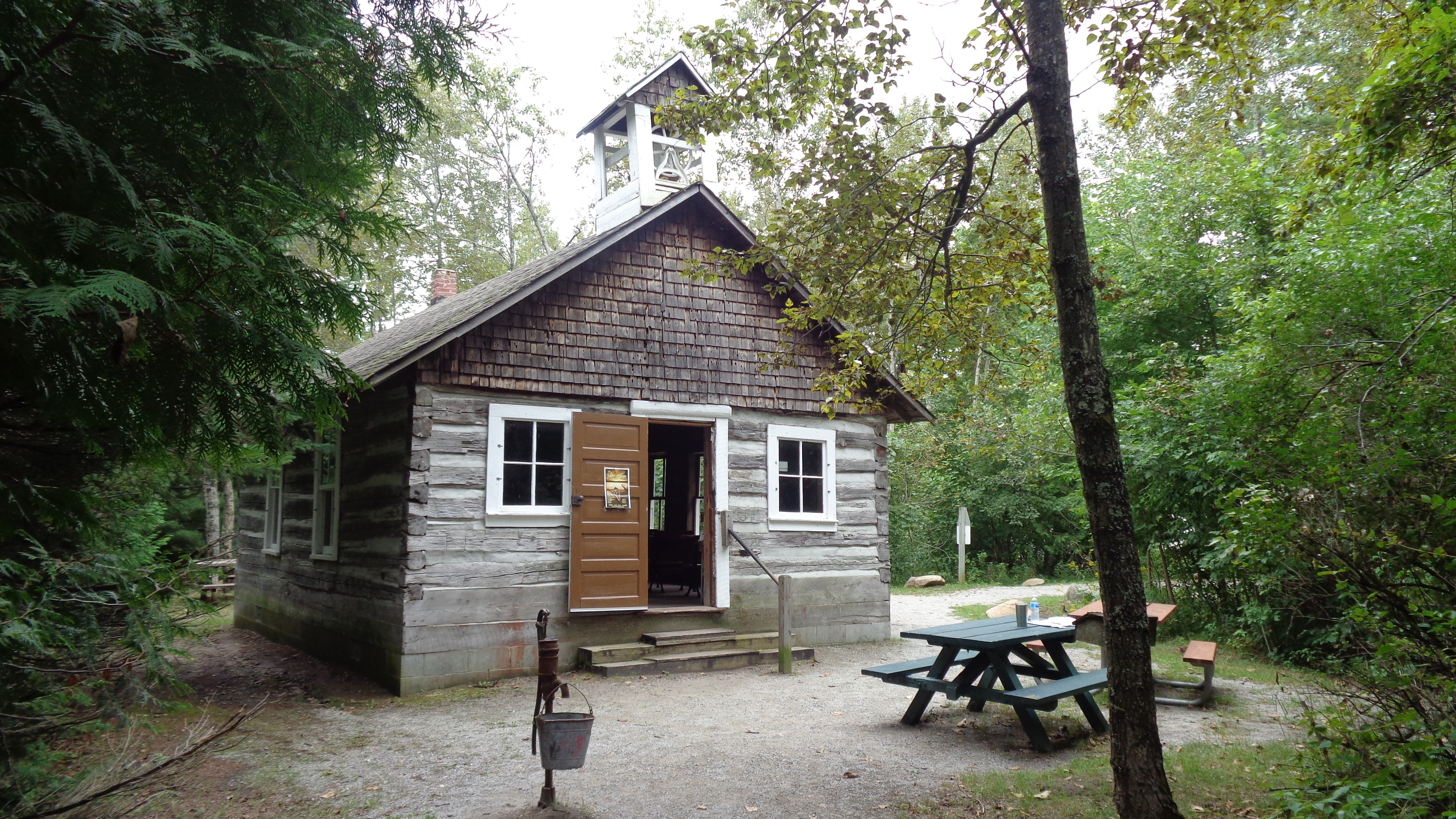
The former Bailey School, originally located in Mikado, was moved and is now part of Sturgeon Point State Park

Mikado benefited from the original U.S. Route 23 (US 23), which ran directly through Mikado beginning in late-1926 as part of a more inland route running from Standish to Mackinaw City. In 1932, US 23 was realigned to a more scenic route along the shores of Lake Huron, where it would instead pass through the community of Greenbush to the east. The roadway through Mikado was then redesignated as state highway M-171, which served as a bypass route of US 23 from Oscoda to Spruce. By early 1961, M-171 was decommissioned entirely. In October 1970, the same roadway through Mikado was commissioned as one of the state's first county-designated highways when it was designated as F-41, which follows the same 31.8-mile (51.2 km) route of the former M-171. While F-41 runs north–south through Mikado, the main east–west roadway through the community was also commissioned as F-30 in 1973. This roadway runs for 21.9 miles (35.2 km) from Greenbush westward to Glennie.

With the closure of the train depot and removal of the railway lines, Mikado is no longer served by any railroad. The Lake State Railway runs to the east parallel to US 23 but has no connection to Mikado.

The Bailey School, which opened in 1907, remained in operation until the end of the 1940–41 school year. At that time, students in Mikado were transferred to Oscoda Area Schools. The building remained unused until the township restored it in 1973. In 1998, the entire structure was disassembled and moved to Sturgeon Point State Park in Haynes Township. It now serves as a historic schoolhouse museum and is listed as an Alcona County Historic Site.

In July 2011, the community of Mikado celebrated its 125th anniversary with a Fourth of July parade, which included an old-fashioned baseball game, music, children's activities, and other festivities.

== Notable people ==
- Edith Bondie, Chippewa basketmaker, born in Mikado
