= Wallace, Michigan =

Wallace is the name of two unincorporated communities in the State of Michigan:

- Wallace, Menominee County, Michigan
- Wallace, Alcona County, Michigan
