= Alcona Dam Pond =

- Location within the state of Michigan Alcona Dam Pond (the United States)
- Location: Curtis Township, Alcona County, Michigan
- Coordinates: 44°33′45″N 83°48′00″W
- Type: Reservoir
- Primary inflows: Au Sable River, Bamfield Creek, Wilbur Creek
- Primary outflows: Au Sable River
- Basin countries: United States
- Surface area: 953 acres (3.9 km^{2})
- Max. depth: 40 ft (12 m)
- Surface elevation: 827 ft (252 m)

Alcona Dam Pond (also Alcona Lake and Alcona Pond) is a lake located in Alcona County in the U.S. state of Michigan.
Outflow is regulated by the Alcona Dam.
