= Sturgeon Point State Park =

Park in Michigan, USA

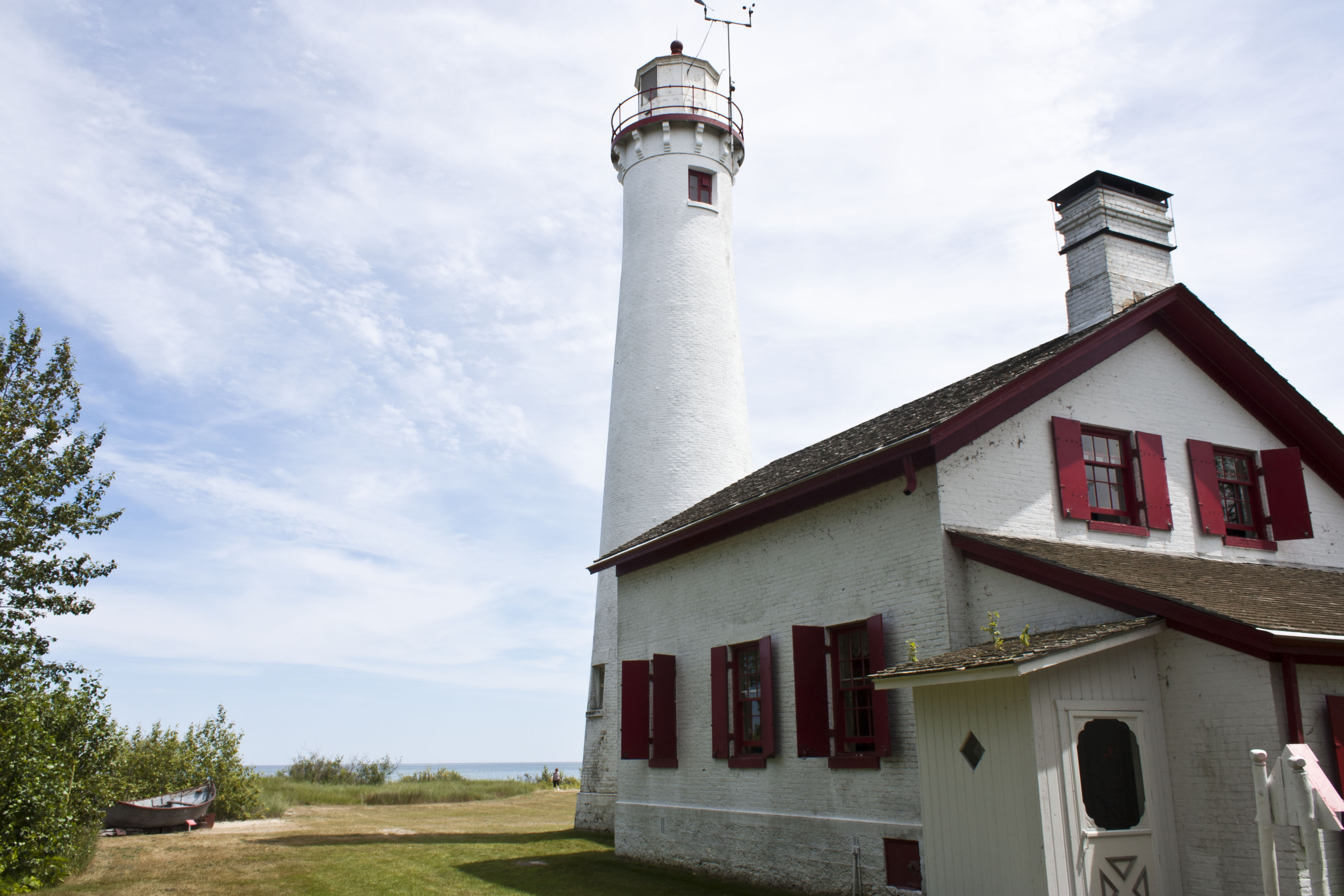
- Sturgeon Point Lighthouse

- Location within Michigan Location within the United States
- Location: Alcona County, Michigan, United States
- Nearest city: Harrisville, Michigan
- Coordinates: 44°42′49″N 83°16′11″W
- Area: 76 acres (31 ha)
- Elevation: 581 feet (177 m)
- Established: 1960
- Administrator: Michigan Department of Natural Resources
- Designation: Michigan state park
- Website: Official website

Sturgeon Point State Park is an undeveloped public recreation area that is home to the historic Sturgeon Point Light. The state park covers 76 acres (31 ha) on the shore of Lake Huron three miles (4.8 km) north of Harrisville in Alcona County, Michigan. In addition to the lighthouse and associated museum, the park features a long and shallow reef that juts into Lake Huron and extends for almost a full mile. The park is used for lighthouse visits, swimming, and viewing various Michigan flora and fauna.
