= Crystal Lake (Michigan) =

Lake in the state of Michigan, United States

Crystal Lake may refer to the following lakes in Michigan:

- Crystal Lake (Benzie County, Michigan), largest at 44°39′N 86°09′W
- Alcona County in Haynes Township near the village of Lincoln at 44°41′24″N 83°23′24″W
- Calhoun County in Fredonia Township near Marshall at 42°14′25″N 84°58′55″W
- Dickinson County in Iron Mountain at 45°48′42″N 88°04′41″W
- Rural Dickinson County at 45°56′50″N 87°55′19″W
- Gogebic County on the border with Wisconsin just east of US 45 at 46°09′25″N 89°10′45″W
- Hillsdale County in Somerset Township just north of Somerset Center at 42°03′51″N 84°24′43″W
- Houghton County in the Ottawa National Forest a few miles west of Sidnaw on M-28 at 46°30′09″N 88°45′42″W
- Manistee County in Wellston, Manistee County, Michigan from M-55 Hwy, take Seaman Road south less than 1 mile, lake on west side of Seaman Road (no motor boats are allowed).
- Montcalm County in Crystal Township about 15 mile (24 km) southwest of Alma at 43°15′43″N 84°55′53″W
- Montmorency County in Albert Township a few miles northwest of Lewiston at 44°55′14″N 84°20′52″W
- Newaygo County in Sherman Township midway between Fremont and White Cloud at 43°30′22″N 85°51′54″W
- Oakland County near Pontiac at 42°37′16″N 83°18′14″W
- Oakland County in Holly Township in the Holly State Recreation Area at 42°48′32″N 83°35′12″W
- Oceana County in Hart Township midway between Shelby and Hart, Michigan just east of U.S. Highway 31 at 43°39′08″N 86°22′49″W

== See also ==
- Crystal Lake Township, Michigan
- List of lakes in Michigan
