= Edith Bondie =

Chippewa Basketmaker

- Born: 1918; Michigan
- Died: 2005; Hubbard Lake
- Occupations: Basket weaver, artist

Edith Bondie (1918-2005) was a basketmaker whose work is in the Smithsonian Institution, the Eiteljorg Museum of American Indians and Western Art, and the Besser Museum for Northeast Michigan.

Bondie was a Chippewa Indian born in 1918 in Mikado, Michigan. Her mother was also a basketmaker. For her baskets, Bondie typically used black ash from around her home. Bondie participated in the 1972 Alpena Fall Harvest Festival held at the in Besser Museum for Northeast Michigan. In 1985, Bondie won the Michigan Heritage Award for her basketweaving. In 1989, Bondie joined Native American artists Michele Gauthier and Sally Thielen for an art exhibition in St. Petersburg. She is featured in Pat Kirkham's 2000 book, Women Designers in the USA, 1900-2000: Diversity and Difference.

In 2005, Bondie died at Hubbard Lake, Michigan. In May 2022, Bondie's work was acquired by the Smithsonian American Art Museum for their exhibit "This Present Moment: Crafting a Better World".
