= Greenbush, Michigan =

- Unincorporated community
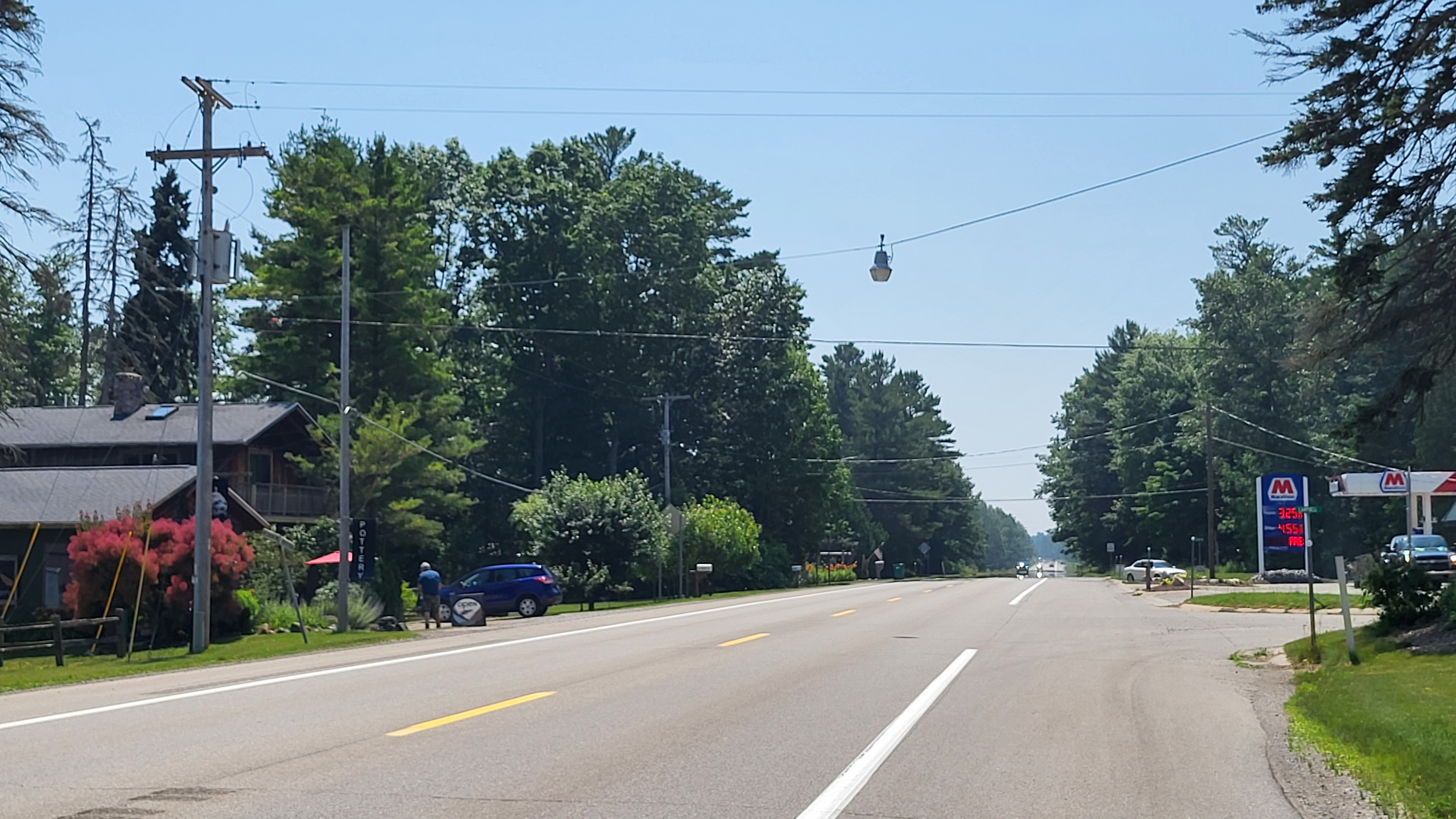
- Looking south along U.S. Highway 23

- Location within the state of Michigan Location within the United States
- Coordinates: 44°35′16″N 83°18′59″W
- Country: United States
- State: Michigan
- County: Alcona
- Township: Greenbush
- Settled: 1848
- Elevation: 610 ft (190 m)
- Time zone: UTC-5 (Eastern (EST))
  - Summer (DST): UTC-4 (EDT)
- ZIP code(s): 48738
- Area code: 989
- GNIS feature ID: 627340

Greenbush is an unincorporated community in Alcona County in the U.S. state of Michigan. The community is located within Greenbush Township along U.S. Highway 23 (US 23) on the shores of Lake Huron.

As an unincorporated community, Greenbush has no legally defined boundaries or population statistics of its own but does have its own post office using the 48738 ZIP Code.

== Geography ==
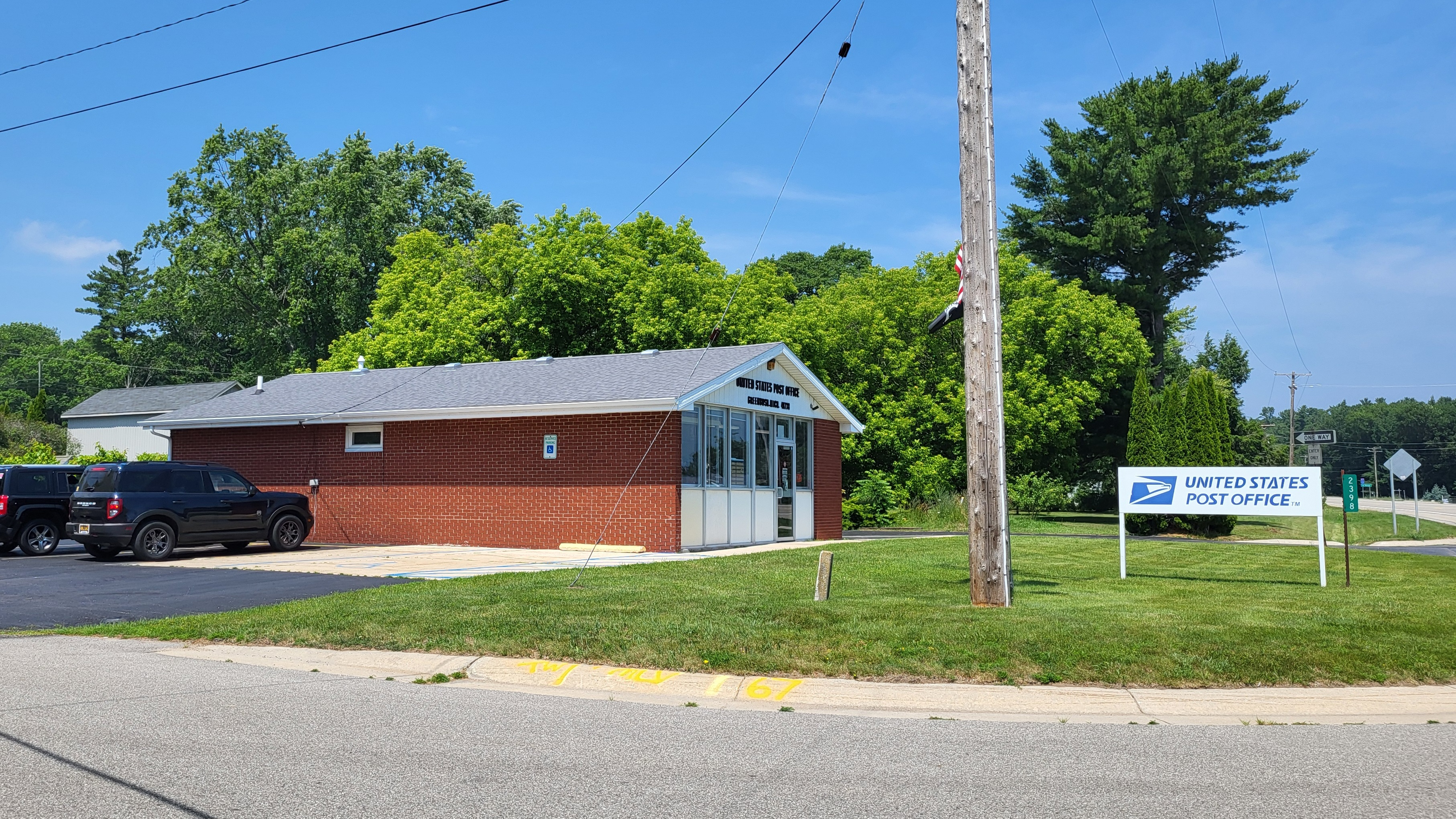
U.S. Post Office in Greenbush

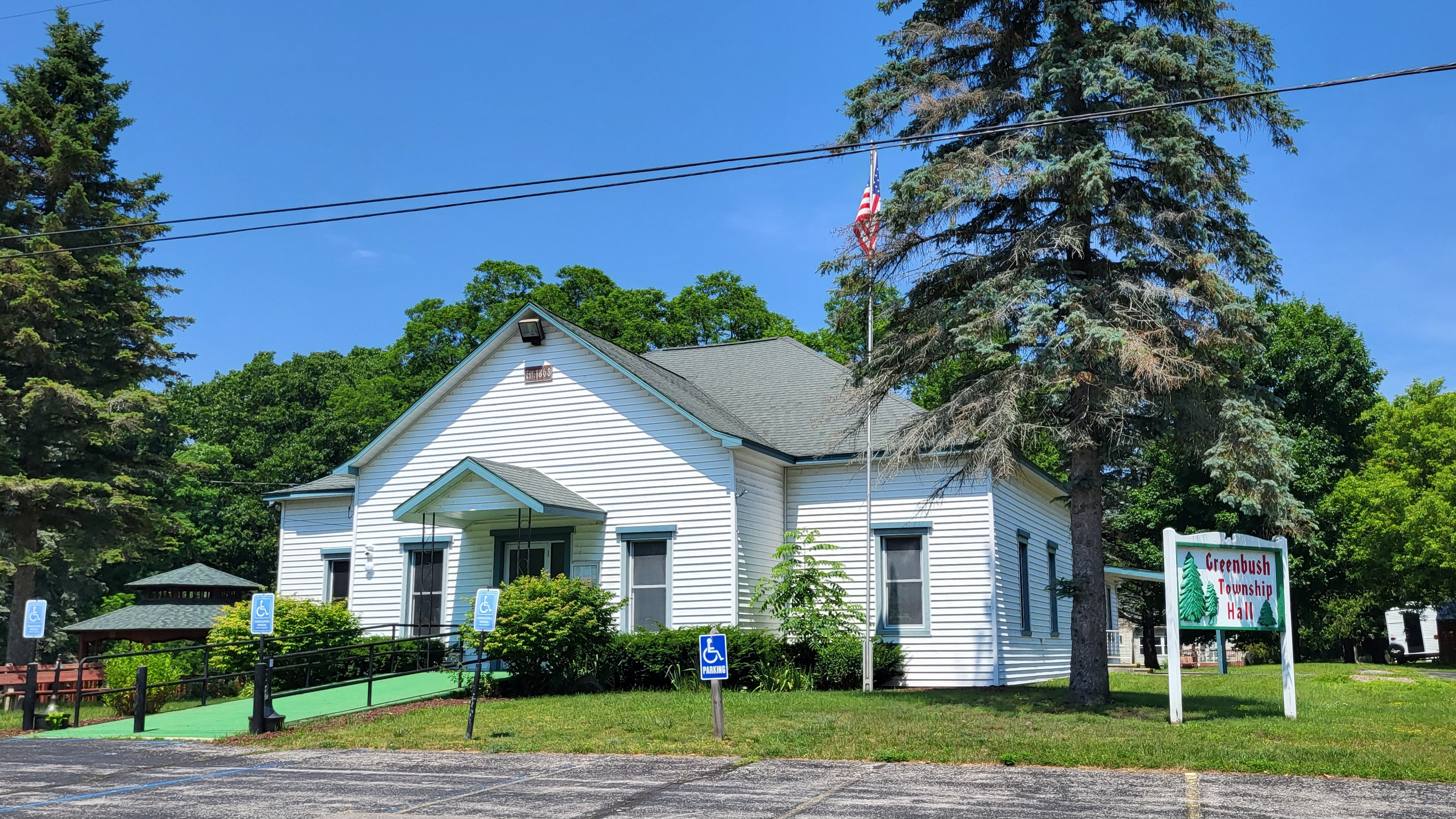
Greenbush Township Hall in Greenbush

Greenbush is a small lakefront community located in southeastern Alcona County in the Northern Michigan region. It is located within Greenbush Township along the shores of Lake Huron. The community sits at an elevation of 610 feet (190 m) above sea level. The surrounded waters are within the southern portion of the Thunder Bay National Marine Sanctuary, and the portions of the surrounding forest lands are included as part of the Grayling Unit of the Au Sable State Forest. Areas further to the west are included as part of the Huron Shores Area of the Huron National Forest.

US 23 runs north–south directly through the community along the Lake Huron shoreline. County Highway F-30 has its eastern terminus at US 23 in Greenbush, and this road runs about 22 miles (35 km) west to the community of Glennie. A rail line belonging to the Alpena Branch of the Lake State Railway runs through the western portion of Greenbush, although the community does not have any rail passenger services anymore. Other nearby unincorporated communities include Mikado to the west, Gustin and Killmaster to the northwest, Alvin to the southwest, and Springport to the north. The census-designated place of Oscoda is located 10 miles (16 km) to the south. The nearest incorporated municipality is the village of Harrisville about six miles (9.7 km) to the north.

Greenbush contains its own post office using the 48738 ZIP Code, which serves a small area including the eastern portion of Greenbush Township. The post office also serves very small portions of southeast Harrisville Township to the north and Oscoda Township to the south in Iosco County. The Greenbush post office is located in the center of the community on US 23. The Greenbush Township Hall is located in the community on Campbell Street, and the township's volunteer fire department is located across the street. Greenbush is served by Oscoda Area Schools to the south in Au Sable Township in Iosco County.

== History ==
The area was first settled as early as 1848, when Crosier Davidson of Detroit moved here and built a fishery and cooperage along the shores of Lake Huron. At the time, it became one of the county's first settlements, and the area was referred to as the Sliding Banks of the Au Sable River. Alcona County was only organized eight years earlier and was being administered by Michilimackinac County to the north. At the time, the settlement was part of Harrisville Township, which occupied the entirety of Alcona County. The area contained numerous unexplored pine resources, and lumber companies surveyed the area in order to purchase inexpensive government land for development.

=== Lumbering community ===
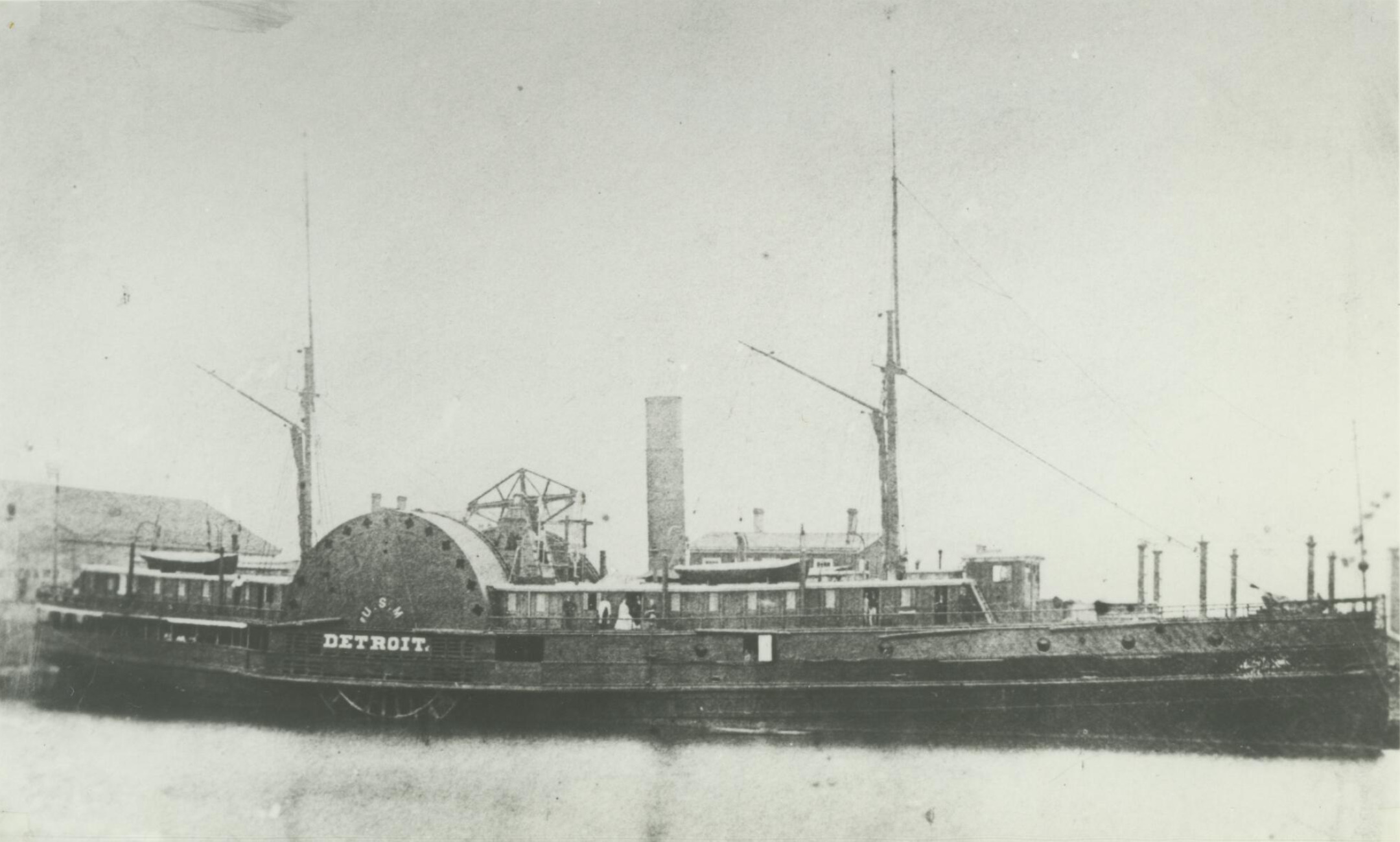
The Detroit was a steamship that sank along the shores of Greenbush in 1872.

The Morris & McDougal lumbering firm from New York was the first to purchase land in the area in 1854, and they established lumber operations by 1862. Because of their presence, the growing community became known as McDougal's Landing. In 1867, William Conklin, also from New York, established an even larger lumber company and built the community's first sawmill. Conklin also built a very large stable that was able to accommodate his 60 horses. At the behest of one of his employees, the community's name was changed to Greenbush after Greenbush in Rensselaer County, New York. In 1868, the southernmost five survey townships of Alcona County became part of a newly established township that was also named Greenbush Township. Greenbush was the only settlement in the township, and it received a post office on May 16, 1870. James Burton served as the first postmaster. It was the county's third post office after Harrisville (1857) and Alcona (1867). Greenbush Township was very sparsely populated at the time and only recorded a population of 86 in the 1870 census.

The large wooden steamship Detroit, which was built in 1859, ran aground in Greenbush during a storm on September 29, 1872. A few weeks later, it was lifted by chains in order to free it, but it broke in half and sank. The ship was declared a total loss, and its wreckage remained in place in 10 feet (3.0 m) of water.

The community of Greenbush appeared on one of the county's earliest published maps in 1873. In 1879, Greenbush was threatened by a forest fire caused by unseasonably dry weather. Harrisville to the north suffered more fire damage, while Greenbush's damage amounted to burned farmland and a stockpile of dry lumber before rainfall put out the fires. That same year, a new township hall was built in Greenbush. Although expanded and remodeled over the years, this building continues to serve as the township hall. In the 1880s, the Detroit, Bay City and Alpena Railroad began building railway lines through Alcona County. Greenbush received a train depot and was an important stop between Harrisville and Oscoda. In 1886, Greenbush resident Daniel Bruce moved west along another rail line, and he settled the new community of West Greenbush. When this community received a train depot that same year, more residents moved westward, and this community eventually became known as Mikado. In 1885, Greenbush received telephone service, and electricity was first provided by hydroelectric dams along the Au Sable River in 1917.

In 1904, Greenbush received its first church building, although the schoolhouse had previously held church services. The community had little money to build their own church, so they purchased an unused schoolhouse in Black River, disassembled the structure, and had it delivered in pieces by horseback. The structure was reassembled in Greenbush, and it began operating as a Methodist church. The church operated under several other denominations before it eventually became vacant for some time.

=== Greenbush School ===
Greenbush School
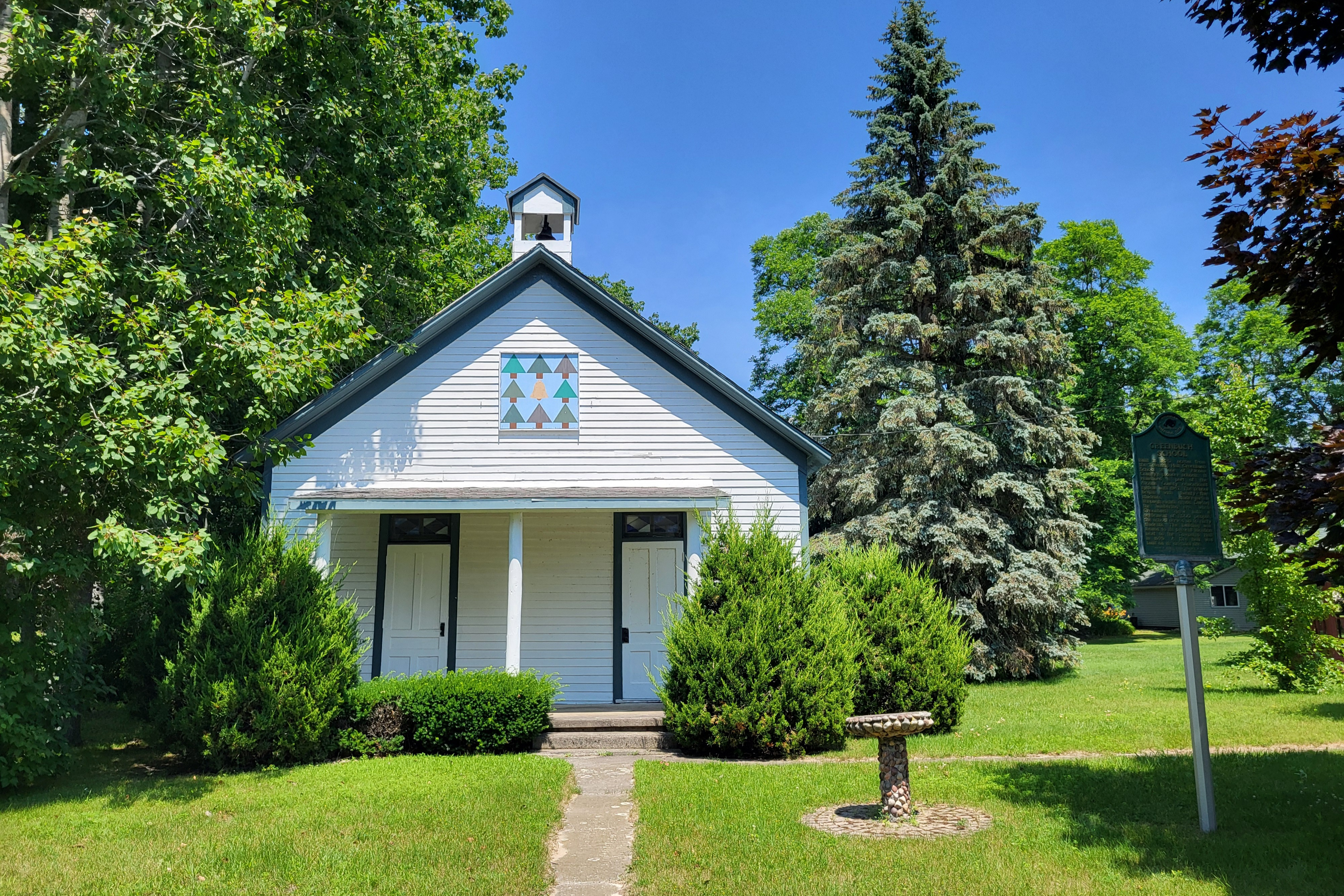
- Interactive map of Greenbush School
- 44°35′10″N 83°19′12″W
- Location: 5036 Campbell Street; Greenbush, MI 48738

History
- Built: 1870

Michigan State Historic Site
- Designated: August 3, 1979

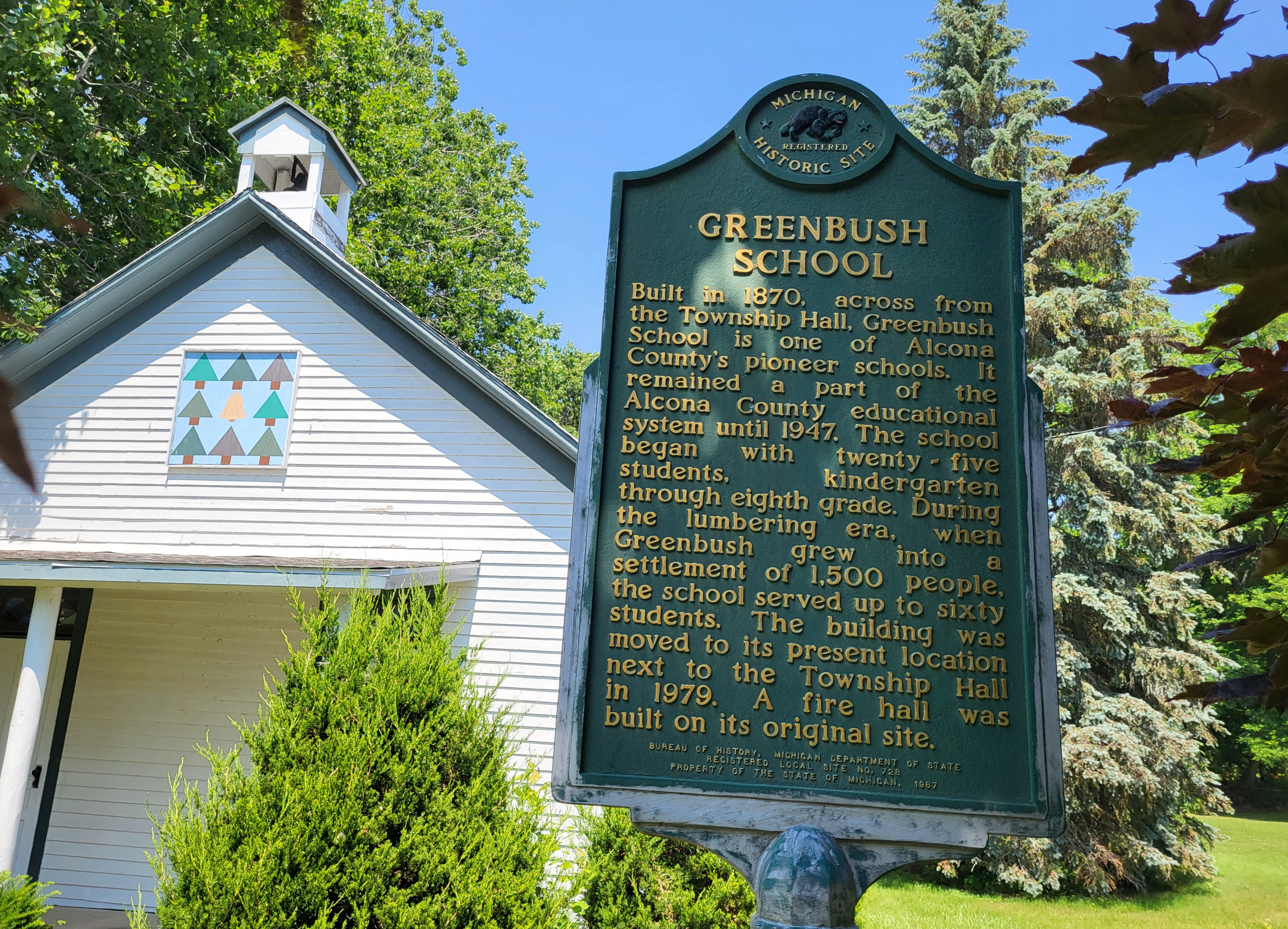
Greenbush School state historic marker

With the growing lumber population, the community of Greenbush grew very quickly to around 1,500 lumbermen and their families. A new school was needed, and the Greenbush School was built in 1870. The building was a simple one-room schoolhouse, which was common throughout rural areas in the state during the time. It was one of the county's first schools, and it served 25 students in its first year. At its height, it could serve up to 60 students. The Greenbush School remained in operation until 1947. Students in the area were then consolidated into Oscoda Area Schools to the south in Au Sable Township in Iosco County.

After its closure, the building remained vacant. In 1979, the township moved the structure just across the street in order to use the original property for the construction of a new fire station. The Greenbush School building remains in this location at 5036 Campbell Street next door to the township hall just west of State Street. The structure currently serves as the Greenbush Historical Society Museum and is the oldest remaining schoolhouse building in the county. It was dedicated as a Michigan State Historic Site on August 3, 1979. In 1987, the Michigan Department of State erected a historical marker on the site right in front of the building.

=== Recent history ===
After the turn of the century, the lumber industry began declining in the area, and Greenbush transitioned primarily into a farming community. In 1910, many plots of farm and lakefront land were purchased by James Bell and sold at low prices in order to facilitate a new tourism industry. He became a prominent landowner and even changed the name of the community to Perfection. The post office adopted this name on May 18, 1917. This name did not last, and it was soon changed back to Greenbush in 1921. During this time, gravel mining became the primary industry, as the Federal Land and Gravel Company began mining operations here in 1912. The area did become a popular tourist destination, and the Greenbush Inn opened in 1925. The hotel originally only had three guest rooms, but due to increasing demand, the structure grew quickly within the same year to include 17 rooms, a large lounge, and a dining area capable of holding 140 people, as well as electricity and hot running water. The hotel remained in operation until it burned down on May 19, 1968.

In 1926, US 23 was commissioned. The original route saw US 23 running a more inland route through Alcona County, but the route was changed to run along the Lake Huron shoreline in 1932. This allowed Greenbush to benefit by having US 23 run directly through the community. This route continues to be the main roadway through Greenbush, where it is also known as the Huron Shores Heritage Route. The main roadway heading west from the community was designated as County Hhighway F-30 in 1973. This road, known locally as East Mikado Road, runs for 22 miles (35 km) from US 23 through Mikado to the community of Glennie. The railway line continues to run along the west side of Greenbush, although there is no longer a train depot or passenger rail service in the community. The single line is now operated by Lake State Railway and provides daily freight service to Alpena. The railway built a transload terminal here in 2020, and the facility has three tracks to serve passing lumber trains.

In 1938, the original church building, which was previously vacant, reopened as the Greenbush Union Church under the Baptists denomination. The church building itself was later expanded to include a school and gymnasium and was renamed as the Greenbush Community Baptist Church. The church is located at 2430 South State Street and remains in operation. In 1953, the township's fire department was established and built its fire station in Greenbush. In 1979, the current fire station was built on the original site of the Greenbush School, in which the school building was moved across the street. Opening in the 1970s, the Greenbush Golf Course is a nine-hole course located along the shores of Lake Huron in the northern portion of the community. This course is part of the US 23 Sunrise Coast Pure Michigan Byway heritage route.

In 2014, the Thunder Bay National Marine Sanctuary expanded its boundaries to the south to include Alcona County. The steamship Detroit, which sank near Greenbush in 1872, was now included in the sanctuary. It is the southernmost shipwreck in the sanctuary, and its wreckage can still be seen in 10 feet (3.0 m) of water just off the coast. In 2018, Greenbush celebrated its sesquicentennial, which involved a parade, craft fair, children's activities, tours of the Greenbush School, and a barbeque at the fire station, which was also celebrating its 50th anniversary.
