= Fairview Area School District =

School district in Michigan

Location
- 1879 E Miller Rd; Fairview, Michigan 48621 United States

District information
- Type: Public
- Grades: PK-12
- Superintendent: Sarah Taylor
- Schools: 1
- Budget: $3,499,000 (2019-20)
- NCES District ID: 2610560

Students and staff
- Students: 302 (2021-22)
- Teachers: 15.80 (2021-22)
- Student–teacher ratio: 19.11 (2021-22)
- Athletic conference: North Star League
- District mascot: Eagles
- Colors: Maroon & Gold

Other information
- Website: www.fask12.org

Fairview Area School District is a small rural public school district in the U.S. state of Michigan serving pre-kindergarten through twelfth grade, and draws its approximately 300 students from northeastern Oscoda and western Alcona counties. The district has one school, the Fairview School, located in Fairview.
