= M-65 (Michigan highway) =

State highway in Michigan, United States

M-65
- M-65 highlighted in red

Route information
- Maintained by MDOT
- Length: 103.176 mi (166.046 km)
- Existed: 1930–present
- Tourist routes: River Road National Scenic Byway

Major junctions
- South end: US 23 near Omer
- M-55 near Whittemore; M-72 near Curran; M-32 near Lachine
- North end: US 23 near Rogers City

Location
- Country: United States
- State: Michigan
- Counties: Arenac, Iosco, Alcona, Alpena, Presque Isle

Highway system
- Michigan State Trunkline Highway System; Interstate; US; State; Byways
← M-64	→ M-66

M-65 is a 103.176-mile-long (166.046 km) state trunkline highway in the US state of Michigan. The highway runs between termini on US Highway 23 (US 23) near Omer and Rogers City in the northeastern Lower Peninsula of the state. M-65 runs inland through several small communities in the region, passing through forests and fields along its course. M-65 crosses several watercourses, including the Au Sable River where it runs along the River Road National Scenic Byway. The region also includes the Huron National Forest and the Mackinaw State Forest areas.

The original M-65 was created by 1919 on a discontinuous series of roads between the Ohio state line and Flint; the two sections were later joined together before the highway was replaced by US 23 in 1926. The current M-65 was created in 1930 in Iosco County. When US 23 near Omer was moved in 1932, M-65 was extended southward to encompass a roadway formerly part of US 23. A second segment in Alpena County was added to M-65 later in the 1930s. A second extension at the end of that decade added another former US 23 segment to the highway. The two sections of M-65 were connected in the late 1940s, and the highway was completely paved by the early 1960s. The National Forest Scenic Byway and National Scenic Byway designations were added in 1988 and 2005 respectively.

== Route description ==
M-65 begins at an intersection with US 23 (Huron Road) near the town of Omer. The highway runs north along Hale Road through a mixed forest and agricultural area inland of the Saginaw Bay in Arenac County. As the road passes through the community of Twining, it crosses a branch of the Lake State Railway. South of Whittemore, the trunkline crosses a tributary of the Au Gres River. M-65 follows Bullock Street through Whittemore, running near the Whittemore Speedway in town. North of town, the highway crosses the main channel of the Au Gres River before it intersects M-55 in a rural area of Iosco County about 15 miles (24 km) west of Tawas City. From there, the road continues due north through fields until reaching the edge of Huron National Forest in the northern part of the county.

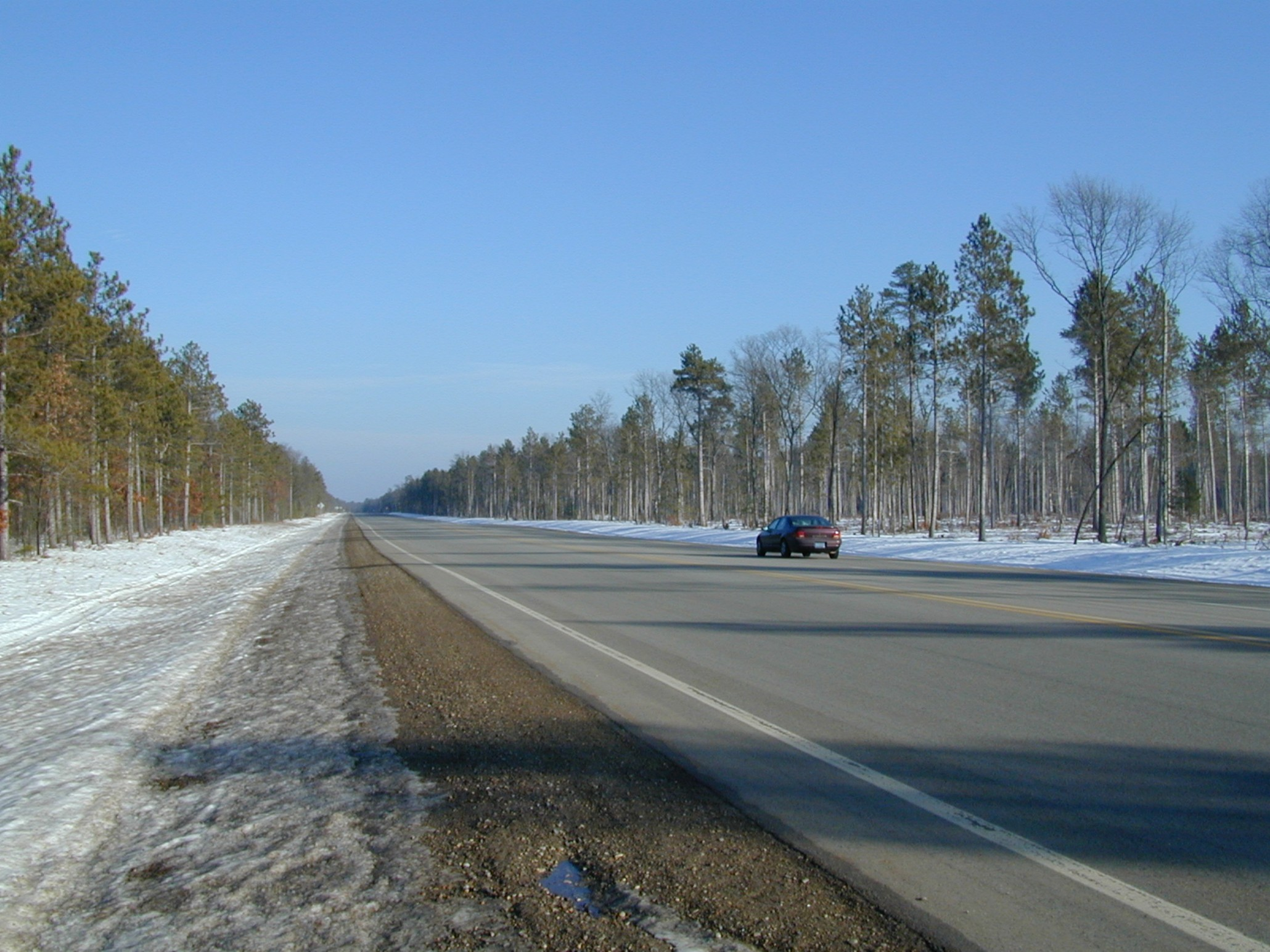
Looking east in the Huron National Forest

Just north of the community of Hale the road enters the Huron National Forest near Loon Lake. The trunkline takes a turn to the east as it passes along the Au Sable River. The River Road National Scenic Byway starts on M-65 at Rollways Road, and the highway generally follows the river as it passes by a former logging community which is commemorated by Lumberman's Monument. At the intersection with River Road, M-65 turns north to cross the Au Sable, and the byway designation continues east along River Road to follow the river to Oscoda. The M-65 bridge over the Au Sable is just downstream of the Five Channels Dam, crossing high above the water below. The highway turns northwesterly through forest land to cross into Alcona County. North of the county line, the trunkline follows Baker and State roads near Vaughn and Hunters lakes. M-65 meets the western terminus of county road F-30 in the community of Glennie. The highway also crosses the South Branch of the Pine River.

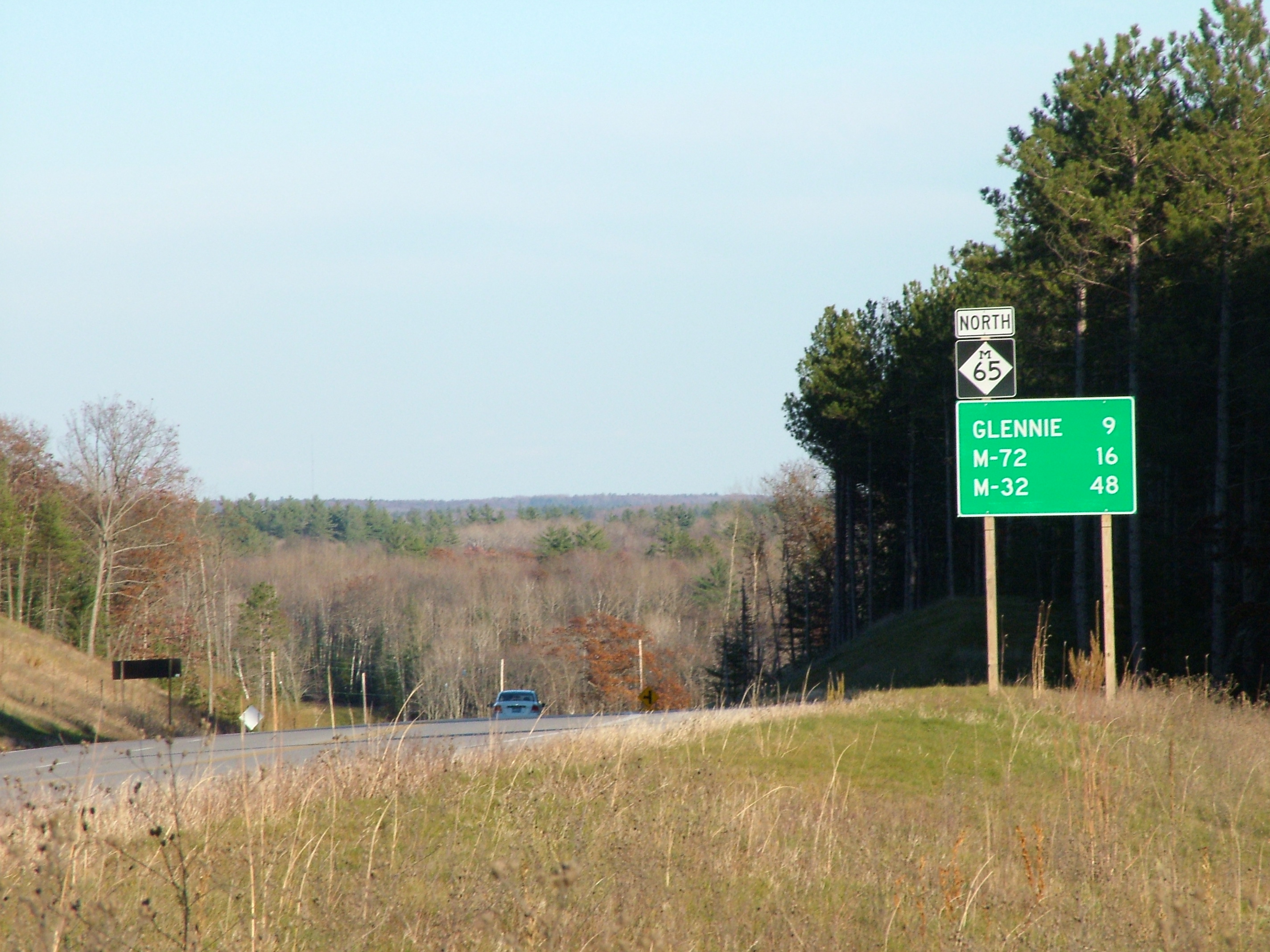
M-65 just north of the Au Sable River

North of Glennie, the highway passes Clear Lake as it continues through rural Alcona County. Near the West Branch of the Pine River, M-65 merges with M-72. The two trunklines run concurrently curving to the northwest past the eastern terminus of county road F-32 into Curran. North of town, they separate as M-72 turns westward and M-65 continues north, exiting the Huron National Forest. The highway jogs along the Alcona–Alpena County line and crosses the Beaver Creek in the process. The trunkline runs to the east of Beaver Lake as it runs north through mixed forest and fields toward the community of Lachine. Southeast of that town, M-65 turns eastward along M-32 for a short distance before turning north into town. North of Lachine, the highway crosses the Thunder Bay River near the community of Long Rapids. As M-65 runs through the northern portion of Alpena County, it runs through the Mackinaw State Forest. The highway passes through the community of Posen in eastern Presque Isle County. The road continues due north to its terminus at an intersection with US 23; the junction is inland from Lake Huron near Big and Little Trout lakes southeast of Rogers City.

M-65 is maintained by the Michigan Department of Transportation (MDOT) like all other state highways. As a part of these responsibilities, the department tracks the volume of traffic using the roads under its jurisdiction. They use a metric called average annual daily traffic (AADT), which is a statistical calculation of the average daily number of vehicles on a segment of roadway. In 2009, MDOT's surveys calculated that the highest volume of traffic along M-65 was 6,699 cars north of the M-55 junction; the highest commercial AADT was 310 trucks along the River Road National Scenic Byway segment north to the F-30 junction in Glennie. The lowest traffic counts were the 947 cars and 107 trucks near the northern terminus in Presque Isle County. The section of M-65 concurrent with M-32 has been listed as a part of the National Highway System, a network of roads important to the country's economy, defense, and mobility.

== History ==
=== Previous routing ===
On July 1, 1919, the M-65 designation was used on two, discontinuous roads in the southern part of the Lower Peninsula. The southern segment ran from the Ohio state line north to the Dundee area in Monroe County; the northern section ran between Ann Arbor and Flint by way of Brighton and Fenton. The gap between the two segments was eliminated by the middle of 1926. When the United States Numbered Highway System was created on November 11, 1926, the original M-65 was redesignated as part of US 23.

=== Current routing ===
In 1930, the first segment of the current routing of M-65 was designated. At the time, the road ran from an intersection with US 23 and M-55 near Whittemore and ran north to Hale. US 23 was moved from its inland routing to follow a shoreline alignment along Saginaw Bay around 1932. The former route through Twining and Whittemore became an extension of M-65 as a part of these changes. By 1936, the highway was lengthened northwards to end in Glennie; a second segment was also added that ran north from the Alcona–Alpena county line to Lachine. Around the end of the decade, US 23's routing was moved in another location to follow the lakeshore; this time the highway was rerouted between Alpena and Rogers City. M-65 was extended northwards from Lachine through Posen to terminate at M-91 downtown Rogers City. By 1945, this northernmost segment downtown was redesignated Business US 23, and M-65 was truncated to its junction with US 23 southeast of town.

In 1947 or early 1948, the Michigan State Highway Department (MSHD) closed the gap between the northern and southern segments of M-65 by adding two "earth" roadways: one between Glennie and M-72 near Curran and a second between Curran and the Alcona–Alpena county line. By the next year, the northern end of the highway near Posen was moved to eliminate several zig-zagging segments of roadway from the routing; M-65 ran due north to terminate at US 23 after the change. In the middle of 1953, the section of M-65/M-72 in Alcona County was straightened and paved. The MSHD realigned M-65 from a series of zig-zagging roads to a single set of curves along the Alcona–Alpena county line in late 1961. At the time this project was completed, all of M-65 was paved.

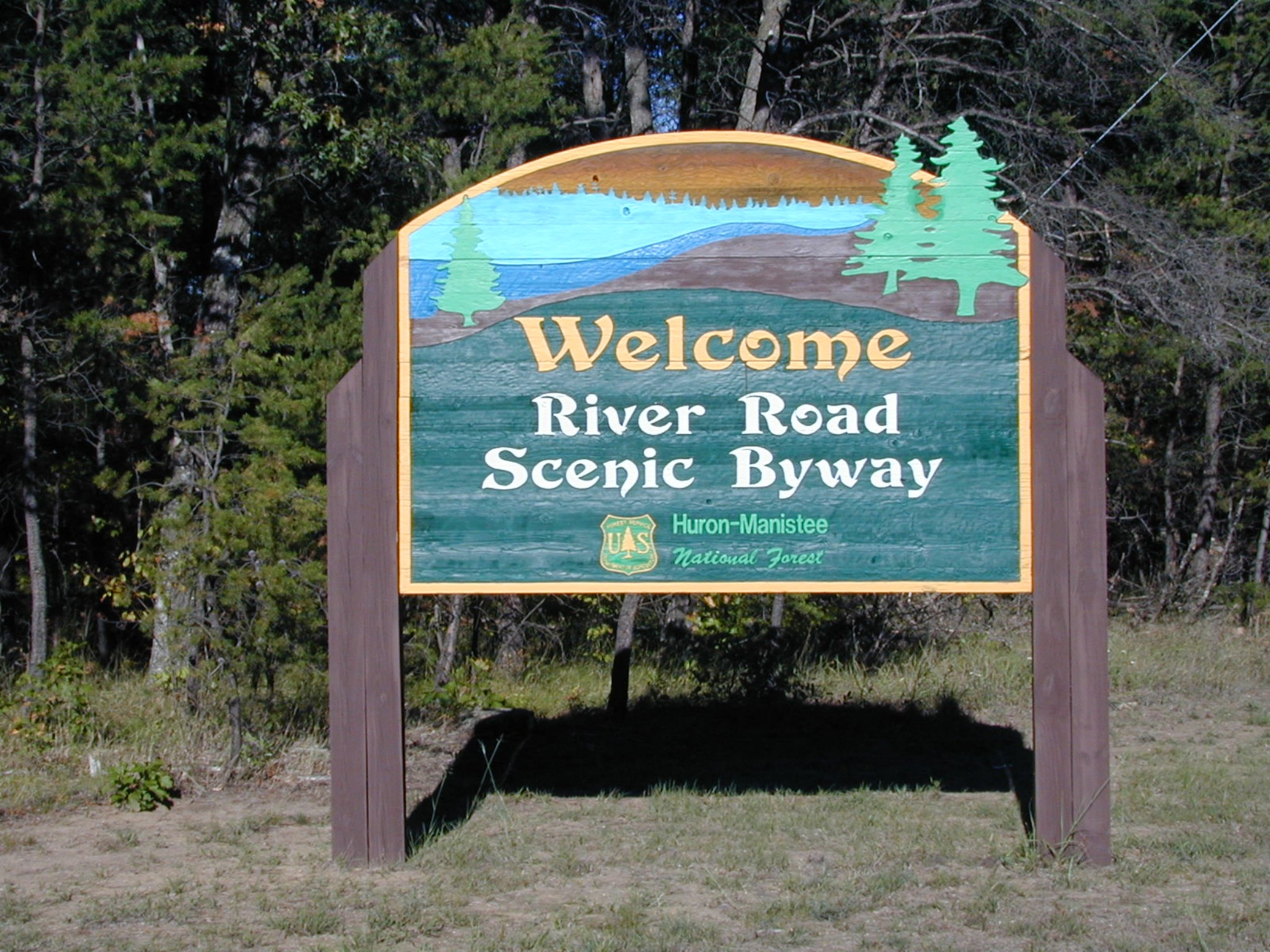
Entrance sign for the River Road National Scenic Byway and the Huron National Forest

On December 20, 1988, the National Forest Service designated the River Road National Forest Scenic Byway along a section of M-65 in Iosco County. A second designation was added on September 22, 2005, when the Federal Highway Administration listed the roadway as the River Road National Scenic Byway.

Beginning in 1999, MDOT spent substantial sums of money over a five-year program to upgrade M-65 and US 23 by refurbishing and replacing bridges and adding more passing lanes. During the same timeframe, the community of Hale embarked on a project to beautify the length of M-65 in town. The project cost $877,929 and installed park benches, new lighting, sidewalks and plantings along the highway. Funding for the venture came from the federal government and MDOT.

In particular, MDOT restored the old truss bridge over the Au Sable River in Iosco County, and then built a new parallel and upgraded bridge next to it. The latter straightened and leveled the roadway, so that it no longer dips deep into the river valley. This change improved the safety of the highway in the area. The new bridge was opened to traffic on October 13, 2004, and the original bridge was left in place for recreational uses. The original structure is a Parker truss bridge with two 120-foot (37 m) spans that was built in 1930. Its total length of 320 feet (98 m) makes it one of the longest of its type in Michigan.

== Major intersections ==
County	Location	mi	km	Destinations	Notes
Arenac	Omer	0.000	0.000	US 23 / LHCT – Standish, Tawas City	Roadway continues from the south as Hale Road
Iosco	Reno Township	15.870	25.540	M-55 – West Branch, Tawas City	
Iosco	Plainfield Township	29.537	47.535	River Road National Scenic Byway east Rollways Road	Western terminus of River Road National Scenic Byway at western end of concurrency
Iosco	Oscoda Township	33.854	54.483	River Road National Scenic Byway east – Oscoda	Eastern end of River Road National Scenic Byway concurrency
Alcona	Glennie	42.805	68.888	F-30 east (Bamfield Road) – Greenbush	Western terminus of F-30
Alcona	Millen Township	49.674	79.943	M-72 east – Harrisville	Southern end of M-72 concurrency
Alcona	Curran	54.893	88.342	F-32 west (Aspen Alley Road) – McKinley	Eastern terminus of F-32
Alcona	Curran	56.681	91.219	M-72 west – Mio, Grayling	Northern end of M-72 concurrency
Alpena	Green Township	82.215	132.312	M-32 west – Atlanta, Gaylord	Western end of M-32 concurrency
Alpena	Green Township	83.826	134.905	M-32 east – Alpena	Eastern end of M-32 concurrency
Presque Isle	Pulawski Township	103.176	166.046	US 23 / LHCT – Rogers City, Cheboygan, Alpena	
1.000 mi = 1.609 km; 1.000 km = 0.621 mi: Concurrency terminus
