= Curtis Township, Michigan =

- Civil township
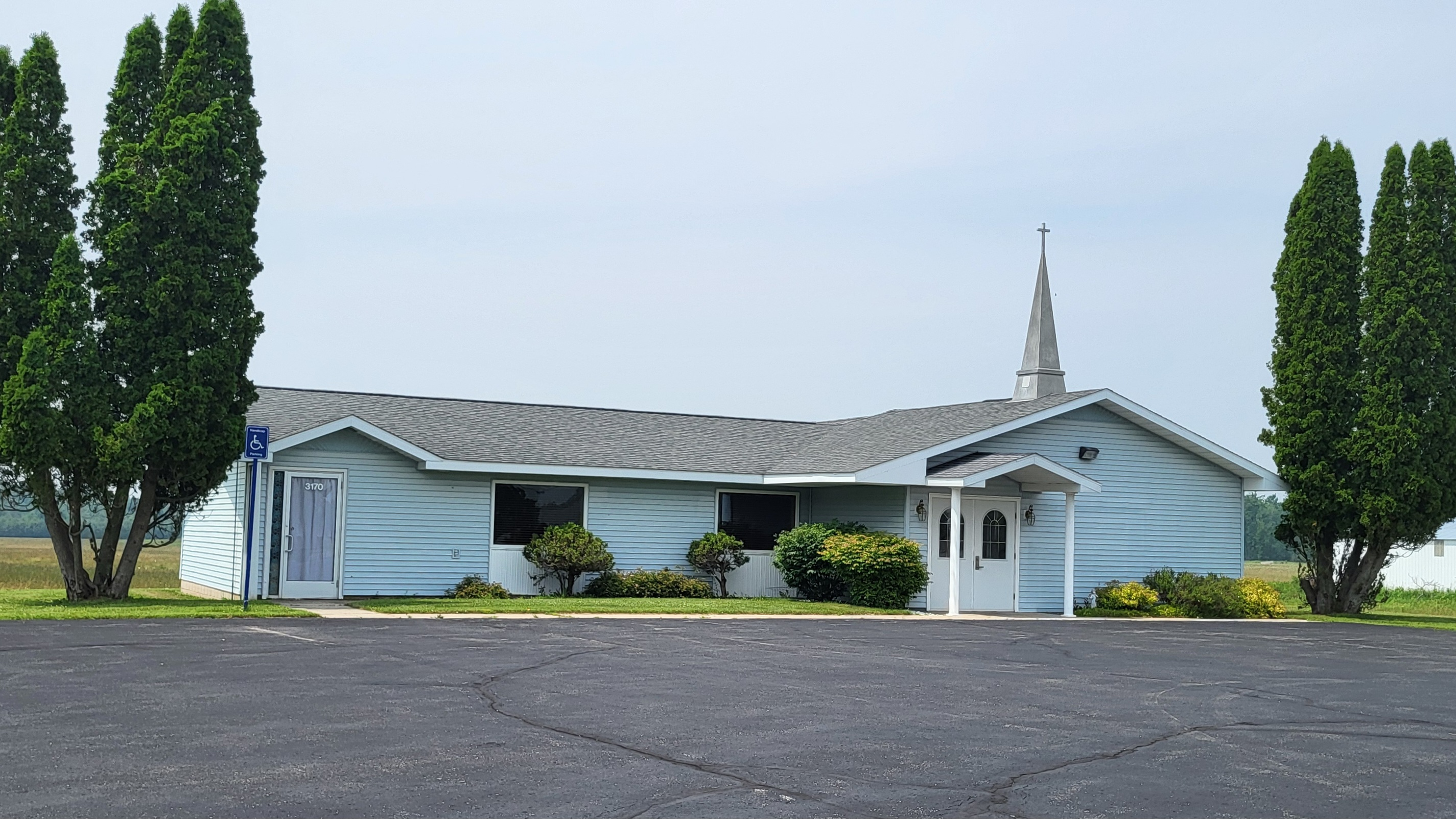
- Glennie United Methodist Church, which also serves as the township hall

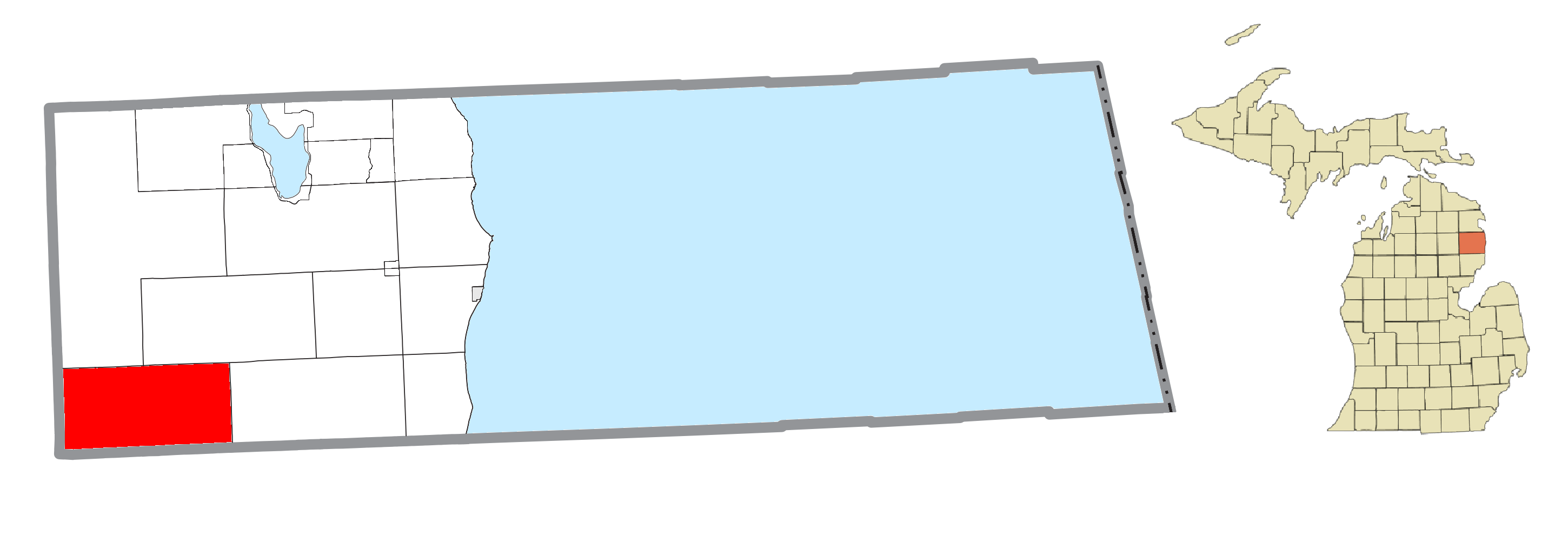
- Location within Alcona County

- Location within the state of Michigan Location within the United States
- Coordinates: 44°33′24″N 83°45′40″W
- Country: United States
- State: Michigan
- County: Alcona
- Organized: 1881

Government
  - Supervisor: Gary Griffith
  - Clerk: Teresa Perkins

Area
  - Total: 70.72 sq mi (183.2 km^{2})
  - Land: 68.39 sq mi (177.1 km^{2})
  - Water: 2.33 sq mi (6.0 km^{2})
- Elevation: 991 ft (302 m)

Population (2020)
  - Total: 1,087
  - Density: 15.89/sq mi (6.137/km^{2})
- Time zone: UTC-5 (EST)
  - Summer (DST): UTC-4 (EDT)
- ZIP code(s): 48737 (Glennie); 48761 (South Branch)
- Area code: 989
- FIPS code: 26-19320
- GNIS feature ID: 1626150
- Website: Official website

Curtis Township is a civil township of Alcona County in the U.S. state of Michigan. The population was 1,087 at the 2020 census.

== Communities ==
- Bamfield is a former unincorporated community that served as a station along the Au Sable and Northwestern Railroad near Bamfield Pond along the Au Sable River. A post office operated in Bamfield from December 11, 1922, until June 30, 1924. The post office closed and the community was deserted after the creation of the Alcona Dam, in which Bamfield Pond was expanded and currently known as Alcona Dam Pond.
- Bryant is an unincorporated community located in the southeast corner of the township at 44°31′30″N 83°39′57″W.
- Cheviers in an unincorporated community located in the center of the township at 44°34′05″N 83°44′13″W.
- Curtisville is an unincorporated community located in the western portion of the township at 44°33′35″N 83°52′02″W. Curtisville was settled in 1881 and named after the newly established Curtis Township. It was named after its first settled E. D. Curtis. A post office opened under the name Curtis and operated briefly from June 14 until August 23, 1881. The post office was reestablished under the name Curtisville and operated from December 29, 1897, until February 15, 1955.
- Glennie is an unincorporated community in the center of the township at the intersection of M-65 and Bamfield Road at 44°33′38″N 83°43′33″W. The community was first known as Glennie Station and began as a stop along the Detroit and Mackinac Railway in 1889. A post office opened on October 5, 1889, under the name Glennie Station and was shortened to Glennie on October 2, 1894. The community was platted much later in 1940. The Glennie post office remains open and uses the 48737 ZIP Code, which serves portions of Curtis Township and several surrounding townships.
- Kurtz is an unincorporated community on the eastern border of the township with Mikado Township at 44°33′40″N 83°38′44″W. The community was named for Hugo Kurtz, and it began as a logging community around 1900. A post office opened briefly from July 31, 1909, until March 31, 1911.
- Wallace is an unincorporated community located just north of Bryant at 44°31′55″N 83°39′56″W.

== History ==
Curtis Township was organized in 1881 and named for its first settler E. D. Curtis.

== Geography ==
According to the U.S. Census Bureau, the township has a total area of 70.72 square miles (183.16 km^{2}), of which 26.41 square miles (68.39 km^{2}) is land and 2.33 square miles (6.03 km^{2}) (3.29%) is water.

=== Major highways ===
- M-65 runs south–north through the center of the township.
- F-30 is a county-designated highway that has is western terminus at M-65 in Glennie.

== Demographics ==
Historical population
Census	Pop.	Note	%±
1960	664		—
1970	718		8.1%
1980	1,082		50.7%
1990	1,128		4.3%
2000	1,378		22.2%
2010	1,236		−10.3%
2020	1,087		−12.1%
Source: Census Bureau. Census 1960- 2000, 2010.

As of the census of 2000, there were 1,378 people, 608 households, and 432 families residing in the township. The population density was 20.2 inhabitants per square mile (7.8/km^{2}). There were 1,605 housing units at an average density of 23.5 units per square mile (9.1 units/km^{2}). The racial makeup of the township was 98.62% White, 0.07% Native American, 0.07% Asian, 0.15% from other races, and 1.09% from two or more races. Hispanic or Latino of any race were 0.65% of the population.

There were 608 households, out of which 19.4% had children under the age of 18 living with them, 60.5% were married couples living together, 6.7% had a female householder with no husband present, and 28.9% were non-families. 24.8% of all households were made up of individuals, and 10.9% had someone living alone who was 65 years of age or older. The average household size was 2.25 and the average family size was 2.66.

In the township the population was spread out, with 19.9% under the age of 18, 3.3% from 18 to 24, 20.1% from 25 to 44, 31.5% from 45 to 64, and 25.3% who were 65 years of age or older. The median age was 50 years. For every 100 females there were 108.2 males. For every 100 females age 18 and over, there were 103.3 males.

The median income for a household in the township was $27,048, and the median income for a family was $30,817. Males had a median income of $26,563 versus $22,778 for females. The per capita income for the township was $15,457. About 11.7% of families and 15.1% of the population were below the poverty line, including 19.3% of those under age 18 and 12.9% of those age 65 or over.

== Education ==
Curtis Township is served by Alcona Community Schools and Oscoda Area Schools
