= Alcona County, Michigan =

County in Michigan, United States

- County
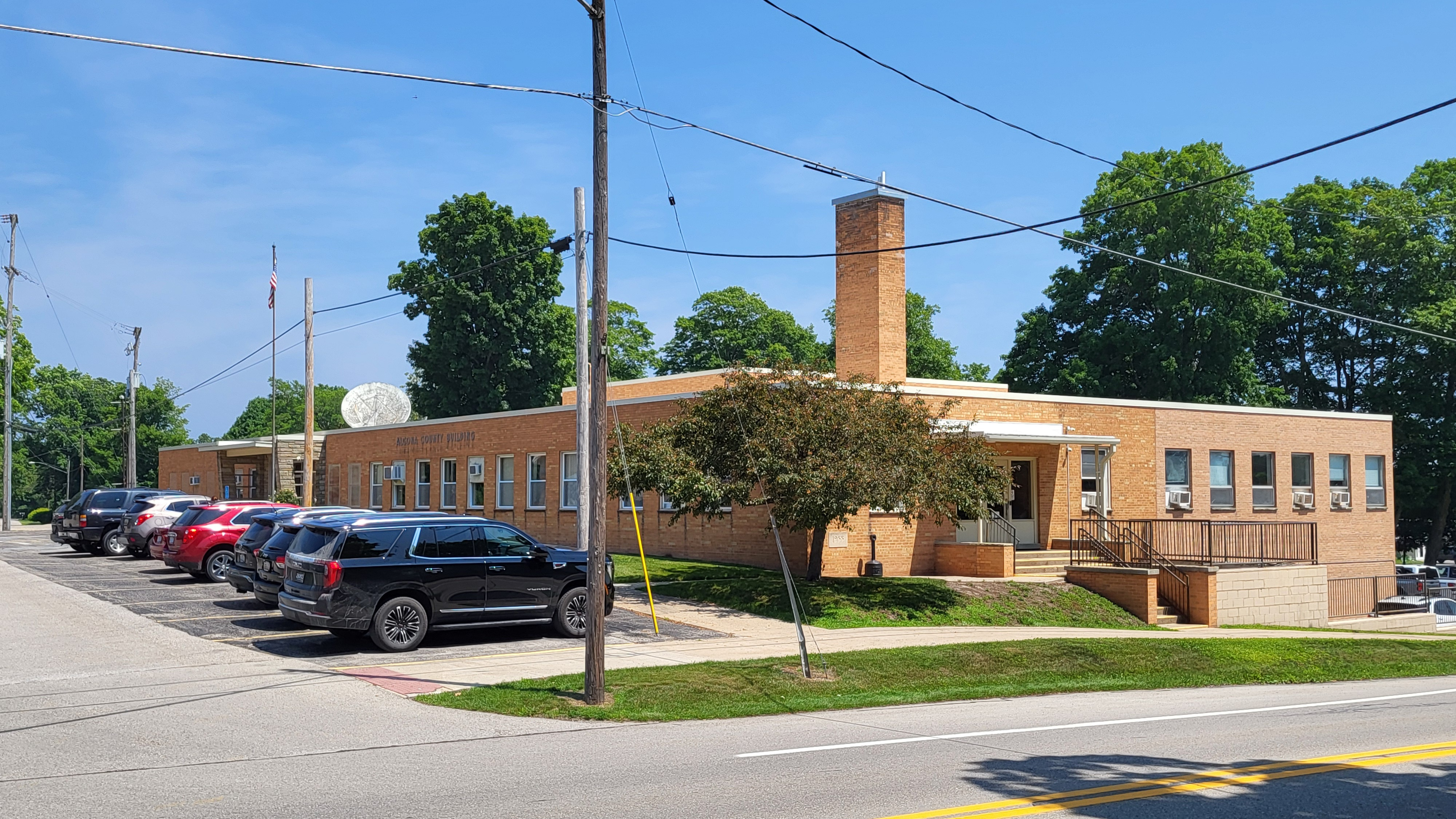
- Alcona County Building in Harrisville

- Flag Logo
- Mottoes: "First of 83"
- Location within the U.S. state of Michigan
- Coordinates: 44°43′N 83°16′W
- Country: United States
- State: Michigan
- Established: 1840
- Organized: 1869
- Seat: Harrisville
- Largest city: Harrisville

Area
  - Total: 1,791 sq mi (4,640 km^{2})
  - Land: 675 sq mi (1,750 km^{2})
  - Water: 1,116 sq mi (2,890 km^{2}) 62.%

Population (2020)
  - Total: 10,167
  - Estimate (2025): 10,556 ▲
  - Density: 15.1/sq mi (5.82/km^{2})
- Time zone: UTC−5 (Eastern)
  - Summer (DST): UTC−4 (EDT)
- Congressional district: 1st
- Website: https://alconacountymi.com/

Alcona County (/ælˈkoʊnə/ al-KOH-nə) is a county of the U.S. state of Michigan. As of the 2020 census, the population was 10,167. Its county seat is Harrisville. Alphabetically it is the first county in Michigan; as its flag states, it is the "First of 83".

== History ==
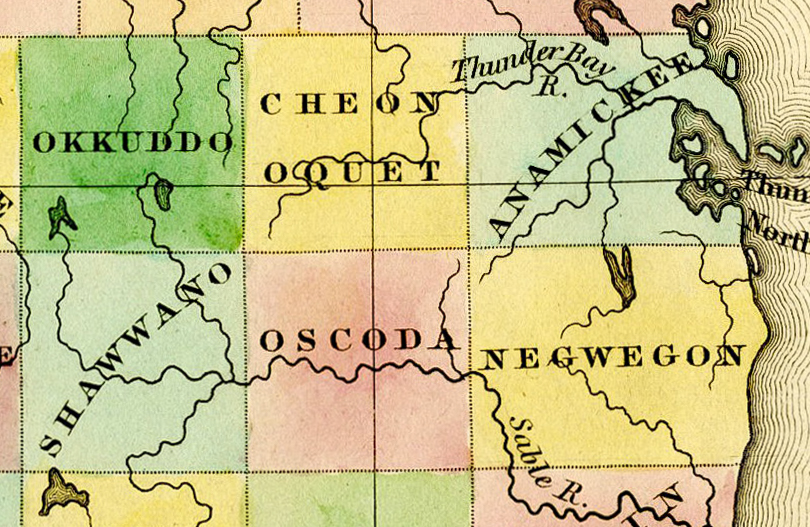
A detail from A New Map of Michigan with its Canals, Roads & Distances (1842) by Henry Schenck Tanner, showing Alcona County as Negwegon, the county's name from 1840 to 1843. Several nearby counties are also shown with names that would later be changed.

The county was created by the state legislature on April 1, 1840. It was at first named Negwegon County, after the name of a well-known Chippewa chief, also known as "Little Wing". He was honored as having been an American ally against the British in the War of 1812.

It was renamed to Alcona County on March 8, 1843, after a neologism created by Henry Rowe Schoolcraft from parts of words from Native American languages, plus Arabic, Greek and Latin. These were amalgamated to mean "fine or excellent plain". He was an influential US Indian agent and geographer.

Alcona County was initially attached to Mackinac County for purposes of revenue, taxation, and judicial matters. The attachment shifted to Cheboygan County in 1853, to Alpena County in 1857, to Iosco County in 1858, and to Alpena County in 1859.

Harrisville Township, then comprising the entire county, was organized in 1860. County government was organized in 1869, becoming effective on May 8, 1869. The county's slogan on its seal (a single gold star on a green field in the shape of Alcona County) is "First of 83," which refers to its place alphabetically among Michigan counties.

In 2007, Alcona County discovered that $1.2 million was missing and was forced to alter its $4 million budget. An investigation revealed that Thomas Katona, who had been the county treasurer for thirteen years, had wired $186,500 of county funds to accounts associated with a well-known Nigerian scam. Katona, who had already lost more than $70,000 of his savings on the scam, ignored repeated warnings from friends and his bank that his so-called investments seemed suspicious.

Katona was sentenced to 9–14 years imprisonment on June 12, 2007, by the 23rd Circuit Court. Judge William Myles said Katona's crimes warranted more severe punishment than called for in state sentencing guidelines, due to the amount of money involved and the number of victims in the case.

== Geography ==
According to the U.S. Census Bureau, the county has a total area of 1,791 square miles (4,640 km^{2}), of which 675 square miles (1,750 km^{2}) is land and 1,116 square miles (2,890 km^{2}) (62%) is water.

The area is part of the Au Sable State Forest, specifically the Grayling FMU (Alcona, Crawford, Oscoda, and northern Iosco counties). The county is considered to be part of Northern Michigan.

Alcona County has a shoreline on Lake Huron. Through Lake Huron, Alcona County has a water boundary with the Canadian province of Ontario. The Au Sable River flows through the southwest of the county.

=== Lakes ===
Lakes in the county include:

- Lake Huron
- Alcona Lake
- Badger Lake
- Bear Lake
- Brownlee Lake
- Byron Lake
- Cedar Lake
- Clear Lake
- Crooked Lake
- Crystal Lake
- Curtis Lake
- Honawan Lake
- Horseshoe Lake
- Hubbard Lake, one of the state's twenty largest inland lakes.
- Hunter Lake
- Indian Lake
- Jenkins lake
- Jewell Lake
- Lost Lake
- North Hoist Lake
- North Lake
- O'Brien Lake
- Poplar Lake
- Reid Lake
- South Hoist Lake
- Tompson Lake

=== Adjacent counties ===
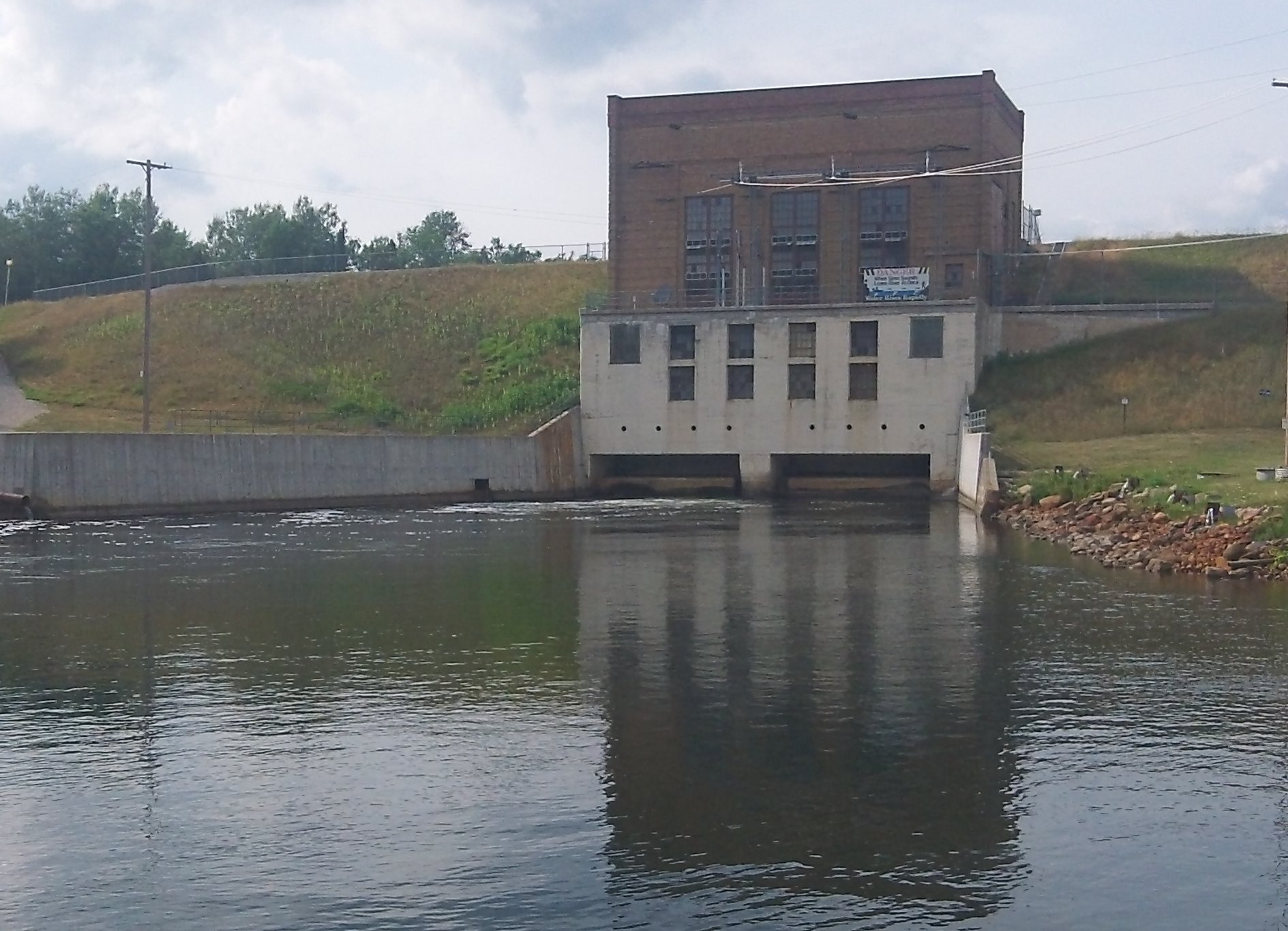
- Alcona Dam on the Au Sable River in Curtis Township.
  Alpena County - north
- Iosco County - south
- Ogemaw County - southwest
- Oscoda County - west
- Montmorency County - northwest

=== National protected area ===
- Huron National Forest (part)

== Communities ==
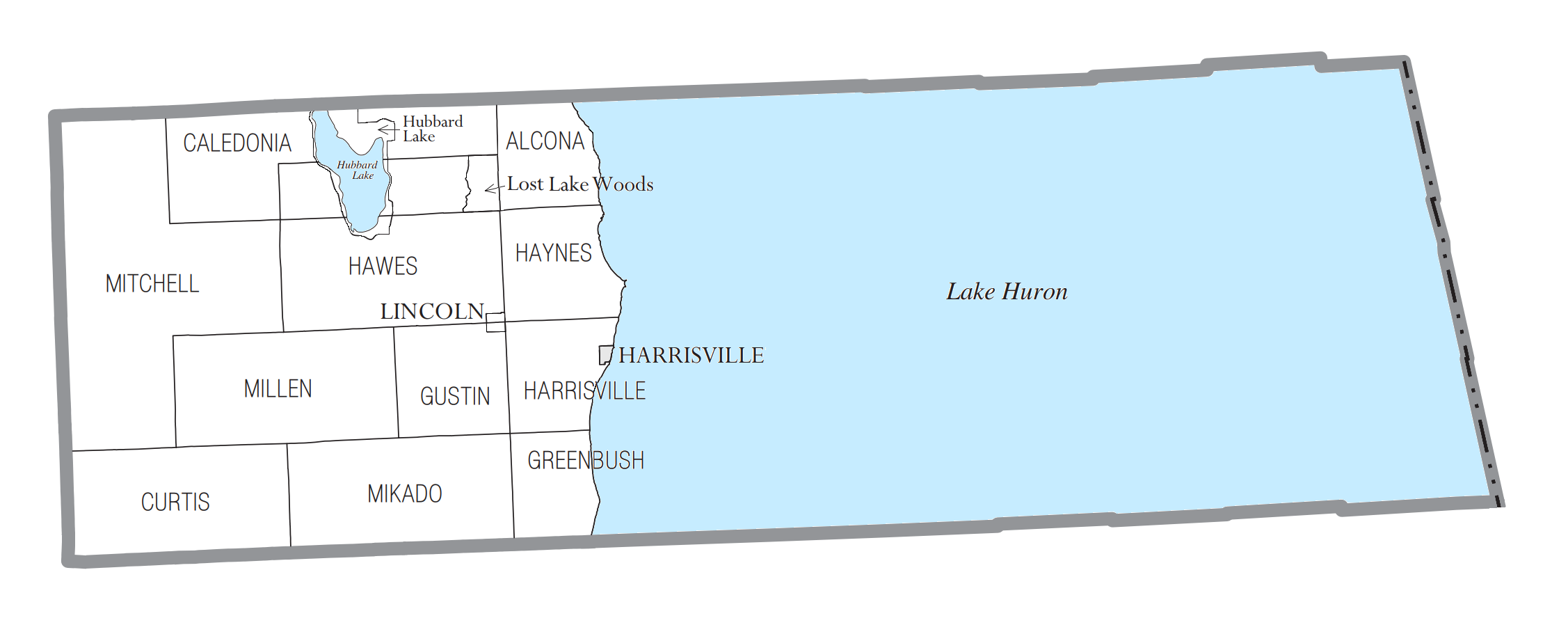
U.S. Census data map showing local municipal boundaries within Alcona County, as well as CDP boundaries. Shaded areas represent incorporated cities.

=== City ===
- Harrisville (county seat)

=== Village ===
- Lincoln

=== Civil townships ===
- Alcona Township
- Caledonia Township
- Curtis Township
- Greenbush Township
- Gustin Township
- Harrisville Township
- Hawes Township
- Haynes Township
- Mikado Township
- Millen Township
- Mitchell Township

=== Census-designated places ===
- Hubbard Lake
- Lost Lake Woods

=== Other unincorporated communities ===
- Alcona
- Alvin
- Backus Beach
- Barton City
- Black River
- Bryant
- Cheviers
- Curran
- Curtisville
- Glennie
- Greenbush
- Gustin
- Killmaster
- Kurtz
- Larson Beach
- Mikado
- Springport
- Spruce
- Wallace

=== Ghost town ===
- Bamfield

== Government ==
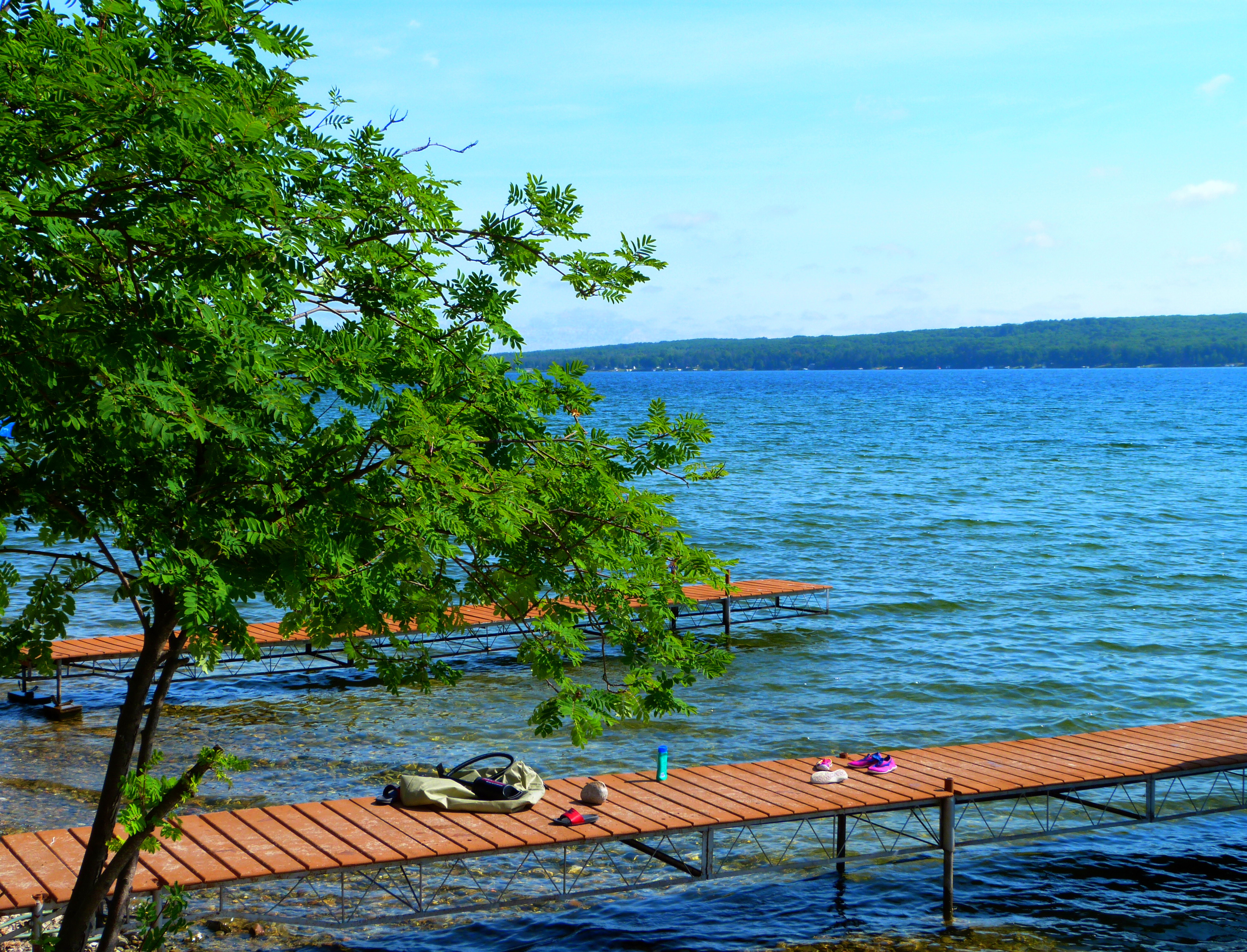
Hubbard Lake

The county government maintains rural roads, operates the local courts, records deeds, mortgages, and vital records, administers public health regulations, and works with state agencies to provide social services. The county board of commissioners controls the budget and has limited authority to make laws or ordinances. In Michigan, most local government functions — police and fire, building and zoning, tax assessment, street maintenance, etc. — are the responsibility of individual cities and townships.

The Alcona County Circuit Court is part of the 23rd Circuit of Michigan. This multicounty circuit also includes Arenac, Iosco and Oscoda Counties. This court was previously part of the 26th Circuit, which included Alpena and Montmorency Counties.

=== Elected officials ===
- Prosecuting Attorney: Thomas Jay Weichel
- Sheriff: Scott A. Stephenson
- County Clerk/Circuit Court Clerk: Stephany Eller
- County Treasurer: Cheryl L. Franks
- Register of Deeds: Melissa A. Cordes
- Road Commissioners: Alfred J. Scully, Harry L. Harvey, Theodore R. Somers

(as of May 2018)

== Demographics ==
Historical population
Census	Pop.	Note	%±
1860	185		—
1870	696		276.2%
1880	3,107		346.4%
1890	5,409		74.1%
1900	5,691		5.2%
1910	5,703		0.2%
1920	5,912		3.7%
1930	4,989		−15.6%
1940	5,463		9.5%
1950	5,856		7.2%
1960	6,352		8.5%
1970	7,113		12.0%
1980	9,740		36.9%
1990	10,145		4.2%
2000	11,719		15.5%
2010	10,942		−6.6%
2020	10,167		−7.1%
2025 (est.)	10,556	▲	3.8%
US Decennial Census; 1790-1960 1900-1990; 1990-2000 2010-2018

=== Racial and ethnic composition ===
Alcona County, Michigan – Racial and ethnic composition Note: the US Census treats Hispanic/Latino as an ethnic category. This table excludes Latinos from the racial categories and assigns them to a separate category. Hispanics/Latinos may be of any race.
Race / Ethnicity (NH = Non-Hispanic)	Pop 1980	Pop 1990	Pop 2000	Pop 2010	Pop 2020	% 1980	% 1990	% 2000	% 2010	% 2020
White alone (NH)	9,621	9,987	11,419	10,621	9,593	98.78%	98.44%	97.44%	97.07%	94.35%
Black or African American alone (NH)	6	23	19	13	23	0.06%	0.23%	0.16%	0.12%	0.23%
Native American or Alaska Native alone (NH)	44	56	71	62	57	0.45%	0.55%	0.61%	0.57%	0.56%
Asian alone (NH)	16	23	19	25	14	0.16%	0.23%	0.16%	0.23%	0.14%
Native Hawaiian or Pacific Islander alone (NH)	x	x	1	1	1	x	x	0.01%	0.01%	0.01%
Other race alone (NH)	4	1	4	5	27	0.04%	0.01%	0.03%	0.05%	0.27%
Mixed race or Multiracial (NH)	x	x	105	91	330	x	x	0.90%	0.83%	3.25%
Hispanic or Latino (any race)	49	55	81	124	122	0.50%	0.54%	0.69%	1.13%	1.20%
Total	9,740	10,145	11,719	10,942	10,167	100.00%	100.00%	100.00%	100.00%	100.00%

=== 2020 census ===
As of the 2020 census, the county had a population of 10,167. The median age was 58.2 years. 13.2% of residents were under the age of 18 and 35.8% of residents were 65 years of age or older. For every 100 females there were 103.0 males, and for every 100 females age 18 and over there were 103.5 males age 18 and over.

The racial makeup of the county was 94.9% White, 0.2% Black or African American, 0.6% American Indian and Alaska Native, 0.1% Asian, <0.1% Native Hawaiian and Pacific Islander, 0.4% from some other race, and 3.8% from two or more races. Hispanic or Latino residents of any race comprised 1.2% of the population.

7.1% of residents lived in urban areas, while 92.9% lived in rural areas.

There were 4,907 households in the county, of which 16.0% had children under the age of 18 living in them. Of all households, 49.7% were married-couple households, 22.6% were households with a male householder and no spouse or partner present, and 21.3% were households with a female householder and no spouse or partner present. About 33.6% of all households were made up of individuals and 19.6% had someone living alone who was 65 years of age or older.

There were 10,263 housing units, of which 52.2% were vacant. Among occupied housing units, 88.9% were owner-occupied and 11.1% were renter-occupied. The homeowner vacancy rate was 2.6% and the rental vacancy rate was 13.7%.

=== 2010 census ===
As of the 2010 United States census, there were 10,942 people living in the county. 97.9% were White, 0.6% Native American, 0.2% Asian, 0.1% Black or African American, 0.2% of some other race and 0.9% of two or more races. 1.1% were Hispanic or Latino (of any race).

=== 2000 census ===
In 2000, the median income for a household in the county was $31,362, and the median income for a family was $35,669. Males had a median income of $29,712 versus $20,566 for females. The per capita income for the county was $17,653. About 9.10% of families and 12.60% of the population were below the poverty line, including 17.80% of those under age 18 and 9.00% of those age 65 or over.

== Education ==
Alcona County is served by three public school districts. Public school district boundaries are not coterminous with the county boundary or any municipality boundaries within the county. Only one district, Alcona Community Schools, is entirely contained within the county, enrolling 690 students for the 2021–2022 school year.

Students on the southern side of the county are assigned to Oscoda Area Schools in the neighboring county of Iosco, while students on the western side of the county in Mitchell Township are assigned to Fairview Area School District, based in Oscoda County. Each school district is supported by a different intermediate school district, with the majority of students enrolled in the county being covered by the Alpena–Montmorency–Alcona Education Service District, based in Alpena.

=== Districts ===
School districts include:

- Alcona Community Schools
- Fairview Area School District
- Oscoda Area Schools

== Politics ==
Alcona County has been reliably Republican since the beginning. Since 1884, the county has voted against the Republican nominee for president only five times.

United States presidential election results for Alcona County, Michigan
Year	Republican		Democratic		Third party(ies)	
Year	No.	%	No.	%	No.	%
1884	545	61.51%	339	38.26%	2	0.23%
1888	645	55.60%	502	43.28%	13	1.12%
1892	556	57.32%	380	39.18%	34	3.51%
1896	743	70.90%	275	26.24%	30	2.86%
1900	849	84.06%	145	14.36%	16	1.58%
1904	901	87.31%	92	8.91%	39	3.78%
1908	824	76.37%	175	16.22%	80	7.41%
1912	291	29.45%	145	14.68%	552	55.87%
1916	573	53.20%	453	42.06%	51	4.74%
1920	1,043	75.85%	264	19.20%	68	4.95%
1924	1,027	72.32%	184	12.96%	209	14.72%
1928	1,149	78.81%	302	20.71%	7	0.48%
1932	881	47.83%	884	47.99%	77	4.18%
1936	1,276	52.95%	919	38.13%	215	8.92%
1940	1,648	65.89%	847	33.87%	6	0.24%
1944	1,503	67.40%	716	32.11%	11	0.49%
1948	1,425	65.73%	708	32.66%	35	1.61%
1952	1,441	65.06%	766	34.58%	8	0.36%
1956	1,991	71.52%	788	28.30%	5	0.18%
1960	2,053	66.25%	1,038	33.49%	8	0.26%
1964	1,199	42.59%	1,611	57.23%	5	0.18%
1968	1,852	58.76%	958	30.39%	342	10.85%
1972	2,434	65.91%	1,195	32.36%	64	1.73%
1976	2,328	52.87%	2,038	46.29%	37	0.84%
1980	2,905	57.39%	1,857	36.69%	300	5.93%
1984	3,223	66.41%	1,616	33.30%	14	0.29%
1988	2,966	60.47%	1,918	39.10%	21	0.43%
1992	2,247	38.88%	2,383	41.24%	1,149	19.88%
1996	2,227	40.09%	2,619	47.15%	709	12.76%
2000	3,152	52.56%	2,696	44.96%	149	2.48%
2004	3,592	55.00%	2,871	43.96%	68	1.04%
2008	3,404	53.02%	2,896	45.11%	120	1.87%
2012	3,571	58.50%	2,472	40.50%	61	1.00%
2016	4,201	67.78%	1,732	27.94%	265	4.28%
2020	4,848	68.63%	2,142	30.32%	74	1.05%
2024	5,257	70.25%	2,140	28.60%	86	1.15%

United States Senate election results for Alcona County, Michigan1
Year	Republican		Democratic		Third party(ies)	
Year	No.	%	No.	%	No.	%
2024	5,048	68.52%	2,133	28.95%	186	2.52%

Michigan Gubernatorial election results for Alcona County
Year	Republican		Democratic		Third party(ies)	
Year	No.	%	No.	%	No.	%
2022	3,802	63.57%	2,076	34.71%	103	1.72%

== Media ==
=== Newspapers ===
- The Alcona County Review located in Harrisville is the county's newspaper of record, and has served the community since 1877.
- The Alpena News serves the northeastern lower peninsula.
- The Oscoda Press is a weekly newspaper serving southern Alcona County and northern Iosco County.
- Daily editions of the Detroit Free Press and The Detroit News are available throughout the area.

== Radio ==
- WXTF-LP

== Historical markers ==
- Greenbush School
- West Harrisville Depot in Lincoln
- Springport Inn, Springport home of Civil War Captain Joseph VanBuskirk.

== Parks and recreation ==
There is a senior citizens center building that opened in the 1940s. In 2023 there was a controversy over how to use a $12,500,000 grant that was to be used to build a replacement building.

== Transportation ==
=== Highways ===
- US 23 — north of Standish, it has been designated the Sunrise Side Coastal Highway. Parallels the Lake Huron shore, connects with M-72 in Harrisville. US 23 is the most proximate connector to Alpena and Mackinaw City.
- M-65 — runs along the western side of the county, from US 23 north of Standish to Rogers City.
- M-72 — In 1936, downtown Harrisville became the eastern terminus of the 133 miles (214 kilometers) M-72, which runs across the lower peninsula from Empire, Michigan. It is one of three true cross peninsular highways.
- F-30 — runs from US 23 at Greenbush through Mikado to M-65 at Glennie.
- F-32 —
- F-41 — runs north–south from US 23 at Oscoda to US 23 south of Ossineke.

=== Airport ===
Alcona County has been a part of developing the Oscoda-Wurtsmith Airport, which became a public airport in 1993. It now occupies a portion of the former Wurtsmith Air Force Base, which is in Oscoda Township, Michigan in neighboring Iosco County, Michigan. It is primarily used for cargo and light general aviation activities. The Airport offers 24-hour near all weather daily access.

== See also ==
- List of counties in Michigan
- List of Michigan State Historic Sites in Alcona County, Michigan
- National Register of Historic Places listings in Alcona County, Michigan
