= Glennie, Michigan =

- Unincorporated community
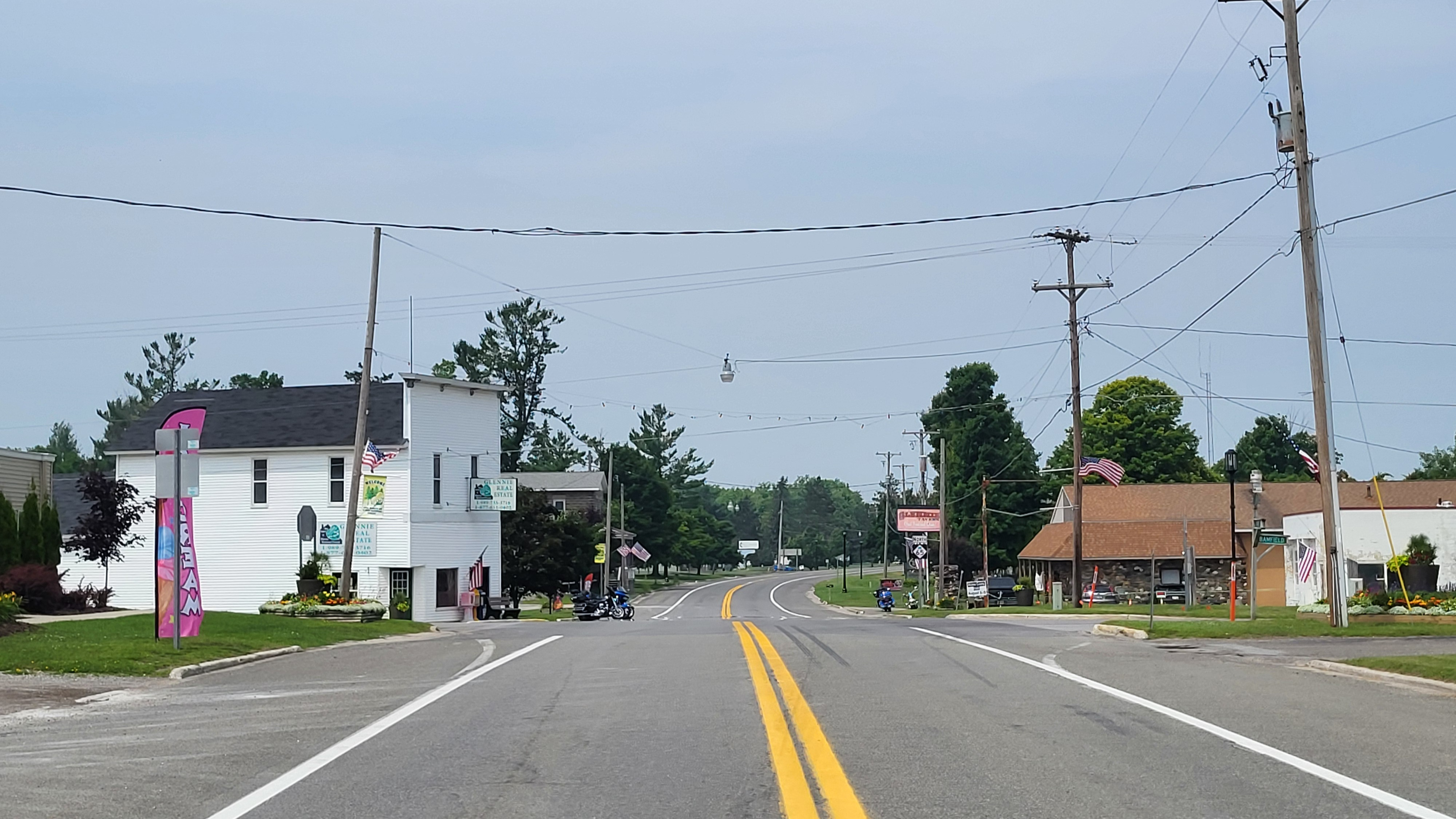
- Looking north along State Street (M-65)

- Location within Michigan Location within the United States
- Coordinates: 44°33′38″N 83°43′33″W
- Country: United States
- State: Michigan
- County: Alcona
- Township: Curtis
- Settled: 1889
- Elevation: 1,017 ft (310 m)
- Time zone: UTC-5 (Eastern (EST))
  - Summer (DST): UTC-4 (EDT)
- ZIP code(s): 48737
- Area code: 989
- GNIS feature ID: 626886

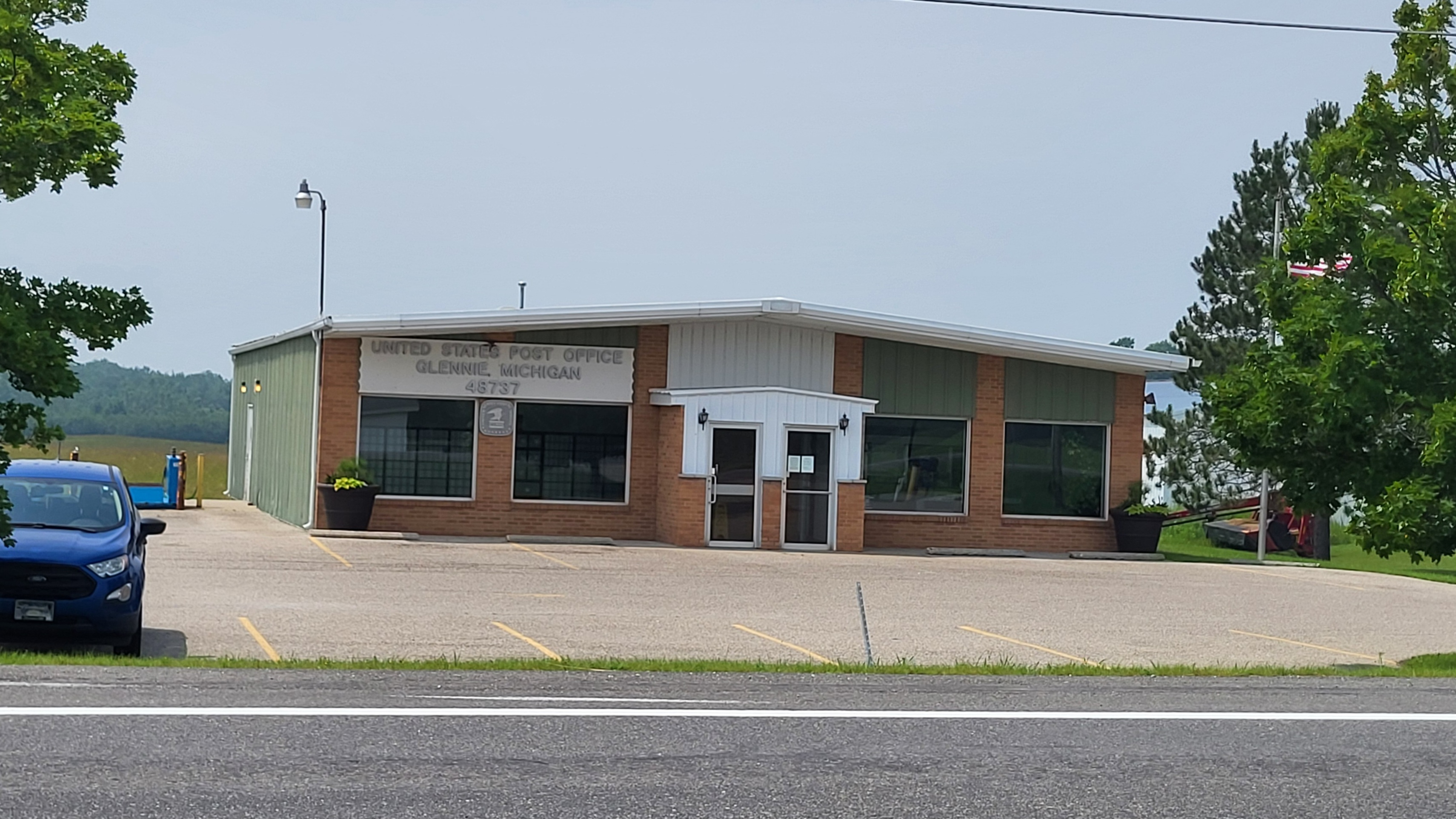
U.S. Post Office in Glennie

Glennie is an unincorporated community in the U.S. state of Michigan. The community is located within Curtis Township in Alcona County. As an unincorporated community, Glennie has no legally defined boundaries or population statistics of its own. However, a post office operates out of the community, with the ZIP Code 48737.

== History ==
Glennie was established as a depot on the Detroit and Mackinac Railway in 1889, known as 'Glennie Station'. A post office opened in the community on October 5, 1889. In 1894, the community's name was shortened to 'Glennie'. The village was platted in 1940.
