= Black River (Alcona County) =

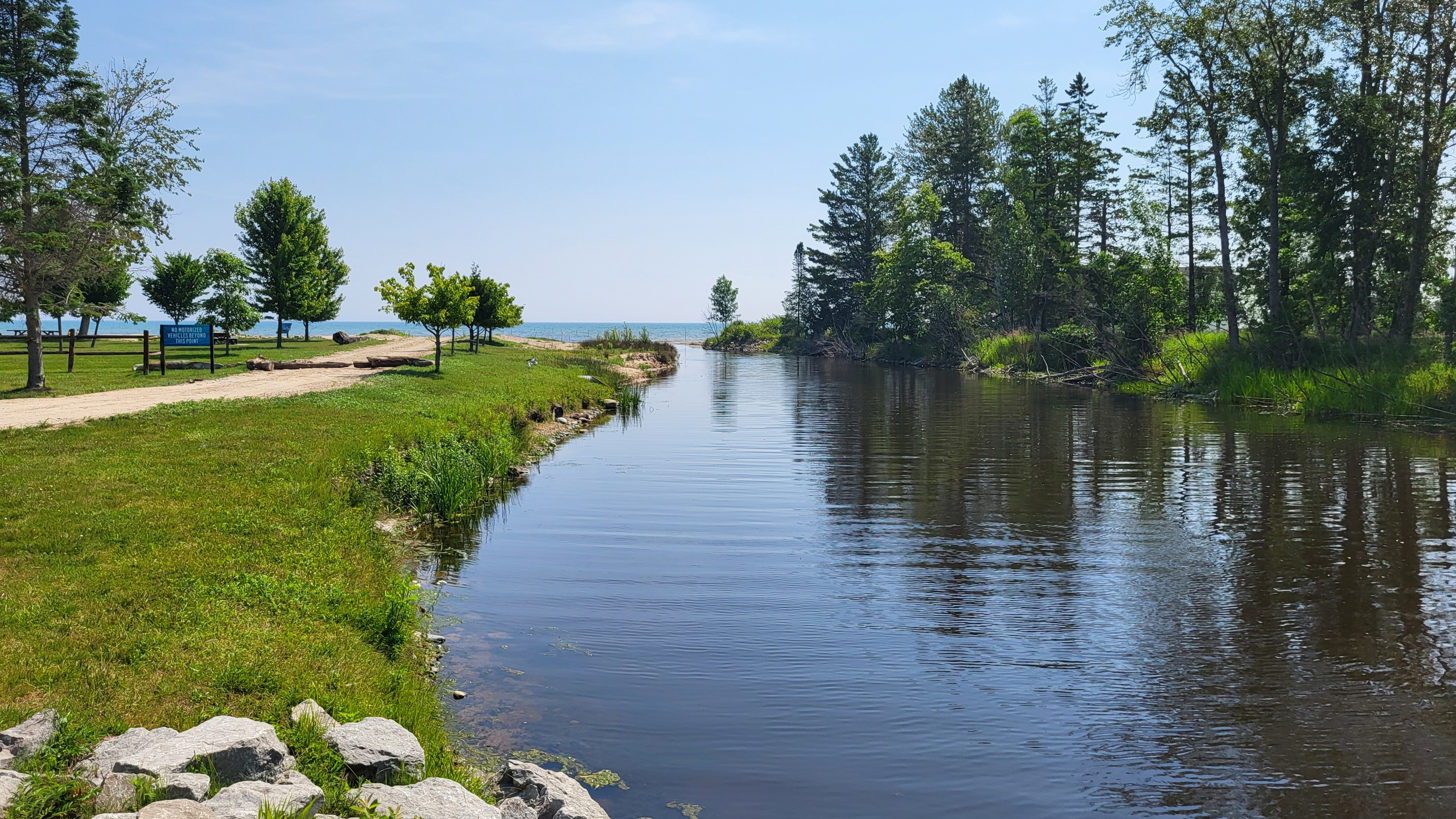
- The river mouth in the community of Black River

Location
- Country: United States

Physical characteristics
- Mouth
  - location: Lake Huron
  - elevation: 581 ft (177 m)

Black River is a 15.5-mile-long (24.9 km) river in Alcona County in the U.S. state of Michigan. The main branch rises in northern Harrisville Township at and flows north through Haynes Township and Alcona Township and empties into Lake Huron at at the unincorporated community of Black River.

The north branch rises in Sanborn Township in southern Alpena County at . A large portion of its drainage basin is known as the Black River Swamp. The north branch joins the main branch in Alcona Township approximately 1.5 miles (2.4 km) from the mouth at .

Tributaries (from the mouth):

- North Branch Black River
  - Potvin Lake
  - Gauthier Creek
  - DeRocher Creek
  - Butternut Creek
    - Liston Creek
- Silver Creek
- Haynes Creek

During the lumber boom, the town was formerly the local headquarters for Russell A. Alger's lumber company. The house on Lake Shore Road (just north of the bridge on the west side) was removed in 2009; although Alger Street runs adjacent to the river.
