= Black River, Michigan =

- Unincorporated community
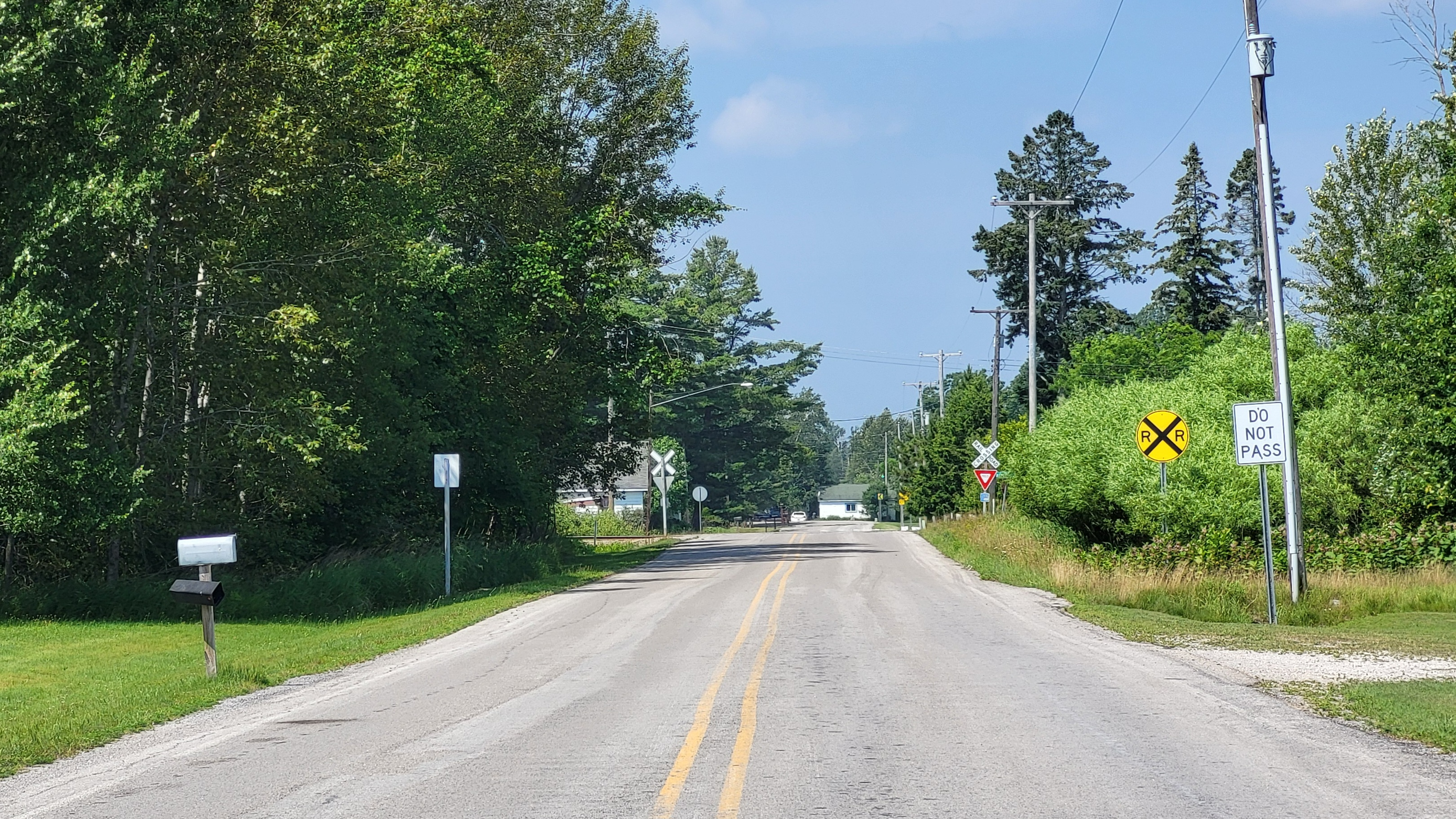
- Looking west along East Black River Road

- Location within the state of Michigan Location within the United States
- Coordinates: 44°49′02″N 83°18′12″W
- Country: United States
- State: Michigan
- County: Alcona
- Township: Alcona
- Settled: 1849
- Elevation: 587 ft (179 m)
- Time zone: UTC-5 (Eastern (EST))
  - Summer (DST): UTC-4 (EDT)
- ZIP code(s): 48721
- Area code: 989
- GNIS feature ID: 632295

Black River is an unincorporated community in Alcona County in the U.S. state of Michigan. The community is located within Alcona Township at the mouth of the Black River along Lake Huron.

As an unincorporated community, Black River has no legally defined boundaries or population statistics of its own but does have its own postal services using the 48721 ZIP Code.

== Geography ==
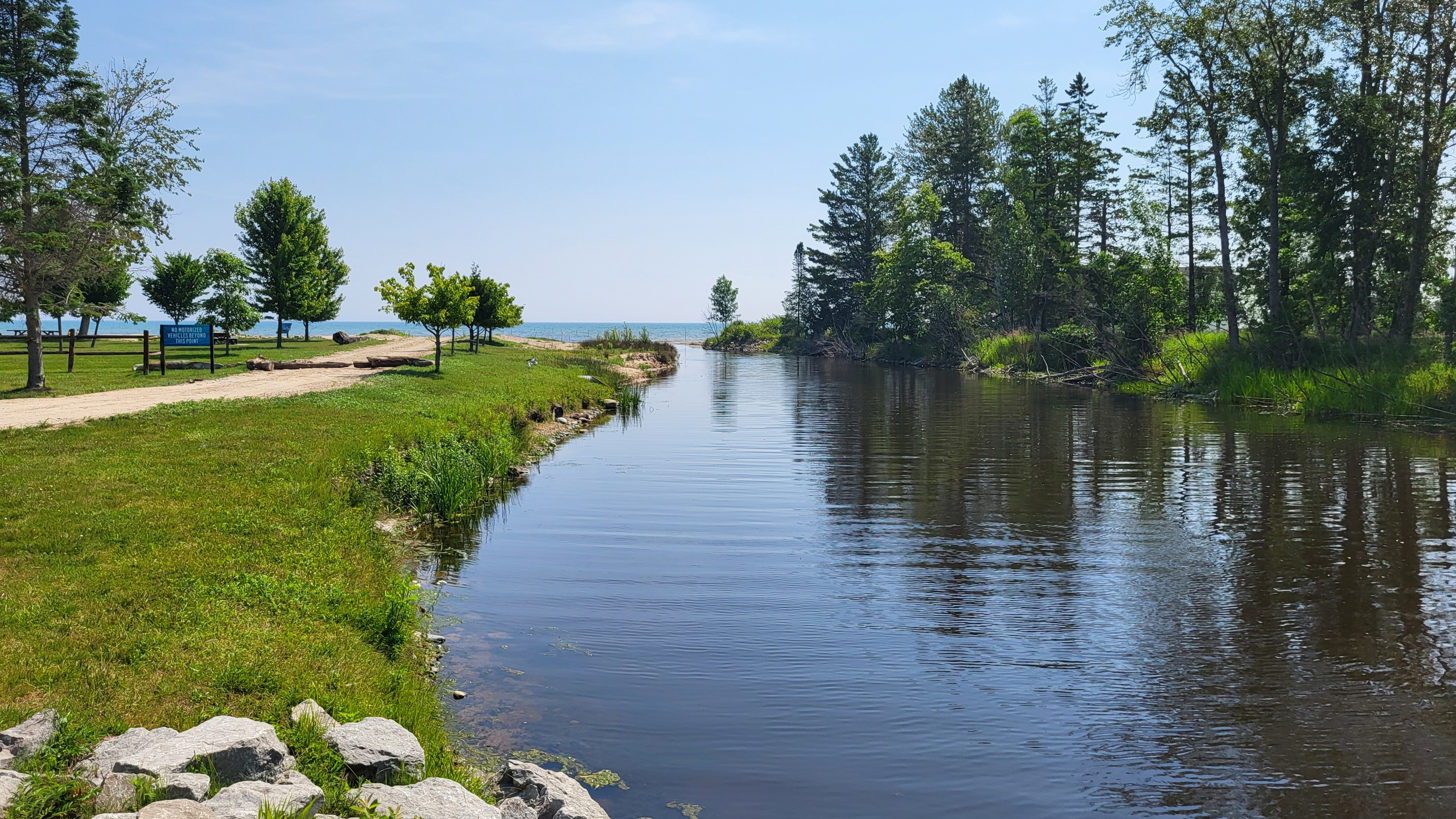
The mouth of the Black River at Lake Huron within Alcona Township Park

Black River is a small rural community located in northeast Alcona County in the Northern Michigan region. It is located within Alcona Township at the mouth of the Black River along the shores of Lake Huron. The community sits at an elevation of 587 feet (179 m) above sea level. The small and uninhabited Black River Island is located just north of the river mouth. The surrounding waters are included within the southern portion of the Thunder Bay National Marine Sanctuary, and the surrounding forest lands are included as part of the Huron Shores Area of the Huron National Forest.

The community is not served by any major roadways, although U.S. Route 23 (US 23) runs about 3.0 miles (4.8 km) to the west. A rail line belonging to the Alpena Branch of the Lake State Railway runs directly through Black River, although the community does not have any rail passenger services. Other nearby unincorporated communities include Ossineke and Spruce to the northwest, Lost Lake Woods to the southwest, and Alcona to the south. The nearest incorporated municipalities are the city of Harrisville about 13.0 miles (20.9 km) to the south and the village of Lincoln about 14.0 miles (22.5 km) to the southwest.

Alcona Township Black River Park consists of 5.0 acres (2.0 ha) of land at the mouth of the Black River, which is jointly managed in part by Alcona Township and the Michigan Department of Natural Resources. The park includes the mouth of the river and a beachfront along Lake Huron. The river is dredged annually to allow for better boating access, and the state maintains a public boat launch at the park. While the launch is paved, larger boats are not recommended due to the shallow waters. It is the nearest launch for boaters wishing to travel to Negwegon State Park, which is located just north of the community. Alcona Township Black River Park is part of the US 23 Heritage Route, although it is not actually along US 23.

Black River has its own postal service using the 48721 ZIP Code, which serves the northeastern portions of Alcona Township, including the southern portion of Negwegon State Park. The ZIP Code also serves the northeastern corner of Haynes Township to the south. The postal services are handled by other nearby post offices in Spruce, Harrisville, and Lincoln, as Black River itself no longer contains its own physical post office building. Black River is served by Alcona Community Schools to the south in Gustin Township.

== History ==
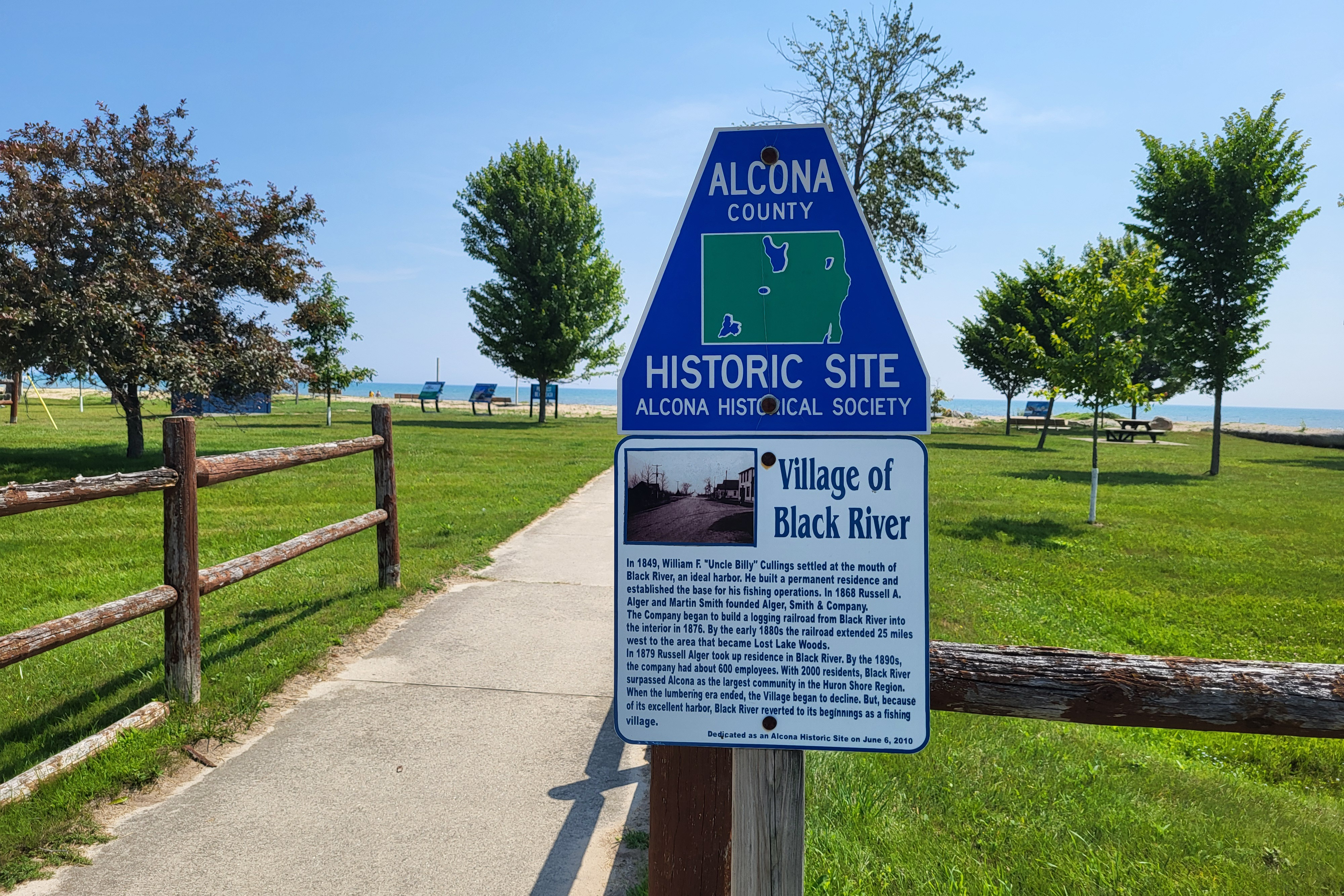
Alcona County Historic Site marker

The area was first settled by William Cullings in 1849 along the mouth of the Black River, and a community was developed by French trappers and fishermen. The area was originally part of the unorganized Alcona County but was administered by the larger Michilimackinac County. The area transferred through several jurisdictions and ultimately became part of Alcona Township in 1867, and Alcona County was formally organized in 1869. The community was not formally recognized and did not appear in the county's first published map in 1873; the area was originally served by the Alcona post office, which was established in 1867.

=== Lumbering community ===
In 1868, the Alger, Smith & Company under the ownership of Russell A. Alger and Martin Smith began their lumber operations along the Black River. In 1876, the company built the first railway in the area. The rail line ran inland for about 25 miles (40 km) to Lost Lake Woods and served as a vital transportation route to bring lumber to sawmills along the Black River. The company quickly grew to become the largest pine timber producer in the world. The area became a mix of lumbering and commercial fishing, and a post office was established here on February 9, 1877, under the name Black River. Edgar Cheney served as the first postmaster.

Alger himself moved to Black River in 1879. He built a large mansion and helped established the railway in the area. His company owned most of the land in the Black River area, although he would move away to serve as Governor of Michigan for one term from 1885–1887 and later served in national politics. By 1886, the Alger, Smith & Company founded the Detroit, Bay City & Alpena Railroad to better serve the lumber industry, and the first rail line extended along the Lake Huron shoreline north to the city of Alpena. In 1894, the post office name was shortened to Blackriver. By 1901, up to 90 million cedar logs were processed annually and shipped or transported by rail from Black River. At its height, the company employed over 600 workers, and Black River grew to about 2,000 residents, which made it the largest community in the region outside of Alpena. In 1903, the nearby Alcona post office closed, while the Blackriver post office remained open.

At the turn of the century, the lumber industry declined in the area. In 1906, the Alger, Smith & Company ceased operations, and the company's assets were sold to a Bay City firm to the south. The remaining buildings were torn down, including a boarding house, sawmill, barn, and tenant houses. The closure of the company, which had operated out of Black River for the past 20 years, left the community nearly deserted. Many businesses and residents left Black River, although a small population remained and transitioned primarily to a fishing community. The train depot remained and was occasionally used until it was moved in 1919 and eventually closed around 1927.

=== Village of Black River ===
Prior to the lumber boom in the area, Alcona Township, which was organized in 1867, recorded a population of only 146 at the 1870 census. The township contained no incorporated villages, although Alcona and Black River were established communities. At some point prior to the 1880 census, both Alcona and Black River incorporated as villages within the township. At the 1880 census, Alcona recorded a slightly higher population of 198, while Black River recorded 182 residents. The township also recorded its highest population ever of 1,214 residents.

Soon after, parts of the township were set aside to form several other townships within the county, and Alcona Township's population decreased significantly as a result. Although the lumber industry continued to thrive in the village, Black River was not listed on the next 1890 census; it disincorporated or simply did not report a population. Black River did not appear on any future census, which meant its incorporated village status only lasted for a brief period before and after the 1880 census.

=== Shipwrecks ===
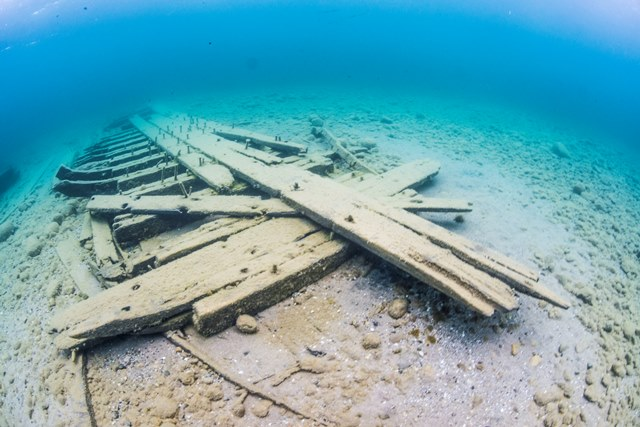
The wreckage of the Alvin Buckingham, which sank in 1870 near Black River Island

Due to the high volume of shipping and the uneven coastline along Black River Island, numerous shipwrecks took place in the area. The nearest lighthouse is Sturgeon Point Light about five miles (8.0 km) to the south, even though the Black River area was heavily used for transporting lumber. The following is a list of shipwrecks that took place in the Black River vicinity.

- The Alvin Buckingham was a wooden schooner that broke apart and sank off Black River Island in shallow water during a storm on October 19, 1870.
- The City of Alpena caught fire and sank in shallow water on August 9, 1880.
- The Loretta was a tugboat that caught fire on October 7, 1886, while being loaded with cargo in Black River, and it was quickly towed away from shore and sank.
- The Egyptian caught fire and sank at a much deeper depth of 230 feet (70 m) on December 1, 1897.
- The Ishpeming ran aground along Black River Island, breaking up and sinking in 12 feet (3.7 m) of water on November 29, 1903.
- The William H. Rounds ran aground near Black River and sank on May 2, 1905.
- The Shamrock became waterlogged and beached at Black River on June 24, 1905. It was later towed away and intentionally sank.

There are many more shipwrecks along the Lake Huron shoreline, and the surrounding waters were included as part of the new Thunder Bay National Marine Sanctuary in 2000, and the southern area extending to Black River was added by 2014. Numerous shipwrecks within the sanctuary are near Black River, and some of the remains of these shipwrecks can still be seen underwater.

=== Recent history ===
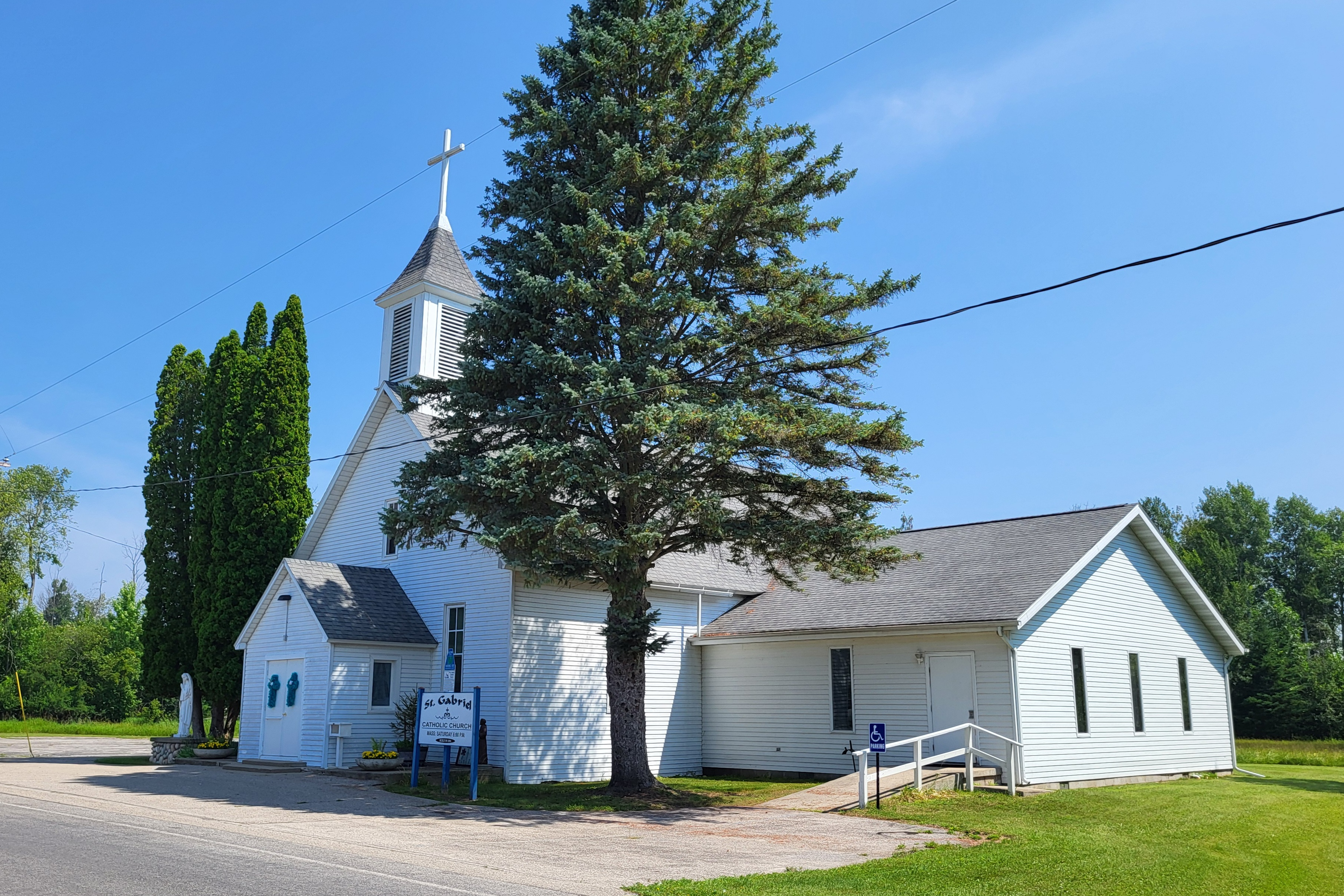
St. Gabriel Catholic Church, built in 1894

Following the end of the lumber industry and the closure of the train depot, Black River continued to sustain as a small fishing community with limited tourism and economic growth. In 1926, travel through the area benefited from the creation of the original U.S. Route 23 (US 23), which followed the earlier Shore Trail route. While US 23 ran very close to the Lake Huron shoreline throughout the region, the highway moved slightly inland near Black River and did not run directly through the community. The highway runs south–north about three miles (4.8 km) west of Black River, which is directly accessible via East Black River Road. This road also serves as the only main road access point to reach Negwegon State Park, which occupies 4,118 acres (16.7 km^{2}) of state land just north of the community. Originally known as Alpena State Park, the undeveloped state park was established in 1962 and renamed in 1970. The railway line continues to run through Black River, although there is no longer any rail service or train depot in the community. The single line is operated by Lake State Railway.

Among the oldest structures in the community is St. Gabriel Catholic Church located at 5570 North Lake Shore Drive just north of the river. The church was built in 1894 on land donated by the Alger, Smith & Company to serve the religious needs of the community. The church remains in operation and is part of the Roman Catholic Diocese of Gaylord. The exterior of the building is mostly unchanged since its original construction, and the church is listed as an Alcona County Historic Site. The community itself is also listed as an Alcona County Historic Site and has a historic marker located in the township park along the river. The Black River post office, which was established in 1877, remains in operation. The name was shortened to Blackriver in 1894, and it was ultimately renamed back to Black River in 1958. While the post office name remains active, it no longer has its own physical post office building in the community. The Black River post office building closed on February 26, 2011.

Due to sand continuously piling up along the mouth of the Black River, the Michigan Department of Natural Resources completes regular dredging of the river to allow for boats to travel from the river into Lake Huron, which is especially important for emergency water services and rescues. At times, boats traveling from the nearby public boat launch are unable to actually pass through the narrow and sandy river mouth, although it does not appear to affect the native fish population. Fishing remains popular in the area, and the river is known to have a population of various salmon and trout species.

== Notable people ==
- Russell A. Alger, army officer, lumber magnate, and politician, briefly lived in Black River
