= Harrisville Township =

Harrisville Township may refer to the following places in the United States:

- Harrisville Township, Medina County, Ohio
- Harrisville Township, Michigan
