= Black River Island =

Island

Coordinates: 44.83194°N 83.28444°W

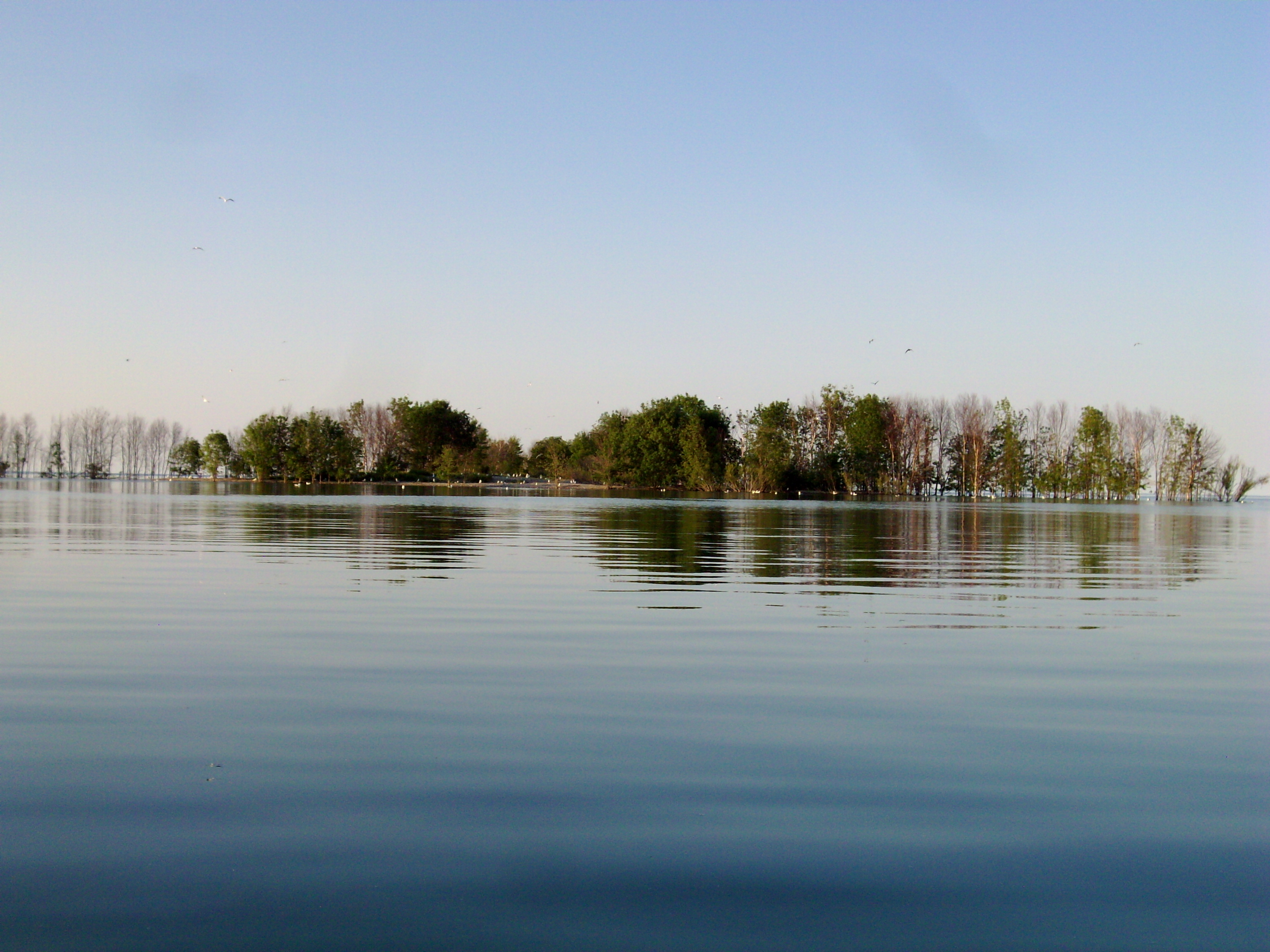
Island as viewed from SW

Black River Island is an island in Lake Huron. It is part of a series of shoals around the mouth of Black River and is 3/4 mile (1.2 km) northeast of it. The island is included within the unincorporated community of Black River in Alcona Township, Michigan.

The uninhabited rocky island is about 1,000 feet (305 m) long. Its area is less than 1 acre (0.4 ha) and varies with lake levels.

The shoals in the area are a boating hazard. The schooner William H. Rounds, carrying a load of coal, ran aground on the island in May 1905 and was destroyed. Further south the tugboat Loretta, carrying a load of chain, broke its propeller and caught fire in October 1896. The Ishpeming, a schooner carrying a load of coal, ran aground in November 1903. It was scrapped and abandoned. These are marked by buoys.

In the past, owners of the island have shown interest in selling it to wildlife organizations. The island is approximately 7 miles south of Scarecrow Island which is part of the Michigan Islands National Wildlife Refuge.
