= Harrisville Airport =

Public use airport in Harrisville, Michigan

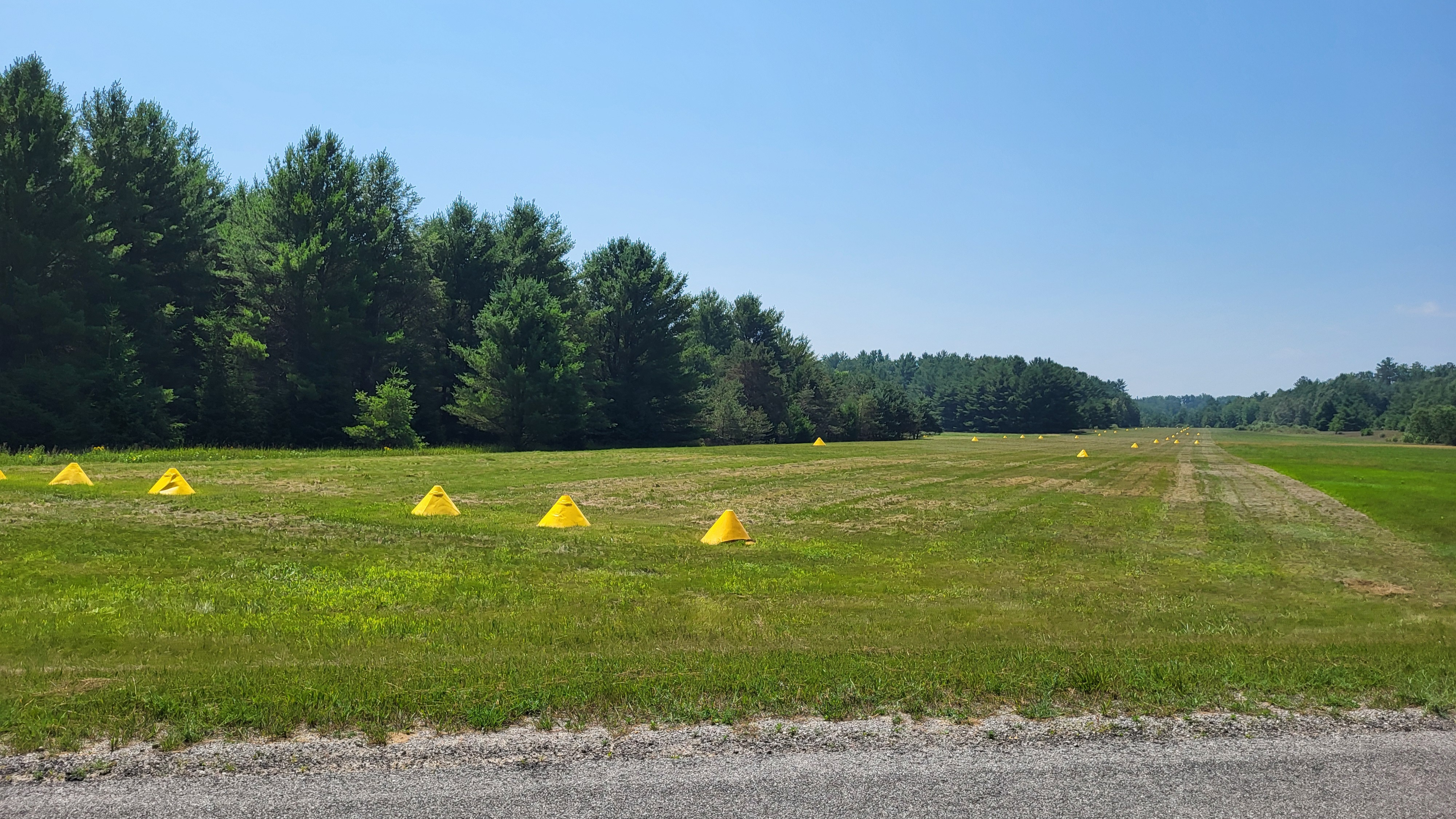
- View of the runway from Walker Road
- IATA: none; ICAO: none; FAA LID: 5Y0

Summary
- Owner: City of Harrisville
- Serves: Harrisville, Michigan
- Time zone: UTC−05:00 (-5)
  - Summer (DST): UTC−04:00 (-4)
- Elevation AMSL: 675 ft / 206 m
- Coordinates: 44°40′06″N 083°18′17″W
- Interactive map of Harrisville Airport

Runways
Direction	Length		Surface
Direction	ft	m	Surface
3/21	2,140	652	Turf

Statistics (2019)
- Aircraft Movements: 150

The Harrisville Airport (FAA LID: 5Y0) is a publicly owned, public use airport located one mile (1.6 km) northwest of Harrisville, Alcona County, Michigan. The airport sits on 58 acres (23 ha) of land at an elevation of 675 feet (206 m).

== Facilities and aircraft ==
The airport has one runway, designated as Runway 3/21. The runway measures 2,140 by 60 feet (652 m × 18 m) and is made of turf. For the 12-month period ending December 31, 2019, the airport averaged 150 aircraft operations per year, just over 12 per month. It is entirely general aviation. There are no aircraft based at the airport.

The aircraft does not have a fixed base operator, and no fuel is available at the airport.

== Accidents and incidents ==
- On August 30, 2003, a Grumman American AA-5A sustained substantial damage during a forced landing following a loss of engine power during initial climb from Harrisville Airport. Prior to engine startup, the pilot performed a preflight inspection of the airplane and visually verified the fuel quantity to be approximately 27 US gallons (100 L). The pilot stated that, prior to takeoff, he completed a "standard runup and instrument checks." After takeoff, the airplane cleared tree obstructions by 100 feet (30 m), and the pilot retracted the wing flaps at 1,000 feet (300 m) mean sea level (msl). The engine "cut out" at approximately 1,200 feet (370 m) msl while the pilot was departing the traffic pattern. The pilot started a descent to maintain airspeed. The airplane impacted between two pine trees during the forced landing. The cause of the engine failure could not be determined.
- On September 1, 2019, a Beech K35 Bonanza overran the runway during a rejected takeoff from Harrisville. The aircraft veered left while rolling down the runway, and a loud noise was heard from the end of the runway. The airplane then turned sharply right and then slid off the runway. It came to rest in trees off the side of the runway. The pilot stated that he could not build enough speed because of the tall grass on the runway. The pilot also stated that he knew he did not have the speed or altitude to make it over the trees at the end of the runway, so he put the airplane back on the ground before going into the woods.
- On March 26, 2020, a Cessna 177 Cardinal was substantially damaged when it was involved in an accident at Harrisville Municipal Airport. The pilot reported he was giving rides to friends in the airport's traffic pattern when, on the third landing, the airplane veered off the grass runway due to a crosswind. The right wing raised up and the pilot was not able to maintain directional control.

== See also ==
- List of airports in Michigan
