= Harrisville State Park =

State park in Michigan, United States

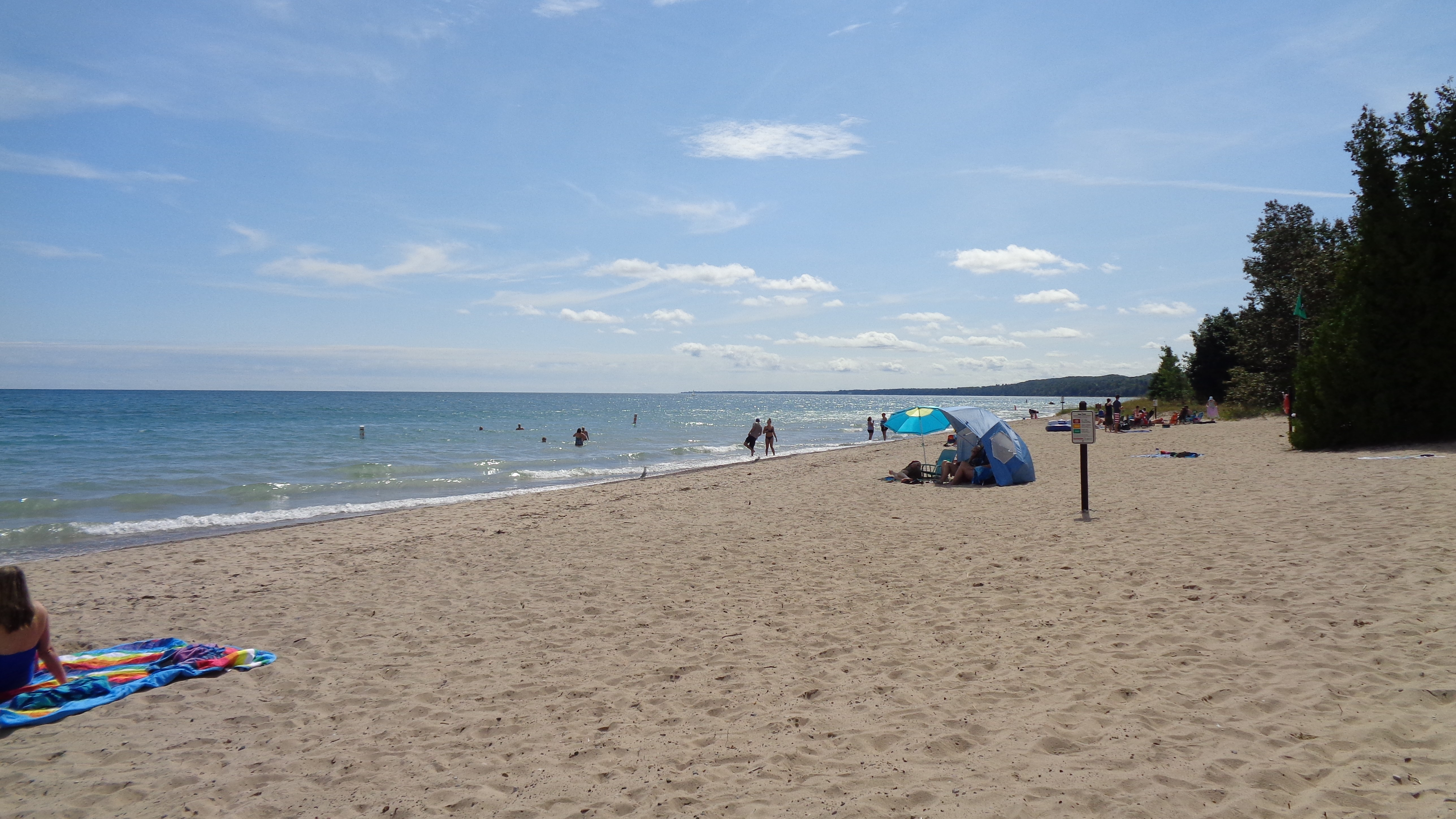
- Beachfront along Lake Huron

- Location within Michigan Location within the United States
- Location: Harrisville / Harrisville Township, Alcona County, Michigan, United States
- Coordinates: 44°38′58″N 83°17′35″W
- Area: 107 acres (43 ha)
- Elevation: 587 feet (179 m)
- Established: 1920
- Administrator: Michigan Department of Natural Resources
- Visitors: 151,273 (in 1996)
- Designation: Michigan state park
- Website: Official website

Harrisville State Park is a public recreation area covering 107 acres (43 ha) on the shore of Lake Huron off U.S. Route 23 in Harrisville and Harrisville Township, Alcona County, Michigan. The state park contains more than 100 acres of heavily forested land as well as a mile-long sandy beach. It is considered an important location for birders, with large and varied migratory populations of warblers and other song birds. The park is administered by the Michigan Department of Natural Resources.

== History ==
Harrisville State Park was among 13 parks established in 1920 following the creation of the Michigan State Parks Commission a year earlier. It originally covered only six acres (2.4 ha). The park's Cedar Run Nature Trail was cut through the forested areas of the park as early as 1945.

== Wildlife ==
Harrisville State Park offers outstanding birding opportunities in May when numerous warbler species may be seen. Other species include nuthatches, woodpeckers, wrens, thrushes, vireos, and sparrows.

== Activities and amenities ==
The park features a swimming beach, bathhouse, picnic areas, sports fields, carry-in boat launch, 195 campground sites, cabin, and mini-cabins. The 2-mile (3.2 km) Cedar Run Nature Trail crosses forested areas of the park. A section of beach north of the campers area is pet friendly.

The park offers bike rentals, in coordination with the opening of the Alcona Heritage Route Multi-use Trail. The trail is a three-quarter mile paved, multi-use trail out of the park that connects to the trail to Harrisville.
