= Haynes Township, Michigan =

- Civil township
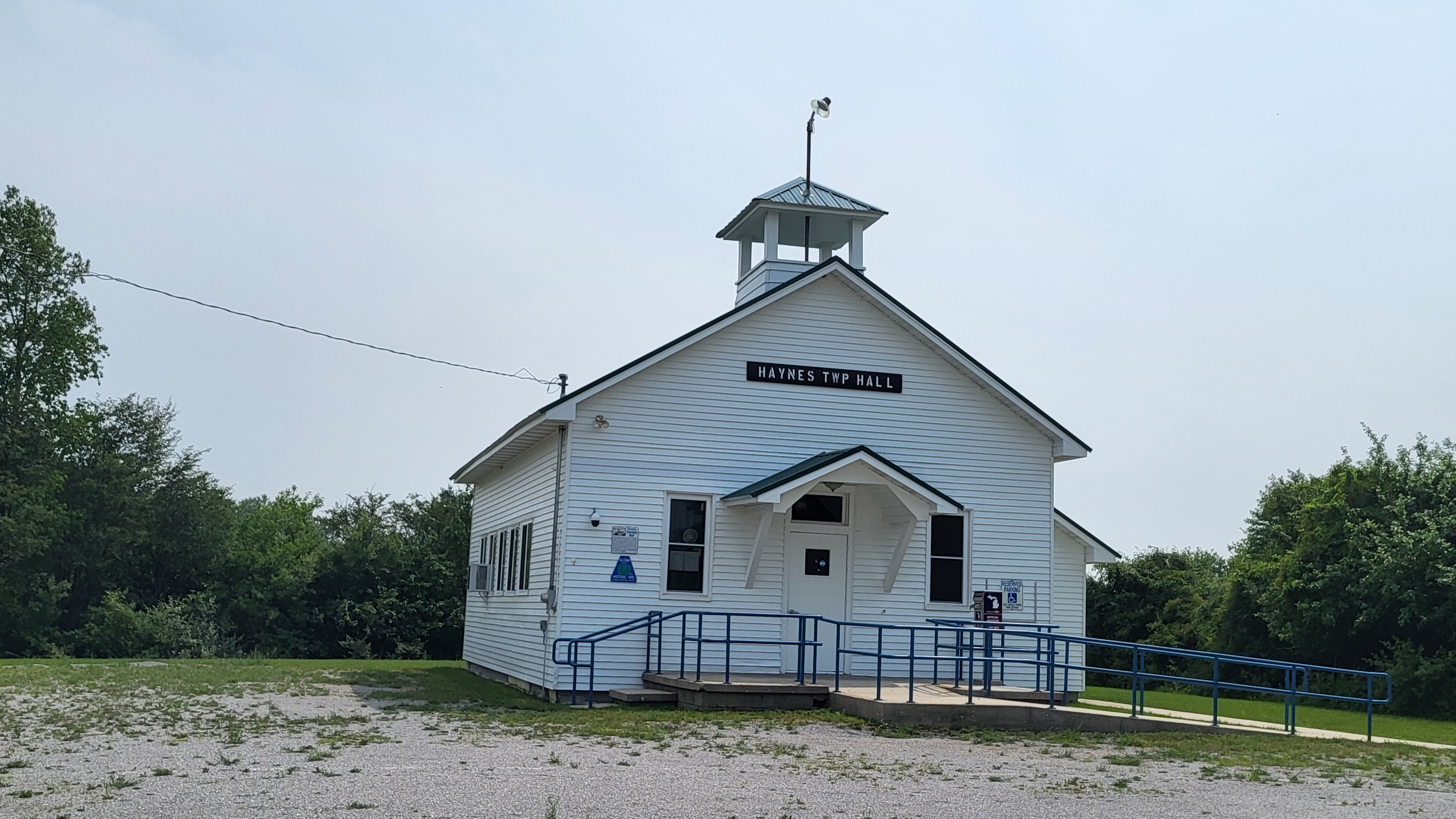
- Haynes Township Hall

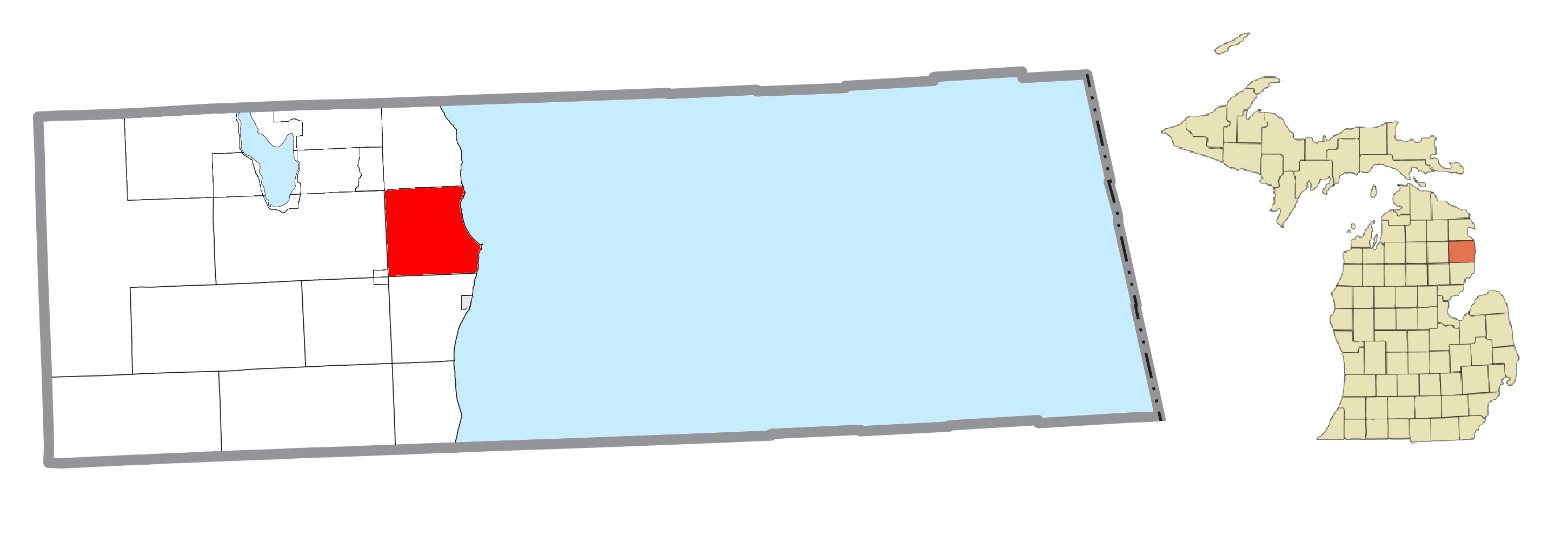
- Location within Alcona County

- Location within the state of Michigan Location within the United States
- Coordinates: 44°43′57″N 83°19′38″W
- Country: United States
- State: Michigan
- County: Alcona

Government
  - Supervisor: James Effrick
  - Clerk: Sharon Schefferly

Area
  - Total: 35.07 sq mi (90.8 km^{2})
  - Land: 34.93 sq mi (90.5 km^{2})
  - Water: 0.14 sq mi (0.36 km^{2})
- Elevation: 790 ft (240 m)

Population (2020)
  - Total: 653
  - Density: 18.7/sq mi (7.22/km^{2})
- Time zone: UTC-5 (Eastern (EST))
  - Summer (DST): UTC-4 (EDT)
- ZIP code(s): 48721 (Black River); 48740 (Harrisville); 48742 (Lincoln)
- Area code: 989
- FIPS code: 26-37380
- GNIS feature ID: 1626456
- Website: Official website

Haynes Township is a civil township of Alcona County in the U.S. state of Michigan. The population was 653 at the 2020 census.

== Communities ==
- Alcona is an unincorporated community located along the shores of Lake Huron in the northern portion of the township a 44°45′36″N 83°17′52″W. It was first settled around 1858 by Canadian fisherman William Hill, and the community was originally called The Cove. It was renamed Alcona after the name of the county, which was devised by Henry Rowe Schoolcraft as an Indian word that means "beautiful plain." A post office was established on January 9, 1867. Fishing was the primary activity of the community until about 1865 when it transitioned into lumber until 1880. Alcona never prospered, and the post office closed on August 15, 1903.

Robert L. Bunting's book, Into Oblivion, chronicles the 1880 sinking of the passenger steamer Marine City near the ghost town of Alcona, Michigan, on Lake Huron. This well-researched work details the disaster, local history, and life in the lumber era, featuring illustrations by maritime artist Robert McGreevy and detailed interviews with locals.

Alcona and the Marine City are commemorated in Michigan historical marker L2223.

== Geography ==
According to the U.S. Census Bureau, the township has a total area of 35.07 square miles (90.83 km^{2}), of which 34.93 square miles (90.47 km^{2}) is land and 0.14 square miles (0.36 km^{2}) (0.40%) is water.

Portions of the township are included in the Huron National Forest. The township also includes Sturgeon Point State Park, which contains the historic Sturgeon Point Light Station along the coast of Lake Huron.

=== Major highways ===
- US 23 runs along the eastern portion of the township near Lake Huron.
- F-41 is a county-designated highway that runs along the western boundary of the township.

== Demographics ==
Historical population
Census	Pop.	Note	%±
1960	368		—
1970	416		13.0%
1980	569		36.8%
1990	549		−3.5%
2000	724		31.9%
2010	722		−0.3%
2020	653		−9.6%
Source: Census Bureau. Census 1960- 2000, 2010.

As of the census of 2000, there were 724 people, 308 households, and 230 families residing in the township. The population density was 20.7 inhabitants per square mile (8.0/km^{2}). There were 598 housing units at an average density of 17.1 per square mile (6.6/km^{2}). The racial makeup of the township was 98.34% White, 0.28% Native American, 0.14% Pacific Islander, and 1.24% from two or more races. Hispanic or Latino of any race were 0.41% of the population.

There were 308 households, out of which 24.4% had children under the age of 18 living with them, 64.6% were married couples living together, 7.1% had a female householder with no husband present, and 25.3% were non-families. 22.7% of all households were made up of individuals, and 12.3% had someone living alone who was 65 years of age or older. The average household size was 2.35 and the average family size was 2.71.

In the township the population was spread out, with 19.9% under the age of 18, 5.7% from 18 to 24, 19.3% from 25 to 44, 34.8% from 45 to 64, and 20.3% who were 65 years of age or older. The median age was 49 years. For every 100 females, there were 107.4 males. For every 100 females age 18 and over, there were 102.8 males.

The median income for a household in the township was $34,896, and the median income for a family was $39,750. Males had a median income of $32,125 versus $20,000 for females. The per capita income for the township was $20,279. About 5.0% of families and 6.9% of the population were below the poverty line, including 13.8% of those under age 18 and 5.0% of those age 65 or over.

== Education ==
Haynes Township is served entirely by Alcona Community Schools.
