= WXTF-LP =

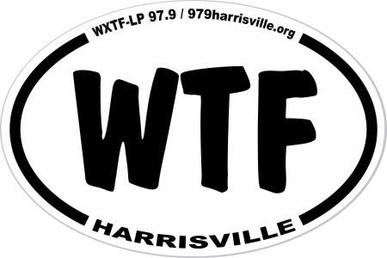
- Harrisville, Michigan; United States
- Broadcast area
- Frequency: 97.9 MHz
- Branding: WTF Radio

Programming
- Language: English
- Format: Community

Ownership
- Owner: Alcona Music Project, Inc.

History
- First air date: May 27, 2014

Technical information
- Licensing authority: FCC
- Facility ID: 193532
- Class: L1
- ERP: 100 watts
- HAAT: 29.5 meters (97 ft)
- Transmitter coordinates: 44°38′54″N 83°19′19″W

Links
- Public license information: LMS
- Website: 979harrisville.org

WXTF-LP (97.9 FM, "WTF Radio") is an American low-power broadcast radio station licensed to serve the community of Harrisville, Michigan. The station's broadcast license is held by the Alcona Music Project, Inc.

== Programming ==
The station's format is described as "Variety." Volunteers provide close to 100% of the programming - mostly music based. WXTF-LP works with the Alcona Community Schools offering guidance and air time for students interested in radio broadcasting. WXTF-LP provides local news and is The Sunrise Side's only broadcast outlet for Harry Shearer's "Le Show" program. In addition to a state-of-the-art air studio, WXTF-LP has a dedicated live performance studio, dubbed the "Playroom", where local musicians are invited to play.

WXTF-LP received its original construction permit from the Federal Communications Commission on January 15, 2014. The new station was assigned the WXTF-LP call sign by the FCC on January 23, 2014. WXTF-LP received its license to cover from the FCC on May 22, 2014, and was the first of the new LPFM applicants in Michigan to begin licensed broadcasting. The station counts May 27, 2014, as its first official day of broadcasting.

The station is staffed by volunteers and funded by local contributions.

Committed to being on air at least 12 hours per day, the station generally broadcasts between 8:00 a.m. and 9:00 p.m., though it sometimes is on the air longer.

In 2017, WXTF-LP moved to a new studio location along with its 50 foot (15 m) aerial, which overlooks the entrance to Harrisville Harbor. When this studio became unsuitable in 2021, the station ceased operations for a short time until a new location in downtown Harrisville was acquired in 2022 and operations resumed.

== See also ==
- List of community radio stations in the United States
