= Sturgeon Point Light =

Lighthouse in Michigan, United States

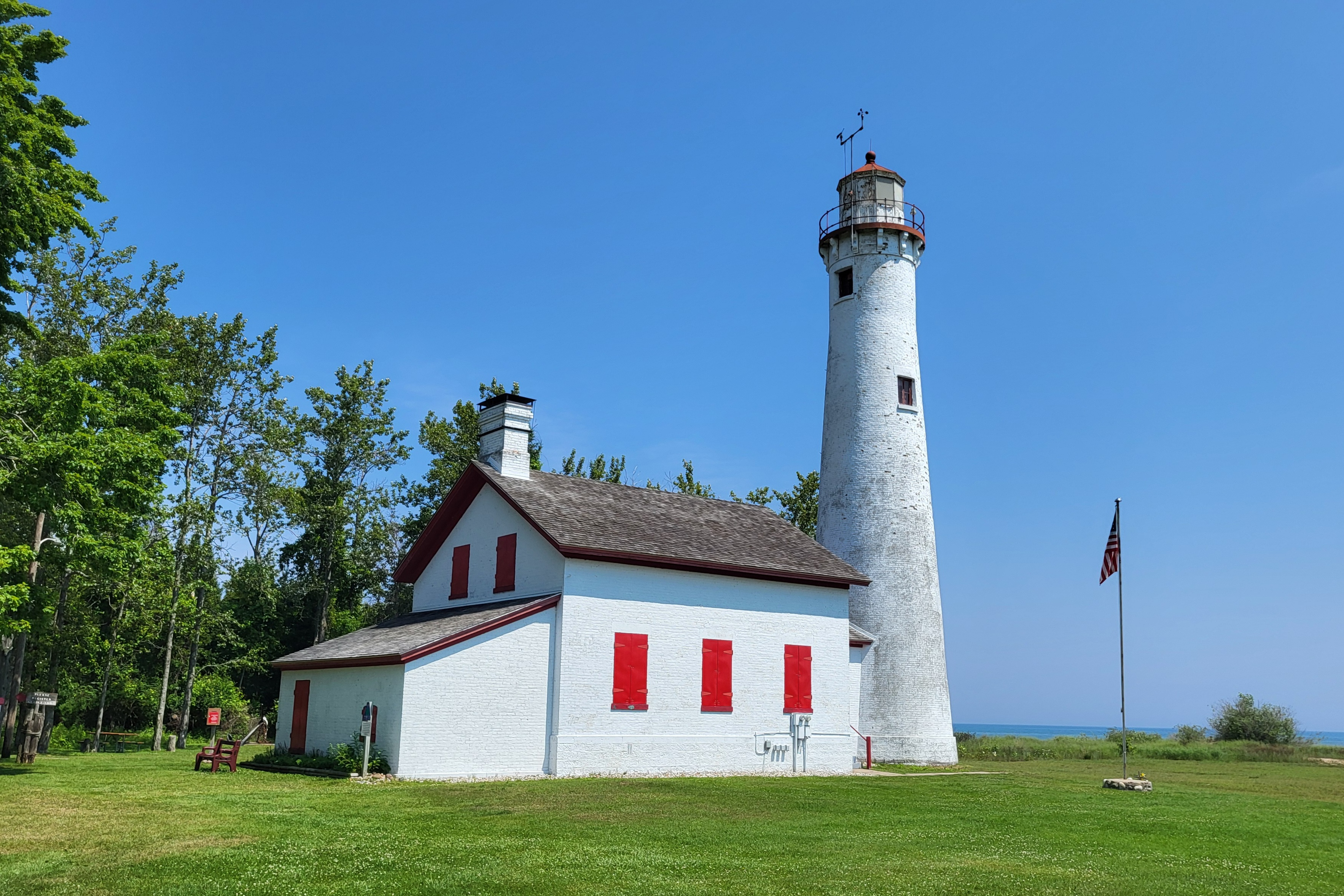
- Sturgeon Point Light in July 2025
- Location: Haynes Township, Alcona County, Michigan, USA
- Coordinates: 44°42′45.7″N 83°16′21.8″W

Tower
- Constructed: 1869
- Foundation: Limestone
- Construction: Brick
- Automated: 1939
- Height: 71 feet (22 m)
- Shape: Frustum of a cone
- Markings: white daymark with red trim
- Heritage: National Register of Historic Places listed place

Light
- First lit: 1869
- Focal height: 69 feet (21 m)
- Lens: Sixth order Fresnel Lens (original), 3½-order Fresnel Lens (current)
- Range: 9 nautical miles (17 km; 10 mi)
- Characteristic: flash every six seconds
- Sturgeon Point Light Station
- U.S. National Register of Historic Places
- Michigan State Historic Site
- Nearest city: Harrisville, Michigan
- Area: 1 acre (0.40 ha)
- Built: 1869
- Architect: United States Lighthouse Board
- Architectural style: Cape Cod style
- MPS: U.S. Coast Guard Lighthouses and Light Stations on the Great Lakes TR
- NRHP reference No.: 84001370

Significant dates
- Added to NRHP: July 19, 1984
- Designated MSHS: February 18, 1982

The Sturgeon Point Light Station is a lighthouse on Lake Huron in Haynes Township, Alcona County, in the northeastern part of Michigan's Lower Peninsula. Established to ward mariners off a reef that extends 1.5 miles (2.4 km) lakeward from Sturgeon Point, it is today regarded as a historic example of a Cape Cod style Great Lakes lighthouse.

== History ==
The light station was built in 1869 by the United States Lighthouse Board. The Board was in the midst of a lighthouse building boom on the Great Lakes due to increased maritime traffic, and in response to a large number of lost ships and men: Congress approved 70 lights on the western Great Lakes in thirty years: 28 in the 1850s, and 21 in each of the following decades. The location is roughly halfway between Alpena's Thunder Bay Island and the northern entry to Saginaw Bay. Importantly, this point sits atop a formidable reef that is an imminent hazard to navigation. Moreover, the area north of Sturgeon Point and south of Alcona, Michigan is a bay that can provide shelter from northerly and southerly winds and waves. Historically, this area is locally known as "Sanctuary Bay," which is in distinct contrast to "Misery Bay", the area to the north, between Alpena and Thunder Bay Island. The Lighthouse Board further recognized that being able to navigate close to (but not over) the reef and the point would aid transport into and out of Saginaw Bay.

It is made of brick masonry on an ashlar limestone foundation. The tower stands 70 feet 9 inches (21.56 m) in height, with a diameter of 16 feet (4.9 m) at the base. The focal plane is listed by the Coast Guard at 69 feet (21 m), which would be the height from the "mean high water mark," That figure is important, in that it could be used by mariners to chart their location, using a method of triangulation to give them the distance to the light. The adjoining, two-story Lighthouse keeper’s quarters was designed in the Cape Cod style and built of the same materials. At the time, the Board was often using this architectural motif. In fact, Poverty Island Light, built in 1874, is considered to be a "sibling" as it is a direct copy of Sturgeon Point.

The light was set to begin its service with a sixth-order Fresnel lens /freɪˈnɛl/ which was upgraded to a 3½-order lens (that was originally installed at Oswego, New York). It was one of only a dozen used around the country, most of which were on the Great Lakes. The other Great Lakes 3½-order lenses were at (in alphabetical order): DeTour Reef (two 3½-order lenses, after the bivalve lens broke), Eagle Bluff, Grays Reef, Huron Island, Michigan Island, St. Helena Island, and Toledo Harbor.

The lens at Sturgeon Point is without a doubt a third-and-a-half order lens. As Terry Pepper, executive director of the Great Lakes Lighthouse Keeper Association, wrote on August 6, 2012: "I have measured it personally."

As further proof, on July 22, 1870, the District Lampist visited the Station and made the following entry in his inspection journal:

"Sturgeon Point, No. 449 – This is a new station first lighted to the opening of navigation this spring. The illuminating apparatus consists of a 3 ½ Order Fresnel lens of 270°, Henry Lepaute maker, and is fitted with Funck’s hydraulic float lamps, showing a fixed white light. The illuminating apparatus was in excellent condition with the exception of one of the spare burners which had been damaged. It was taken on board for repairs. A spirit lamp to aid in heating the oil in severe cold weather is required."

However, for reasons unknown, there are conflicting reports as to the size of the present lens, with some reporting it as a third order, and orders as a 3½-order Fresnel lens.

The 3½-order Fresnel lens is still in place and was in use as of July 31, 2012. This is one of only 70 such Fresnel lenses that are still operational in the United States, sixteen of which are use on the Great Lakes, of which eight are in Michigan. (Note: "Fresnel Lenses Still in Operation" (PDF). United States Coast Guard. which reports that Sturgeon Point is the larger third order lens, not the somewhat smaller (and more rare) 3½-order See also, "Grosse Point Light study". Maritime Light Inventory. National Park Service. which disregards Sturgeon Point and Bete Grise Light (which has its original lens), and proffers a count of "four remaining lenses" -- it lists them -- on the Great Lakes. However, it appears to may be that the article is only intending to list lights that have "their original lens in situ"— "For example, on the Great Lakes, only three others besides Grosse Point have retained their Fresnel lenses in place since being installed: a fourth-order lens at Little Traverse Harbor, Michigan (1884), a third-order lens at Split Rock, Minnesota (1910), and a third-order lens at Presque Isle Light, Michigan (1871) {footnotes omitted.]"— and by that definition, Sturgeon Point is not on that list, as it has a larger replacement lens. According to the Life Saving Service's District Lampist, the upgrade occurred within the first year of operation, not in 1889 as indicated by some sources.)

In 1876, the light station was joined in its service by an adjacent United States Life-Saving Service station.

There is no question that the presence of this light on this highly dangerous reef has forestalled "countless accidents."

In 1875, a U.S. Life-Saving Service station was opened. The first light keeper became the first captain of the surf team.

In 1915, this station became part of the U.S. Coast Guard.

In 1939 the U.S. Lighthouse Service also merged under the control of the U.S. Coast Guard. In the same year the station was electrified and automated.

By the 1940s, the light was fully automated, and the Coast Guard withdrew all personnel in 1941 and thereafter dismantled the life-saving station. One source claims (erroneously) that the lifesaving saving station and the lighthouse were "abandoned" in the 1940s; in point of fact personnel were withdrawn, but the light remains an active aid to navigation to this day.

The lifesaving bell was stolen in 1951, and was "anonymously returned" in 2002 to the custody of the Alcona County Historical Society (according to a plaque at the light). The fog horn building was torn down. The brick outhouse, built in 1869, remains, however.

The Life Saving station's foundation is still visible. The lifesaving watch tower also was torn down.

In 1982 the Alcona Historical Society leased the light and began a three-years restoration project.

The keeper's house itself fell into disrepair until it was taken over by the Alcona Historical Society in 1982.

=== Historic context ===
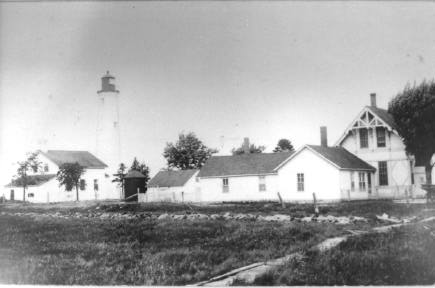
The light and United States Life-Saving Service station in approximately 1900–1910.

- At the time of the light station's construction, the Alcona County region hosted an active commercial fishery. Northern Michigan was also in the midst of a timber boom, during which wood products were shipped to markets over Lake Huron from nearby ports at Harrisville, Alcona, and Black River. Despite the later addition of agricultural produce to the cargoes shipped by lake from the region, by the early 20th century the Sturgeon Point Light primarily served passing vessels engaged in the bulk mineral trade, which did not stop at nearby ports.
- Sturgeon Point is one of over 150 past and present lighthouses in Michigan. Michigan has more lighthouses than any other state. See Lighthouses in the United States.
- Robert L. Bunting's book, Into Oblivion, chronicles the 1880 sinking of the passenger steamer Marine City near the ghost town of Alcona, Michigan, on Lake Huron. This well-researched work details the disaster, local history, and life in the lumber era, featuring illustrations by maritime artist Robert McGreevy and detailed interviews with locals.

Alcona and the Marine City are commemorated in Michigan historical marker L2223.

- In the Big Blow of 1913, two of three ships that had the most crew lost, 28 victims each, were thereafter reported to have gone down in the area near Sturgeon Point. Those ships are the John A. McGean and the Isaac M. Scott. See also, Shipwrecks of the 1913 Great Lakes storm and List of victims of the 1913 Great Lakes storm. However, the better evidence suggests that the McGean is in fact 9.5 miles (15.3 km) due east of Harbor Beach, Michigan, which is on the east side of Michigan's Thumb. The Scott was first discovered in 1976, and is lying on the bottom about 7.5 miles (12.1 km) northeast of Thunder Bay Island.

== Contemporary status ==
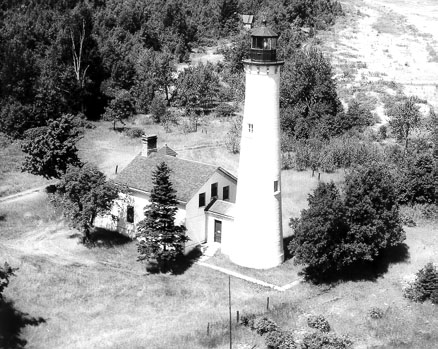
Undated aerial image by USCG

Ownership was transferred from the Coast Guard to the Michigan Department of Natural Resources under the terms of the National Historic Lighthouse Preservation Act, and operations are maintained by the Alcona Historical Society. The site is part of the Sturgeon Point State Park under the auspices of the Michigan DNR.

During the planning stages of the Thunder Bay National Marine Sanctuary, the Sturgeon Point Light was proposed to mark the southernmost extent of the sanctuary, although the final sanctuary boundary was drawn short of the light. Nevertheless, 15 historic shipwrecks have been identified with place of loss listed as "Sturgeon Point". Indeed, the question of expanding the National Sanctuary and Underwater Preserve continues to be a subject of inquiry and discussion.

Although the United States Coast Guard continues to operate the light, the property has been transferred to the Michigan Department of Natural Resources under the terms of the National Historic Lighthouse Preservation Act. The transfer from the Department of the interior was effective May 2005. The Alcona Historical Society operates a museum in the restored historic buildings. The Sturgeon Point Light was added to the National Register of Historic Places in 1984. Sturgeon Point, on which the lighthouse is built, is a Michigan Scenic Site overseen by the Michigan Department of Natural Resources. It is listed as part of the National Maritime Heritage Program with the National Park Service. The station structure is also listed as a state historic site in February 1982.

Additionally, it is on the National Register of Historic Places, Reference #84001370, Name of Listing: STURGEON POINT LIGHT STATION (U.S. COAST GUARD/GREAT LAKES TR) and is also on the state inventory, being listed in 1969.

In 2006, the U.S. Coast Guard sought to forever darken the light, and in fact shut it off for a short time. Resistance to the initiative developed, and over five thousand signatures were collected on petitions to "Save Our Light." Numerous public comments were submitted as part of the regulatory process. In due course, an arrangement was made whereby the light was left on (albeit with its operating expenses to be paid by the Alcona County Historical Society) and it was designated as an official "seasonal private aid to navigation." from April 1 through November 1. The Coast Guard reversed course after the public pressure, and after the intervention of Senator Debbie Stabenow and the fresnel lens and the light remained on through July 2012.

A transfer of ownership of the light itself, from the Coast Guard to the Michigan Department of Natural Resources, is still languishing as of 2012 under the terms of the National Historic Lighthouse Preservation Act. The Alcona County Historical Society is a lessee at this time.

Because of its picturesque form and location, it is often the subject of photographs, paintings, drawings, and even of needlepoint illustrations. In fact, it is also the setting of an illustrated children's storybook.

The site supports sea grasses in many forms, goldenrod, Queen-Anne's lace, yarrow, and wild strawberry. Gulls, cormorant, killdeer, loons are frequent visitors, along with bald eagles that make their home on the bay.

The following contact information may be of use to travelers: Sturgeon Point Lighthouse & Maritime Museum Sturgeon Point Road Harrisville, MI 48740 (989) 724-5107

== Current events at the lighthouse and museum ==
- The lighthouse is located in Sturgeon Point State Park, a Michigan state park.
- The lighthouse is maintained and operated by the Alcona Historical Society, a private organization that funds the maintenance and operation with few public funds. The Society is in the process of raising contributions to renovate and paint the lighthouse.
- The tower is regularly open during the summer for climbing by the public (for a small fee to cover insurance costs). The museum is open to the public, and is supported by donations.
- On the grounds is the Old Bailey School, a 1907 One-room school house, which was moved there from Mikado, Michigan in 1998.
- A strawberry social is held at the Bailey School on the last Sunday of June (adjacent to the lighthouse) to raise funds for the Alcona Historical Society.
- The annual Sturgeon Point Light Station Sanctuary Bay sail boat race, which also has a local picnic, is also a fundraiser for the Alcona County Historical Society. It is regularly held on the first Saturday in August, and is a handicapped race for day sailors of all classes. The course is two times around a triangular 6 mile (9.2 kilometer) course in Sanctuary Bay, the area between Sturgeon Point Light and Alcona.
- Michigan is the only state that supports lighthouse preservation with a program that includes annual grants from the state to local preservation groups. Consequently, there are many organizations and their volunteers working hard to save and restore lighthouses. The Michigan Lighthouse Conservancy is a state preservation society, and the Great Lakes Lighthouse Keepers Association is based in the state. The Alcona County Historical Society is in the process of collecting $70,000.00 for renovation (particularly brick work and painting) of its light, half of which is being funded by the state of Michigan. The White Shoal light is the prominent design element—used by the State of Michigan as an icon to generate revenue—on its Save Our Lights, Michigan License Plate.

== See also ==
- Lighthouses in the United States
