= Harrisville, Michigan =

- City
- City of Harrisville
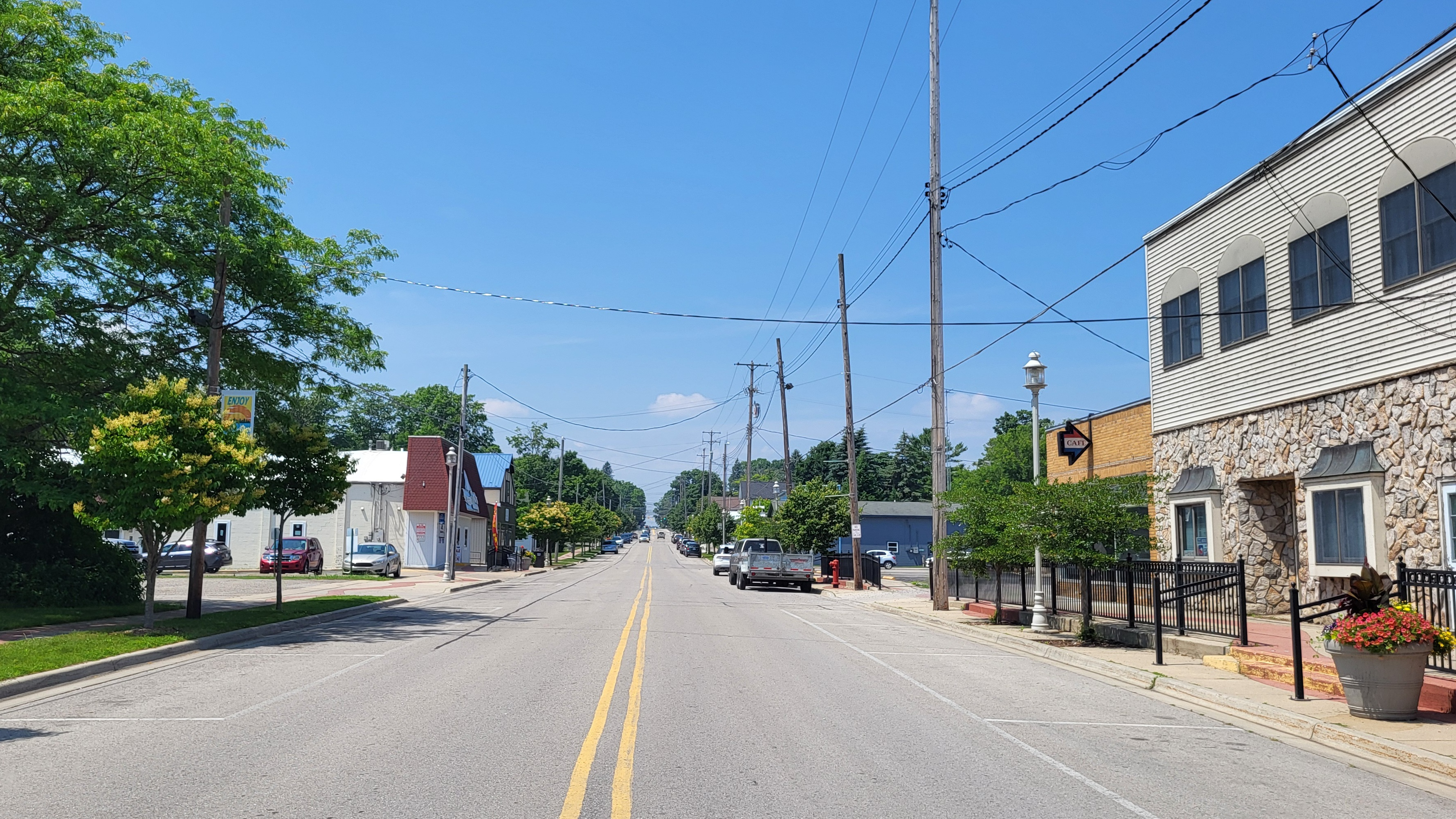
- Looking west along East Main Street

- Logo

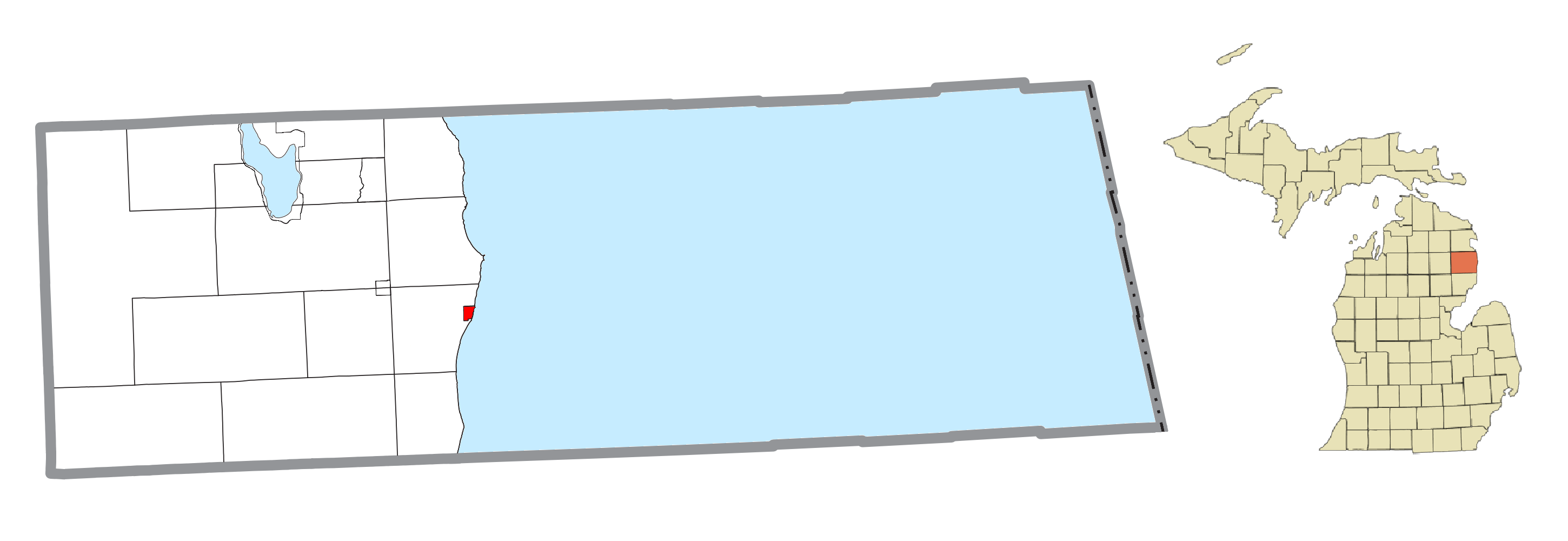
- Location within Alcona County

- Location within the state of Michigan Location within the United States
- Coordinates: 44°39′28″N 83°17′41″W
- Country: United States
- State: Michigan
- County: Alcona
- Platted: 1870
- Incorporated: 1887 (village); 1905 (city)

Government
  - Mayor: Jeffrey Gehring

Area
  - Total: 0.63 sq mi (1.64 km^{2})
  - Land: 0.63 sq mi (1.64 km^{2})
  - Water: 0 sq mi (0.00 km^{2})
- Elevation: 620 ft (190 m)

Population (2020)
  - Total: 437
  - Density: 691.3/sq mi (266.92/km^{2})
- Time zone: UTC-5 (EST)
  - Summer (DST): UTC-4 (EDT)
- ZIP code: 48740
- Area code: 989
- FIPS code: 26-36860
- GNIS feature ID: 0627866
- Website: harrisvillemi.org

Harrisville is a city in the U.S. state of Michigan and the county seat of Alcona County. The population was 437 at the 2020 census, making Harrisville the sixth-smallest city by population in the state of Michigan. The city is surrounded by Harrisville Township but is administratively autonomous. Located on Lake Huron, it is an official Michigan Department of Natural Resources Harbor of Refuge.

== History ==
The place was first known as Davison's Mill after Crosier Davison, who in partnership with Simeon Holden, had purchased land and water power rights here in 1854. Benjamin Harris and his sons, Levi and Henry, of West Bloomfield, New York, bought out the partners. A post office established on September 16, 1857, was named Harrisville, with Levi as the first postmaster.

The Harrises sold out to Weston, (George L.) Colwell & Company, who had H.G. Rothwell plat the community in 1870. Harrisville was incorporated as a village in 1887 and as a city in 1905.

In 1908, the town narrowly survived in the shadow of the Metz Fire, the largest modern forest fire in Michigan. It was the beneficiary of an onshore wind.

Pizer's Variety Store, originally The White Store, was at the corner of Lake Street and Main Street.

Ki Cuyler's Bar was a long time popular landmark which burnt in 2018. The building was torn down.

== Geography ==
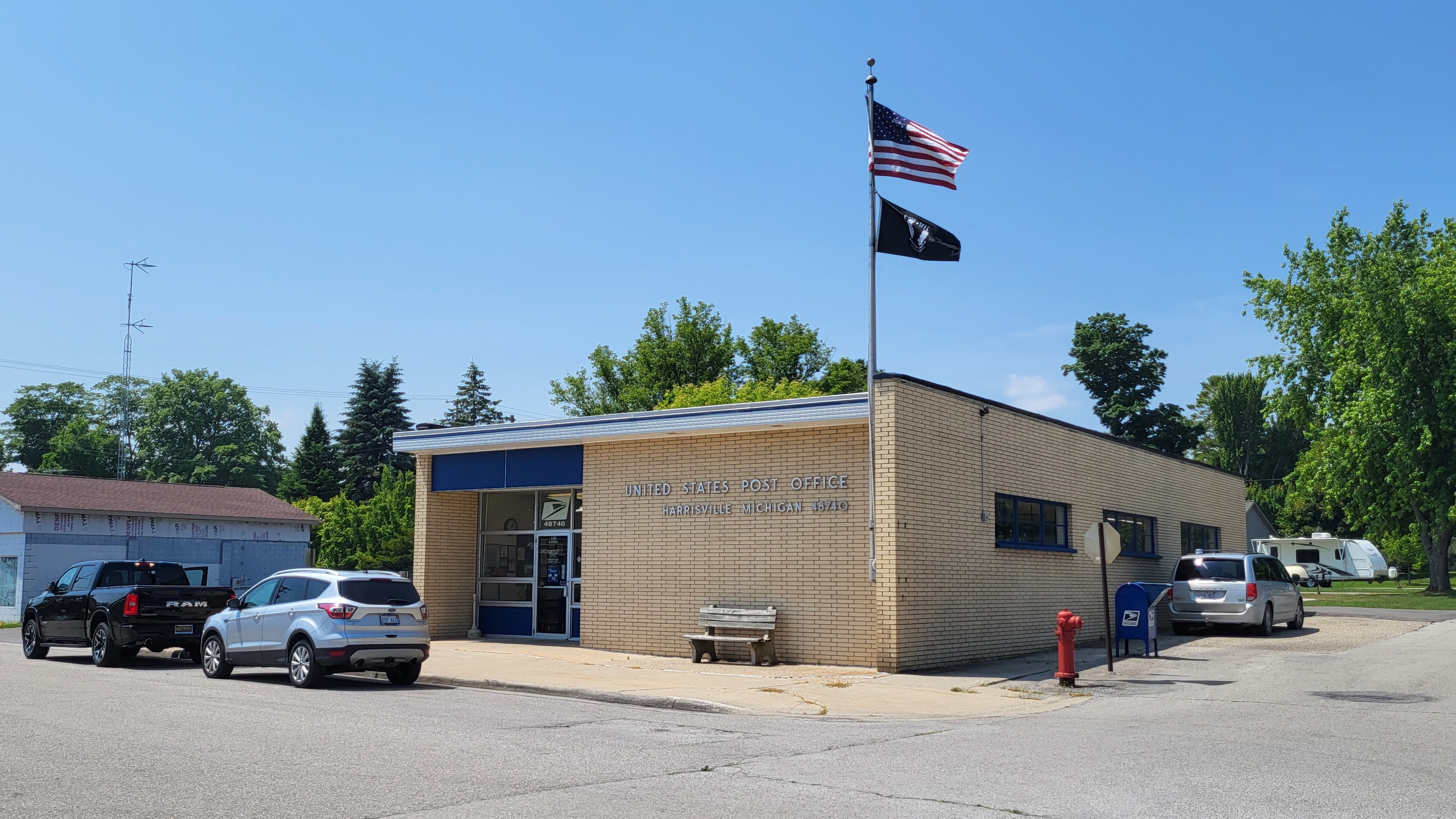
U.S. Post Office in Harrisville

According to the United States Census Bureau, the city has a total area of 0.61 square miles (1.58 km^{2}), all land. It is considered to be part of Northern Michigan.

The city is on the western shore of Lake Huron and has a harbor for recreational boaters. The harbor is a center for salmon and trout fishing. It is also a designated "Harbor of Refuge" on Lake Huron by the United States Coast Guard. The town also boasts Harrisville State Park, which includes a wooded campground along the beach. Sturgeon Point Light, a lighthouse and museum, is a few miles to the north, and is open to the public.

Harrisville is on the edge of Huron National Forest, which offers outdoor recreational opportunities such as hunting, swimming, cross-country skiing and trout fishing. The forest contains 330 miles (530 km) of hiking trails. The Huron and Manistee National Forests were separately designated but were combined in 1945 for administrative purposes.

The Lake Huron beaches in and around Harrisville (including two state parks) have been recognized as being among the "top ten in Michigan." "Old-fashioned lake vacations abound on this pretty stretch of Lake Huron."

Harrisville is situated along the Lake State Railway, formerly the Detroit and Mackinac Railway (D&M). The 1901 D&M passenger depot is made of stone, which makes it one of two along the railway (the other being in Standish). As of 2023, it is privately maintained by local citizens as part of the municipality's historical legacy.

=== Climate ===
Climate data for Harrisville (MI)
Month	Jan	Feb	Mar	Apr	May	Jun	Jul	Aug	Sep	Oct	Nov	Dec	Year
Mean daily maximum °F (°C)	27 (−3)	30 (−1)	37 (3)	48 (9)	59 (15)	69 (21)	76 (24)	75 (24)	68 (20)	56 (13)	43 (6)	32 (0)	52 (11)
Mean daily minimum °F (°C)	14 (−10)	14 (−10)	22 (−6)	33 (1)	43 (6)	53 (12)	59 (15)	58 (14)	51 (11)	40 (4)	31 (−1)	20 (−7)	37 (2)
Average precipitation inches (mm)	1.36 (35)	1.20 (30)	1.72 (44)	2.64 (67)	3.16 (80)	3.34 (85)	3.63 (92)	3.43 (87)	3.55 (90)	2.62 (67)	2.19 (56)	1.80 (46)	30.64 (779)
Average snowfall inches (cm)	15 (38)	12 (30)	8 (20)	2 (5.1)	0 (0)	0 (0)	0 (0)	0 (0)	0 (0)	2 (5.1)	14 (36)	14 (36)	67 (170.2)
Source: US Climate Data

== Demographics ==
Historical population
Census	Pop.	Note	%±
1880	549		—
1890	987		79.8%
1900	403		−59.2%
1910	444		10.2%
1920	460		3.6%
1930	438		−4.8%
1940	437		−0.2%
1950	485		11.0%
1960	487		0.4%
1970	541		11.1%
1980	559		3.3%
1990	470		−15.9%
2000	514		9.4%
2010	493		−4.1%
2020	437		−11.4%
Source: Census Bureau. Census 1960- 2000, 2010.

=== 2022 American Community Survey ===
As of the 2022 American Community Survey estimates, there were 500 people and 225 households. The population density was 791.1 inhabitants per square mile (305.4/km^{2}). There were 347 housing units at an average density of 549.1 per square mile (212.0/km^{2}). The racial makeup of the city was 97.6% White and 0.2% Black or African American, with 2.2% from two or more races. Hispanics or Latinos of any race were 6.2% of the population.

Of the 225 households, 22.2% had children under the age of 18 living with them, 60.4% had seniors 65 years or older living with them, 42.2% were married couples living together, 5.3% were couples cohabitating, 13.3% had a male householder with no partner present, and 39.1% had a female householder with no partner present. The median household size was 2.04 and the median family size was 2.68.

The age distribution was 17.6% under 18, 4.4% from 18 to 24, 22.2% from 25 to 44, 19.6% from 45 to 64, and 36.2% who were 65 or older. The median age was 54.1 years.

The median income for a household was $35,375, with family households having a median income of $58,333 and non-family households $28,438. The per capita income was $26,803. Out of the 473 people with a determined poverty status, 23.3% were below the poverty line. Further, 36.0% of minors and 18.8% of seniors were below the poverty line.

In the survey, residents self-identified with various ethnic ancestries. People of English descent made up 25.8% of the population of the town, followed by German at 22.6%, Irish at 21.8%, Polish at 9.2%, Scottish at 6.4%, American at 6.2%, French at 6.0%, Czech at 5.0%, Italian at 4.0%, Dutch at 3.0%, French Canadian at 3.0%, Norwegian at 2.2%, Swedish at 1.6%, Hungarian at 1.0%, and Greek at 0.6%.

=== 2010 census ===
As of the census of 2010, there were 493 people, 231 households, and 130 families residing in the city. The population density was 808.2 inhabitants per square mile (312.0/km^{2}). There were 329 housing units at an average density of 539.3 units per square mile (208.2 units/km^{2}). The racial makeup of the city was 96.6% White, 0.6% African American, 1.0% Native American, 0.2% Asian, 0.6% from other races, and 1.0% from two or more races. Hispanic or Latino of any race were 2.4% of the population.

There were 231 households, of which 18.2% had children under the age of 18 living with them, 42.4% were married couples living together, 11.7% had a female householder with no husband present, 2.2% had a male householder with no wife present, and 43.7% were non-families. 38.5% of all households were made up of individuals, and 20.3% had someone living alone who was 65 years of age or older. The average household size was 1.96 and the average family size was 2.55.

The median age in the city was 51.6 years. 16.4% of residents were under the age of 18; 5% were between the ages of 18 and 24; 20.2% were from 25 to 44; 29% were from 45 to 64; and 29.6% were 65 years of age or older. The gender makeup of the city was 45.0% male and 55.0% female.

=== 2000 census ===
As of the census of 2000, there were 514 people, 239 households, and 131 families residing in the city. The population density was 831.2 inhabitants per square mile (320.9/km^{2}). There were 327 housing units at an average density of 528.8 units per square mile (204.2 units/km^{2}). The racial makeup of the city was 94.94% White, 2.14% African American, 0.39% Native American, 0.97% Asian, and 1.56% from two or more races. Hispanic or Latino of any race were 0.97% of the population.

There were 239 households, out of which 18.4% had children under the age of 18 living with them, 44.4% were married couples living together, 8.4% had a female householder with no husband present, and 44.8% were non-families. 41.4% of all households were made up of individuals, and 22.6% had someone living alone who was 65 years of age or older. The average household size was 1.92 and the average family size was 2.57.

In the city, the population was spread out, with 16.0% under the age of 18, 7.4% from 18 to 24, 21.6% from 25 to 44, 25.9% from 45 to 64, and 29.2% who were 65 years of age or older. The median age was 48 years. For every 100 females, there were 96.2 males. For every 100 females age 18 and over, there were 93.7 males.

The median income for a household in the city was $27,500, and the median income for a family was $34,286. Males had a median income of $23,625 versus $21,875 for females. The per capita income for the city was $16,983. About 9.3% of families and 13.6% of the population were below the poverty line, including 20.8% of those under age 18 and 6.5% of those age 65 or over.

== Transportation ==
=== Major highways ===
- US 23, north of Standish, it has been designated the Sunrise Side Coastal Highway, and runs along the Lake Huron shoreline. US 23 is the most proximate connector to I-75, to which it connects in Standish, about 75 miles (121 km) to the south. About 135 miles (217 km) to the north is Mackinaw City and the Mackinac Bridge and the north end of the lower peninsula's I-75.
- M-72 In 1936, downtown Harrisville became the eastern terminus of the 133-mile (214 km) M-72, which runs across the lower peninsula from Empire. It is one of three true cross-peninsular highways.

=== Bus ===
- Indian Trails provides daily intercity bus service between St. Ignace and Bay City, Michigan.

=== Airport ===
Harrisville Airport is 2,200 feet (670 m) in length; it is located on Walker Road about a mile northwest of the city. A much larger public airport that serves the area and has nearly all weather capability is Oscoda–Wurtsmith Airport.

== Local events ==
Every Labor Day weekend, Harrisville hosts the Harmony Weekend (formerly known as the Barbershop festival), which includes a large craft fair. Harrisville is also home to the famous Glenview Clydesdales.

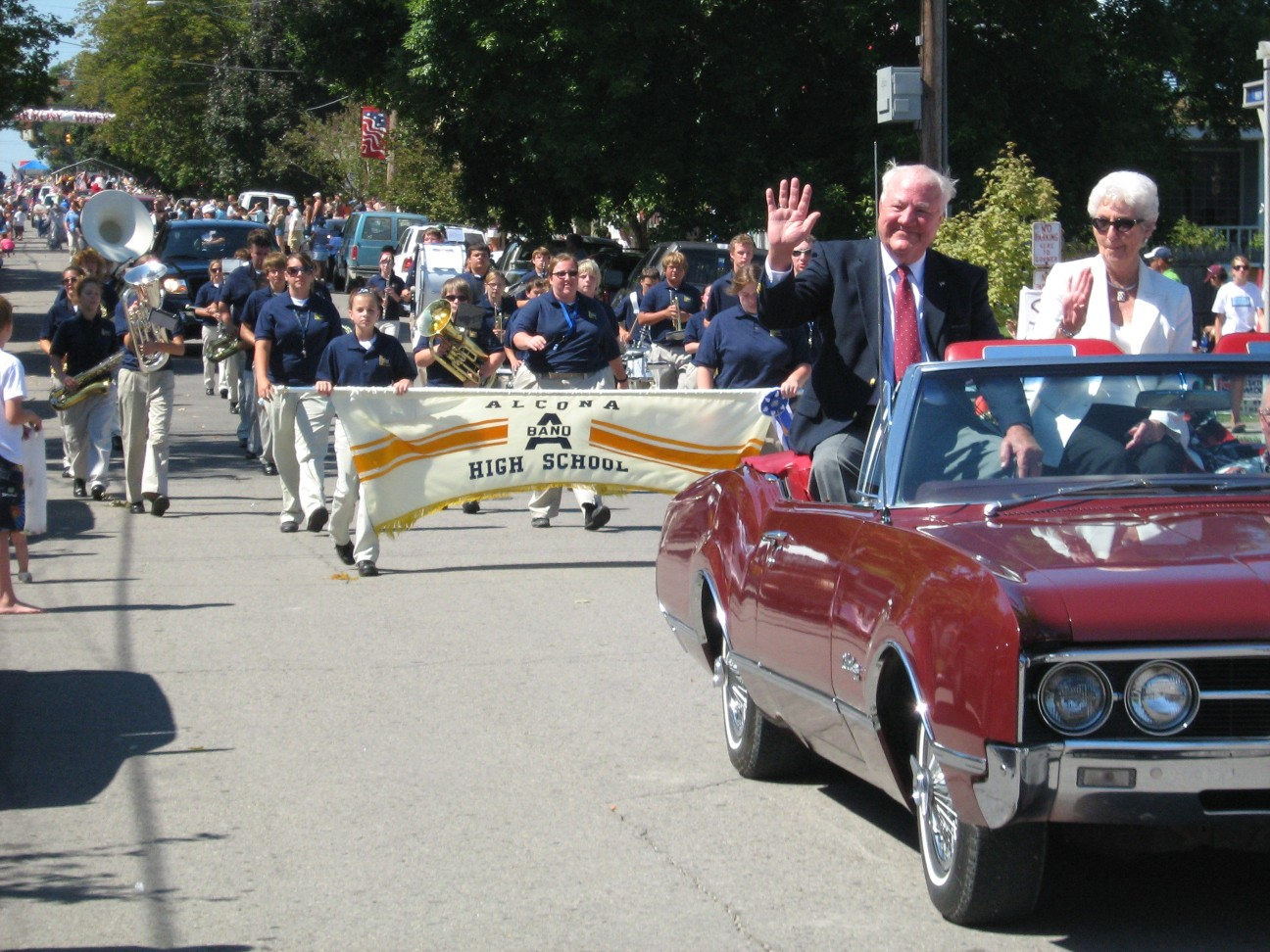
Harmony Weekend 2007, Parade

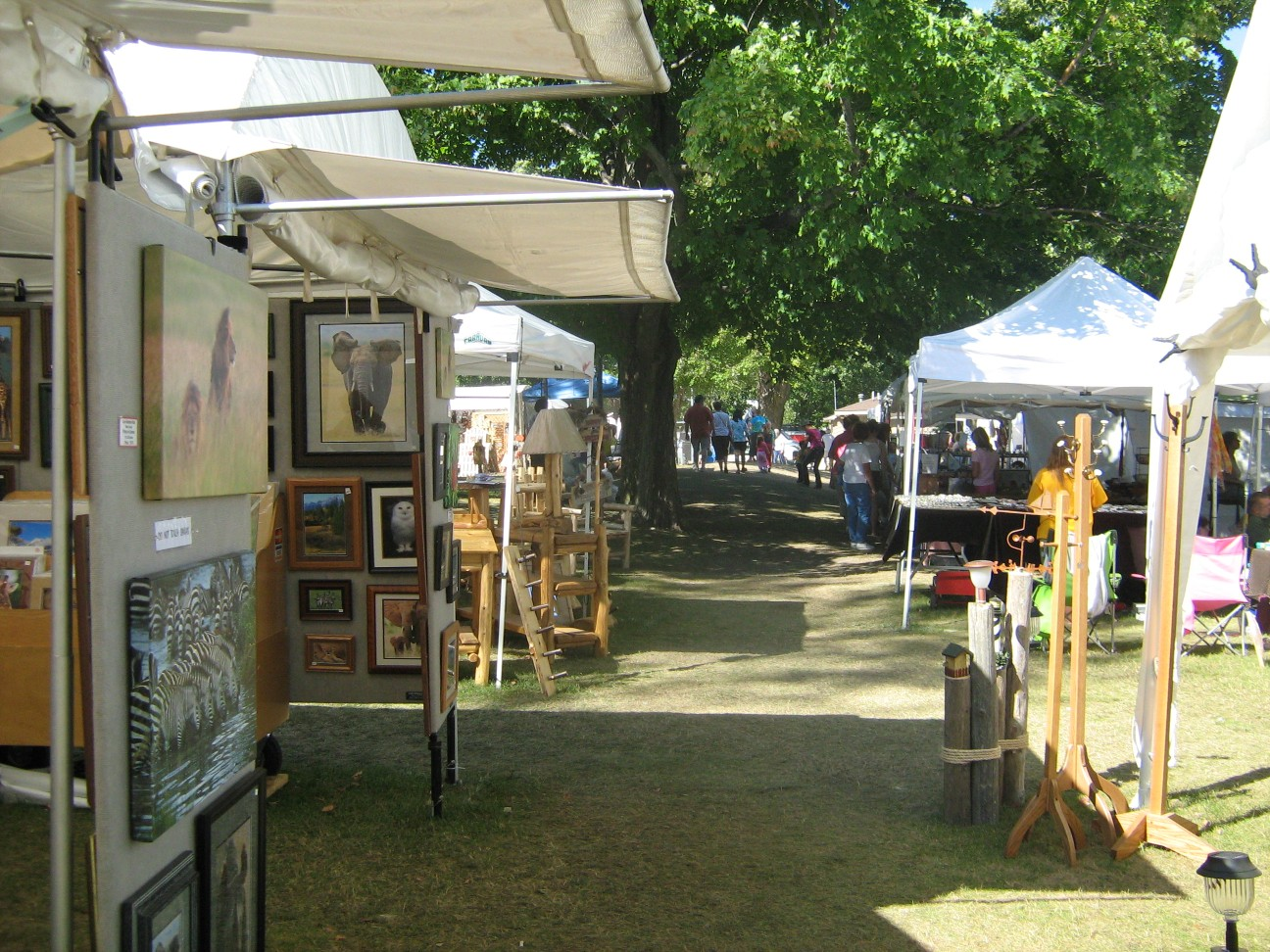
Harmony Weekend 2007, Craft Show

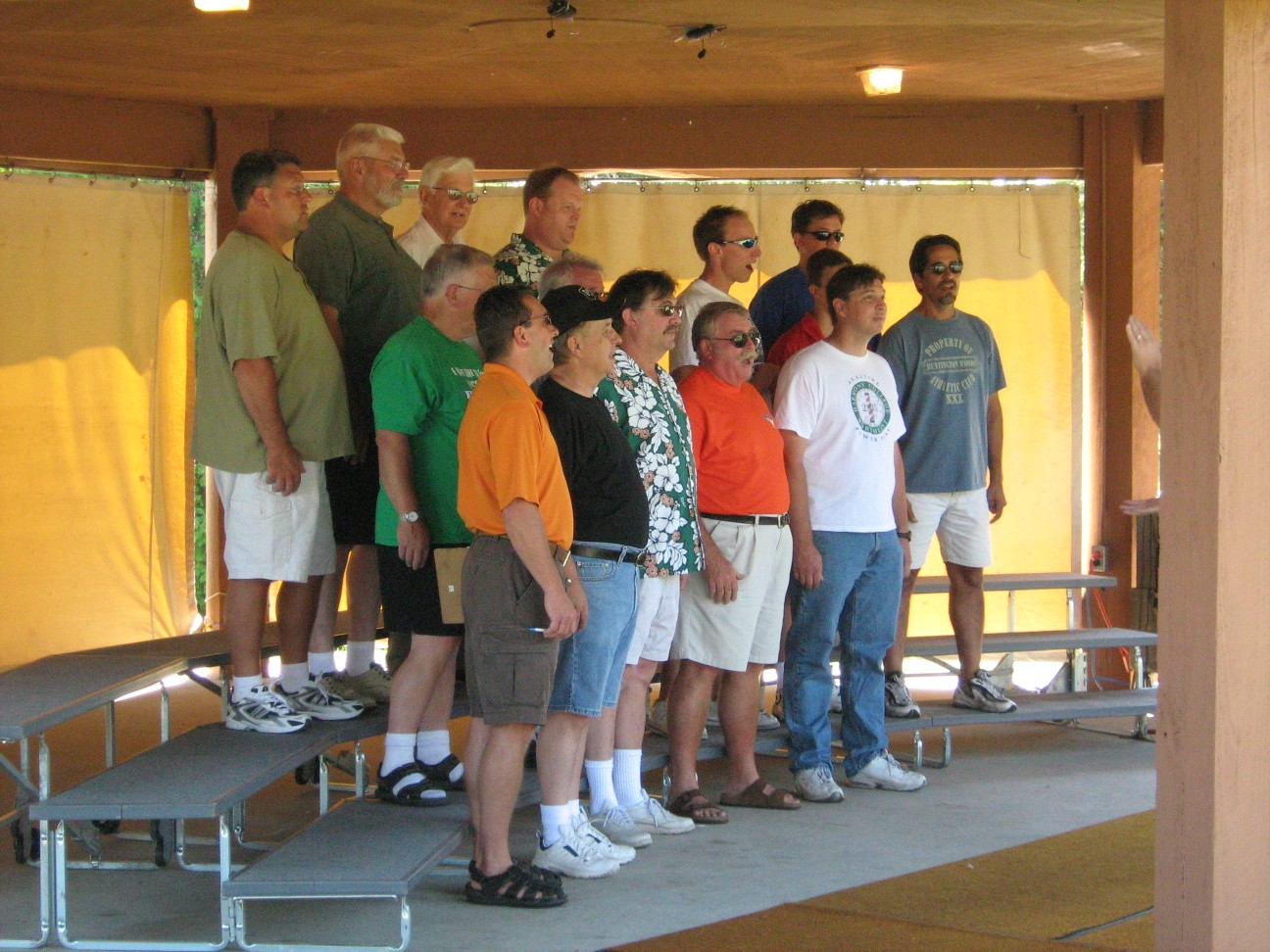
Harmony Weekend 2007, Men's Full Chorus

== Government ==
The following is a list of elected officials of Harrisville, as of December 2025:

- Mayor: Jeff Gehring (R)
- Clerk:Barbara Pierce (D)
- Treasurer: Barbara Luenberger (R)
- Alderman Ward I: Michael Bean (D)
- Alderman Ward I: Nancy McKenzie (NPA)
- Alderman Ward II: Kari Vandereuel (NPA)
- Alderman Ward II: Timothy Claseman (R)
- Alderman Ward III: Jacquelyn Schwanz (D)
- Alderman Ward III: Thomas Mason
- Zoning Administrator: John Moran

== Notable residents ==
- John T. Frederick, buried in Harrisville, professor of English literature University of Notre Dame and author many books including Green Bush.
- Kiki Cuyler, Hall of Fame baseball player. He is memorialized on a section of M-72 and in a local baseball field.

== Media ==
=== Newspapers ===
- The Alcona County Review, located in Harrisville, is the newspaper of record, and has served the community since 1877.
- The Alpena News is the daily newspaper of record for much of northeastern Lower Peninsula of Michigan.
- Daily editions of the Detroit Free Press and The Detroit News are also available throughout the area.

=== Radio ===
- WSFP
- WXTF-LP
