= Harrisville Township, Michigan =

- Civil township
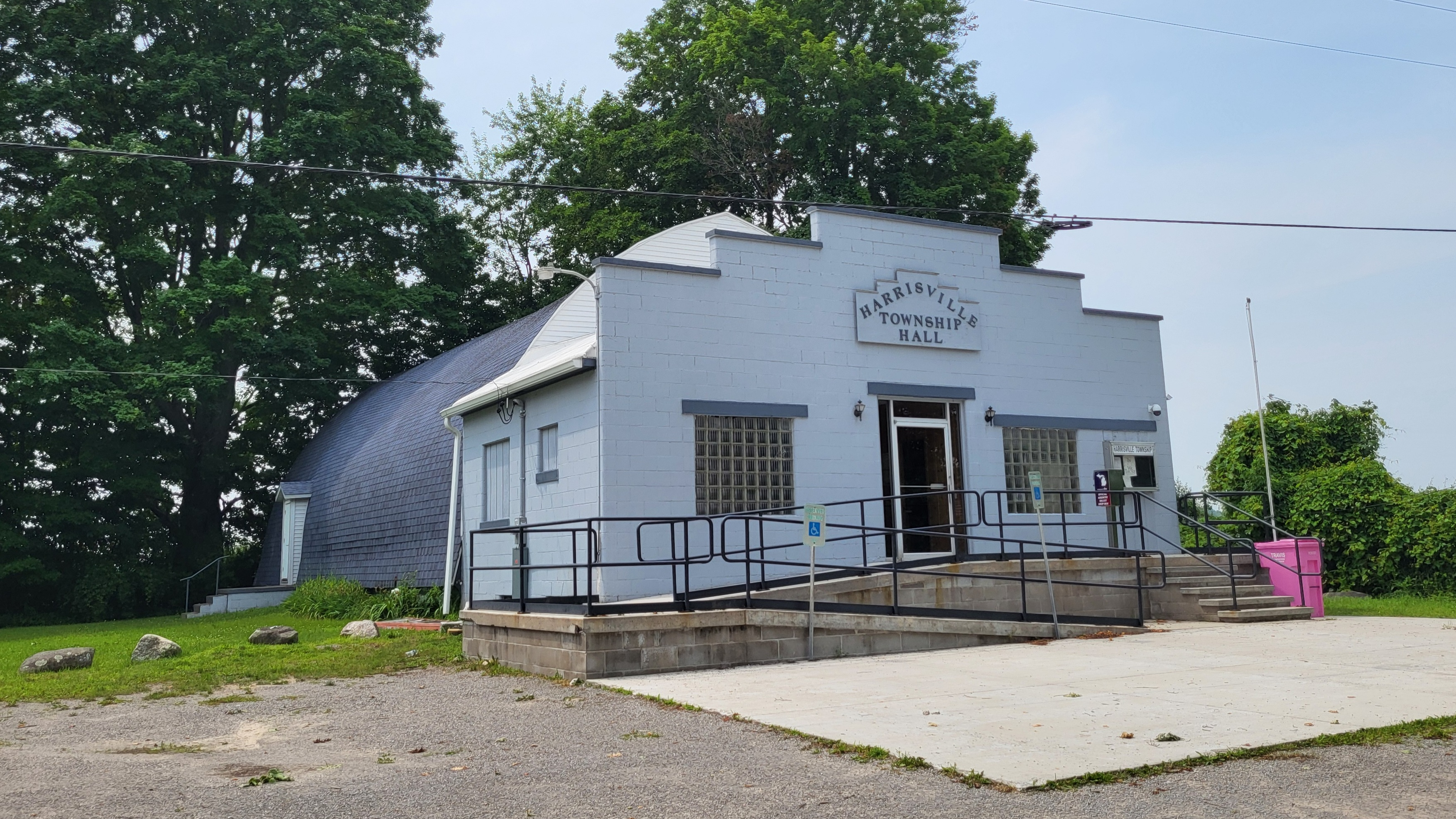
- Harrisville Township Hall

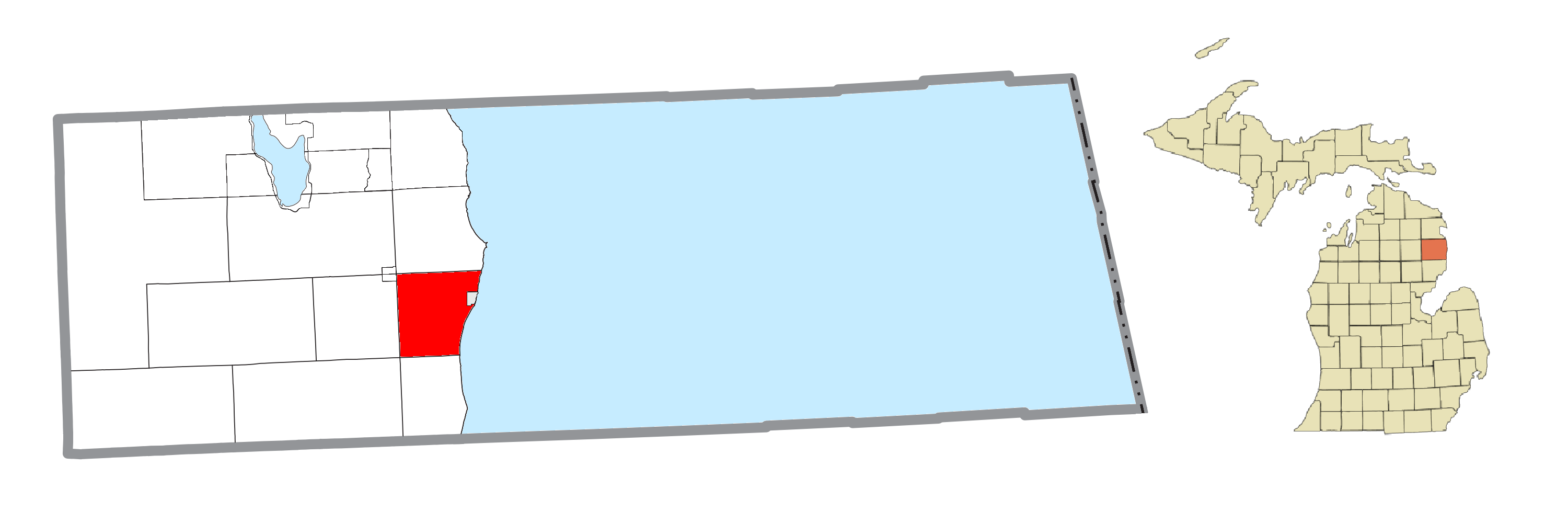
- Location within Alcona County

- Location within the state of Michigan Location within the United States
- Coordinates: 44°39′10″N 83°20′00″W
- Country: United States
- State: Michigan
- County: Alcona
- Established: 1859

Government
  - Supervisor: Charles Spitznagel
  - Clerk: Kaylie Landrum

Area
  - Total: 30.35 sq mi (78.6 km^{2})
  - Land: 30.33 sq mi (78.6 km^{2})
  - Water: 0.02 sq mi (0.052 km^{2})
- Elevation: 728 ft (222 m)

Population (2020)
  - Total: 1,307
  - Density: 43.09/sq mi (16.64/km^{2})
- Time zone: UTC-5 (Eastern (EST))
  - Summer (DST): UTC-4 (EDT)
- ZIP code(s): 48738 (Greenbush); 48740 (Harrisville); 48745 (Mikado)
- Area code: 989
- FIPS code: 26-36880
- GNIS feature ID: 1626441
- Website: Official website

Harrisville Township is a civil township of Alcona County in the U.S. state of Michigan. The population was 1,307 at the 2020 census. Harrisville Township surrounds the city of Harrisville, but the two are administered autonomously.

== Communities ==
- Springport is an unincorporated community located along U.S. Route 23 on the shores of Lake Huron at 44°38′08″N 83°18′20″W. The Holden family settled in the area after their boat blew ashore in 1846. In 1865, the community grew when Joseph Van Buskirk built a store and mill. It was first called Sunflower Hill but was also referred to as South Harrisville due to its proximity to Harrisville. It was later known as Springport due to the numerous coldsprings in the area.

== Geography ==
According to the U.S. Census Bureau, the township has a total area of 30.35 square miles (78.61 km^{2}), of which 30.33 square miles (78.55 km^{2}) is land and 0.02 square miles (0.05 km^{2}) (0.07%) is water.

Harrisville Township has a coastline along Lake Huron, and most of Harrisville State Park is located within the township and extends into the city of Harrisville.

=== Major highways ===
- US 23 runs along the eastern portion of the township near Lake Huron.
- M-72 runs west–east through the center of the township into the city of Harrisville.

== Demographics ==
Historical population
Census	Pop.	Note	%±
1960	787		—
1970	902		14.6%
1980	1,093		21.2%
1990	1,315		20.3%
2000	1,411		7.3%
2010	1,348		−4.5%
2020	1,307		−3.0%
Source: Census Bureau. Census 1960- 2000, 2010.

As of the census of 2000, there were 1,411 people, 555 households, and 405 families residing in the township. The population density was 46.7 inhabitants per square mile (18.0/km^{2}). There were 790 housing units at an average density of 26.1 per square mile (10.1/km^{2}). The racial makeup of the township was 98.72% White, 0.35% Native American, and 0.92% from two or more races. Hispanic or Latino of any race were 0.64% of the population.

There were 555 households, out of which 25.0% had children under the age of 18 living with them, 62.2% were married couples living together, 6.8% had a female householder with no husband present, and 27.0% were non-families. 22.5% of all households were made up of individuals, and 11.4% had someone living alone who was 65 years of age or older. The average household size was 2.37 and the average family size was 2.74.

In the township the population was spread out, with 20.4% under the age of 18, 6.0% from 18 to 24, 20.8% from 25 to 44, 28.6% from 45 to 64, and 24.2% who were 65 years of age or older. The median age was 47 years. For every 100 females, there were 90.7 males. For every 100 females age 18 and over, there were 91.3 males.

The median income for a household in the township was $35,074, and the median income for a family was $36,685. Males had a median income of $28,500 versus $20,588 for females. The per capita income for the township was $15,907. About 7.8% of families and 9.9% of the population were below the poverty line, including 10.8% of those under age 18 and 6.9% of those age 65 or over.

== Education ==
Harrisville Township is served entirely by Alcona Community Schools.
