= Douglas House =

Douglas House may refer to:

== Buildings ==
=== in England ===
- Douglas House, Petersham, Richmond, London
- Douglas House, Westminster, London, a U.S. servicemen's club

=== in Scotland ===
- An alternative name for Douglas Castle

=== in the United States ===
- Walter Douglas House, Bisbee, Arizona
- Lewis Douglas House, Phoenix, Arizona, listed on the NRHP
- Douglas House (Vaughn, Arkansas)
- J. O. Douglas House, Dunedin, Florida
- Smith and Douglas Family Houses, Cassville, Georgia, listed on the NRHP
- George B. Douglas House, Cedar Rapids, Iowa
- C. F. Douglas House, Norridgewock, Maine
- Bennink-Douglas Cottages, Cambridge, Massachusetts
- James and Jean Douglas House, Friendship Township, Michigan
- Douglas House (Harbor Springs, Michigan)
- Douglas House (Lovells Township, Michigan)
- Douglas House (Sontag, Mississippi), listed on the NRHP
- Douglas House (Florissant, Missouri), listed on the NRHP
- Douglas House (Omaha), Nebraska
- S. M. Douglas House, Mansfield, Ohio, listed on the NRHP
- H. T. Douglas Mansion and Garage, Shawnee, Oklahoma, listed on the NRHP
- John S. Douglas House, Uniontown, Pennsylvania
- George Douglas House, North Kingstown, Rhode Island
- Hugh Bright Douglas House, Fayetteville, Tennessee, listed on the NRHP
- Hiram Douglas House, Ooltewah, Tennessee, listed on the NRHP
- John B. and Ketura (Kettie) Douglas House, Tyler, Texas, listed on the NRHP

== Other ==
- House of Douglas, a collective name for the leading branches of Clan Douglas

== See also ==
- Douglass House (disambiguation)
