= Douglass House =

Douglass House may refer to:

- James S. and Melquides E. Douglass House, Florence, Arizona, listed on the National Register of Historic Places (NRHP) in Pinal County, Arizona
- Douglass Summer House, Highland Beach, Maryland, listed on the NRHP in Anne Arundel County, Maryland
- Alfred Douglass House, Brookline, Massachusetts, listed on the NRHP in Norfolk County, Massachusetts
- Douglass House (Houghton, Michigan), listed on the NRHP in Houghton County, Michigan
- Robert L. Douglass House, Fallon, Nevada, listed on the NRHP in Churchill County, Nevada
- Douglass House (Trenton, New Jersey), listed on the NRHP in Mercer County, New Jersey
- John Douglass House, Kirkwood, Pennsylvania, listed on the NRHP in Lancaster County, Pennsylvania
- Douglass-Reams House, Franklin, Tennessee, listed on the NRHP in Williamson County, Tennessee
- Douglass-Clark House, Gallatin, Tennessee, listed on the NRHP in Sumner County, Tennessee
- Samuel Douglass House, Payson, Utah, listed on the NRHP in Utah County, Utah
- Douglass-Stevenson House, Fontana, Wisconsin, listed on the NRHP in Walworth County, Wisconsin

== See also ==
- Douglas House (disambiguation)
- Douglass School (disambiguation)
- Frederick Douglass National Historic Site
