= Robert L. Douglass House =

Historic house in Nevada, United States

- U.S. National Register of Historic Places
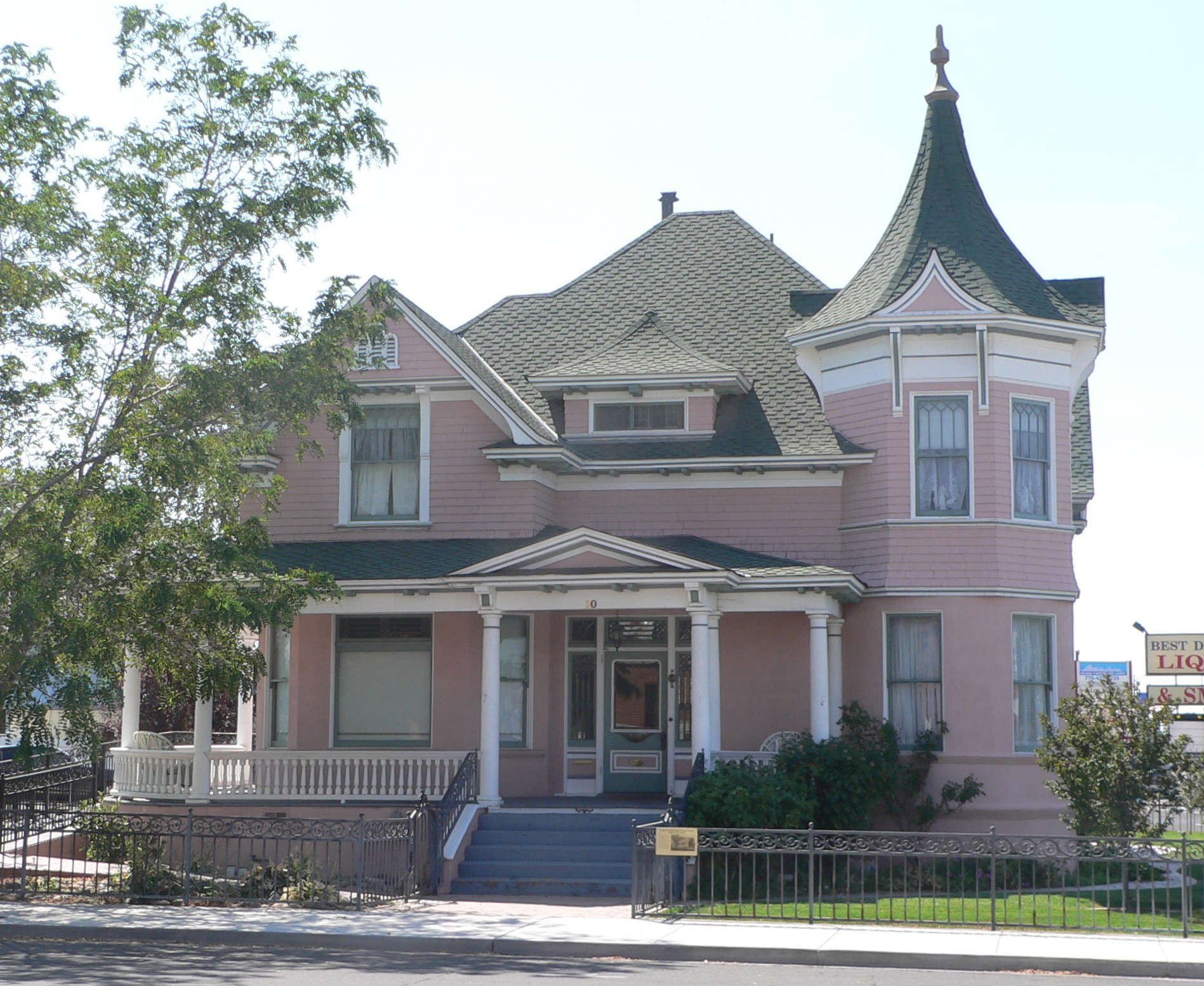
- View from the east, across Carson

- Location within Nevada Location within the United States
- Location: 10 S. Carson St., Fallon, Nevada
- Coordinates: 39°28′28.8″N 118°46′42.5″W
- Built: 1904
- Architectural style: Queen Anne
- NRHP reference No.: 01000822
- Added to NRHP: August 13, 2001

The Robert L. Douglass House, at 10 S. Carson St. in Fallon, Nevada, United States, was built in 1904. It has been described as an "outstanding" example of Queen Anne architecture. The property also includes a structure known as the Cottage Hospital and the Fallon Hospital, it was listed on the National Register of Historic Places in 2001. The listing included two contributing buildings.

No newspaper article or historical document contains any information which reveals the identity of the designer. But in 1903, a Reno architect named Ben Leon came to Fallon to design the Churchill County Courthouse and Churchill County Jail. That is why he is suspected to be the designer of the Robert L. Douglass House.

== Description ==
Though the Robert L. Douglass House was constructed in 1904 to be used as a residence, it was used for a hospital and as a hotel for quite some time. The unidentified architect implemented the cross gable style for the roof and free classic Queen Anne style with some spindle-work elements for the 2,605 square-foot structure.

The free traditional porch wraps across the southern corner of the front elevation and the 2-story turret projects from the northeast nook. The composite roofline employs a mixture of hipped and gabled forms, with a hexagonal hipped roof, crowned via the usage of a finial, covering the turret. A shallow hipped-roof dormer is located above the lobby. The actual roof covering was timber shake, however a modern-day composition roof shingles has changed it. Historic images show the usage of decorative ridge caps, but those have not survived to the present time. Set into 3 faces of the turret roof are giblets offset from beneath with the aid of curvilinear brackets. Early images also exhibit a brick chimney at the north end of the house close by the parlor. The chimney has been replaced by a pipe stack. It is not diagnosed what brought about the alternative, however a severe earthquake hit the area in 1954 and might have compromised the stability of the previous chimney. An authentic smaller brick chimney can be found in the center of the house.

== History ==
The house was built in 1904-05 accompanied by a garage. The garage became of enough length to house the Doctor's vehicle, and was asked to have an internal turntable, which could rotate one hundred ninety degrees so the automobile could be driven directly out of the building. In 1914, the storage was turned into the Cottage Hospital, and a porch was added to the front along with 8 truncated columns. The redesign from garage to hospital included 2 additions to the rear and changes to the home windows and roofline. A next redesign between 1923 and 1947 transformed the Cottage Hospital into apartments and covered a third addition to the rear and the porch happened to be enclosed at that point.
