= Payson Historic District =

Historic district in Utah, United States

- U.S. National Register of Historic Places
- U.S. Historic district
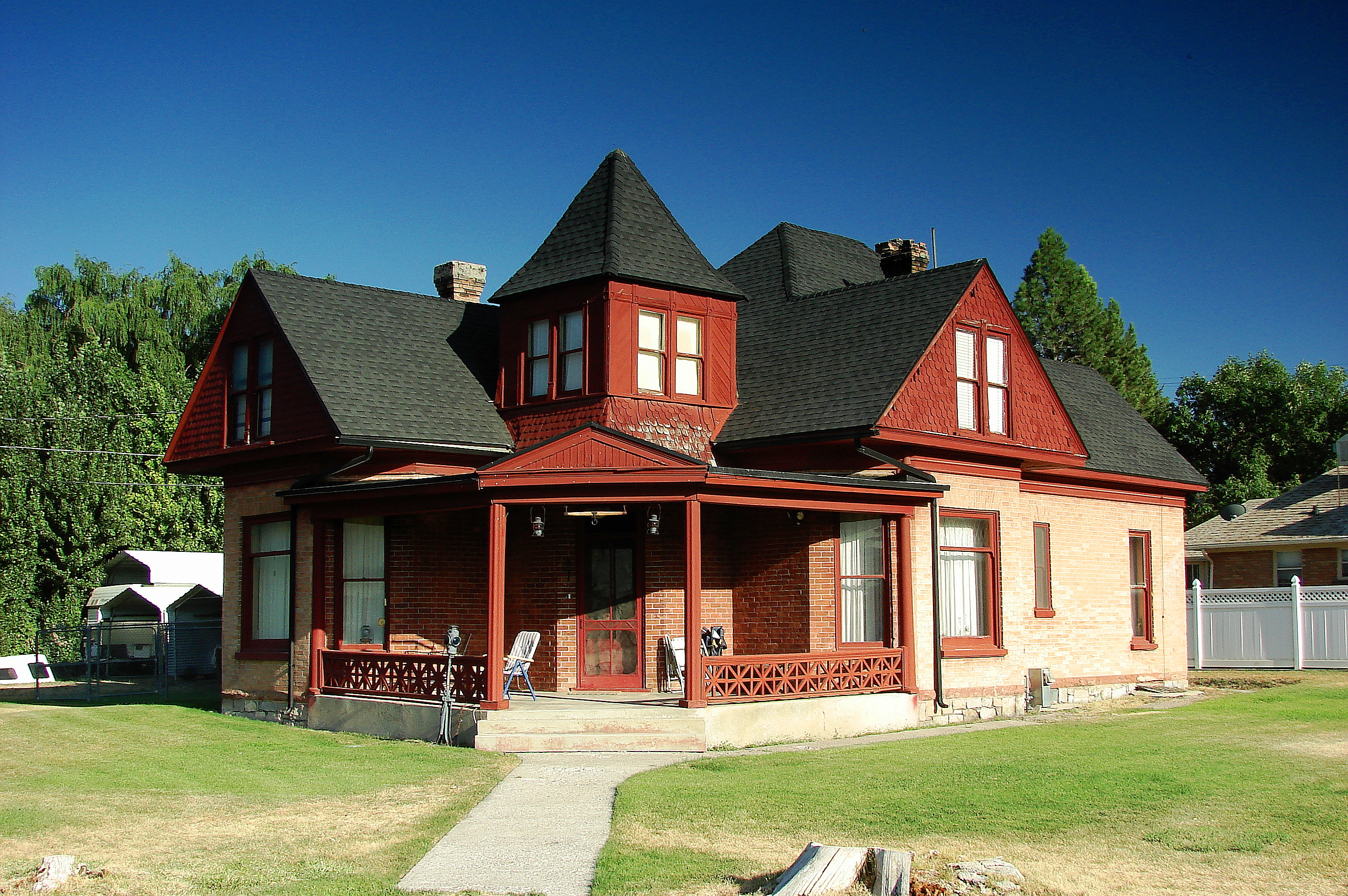
- Lemon Bryan House, one of the residences in the Payson Historic District, August 2009

- Location within Utah Location within the United States
- Location: Roughly bounded by 500 North, 300 East, 500 South, 400 West; Payson, Utah; United States
- Area: 300 acres (120 ha)
- Built: 1857
- Architectural style: Mid 19th Century Revival, Late Victorian
- NRHP reference No.: 07000666
- Added to NRHP: July 3, 2007

The Payson Historic District is a 300-acre (120 ha) historic district in Payson, Utah that was listed on the National Register of Historic Places in 2007.

== Description ==
The district includes 429 contributing buildings, two contributing structures, one contributing site and five contributing objects. It includes work dating to 1857, and Mid 19th Century Revival architecture, and Late Victorian architecture. It includes two historic hotels.

The district includes four contributing buildings that were already separately listed on the National Register:

- Christopher F. Dixon Jr. House, 248 North Main Street
- John Dixon House, 218 North Main Street
- Payson Presbyterian Church, 160 South Main Street
- Samuel Douglass House, 215 North Main Street

The Risser House, the house built in the early 1900s by the town's first doctor (Christian Risser), was renovated in 2024. Main Street was renovated and reopened to the public in 2024. The Main Street Cultural and Historic District was inaugurated in 2025.

The Peteetneet School, also NRHP-listed, is just adjacent to the east edge of the district.

== See also ==
- National Register of Historic Places listings in Utah County, Utah
