= John Dixon House =

Historic house in Utah, United States

- U.S. National Register of Historic Places
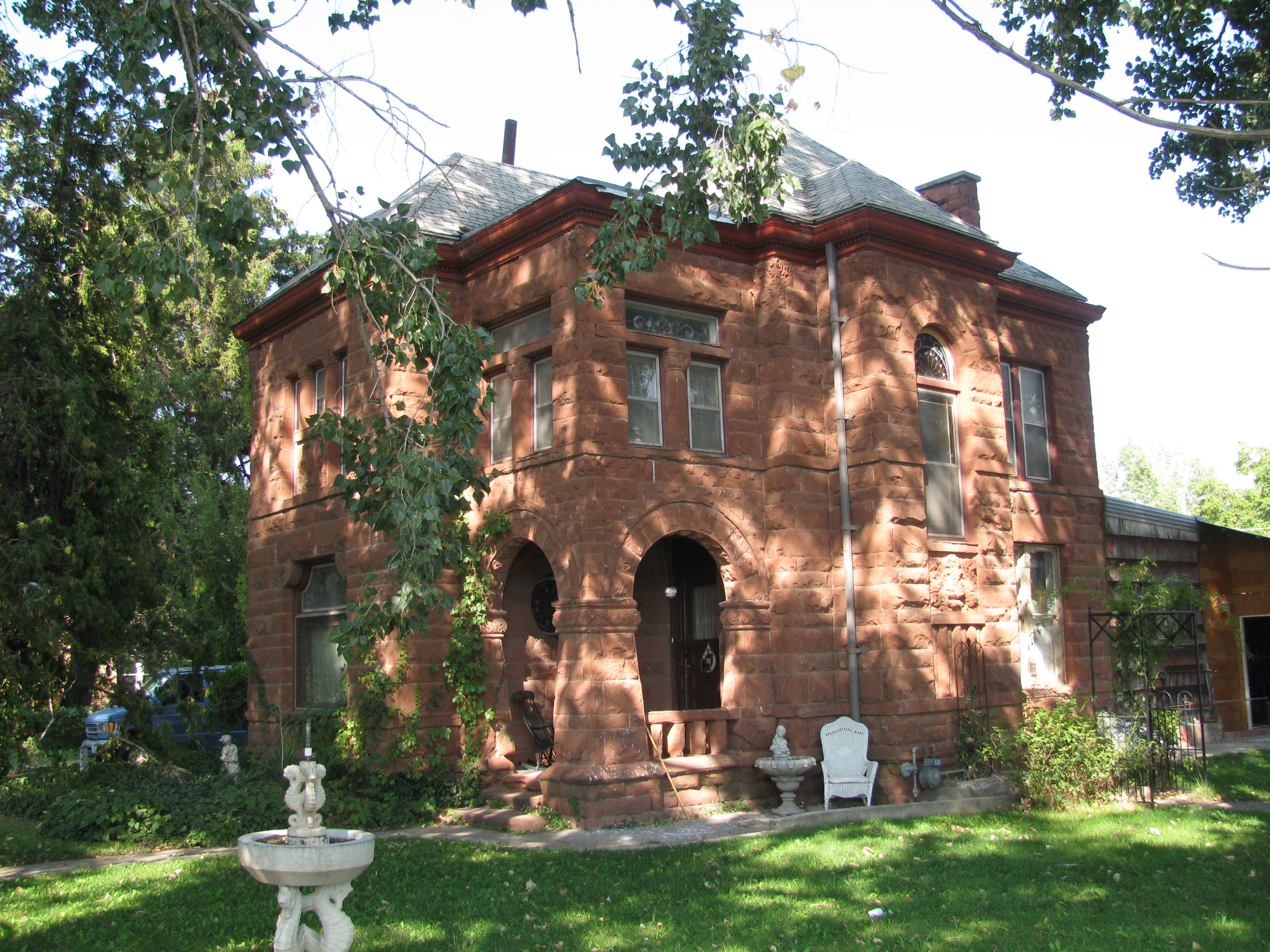

- Location within Utah Location within the United States
- Location: 218 N. Main Street, Payson, Utah
- Coordinates: 40°2′45″N 111°43′53″W
- Area: less than one acre
- Built: 1893
- Architectural style: Richardsonian Romanesque
- NRHP reference No.: 78002701
- Added to NRHP: February 17, 1978

The John Dixon House is a historic house located in Payson, Utah, United States. It was listed on the National Register of Historic Places on February 17, 1978.

== Description and history ==
The house was built in 1893. According to its 1977 NRHP nomination, the house "is architecturally significant as a rare example of the influence of the Richardsonian Romanesque mode of design on residential architecture of the state. The high quality of craftsmanship represented in the building is also significant."

It is also a contributing building in the Payson Historic District, which was listed on the National Register in 2007.

== See also ==
- National Register of Historic Places listings in Utah County, Utah
- Christopher F. Dixon, Jr., House, also NRHP-listed in Payson
