= Churchill County Jail =

- U.S. National Register of Historic Places
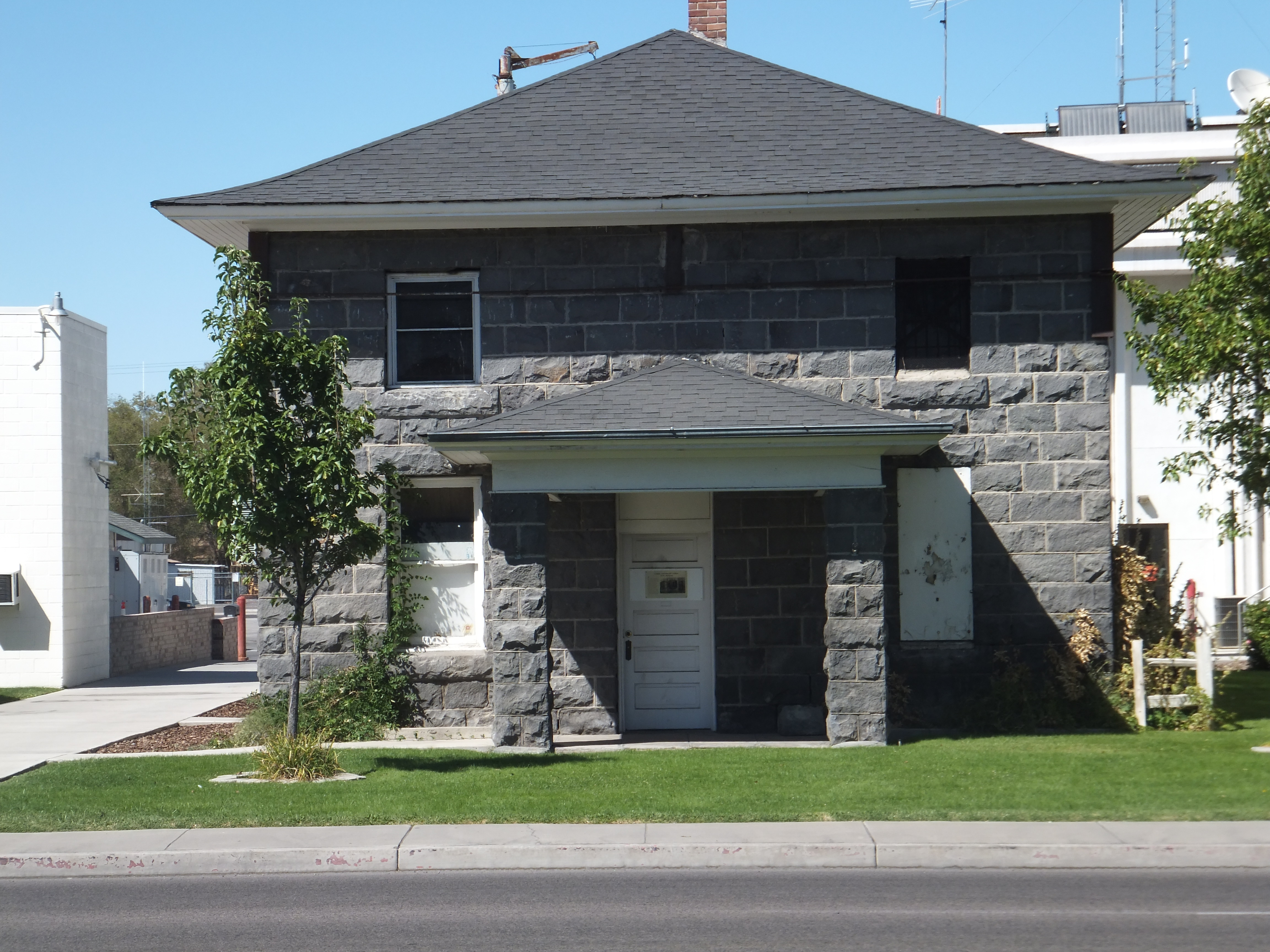

- Location within Nevada Location within the United States
- Location: 10 W Williams Ave., Fallon, Nevada
- Coordinates: 39°28′30″N 118°46′36″W
- Area: less than one acre
- Built: 1906
- Built by: Orchard and Galloway
- Architect: Leon, Ben
- Architectural style: Classical Revival
- NRHP reference No.: 01001546
- Added to NRHP: April 9, 2002

The Churchill County Jail, at 10 W. Williams St. in Fallon, Nevada, United States, is a historic jail built in 1906. It is "a simple utilitarian public building with Greek Revival influences that was designed by Reno architect Ben Leon. It was listed on the National Register of Historic Places in 2002. The Churchill County Courthouse, adjacent, also designed by Ben Leon, was listed on the NRHP ten years earlier.

== History ==
Two years before the conventional incorporation of Fallon, Churchill County Jail was constructed in 1906. Prisoners were shifted to different residences all over Churchill County before the construction of the jail. The initial location of the prison was at Buckland Station, east of Fort Churchill because during the year of 1861 Buckland remained the country-seat. It was a tiny rough-hewn structure back then. Amongst the local stone constructions, the old jail remains as the finest perseverance in the Lahontan Valley.

== Description ==
The frontage of the jail is at the south, its outer proportions are about forty six feet by twenty eight feet. The base of the structure is not evident though it is guessed that the same stones are used as used in the outer walls. Old pictures of the jail show that the entrance was approximately eighteen inches high from the ground level but the entrance on West Williams Avenue is at the ground level at present. Several incidents like the flood of 1907, construction of roads on William Avenue, and telephone company construction of the next door might have brought the in-filled soil around the jail.

The rooftop has rough cut two inches by 6 inches rafters on sixteen-inch centers and two inches by twelve inches ceiling joists on sixteen-inch centers. Twenty inches thick walls have an exterior surface of quarried stone, an internal coating of rock rubble and inner layer of concrete. The walls which separate the hallway and the office at the front are made of conventional woody frames covered with plaster. The two doors of the jail include the front door on the south direction and the entrance on the east which is used for the entry and exit of the prisoners.
