= Lovells Township, Michigan =

- Civil township
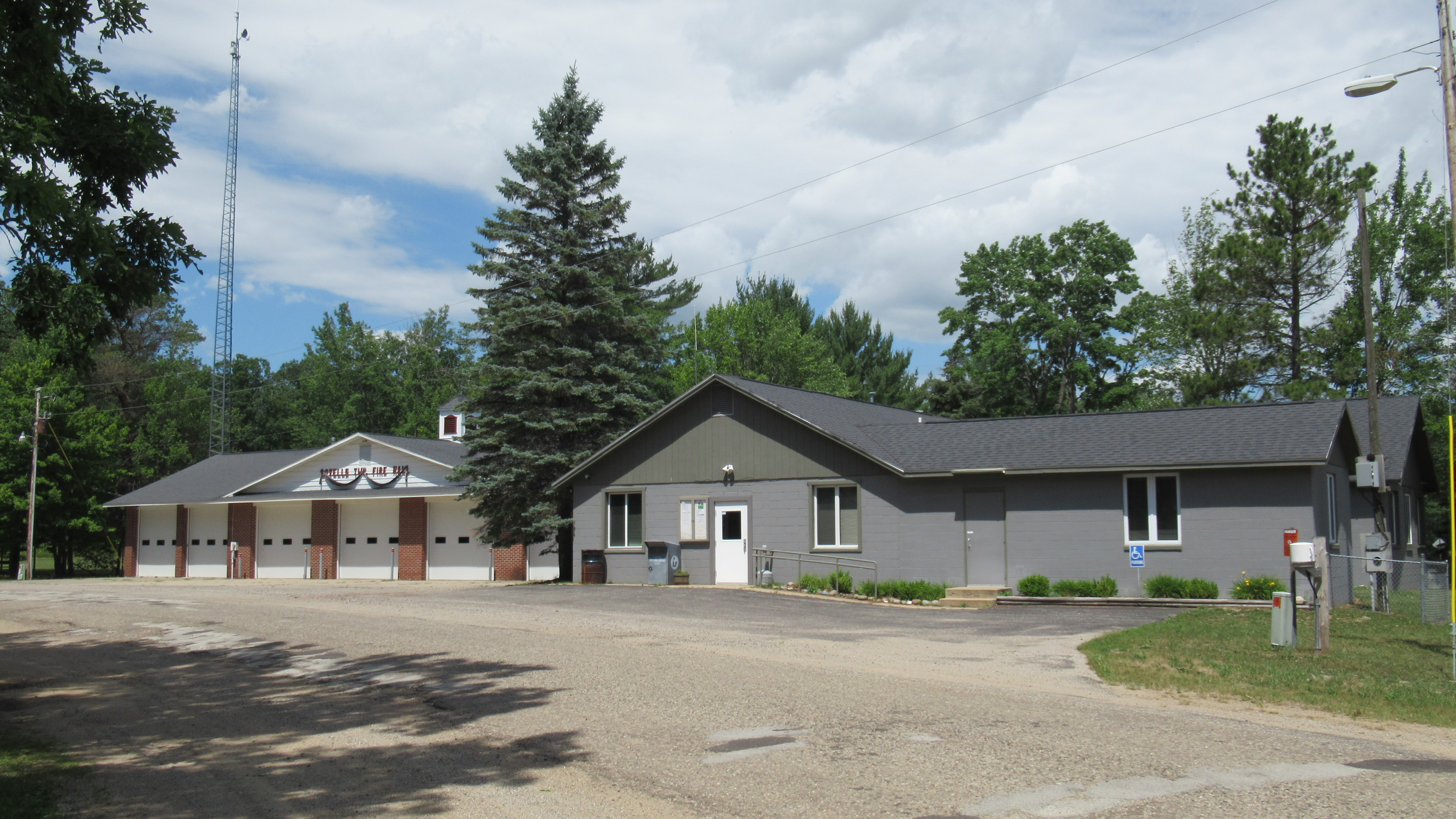
- Lovell Township Hall and Fire Department

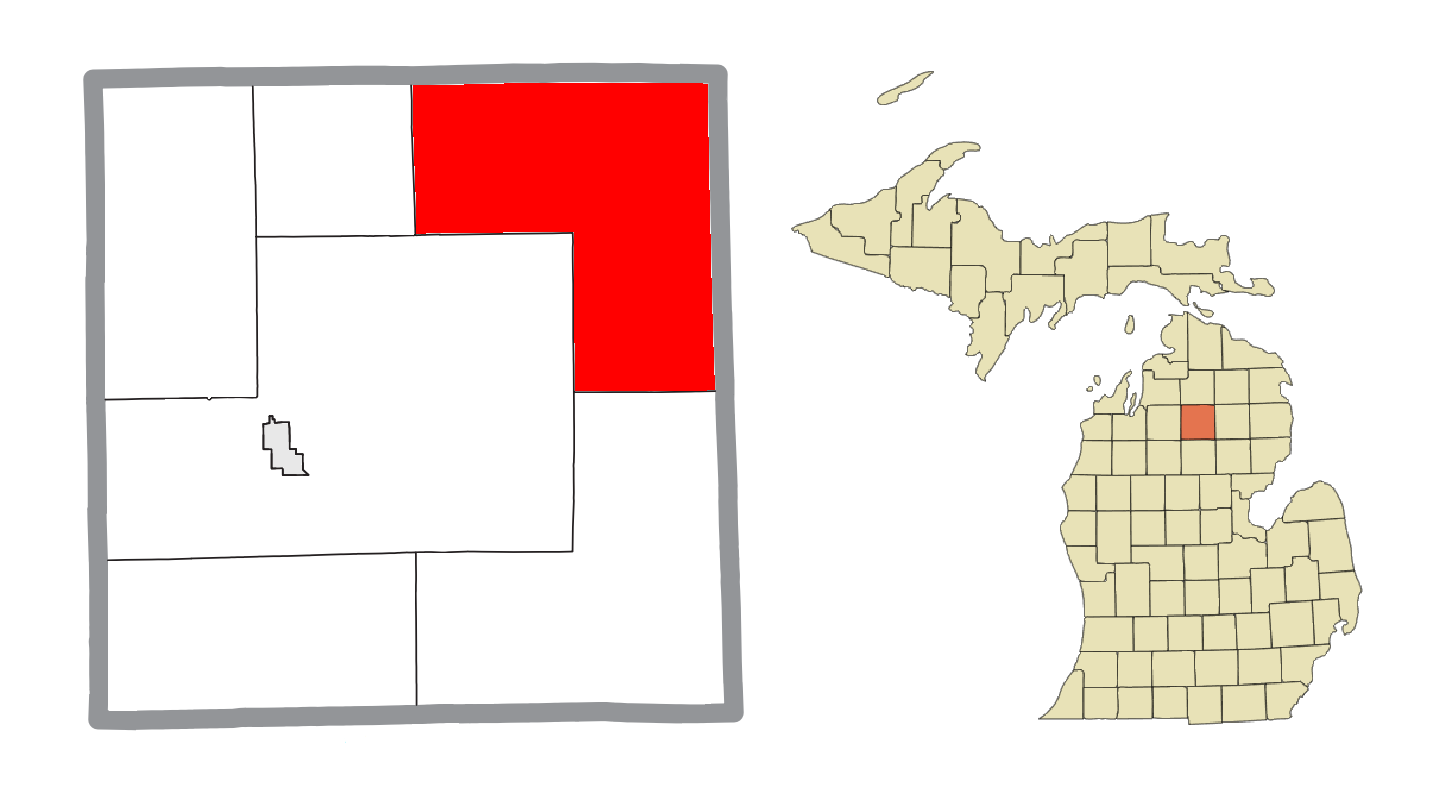
- Location within Crawford County

- Location within the state of Michigan Location within the United States
- Coordinates: 44°46′49″N 84°27′17″W
- Country: United States
- State: Michigan
- County: Crawford
- Established: 1912

Government
  - Supervisor: Gary Neumann
  - Clerk: Cynthia Infante Inman

Area
  - Total: 101.73 sq mi (263.5 km^{2})
  - Land: 100.55 sq mi (260.4 km^{2})
  - Water: 1.18 sq mi (3.1 km^{2})
- Elevation: 1,152 ft (351 m)

Population (2020)
  - Total: 567
  - Density: 5.64/sq mi (2.18/km^{2})
- Time zone: UTC-5 (Eastern (EST))
  - Summer (DST): UTC-4 (EDT)
- ZIP code(s): 49733 (Frederic); 49738 (Grayling); 49756 (Lewiston)
- Area code: 989
- FIPS code: 26-49520
- GNIS feature ID: 1626643
- Website: Official website

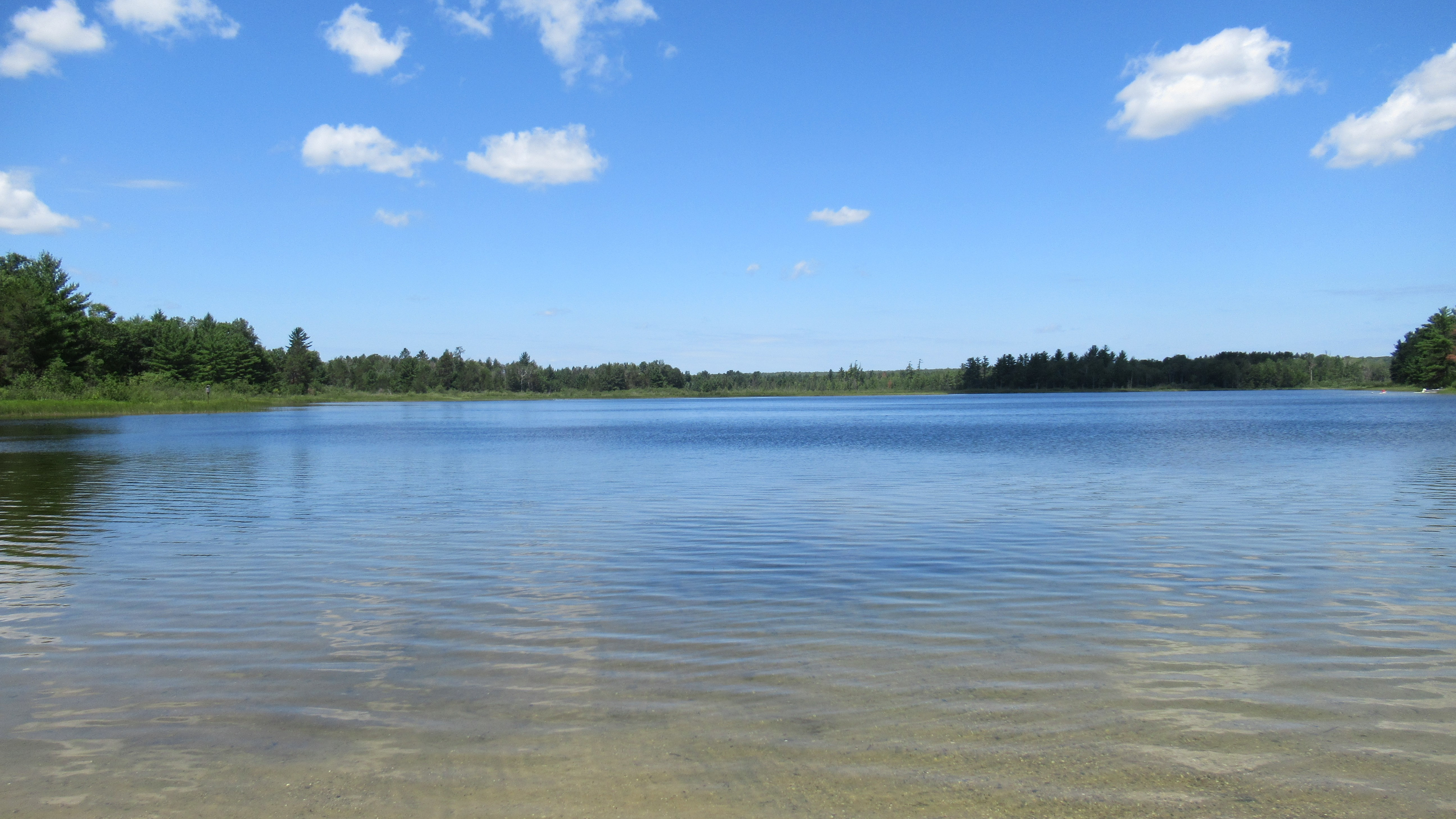
Jones Lake

Lovells Township is a civil township of Crawford County in the U.S. state of Michigan. The population was 567 at the 2020 census.

== Communities ==
- Lovells is an unincorporated community in the township on the North Branch of the Au Sable River at 44°48′11″N 84°28′55″W. Originally part of Maple Forest Township until Lovells Township was established in 1912, Lovells began as a station along the Michigan Central Railroad in 1889. A post office operated in Lovell from February 8, 1909 until September 15, 1936. Built in 1916, the Douglas House is located within Lovell. The community is home to the annual Lovells Bridge Walk event.

== Geography ==
According to the United States Census Bureau, the village has a total area of 101.73 square miles (263.48 km^{2}), of which 100.55 square miles (260.42 km^{2}) is land and 1.18 square miles (3.06 km^{2}) (1.16%) is water.

== Demographics ==
As of the census of 2000, there were 578 people, 283 households, and 179 families residing in the township. The population density was 5.7 inhabitants per square mile (2.2/km^{2}). There were 932 housing units at an average density of 9.2 per square mile (3.6/km^{2}). The racial makeup of the township was 99.31% White, 0.52% Native American, and 0.17% from two or more races. Hispanic or Latino of any race were 0.35% of the population.

There were 283 households, out of which 17.3% had children under the age of 18 living with them, 55.8% were married couples living together, 6.0% had a female householder with no husband present, and 36.4% were non-families. 31.1% of all households were made up of individuals, and 15.2% had someone living alone who was 65 years of age or older. The average household size was 2.04 and the average family size was 2.48.

In the township the population was spread out, with 15.4% under the age of 18, 2.9% from 18 to 24, 20.2% from 25 to 44, 31.7% from 45 to 64, and 29.8% who were 65 years of age or older. The median age was 52 years. For every 100 females, there were 102.1 males. For every 100 females age 18 and over, there were 107.2 males.

The median income for a household in the township was $31,023, and the median income for a family was $37,000. Males had a median income of $37,813 versus $20,417 for females. The per capita income for the township was $21,401. About 1.7% of families and 7.6% of the population were below the poverty line, including 4.3% of those under age 18 and 6.2% of those age 65 or over.
