= Fernwood (Brookline, Massachusetts) =

Historic house in Massachusetts, United States

- U.S. National Register of Historic Places
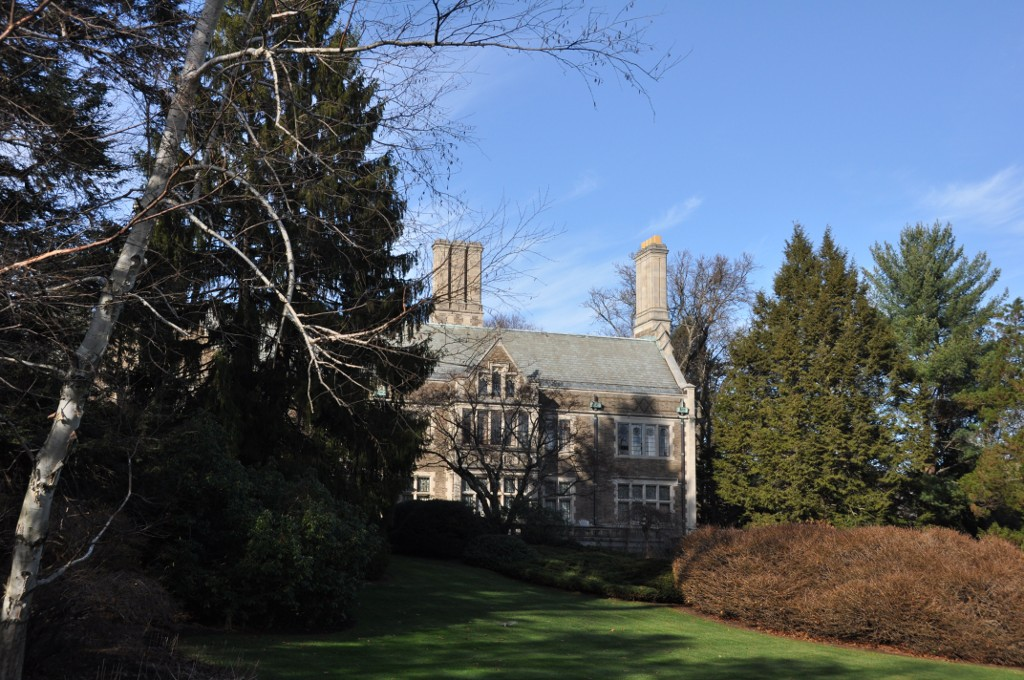

- Location within Massachusetts Location within the United States
- Location: 155 Clyde St., Brookline, Massachusetts
- Coordinates: 42°19′14″N 71°8′50″W
- Area: 2.7 acres (1.1 ha)
- Built: 1909
- Architect: Patch, Charles; Olmsted Bros.
- Architectural style: Tudor Revival, Jacobethan Revival
- MPS: Brookline MRA
- NRHP reference No.: 85003264
- Added to NRHP: October 17, 1985

Fernwood is a historic estate house at 155 Clyde Street in Brookline, Massachusetts, United States. Built in 1909, it is a distinctive example of Jacobethan architecture, and one of a few surviving country estate houses of the early 20th century in the town. The house was listed on the National Register of Historic Places in 1985.

== Description and history ==
The Fernwood main house is located in southern Brookline's Buttonwood Village area, in the northeastern part of the former Fernwood estate. The estate has been subdivided, and this house is accessed via the main drive through the former estate (now Fernwood Road). It is a 2 1/2-story masonry structure, with brick walls and limestone trim. It has bands of sash windows with rectangular lights, parapeted gables that are steeply pitched, and round-arch doorways. The interior of the house is framed with steel beams, and contains no wood finishes.

The land of the Fernwood estate was owned in the late 19th century by Thomas Handasyd Perkins, whose own estate was next door. This land he gave to his daughter Caroline and son-in-law William Gardiner. It was purchased in the early 20th century by Alfred Douglass, a retired New York merchant, who tore down the existing house and had Fernwood built. The estate house was designed by Charles Patch, and the landscaping was done to a plan by the Olmsted Brothers. The house's Jacobethan or Tudor Revival style was quite popular at the time. Douglass only briefly lived on the estate, forced to sell in the 1910s by financial reverses. The Fernwood estate was subdivided later in the 20th century, including splitting off the servants' quarters.

== See also ==
- National Register of Historic Places listings in Brookline, Massachusetts
