= Lancaster Gate =

Development in Bayswater, London

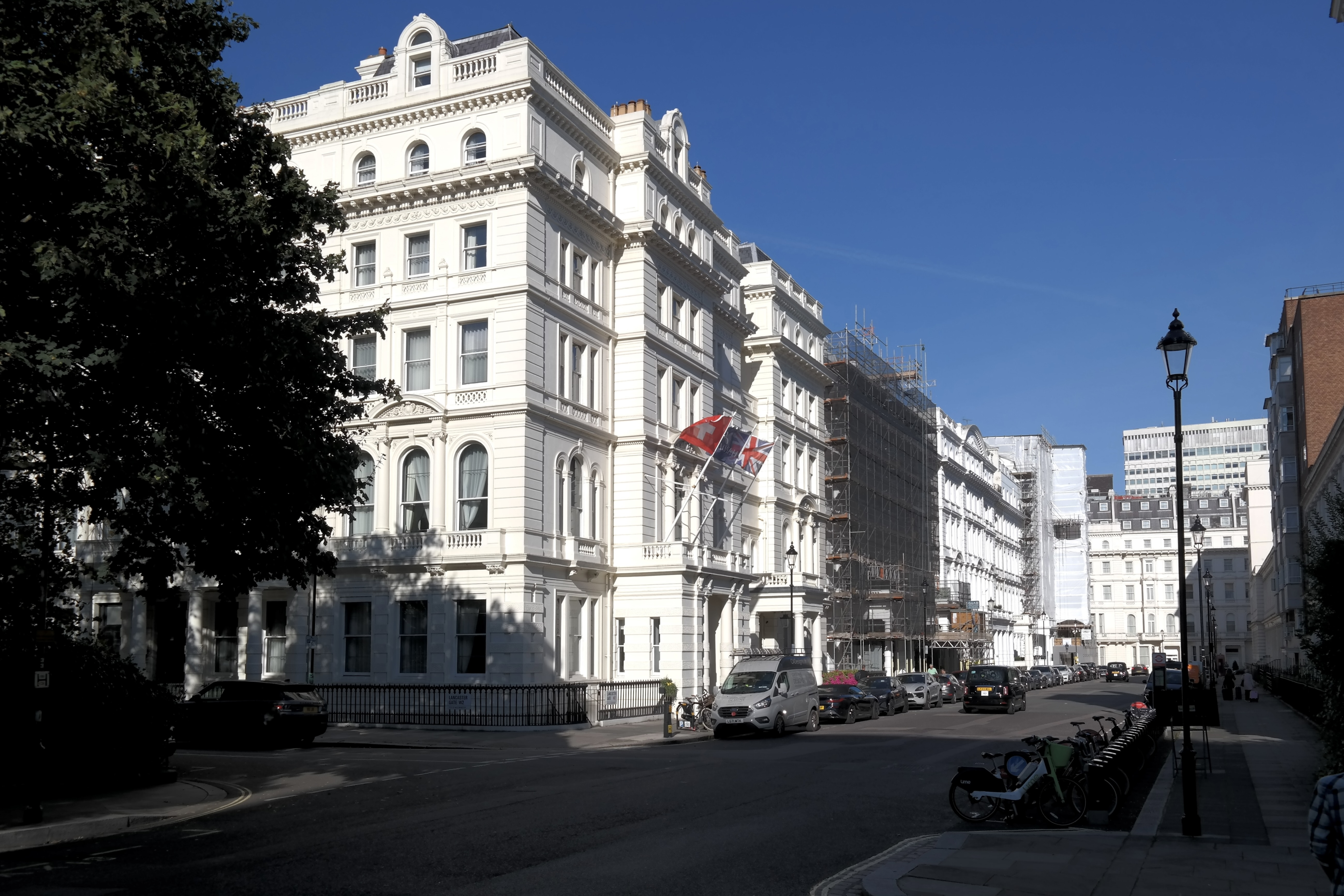
- Lancaster Gate, houses 14-26
- Interactive map of Lancaster Gate
- Coordinates: 51°30′41.6″N 0°10′48.5″W

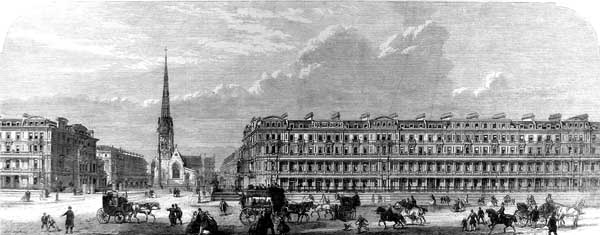
Lancaster Gate in 1866.

Lancaster Gate is a mid-19th century development in the Bayswater district of central London, immediately to the north of Kensington Gardens.

== History ==
It consists of two long terraces of houses overlooking the park, with a wide gap between them opening onto a square containing a church. Further terraces back onto the pair overlooking the park and loop around the square. Until 1865 the terraces were known as Upper Hyde Park Gardens, with the name Lancaster Gate limited to the square surrounding the church. The development takes its name from Lancaster Gate, a nearby entrance to Kensington Gardens, itself named in honour of Queen Victoria as Duke of Lancaster.

The terraces are stuccoed and are in an eclectic classical style featuring English Baroque details and French touches. The church, known as Christ Church, Lancaster Gate, was an asymmetrical gothic composition with a needle spire. The architects were F. & H. Francis. The church was one of the best-known in London, but when dry rot was discovered in the roof the decision was taken to demolish most of the building and redevelop the site. The last service in the church was on 6 March 1977, and demolition began on 15 August 1977; only the tower and spire survive. The rest of the building was replaced by a housing scheme called Spire House in 1983.

Lancaster Gate stands alongside Hyde Park Gardens as one of the two grandest of the 19th-century housing schemes lining the northern side of Hyde Park and Kensington Gardens.

The development was planned in 1856–57 on the site of a nursery and tea gardens, and construction took at least 10 years. The terraces overlooking the park were designed by Sancton Wood and those around the square by John Johnson. The exteriors are largely complete, with just a couple of 20th-century infills, but many of the interiors have been reconstructed behind the facades. Many of the properties are still in residential use and command very high prices. Others are used as embassies (such as the Embassy of Costa Rica), offices, or hotels. For many years, the headquarters of The Football Association were located in Lancaster Gate and the term was often used as a metonym for the organisation, but it later relocated to Soho Square and is now based at Wembley Stadium. Royal Lancaster Hotel, opposite the Italian Gardens of Hyde Park, was built in 1967.

Lancaster Gate is also an electoral ward of Westminster City Council. The population at the 2011 Census was 13,195.

== Gallery ==
A map showing the Lancaster Gate wards of the Metropolitan Borough of Paddington as they appeared in 1916.

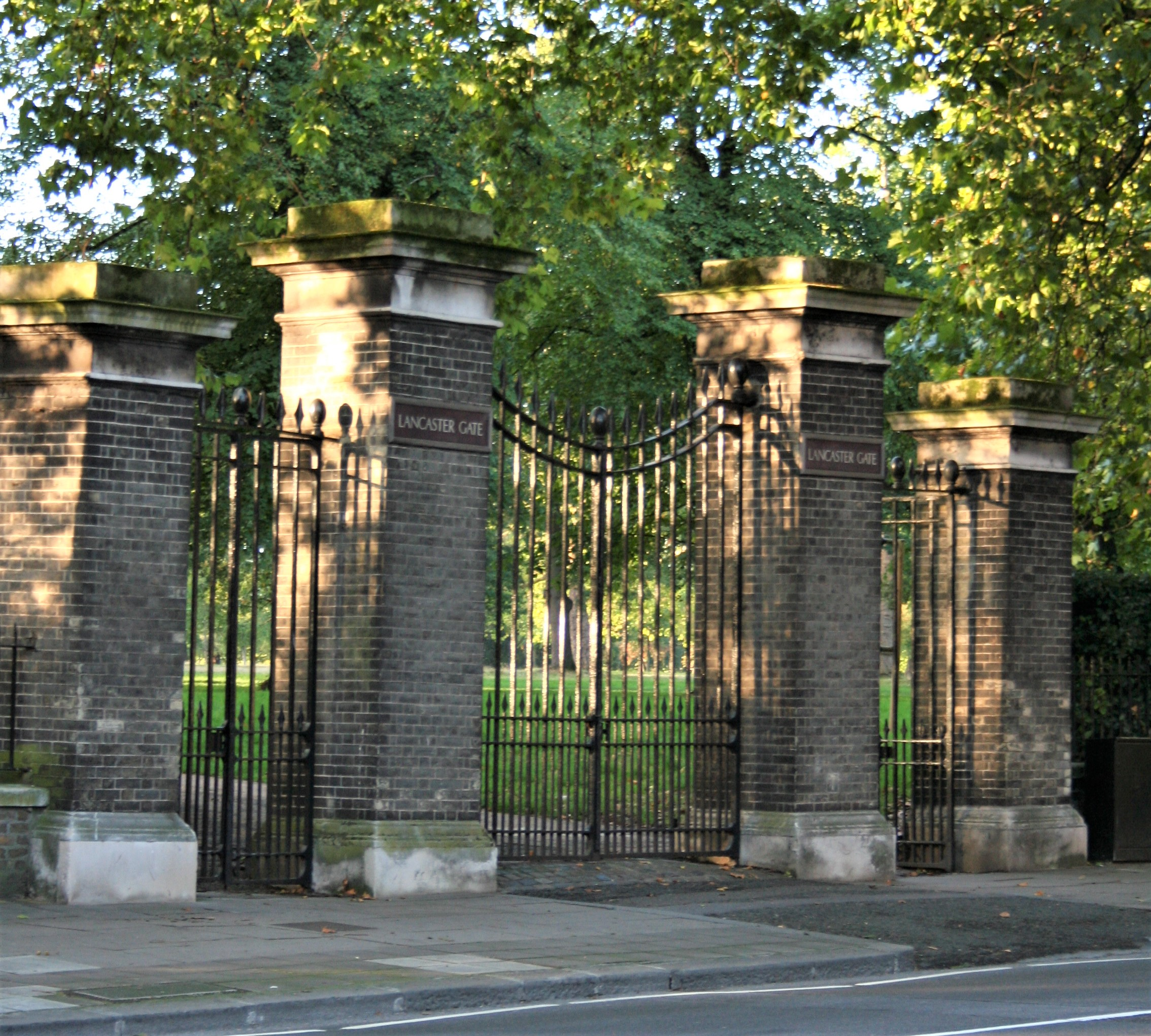
The Lancaster Gate of Kensington Gardens

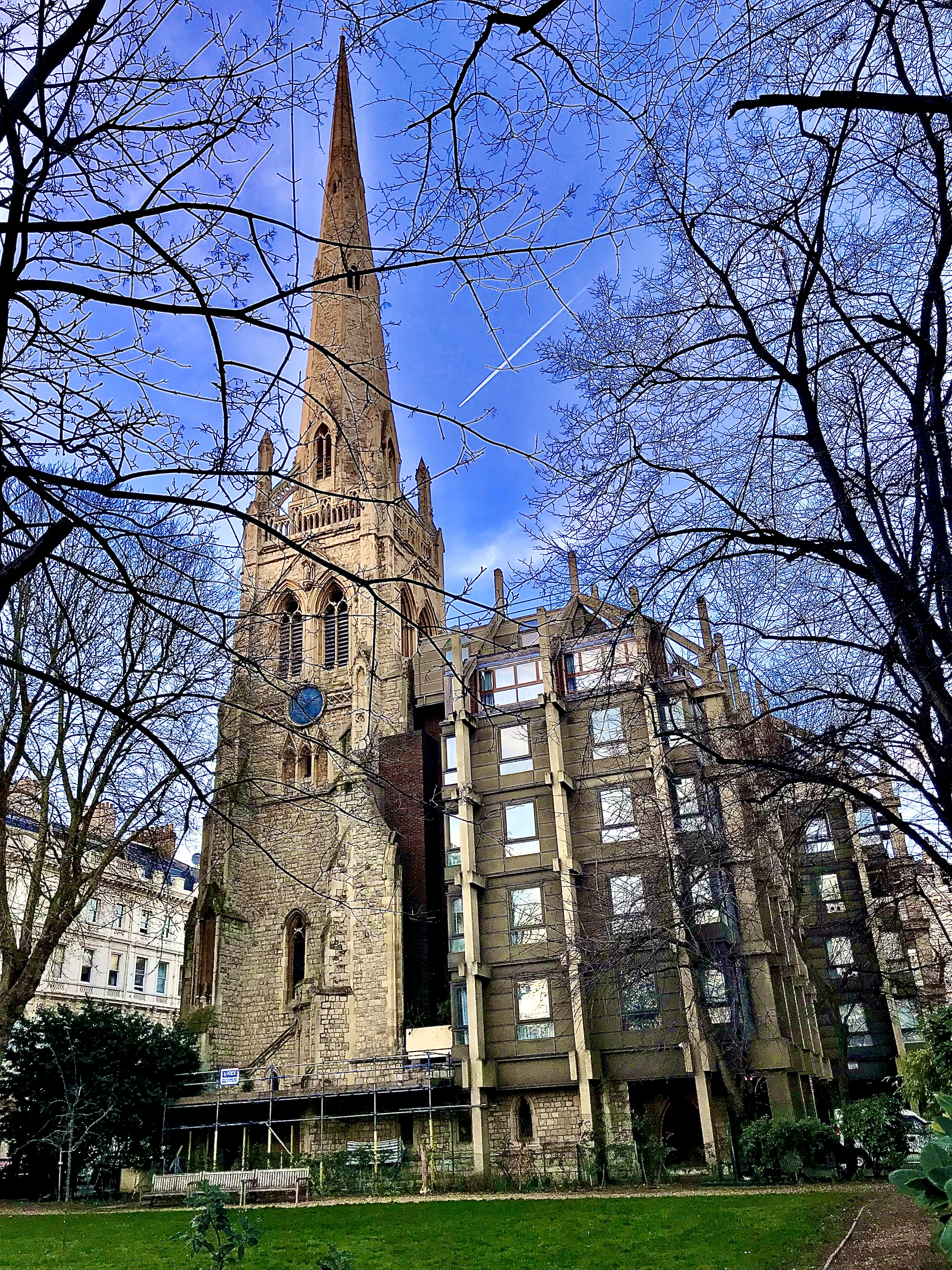
South face of Spire House (formerly Christ Church, Lancaster Gate)

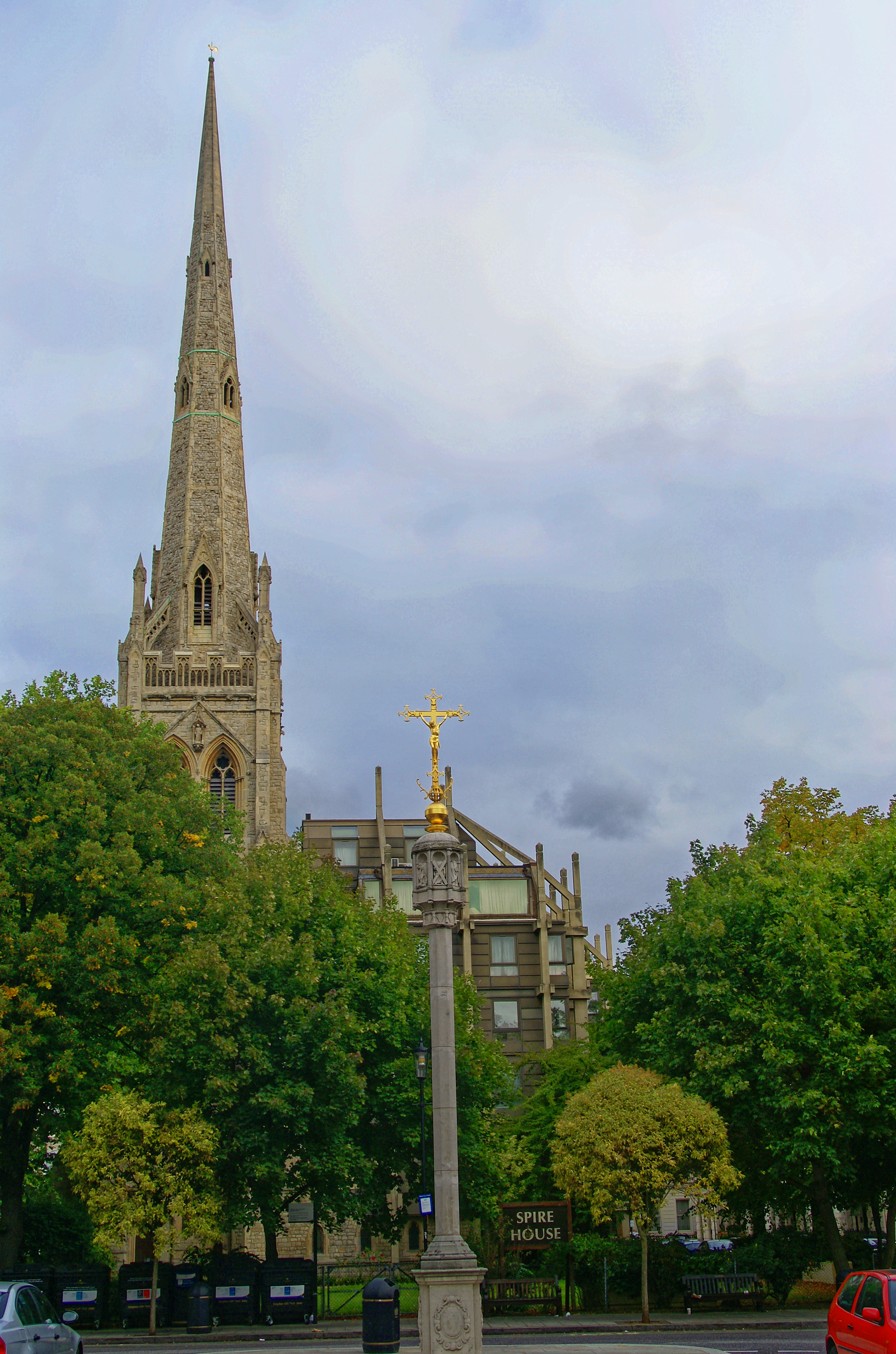
Spire House

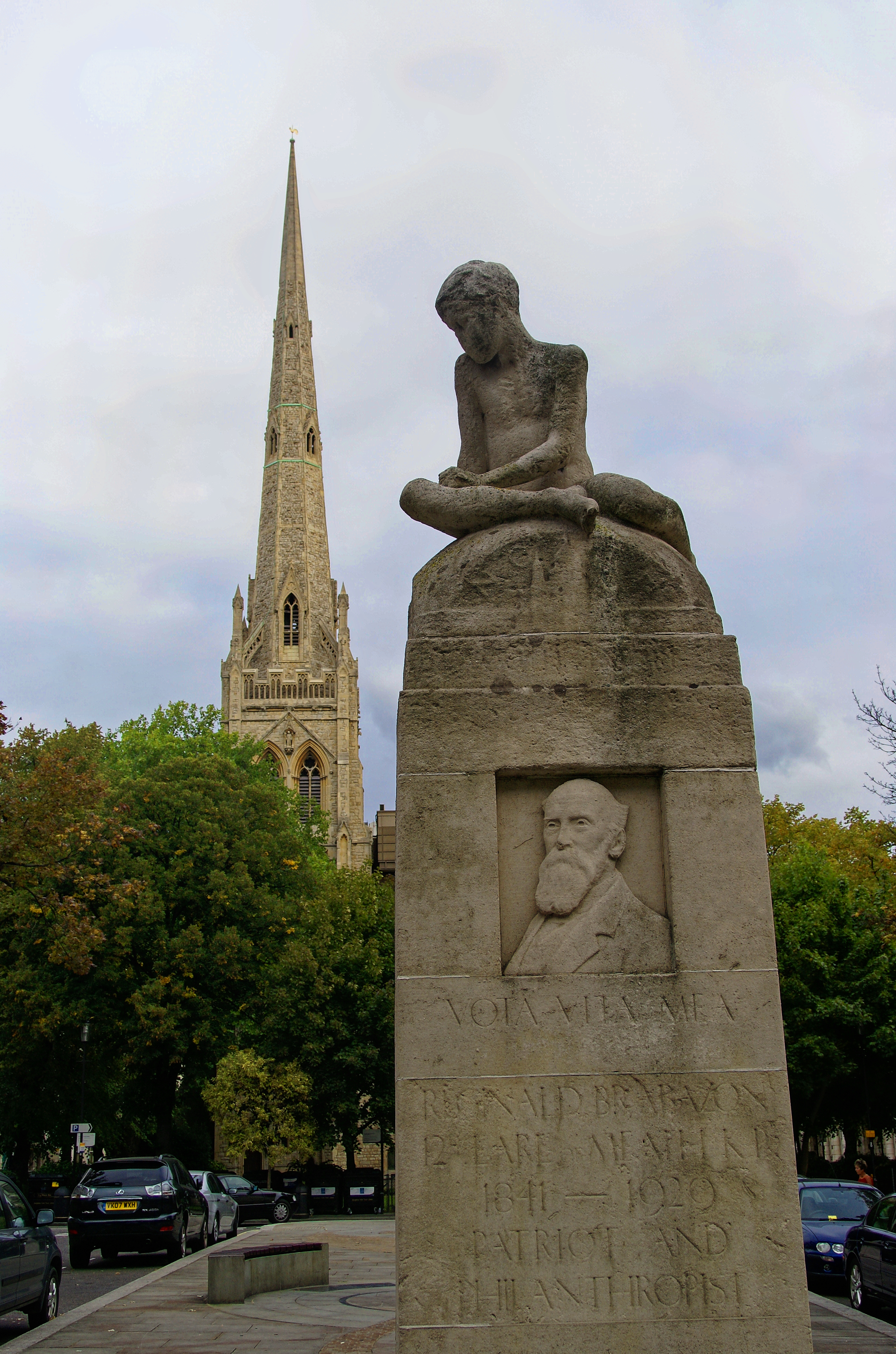
Memorial to Reginald Brabazon, 12th Earl of Meath (South face), artist Joseph Hermon Cawthra, (Spire House in background)

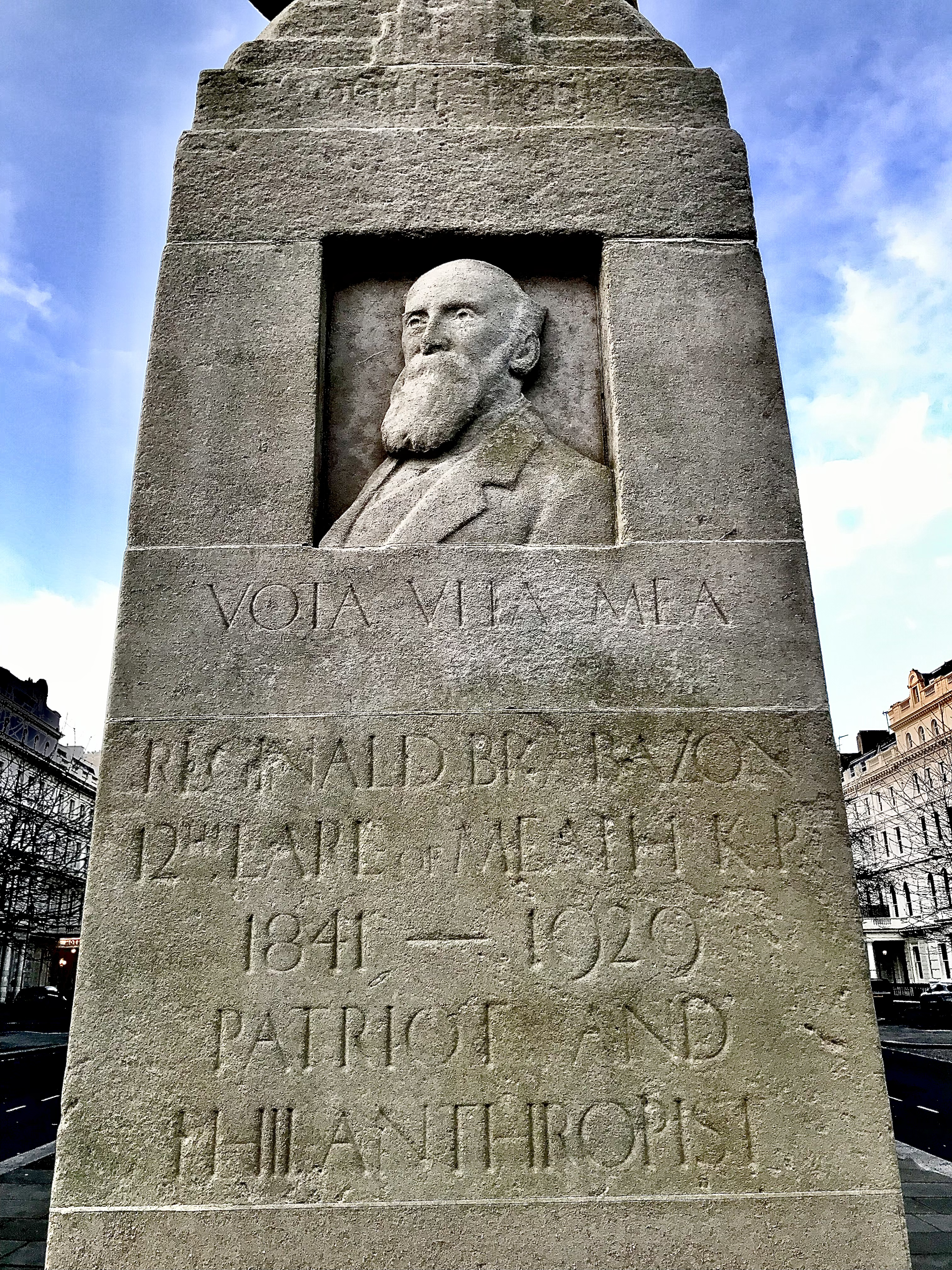
Meath memorial, detail of bas-relief portrait and main inscription

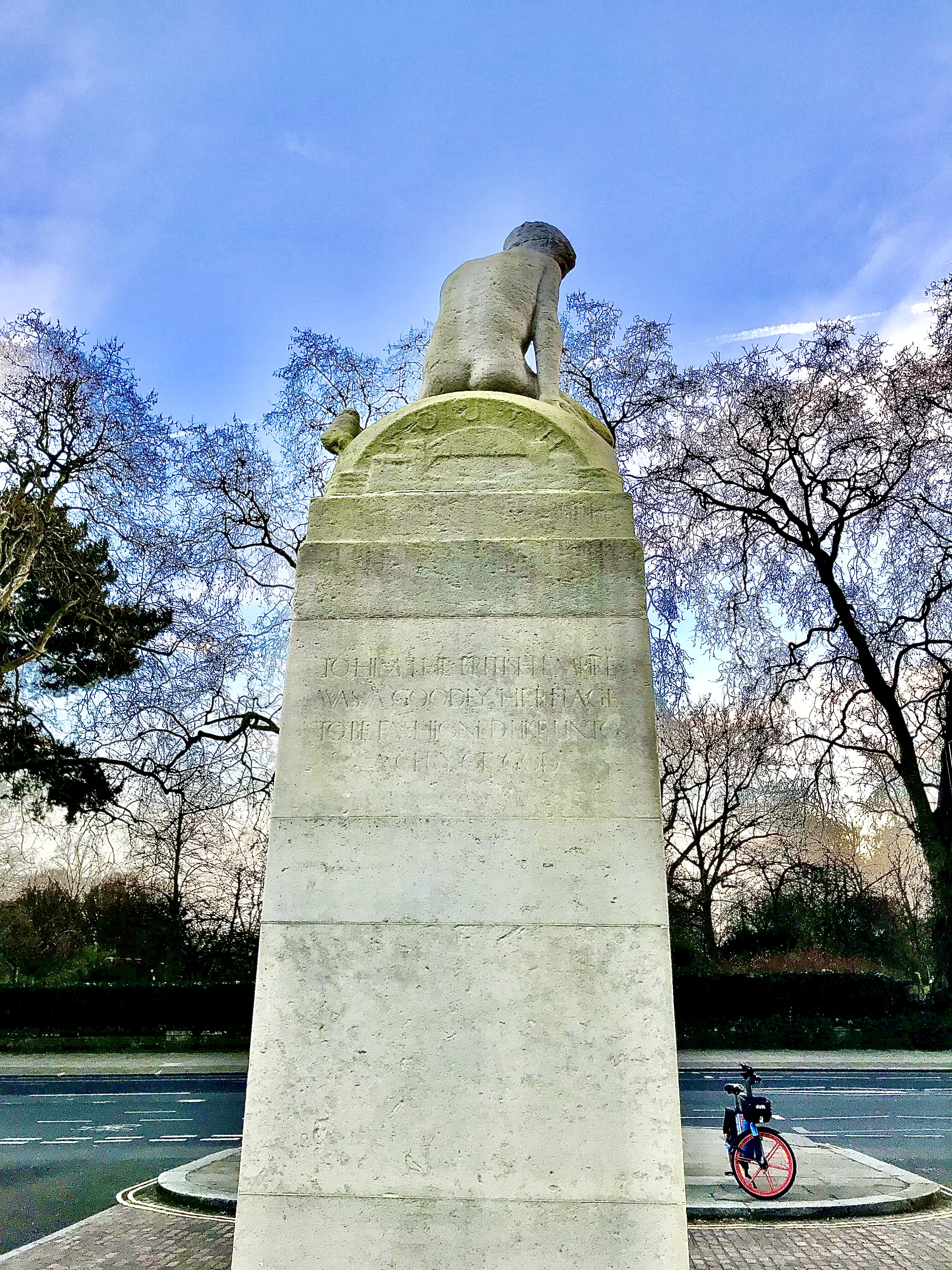
Back (North face) of Meath memorial, showing view of Kensington Gardens to the south

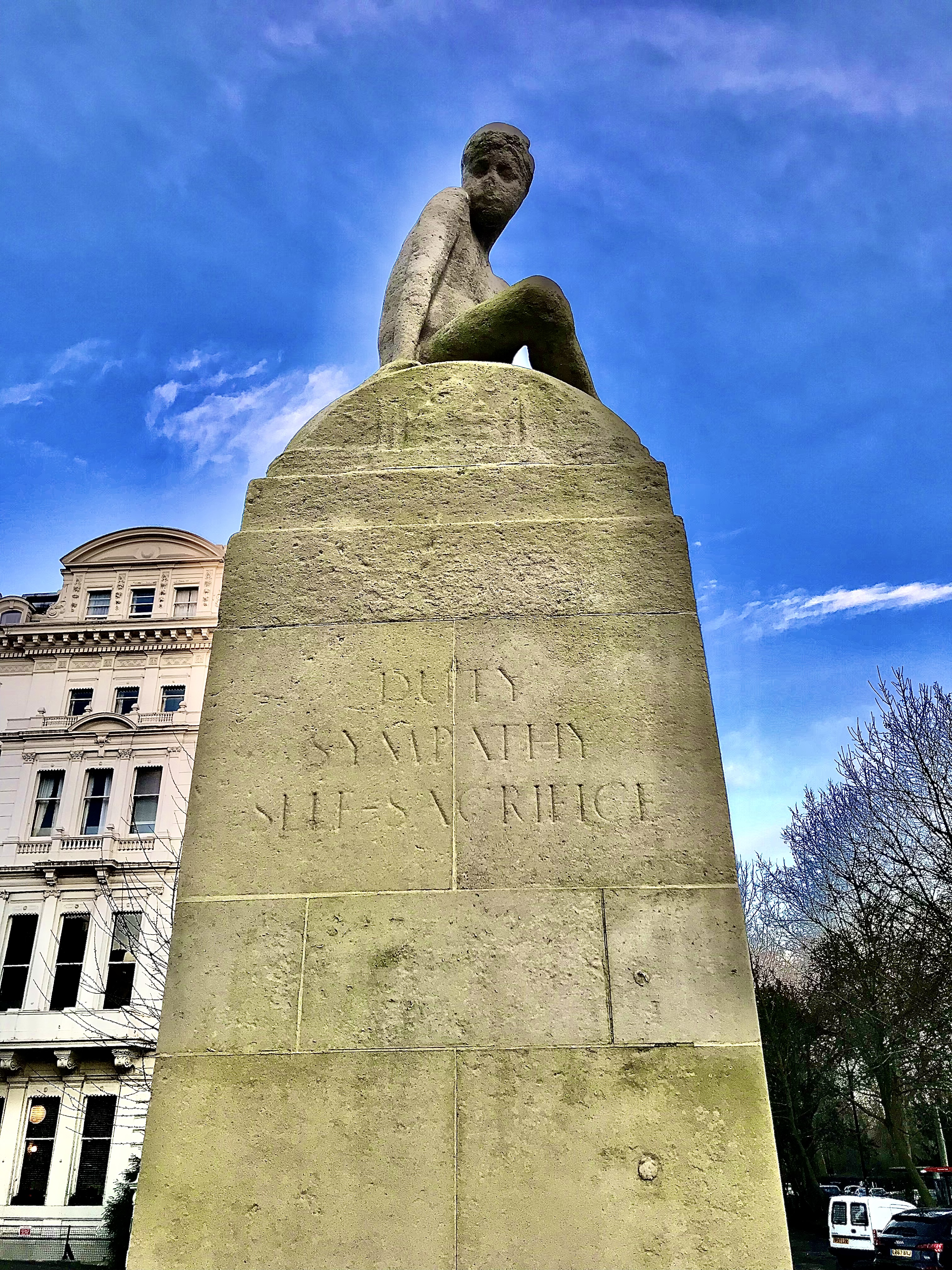
West face of Meath memorial (viewer facing east).Inscription reads "Duty, Sympathy, Self-Sacrifice"

== See also ==
- Craven Hill Gardens
- Douglas House
- Lancaster Gate tube station
- Leinster Gardens
