= Payson Presbyterian Church =

Historic church in Utah, United States

- U.S. National Register of Historic Places
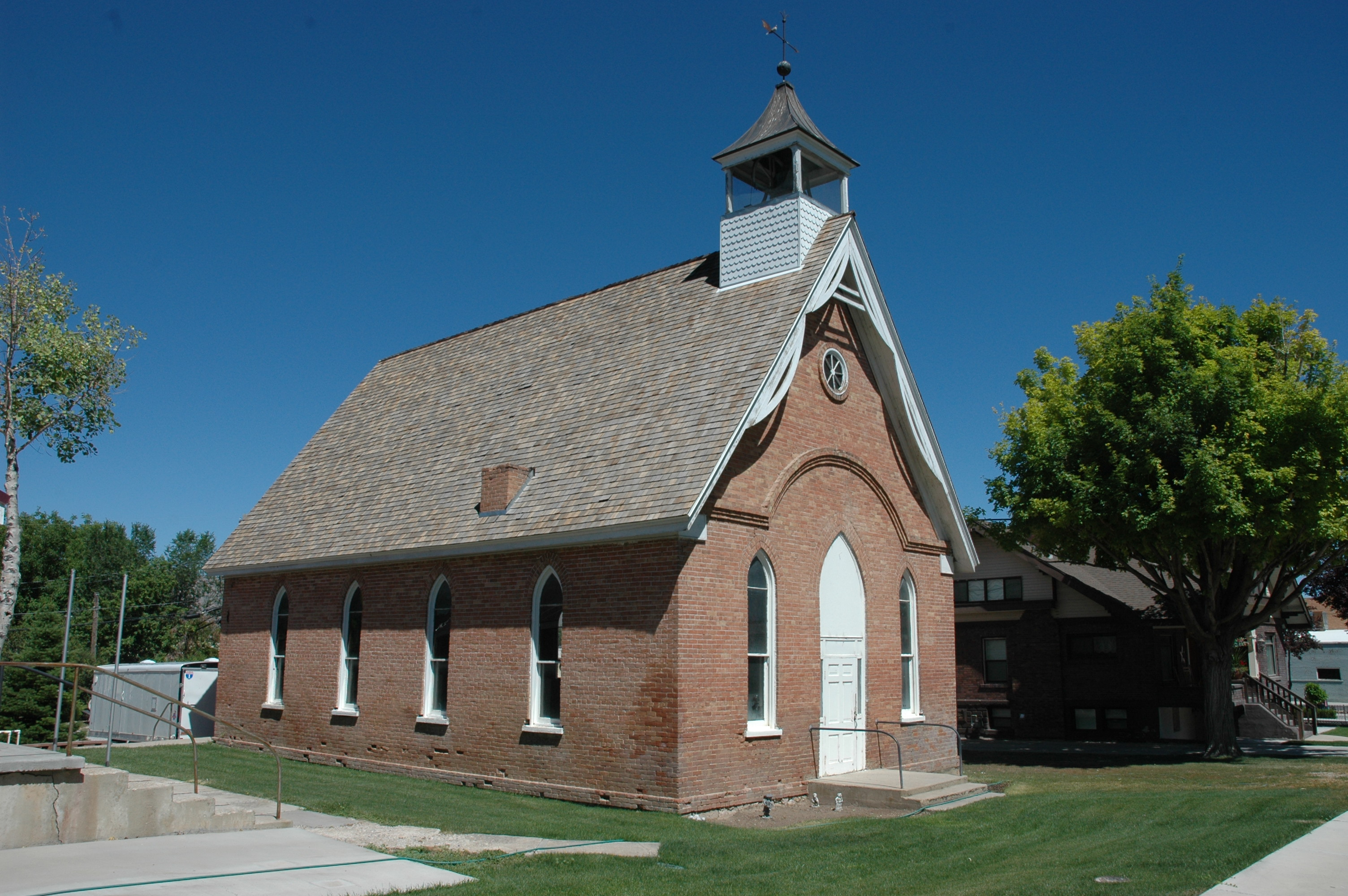
- Payson Presbyterian Church, June 2012

- Location within Utah Location within the United States
- Location: 160 South Main Street; Payson, Utah; United States
- Coordinates: 40°2′7″N 111°43′54″W
- Area: less than one acre
- Built: 1882
- Architectural style: Gothic Revival
- NRHP reference No.: 86000610
- Added to NRHP: March 27, 1986

The Payson Presbyterian Church at 160 South Main Street in Payson, Utah, United States was built in 1882. It has also been known as Payson Bible Church. It was listed on the National Register of Historic Places (NRHP) in 1986; the listing included two contributing buildings.

== Description ==
According to its NRHP nomination, it is "one of a number of Protestant churches constructed in Utah during the 1870s-90s, the period of most concentrated and active missionary work by Protestants among the Mormons."

It is also a contributing building in the Payson Historic District, which was listed on the National Register in 2007.

== See also ==
- National Register of Historic Places listings in Utah County, Utah
