= Douglass-Reams House =

Historic house in Tennessee, United States

- U.S. National Register of Historic Places
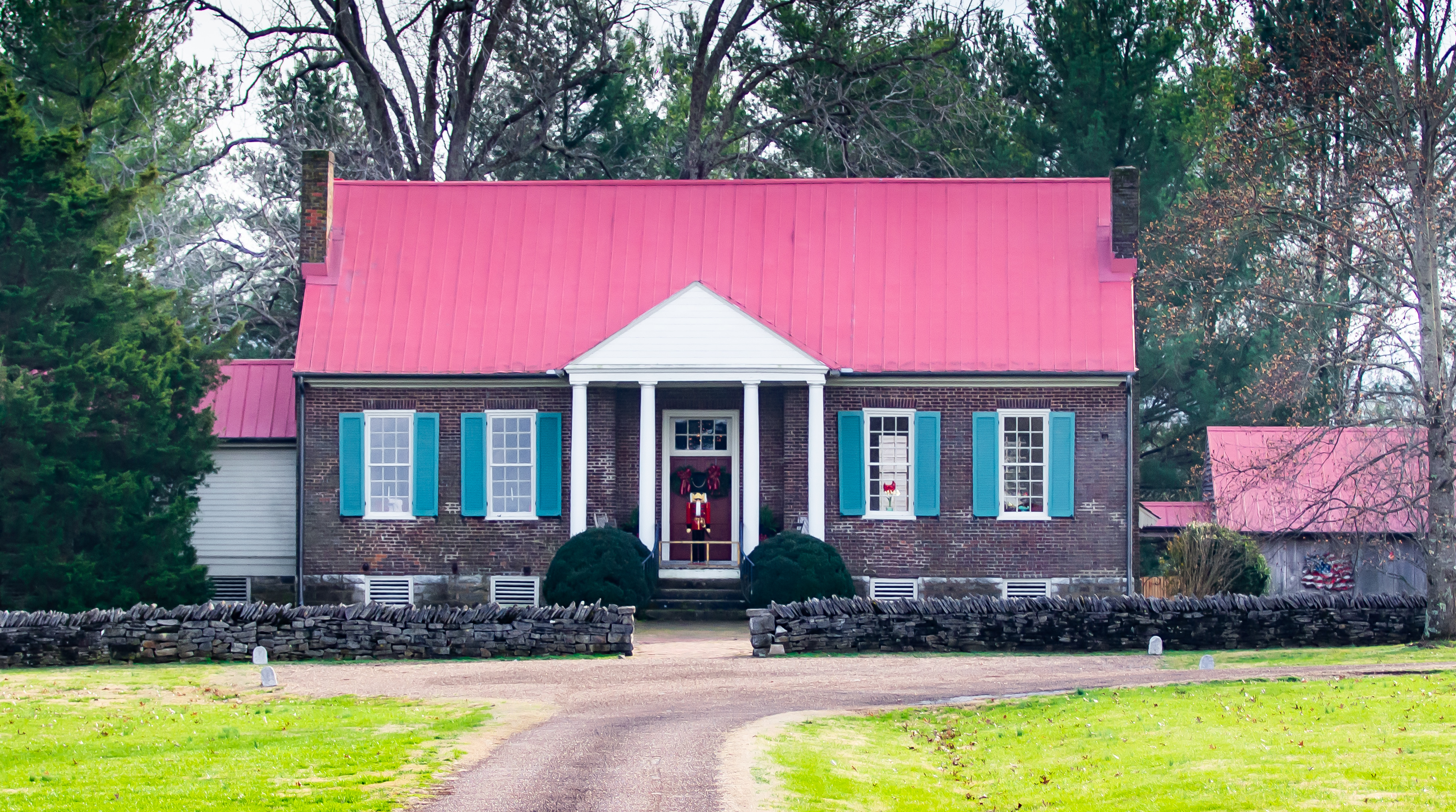

- Location within Tennessee Location within the United States
- Location: 2435 Douglass Glen Ln., Franklin, Tennessee
- Coordinates: 35°52′28″N 86°50′59″W
- Area: 1 acre (0.40 ha)
- Built: c. 1828
- Architectural style: Federal, central passage plan
- MPS: Williamson County MRA
- NRHP reference No.: 88000293
- Added to NRHP: April 13, 1988

Douglass-Reams House is a c. 1828 center-hall house in Franklin, Tennessee.

It was listed on the National Register of Historic Places in 1988. The notability of the property was mentioned in a 1988 study of Williamson County historical resources:

The greatest number of early brick residences were built in central hall or central passage plan arrangements. In these homes the main entrance opens onto a central hallway flanked by two large rooms. Each of these rooms contains a fireplace and often decorative Federal style mantels. One-and one-half or two-story central hall plan residences generally have the main staircase located in the central hall. Examples of this style in the county constructed before 1830 include the William Allison House (WM-232), Newton Jordan House (WM-259), Mordecai Puryear House (WM-287) and the Douglass-Reams House (WM-540). All of these houses are noteworthy examples of this style and retain their original detailing. The Allison, Jordan and Puryear House are all of single pile or one room deep construction with rear ells or wings while the Reams House is double pile or two rooms deep and lacks a rear addition.
