= Christopher F. Dixon Jr. House =

Historic house in Utah, United States

- U.S. National Register of Historic Places
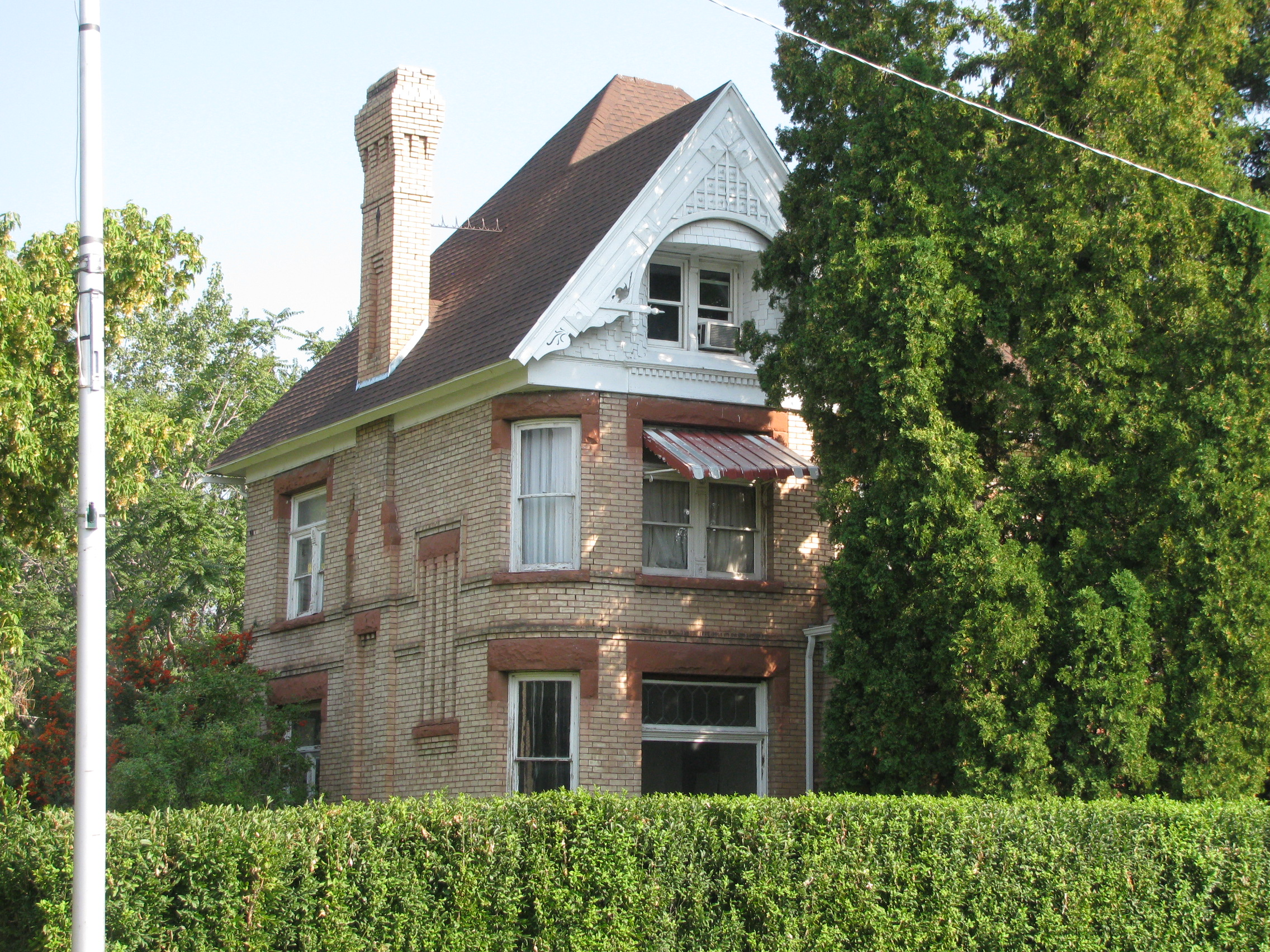

- Location within Utah Location within the United States
- Location: 248 North Main Street; Payson, Utah; United States
- Coordinates: 40°2′46″N 111°43′52″W
- Area: less than one acre
- Built: 1899
- Architectural style: Queen Anne, Eclectic Victorian
- NRHP reference No.: 77001319
- Added to NRHP: November 7, 1977

The Christopher F. Dixon Jr. House is a historic house located in Payson, Utah, United States. It was listed on the National Register of Historic Places on November 7, 1977.

== Description and history ==
The house was constructed of brick, stone and native wood in 1899 as a home for Christopher Flintoff Dlxon Jr. (b. 1861 in Ohio) whose family arrived in Payson in 1862 as pioneer Mormon settlers. He did well in cattle and wheat and eventually arranged to have this eclectic Victorian home built. It is a local landmark.

It is also a contributing building in the Payson Historic District, which was listed on the National Register in 2007.

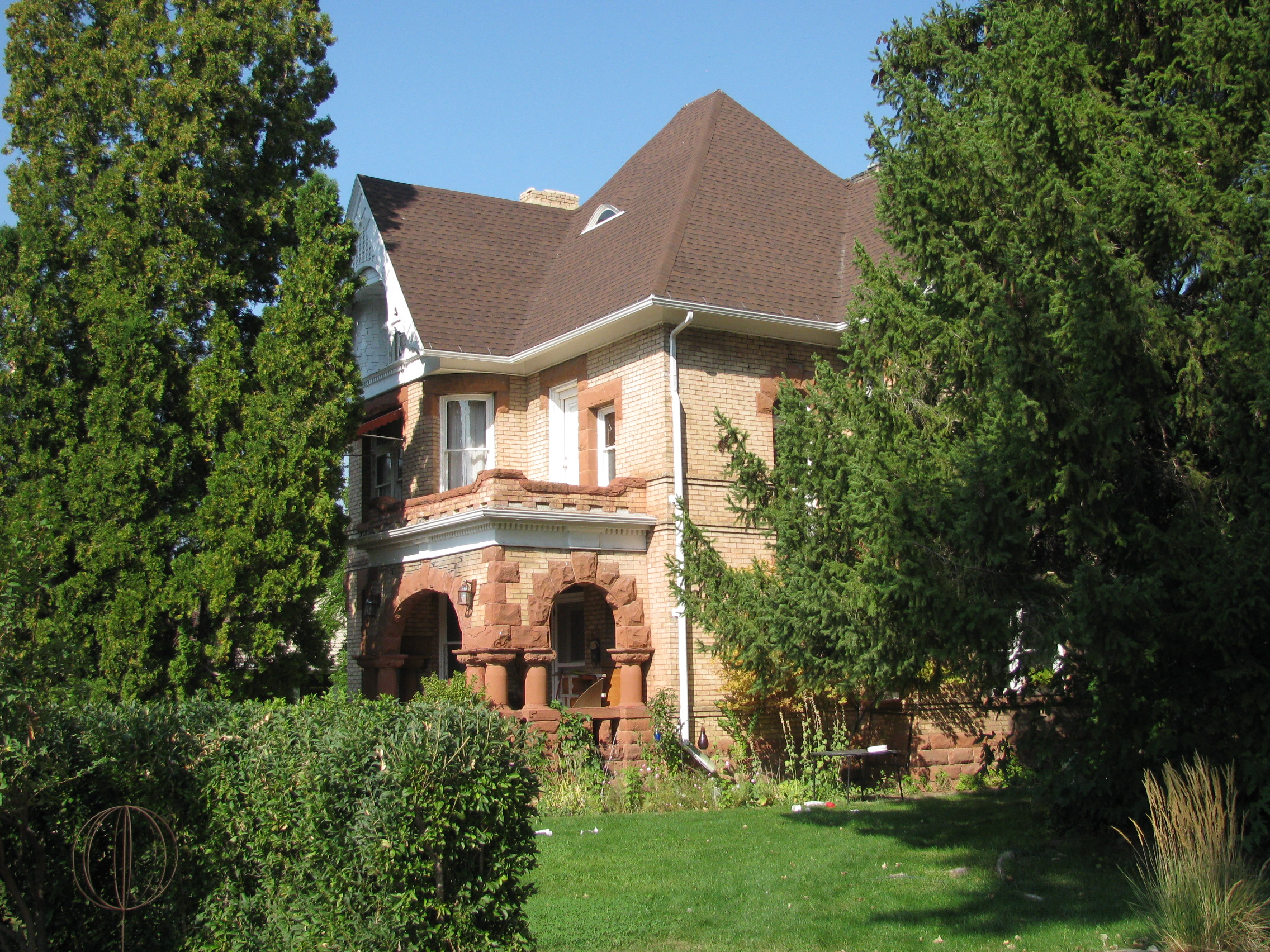

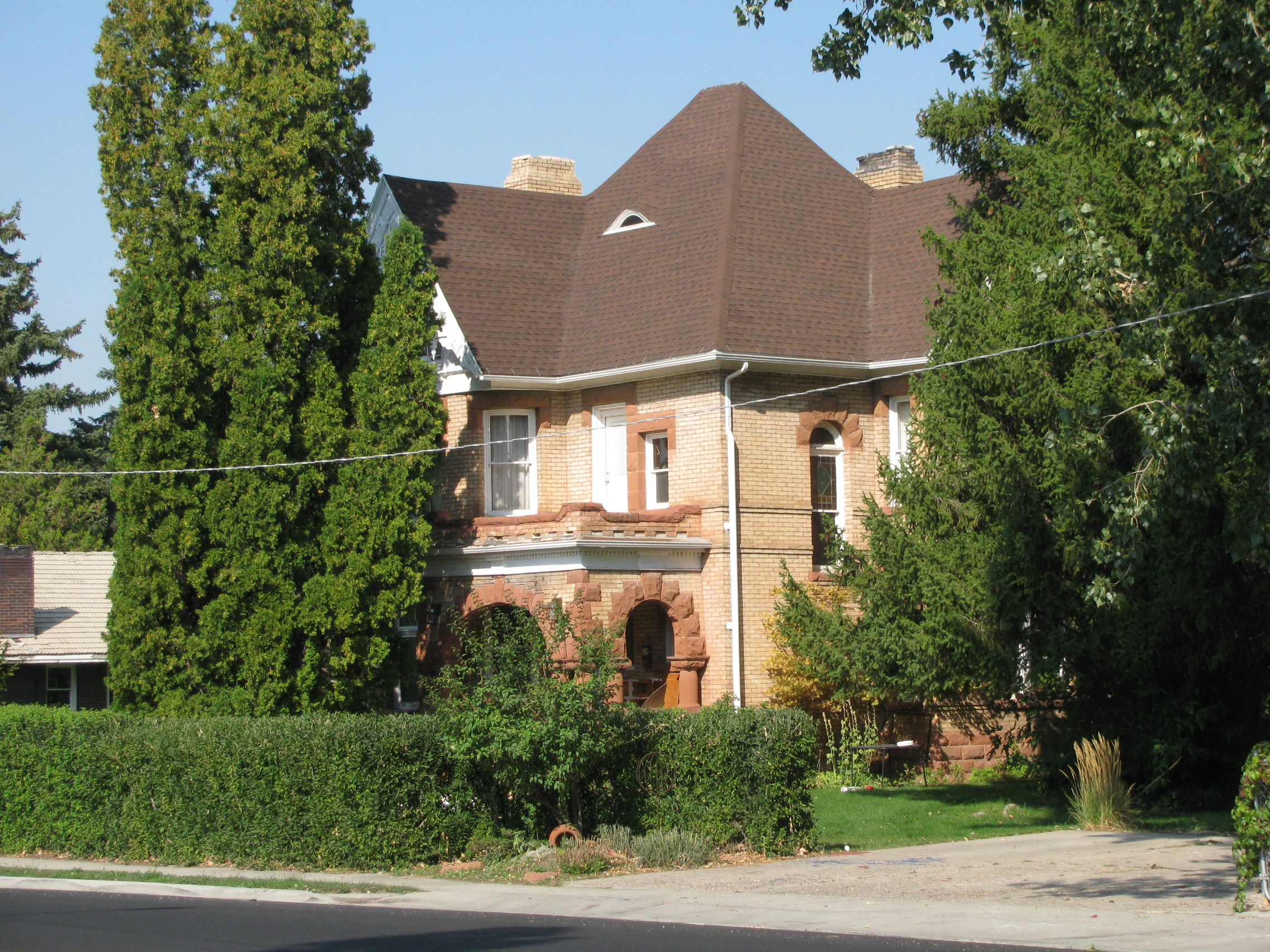

== See also ==
- National Register of Historic Places listings in Utah County, Utah
- John Dixon House, also NRHP-listed in Payson
