= Samuel Douglass House =

Historic house in Utah, United States

- U.S. National Register of Historic Places
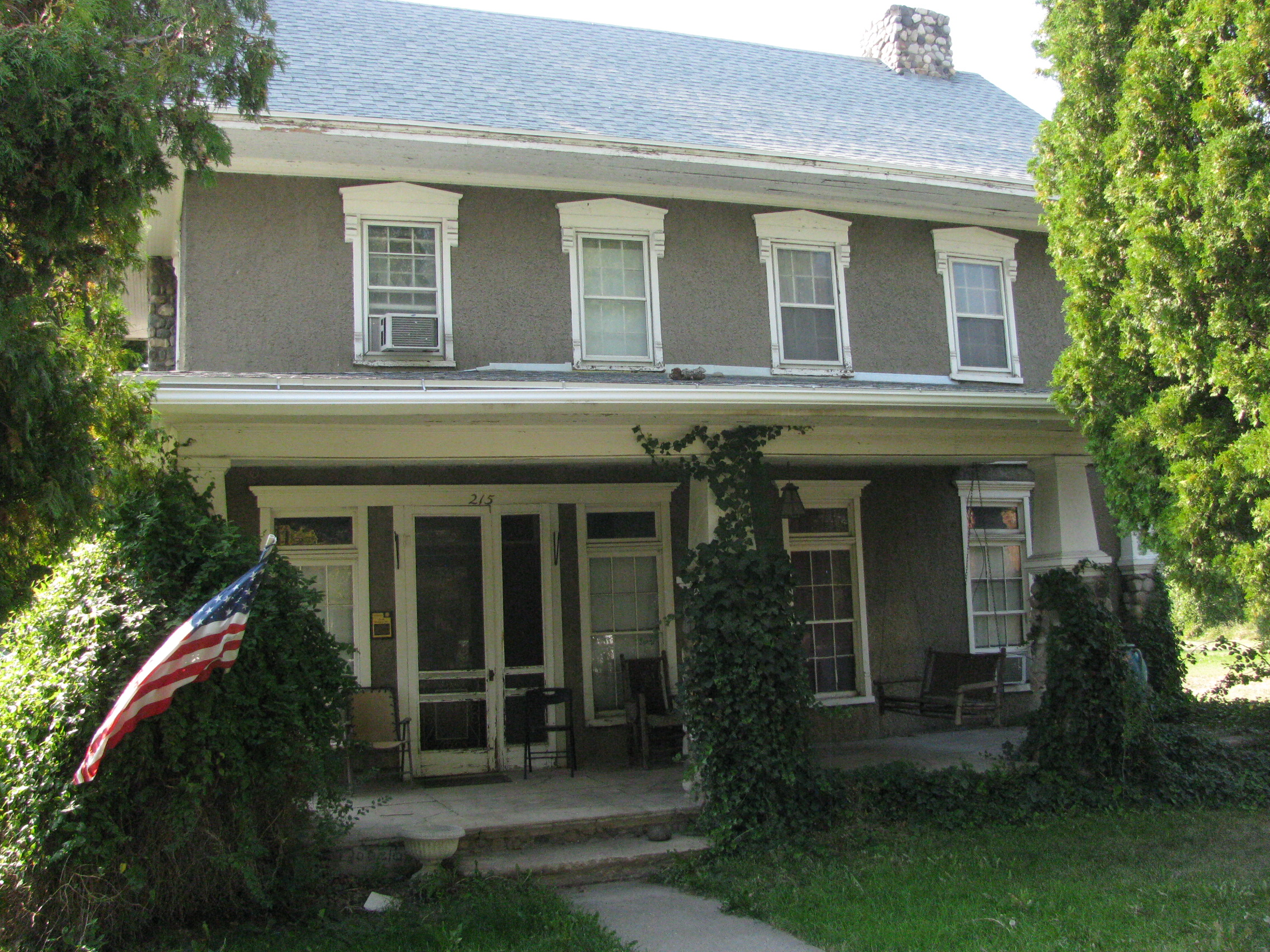

- Location within Utah Location within the United States
- Location: 215 North Main Street, Payson, Utah; United States
- Coordinates: 40°2′45″N 111°43′54″W
- Area: 0.6 acres (0.24 ha)
- Built: 1874
- Built by: Douglass, Samuel
- Architectural style: Mid 19th Century Revival, Bungalow/craftsman
- NRHP reference No.: 92001059
- Added to NRHP: August 21, 1992

The Samuel Douglass House is a historic house located at 215 North Main Street in Payson, Utah, United States. It was updated to include Bungalow/craftsman architecture in 1912, and won a high school civics class award.

== Description ==
The 2 1/2-story house was built in 1874, and has since been substantially altered. It was listed on the National Register of Historic Places on August 21, 1992. It is also a contributing building in the Payson Historic District, which was listed on the National Register in 2007.

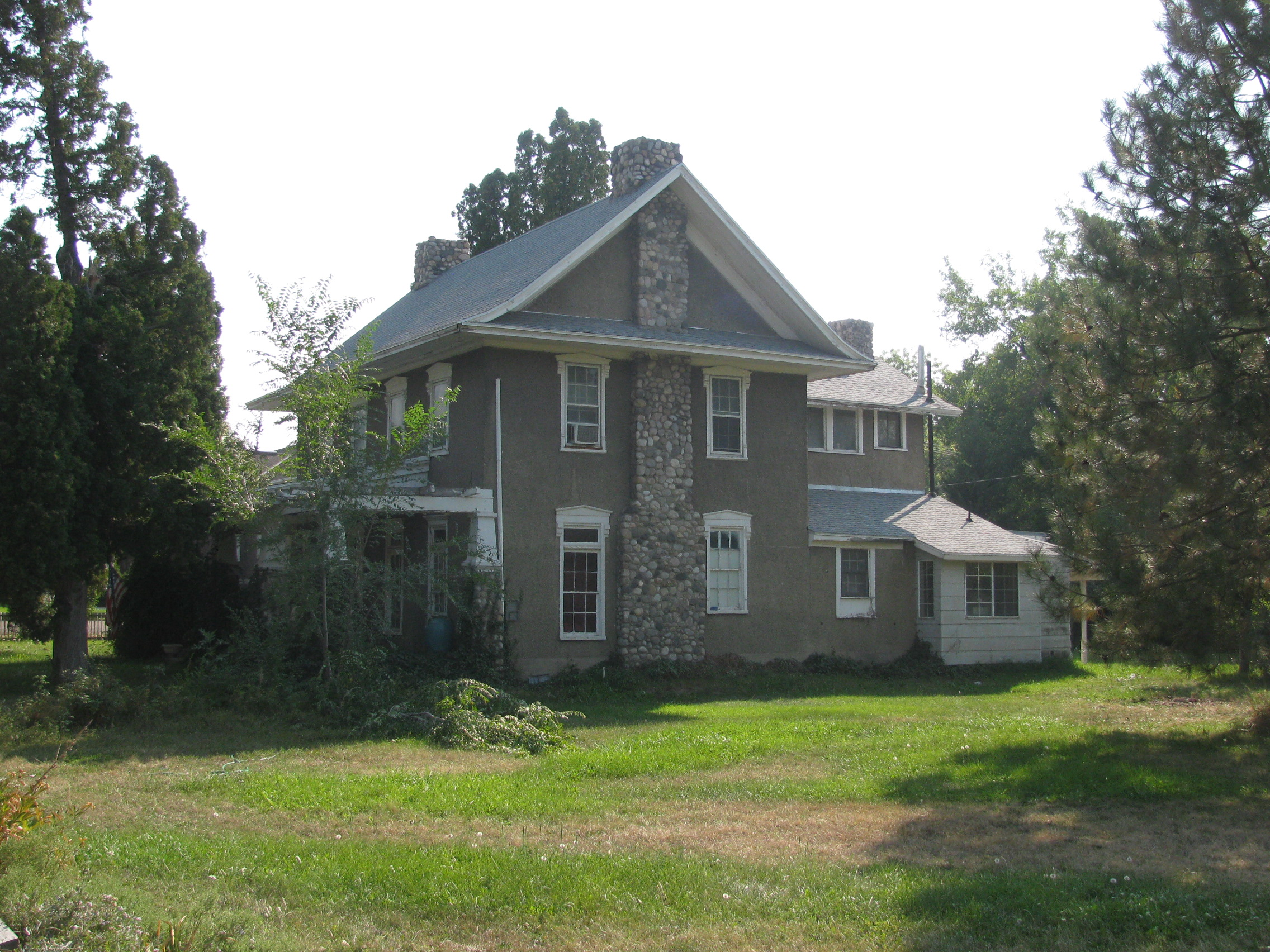

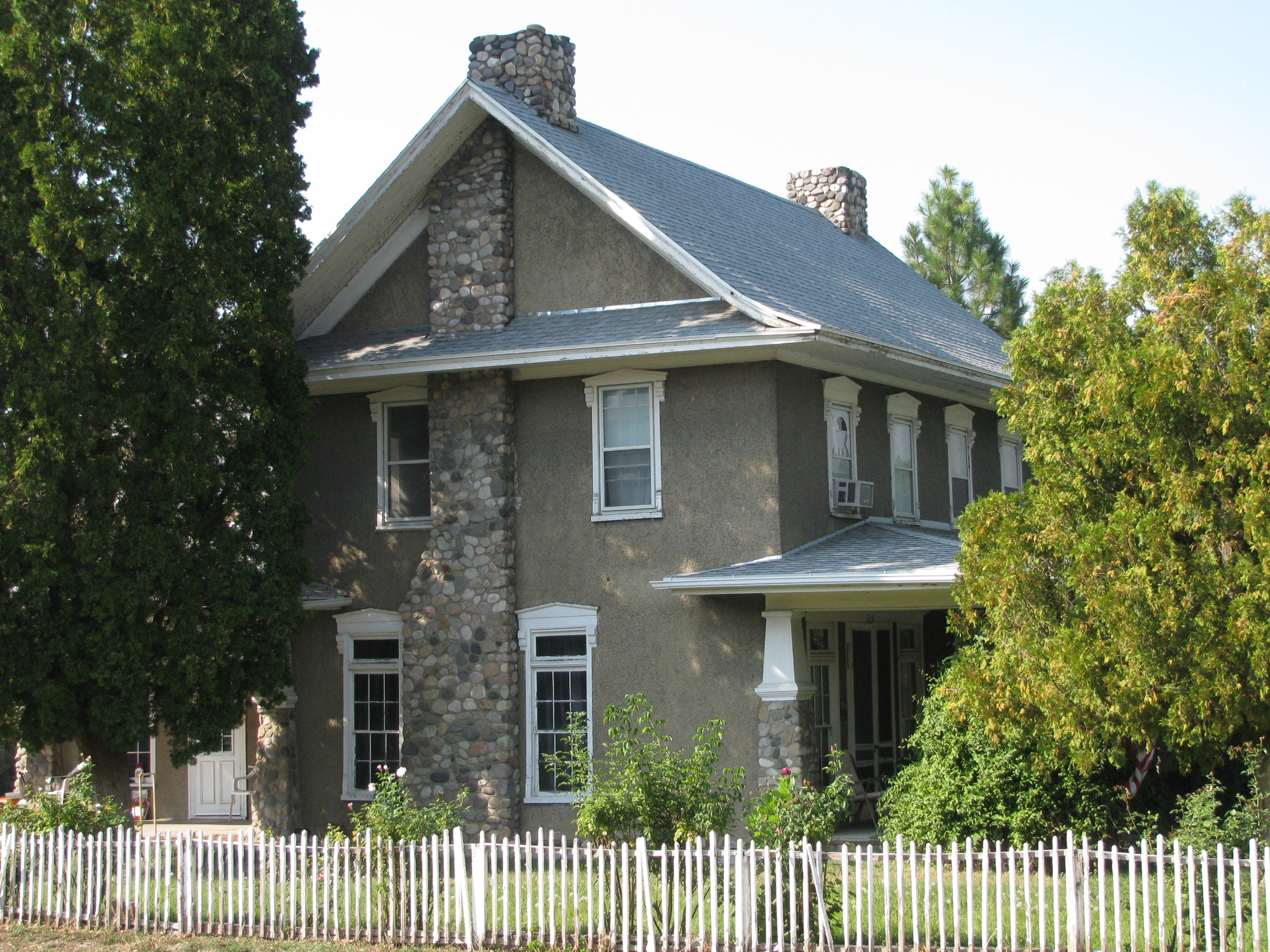

== See also ==
- National Register of Historic Places in Utah County, Utah
