= Douglas House (Vaughn, Arkansas) =

Historic house in Arkansas, United States

- Formerly listed on the U.S. National Register of Historic Places
- Location within Arkansas Location within the United States
- Nearest city: Vaughn, Arkansas
- Coordinates: 36°15′20″N 94°20′10″W
- Area: less than one acre
- Built: 1890
- Architectural style: Double-Pen;Duple
- MPS: Benton County MRA
- NRHP reference No.: 87002372

Significant dates
- Added to NRHP: January 28, 1988
- Removed from NRHP: October 7, 2026

The Douglas House is a historic house in rural Benton County, Arkansas. It is located on a county road, 0.8 miles (1.3 km) east of Arkansas Highway 12, about 0.8 miles (1.3 km) north of its junction with Arkansas Highway 264. It is a 1 1/2-story vernacular double pen frame house with a side gable roof and a rear wing. Its main facade lacks both windows and doors, which are found on the gable ends and to the rear. It also has a hip-roofed porch supported by turned columns. The house was built c. 1890, and is a little-altered example of this once-common regional form.

The house was listed on the National Register of Historic Places in 1988.

== See also ==
- National Register of Historic Places listings in Benton County, Arkansas
