= Mordecai Puryear House =

Historic house in Tennessee, United States

- U.S. National Register of Historic Places
- Location within Tennessee Location within the United States
- Location: Lewisburg Pike, 2/10 mi. N of Henpeck Ln., Franklin, Tennessee
- Coordinates: 35°52′25″N 86°50′35″W
- Area: 4 acres (1.6 ha)
- Built: c. 1830
- Architectural style: Federal, central hall plan
- MPS: Williamson County MRA
- NRHP reference No.: 88000340
- Added to NRHP: April 13, 1988

The Mordecai Puryear House is a center-hall house in Franklin, Tennessee, United States, built around 1830. Mordecai Puryear was one of the ten original investors in the National Bank of Franklin in 1871. The bank "was one of the primary financial institutions of the county" until it failed in 1926.

The property was listed on the National Register of Historic Places in 1988. At the time of listing it included two contributing buildings on an area of 4 acres (1.6 ha). The house has been included in a tour of historic Franklin houses.

The house was built circa 1830 and was expanded twice, around 1850 and in 1907.
