= Alfred Douglass House =

Historic house in Massachusetts, United States

- U.S. National Register of Historic Places
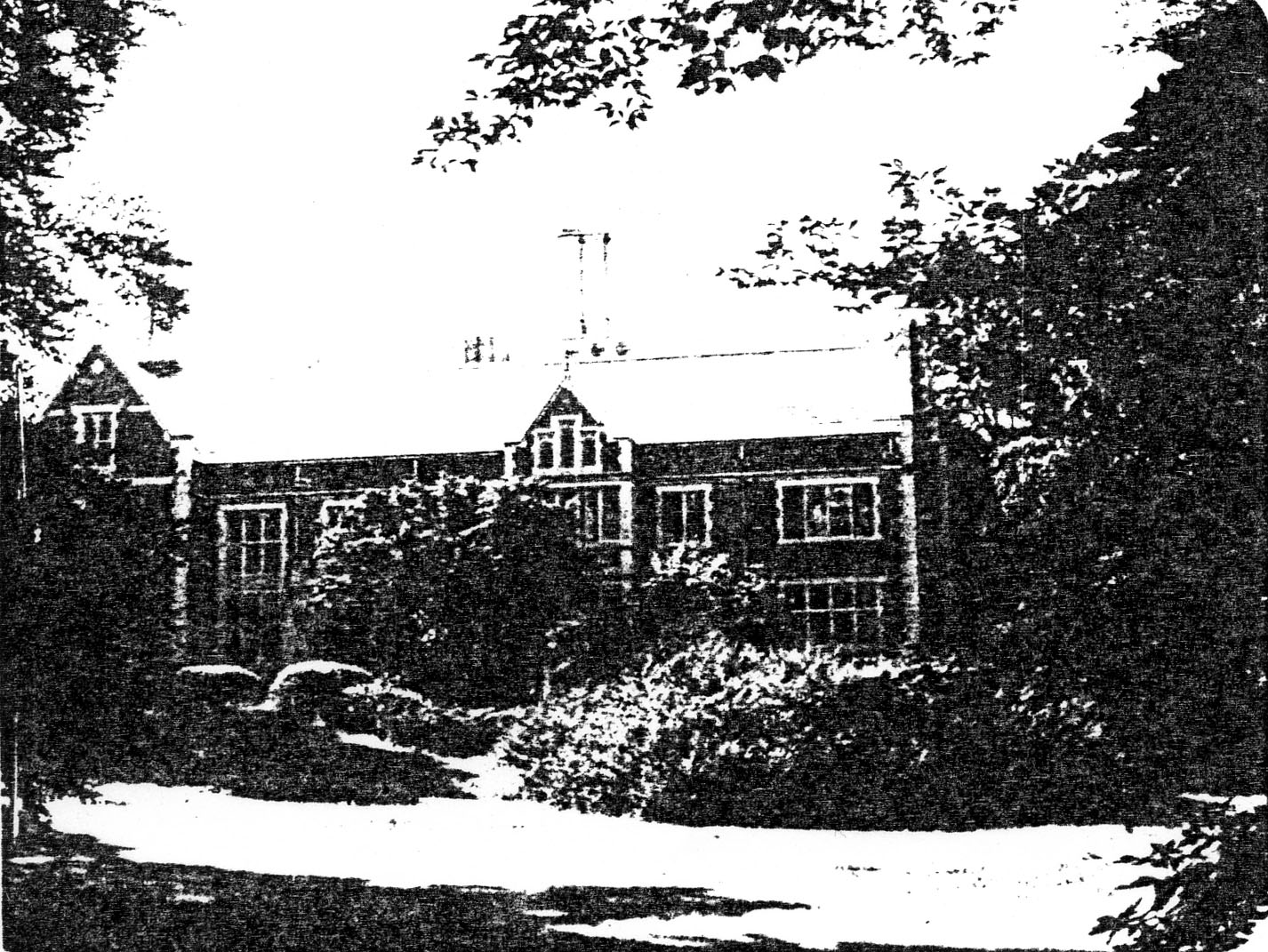

- Location within Massachusetts Location within the United States
- Location: 76 Fernwood Rd., Brookline, Massachusetts
- Coordinates: 42.31139°N 71.14249°W
- Built: 1910
- Architect: Patch, Charles; Olmsted Bros.
- Architectural style: Medieval Revival
- MPS: Brookline MRA
- NRHP reference No.: 85003261
- Added to NRHP: October 17, 1985

The Alfred Douglass House was a historic house at 76 Fernwood Road in Brookline, Massachusetts, United States. It was built in 1910 as servant quarters for the Fernwood estate of Alfred Douglass. It was a prominent surviving example of Jacobethan architecture in Brookline, and an unusual surviving outbuilding from one of the town's early 20th century country estates. The house was listed on the National Register of Historic Places in 1985. It has since been demolished and replaced by new construction.

== Description and history ==
The Alfred Douglass House stood in southern Brookline's Buttonwood Village area, in the northwest corner of the former Fernwood estate. The estate has been subdivided, and this house would have been accessed via the main drive through the former estate (now Fernwood Road), and was set near the northwest corner of the property. It was a 2 1/2-story wood-frame structure, with a stuccoed and half-timbered exterior. Its front facade was characterized by three large gables, decorated with Gothic bargeboard, finials and drops, and had a main entrance under a gabled hood with large brackets.

The house was designed by Charles Patch, and built in 1910 for Alfred Douglass, a retired New York merchant. Douglass had purchased the country estate from Caroline and William Gardiner; she was the daughter of Thomas Handasyd Perkins, whose estate was next door. This house served as the servant quarters for his Fernwood estate house. It was enlarged in 1930 by Sidney W. Winslow Jr and converted from a duplex to a single family residence. His son lived there for several years.

== See also ==
- National Register of Historic Places listings in Brookline, Massachusetts
