= Douglas House, Westminster =

Douglas House
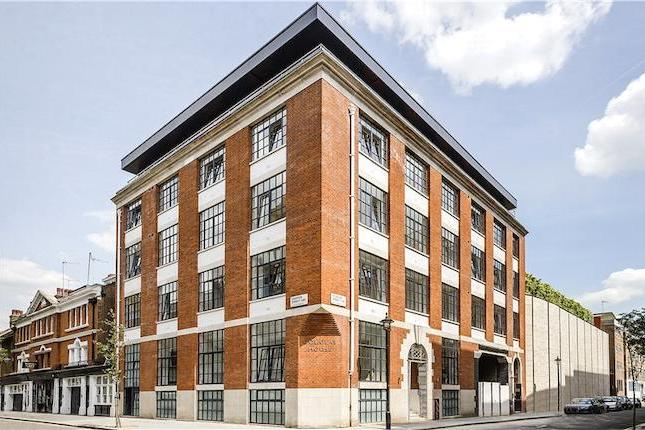
- Interactive map of the Douglas House area

General information
- Type: Hotel
- Architectural style: eclectic classical style with English Baroque details and French touches
- Location: London, England
- Coordinates: 51°30′41.3″N 0°10′55.5″W
- Current tenants: Lancaster Gate Hotel
- Completed: c. 1866

Technical details
- Floor count: 7

The Douglas House was a US servicemen's club operated by the United States Air Force for twenty-five years at two different locations in London's West End. The club's purpose was to provide "home-style service" for the thousands of American airmen based in the United Kingdom and US servicemen of all branches who might be passing through. The first location opened after the Second World War in Mayfair. In 1959 the Douglas House was relocated to Lancaster Gate, near Hyde Park. In the early 1960s, its nightclub served as a springboard for the budding career of a nascent London band called the Detours, that later went on to greater fame as The Who. When the club closed in 1970, the property was sold to a private firm.

== Location ==
The original Douglas House, which opened either during or after the Second World War, occupied the former Guards Club building at 41–43 Brook Street in Mayfair. The second Douglas House was located at 66 Lancaster Gate, W2, in the Bayswater/Hyde Park district of London, one block north of Hyde Park and Kensington Gardens and the actual Lancaster Gate on Bayswater Road.

== Amenities ==
The facilities of the first Douglas House included volleyball, handball, and badminton courts and evening cabarets and dances. The second Douglas House, on Lancaster Gate, had 110 low-cost hotel rooms for families as well as singles, a restaurant, nightclub, soda bar, four-chair barber shop, TV lounge, bureau de change, and a newsstand that sold American periodicals. One former serviceman remembered that the restaurant, which "specialized in steaks, spaghetti and meatballs, chicken wings, ham, roasts, and baked and fried chicken," was "the best place [in London] for American food."

== History ==
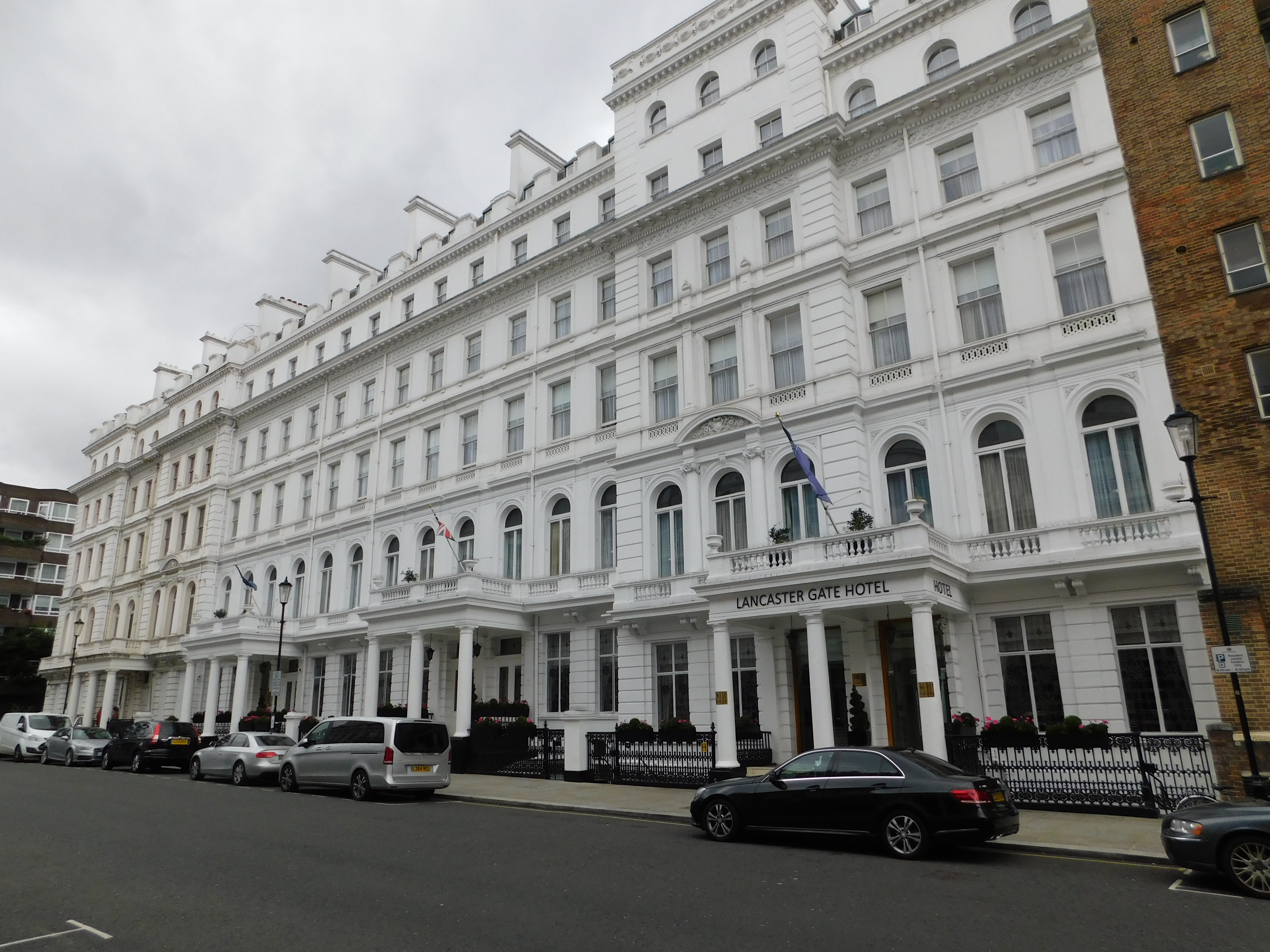
Lancaster Gate Hotel (formerly the Douglas House)

The first Douglas House opened in the former Guards Club on Brook Street, W1, either during or immediately after the Second World War as a leave centre for US servicemen. The building that housed the second club was originally a block of white stuccoed flats or townhouses built in the Victorian era as part of a Bayswater area real estate development. After the Air Force acquired the property, the Douglas House began operating on 2 May 1959. It was jointly named for Air Force Secretary James H. Douglas, Jr. and Lewis Williams Douglas, a former US ambassador to Great Britain. In 1960, in honour of the marriage of Princess Margaret and Anthony Armstrong Jones, the club attracted attention by offering free dinners on the royal wedding day, 6 May, to any serviceman named Tony who had a wife named Margaret. That same year, the Douglas House sponsored an Independence Day celebration in Battersea Gardens that attracted thousands of American servicemen and their families. In November 1960 the club hosted an all-night presidential election watch party. In late 1962 a five-piece London band called the Detours played several dates at the Douglas House nightclub. Later, after changing their name to The Who, the group went on to become of one Great Britain's most popular and successful rock bands. On 12 June 1963, Country and Western singer Jim Reeves also performed at the Douglas House. In 1970 the Douglas House was sold by Druce and Company to Adda Hotels, which later remodelled the property and then reopened it as the 188-room full-service Charles Dickens Hotel. In 1999, the property was acquired by Ryan Hotels for £16.9 million. Following further remodelling, it was operated as the Hyde Park Gresham Hotel until 2007 when it became the Park Inn Hotel. Presently, the property is known as the Lancaster Gate Hotel (not to be confused with the nearby Lancaster, London).

== Blue plaque ==
A blue plaque, attached to the Leinster Terrace end of the building in 1977, commemorates American author Bret Harte, who resided and died at 74 Lancaster Gate in 1902.
