= George B. Douglas House =

Historic house in Iowa, United States

- U.S. National Register of Historic Places
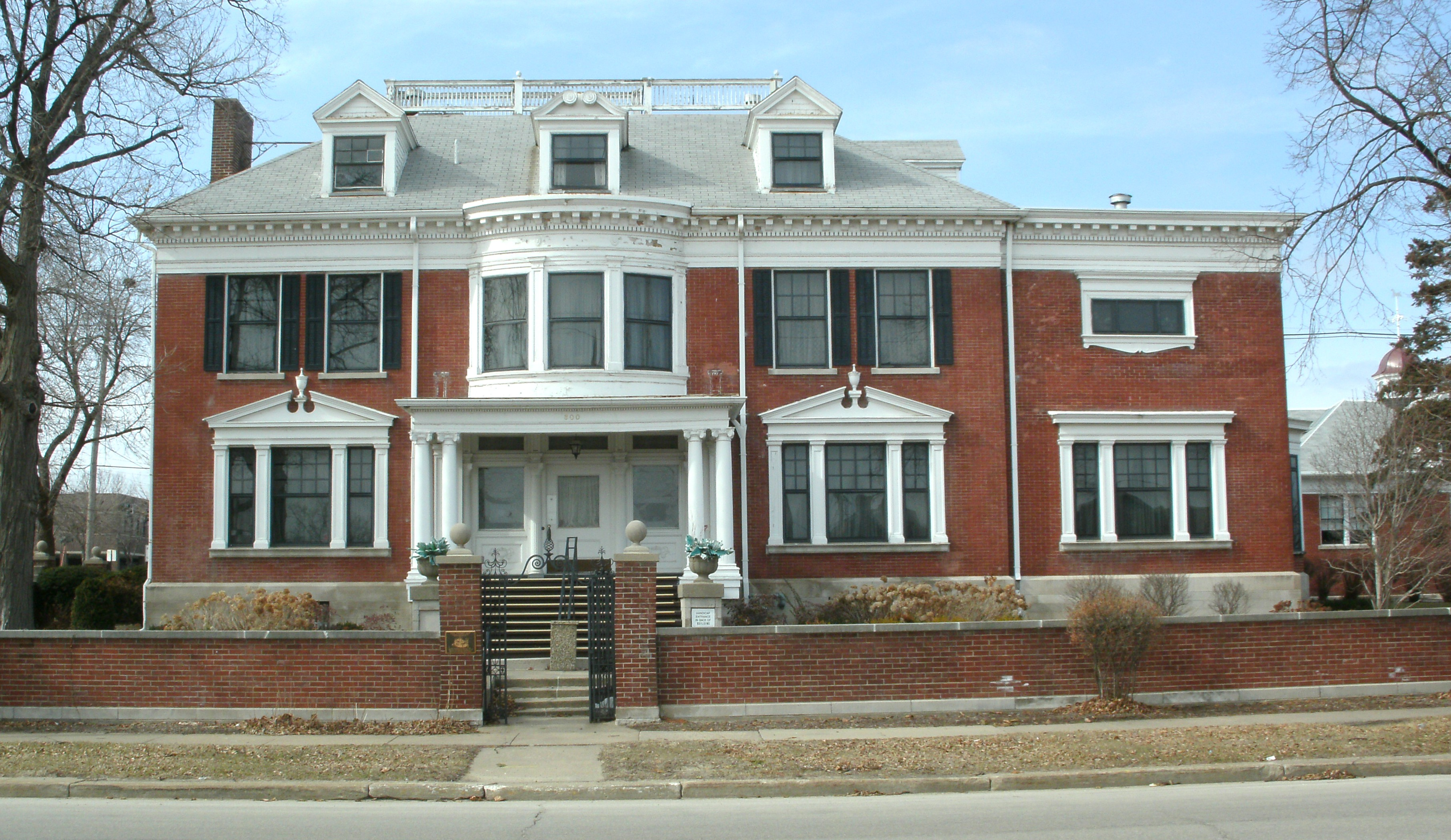

- Location within Iowa Location within the United States
- Location: 800 2nd Ave., SE; Cedar Rapids, Iowa
- Coordinates: 41°58′55.5″N 91°39′39.9″W
- Area: less than one acre
- Built: 1897
- Architectural style: Colonial Revival
- NRHP reference No.: 82002628
- Added to NRHP: September 9, 1982

The George B. Douglas House, which later became known as Turner Mortuary East, is owned today by The History Center, Linn County Historical Society. This historic building located in Cedar Rapids, Iowa, United States. The house was built for Douglas who was a partner in a cereal mill that became the Quaker Oats Company. David Turner bought the property in 1924 and converted the house into a funeral home. He was a patron of regionalist artist Grant Wood, and Turner leased the carriage house to him from 1924 to 1933. Wood used it as his residence, along with his mother, and as a studio. It was here at #5 Turner Alley that he painted two of his most famous paintings, American Gothic (1930) and Stone City (1930). Wood also worked as a decorator when he lived here and designed the interior of the main house when it was converted into a funeral home. His work included two stained glass windows that flank the main entrance. Several Wood paintings also hung in the funeral home.

The house is a 2½-story, brick Georgian Revival structure. It features a symmetrical facade and a hipped roof with three gable dormers. The symmetry, however, was undone by the addition built onto the northeast side. It was designed by local architect Bruce McKay and Grant Wood. Wood is thought to have designed the bay window for the first-floor chapel. Other additions were built onto the back of the structure. The house was listed on the National Register of Historic Places in 1982.
