= John S. Douglas House =

Historic house in Pennsylvania, United States

- U.S. National Register of Historic Places
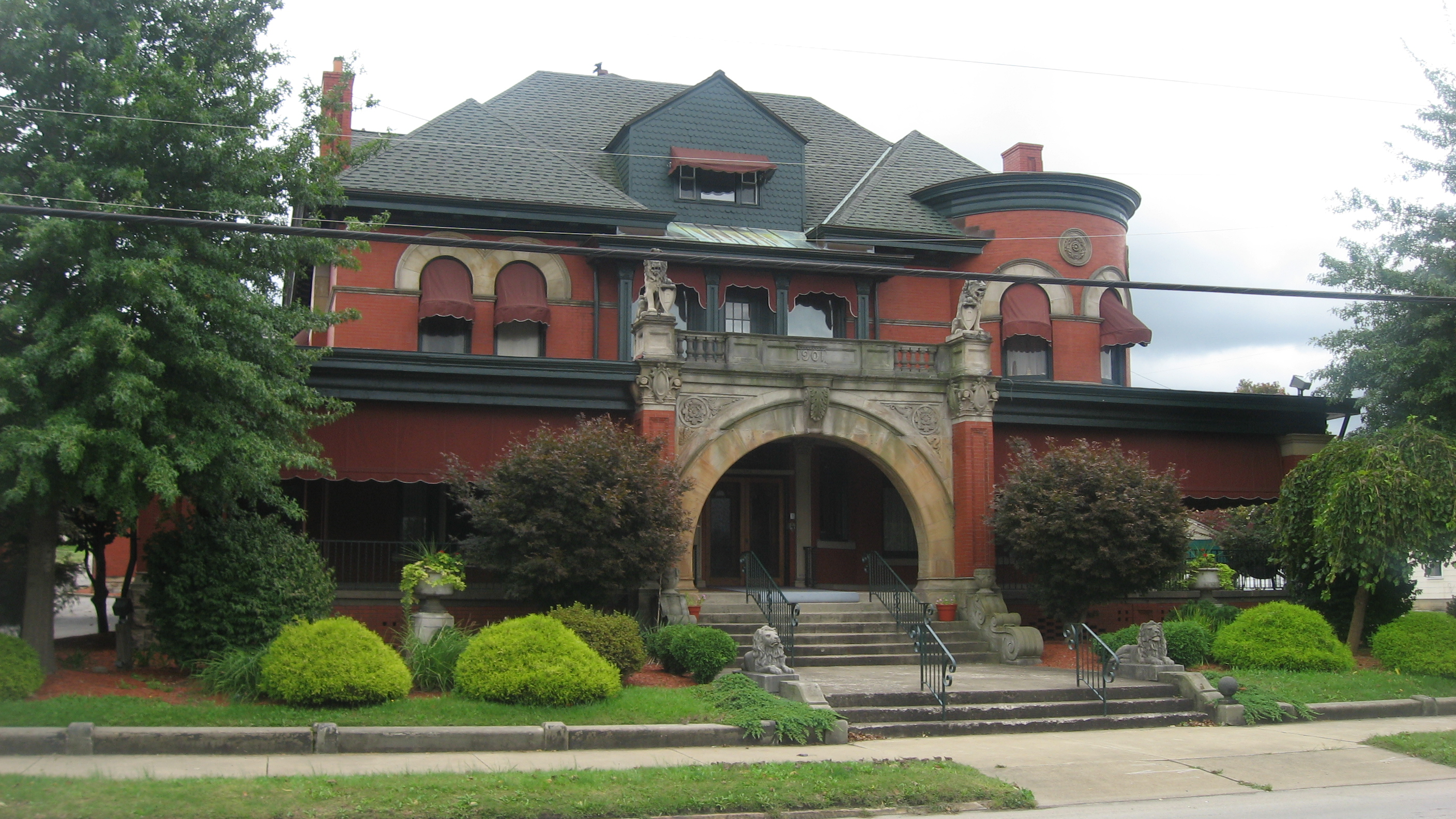
- John S. Douglas House, September 2011

- Location within Pennsylvania Location within the United States
- Location: 136 N. Gallatin Ave., Uniontown, Pennsylvania
- Coordinates: 39°54′17″N 79°43′23″W
- Area: less than one acre
- Built: 1901
- Architectural style: Romanesque
- NRHP reference No.: 94000006
- Added to NRHP: February 4, 1994

John S. Douglas House, also known as Gates Funeral Home and Crematory LLC, is a historic home located at Uniontown, Pennsylvania Uniontown, Fayette County, Pennsylvania.

It was added to the National Register of Historic Places in 1994.

== History ==
It was built in 1901, and is a large 2 1/2-story, brick dwelling with a two-story rear wing added in 1967. The house is in the Richardsonian Romanesque style, with Chateauesque elements. It is five-bays wide and has a wraparound porch and porte cochere. The front facade features rounded arched windows with wide cut stone arches. Also on the property is a contributing carriage house.
