= Bennink-Douglas Cottages =

Historic houses in Massachusetts, United States

- U.S. National Register of Historic Places
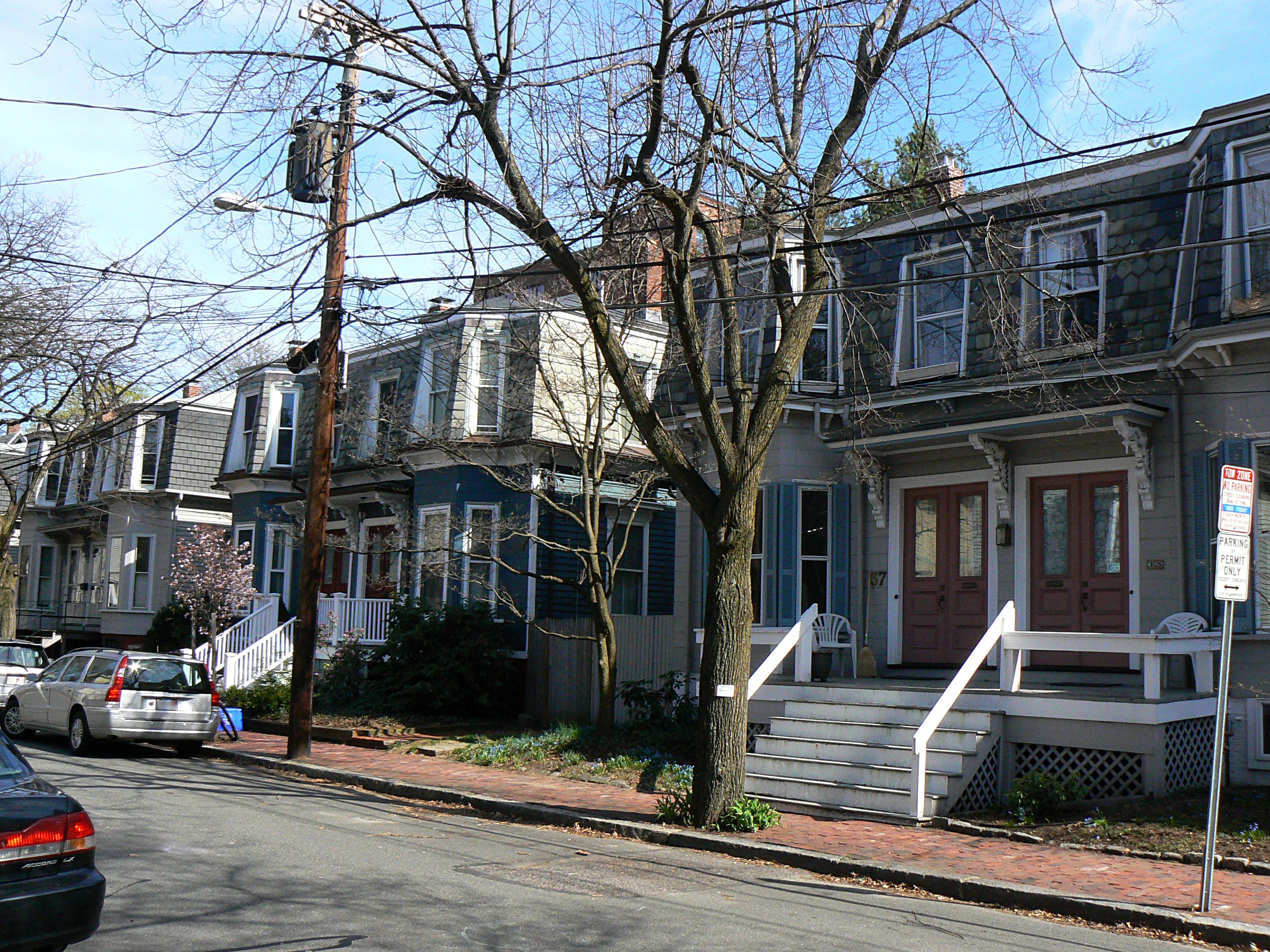

- Location within Massachusetts Location within the United States
- Location: 35–51 Walker St., Cambridge, Massachusetts
- Coordinates: 42°22′48.0″N 71°07′22.9″W
- Area: less than one acre
- Built: 1874
- Built by: G.J. Bennink, W.G. Douglas
- Architectural style: Second Empire
- MPS: Cambridge MRA
- NRHP reference No.: 86001272
- Added to NRHP: May 19, 1986

The Bennink-Douglas Cottages are a collection of four historic worker duplexes in Cambridge, Massachusetts. Built in 1874 as a speculative venture, they typify the housing built for low and middle-income workers in the 1870s. They were listed on the National Register of Historic Places in 1986.

== Description and history ==
The Bennink-Douglas Cottages are located in an densely built residential area between the Cambridge Common and the Radcliffe Quadrangle, on the south side of Walker Street. The four buildings are each 1 1/2-story wood-frame structure on brick foundations, with mansard roofs that provide a full second floor. Each cottage is four bays wide, with two entrances in the center bays and polygonal projecting window bays in the outer bays, rising through the mansard level. The steep sections of the roofs feature hexagonal slate shingles. Three of the four have bracketed hoods sheltering the entrances; the fourth had its porch rebuilt in the Colonial Revival style. The roof eaves also have paired Italianate brackets.

The four cottages were built in 1874 as a speculative venture by Gerritt Bennink and William Douglas for sale as low-to-middle-cost housing for workers. Their style was typical of low-cost housing built during the 1870s throughout Cambridge, a period in which the city experienced rapid growth; by the late 1880s, the triple-decker became a more common low-cost construction. The exteriors of these four buildings have, for the most part, retained their original appearance. The land on which they were built was subdivided for development in 1868; it had been pasture land before then.

== See also ==
- National Register of Historic Places listings in Cambridge, Massachusetts
