= Douglas House (Lovells Township, Michigan) =

Historic house in Michigan, United States

- Douglas Hotel
- U.S. National Register of Historic Places
- Michigan State Historic Site
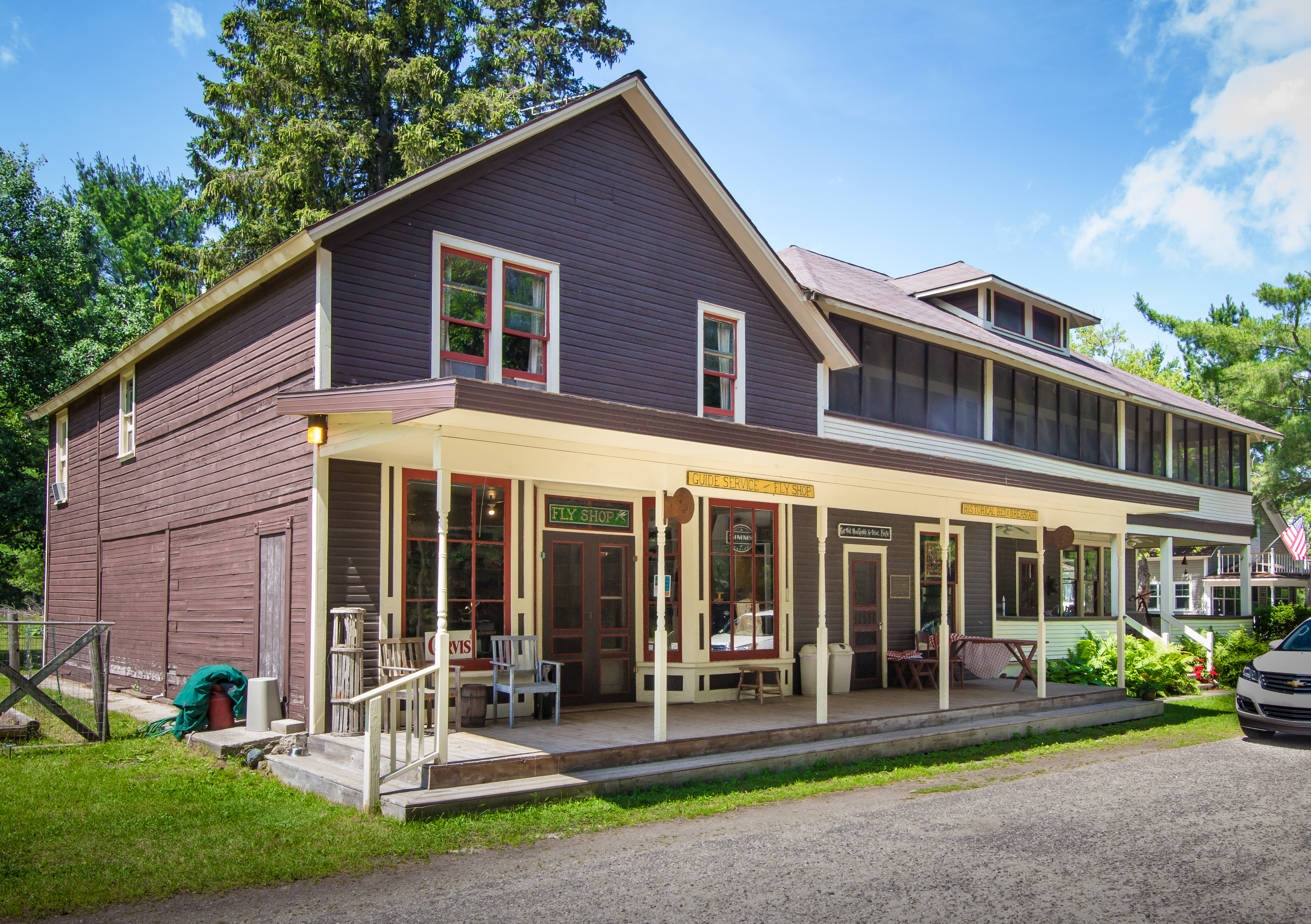

- Location within Michigan Location within the United States
- Interactive map
- Location: 6122 E Cty Rd. 612, Lovells Township, Michigan
- Coordinates: 44°48′8″N 84°28′57″W
- Area: 5 acres (2.0 ha)
- Built: 1916
- Architectural style: Prairie, Victorian
- NRHP reference No.: 01001017

Significant dates
- Added to NRHP: September 23, 2001
- Designated MSHS: November 18, 2000

The Douglas House, also known as the Douglas Hotel or the North Branch Outing Club, is a sporting lodge located at 6122 East County Road 612 in Lovells Township, Michigan. It was designated a Michigan State Historic Site in 2000 and listed on the National Register of Historic Places in 2001.

== History ==
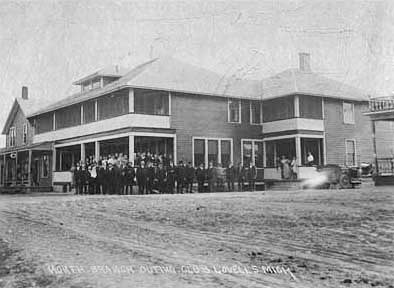
Trout opener, c.1916

Thomas E. Douglas was born and educated in Canada, and moved the Michigan to come to work as a bookkeeper in his uncle's lumber mill in Saginaw. In 1893, he moved to Grayling to manage the R. Hansen Lumber Company. Riding the wave of the lumber boom, in 1898 Douglas built a sawmill and general store in what was then the small logging community of Lovells. Fire destroyed the general store in 1903, and Douglas built a new store. In 1916, as the lumbering era was winding down, he constructed the Douglas House and established the North Branch Outing Club to draw tourists to the area. He used electricity generated in his mill to power the hotel. With the rise in the usage of the automobile, Douglas targeted wealthy travelers as club members, and drew members from the new Detroit automobile aristocracy such as Henry Ford and his son Edsel, John and Horace Dodge, and Charles Nash. Douglas had his daughter Margaret manage the hotel, a position which she occupied until it closed in 1971. Margaret continued to live in the hotel until her death. In 1996, the Douglas House reopened as a sporting lodge known as "North Branch Outing Club."

== Description ==
The Douglas House is a two-story, wood frame, hipped-roof structure covered with clapboard. The inside has 20 guest rooms and lavish common spaces which have been altered very little.
