= Churchill County Courthouse =

- U.S. National Register of Historic Places
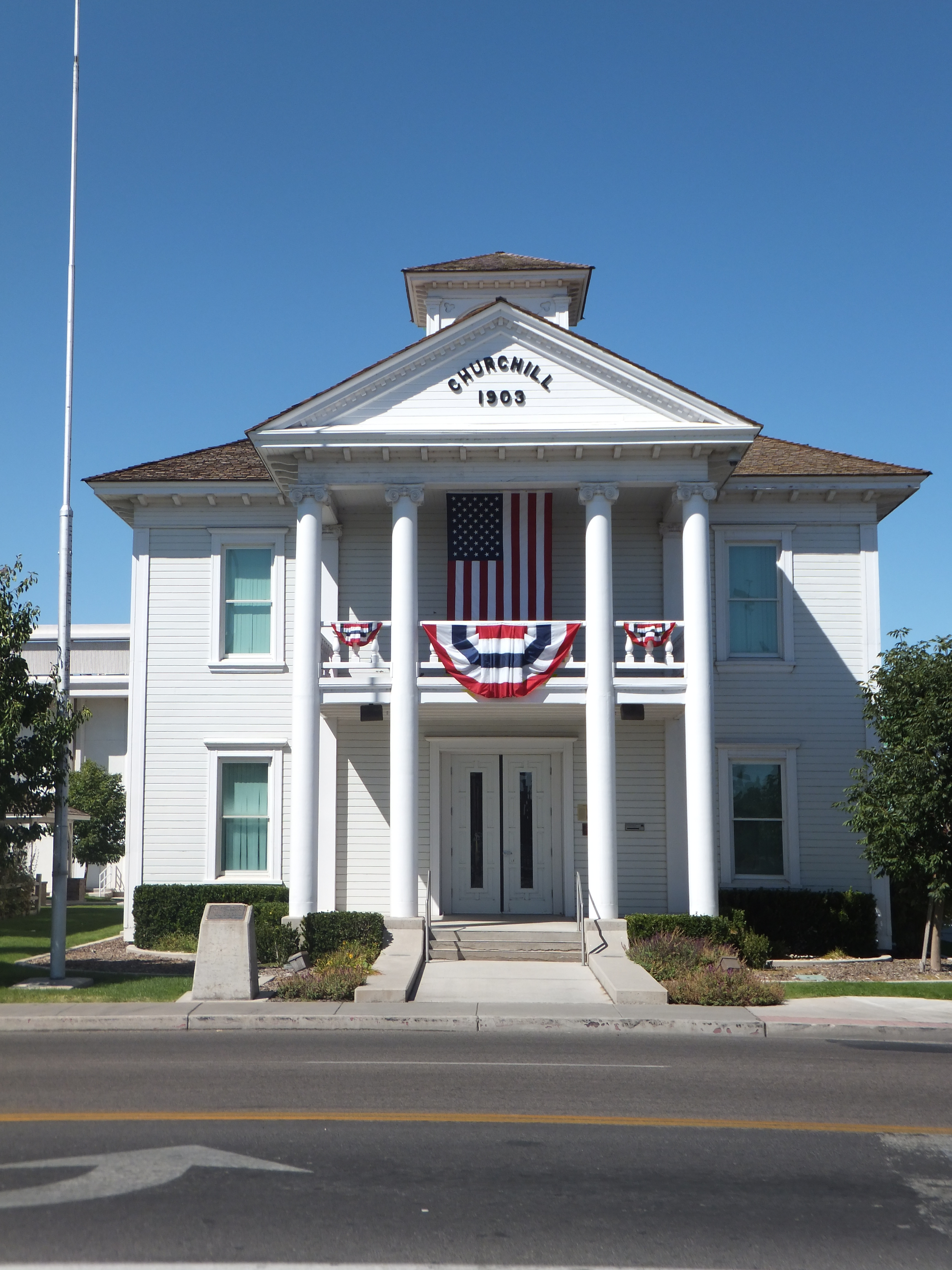

- Location within Nevada Location within the United States
- Interactive map showing the location of Churchill County Courthouse
- Location: 10 W. Williams Ave., Fallon, Nevada
- Coordinates: 39°28′30″N 118°46′38″W
- Area: less than one acre
- Built: 1903
- Built by: Wyrick, W.B.
- Architect: Leon, Ben
- Architectural style: Classical Revival
- NRHP reference No.: 92001258
- Added to NRHP: September 23, 1992

The Churchill County Courthouse, at 10 W. Williams Avenue in Fallon, Nevada, was erected in 1903. It was designed by Reno, Nevada, architect Ben Leon in Classical Revival style, including a monumental portico with two pairs of columns having Ionic capitals. It served as the county courthouse until 1973 and then was used for offices.

It is significant as "one of the most substantial buildings in Churchill County" and as one of only two surviving frame courthouses in Nevada.

It was listed on the National Register of Historic Places in 1992.
