= Crawford County Avalanche =

Newspaper in Grayling, Michigan

- Type: Weekly newspaper
- Format: Broadsheet
- Owner: Richard Milliman family
- Publisher: Teresa Milliman Brandell
- Editor: Caleb Casey
- Founded: 1879
- Headquarters: 108 Michigan Avenue, Grayling, Michigan 49738, United States
- Circulation: 5,400 (summer); 5,000 (winter) (as of 2022)
- Website: crawfordcountyavalanche.com

The Crawford County Avalanche is a weekly newspaper and website based in Grayling, Michigan published on Thursdays. It calls itself "Grayling's Hometown Newspaper Since 1879" and is the newspaper of record for Crawford County for 144 years. The Chronicling America project of the Library of Congress has images of the newspaper online for the years 1879–1900.

== History ==
The Crawford Avalanche, founded by Masters & (George) Maurer from Mount Pleasant, Michigan, began the paper in May 1879, just as the county was established. The editor was Dr. Simeon C. Brown, from Salt River. In the first issue, the paper declared that it was affiliated with the Republican Party which was dominant in Michigan at the time, and its goal was "developing the new section," i.e., bringing economic prosperity to the county.

Three years later, Oscar Palmer took control and published for more than 80 years. The Milliman family purchased the paper in 1968 and changed the name to Crawford County Avalanche with Richard Milliman as the publisher. As of 2023, the paper is still owned and operated by the Milliman family.

To compete against the "Republican" Avalanche, the Northern Democrat began publishing circa 1887 by Joseph Patterson and Len J. Patterson. In June 1895, ownership changed to Jay Allen and the name was changed to Grayling News. It lasted just over three years, ceasing publication July 7, 1898. The Crawford Avalanche "absorbed" the newspaper.

Due to the location in rural northern Michigan, Crawford County's greatest economic growth occurred in the 1800s when lumbering clear-cut most of the extensive forests. With the trees gone, tourism became the center of the economy. In the 1870s Crawford County became a popular destination for recreational fishing. The Michigan grayling, found in the Au Sable River, first gained the attention of anglers. The Avalanche's first edition featured a fishing story on the front-page. By the end of the century, the grayling species vanished due to a combination of overfishing, river degradation due to logging, and the impact of human-introduced brown trout. The Au Sable River of today boasts large populations of brown and rainbow trout and remains a premiere trout fishing area in both Michigan and the nation.

== Circulation ==
The circulation area of the Avalanche covers all of Crawford County including the city of Grayling, Grayling Charter Township, Beaver Creek Township, Frederic Township, Lovells Township, Maple Forest Township, South Branch Township, and limited portions of Kalkaska, Roscommon and Otsego counties in the northwest lower peninsula. Print circulation during the winter is 5,000; summer is 5,400. Over 10,000 people read the paper each week which is 94% of Crawford County's adults.

== Issues ==
While the economy of Michigan as a whole has been characterized as stagnant or declining, the Grayling area demonstrated marginal population growth in the 2000s. The Grayling area's economy centers on four-season recreation, retirement living, tourism, military, and higher education, and the newspaper covers these concerns. The editorial board often writes aggressively on environmental issues, with a particular emphasis on the ecology of the Au Sable Rivers, expansion of Camp Grayling and political issues.
