= Crawford AuSable School District =

School district in Michigan

Address
- 1135 North Old U.S. 27 Grayling, Crawford County, Michigan, 49738; United States

District information
- Grades: Pre-Kindergarten-12
- Superintendent: Tim Sanchez
- Schools: 4
- Budget: $22,042,000 2021-2022 expenditures
- NCES District ID: 2611030

Students and staff
- Students: 1,641 (2024-2025)
- Teachers: 109.61 (on an FTE basis) (2024-2025)
- Staff: 201.31 FTE (2024-2025)
- Student–teacher ratio: 14.97 (2024-2025)

Other information
- Website: www.casdk12.net

Crawford AuSable School District is a public school district in Northern Michigan. In Crawford County, it serves Grayling and the townships of Frederic, Grayling, Lovells, and Maple Forest and part of the township of Beaver Creek. It also serves part of Bear Lake Township in Kalkaska County and part of Otsego Lake Township in Otsego County.

== History ==
By 1886, a graded school had been established in Grayling. That year was the first commencement of Grayling High School.

In 1906, a newspaper story widely reprinted statewide described the district’s employment rules for teachers, almost all female at the time, which prohibited young women from having a “steady beau” and limited social outings to Friday and Saturday nights. The article reflected contemporary attitudes toward female educators.

The site at 500 Spruce Street in Grayling has long been used for a school. A new brick school building was built there in 1888. It burned down in 1915, and the current building was built in 1916. It held all grades in the district until 1964, when Grayling Elementary was built to house grades six and below.

In the town of Frederic, a high school was built in 1924. Frederic's school district merged with Grayling school district in 1966, and the combined district began using the Crawford AuSable name around this time. Frederic High School students joined Grayling High School. The Frederic school became an elementary building. The 1924 section of the school was torn down in 1976, although other sections of the building continued to be used as an elementary school. The school has been closed.

Rural schoolhouses in the Grayling area were consolidated with the town's district in 1936. One of those schools, the 1907 Lone Pine School in Lovells Township, is now a historical museum.

The current Grayling High School opened in fall 1973, and the former high school became a middle school.

== Schools ==
Schools in Crawford AuSable Schools district
School	Address	Notes
Grayling High School	1135 North Old U.S. 27, Grayling	Grades 9-12. Built 1973.
Grayling Middle School	500 Spruce Street, Grayling	Grades 5-8. Built 1916.
Grayling Elementary	306 Plum Street, Grayling	Grades PreK-4. Built 1964.
Great Lakes Online Education	1135 North Old U.S. 27, Grayling	Online K-12 school
