= Crawford County, Michigan =

County in Michigan, United States

- County
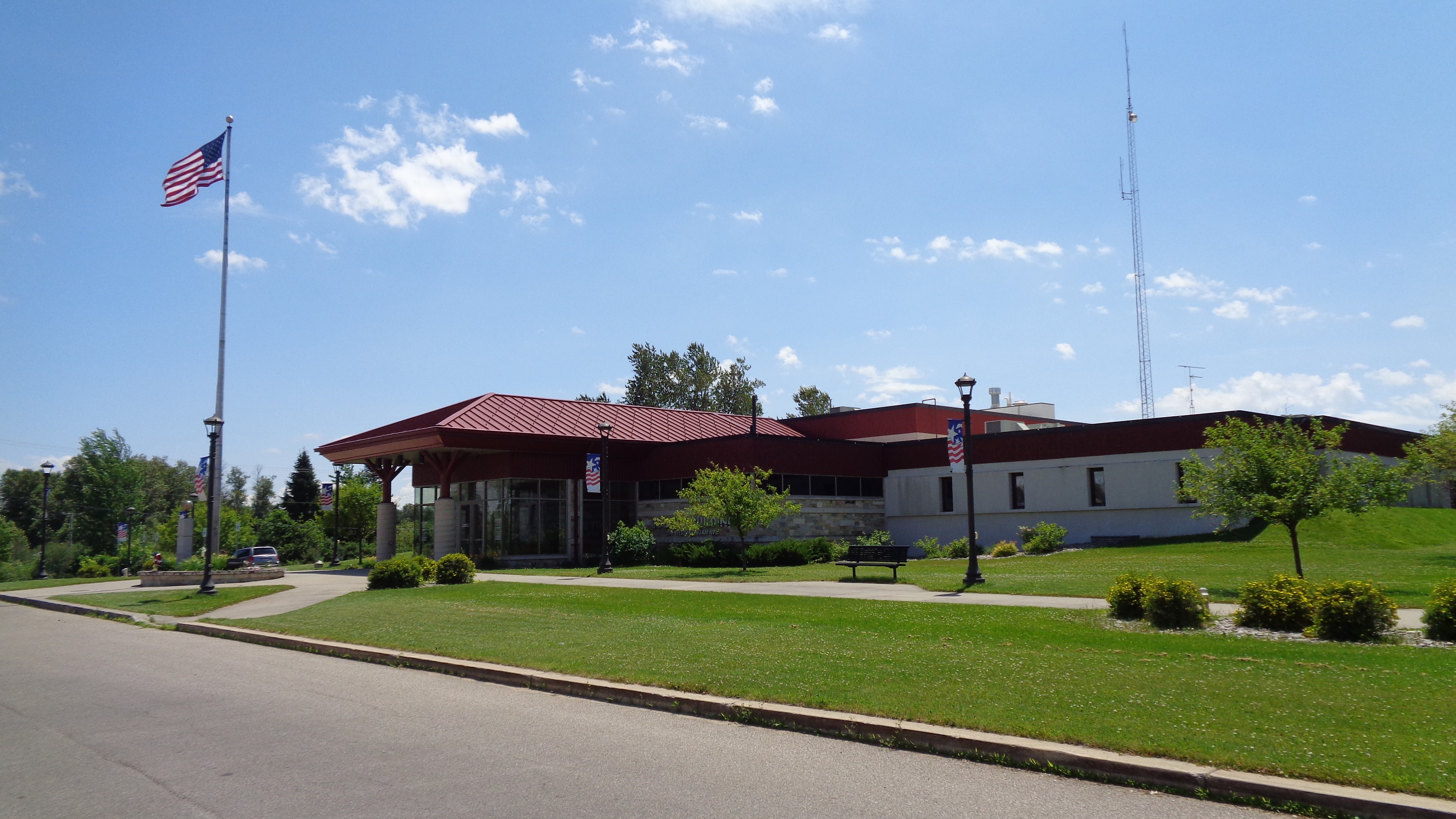
- Crawford County Building in Grayling

- Location within the U.S. state of Michigan
- Coordinates: 44°41′N 84°37′W
- Country: United States
- State: Michigan
- Founded: 1840
- Named for: William Crawford
- Seat: Grayling
- Largest city: Grayling

Area
  - Total: 563 sq mi (1,460 km^{2})
  - Land: 556 sq mi (1,440 km^{2})
  - Water: 7.0 sq mi (18 km^{2}) 1.2%

Population (2020)
  - Total: 12,988
  - Estimate (2025): 13,722 ▲
  - Density: 23.4/sq mi (9.02/km^{2})
- Time zone: UTC−5 (Eastern)
  - Summer (DST): UTC−4 (EDT)
- Congressional district: 1st
- Website: www.crawfordco.org

Crawford County is a county in the U.S. state of Michigan. Its population was 12,988 as of the 2020 census. The county seat of Crawford County is Grayling, the county's only incorporated community.

Crawford County is located in the Northern Lower Peninsula of Michigan. It contains land within three of Michigan's largest watersheds, belonging to the Au Sable, Manistee, and Muskegon rivers and 75% of the county is publicly owned by the Department of Military Affairs, the United States Forest Service or the State of Michigan.

== History ==
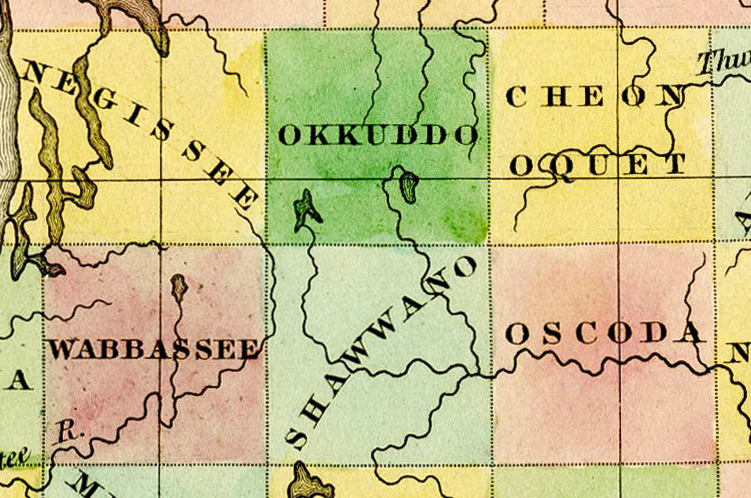
A detail from A New Map of Michigan with its Canals, Roads & Distances (1842) by Henry Schenck Tanner, showing Crawford County as "Shawwano" (a misspelling of Shawono, the county's name from 1840 to 1843.) Several nearby counties are also shown with names that would later be changed.

The county is named for Col. William Crawford, a Revolutionary War officer captured by Native Americans near Sandusky, Ohio and burned at the stake in 1792. Created by the Michigan Legislature as Shawono County in 1840, before being renamed in 1843 as Crawford County. "Shawono" was derived from an Ojibwe word, zhaawanong, meaning "from the south". The area was administered by other Michigan counties before 1879 when the county government was organized.

Due to the location in rural northern Michigan, Crawford County's greatest economic growth occurred in the 1800s when lumbering clear-cut most of the extensive forests of Norway pine, birch, maple, beech and hemlock. With the trees gone, tourism became the center of the economy. In the 1870s Crawford County became a popular destination for recreational fishing. The Michigan grayling, found in the Au Sable River, first gained the attention of anglers. The Crawford County Avalanche began publishing a weekly paper in 1879. Their first edition featured a fishing story on the front-page. By the end of the century, the grayling species vanished due to a combination of overfishing, river degradation due to logging, and the impact of human-introduced brown trout. The Au Sable River of today boasts large populations of brown and rainbow trout and remains a premiere trout fishing area in both Michigan and the nation.

=== 1900s ===
A 1912 text, A History of Northern Michigan and its people by Perry F. Powers & Harry Gordner Cutler describes Crawford County: The topography is rolling hills but not so steep as to impede farm equipment. The Au Sable River, along with its tributaries, traverse the entire county, providing water and locations for ranching livestock. It also presents an opportunity for superb trout fishing. On the western county line is a natural reservoir that forms the Manistee River. Transportation is primarily provided by the Michigan Central railroad. The Detroit & Charlevoix railroad has track to Frederic, Michigan to the northwest. Half of the land is the county is a gravel loam soil which can produce standard crops. Thousands of acres of clear-cut old growth pine in Crawford County is available to settle. Potatoes, clover and root crops will thrive in this soil. Growing clover seed has become recognized as a “money crop”. Fruit trees are becoming a popular choice with apples being prolific and flavorful. “Plains” soil supports native grasses which stockmen are using for profitable sheep and cattle ranches throughout the county. There are few swamps and lowlands, all along narrow strips beside waterways, which can be productive with proper drainage. Over a hundred years ago, people journeyed "up north" for rest, recreation and their health. Hunting has always been popular, and for wild game, large tracts of second-growth timber on land originally clear-cut provide better food and protection than the original forests did. Deer populations are stable despite the hundreds that are taken every year by settlers and sportsmen.

=== Winter Sports Park ===
The Grayling Winter Sports Park (GWSP) was opened in 1929. It started as a toboggan run that grew into Michigan's first ski resort. Following the popular 1932 Winter Olympics, Grayling constructed a 66-foot ski jump in 1934. A few years later, a Winter Carnival was started that included a parade, ice sculpture competition, and a Snow Queen pageant. The park's popularity increased to the point where a "Snow Train" was established to bring skiers to Grayling from across the state. Transportation from Lodges in Grayling to the park was provided by flat-bed trucks. Groomed trails were provided for Cross-country skiing and snowshoeing.

The Cass City Chronicle noted in March 1941, "Due to generous support of the federal park service, state conservation department, and Civilian Conservation Corps, Grayling offers today the finest public toboggan set-up in the entire United States, and this isn't paid ballyhoo. Six steel slides are the only ones of their kind anywhere not excluding Lake Placid or Sun Valley (Idaho). Two ski tows have been in operation; next season there will be three."

The Crawford County operated the GWSP into the late 1960s when Fred Bear, owner of Bear Archery, and other local businessmen assumed operational control. It was renamed, Bear Mountain and they attempted to create a commercial ski area to compete with resorts further north. A legal challenge in 1973 resulted in a judgement giving control back to the county, which has operated it since then as Hanson Hills Recreation Area by the Grayling Recreation Authority.

The annual canoe / kayak race record winning time is held by Scott Norman in his significantly modified kayak, which not only gave him the speed record, but also the distance record, as his brakes failed to deploy and he was retrieved by snowmobile outside of the park near M-93. "

=== Military ===
In 1913, lumber baron Rasmus Hanson donated 147,000 acres (590 km2) of harvested timberland to the state of Michigan for military training. Most of the land is situated in Crawford County, with parcels in Kalkaska and Otsego counties. Troops first began training there in 1914. It is the primary training facility for the Michigan National Guard and is the largest National Guard training facility in the United States.

=== Hartwick Pines ===
Edward Hartwick graduated from Grayling High School in 1888 and received an appointment to West Point in 1889. Four years later he graduated with high honors and was assigned to the 4th Cavalry. He soon transferred to the 9th Cavalry, known as the Buffalo Soldiers on the western frontier. With the advent of the Spanish–American War, his unit was sent to Cuba where he participated in the Battle of San Juan Hill. At wars end, he returned to Grayling and married Karen Bessie Michelson, then resigned his commission nine months later. He engaged in the banking and lumber business, prospered, and later moved to Detroit. When the United States entered World War I, he volunteered for service at age 46 and was commissioned an Army Major. After just a few months in France, he contracted meningitis and died. In 1927, Karen Michelson Hartwick purchased 8,000 acres (3,200 ha) including the last 85 acres (34 ha) of virgin old growth pine forest in Michigan's lower peninsula and donated it to the state of Michigan to honor her husband. Hartwick Pines State Park is the largest state park in the lower peninsula.

=== Fire ===
The Stephen Bridge Road Fire of 1990 was a significant event in Northern Michigan and was reported in the national news.
On a snowy day in March 1990, a homeowner was preparing to burn large brush piles from a section of land he recently cleared. He obtained a burn permit before setting the fire and monitoring it. The large piles smoked and smoldered for a couple of weeks before the fire seemed to burn out. One month later, the fire rekindled, burned for a day, then appeared to go out again. Three weeks passed, and a property owner nearby noticed the pile burning, and less than 20 minutes later had spread to the neighboring woodland.
An investigation determined that the fire had been continuously burning at the base of the pile from the middle of March until May 8. On that day, a strong wind brought fresh air and the fire took off. Crews contained the fire in less than two days. But, by the time it was all said and done – almost seven weeks after the first flame was sparked 5,916 acres along 8 miles had burned, $5.5 million in property including 76 homes, 125 other buildings, 37 vehicles & boats and $700,000 in timber had been destroyed.

The National Fire Protection Association (NFPA) produced a case study in 1991 titled, "1990 Stephan Bridge Road Fire, northern Lower Michigan".

== Geography ==
According to the U.S. Census Bureau, the county has a total area of 563 square miles (1,460 km^{2}), of which 556 square miles (1,440 km^{2}) is land and 7.0 square miles (18 km^{2}) (1.2%) is water. Although it is located on Michigan's Lower Peninsula, Crawford County is considered to be part of Northern Michigan. The county contains land within three of Michigan's largest watersheds, belonging to the Au Sable, Manistee, and Muskegon rivers.

Crawford County has relatively few lakes, mostly in the northern part of the county. Lake Margrethe is the county's largest and has a surface area of 1,920 acres (7.8 km^{2}). Other water bodies >100 acres include Big Bradford Lake, Big Bear Lake, KP Lake, Shellenbarger Lake, Shupac Lake and Wakeley Lake. Some of these are so-called kettle lakes,' formed by the melting of blocks of glacial ice, left as the glacier retreated, which created a depression in the soil. The Manistee River flows on the western edge of the county; branches of the Au Sable River flow throughout the remainder of the county.

The county is part of the Au Sable State Forest, specifically the Grayling FMU (Alcona, Crawford, Oscoda, and northern Iosco counties). Parts of the county are also within the Huron National Forest. Glaciers shaped the area, creating a unique regional ecosystem. A large portion of the area is the so-called Grayling outwash plain, which consists of broad outwash plain including sandy ice-disintegration ridges; jack pine barrens, some white pine-red pine forest, and northern hardwood forest. Large lakes were created by glacial action.

=== Rivers ===
- Au Sable River, begins in Otsego County, Michigan and flows through Crawford, Oscoda, Alcona, then Iosco before flowing into Lake Huron.
- Manistee River begins in Antrim County, Michigan and flows through Otsego, Crawford, Kalkaska, Wexford, then Manistee before flowing into Lake Michigan.

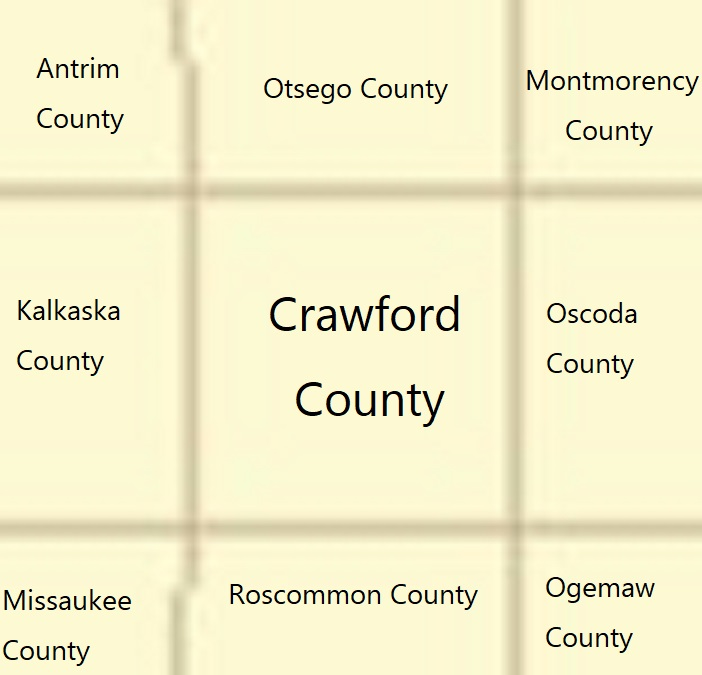
Neighboring counties

=== Adjacent counties ===
- Otsego County - north
- Montmorency County - northeast
- Oscoda County - east
- Ogemaw County - southeast
- Roscommon County - south
- Missaukee County - southwest
- Kalkaska County - west
- Antrim County - northwest

=== Protected areas ===
- Huron National Forest (part)
- Au Sable State Forest
- Huron–Manistee National Forests
- Kirtlands Warbler Wildlife Management Area

=== State Parks ===
- Hartwick Pines State Park
- North Higgins Lake State Park

== Communities ==
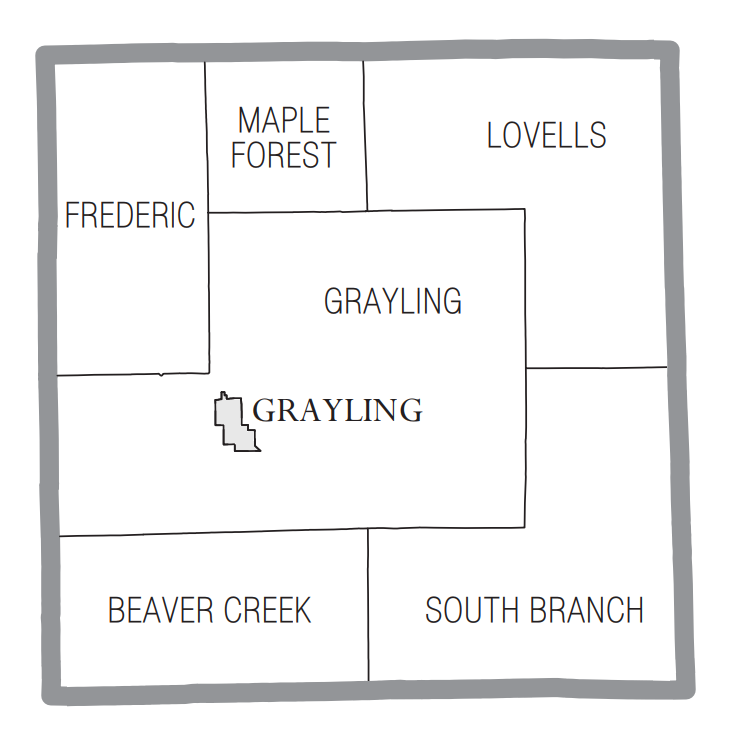
U.S. Census data map showing local municipal boundaries within Crawford County. Shaded areas represent incorporated cities.

=== City ===
- Grayling

=== Charter township ===
- Grayling Charter Township

=== Civil townships ===
- Beaver Creek Township
- Frederic Township
- Lovells Township
- Maple Forest Township
- South Branch Township

=== Unincorporated communities ===
- Babbits Resort
- Collens Landing
- Danish Landing
- Deerheart Valley
- Eldorado
- Five Corners
- Forbush Corner
- Frederic
- Ishaward
- Lake Margrethe
- Louis Cabin Landing
- Lovells
- McIntyre Landing
- Rasmus
- Skyline Village
- Wildwood

=== Ghost towns ===
- Bucks
- Deward
- Pere Cheney

== Demographics ==
Historical population
Census	Pop.	Note	%±
1880	1,159		—
1890	2,962		155.6%
1900	2,943		−0.6%
1910	3,934		33.7%
1920	4,049		2.9%
1930	3,097		−23.5%
1940	3,765		21.6%
1950	4,151		10.3%
1960	4,971		19.8%
1970	6,482		30.4%
1980	9,465		46.0%
1990	12,260		29.5%
2000	14,273		16.4%
2010	14,074		−1.4%
2020	12,988		−7.7%
2025 (est.)	13,722	▲	5.7%
U.S. Decennial Census; 1790-1960 1900-1990; 1990-2000 2010-2018

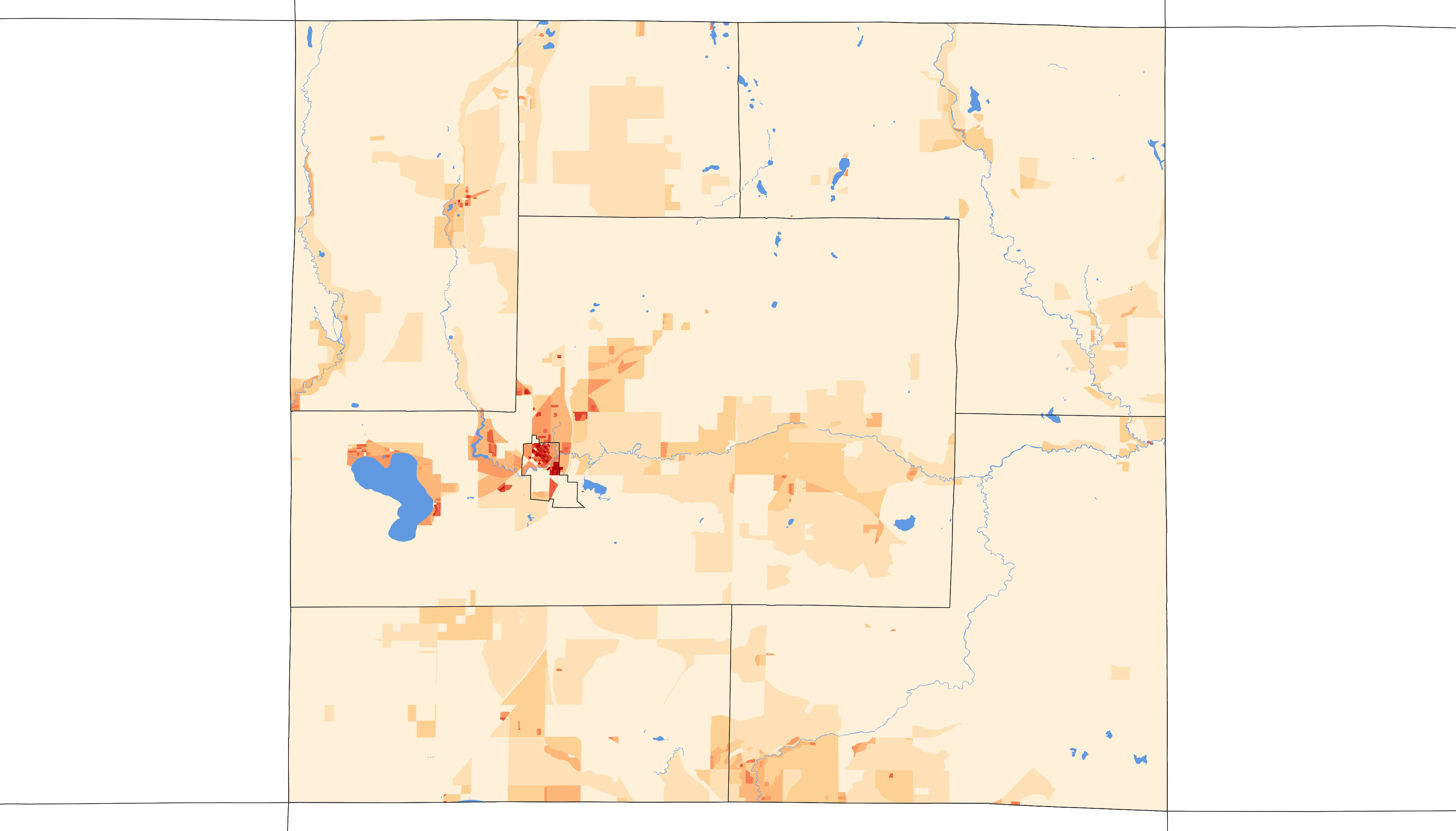
Population density of Crawford County MI by 2020 census block

=== Racial and ethnic composition ===
Crawford County, Michigan – Racial and ethnic composition Note: the US Census treats Hispanic/Latino as an ethnic category. This table excludes Latinos from the racial categories and assigns them to a separate category. Hispanics/Latinos may be of any race.
Race / Ethnicity (NH = Non-Hispanic)	Pop 1980	Pop 1990	Pop 2000	Pop 2010	Pop 2020	% 1980	% 1990	% 2000	% 2010	% 2020
White alone (NH)	9,295	11,737	13,660	13,586	12,026	98.20%	95.73%	95.71%	96.53%	92.59%
Black or African American alone (NH)	56	260	213	42	57	0.59%	2.12%	1.49%	0.30%	0.44%
Native American or Alaska Native alone (NH)	44	142	85	71	83	0.46%	1.16%	0.60%	0.50%	0.64%
Asian alone (NH)	16	42	36	52	55	0.17%	0.34%	0.25%	0.37%	0.42%
Native Hawaiian or Pacific Islander alone (NH)	x	x	1	1	4	x	x	0.01%	0.01%	0.03%
Other race alone (NH)	5	0	2	2	29	0.05%	0.00%	0.01%	0.01%	0.22%
Mixed race or Multiracial (NH)	x	x	134	138	442	x	x	0.94%	0.98%	3.40%
Hispanic or Latino (any race)	49	79	142	182	292	0.52%	0.64%	0.99%	1.29%	2.25%
Total	9,465	12,260	14,273	14,074	12,988	100.00%	100.00%	100.00%	100.00%	100.00%

=== 2020 census ===
As of the 2020 census, the county had a population of 12,988. The median age was 51.0 years, 18.0% of residents were under the age of 18, and 26.2% were 65 years of age or older. For every 100 females there were 105.5 males, and for every 100 females age 18 and over there were 103.5 males age 18 and over.

The racial makeup of the county was 93.5% White, 0.4% Black or African American, 0.7% American Indian and Alaska Native, 0.4% Asian, <0.1% Native Hawaiian and Pacific Islander, 0.5% from some other race, and 4.4% from two or more races. Hispanic or Latino residents of any race comprised 2.2% of the population.

0.2% of residents lived in urban areas, while 99.8% lived in rural areas.

There were 5,663 households in the county, of which 21.6% had children under the age of 18 living in them. Of all households, 48.9% were married-couple households, 22.1% were households with a male householder and no spouse or partner present, and 22.0% were households with a female householder and no spouse or partner present. About 30.8% of all households were made up of individuals and 15.4% had someone living alone who was 65 years of age or older.

There were 10,174 housing units, of which 44.3% were vacant. Among occupied housing units, 82.4% were owner-occupied and 17.6% were renter-occupied. The homeowner vacancy rate was 1.9% and the rental vacancy rate was 12.0%.

=== 2000 census ===
As of the 2000 census, there were 14,273 people, 5,625 households, and 4,038 families residing in the county. The population density was 26 people per square mile (10 people/km^{2}). There were 10,042 housing units at an average density of 18 per square mile (6.9/km^{2}).

In 2000, the racial makeup of the county was 96.38% White, 1.50% Black or African American, 0.60% Native American, 0.25% Asian, 0.02% Pacific Islander, 0.20% from other races, and 1.05% from two or more races. 0.99% of the population were Hispanic or Latino of any race. 24.8% were of German, 12.5% English, 10.1% American, 8.9% Irish, 7.4% Polish and 5.9% French ancestry. 97.7% spoke English and 1.5% Spanish as their first language.

There were 5,625 households, out of which 30.00% had children under the age of 18 living with them, 57.60% were married couples living together, 9.70% had a female householder with no husband present, and 28.20% were non-families. 24.00% of all households were made up of individuals, and 10.50% had someone living alone who was 65 years of age or older. The average household size was 2.45 and the average family size was 2.87.

In the county, 24.50% of the population was under the age of 18, 6.30% was from 18 to 24, 26.60% from 25 to 44, 26.00% from 45 to 64, and 16.60% was 65 years of age or older. The median age was 41 years. For every 100 females there were 104.00 males. For every 100 females age 18 and over, there were 100.40 males.

In 2000, the median income for a household in the county was $33,364, and the median income for a family was $37,056. Males had a median income of $31,504 versus $21,250 for females. The per capita income for the county was $16,903. About 10.00% of families and 12.70% of the population were below the poverty line, including 17.60% of those under age 18 and 7.60% of those age 65 or over.

=== Religion ===
Crawford County is part of the Roman Catholic Diocese of Gaylord. It is also located in the Episcopal Diocese of Eastern Michigan, based in Saginaw, Michigan.

== Economy ==
The largest employer in the county is Camp Grayling followed by the Grayling Hospital. The small size of the population won't support any big box stores; Tractor Supply Company moved into the building that Kmart vacated in the late 2010s. There have been a few small employers added to the industrial park at West Four Mile Road south of Grayling. Several microbreweries and a new art gallery opened prior to the COVID-19 pandemic, and summer tourist spending is rising again.

=== Banking ===
Crawford County has branches of two large commercial banks, Fifth Third Bank and Huntington Bank; two area banks, Horizon Bank (from Indiana) and State Savings Bank (from Gaylord); and two Michigan credit unions, Northland Area Federal Credit Union and North Central Area Credit Union.

=== Logistics ===
Several trucking companies have operations in Crawford County.

=== Media ===
The Crawford County Avalanche states that it has been "Grayling's Hometown Newspaper Since 1879".

=== Military ===
Camp Grayling is the primary training facility for the Michigan National Guard and is the largest National Guard training facility in the United States.

== Government ==
United States presidential election results for Crawford County, Michigan
Year	Republican		Democratic		Third party(ies)	
Year	No.	%	No.	%	No.	%
1884	304	56.72%	223	41.60%	9	1.68%
1888	436	47.14%	479	51.78%	10	1.08%
1892	300	48.62%	306	49.59%	11	1.78%
1896	350	49.65%	350	49.65%	5	0.71%
1900	440	62.59%	252	35.85%	11	1.56%
1904	587	73.56%	190	23.81%	21	2.63%
1908	590	67.82%	237	27.24%	43	4.94%
1912	257	34.97%	185	25.17%	293	39.86%
1916	409	46.21%	450	50.85%	26	2.94%
1920	726	64.42%	361	32.03%	40	3.55%
1924	840	72.92%	163	14.15%	149	12.93%
1928	776	76.30%	237	23.30%	4	0.39%
1932	559	41.81%	755	56.47%	23	1.72%
1936	580	38.85%	876	58.67%	37	2.48%
1940	873	52.53%	777	46.75%	12	0.72%
1944	797	58.82%	550	40.59%	8	0.59%
1948	849	63.93%	455	34.26%	24	1.81%
1952	1,331	72.53%	490	26.70%	14	0.76%
1956	1,380	71.50%	547	28.34%	3	0.16%
1960	1,464	65.04%	783	34.78%	4	0.18%
1964	696	32.22%	1,464	67.78%	0	0.00%
1968	1,266	55.04%	845	36.74%	189	8.22%
1972	1,953	61.98%	1,143	36.27%	55	1.75%
1976	2,359	54.82%	1,889	43.90%	55	1.28%
1980	2,652	53.42%	1,826	36.78%	486	9.79%
1984	3,303	67.46%	1,558	31.82%	35	0.71%
1988	3,097	62.28%	1,825	36.70%	51	1.03%
1992	2,193	37.01%	2,252	38.01%	1,480	24.98%
1996	2,157	37.70%	2,666	46.60%	898	15.70%
2000	3,345	52.56%	2,790	43.84%	229	3.60%
2004	4,017	55.52%	3,126	43.21%	92	1.27%
2008	3,561	49.61%	3,441	47.94%	176	2.45%
2012	3,744	54.95%	2,994	43.94%	76	1.12%
2016	4,354	63.62%	2,110	30.83%	380	5.55%
2020	5,087	64.71%	2,672	33.99%	102	1.30%
2024	5,613	66.22%	2,752	32.47%	111	1.31%

United States Senate election results for Crawford County, Michigan1
Year	Republican		Democratic		Third party(ies)	
Year	No.	%	No.	%	No.	%
2024	5,360	64.34%	2,696	32.36%	275	3.30%

Michigan Gubernatorial election results for Crawford County
Year	Republican		Democratic		Third party(ies)	
Year	No.	%	No.	%	No.	%
2022	3,728	57.08%	2,655	40.65%	148	2.27%

=== Administrative structure ===
Governmental responsibilities within Michigan counties are divided between cities and townships, with the county providing certain services that are economically justified.

=== County Commissioners ===
General financial control in Crawford County is vested in a 7-member elected County commission. In Michigan, they have limited authority to make laws or ordinances. Most local government functions are the responsibility of individual cities and townships. The county commission delegates authority to an appointed Controller who functions as the County executive, following the direction of the commission in daily operations and management. The controller in Crawford County is Paul Compo.

District	Commissioner	Term ends
1	Laurie Jamison – Chair	2026
2	Dorothy A Frederic	2026
3	Shelly Pinkelman	2026
4	Jamie McClain	2026
5	Carey S. Jansen	2026
6	Sherry M. Powers	2026
7	Phil Lewis – Vice-chair	2026

=== Law enforcement ===
The Crawford County Sheriff is elected to lead the county's law enforcement department. The sheriff's jurisdiction encompasses all areas where a city or township has not established another Law enforcement agency. The county seat has the Grayling Police Department. The current sheriff is Ryan Swope. The Sheriff is also responsible for the Crawford County Dispatch Center which responds to 911 calls as well as non-emergencies 24 hours a day. They forward calls for fires and medical emergencies throughout the county. The county jail is also staffed and managed by the Sheriff's Department, as is security for the county courts.

=== Fire & rescue ===
Firefighting and Emergency services are the responsibility of cities and townships. The City of Grayling and Grayling Charter township have a joint department, with 22 salaried and paid-per call professionals. The remaining townships each have a primarily Volunteer fire department, but all provide mutual and automatic aid to other departments throughout the county and adjacent counties. They also participate in Wildfire suppression due to large forested areas including state parks, National Forests, state forests and wildlife management areas.

=== Road department ===
The Crawford County Road Department (CCRD) has responsibility for 180 miles of primary roads, 206 miles of state highways and 526 miles of local roads in the county. The counties 34 CCRD employees and utilize hundreds of pieces of equipment to keep county roadways in good repair. The department is also responsible for traffic signals, flashing beacons, bridges, road signs and culverts within county road rights of way throughout Crawford County's 558 square miles. Normal duties include: roadside brush control, snow and ice removal, roadside mowing, dust control on gravel roads, patching potholes, pavement markings, road & bridge design, inspection of contracted projects, and traffic studies. Five elected road commissioners meet bi-weekly to review, approve and plan department activities.

Road Commissioners	Term ends
Ryan Halstead – Chairman	2030
Gary Summers – Vice Chairman	2028
Scott Hanson	2028
Cris Jones	2026
Ronald J. Larson	2026

=== Records ===
The County Clerk is responsible for maintaining vital records including divorce/marriage, death/birth, notary, DBA registration, application to carry a concealed pistol, DD214. The officeholder is also Register of Deeds legally recording real/personal property docs, indexes and provides access to mortgages and liens, deeds, UCC transactions, oil/gas/mineral rights. Legal Records involve filing civil cases valued above $25,000 for Circuit Trial Court and processing criminal felony cases transferred from District Court. Unemployment (MESC), Probate Court and driver's license restoration appeals are also filed as well as orders of personal protection. Change of venue, civil/criminal bond money collection, construction lien certificate releases and issuing vendor permits to veterans are also normal processes. The County Clerk position is elected and the current officeholder in Crawford County is Sandra M. Moore.

=== Treasurer ===
In other states, the County Treasurer is known as the Tax Collector. Disbursements from the county, including payroll and vendor payments, are made by the treasurer following authorization by the County Commissioners. The treasurer must also maximize the interest earned on undisbursed funds through safe, short-term investments. The treasurer documents the collection of funds to the county which include: property taxes, state and federal grants, interest income, and various service and license fees. The County Clerk collects money in the course of daily business including fines, fees and bonds, then forwards it to the treasurer. The position of treasurer is elected and the current officeholder in Crawford County is Kate M. Wagner.

=== Legal ===
Crawford County's chief law enforcement official is the Prosecuting Attorney/County Counsel. They have a multitude of responsibilities that include:

- Prosecution of felony and misdemeanor violations of the criminal laws of Michigan
- Prosecution of violations of County ordinances
- Prosecution of juvenile offenses, both felony & misdemeanor
- Represent the County in Circuit and District Courts; parental neglect and juvenile delinquency; Family Court probate issues; the Court of Appeals; the Supreme Court of Michigan
- Attend commitment hearings for mental health if contested
- Establish paternity and family support orders
- Represent County departments and the County Commission on legal issues

The position of prosecutor is elected and the current officeholder in Crawford County is Sierra R. Koch.

=== Judicial ===
There are three courts in Crawford County: Crawford County Probate Court, 46th Circuit Court, and 87-C District Court. The Michigan Supreme Court approved a Concurrent Jurisdiction Plan, an agreement entered into by all Crawford County elected judges. The judicial in the county operates as a unified (single) trial court, resulting in an efficient use of resources. This system reduces repetition, simplifies case processing, provides better customer service, controls costs and reduces receivables. One appointed court administrator assists all the judges with any administrative matter in the court system.

Court	Official
46th Circuit	Judge George Mertz
46th Circuit	Judge Colin G. Hunter
87-C District	Judge Monte J. Burmeister
County	Magistrate Angie Cragg

=== State/National ===
Office	District	Officeholder	Political party
U.S. Representative	1st	Jack Bergman	Republican
State Senator	36th	Michele Hoitenga	Republican
State Representative	105th	Ken Borton	Republican

(information as of July 2023)

== Education ==
=== Primary and secondary ===
Due to their small population, the county can only sustain one high school, middle school and elementary school. The Crawford AuSable School Board is elected to establish policy to provide the best programs to meet the needs of the students while being fiscally responsible and hiring a superintendent to execute those policies. The current superintendent is Tim Sanchez.

Board Member	Role	Term ends
Matt Cragg	Secretary	2028
Wendy Kucharek	Trustee	2030
Pam LaGattuta	Trustee	2030
Josh Peters	Treasurer	2026
Nicole Persing-Wethington	President	2028
Lori Johnson	Vice President	2030
Ryan Finstrom	Trustee	2026

- Crawford AuSable School District serves 1,619 students in Crawford County.
- Grayling Adventist Elementary School serves 9 students.

=== Post-secondary ===
Crawford County is home to Kirtland Community College, a public community college in Grayling.

=== Public library ===
The Deveraux Memorial Library in Grayling is the public library in Crawford County.

== Infrastructure ==
=== Transportation ===
Due to its size, the county has no scheduled bus service and limited taxi service. The Crawford County Transportation Authority offers dial-a-ride service at low rates.

==== Air service ====
Crawford County is not served by commercial airlines. Grayling Army Airfield, (ICAO: KGOV, FAA LID: GOV) is a public/military use airport located one nautical mile (1.85 km) northwest of the central business district of Grayling. Built in 1977, the United States Army owns it, and a fixed-base operator provides support services to general aviation users.

==== Bus service ====
- Indian Trails provides daily intercity bus service in Grayling between St. Ignace and East Lansing, Michigan.

==== Major highways ====
- I-75 from Detroit in the south enters on the west side of Crawford County, passes to the east of Grayling, and connects with the Mackinac Bridge to the north.
- BL I-75 is a business loop route running through Grayling. It follows the former route of US 27, in part.
- US 127 in Lansing goes north through Clare into Roscommon County where it enters Crawford County and terminates at I-75 in Beaver Creek township south of Grayling.
- M-18 begins on M-72 in South Branch Township near the Oscoda County line and runs south before curving to the west in a loop to Roscommon.
- M-72 is one of only three roads that stretch east–west from Lake Huron to Lake Michigan. It enters South Branch Township from Oscoda County in the southeast, passes through Grayling and continues northeast through Frederic Township to Traverse City.
- M-93 is an 11-mile (18 km) route connecting the main gate of Michigan Army National Guard's Camp Grayling, 4 miles (6.4 km) southwest of Grayling, with Hartwick Pines State Park, 7 miles (11 km) northeast of Grayling.
- F-32 begins at BL I-75/M-93 on the northern edge of Grayling and continues east toward Mio.
- F-97 is a north–south route that begins at Gladwin and goes north through Prudenville, St. Helen, follows M-18 in Crawford County, then continues into southern Otsego County.
- County Highway 612 is an east–west roadway that starts southwest of Manistee Lake in Manistee county and continues east through Frederic in northern Crawford County, has an interchange at I-75, passes through Lewiston and ends at M-33 in Montmorency county.

==== Bicycle route ====
- There are bicycle lanes identified on some roadways.
- Grayling Bicycle Turnpike begins at Hartwick Pines State Park and parallels M-93 for 6.5 miles, ending at Michigan Avenue in Grayling.

=== Utilities ===
The City of Grayling provides municipal water and sewer to residents, and Beaver Creek/GraylingTownship Utility Authority provides municipal water and sewer to residents on the Four Mile Road corridor. All other county residents utilize well water and private septic systems approved by the Crawford County Health Department.

Electrical service throughout the county is provided by either Consumers Energy or Great Lakes Energy Co-op. Natural gas is provided by DTE Energy. Propane Service is provided by half a dozen providers.

=== Health ===
- Senior Citizen assistance is provided by Crawford County Commission on Aging, who also sponsor a Senior Center and numerous programs and services to the elderly.
- The Crawford County Health Department also offers services to seniors and low income residents.
- The primary provider of healthcare in Crawford County is Munson Healthcare with the Grayling Community Health Center and Grayling Hospital.

== See also ==
- List of counties in Michigan
- List of Michigan State Historic Sites in Crawford County, Michigan
- National Register of Historic Places listings in Crawford County, Michigan
