= Roscommon Zoo =

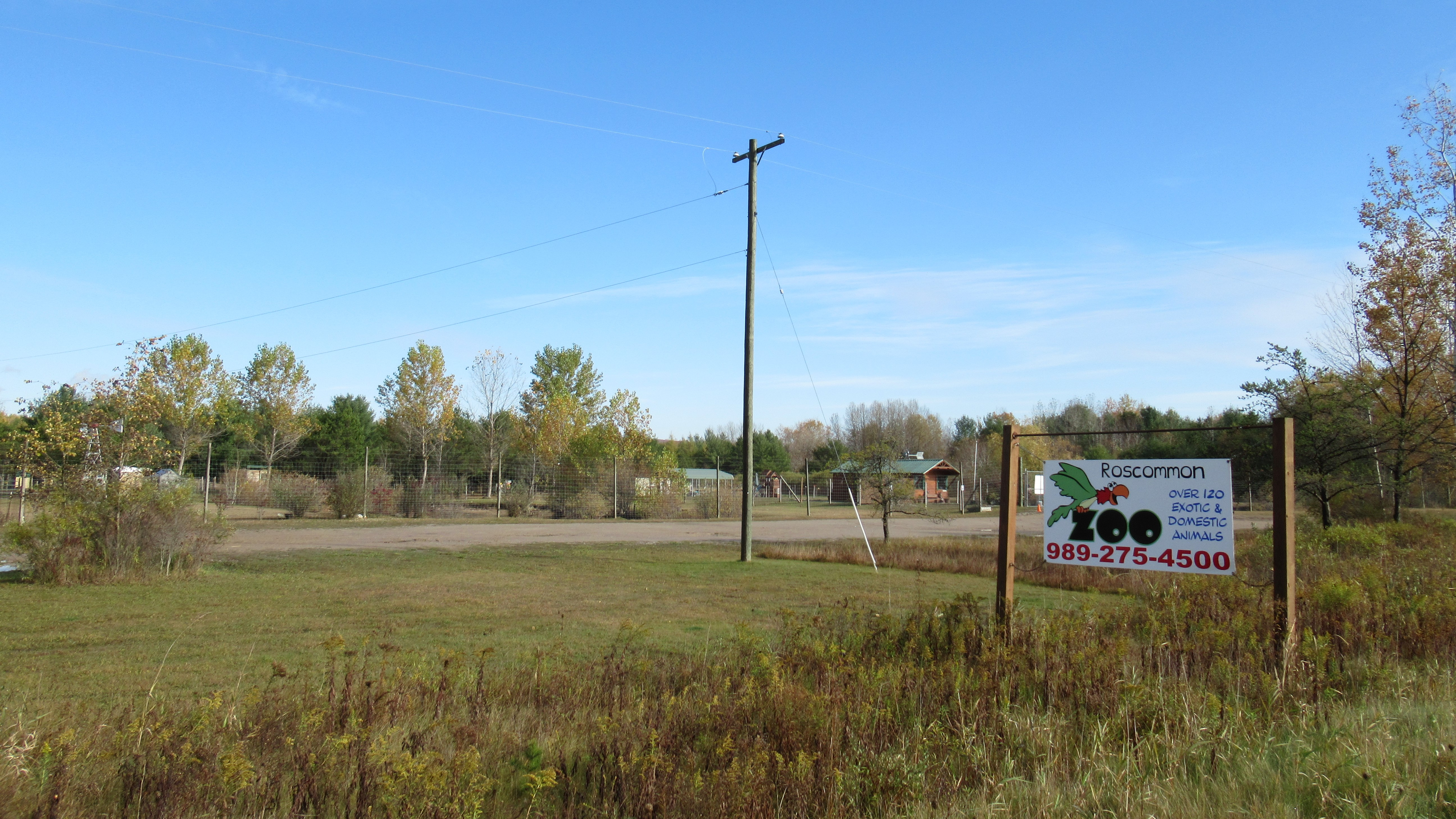
- View from the roadside along M-18
- Interactive map of Roscommon Zoo
- 44°30′40″N 84°29′05″W
- Location: 6327 M-18; Roscommon, Michigan 48653
- Land area: 20 acres (8.1 ha)
- No. of animals: 120
- Website: Official website

The Roscommon Zoo is a rural zoo located within South Branch Township in the U.S. state of Michigan. The zoo is located along M-18 just east of the village of Roscommon.

It occupies 20 acres (8.1 ha) and has more than 120 domestic and exotic animals. The zoo is family owned and operated and also has a petting zoo.
