= Pere Cheney, Michigan =

- Ghost town and former village
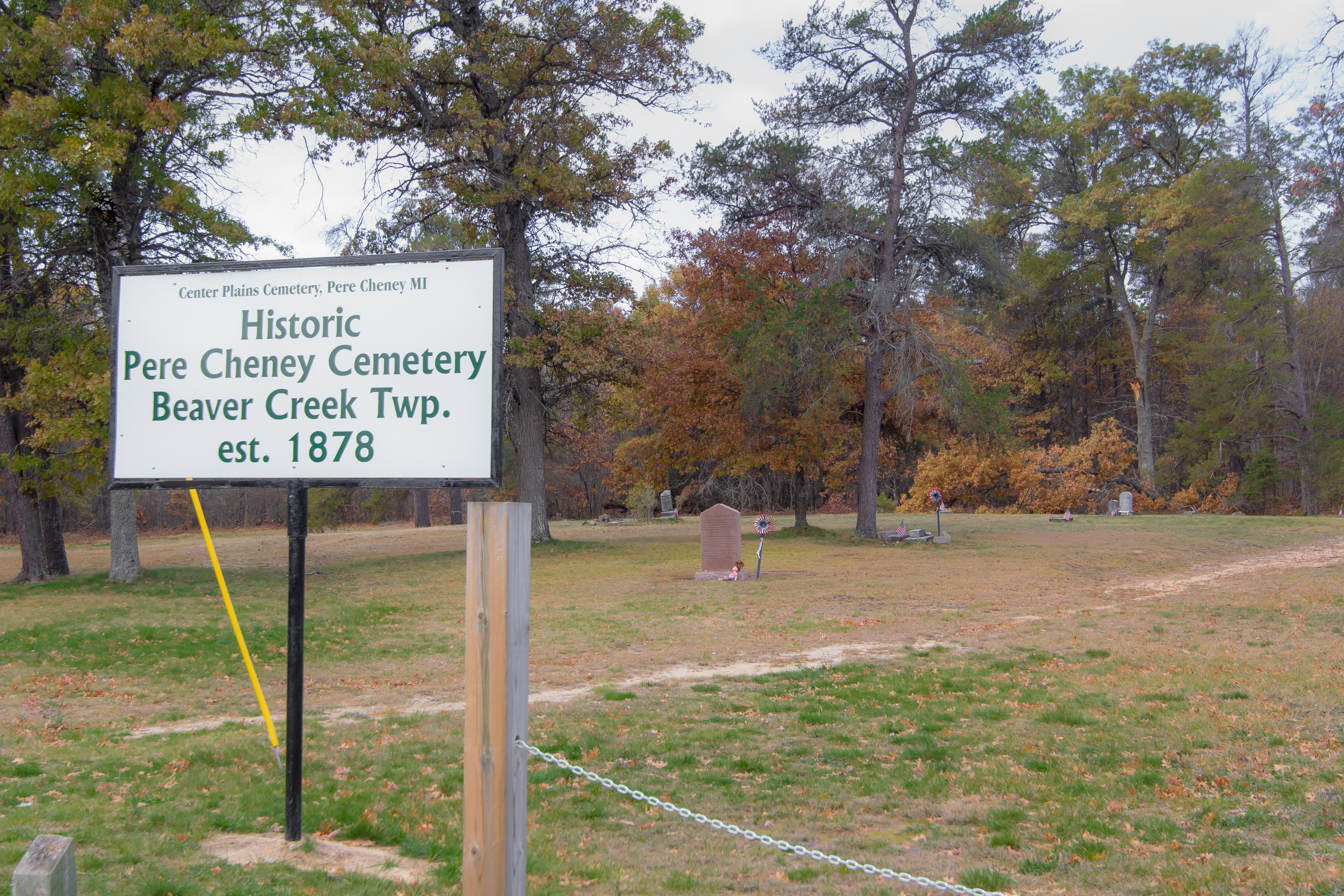
- Historic Pere Cheney Cemetery

- Location in the state of Michigan Location within the United States
- Coordinates: 44°34′39″N 84°38′16″W
- Country: United States
- State: Michigan
- County: Crawford
- Township: Beaver Creek
- Elevation: 1,201 ft (366 m)
- Time zone: UTC-5 (Eastern (EST))
  - Summer (DST): UTC-4 (EDT)
- ZIP code(s): 48653 (Roscommon)
- Area code: 989
- GNIS feature ID: 1617781

Pere Cheney, also called Cheney and Center Plains, was a village located in Crawford County, Michigan in the late 19th century. It is located in Beaver Creek Township and was once a small lumbering town. Pere Cheney was the first community in Crawford County, Michigan and was established by lumberjacks who trailed the Jackson, Lansing and Saginaw Railroad north headed for Mackinaw City. Established in 1874 around the sawmill of George M. Cheney, it served as the temporary county seat when Crawford County was officially organized in 1879, though it soon lost this distinction to the more heavily populated town of Grayling. It had a station on the Michigan Central Railroad called the Cheney depot, and a post office. The post office closed in 1912, and the village was abandoned in the early Twentieth century. It has since taken on the reputation of a ghost town.

== History ==
Pere Cheney was established in 1873, as founder George Cheney received a land grant from the Michigan Central Railroad company to establish a stop along the railroad. A general store was established along with sawmills, carpenters, a doctor, hotel with a telegraph service and a post office. In the mid-1870s, the population was approximately 1,500 people. In 1893, diphtheria spread through the town, wiping out a great deal of the town's population. Diphtheria recurred in 1897, by 1901 the town's population fell to only 25 people and in 1917 there were only 18 people left in this once booming town. At that time, the land was sold off in a public auction and the town was declared a ghost town. In more recent news about Pere Cheney, on Friday, October 16, 2009, a group of teens who had gathered at the Pere Cheney Cemetery were confronted by a white male in his 50s. The man brandished and fired a shotgun at the teens. "We have had a ton of complaints over the years," said Crawford County Sheriff Kirk Wakefield, who encouraged people to stay out of the cemetery. "There's always something going in the Pere Cheney Cemetery." In March 2015, it was announced that there are plans to restore the cemetery to its former glory. To this day, Pere Cheney remains Number 2 on the Top 10 Witch Graves in the Midwest, topped only by Bloody Mary of Indiana. The cemetery is owned by Beaver Creek Township, Michigan and is maintained by the township.

== Reputation as 'ghost town' ==
There are many stories surrounding the ghost town of Pere Cheney as well as the cemetery itself. Ghosts, witches, strange figures, glowing orbs, and mysterious lights in the trees all feature. People have said to have heard children laughing while there and returning to their cars having handprints on them. Some say that Pere Cheney was a cursed town from the start as it was built on Native American land.

The cemetery is down a two track road and runs along some railroad tracks, hidden in the woods. There is no sign indicating that the cemetery exists, but during the restoration process one was put up at its gates that detail the name, brief history, and rules of conduct. A little farther north was the town of Pere Cheney, which is to be considered a Ghost Town, but nothing of the town remains excepting for scattered, rare pieces of what could have been foundations.

At least 90 people were buried in the Pere Cheney Cemetery, but, due to vandalism, very few headstones remain. Some sort of disease; cholera, or diphtheria was said to have wiped out the entire town in the early 20th century.

According to local legends, a witch cursed the village of Pere Cheney after being banished to the woods, hence the reasoning behind the mass outbreaks of disease in the area. And according to some accounts, the entire town is haunted. According to other legends, the witch was buried in the cemetery, with people indicating the red headstone that once existed there was the witches.

Most of the information about Pere Cheney states that people from nearby towns had tried to burn the town down to stop the disease from reaching them, but there is no information to support it. The disease came twice two years apart. The remaining people dragged their belongings to what we know now as Grayling. The cemetery has been vandalized and the town has a great deal of lichen amongst the natural foliage.
