= Grayling Bicycle Turnpike =

Paved trailway in Michigan, United States

Coordinates: 44.7098°N 84.70997°W

- Length: 6.5 mi (10.5 km)
- Location: Grayling, Michigan
- Trailheads: Hartwick Pines State Park, Michigan Ave.
- Use: Running, Biking, Roller skating
- Difficulty: Moderate
- Season: Year Round
- Sights: Ausable River, Interstate 75
- Hazards: Road Crossings, Highway Overpasses, Steep Grade Hills with Sweeping Curves

The Grayling Bicycle Turnpike is a multiple-use, non-motorized paved trailway in Michigan, about 6.5 miles (10.5 km) long. It begins at the entrance to Hartwick Pines State Park and runs southerly along M-93, eventually meeting Business Loop Interstate 75 (BL I-75) and ending at East Michigan Avenue.

The turnpike is used for a stretch of the Avita Water Black Bear Bicycle Tour, which coincides with the Au Sable River Canoe Marathon and shadows the route of the canoes over the roadways, beginning in Grayling and ending in Oscoda.
