= South Branch Township, Crawford County, Michigan =

South Branch Township, Michigan
- Civil township
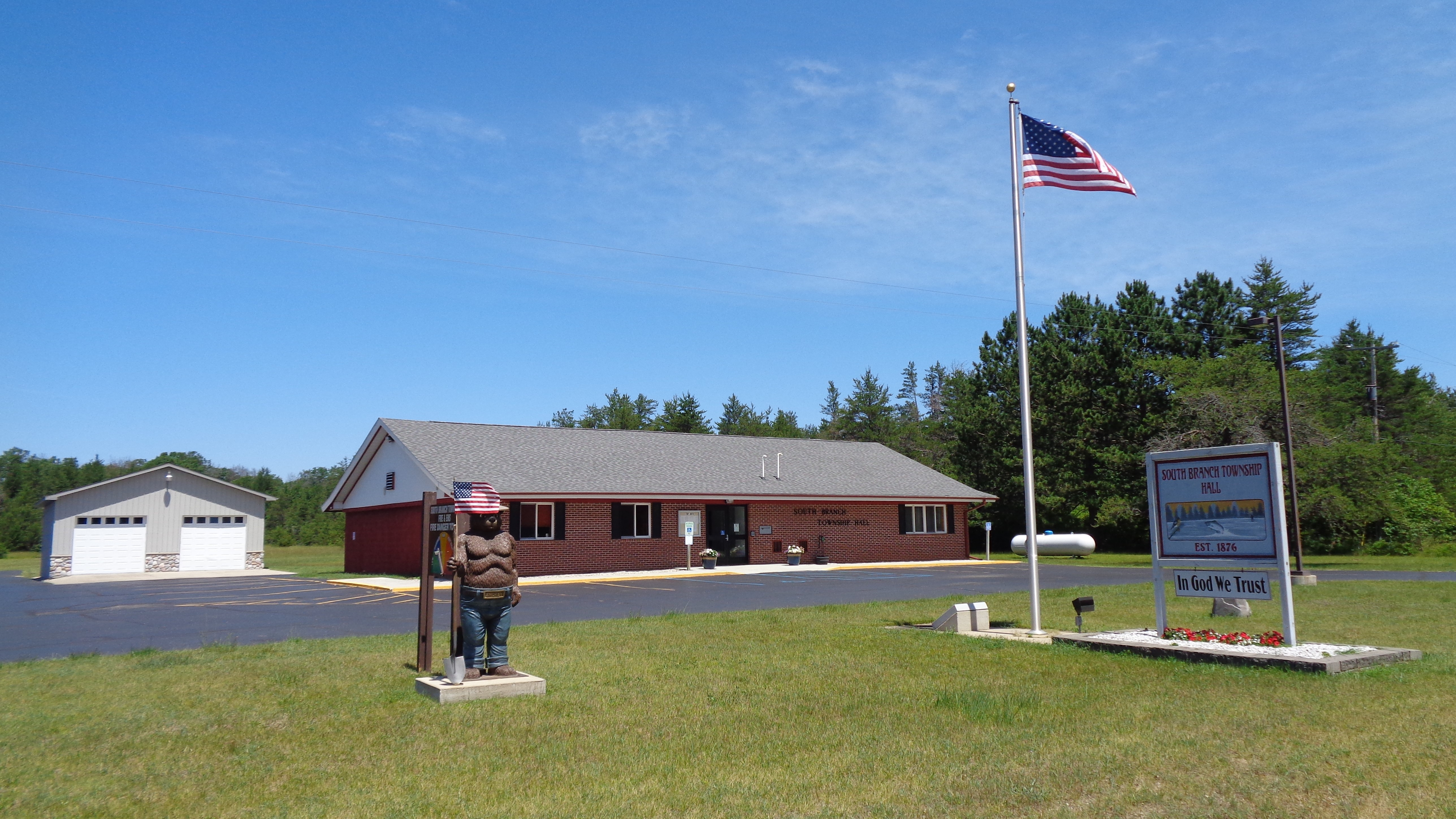
- South Branch Township Hall

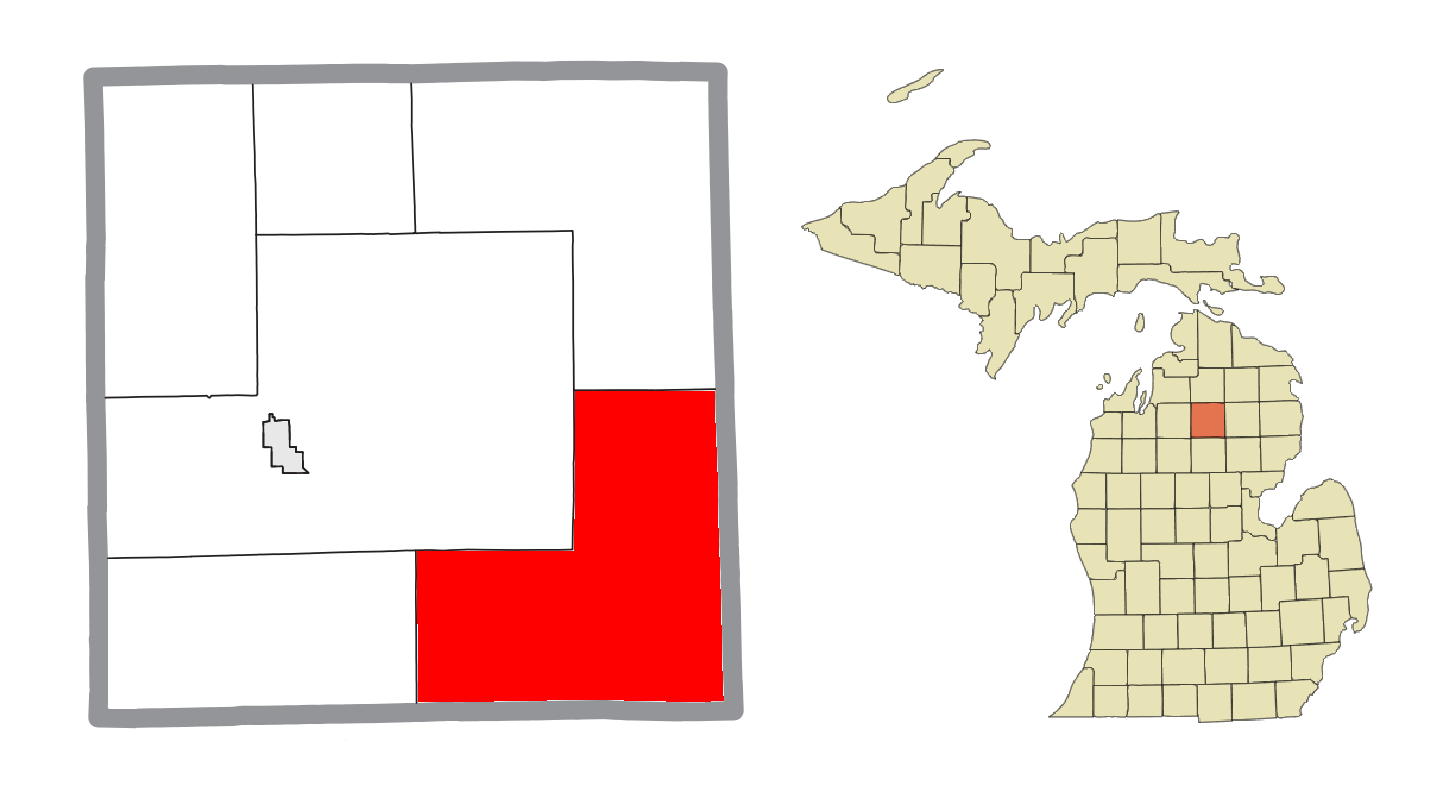
- Location within Crawford County

- Location within the state of Michigan Location within the United States
- Coordinates: 44°34′39″N 84°30′23″W
- Country: United States
- State: Michigan
- County: Crawford
- Established: 1876

Government
  - Supervisor: Laurie Luck
  - Clerk: Brenda Nelson

Area
  - Total: 105.56 sq mi (273.4 km^{2})
  - Land: 104.83 sq mi (271.5 km^{2})
  - Water: 0.73 sq mi (1.9 km^{2})
- Elevation: 1,135 ft (346 m)

Population (2020)
  - Total: 1,638
  - Density: 15.63/sq mi (6.033/km^{2})
- Time zone: UTC-5 (Eastern (EST))
  - Summer (DST): UTC-4 (EDT)
- Zip code(s): 48636 (Luzerne); 48653 (Roscommon); 49738 (Greenbush)
- Area code: 989
- FIPS code: 26-74760
- GNIS feature ID: 1627093
- Website: Official website

South Branch Township is a civil township of Crawford County in the U.S. state of Michigan. The population was 1,638 at the 2020 census.

== Communities ==
- Deerheart Valley is an unincorporated community located along the south branch of the Au Sable River at 44°32′13″N 84°34′14″W.
- Eldorado is an unincorporated community in the township along M-18 at 44°35′30″N 84°24′03″W. A post office named Jack Pine opened here from 1885 until 1898, and it was then renamed as Jackpine until 1908. The local residents petitioned to have the post office named changed to Eldorado, which was a name for a source of wealth that came from the area's abundant lumber resources. In 1908, the post office named changed to Eldorado, and it remained in operation under that name until being disestablished in 1952.

== Geography ==
According to the United States Census Bureau, the village has a total area of 105.56 square miles (273.40 km^{2}), of which 104.83 square miles (271.51 km^{2}) is land and 0.73 square miles (1.89 km^{2}) (0.69%) is water.

South Branch Township occupies the southeast corner of Crawford County and is bordered by Oscoda County to the east and Roscommon County to the south. The township takes its name from the South Branch of the Au Sable River, which flows nearly the length of the township, from the southwestern corner north and east to its mouth at the Au Sable River in the northern part of the township.

The Roscommon Zoo is located within the township along M-18.

=== Major highways ===
- M-18
- M-72
- F-97

== Demographics ==
As of the census of 2000, there were 1,842 people, 735 households, and 557 families residing in the township. The population density was 17.5 per square mile (6.7/km^{2}). There were 1,615 housing units at an average density of 15.3 per square mile (5.9/km^{2}). The racial makeup of the township was 99.35% White, 0.05% African American, 0.11% Native American, 0.11% Asian, and 0.38% from two or more races. Hispanic or Latino of any race were 0.49% of the population.

There were 735 households, out of which 28.4% had children under the age of 18 living with them, 65.4% were married couples living together, 6.5% had a female householder with no husband present, and 24.2% were non-families. 20.4% of all households were made up of individuals, and 7.6% had someone living alone who was 65 years of age or older. The average household size was 2.51 and the average family size was 2.88.

In the township the population was spread out, with 24.0% under the age of 18, 5.5% from 18 to 24, 24.3% from 25 to 44, 28.8% from 45 to 64, and 17.3% who were 65 years of age or older. The median age was 43 years. For every 100 females, there were 107.4 males. For every 100 females age 18 and over, there were 105.6 males.

The median income for a household in the township was $34,537, and the median income for a family was $38,690. Males had a median income of $32,386 versus $19,868 for females. The per capita income for the township was $16,763. About 9.2% of families and 12.5% of the population were below the poverty line, including 20.4% of those under age 18 and 8.9% of those age 65 or over.
