= Grayling Charter Township, Michigan =

Grayling Township, Michigan
- Charter township
- Grayling Charter Township
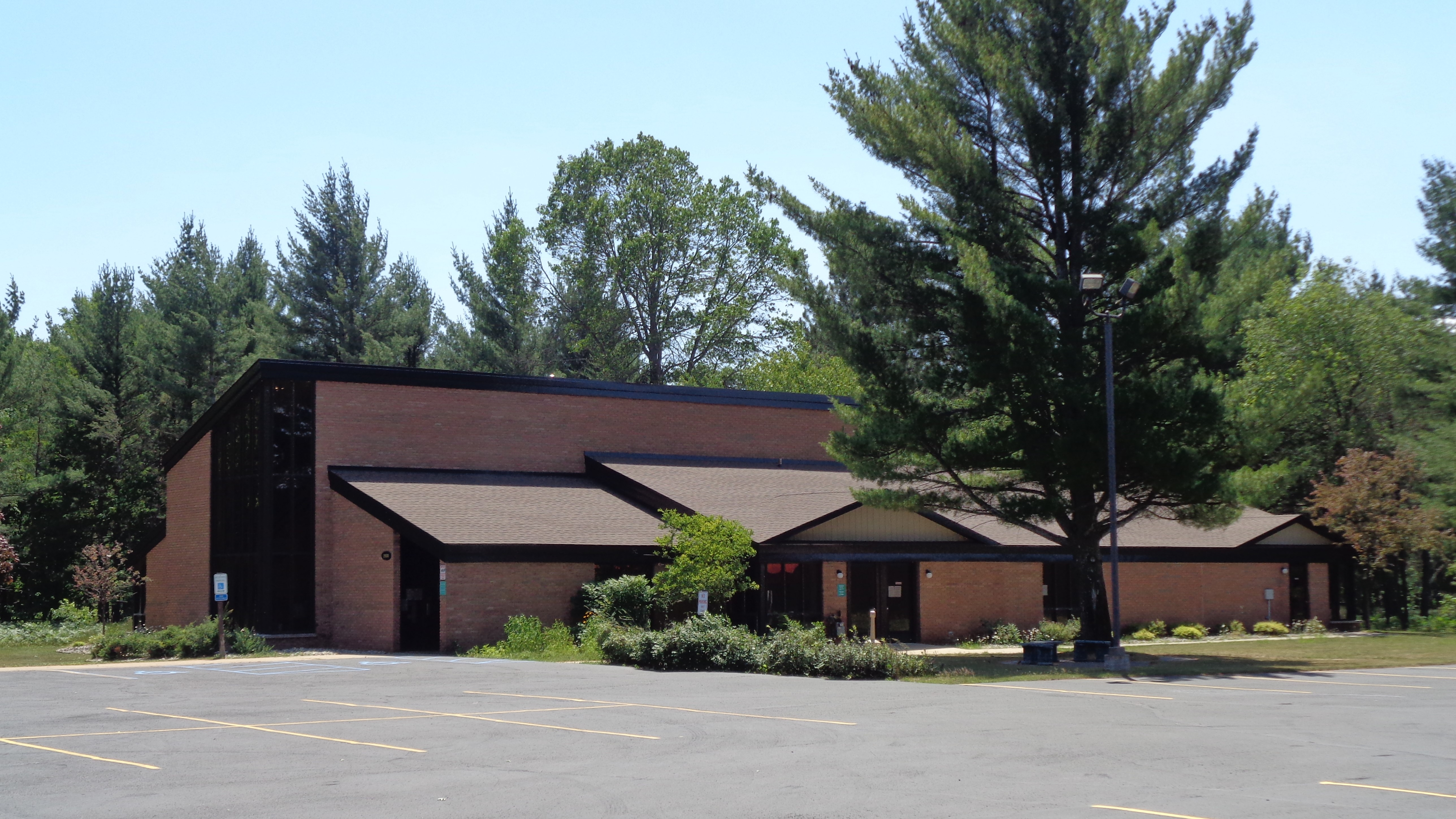
- Grayling Charter Township Offices
- Motto: "Where nature surrounds"
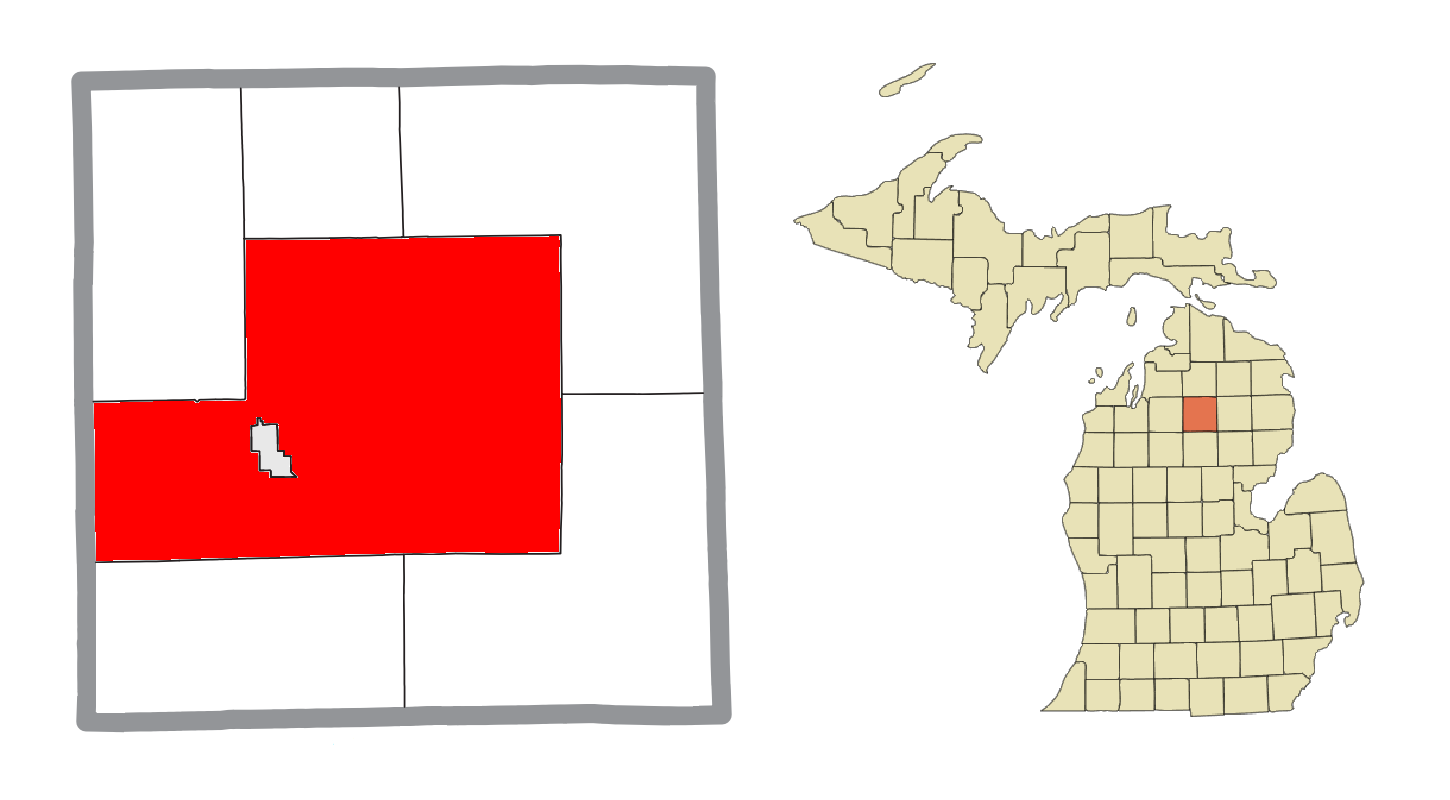
- Location within Crawford County

- Location within the state of Michigan Location within the United States
- Coordinates: 44°40′40″N 84°38′33″W
- Country: United States
- State: Michigan
- County: Crawford

Area
  - Total: 174.7 sq mi (452 km^{2})
  - Land: 170.7 sq mi (442 km^{2})
  - Water: 4.0 sq mi (10 km^{2})
- Elevation: 1,152 ft (351 m)

Population (2020)
  - Total: 5,642
  - Density: 33/sq mi (13/km^{2})
- Time zone: UTC-5 (Eastern (EST))
  - Summer (DST): UTC-4 (EDT)
- ZIP codes: 49733 (Frederic); 49738 (Grayling)
- Area code: 989
- FIPS code: 26-34660
- GNIS feature ID: 1626391
- Website: Official website

Grayling Charter Township is a charter township of Crawford County in the U.S. state of Michigan. The population was 5,642 as of the 2020 census, down from 5,827 at the 2010 census. The city of Grayling is surrounded by Grayling Charter Township, but both are administered autonomously.

== Communities ==
- Babbits Resort is an unincorporated community along the Au Sable River at 44°40′03″N 84°36′46″W.
- Bucks is an unincorporated community located within the township at 44°44′53″N 84°34′12″W. Bucks was settled by the Holloway Bucks family in 1870. Originally called Buck's Hill, it became a stop along the Michigan Central Railroad in 1889. It was then known as Buck's Crossing and served as a residency and stopover for the railroad builders. The name was later shorterned to Bucks. The community contains no more structures or residents, and it is now part of Camp Grayling.
- Collens Landing is an unincorporated community along the eastern shores of Lake Margrethe at 44°38′42″N 84°46′17″W.
- Danish Landing is an unincorporated community along the northeastern shores of Lake Margrethe at 44°39′27″N 84°46′48″W.
- Five Corners is an unincorporated community located along M-72 in the southeast portion of the township at 44°38′13″N 84°31′42″W.
- Lake Margrethe is an unincorporated community located along the eastern shores of Lake Margrethe just south of the community of Collens Landing at 44°38′30″N 84°46′13″W.
- Louis Cabin Landing is an unincorporated community located along the Au Sable River at 44°39′54″N 84°38′12″W.
- McIntyre Landing is an unincorporated community along the northernmost shores of Lake Margrethe at 44°39′54″N 84°48′30″W.
- Rasmus is an unincorporated community located within Camp Grayling at 44°37′48″N 84°46′30″W. Rasmus Hanson founded the community in 1914 along the shores of Lake Margrethe, which he named after his wife Margrethe. It became a stop along the Michigan Central Railroad as part of Camp Hanson, which later became Camp Grayling.
- Wildwood is an unincorporated community located along F-32 in the eastern portion of the township at 44°41′05″N 84°32′47″W.

== History ==
The township was named for the grayling fish that lived in the Au Sable River.

== Government ==
The township's supervisor leads township board meetings, develops the township budget, is the legal representative of the township, appoints members to local bodies and assists the assessor in valuations; building department is responsible for plan review, issues permits, inspections, code enforcement and recordkeeping; the tax assessor discovers, records and values real estate and personal property to create an annual roll for township property taxes; the clerk keeps the records and papers of the township, registers eligible voters and conducts elections; the township treasurer collects taxes, has custody of township funds and generates financial reports concerning investments, receipts and expenditures to the township board and state.

== Geography ==
According to the United States Census Bureau, the township has a total area of 174.40 square miles (451.69 km^{2}), of which 170.40 square miles (441.33 km^{2}) is land and 4.00 square miles (10.36 km^{2}) (2.29%) is water. Grayling Township is the second-largest charter township by land area in the state of Michigan (after Ironwood Township) and also the largest municipality by land area in the Lower Peninsula.

Grayling Township occupies a large area in the center of Crawford County and extends west to the border with Kalkaska County. The city of Grayling is located southwest of the township center, along Interstate 75, which serves the township with five exits. Camp Grayling, the main training facility for the Michigan National Guard, occupies all of the township west of the city of Grayling.

The Au Sable River flows west to east across the center of the township, joined by its East Branch from the north, while Lake Margrethe is in the western part of the township within Camp Grayling. Hartwick Pines State Park is also located within Grayling Township.

=== Major highways ===
- I-75
- BL I-75
- M-72
- M-93 (named locally as Hartwick Pines Road)
- F-32

== Demographics ==
As of the census of 2000, there were 6,516 people, 2,420 households, and 1,802 families residing in the township. The population density was 38.1 inhabitants per square mile (14.7/km^{2}). There were 3,945 housing units at an average density of 23.1 per square mile (8.9/km^{2}). The racial makeup of the township was 94.83% White, 3.04% African American, 0.48% Native American, 0.26% Asian, 0.08% from other races, and 1.32% from two or more races. Hispanic or Latino of any race were 0.80% of the population.

There were 2,420 households, out of which 32.5% had children under the age of 18 living with them, 60.6% were married couples living together, 9.4% had a female householder with no husband present, and 25.5% were non-families. 20.7% of all households were made up of individuals, and 8.5% had someone living alone who was 65 years of age or older. The average household size was 2.55 and the average family size was 2.91.

In the township the population was spread out, with 25.5% under the age of 18, 6.6% from 18 to 24, 28.8% from 25 to 44, 25.2% from 45 to 64, and 14.0% who were 65 years of age or older. The median age was 39 years. For every 100 females, there were 111.8 males. For every 100 females age 18 and over, there were 108.3 males.

The median income for a household in the township was $34,690, and the median income for a family was $37,963. Males had a median income of $30,973 versus $22,857 for females. The per capita income for the township was $17,355. About 9.1% of families and 11.7% of the population were below the poverty line, including 16.4% of those under age 18 and 4.4% of those age 65 or over.
