= Frederic Township, Michigan =

- Civil township
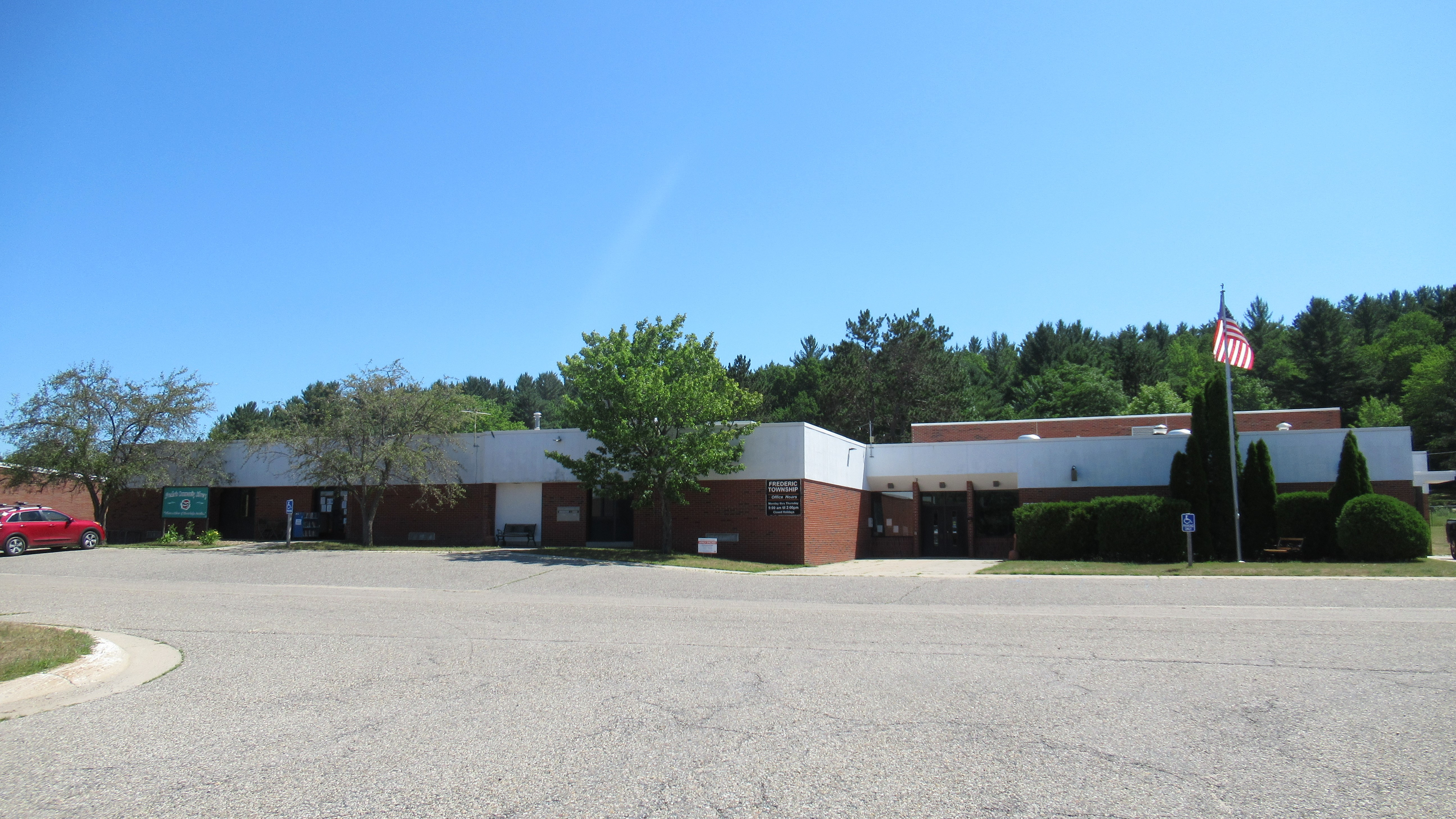
- Frederic Township Hall and Library

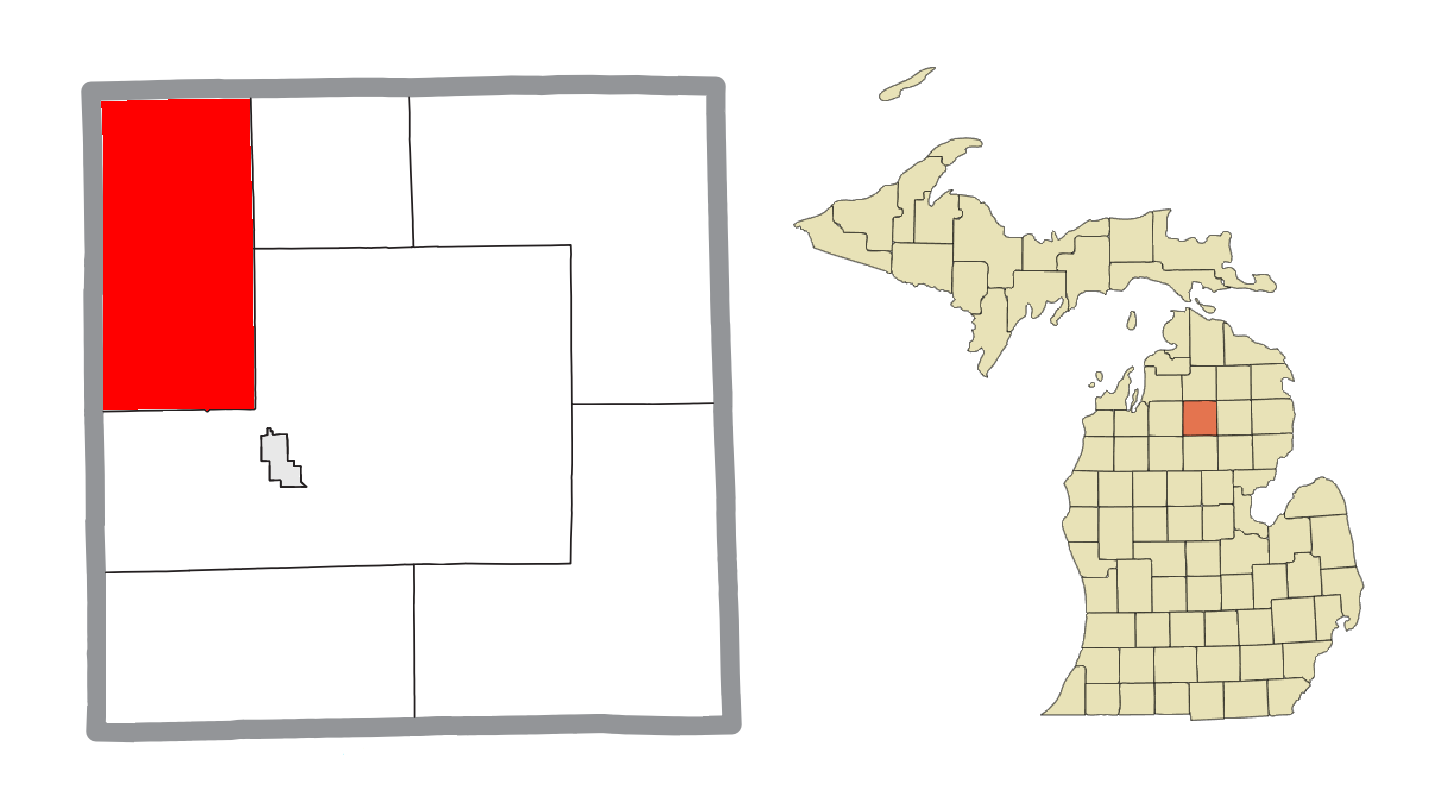
- Location within Crawford County

- Location within the state of Michigan Location within the United States
- Coordinates: 44°45′58″N 84°46′18″W
- Country: United States
- State: Michigan
- County: Crawford
- Established: November 20, 2020

Government
  - Supervisor: Brandon Gabriel
  - Clerk: Amanda Siwecki

Area
  - Total: 72.02 sq mi (186.5 km^{2})
  - Land: 71.40 sq mi (184.9 km^{2})
- Elevation: 1,342 ft (409 m)

Population (2020)
  - Total: 1,161
  - Density: 16.26/sq mi (6.278/km^{2})
- Time zone: UTC-5 (Eastern (EST))
  - Summer (DST): UTC-4 (EDT)
- ZIP code(s): 49733 (Frederic); 49735 (Gaylord); 49738 (Grayling)
- Area code: 989
- FIPS code: 26-30480
- GNIS feature ID: 1626311
- Website: Official website

U.S. Post Office in Frederic

Frederic Township is a civil township of Crawford County in the U.S. state of Michigan. The population was 1,161 at the 2020 census.

== Communities ==
- Deward is an uninhabited unincorporated community within the township at 44°50′26″N 84°49′36″W. Deward was named after lumbering magnate David Ward, whose heirs starting the community when they built a mill in 1901 to exploit that area's vast lumber resources. A post office opened on June 3, 1901. The mill operated until 1912, and by 1932, the community was deserted and the post office closed.
- Frederic is an unincorporated community in the northeast part of the township on the middle branch of the Au Sable River at 44°46′43″N 84°45′16″W. The Frederic 49733 ZIP Code serves a very large portion of the surrounding areas. Frederic was settled as a village around 1874 as a stop along the Michigan Central Railroad. It was originally called Forest, as it was part of Maple Forest Township. A post office was first established under the name Fredericville on December 17, 1877. The name was shortened to Frederic on August 4, 1886.
- Ishaward is an unincorporated community within the northwestern portion of the township at 44°48′48″N 84°50′22″W.

== Geography ==
According to the United States Census Bureau, the village has a total area of 72.02 square miles (186.53 km^{2}), of which 71.40 square miles (184.93 km^{2}) is land and 0.62 square miles (1.61 km^{2}) (0.86%) is water.

Frederic Township is in the northern part of the Lower Peninsula of Michigan and occupies the northwest corner of Crawford County, bordered by Otsego County to the north and Kalkaska County to the west. The Au Sable River flows southwards through the eastern part of the township, towards Grayling, while the Manistee River flows southwards through the western part of the township, then veers towards the southwest.

Hartwick Pines State Park and the Huron portion of the Huron-Manistee National Forests are nearby.

=== Major highways ===
- I-75 (passes north–south just east of Frederic Township)
- BL I-75
- M-72
- M-93

== Demographics ==
As of the census of 2000, there were 1,401 people, 555 households, and 397 families residing in the township. The population density was 19.5 inhabitants per square mile (7.5/km^{2}). There were 1,092 housing units at an average density of 15.2 per square mile (5.9/km^{2}). The racial makeup of the township was 97.14% White, 0.14% African American, 1.14% Native American, 0.07% Asian, and 1.50% from two or more races. Hispanic or Latino of any race were 1.21% of the population.

There were 555 households, out of which 31.0% had children under the age of 18 living with them, 56.2% were married couples living together, 9.9% had a female householder with no husband present, and 28.3% were non-families. 23.8% of all households were made up of individuals, and 9.7% had someone living alone who was 65 years of age or older. The average household size was 2.50 and the average family size was 2.91.

In the township the population was spread out, with 25.3% under the age of 18, 5.7% from 18 to 24, 24.6% from 25 to 44, 28.9% from 45 to 64, and 15.5% who were 65 years of age or older. The median age was 41 years. For every 100 females, there were 103.6 males. For every 100 females age 18 and over, there were 101.2 males.

The median income for a household in the township was $31,923, and the median income for a family was $35,250. Males had a median income of $31,058 versus $20,625 for females. The per capita income for the township was $15,273. About 9.8% of families and 12.1% of the population were below the poverty line, including 16.4% of those under age 18 and 11.9% of those age 65 or over.

== Recreation and tourism ==
- The headwaters of the Au Sable River are on its eastern border. The Manistee River is on its western border. Thousands of acres of rolling terrain, including state and national forest, lie in between.
- Frederic Township is home to numerous outdoor sports such as camping, canoeing, hiking, horseback riding, cross-country skiing, and trout fishing. It also offers hundreds of miles of off-road vehicle and snowmobile trails that are accessible from the village.
- Forbush Corners in Frederic is a world-recognized center for education and training in cross country skiing, and benefits from early and late snow due to a "snow belt micro climate". Accomplished amateur ski racer David Forbush designed, maintains and grooms "one of the finest privately owned systems in the Midwest."

== Notes ==
=== Sources ===
- Romig, Walter (October 1, 1986) [1973]. Michigan Place Names: The History of the Founding and the Naming of More Than Five Thousand Past and Present Michigan Communities (Paperback). Great Lakes Books Series. Detroit, Michigan: Wayne State University Press. pp. 155, 210. ISBN 978-0-8143-1838-6.
