= Business routes of Interstate 75 in Michigan =

Business Loop Interstate 75
- Business routes of Interstate 75 highlighted

Location
- Country: United States
- State: Michigan

Highway system
- Interstate Highway System; Main; Auxiliary; Suffixed; Business; Future; Michigan State Trunkline Highway System; Interstate; US; State; Byways
← I-75	→ M-75

There have been nine business routes for Interstate 75 in the US state of Michigan. Numbered either Business Loop Interstate 75 (BL I-75) or Business Spur Interstate 75 (BS I-75) depending if they are a full business loop or a business spur, these highways are former routings of I-75's predecessor highways in the state. They were designated as I-75 was completed through the various areas of Michigan. The business loop in Pontiac runs through that city's downtown along a section of Woodward Avenue and a segment of roadway formerly used by M-24. The former Saginaw business loop was once a part of US Highway 23 (US 23), as was most of the original Bay City business loop (that one has been converted into a business spur). The roadways that make up the business loops in West Branch and Roscommon were previously part of M-76, I-75's predecessor through that part of the state. In Northern Michigan, the Grayling and Gaylord BL I-75s were part of US 27, and the two business routes in St. Ignace and Sault Ste. Marie in the Upper Peninsula of Michigan were part of US 2. A tenth business route, a loop through Indian River has been proposed. Each of the business loops connects to I-75 on both ends and runs through their respective cities' downtown areas. The two business spurs only connect to I-75 on one end and run into the appropriate downtown.

== Pontiac ==
Business Loop Interstate 75
- Location: Pontiac
- Length: 8.384 mi (13.493 km)
- Existed: 1963–present

Business Loop I-75 (BL I-75) is a business loop serving Pontiac and Auburn Hills. It uses portions of former Business M-24 (Bus. M-24) through town. The highway starts as an eight-lane freeway at an interchange on I-75 in Bloomfield Township running westerly. The freeway continues past an interchange with Opdyke Road to end at Square Lake Road, dropping to six lanes. BL I-75 continues to M-1 at Woodward Avenue. Square Lake Road continues to the west as Bus. US 24, and BL I-75 turns northwesterly along the eight-lane divided Woodward Avenue, running concurrently with Bus. US 24 into downtown Pontiac. At the south side of downtown, Woodward drops to six lanes as the two directions of Woodward Avenue split and form a four-lane loop. The Woodward Avenue Loop encircles downtown Pontiac, and it is crossed by the eastbound direction of M-59 running on Huron Street. One block north, the westbound direction of M-59 runs along University Drive and turns to follow BL I-75/Bus. US 24 (Woodward Avenue Loop). The loop intersects Perry Street another block further north, and BL I-75 turns northeasterly onto the two-way Perry Street. (The southbound direction from Perry Street continues around the Woodward Avenue Loop back to Woodward Avenue.) BL I-75 passes through residential areas and a minor business area along the four-lane Perry Street. Outside of the downtown area, Perry Street widens to include a center turn lane. North of Walton Boulevard in Auburn Hills, the street name changes to Lapeer Road. BL I-75 intersects Opdyke Road a couple hundred feet west of I-75 before crossing the freeway. Lapeer Road continues as a six-lane, divided roadway to the ramps of a double trumpet interchange, where the BL I-75 designation ends. The roadway however, continues as M-24. On average each day in 2013, 9,829 vehicles use the business loop between the two M-59 junctions, and 73,795 vehicles do so on the freeway stub east of Opdyke Road, the lowest and highest traffic counts.

In 1919 when the state highway system was first numbered, the main north–south highway through Pontiac was numbered M-10, and it was renumbered to US 10 seven years later when the United States Numbered Highway System was created. By the next year, M-24 was designated from downtown Pontiac northward to Lapeer. M-24 was moved to an eastern bypass of town in 1936, and the former routing in town became M-24A. This was redesignated Bus M-24 in 1940.

A number of highway designation and routing changes in the Pontiac were made when US 10 was shifted out of downtown to replace M-58 along Telegraph Road west of downtown by the middle of 1961. Before the change, US 10 followed Dixie Highway and Oakland Avenue southeast into Pontiac to Perry Street and then Perry to Saginaw Street to Woodward while M-58 was routed along Telegraph and Square Lake roads. After the change, US 10 turned south from Dixie Highway onto Telegraph and then east onto Square Lake to connect back to Woodward. The old route through downtown was assigned the Bus. US 10 moniker and M-58 was decommissioned as a highway designation. Two years later, I-75 was completed to the east of Pontiac, and the M-24 bypass of the city was turned over to local control. The former Bus. M-24 through downtown was renumbered BL I-75 along with a connection along Square Lake Road out to the freeway. The next year, the streets downtown Pontiac were reconfigured and a loop called Wide Track Drive was created to route traffic around the downtown area. The former routing of BL I-75 on Perry Street in the downtown core was replaced by routing the business loops on Wide Track Drive. Then in 1966, an interchange was built to replace the intersection at Opdyke Road and Square Lake Road.

In 1985, the Michigan Department of Transportation (MDOT) received permission from the American Association of State Highway and Transportation Officials to truncate US 10 to Bay City, and when the change was made the following year, US 24 replaced US 10 on Telegraph Road north of Square Lake Road, and Bus. US 10 through downtown was redesignated Bus. US 24, including the segment concurrent with BL I-75. Saginaw Street south of downtown was renamed as a northern extension of Woodward Avenue, while Wide Track Drive through downtown was renamed as the Woodward Avenue Loop, both in 2000.

The section of BL I-75 that follows Woodward Avenue has a pair of special designations attached to it. In 1999, it was designated by MDOT as what is now called a Pure Michigan Byway. Three years later, it was named a National Scenic Byway by the Federal Highway Administration National Scenic Byways Program on June 13, 2002, the only urban road at the time with that classification. It was later upgraded to All-American Road status on October 16, 2009. In 2017, MDOT reconstructed the southern terminus, by replacing the left exit and entrance ramps by right exit and entrance ramps from northbound I-75.

Major intersections
The entire highway is in Oakland County.

Location	mi	km	Destinations	Notes
Bloomfield Township	0.000	0.000	I-75 – Flint, Detroit	Exit 75 on I-75
Bloomfield Township–Pontiac city line	1.304	2.099	Opdyke Road; Square Lake Road east	Interchange; western end of freeway stub; Square Lake Road signed southbound only
Bloomfield Township	2.142	3.447	Bus. US 24 south (Square Lake Road west) M-1 south (Woodward Avenue) – Detroit	Southern end of Bus. US 24 concurrency; northern terminus of M-1
Pontiac	2.424	3.901	Southern end of one-way Woodward Avenue Loop	
Pontiac	3.103	4.994	M-59 east (Huron Street)	Eastbound direction of M-59
Pontiac	3.183	5.123	M-59 west (University Drive)	Southern end of M-59 westbound concurrency around Woodward Avenue Loop
Pontiac	3.374	5.430	Bus. US 24 north / M-59 west (Woodward Avenue Loop) – Clarkston, Howell	Northern end of Bus. US 24/M-59 west concurrency; BL I-75 exits the Woodard Avenue Loop
Auburn Hills	7.892– 7.903	12.701– 12.719	M-24 north – Lake Orion	Southern terminus of M-24
Auburn Hills	8.362– 8.384	13.457– 13.493	I-75 – Flint, Detroit	Exit 81 on I-75
1.000 mi = 1.609 km; 1.000 km = 0.621 mi: Concurrency terminus

Browse numbered routes
← M-24	MI	→ US 25

== Saginaw ==
Business Loop Interstate 75
- Location: Saginaw
- Length: 7.338 mi (11.809 km)
- Existed: 1961–1971

Business Loop I-75 (BL I-75) was a business loop in Saginaw that was previously Business US Highway 23 (Bus. US 23). It started at an interchange between I-75/US 23 and M-46 (Holland Road) in Buena Vista Township. From there, it ran concurrently with M-46 westward into Saginaw. East of 17th Street, the highway split to form a one-way pairing with Remington Street, which carried westbound traffic. About three blocks farther west, BL I-75 split from M-46 to follow Genesee Avenue northwesterly into the downtown area. At an intersection between Genesee Avenue, Janes Street and 2nd Avenue, the northbound BL I-75 followed 2nd Avenue while southbound continued on Genesee Avenue. Northbound traffic traveled along 2nd Avenue and Johnson Street to Washington Avenue near the Saginaw River, where the two directions of traffic reunited. Washington Avenue also carried M-13/M-81, and the three designations ran concurrently together northward and parallel to the river. BL I-75/M-13/M-81 curved northeasterly north of downtown, and M-81 left the business loop at an intersection with Veterans Memorial Parkway; BL I-75/M-13 turned north on the parkway and M-81 continued easterly on Washington Avenue. The business loop proceeded northward running parallel to the river and ended at an interchange with I-75/US 23 in Zilwaukee Township; M-13 continued along Bay City Road north of the interchange.

When the state highway system was signposted in 1919, the north–south highway through Saginaw was part of the original M-10. This highway was later redesignated as part of US 23 when the United States Numbered Highway System was created in 1926. US 23 was initially routed on the western side of the Saginaw River through the city, but it was moved in 1929 to run along the eastern side. In 1953, the initial eastern bypass of Saginaw was built as a two-lane highway, and the former routing through downtown was redesignated Bus. US 23. This bypass was upgraded in 1961 to a full freeway as part of I-75/US 23, and the business loop through downtown was redesignated BL I-75. In 1971, I-675 was completed, and BL I-75 was decommissioned through Saginaw. The segments of the business loop that were concurrent with M-13, M-46 or M-81 remained part of those state highways, but the rest of BL I-75 was returned to local control.

Major intersections
The entire highway was in Saginaw County.

Location	mi	km	Destinations	Notes
Buena Vista Township	0.000	0.000	I-75 / US 23 – Mackinac Bridge, Flint M-46 east (East Holland Road) – Richville	Eastern end of M-46 concurrency
Saginaw	1.615	2.599	M-46 west (Remington Street) – Muskegon	Western end of M-46 concurrency
Saginaw	3.116	5.015	M-13 south (Washington Avenue) / M-81 west	Southern end of M-13/M-81 concurrency
Saginaw	5.309– 5.354	8.544– 8.616	M-81 east (Washington Avenue) – Caro	Northern end of M-81 concurrency
Zilwaukee Township	7.356– 7.338	11.838– 11.809	I-75 / US 23 – Mackinac Bridge, Flint M-13 north (Bay City Road) – Bay City	Northern end of M-13 concurrency
1.000 mi = 1.609 km; 1.000 km = 0.621 mi: Concurrency terminus

== Bay City ==
Business Spur Interstate 75
- Location: Bay City
- Length: 3.047 mi (4.904 km)
- Existed: 1961–present

Business Spur Interstate 75 (BS I-75) is a business spur running through Bay City following a section of the current routing of M-25 through town. Formerly a full business loop numbered Business Loop Interstate 75 (BL I-75), it followed what is now M-84 back to end at I-75/US 23 at exit 160 south of downtown. The business route also follows streets that previously were numbered Business US Highway 23 (Bus. US 23). The spur starts at exit 162 on I-75/US 23 at the same interchange where M-25 and US 10 end. BS I-75 runs concurrently along M-25, and for about the first 1 1/3 miles (2.1 km), the spur is a four-lane freeway bounded by residential subdivisions on either side. In Bangor Township, the freeway ends and BS I-75/M-25 splits into a one-way pairing of Thomas Street (eastbound) and Jenny Street (westbound). These two three-lane streets continue along a residential area on the west side of Bay City. East of intersections with Henry Street, the opposing sides of traffic merge back together near Veterans Memorial Park to cross the Saginaw River on the four-lane Veterans Memorial Bridge. On the eastern side of the river, BS I-75/M-25 splits again into the one-way pairing of the three-lane McKinley Street (westbound) and 7th Street (eastbound). Just three blocks east of the river, BS I-75 ends at the intersections with M-84 (Washington Avenue) in downtown Bay City. On average each day in 2013, 11,678 vehicles use the business loop east of the M-13 junction, and 29,391 vehicles do so west of the M-84 junction, the lowest and highest traffic counts.

When the state highway system was first signposted in 1919, the north–south highway through Bay City was part of the original M-10, and the east–west highway was numbered as part of M-20. When the United States Numbered Highway System was created in 1926, M-10 became part of US 23, although it was routed on the western side of the Saginaw River. The highway was rerouted to the eastern side of the river in 1929. By early 1941, US 23 was rerouted to cross the Saginaw River on the southern side of Bay City, and the former routing along Washington Avenue and Midland Street through downtown was renumbered Bus. US 23. When the I-75/US 10/US 23 freeway bypass west of Bay City opened in late 1961, the former routing of US 23 was replaced by M-13 and the former Bus. US 23, including connections along the former routing of M-47 southwest and M-20 west of Bay City, were redesignated as BL I-75. The BL I-75 designation lasted until 1971 when the southern half of BL I-75 was removed, converting the business loop into a business spur; the southern section was renumbered as part of an M-84 extension, and BS I-75 would then run along the section concurrent with M-25 only.

Major Intersections
The entire highway is in Bay County.

Location	mi	km	Destinations	Notes
Monitor Township	0.000– 0.014	0.000– 0.023	I-75 / US 23 – Mackinac Bridge, Saginaw US 10 west – Midland M-25 east – Bay City	Western end of M-25 concurrency; exit 162 on I-75/US 25; eastern terminus of US 10
Bangor Township	1.306	2.102	Eastern end of freeway	
Bay City	1.690	2.720	M-13 / LHCT north (Euclid Avenue) – Standish, Saginaw	Western end of LHCT concurrency
Bay City	2.589	4.167	John F. Kennedy Drive	Westbound exit only
Bay City	3.047	4.904	M-25 east / LHCT east M-84 south (Washington Avenue) – Saginaw	Eastern end of M-25/LHCT concurrency
1.000 mi = 1.609 km; 1.000 km = 0.621 mi: Concurrency terminus; Incomplete access

== West Branch ==
Business Loop Interstate 75
- Location: West Branch
- Existed: 1973–present

Business Loop Interstate 75 (BL I-75) is a business loop running through West Branch that was originally numbered Business M-76 (Bus. M-76). It starts at exit 212 south on I-75 south of West Branch. From that interchange, BL I-75 runs northward along Cook Road in Horton and West Branch townships past an outlet mall. North of the mall, the roadway has two lanes, one in each direction plus an intermittent center turn lane, and it curves first to the northeast through a rural section of the townships, and then after intersecting Old 76 Road, it turns northwesterly through a commercial area. On the eastern city limits, BL I-75 turns due west and runs concurrently with M-55 on the four-lane Houghton Avenue through downtown West Branch. On the western side of downtown, the business loop intersects the northern end of M-30 and narrows to two lanes. BL I-75/M-55 continues out of town, running past more businesses before meeting I-75 at exit 215. At that interchange, BL I-75 ends, and M-55 merges onto the freeway. On average each day in 2013, 10,682 vehicles use the business loop near the southern I-75 interchange, and 15,399 vehicles do so between the M-55 junction and 5th Street in downtown West Branch, the lowest and highest traffic counts.

When the state highway system was signposted in 1919, the highway running northwest–southeast through West Branch was numbered M-76 and the east–west highway was M-55. In the early 1970s, M-76 was being converted into a freeway between Standish and the Grayling area. In 1970, the freeway was built as far as the present-day exit 212, and the connection along Cook Road was built to allow M-76 to connect between the new freeway and its former routing. The next year, this freeway was completed to bypass West Branch to the south and west. The former route of M-76 through town with the connection along Cook Road was renumbered Bus. M-76. Two years later, I-75 was finished in the state, and the M-76 designation was decommissioned. The former Bus. M-76 was redesignated as BL I-75 at the same time.

Major intersections
The entire highway is in Ogemaw County.

Location	mi	km	Destinations	Notes
Horton Township	0.000	0.000	I-75 – Mackinac Bridge; Cook Road	Roadway continues southward as Cook Road
West Branch Township	1.552	2.498	Old 76	Formerly M-76
West Branch Township	2.495	4.015	M-55 east – Tawas City	Eastern end of M-55 concurrency
West Branch	3.593	5.782	M-30 south – Beaverton	Northern terminus of M-30
Ogemaw Township	5.525	8.892	I-75 / M-55 west – Mackinac Bridge, Saginaw, Houghton Lake	Western end of M-55 concurrency
1.000 mi = 1.609 km; 1.000 km = 0.621 mi: Concurrency terminus

== Roscommon ==
Business Loop Interstate 75
- Location: Roscommon
- Length: 6.935 mi (11.161 km)
- Existed: 1973–present

Business Loop Interstate 75 (BL I-75) is a business loop running through Roscommon. Starting at exit 239 along I-75, the business loop runs concurrently with M-18 northward along the two-lane Roscommon Road through rural Northern Michigan woodlands. When BL I-75/M-18 enters the village of Roscommon, it follows Lake Street northeasterly into downtown. At the intersection with 5th Street, BL I-75 turns northwesterly and separates from M-18. In the village, the business loop has three lanes, one in each direction with a center turn lane. The business loop continues past several businesses and exits the village as a two-lane road. BL I-75 curves to run due west along the Roscommon–Crawford county line on Federal Highway. At exit 244 on I-75, the business loop terminates while following the county line. On average each day in 2013, 1,531 vehicles use the business loop near the northern I-75 interchange, and 5,987 vehicles do so in downtown Roscommon south of the M-18 junction, the lowest and highest traffic counts.

When the state highway system was originally signposted in 1919, the highway running northwest–southeast through Roscommon was numbered M-76. In 1949, M-18 was extended north into Roscommon and then west along M-76. During the early 1970s, M-76 was being converted into a freeway to be used as part of I-75. In 1971, I-75 was completed southward from the Grayling area to what is now exit 239. Two years later, I-75 was completed between Roscommon and West Branch, and M-76 between the two communities was decommissioned. At the same time, M-18 was realigned to northeasterly out of Roscommon instead of following M-76 toward Grayling. BL I-75 was commissioned at this time to overlap M-18 from the freeway north into Roscommon and to replace the former M-18/M-76 west of the village to the new freeway.

Major intersections

County	Location	mi	km	Destinations	Notes
Roscommon	Higgins Township	0.000	0.000	I-75 – Mackinac Bridge, Saginaw M-18 south – Houghton Lake	Southern end of M-18 concurrency; exit 239 on I-75
Roscommon	Roscommon	3.026	4.870	M-18 north	Northern end of M-18 concurrency
Roscommon–Crawford county line	Gerrish–Beaver Creek township line	6.935	11.161	I-75 – Mackinac Bridge, Saginaw	Exit 244 on I-75
1.000 mi = 1.609 km; 1.000 km = 0.621 mi: Concurrency terminus

== Grayling ==
Business Loop Interstate 75
- Location: Grayling
- Length: 5.823 mi (9.371 km)
- Existed: 1961–present

Business Loop Interstate 75 (BL I-75) is a business loop running through Grayling. The southern end is at a partial interchange at exit 254 on I-75; only northbound I-75 traffic can access northbound BL I-75, and southbound BL I-75 traffic can only access southbound I-75. From this interchange, the business loop runs northward as a five-lane divided roadway through a commercial area and past the Grayling Golf Club. At the intersection with Huron Street (South Down River Road), BL I-75 merges with M-72. The two highways run concurrently and turn northwesterly along the five-lane undivided James Street. BL I-75/M-72 narrows to three lanes and crosses the Au Sable River and runs for about 3/4 mile (1.2 km) before intersecting Lake Street in downtown Grayling. There, M-72 turns southwesterly onto Lake Street, separating from the business loop. At the same intersection, M-93 turns north and merges with BL I-75 as the two run concurrently on the three-lane McClellan Street. BL I-75/M-93 intersects County Road F-32 (North Down River Road) and then passes the Camp Grayling Airfield. North of the airfield, the highway narrows to two lanes and curves to the northwest, exiting the city. At the intersection with Old 27 and Hartwick Pines Road, BL I-75/M-93 turns northeasterly onto the latter. They continue running concurrently to exit 259 on I-75 where the BL I-75 designation terminates. M-93 continues along Hartwick Pines Road north of the interchange. All of BL I-75 through Grayling is a part of the Strategic Highway Network, a component of the National Highway System, a network of roads important to the country's economy, defense, and mobility. On average each day in 2013, 1,407 vehicles use the business loop between Old 27 and I-75, and 18,467 vehicles do so in downtown Grayling south of the M-72 junction, the lowest and highest traffic counts, respectively.

When the state highway system was originally signposted in 1919, the north–south highway through Grayling was part of the original M-14. At that time, M-93 was only a spur from downtown Grayling to the future Camp Grayling. M-14 was later redesignated as part of US Highway 27 (US 27) in 1926. By 1932, M-93 was extended northward through Grayling to the state park. In 1940, M-72 was extended through the Grayling area. I-75 in the Grayling area opened in 1961 and, the former routing of US 27 through Grayling northward to Hartwick Pines Road back to I-75 was redesignated BL I-75.

Major intersections
The entire highway is in Crawford County.

Location	mi	km	Destinations	Notes
Grayling Township	0.000	0.000	I-75 south – Saginaw	Southbound exit and northbound entrance only; exit 254 on I-75
Grayling	0.677	1.090	M-72 east (Huron Street) – Mio	Southern end of M-72 concurrency
Grayling	1.387	2.232	M-72 west / M-93 south (Lake Street) – Traverse City	Northern end of M-72 concurrency; southern end of M-93 concurrency
Grayling	1.842	2.964	F-32 east (North Down River Road)	Western terminus of F-32
Grayling Township	5.823	9.371	I-75 M-93 north – Hartwick Pines State Park	Northern end of M-93 concurrency; exit 259 on I-75; roadway continues as M-93
1.000 mi = 1.609 km; 1.000 km = 0.621 mi: Concurrency terminus; Incomplete access

== Gaylord ==
Business Loop Interstate 75
- Location: Gaylord
- Length: 3.391 mi (5.457 km)
- Existed: 1986–present

Business Loop Interstate 75, or BL I-75 is a business loop running through Gaylord. The loop starts at exit 279 on I-75 in Bagley Township south of Gaylord. The highway follows the five-lane Otsego Avenue northward from the freeway into the city and though a commercial area. Otsego Avenue jogs eastward slightly south of 2nd Street, and then intersects M-32 (Main Street) in downtown Gaylord. BL I-75 turns west onto the five-lane Main Street and runs concurrently with M-32 through downtown. About five blocks each of that turn, BL I-75/M-32 meets I-75 at exit 282; BL I-75 ends while M-32 continues westward. On average each day in 2013, 8,289 vehicles use the business loop south of the M-32 junction, and 23,436 vehicles do so in downtown Gaylord along the M-32 concurrency, the lowest and highest traffic counts.

When the state highway system was first signposted in 1919, the main highway running north–south through Gaylord was part of the original M-14. This was renumbered as part of US Highway 27 (US 27) in 1926 after the United States Numbered Highway System was formed. I-75 was completed and US 27 was removed through the Gaylord area in 1962. The business loop was not created at that time, however. Instead, it was created in 1986.

Major intersections
The entire highway is in Otsego County.

Location	mi	km	Destinations	Notes
Bagley Township	0.000	0.000	I-75 – Mackinac Bridge, Saginaw; Old 27 south	Exit 279 on I-75; roadway continues south as Old 27
Gaylord	2.868	4.616	M-32 east – Alpena	Eastern end of M-32 concurrency
Gaylord	3.391	5.457	I-75 – Mackinac Bridge, Saginaw M-32 west – East Jordan	Western end of M-32 concurrency; exit 282 on I-75
1.000 mi = 1.609 km; 1.000 km = 0.621 mi: Concurrency terminus

== Indian River ==
Business Loop Interstate 75
- Location: Indian River
- Length: 3.975 mi (6.397 km)
- History: Proposed in 2015–17 to CCRC and MDOT

Business Loop Interstate 75 (BL I-75) is a proposed business loop that would run through Indian River. It would start at exit 310 on I-75 in Tuscarora Township and follow M-68 across the North Central State Trail near the Sturgeon River. In the community of Indian River, M-68 turns southwesterly on South Straits Highway, and BL I-75 would turn northward into downtown. The business loop would run through downtown, passing several businesses, and cross the Indian River on the north side of the business district. North of the river, South Straits Highway continues to parallel the North Central State Trail and passes the Indian River Golf Club. North of the club, the roadway runs through forest land and past the occasional business before meeting I-75 at exit 310. This interchange is the southern terminus of M-27, and it would serve as the future northern terminus of BL I-75.

Prior to the construction of the I-75 freeway, South Straits Highway was the route of US Highway 27 (US 27) through the Indian River area. In November 1960, sections of I-75 freeway opened from Indian River north to the southern Mackinac Bridge approaches in Mackinaw City, By the end of the following year, I-75 was completed between Gaylord and Grayling. US 27 was truncated to terminate south of Grayling, and the former route through Indian River and Gaylord was redesignated "To I-75" on maps. In 1962, the remaining freeway bypass of Indian River was completed. At that time, South Straits Highway through Indian River between M-68 and M-27 was turned over to local control as a county road. M-68 was first designated between Indian River and Alanson by 1936, and eastward by 1946 toward Afton.

A business loop for Indian River was first proposed to the Cheboygan County Road Commission (CCRC) in June 2015. At the time, the road commission had recently placed the bridge on South Straits Highway over the Indian River with a new structure up to Michigan Department of Transportation (MDOT) standards and was repaving the roadway north of the river to the I-75 interchange. The CCRC held a community forum in June 2016, and many local residents and businesses supported the designation at the time. The Tuscarora Township Board and Downtown Development Authority have expressed interesting in paying for the necessary signage should MDOT and the CCRC move forward to apply for the designation from the American Association of State Highway and Transportation Officials. The township board has passed a resolution in support of the BL I-75 designation.

Major intersections
The entire highway is in Cheboygan County.

Location	mi	km	Destinations	Notes
Tuscarora Township	0.000– 0.287	0.000– 0.462	I-75 – Mackinac Bridge, Saginaw M-68 east – Rogers City	Eastern end of M-68 concurrency; exit 310 on I-75; roadway continues eastward as M-68
Indian River	0.593	0.954	M-68 west – Alanson	Western end of M-68 concurrency
Tuscarora Township	3.413– 3.975	5.493– 6.397	I-75 – Mackinac Bridge, Saginaw M-27 north – Topinabee, Cheboygan	Exit 313 on I-75; southern terminus of M-27; roadway continues northward as M-27
1.000 mi = 1.609 km; 1.000 km = 0.621 mi: Concurrency terminus

== St. Ignace ==
Business Loop Interstate 75
- Location: St. Ignace
- Length: 4.719 mi (7.594 km)
- Existed: 1960–present
- Tourist routes: Lake Huron Circle Tour

Business Loop Interstate 75 (BL I-75) is a business loop running through St. Ignace. The loop starts at exit 344 on I-75 as the continuation of US Highway 2 (US 2) into downtown. The highway carries the Lake Huron Circle Tour (LHCT). It runs along a four-lane roadway on the north side of Straits State Park and curves northward into downtown St. Ignace along State Street. BL I-75 has three lanes and runs along the lakefront past the marina and docks for Mackinac Island ferry services. It widens back to four lanes to follow the curve of East Moran Bay and then turns inland past several hotels situated on a point jutting into the bay. North of the point, BL I-75 follows the Lake Huron shoreline past the Mackinac County Airport. North of the airport, the adjacent properties are primarily residential with a few tourist-oriented businesses. The business loop intersects County Road H-63 (Mackinac Trail) and comes to an end near Castle Rock at exit 348 on I-75 in St. Ignace Township. On average each day in 2013, 4,327 vehicles use the business loop near the northern I-75 interchange, and 8,819 vehicles do so near the southern I-75 interchange, the lowest and highest traffic counts.

The first state highway through St. Ignace was an extension of US 31 that was added by the end of 1927. In 1936, US 2 was realigned to run into downtown St. Ignace from the west and replaced US 31 through town. The business loop was commissioned in 1960 when the I-75/US 2 freeway opened, and the former route of US 2 through downtown was renumbered BL I-75.

Major intersections
The entire highway is in Mackinac County.

Location	mi	km	Destinations	Notes
St. Ignace	0.000	0.000	I-75 / GLCT – Mackinac Bridge US 2 west / LMCT west – Escanaba, Manistique	Southern end of LHCT concurrency; eastern terminus of US 2; exit 344 on I-75
St. Ignace	0.460	0.740	Ferry Lane	Former M-122
St. Ignace Township	4.396	7.075	H-63 north (Mackinac Trail) – Sault Ste. Marie	Southern terminus of H-63
St. Ignace Township	4.719	7.594	I-75 / LHCT north – Sault Ste. Marie, Mackinac Bridge	Northern end of LHCT concurrency; exit 348 on I-75
1.000 mi = 1.609 km; 1.000 km = 0.621 mi: Concurrency terminus

== Sault Ste. Marie ==
Business Spur Interstate 75
- Location: Sault Ste. Marie
- Length: 5.867 mi (9.442 km)
- Existed: 1962–present

Business Spur Interstate 75 (BS I-75) is a business spur running through Sault Ste. Marie. It starts at exit 392 on I-75 on the south side of the city. From that interchange, it runs eastward along the five-lane-wide 3 Mile Road and intersects the northern end of County Road H-63 (Mackinac Trail) before curving northeasterly. The spur runs through commercial areas and intersects the northern end of M-129 (Dixie Highway) before turning due north along Ashmun Street near the Sault Ste. Marie Municipal Airport. Ashmun Street narrows to four lanes north of 10th Avenue and regains a center turn lane at Adams Avenue. BS I-75 turns northeasterly past Easterday Avenue and runs to the east of the campus of Lake Superior State University, crossing the Edison Sault Power Canal. At Portage Avenue south of the Soo Locks, BS I-75 turns southeasterly to follow Portage Avenue along the St. Marys River. The business spur crosses the canal again just upstream from its mouth. Portage Avenue continues through residential neighborhoods on the east side of Sault Ste. Marie, following the river. BS I-75 ends at the entrance to the Sugar Island Ferry Dock across from the Sault Ste. Marie Country Club. On average each day in 2013, 1,433 vehicles used the business spur near the I-75 interchange, and 19,962 vehicles do so north of the M-129 junction, the lowest and highest traffic counts.

When the state highway system was first signposted in 1919, the north–south state highway in Sault Ste. Marie was numbered M-12 in 1919. It was renumbered as part of US 2 in 1926. In 1962, the I-75/US 2 freeway was completed, and the former route of US 2 through downtown along with a connection to I-75/US 2 and the International Bridge was redesignated BS I-75. In 1989, the designation was extended along Portage Avenue to the Sugar Island Ferry Dock.

Major intersections
The entire highway is in Sault Ste. Marie, Chippewa County.

mi	km	Destinations	Notes
0.000	0.000	I-75 north / GLCT – Bridge to Canada, St. Ignace	Western end of LHCT concurrency; exit 392 on I-75
0.620	0.998	H-63 south (Mackinac Trail)	Northern terminus of H-63
1.885	3.034	M-129 south / LHCT south	Eastern end of LHCT concurrency; northern terminus of M-129
5.867	9.442	Sugar Island Ferry Dock	
1.000 mi = 1.609 km; 1.000 km = 0.621 mi: Concurrency terminus
