= Beaver Creek Township, Michigan =

- Civil township
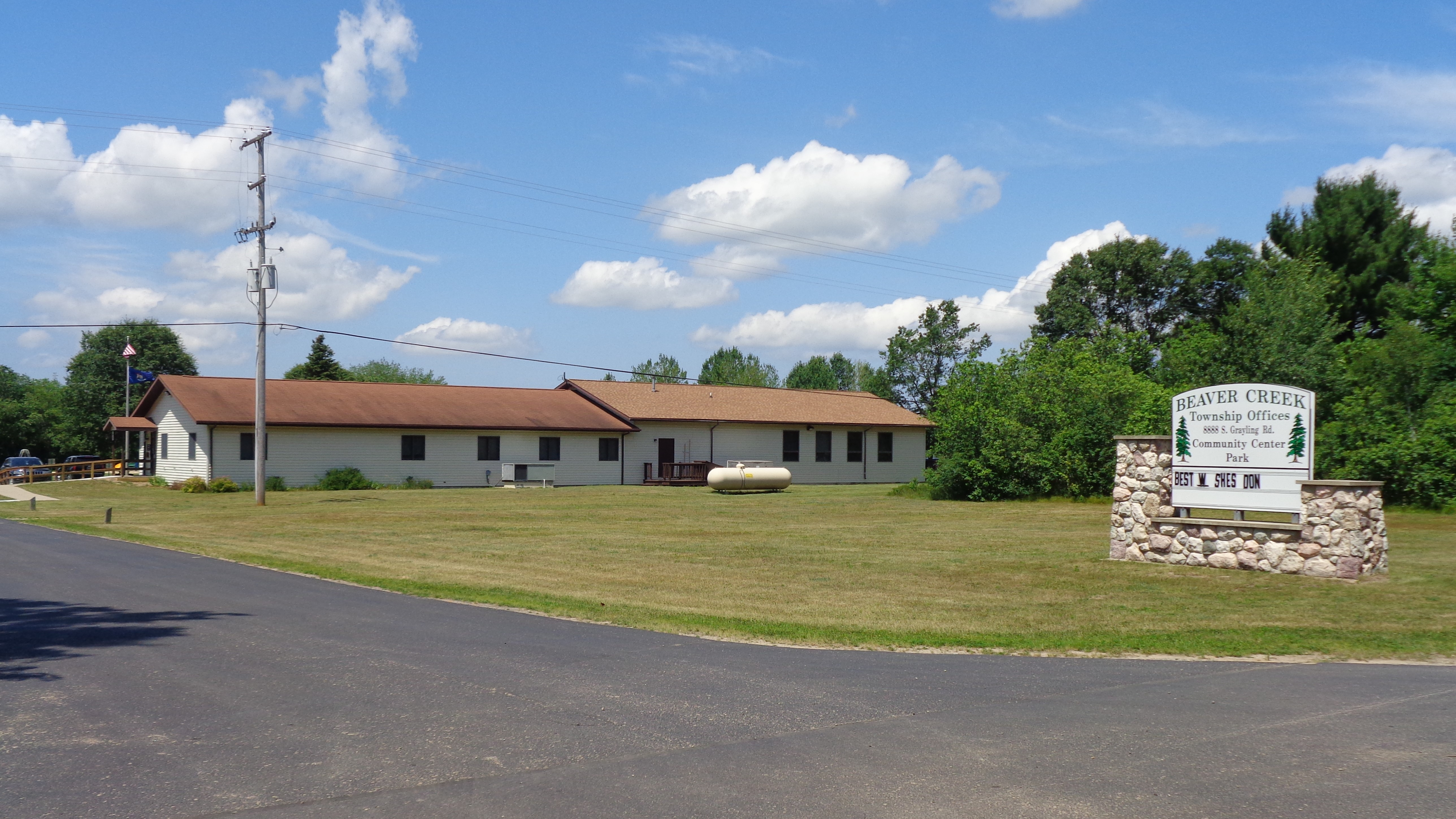
- Beaver Creek Township Offices

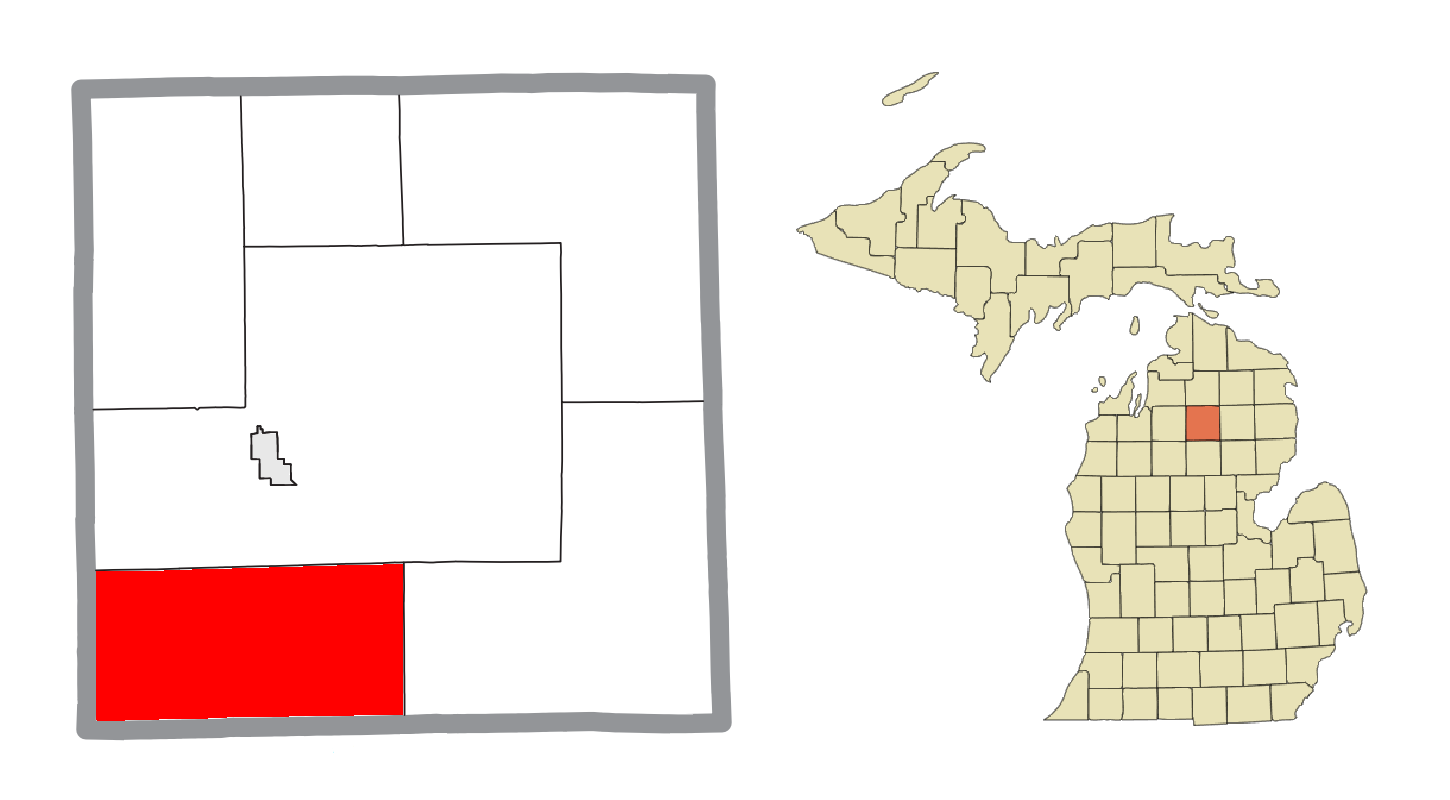
- Location within Crawford County

- Location within the state of Michigan Location within the United States
- Coordinates: 44°32′31″N 84°43′58″W
- Country: United States
- State: Michigan
- County: Crawford

Area
  - Total: 71.56 sq mi (185.3 km^{2})
  - Land: 71.46 sq mi (185.1 km^{2})
  - Water: 0.10 sq mi (0.26 km^{2})
- Elevation: 1,207 ft (368 m)

Population (2020)
  - Total: 1,515
  - Density: 21.20/sq mi (8.186/km^{2})
- Time zone: UTC-5 (Eastern (EST))
  - Summer (DST): UTC-4 (EDT)
- ZIP code(s): 48653 (Roscommon); 49738 (Grayling)
- Area code: 989
- FIPS code: 26-06600
- GNIS feature ID: 1625902
- Website: Official website

Beaver Creek Township is a civil township of Crawford County in the U.S. state of Michigan. As of the 2020 census, the township population was 1,515.

The township borders the northern coast of Higgins Lake and includes North Higgins Lake State Park. Interstate 75 passes through the township, and the northern terminus of U.S. Route 127 is at Interstate 75 within the township.

== Communities ==
- Pere Cheney is an uninhabited unincorporated community in the northeastern portion of the township at 44°34′39″N 84°38′16″W.
- Skyline Village is an unincorporated community located near the junction of Interstate 75 and U.S. Route 127 at 44°34′16″N 84°42′08″W.

== Geography ==
According to the United States Census Bureau, the village has a total area of 71.56 square miles (185.34 km^{2}), of which 71.46 square miles (185.08 km^{2}) is land and 0.10 square miles (0.26 km^{2}) (0.14%) is water.

Beaver Creek Township occupies the southwest corner of Crawford County and is bordered by Kalkaska County to the west and Roscommon County to the south. The township is crossed by Interstate 75 and U.S. Route 127, limited-access highways that join near the northern border of the township. I-75 leads north to Grayling, the Crawford County seat, and to the Straits of Mackinac, while heading southeast to Bay City and Saginaw. US 127 leads south to Mount Pleasant.

== Highways ==
- I-75
- BL I-75 (named locally as Old 76 or West Federal Highway)
- US 127 (terminus with Interstate 75)

== Demographics ==
As of the census of 2000, there were 1,486 people, 603 households, and 458 families residing in the township. The population density was 20.8 inhabitants per square mile (8.0/km^{2}). There were 1,125 housing units at an average density of 15.8 per square mile (6.1/km^{2}). The racial makeup of the township was 96.57% White, 0.20% African American, 0.87% Native American, 0.20% Pacific Islander, 1.35% from other races, and 0.81% from two or more races. Hispanic or Latino of any race were 1.95% of the population.

There were 603 households, out of which 28.4% had children under the age of 18 living with them, 63.2% were married couples living together, 7.6% had a female householder with no husband present, and 23.9% were non-families. Of all households, 20.7% were made up of individuals, and 8.8% had someone living alone who was 65 years of age or older. The average household size was 2.46 and the average family size was 2.81.

In the township the population was spread out, with 22.5% under the age of 18, 6.4% from 18 to 24, 26.6% from 25 to 44, 28.7% from 45 to 64, and 15.8% who were 65 years of age or older. The median age was 42 years. For every 100 females, there were 104.7 males. For every 100 females age 18 and over, there were 102.6 males.

The median income for a household in the township was $36,613, and the median income for a family was $38,690. Males had a median income of $35,000 versus $20,938 for females. The per capita income for the township was $18,388. About 7.4% of families and 9.7% of the population were below the poverty line, including 9.3% of those under age 18 and 4.4% of those age 65 or over.
