= Maple Forest Township, Michigan =

- Civil township
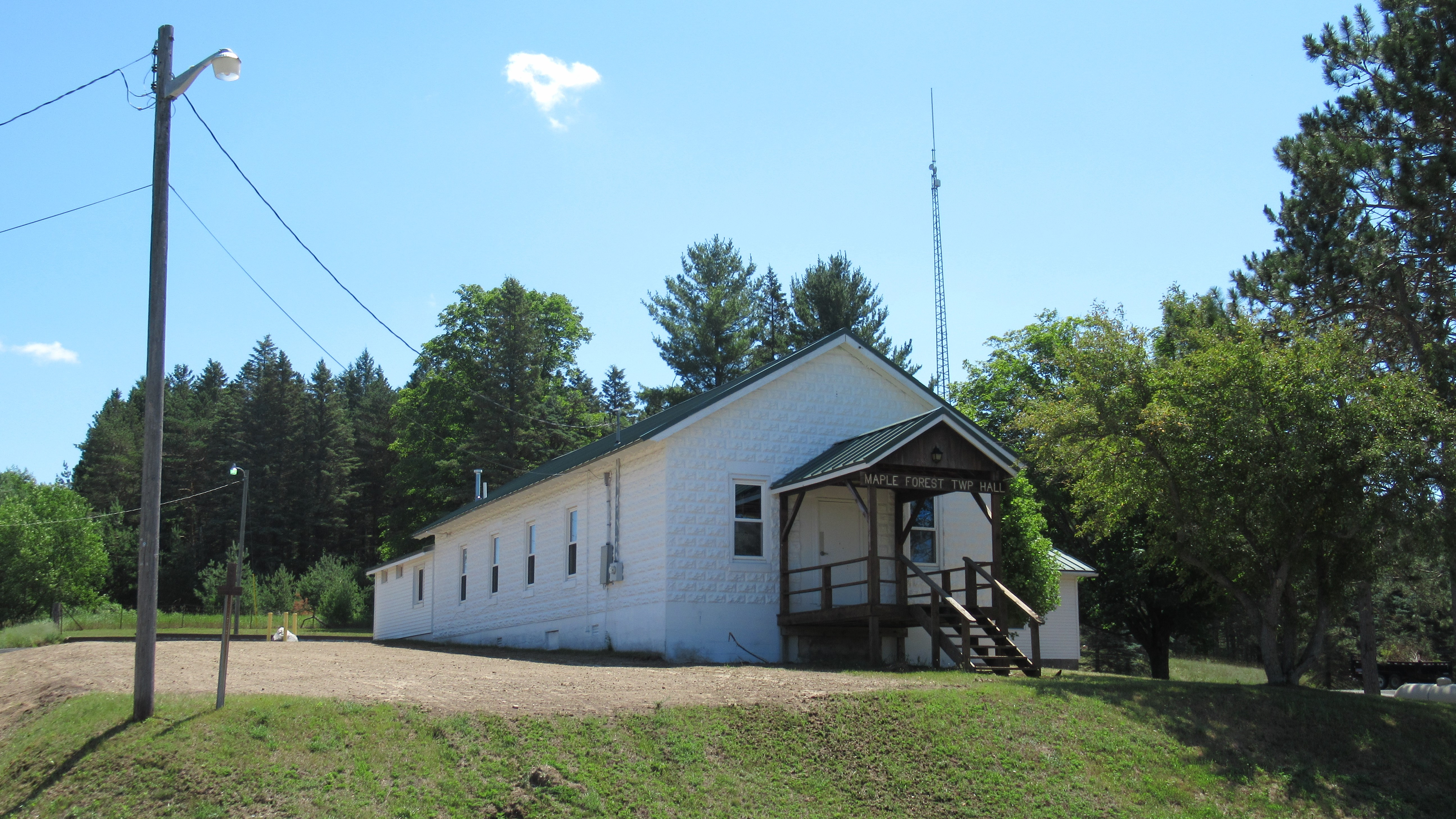
- Maple Forest Township Hall

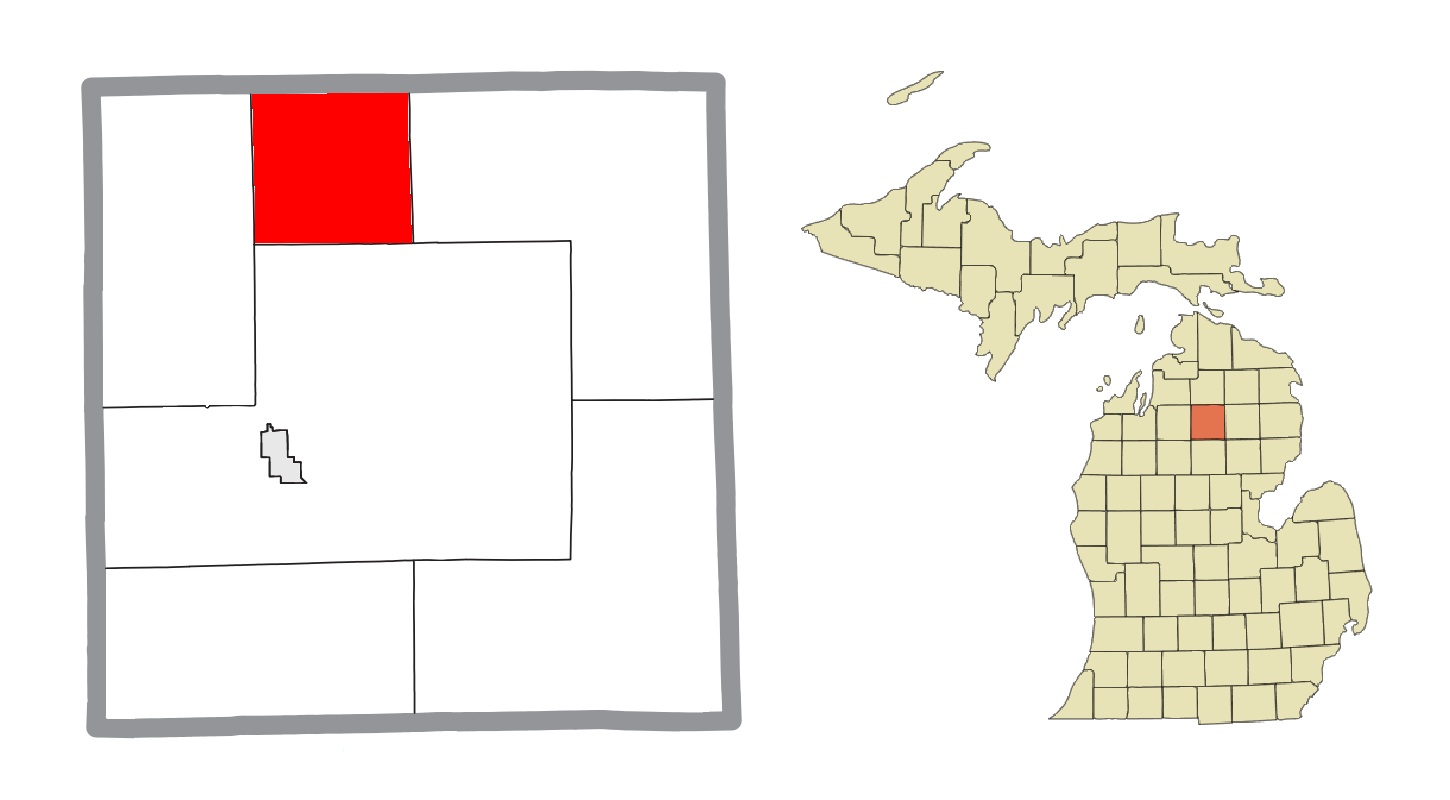
- Location within Crawford County

- Location within the state of Michigan Location within the United States
- Coordinates: 44°49′17″N 84°40′35″W
- Country: United States
- State: Michigan
- County: Crawford
- Established: 1877

Government
  - Supervisor: Tom Coors
  - Clerk: Sandra Baynham

Area
  - Total: 35.59 sq mi (92.2 km^{2})
  - Land: 35.30 sq mi (91.4 km^{2})
  - Water: 0.29 sq mi (0.75 km^{2})
- Elevation: 1,329 ft (405 m)

Population (2020)
  - Total: 598
  - Density: 16.9/sq mi (6.54/km^{2})
- Time zone: UTC-5 (Eastern (EST))
  - Summer (DST): UTC-4 (EDT)
- ZIP code(s): 49733 (Frederic); 49738 (Grayling)
- Area code: 989
- FIPS code: 26-50940
- GNIS feature ID: 1626673
- Website: Official website

Maple Forest Township is a civil township of Crawford County in the U.S. state of Michigan. The population was 598 at the 2020 census.

The township was named from groves of maple trees within its borders.

== Communities ==
- Forbush Corner is an unincorporated community in the southwestern portion of the township at 44°47′08″N 84°42′23″W.

== Geography ==
According to the United States Census Bureau, the village has a total area of 35.59 square miles (92.18 km^{2}), of which 35.30 square miles (91.43 km^{2}) is land and 0.29 square miles (0.75 km^{2}) (0.81%) is water.

Maple Forest Township is located in northern Crawford County and is bordered by Otsego County to the north. Interstate 75 runs north–south across the west side of the township, providing access at Exit 264.

=== Major highways ===
- I-75 runs through the western portion of the township.

== Demographics ==
As of the census of 2000, there were 498 people, 201 households, and 156 families residing in the township. The population density was 14.1 inhabitants per square mile (5.4/km^{2}). There were 438 housing units at an average density of 12.4 per square mile (4.8/km^{2}). The racial makeup of the township was 97.79% White, 0.60% Native American, 0.20% Asian, and 1.41% from two or more races. Hispanic or Latino of any race were 0.60% of the population.

There were 201 households, out of which 23.9% had children under the age of 18 living with them, 66.2% were married couples living together, 8.5% had a female householder with no husband present, and 21.9% were non-families. 17.9% of all households were made up of individuals, and 6.0% had someone living alone who was 65 years of age or older. The average household size was 2.48 and the average family size was 2.75.

In the township the population was spread out, with 21.1% under the age of 18, 5.4% from 18 to 24, 27.3% from 25 to 44, 30.1% from 45 to 64, and 16.1% who were 65 years of age or older. The median age was 43 years. For every 100 females, there were 109.2 males. For every 100 females age 18 and over, there were 100.5 males.

The median income for a household in the township was $38,235, and the median income for a family was $39,028. Males had a median income of $36,944 versus $18,409 for females. The per capita income for the township was $21,507. About 6.7% of families and 7.6% of the population were below the poverty line, including 4.8% of those under age 18 and none of those age 65 or over.
