= Grayling Army Airfield =

Grayling AAF
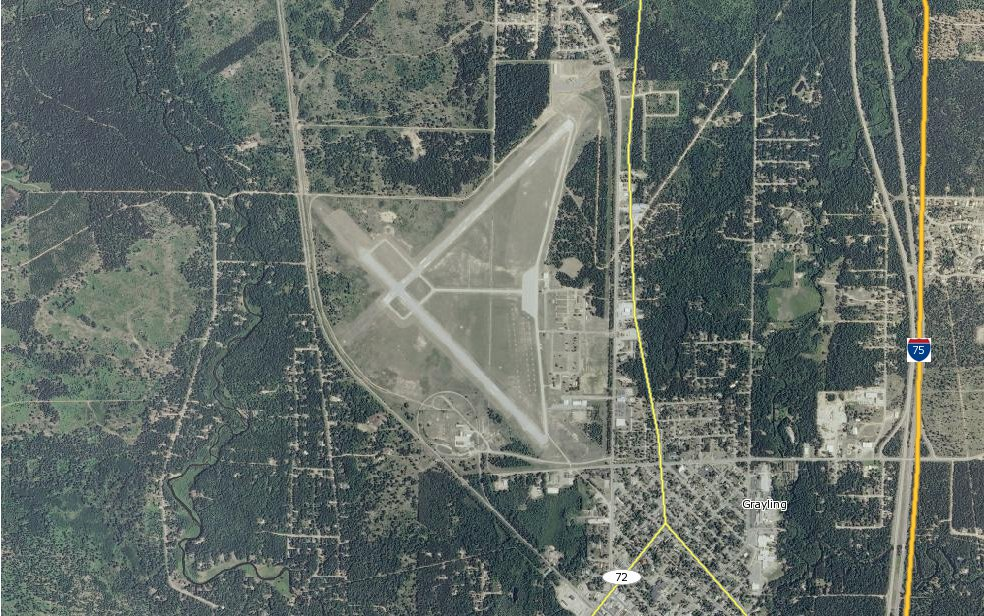
- IATA: none; ICAO: KGOV; FAA LID: GOV

Summary
- Airport type: Public / military
- Owner: United States Army
- Operator: Michigan National Guard
- Location: Grayling, Michigan vicinity
- Opened: 1929
- In use: 1929 – present
- Elevation AMSL: 1,158 ft (353 m)
- Coordinates: 44°40′49″N 084°43′44″W

Map
- Location of airport in Michigan GOV (the United States)

Runways
Direction	Length		Surface
Direction	ft	m	Surface
5/23	5,000	1,524	Concrete
14/32	5,000	1,524	Asphalt

Statistics (2019)
- Aircraft operations: 11,000
- Source: Federal Aviation Administration

Grayling Army Airfield (ICAO: KGOV, FAA LID: GOV) is a public/military use airport located one nautical mile (1.85 km) northwest of the central business district of Grayling, in Crawford County, Michigan, United States. It is owned by United States Army. The airfield is located 7 miles (11 km) northeast of the main cantonment area of Camp Grayling and just outside the city limits of Grayling. It is included in the Federal Aviation Administration (FAA) National Plan of Integrated Airport Systems for 2017–2021, in which it is categorized as a general aviation facility.

Grayling AAF covers an area of 923 acres (374 ha) at an elevation of 1,158 feet (353 m) above mean sea level. For the 12-month period ending December 31, 2008, the airport had 4,691 aircraft operations, an average of 10 per day: 63% general aviation and 37% military.

Although most U.S. airports use the same three-letter location identifier for the FAA and IATA, this airport is assigned GOV by the FAA but has no designation from the IATA (which assigned GOV to Gove Airport in Australia).

== History ==
Camp Grayling itself has existed since 1913, while the airport was constructed in 1927–1929 for use by the National Guard Air Squadron of Detroit. The runways were hard surfaced in 1933 and the entire airport was turned over to the federal government for military use during World War II. The airfield was known, for a time, as McNamara Field.

In 2022, the State of Michigan authorized $1 million to go towards expansions to the airport. Up to 250 square miles of public land could be repurposed for the base in general. The plans were opposed by conservation groups, citing potential environmental and economic impacts.

The airport received an additional $100 million in 2023 for modernization efforts, including a goal to address the inequities that female service members face as well as efforts to increase recruitment of women in the area.

== Military Use ==
The airport is part of Camp Grayling, the largest National Guard training facility in the United States.

In 2020, the Michigan National Guard officially unveiled the National All-Domain Warfighting Center to train in a variety of operations, including sea, land, air, space, and cyber. The airport is the base for aircraft that use 147,000 acres of multi-use ranges and maneuver courses to accommodate a variety of air-to-air and air-to-ground training exercises. The airport is also a training hub for national guard units from surrounding states.

== Facilities and aircraft ==
The airfield consists of two 5000x150-foot runways with 1,200-foot (370 m) overrun and 50-foot (15 m) wide connecting taxiways.

- Runway 5/23: 5,000 x 150 ft (1,524 x 46 m), surface: concrete
- Runway 14/32: 5,005 x 150 ft (1526 x 46 m), surface: asphalt

Runway 5/23 and taxiways A/D/E are closed during the winter months, since there is no snow removal on these surfaces.

The airport is staffed from dawn until dusk. The 29,000-square-foot (2,700 m^{2}) parking area can accommodate fixed-wing aircraft with parking for 100 helicopters, 50 with cement pads with a total of 70 tie downs. The control tower was recently upgraded to a STVS (Small Tower Voice Switch) system with positions in three different locations. There is an 800-square-foot (74 m^{2}) operations building which includes an operations center, flight planning room, safety office, commander's office, and a weather room. Additionally, the airfield contains a 6,400-square-foot (590 m^{2}) maintenance hangar, crash rescue barn and NAVAIDS which include TVOR, NDB, VASI and REIL.

The airport is accessible by road from M-93 and BL I-75, and is close to M-72 and I-75.

The airport has a fixed-base operator that sells fuel and offers various facilities and amenities.

For the 12-month period ending December 29, 2019, the airport had 11,000 airport operations, an average of 30 per day. This includes 56% military and 44% general aviation. For the same time period, there were 9 aircraft based on the field, all single-engine airplanes.

== See also ==
- List of airports in Michigan
- Michigan World War II Army Airfields
