= Exercise Northern Strike =

Military exercise

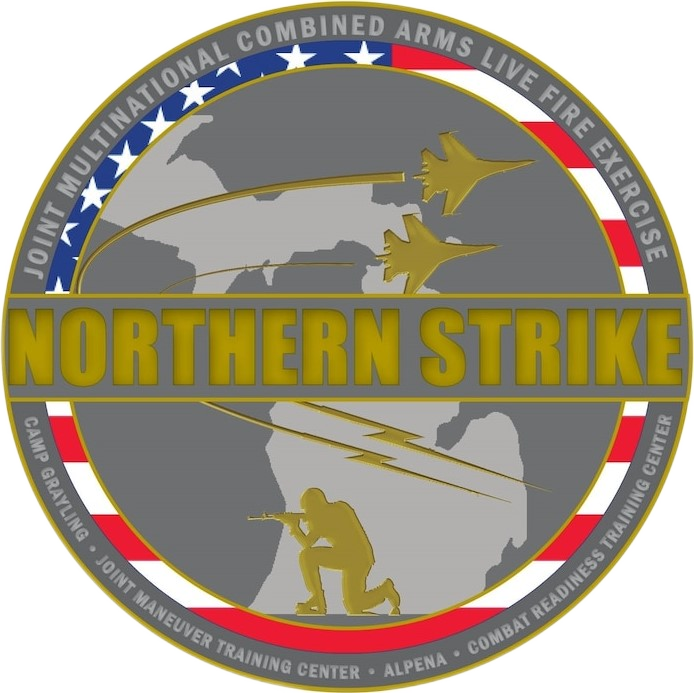
- Exercise Northern Strike logo (2018)

Exercise Northern Strike is a military readiness exercise hosted annually at Michigan National Guard facilities, including the Alpena CRTC, Camp Grayling Joint Maneuver Training Center, Grayling Aerial Gunnery Range, the Carmeuse Calcite Quarry in Rogers City, the former site of K.I. Sawyer Air Force Base as well as over the skies of northern Michigan and Lake Huron.

The air operations will take place at Alpena Combat Readiness Training Center (ACRTC) & use the Grayling Air Gunnery Range, while live-fire exercises involving small arms, mortars, artillery and aerial munitions will take place at the Camp Grayling range complex. Simulated-fire phases utilise the Carmeuse Calcite Quarry area during Exercise Northern Strike.

Northern Strike is one of the United States Department of Defense's largest annual joint, reserve component readiness exercise. The exercise is sponsored by the National Guard Bureau.

== History ==
Exercise Northern Strike began in 2011 with 500 participants engaged to over 6000 soldiers, airmen, sailors and marines taking part Northern Strike 2019. The three week exercise usually takes place in July or August each year.

Northern Strike's primary mission is (C.A.S.) close air support, with secondary missions including air interdiction, airlift and airdrop, combat search and rescue, air-to-air refueling and intelligence, and both air and ground surveillance and reconnaissance.

In January 2020, an additional arctic weather training exercise called Winter Strike was introduced. The first exercise lasted seven days, but the January session was expanded to ten days in subsequent years.

== Aerial Phase ==
Alpena CRTC is the focal point of air operations during Northern Strike. Fixed wing aircraft that frequently participate include the A-10 Thunderbolt II, F-16C Fighting Falcon, C-130 Hercules, MQ-9 Reaper, KC-135 Stratotanker, E-8C Joint STARS, F-18E/F, and EA-18. Rotary wing participates, including the UH-60 Blackhawk, AH-64 Apache, AH-1W Super Cobra, CH-47 Chinook, and the UH-1Y Venom/Super Huey.

Live and inert ordnance is expended on the Grayling Air Gunnery Range during the exercise. Rockets, aircraft cannon fire, live guided/unguided bombs up to 500lb and 2000lb inert bombs in size can be used on the range.

For 2021, A-10 Thunderbolt IIs from the 354th Fighter Squadron and the Michigan Air National Guard's 127th Wing along with two C-146A Wolfhounds from the Air Force Special Operations Command participated in the exercise. The aircraft landed on state highway M-32 as part of Northern Strike 21, a large-scale training exercise, in Alpena, Michigan. This was the first ever use of a Highway strip on US soil.

== Ground Phase ==
The majority of the ground phase of Exercise Northern Strike takes place on the 147,000 acres of the Camp Grayling Joint Maneuver Training Center, the largest National Guard training center in the country. Camp Grayling is the largest open airspace for training east of the Mississippi River.

2016 saw the start of a major amphibious landing exercise being added to Northern Strike conducted by United States Marine Corps Forces on Lake Margrethe at Camp Grayling.

Northern Strike 2017 saw more than 30 Joint Terminal Attack Controllers (JTACs) from around the globe take part. JTACs use specialized equipment to direct combat aircraft engaged in close air support and other offensive air operations from a forward observation position. Sometimes JTACs direct defensive air power for rescue evacuations. They are also called Forward Air Controllers (FACs) and usually work with Joint Fires Observers (JFOs) who assist with tracking and location identification.

On July 18, 2019, during Northern Strike 2019 saw the first time a remotely-piloted MQ-9 Reaper took off and landed in Michigan airspace. The MQ-9 "Reaper" from the 214th Attack Group, Arizona Air National Guard was operating from the Alpena Combat Readiness Training Center. MQ-9 "Reapers" used in previous Northern Strike exercises had been flown from their home base.

Greater emphasis has been put on medical and aeromedical procedures in recent Northern Strike. This includes setting up a mobile patient staging area from the ground up, loading, unloading and in-flight care of patients. Combat Search and Rescue and the treatment of injured aircrew is regularly practiced during Northern Strike exercises. Patient resuscitation is a key skill practiced by personnel while attending Northern Strike.

== International Participants ==
Troops from the United Kingdom, Bulgaria, Estonia, Jordan, Canada, Denmark, Lithuania, The Netherlands, Germany, Hungary, Poland, Latvia, and the Republic of China (Taiwan) have participated in previous Northern Strike exercises.

== Gallery ==
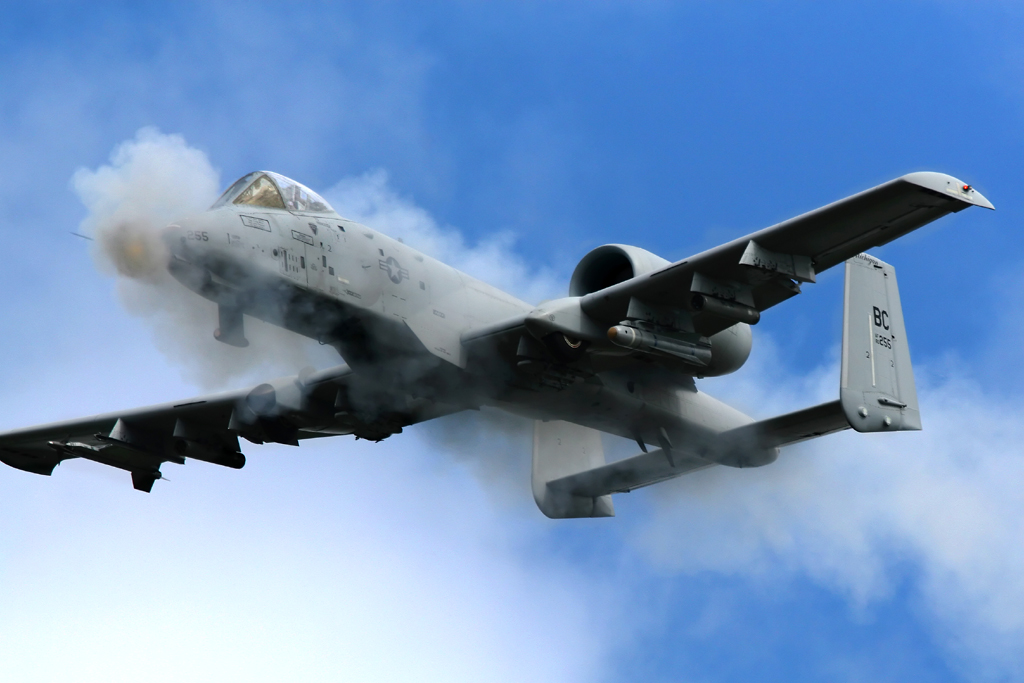
A-10 strafes a target at the Grayling Air Gunnery Range

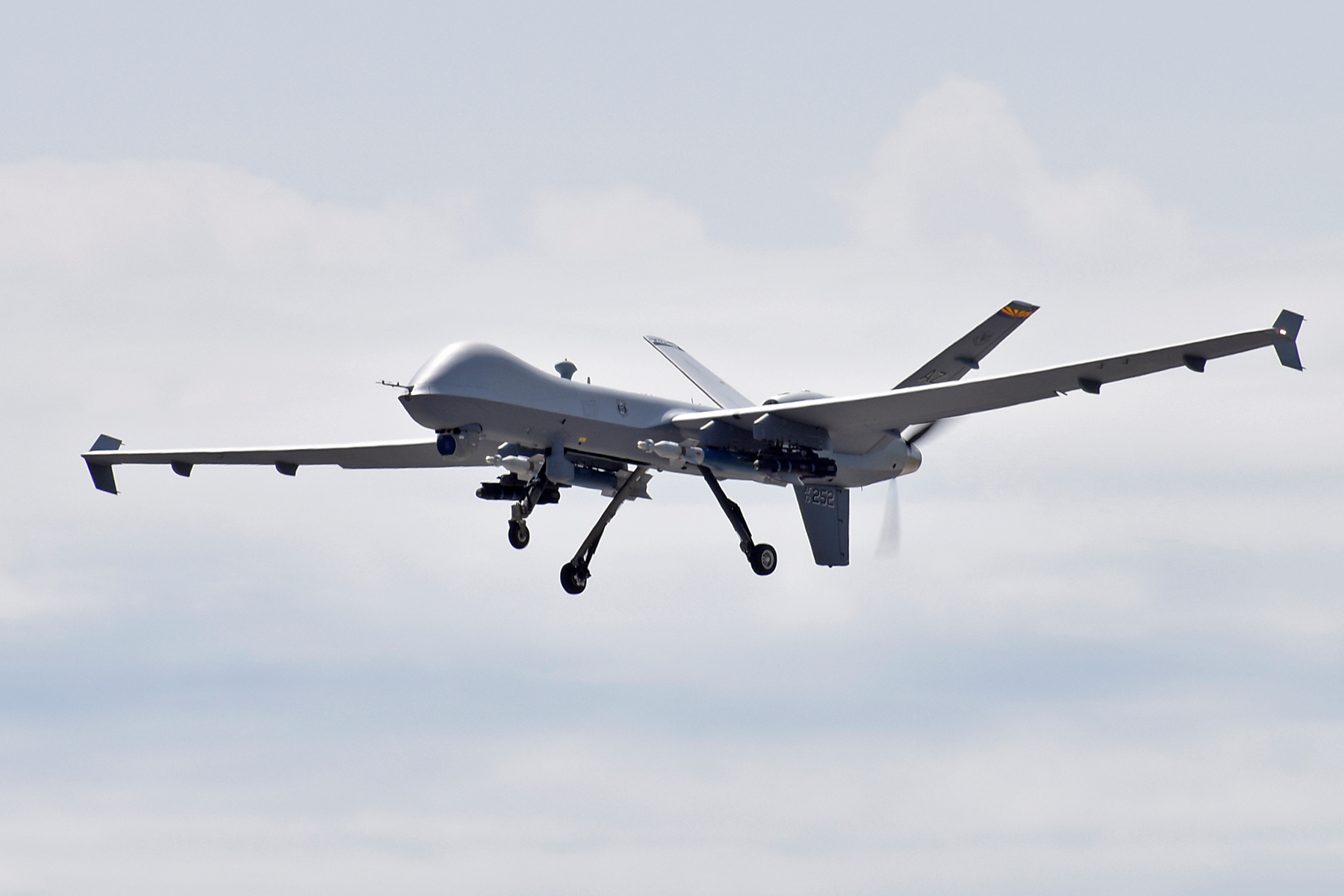
MQ-9 Reaper during Exercise Northern Strike 2019

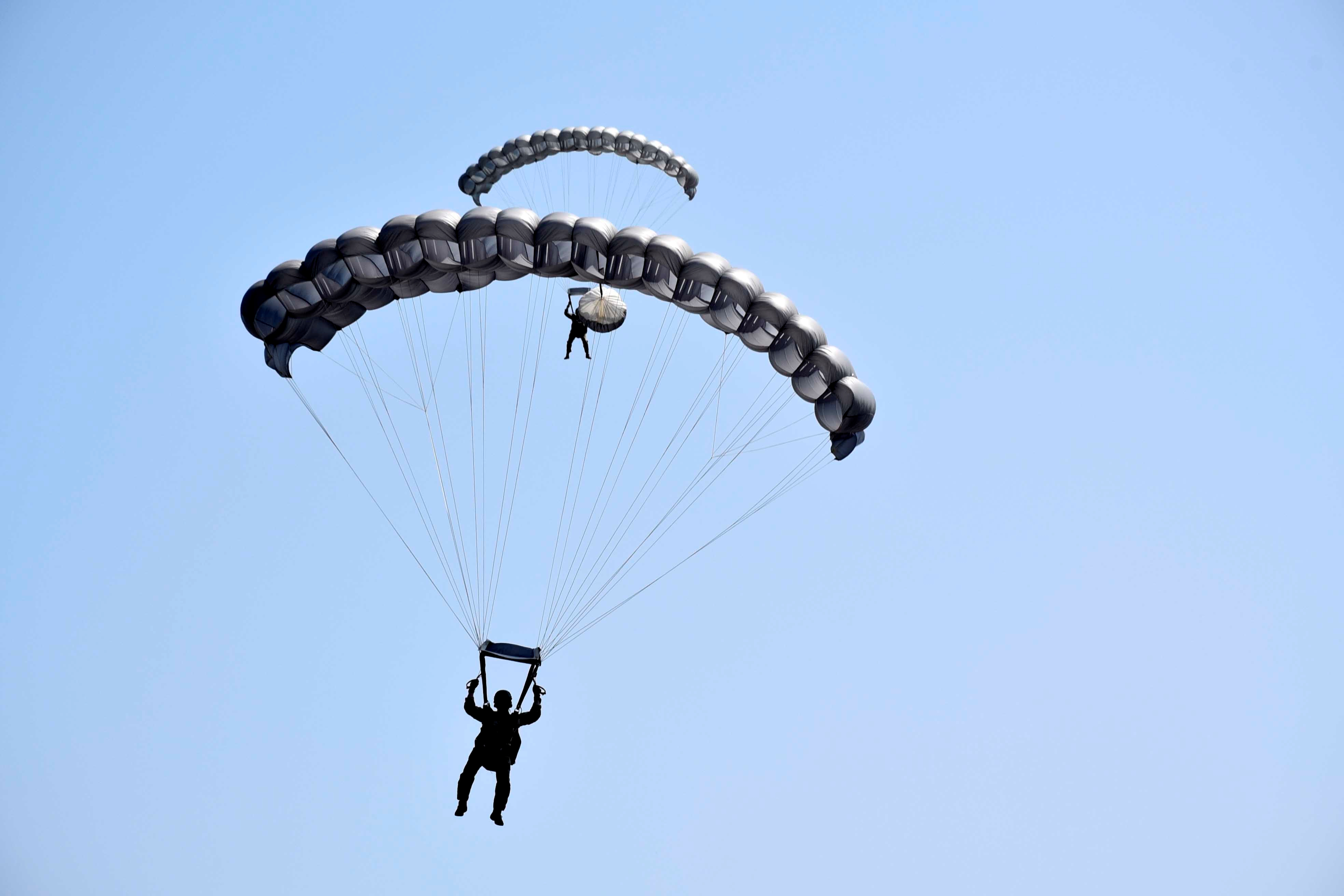
Pararescuemen from the 103rd RS, Westhampton Beach, NY, parachute into Carmeuse Calcite Quarry (Ex. Northern Strike 2018)

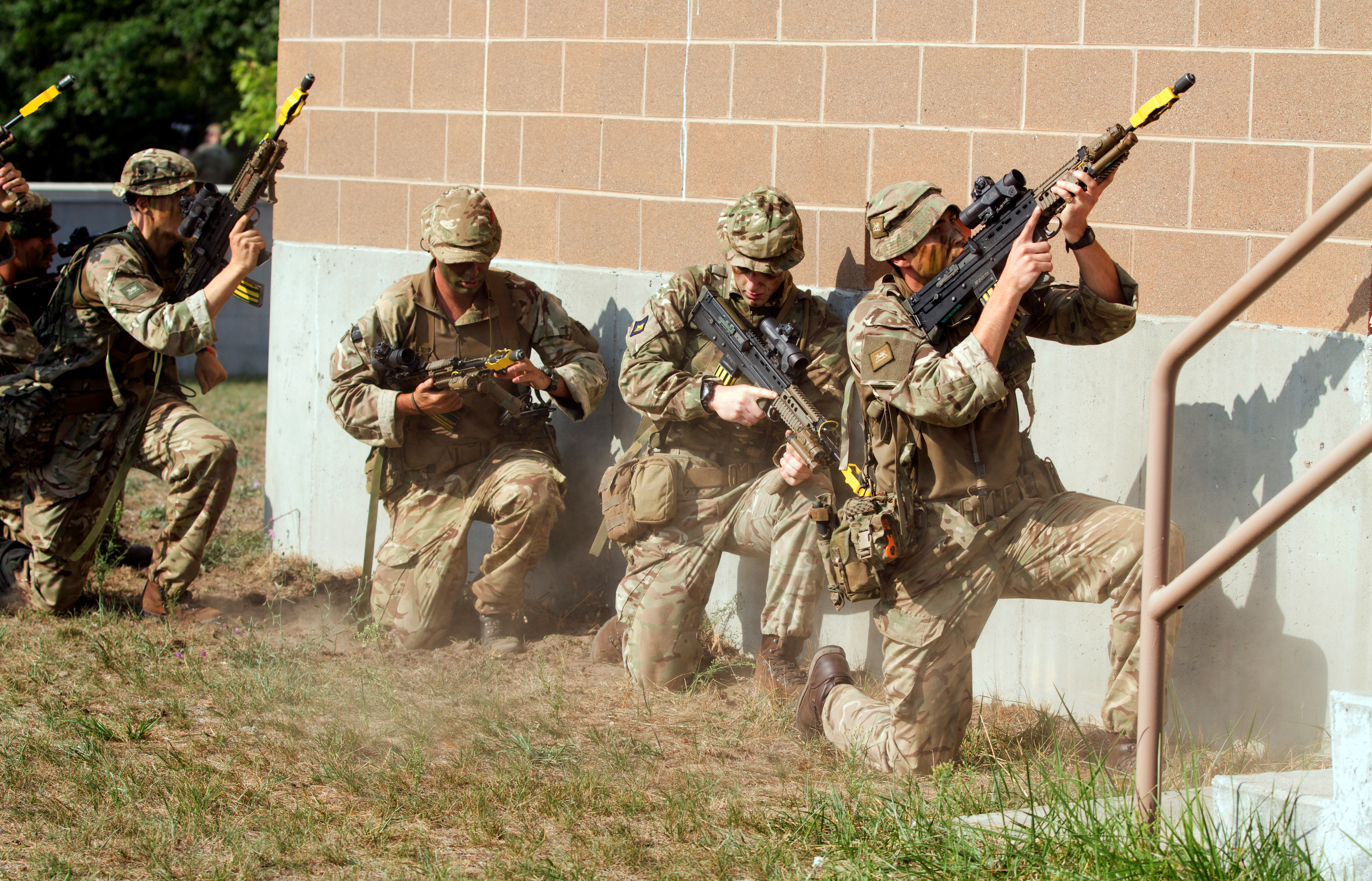
Troops from 3rd battalion, Princess of Wales Royal Regiment practice breach and clear operations at Camp Grayling Joint Maneuver Training

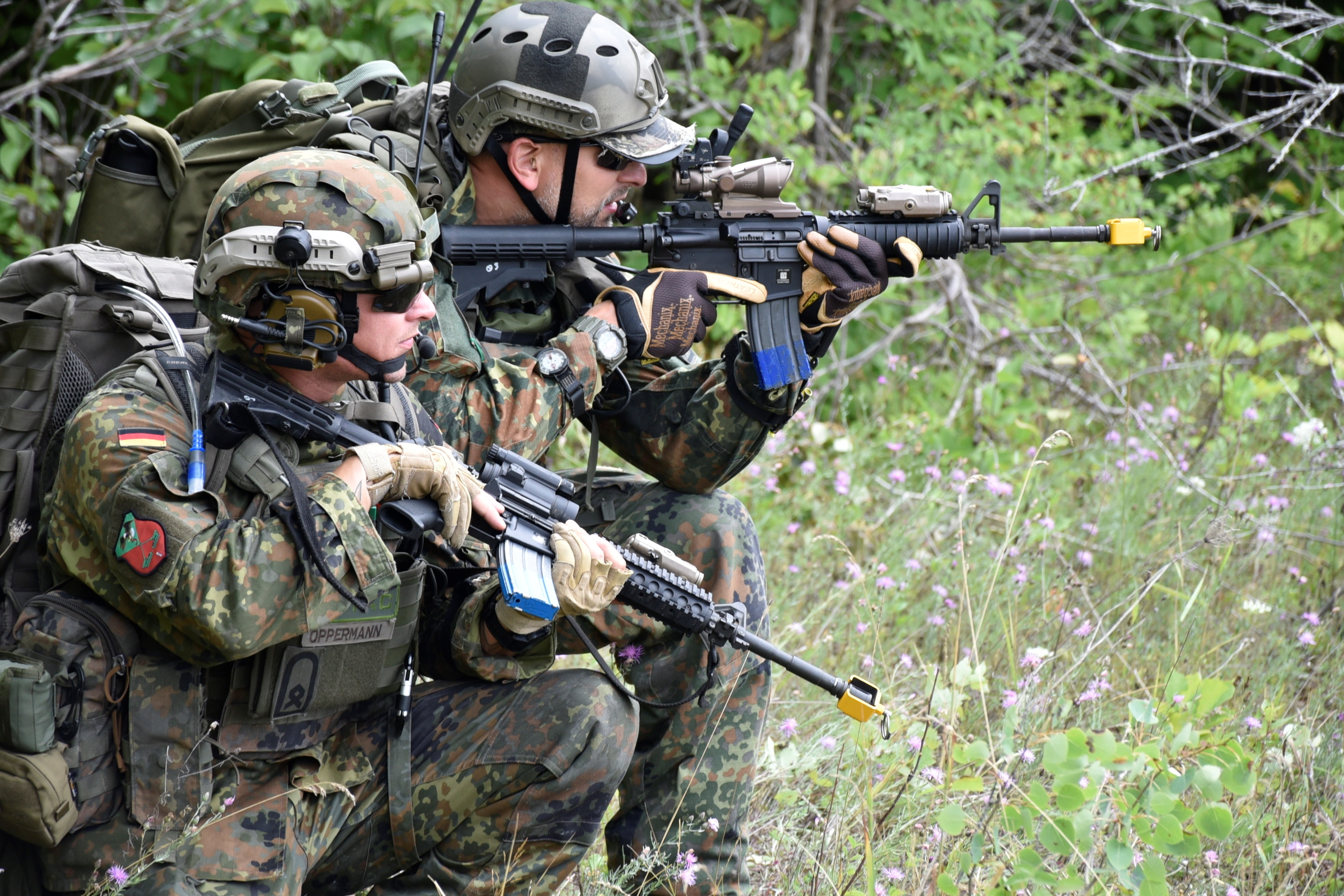
German Joint Terminal Attack Controllers during Exercise Northern Strike 2018

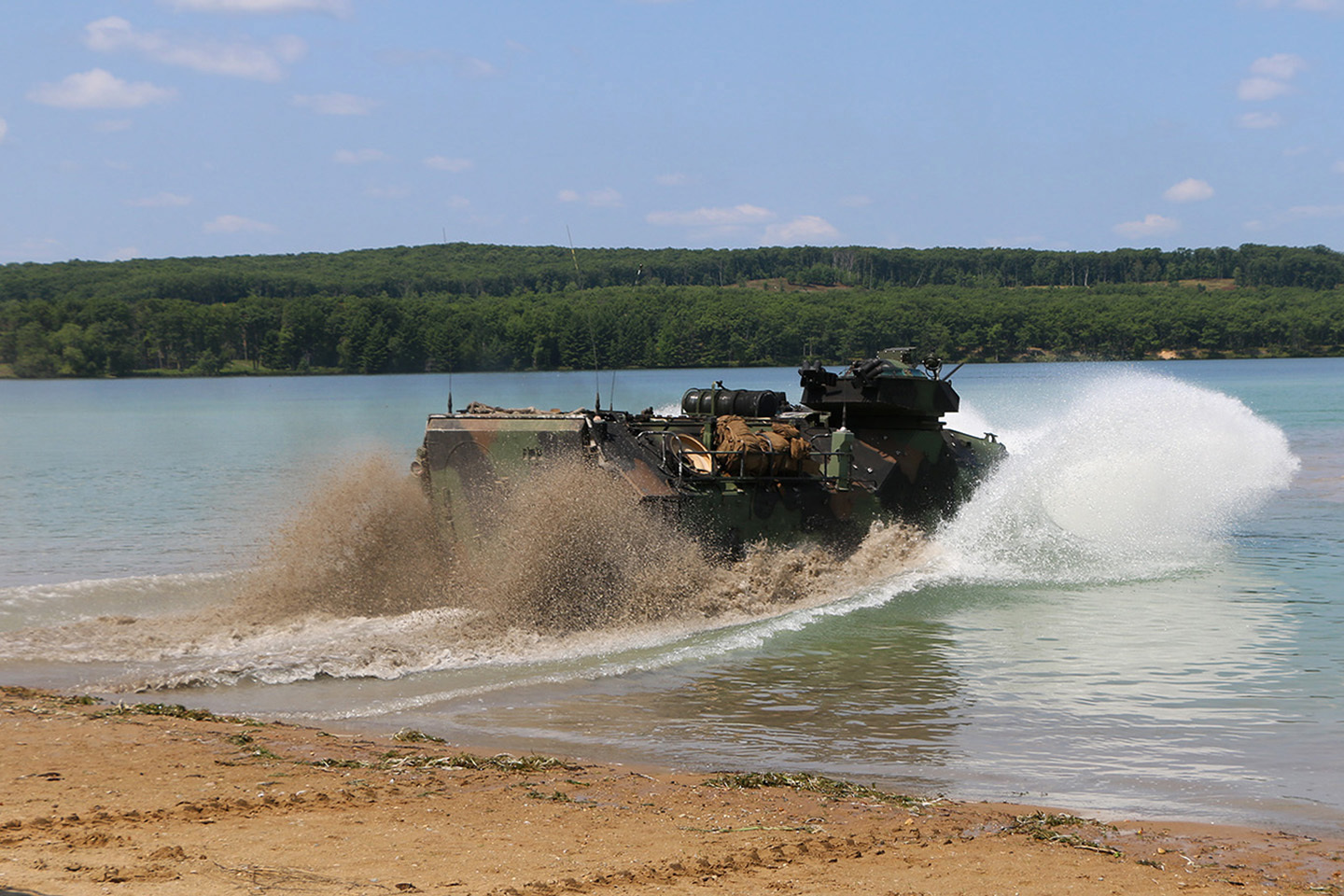
Marines from Company A, 4th Assault Amphibian Battalion, 4th Marine Division U.S.M.C. Forces Reserve at Lake Margrethe, Camp Grayling, Michigan during Exercise Northern Strike 2018

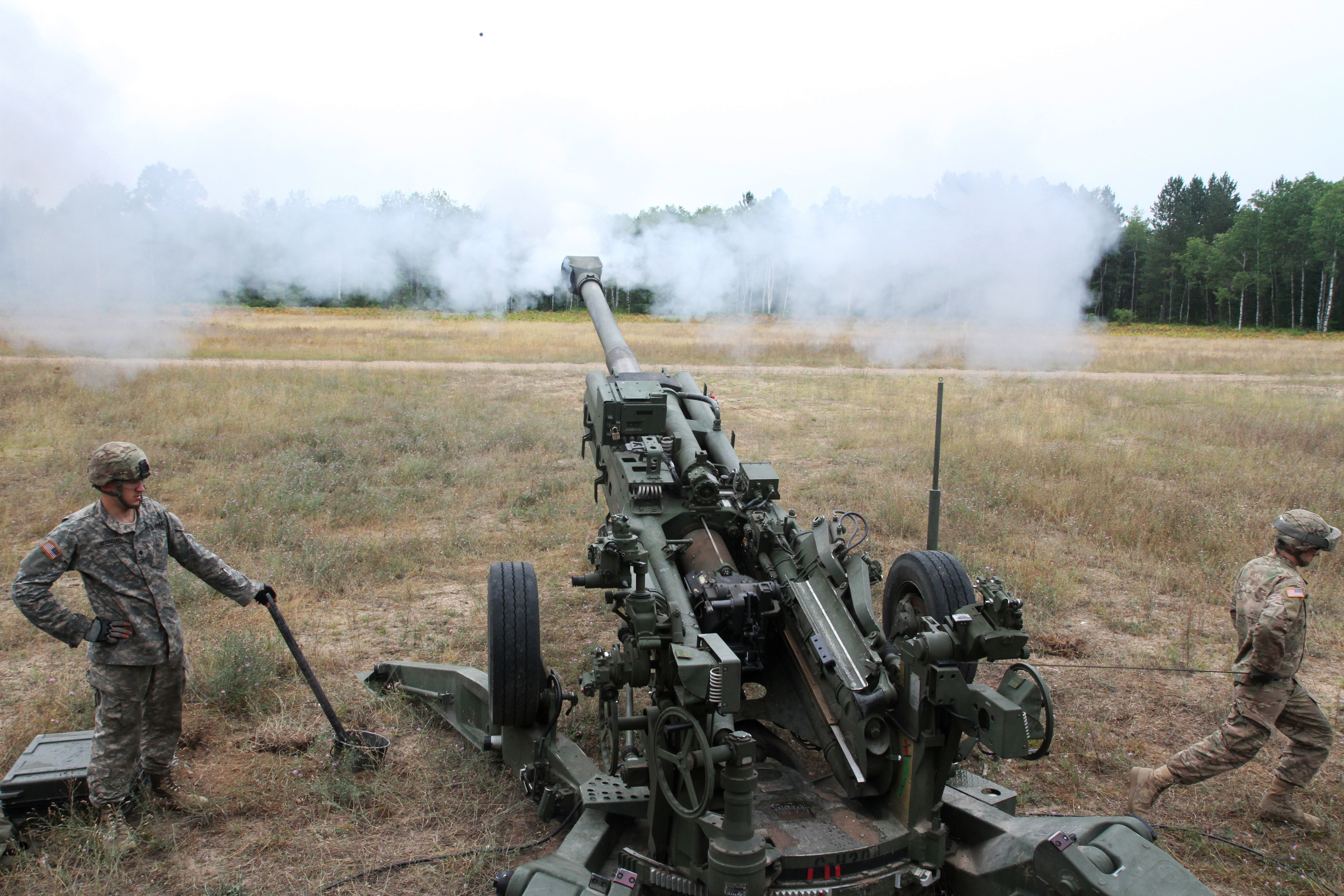
Michigan ANG soldiers fire a 155 mm M777 Howitzer, at the Camp Grayling Joint Maneuver Training Center during Exercise Northern Strike 2016

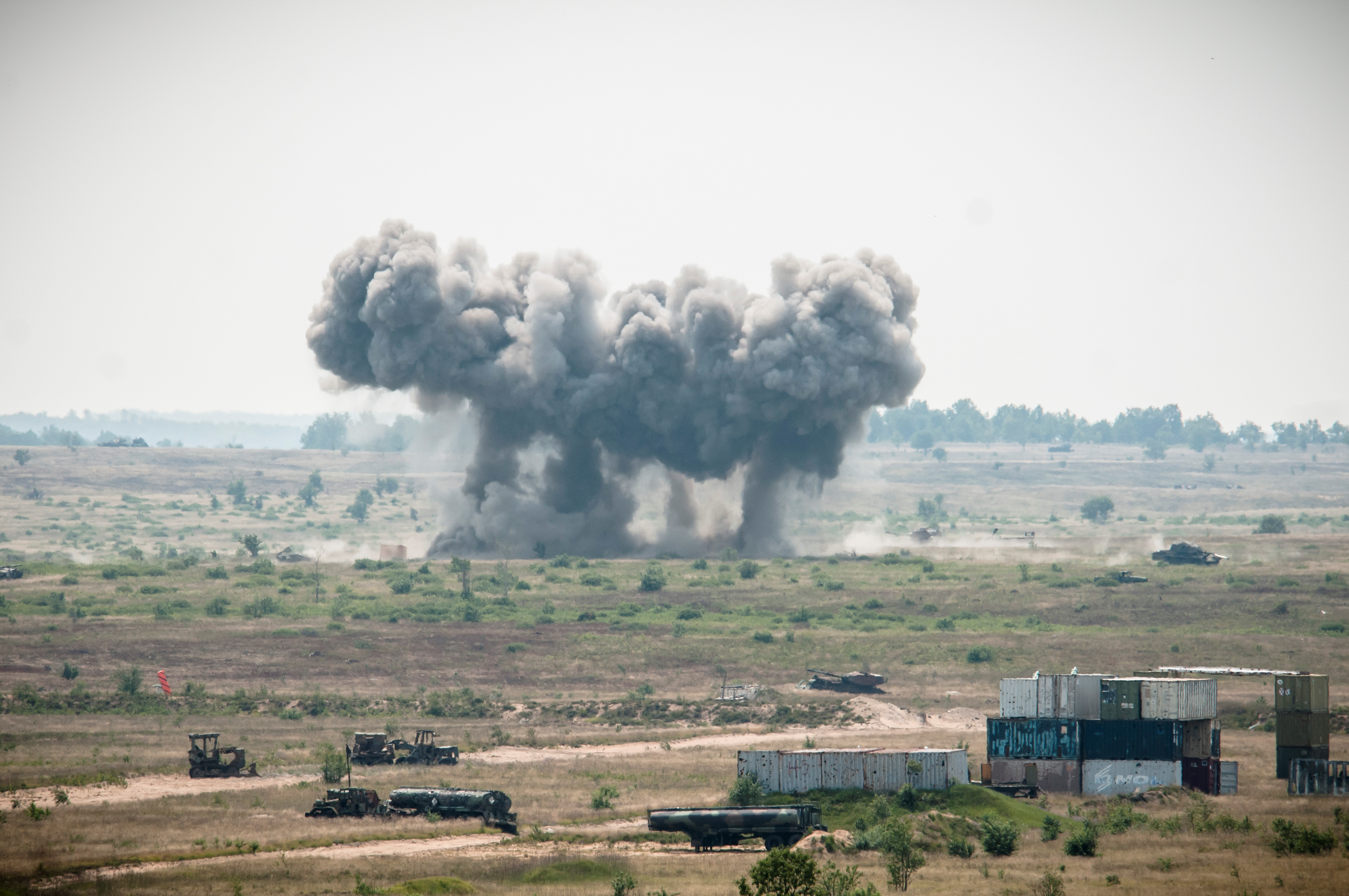
A-10 Thunderbolt II drops live Mk 82, 500lb bombs on the Grayling Aerial Gunnery Range during Exercise Northern Strike 2014

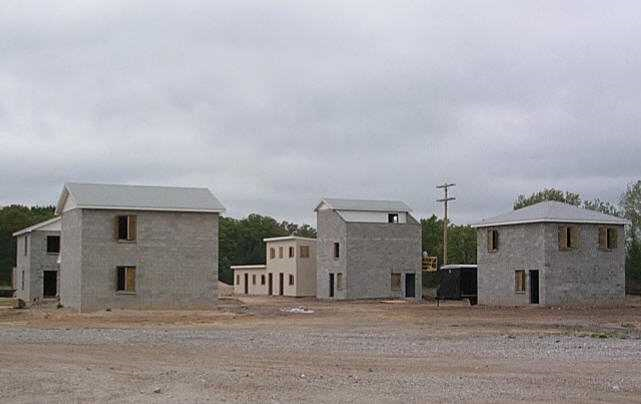
The Alpena CRTC MOUT (Military Operations in Urban Terrain) Area

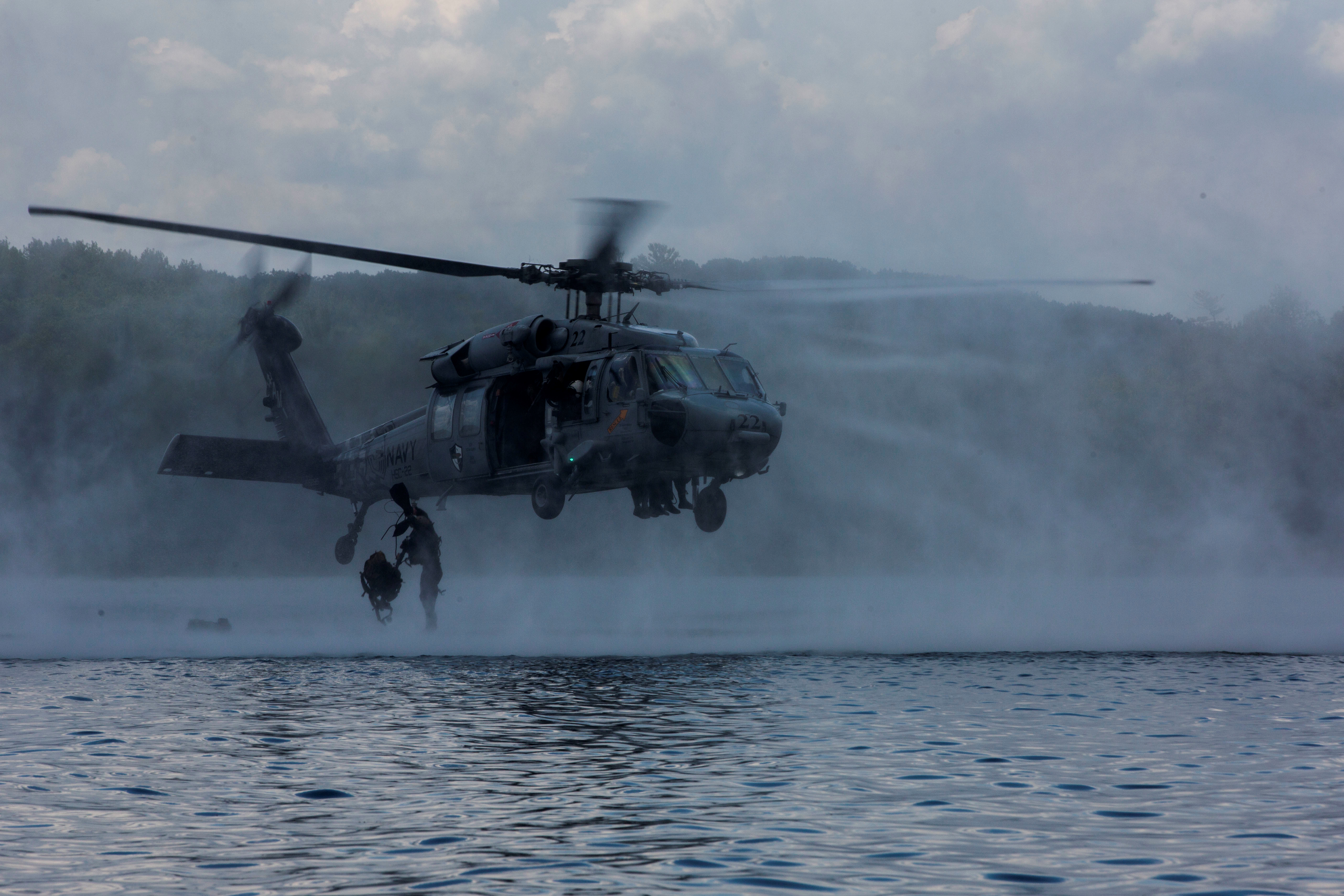
U.S. Marines from Echo Company, 4th Reconnaissance Battalion, 4th Marine Division, Marine Forces Reserve, Helocast into Lake Margrethe, Exercise Northern Strike 2017

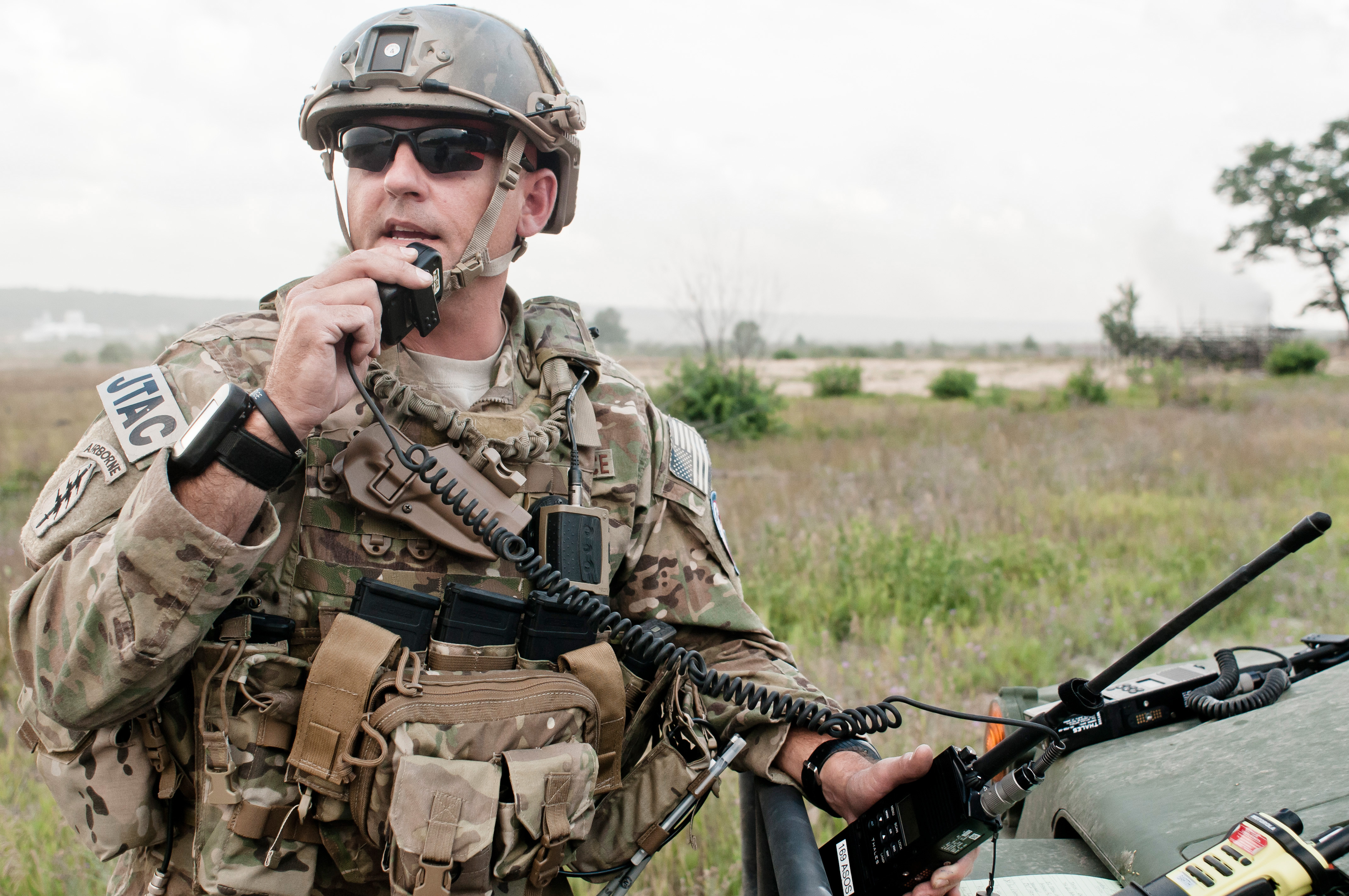
182nd Air Support Operations Group pictured during Exercise Northern Strike 2013

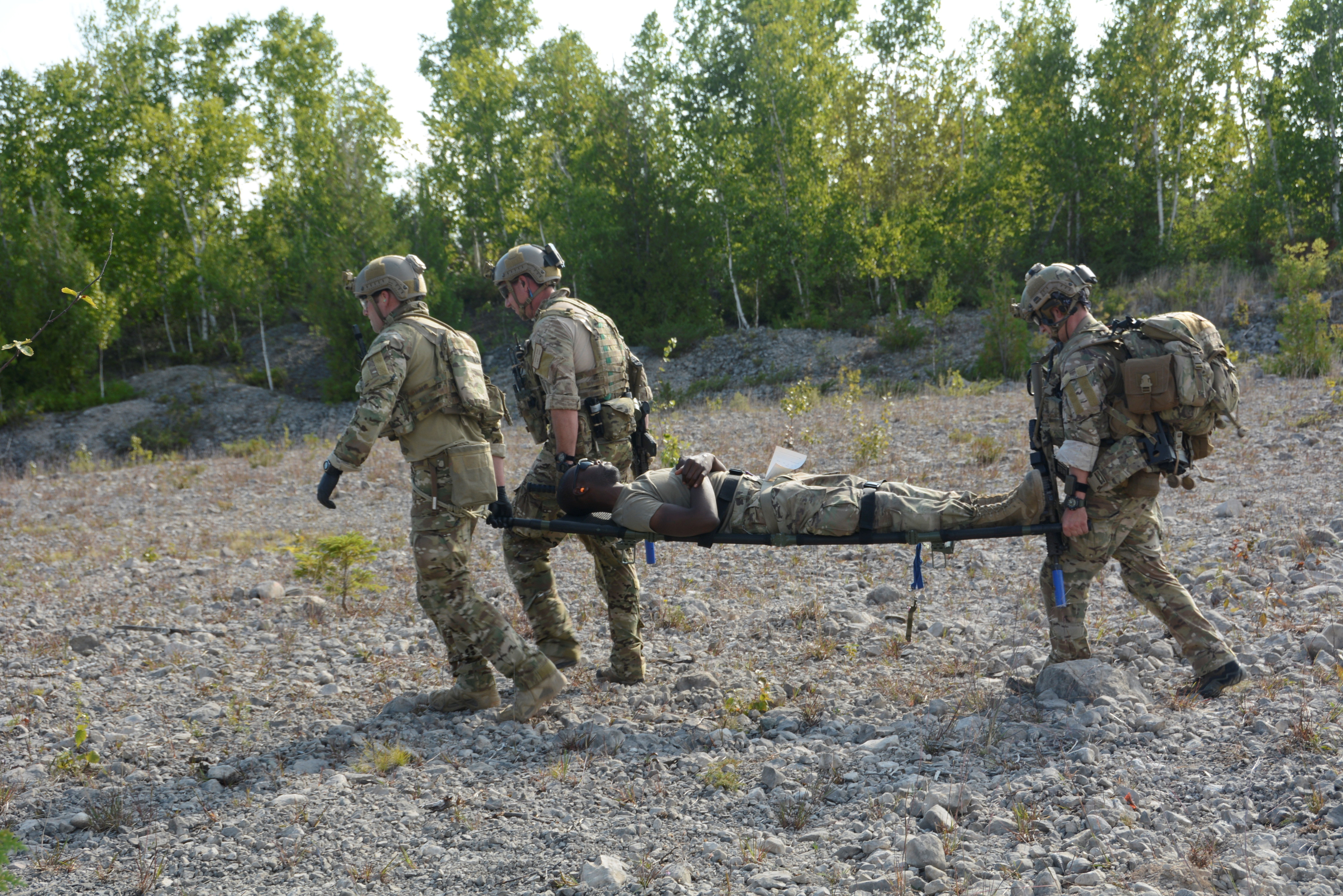
Pararescue specialists from the 103d Rescue Squadron, NY, evacuate a casualty during a Combat Search & Rescue exercise at Northern Strike 2018

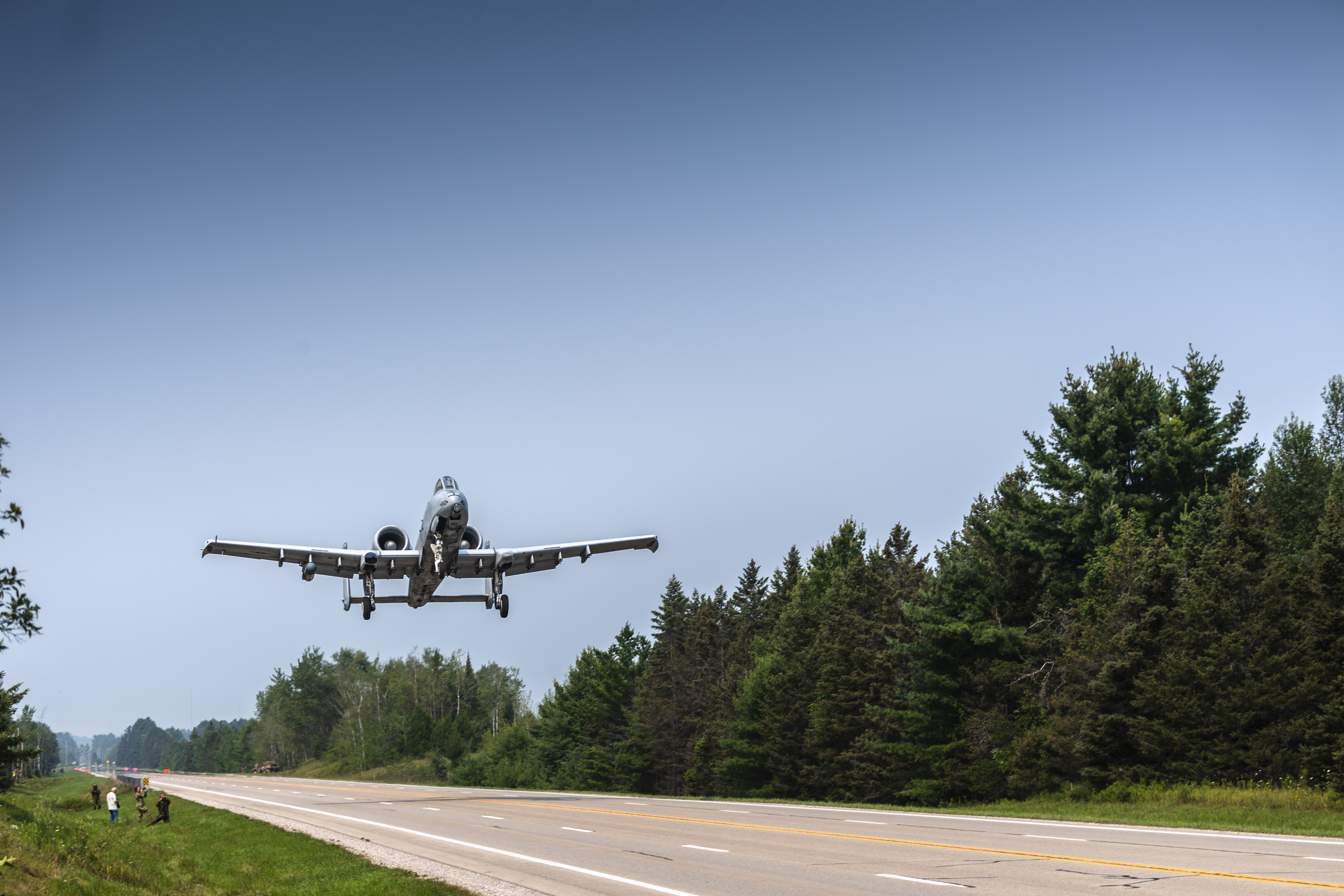
An A-10 Thunderbolt II from Davis-Monthan Air Force Base, Arizona, takes off on a public highway in Alpena, Michigan, August 5, 2021

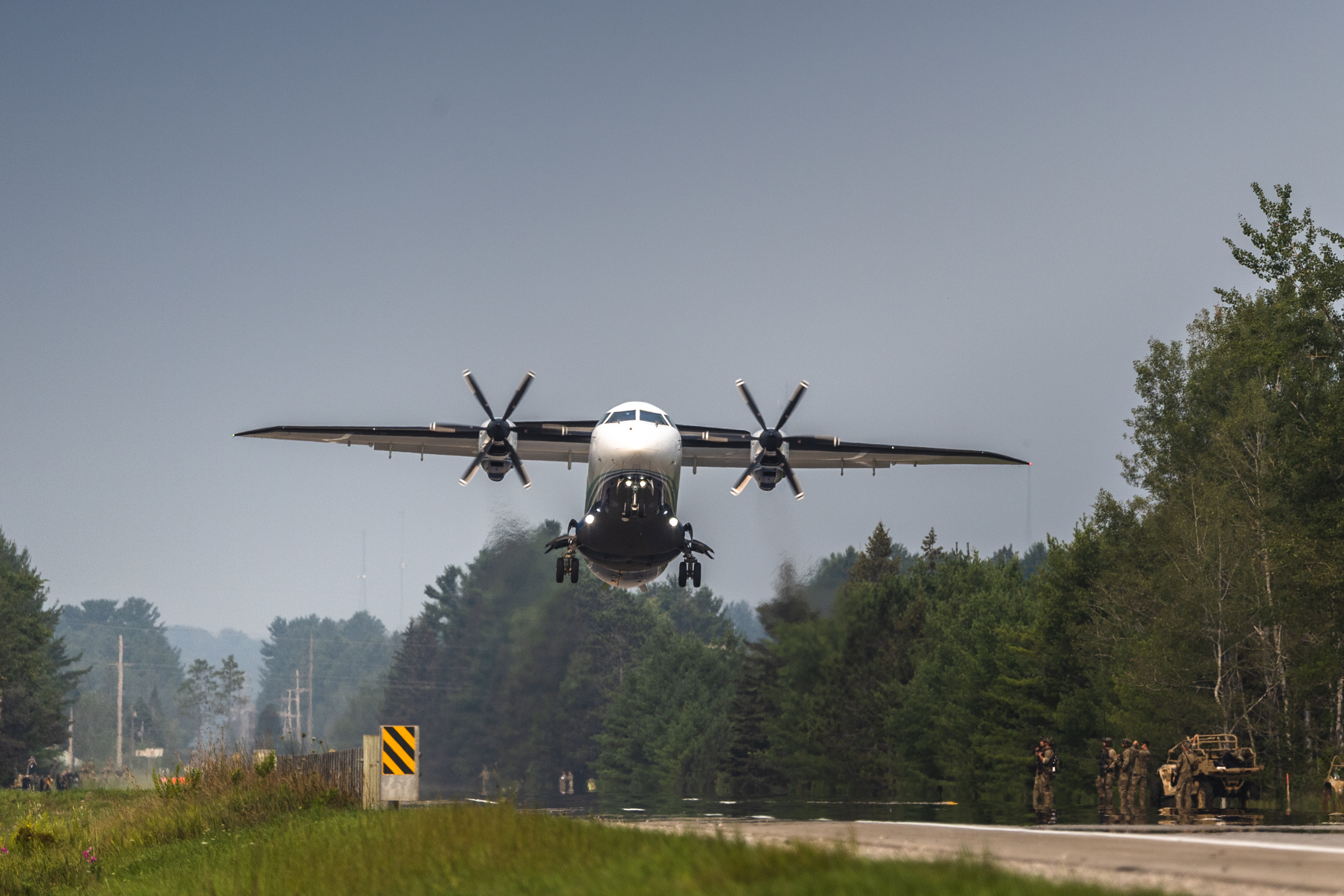
C-146A Wolfhound from Hurlburt Field, Florida, takes off on a public highway in Alpena, Michigan, August 5, 2021

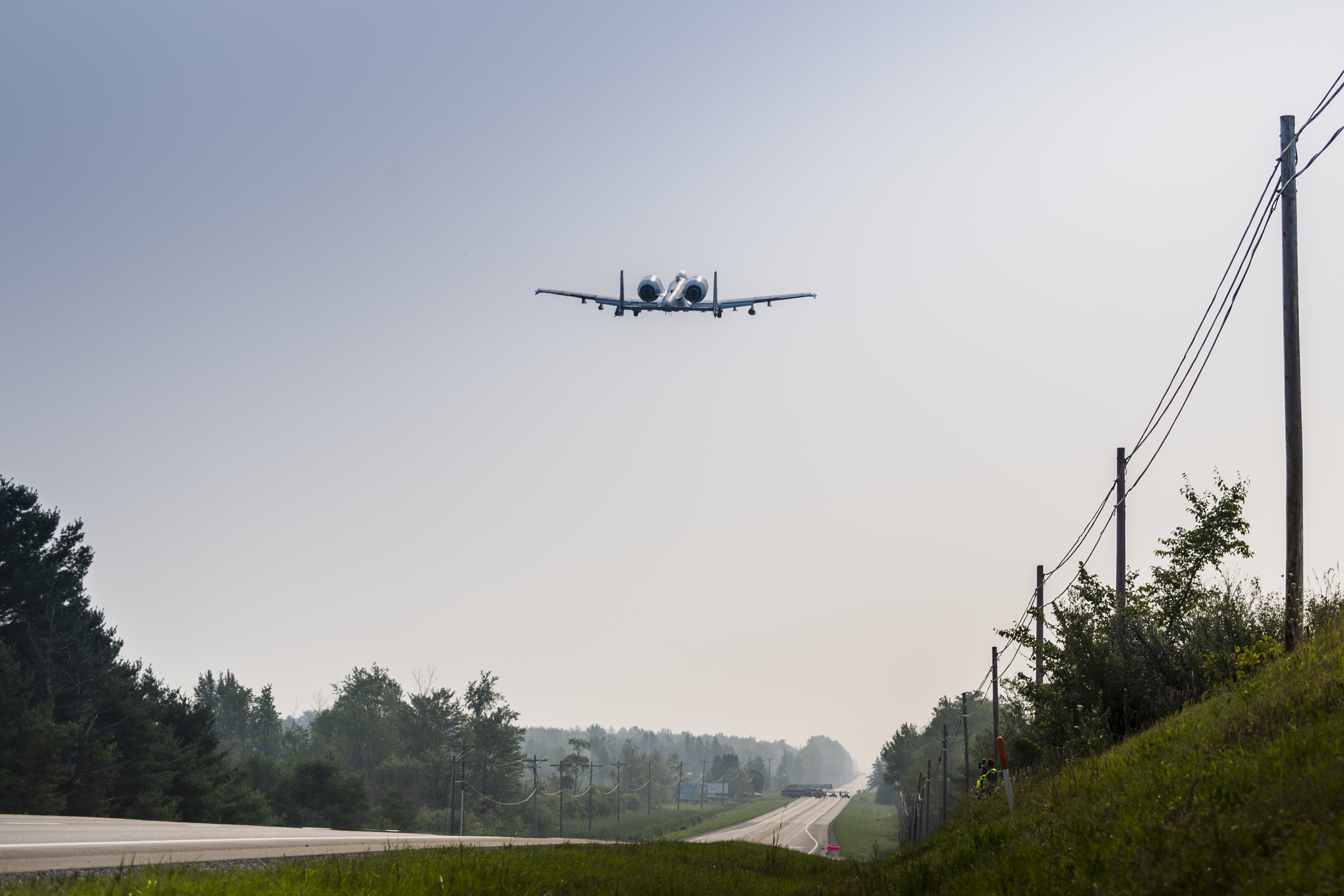
An A-10 Thunderbolt II from Selfridge Air National Guard Base, Michigan, flying over a public highway in Alpena, Michigan, August 5, 2021

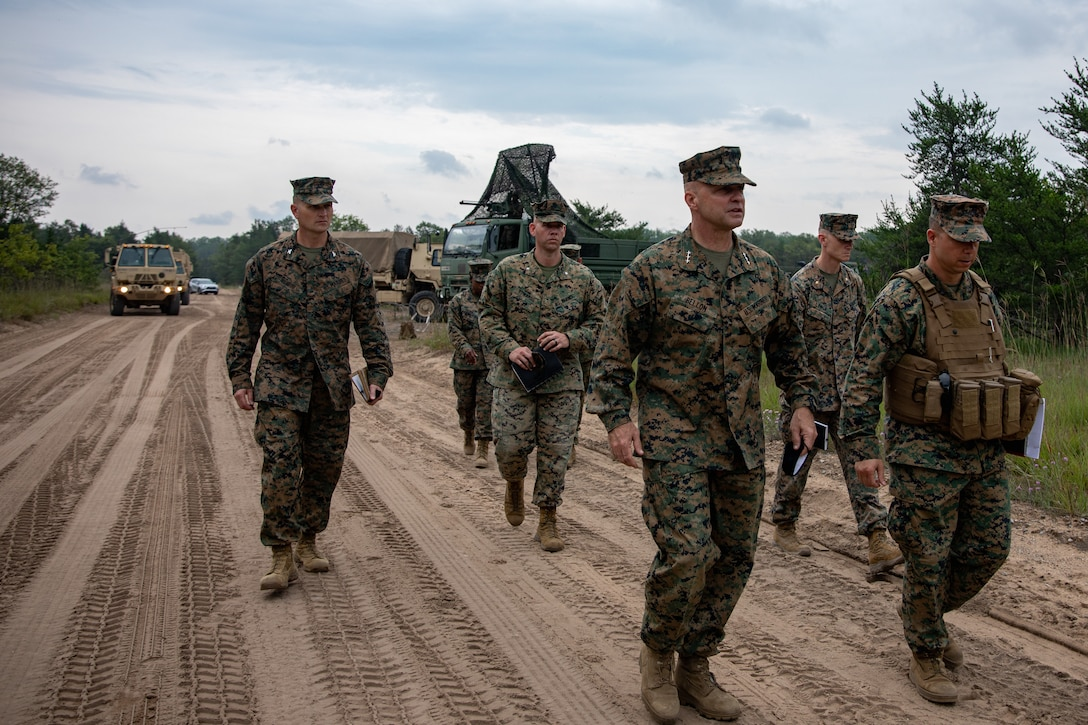
Marine Reserve at Exercise Northern Strike 21-2
