= M-93 (Michigan highway) =

State highway in Crawford County, Michigan, United States

M-93
- M-93 highlighted in red

Route information
- Maintained by MDOT
- Length: 11.810 mi (19.006 km)
- Existed: c. July 1, 1919–present

Major junctions
- South end: Main Gate, Camp Grayling
- M-72 in Grayling; I-75 / BL I-75 near Grayling
- North end: Hartwick Pines State Park

Location
- Country: United States
- State: Michigan
- Counties: Crawford

Highway system
- Michigan State Trunkline Highway System; Interstate; US; State; Byways
← M-92	→ I-94

M-93 is the designation of a state trunkline highway in the Lower Peninsula of the US state of Michigan. It links both Camp Grayling and Hartwick Pines State Park with Interstate 75 (I-75). Both termini of M-93 end at locations, rather than junctions with another road. The western end of M-93 ends in a traffic circle before it turns into Howe Road as it travels through Camp Grayling. The highway dates back to 1919 as a connection with the predecessor to Camp Grayling. Since that time, it has been extended through Grayling along first US Highway 27 (US 27) and now Business Loop I-75 (BL 75) to connect with the state park.

== Route description ==
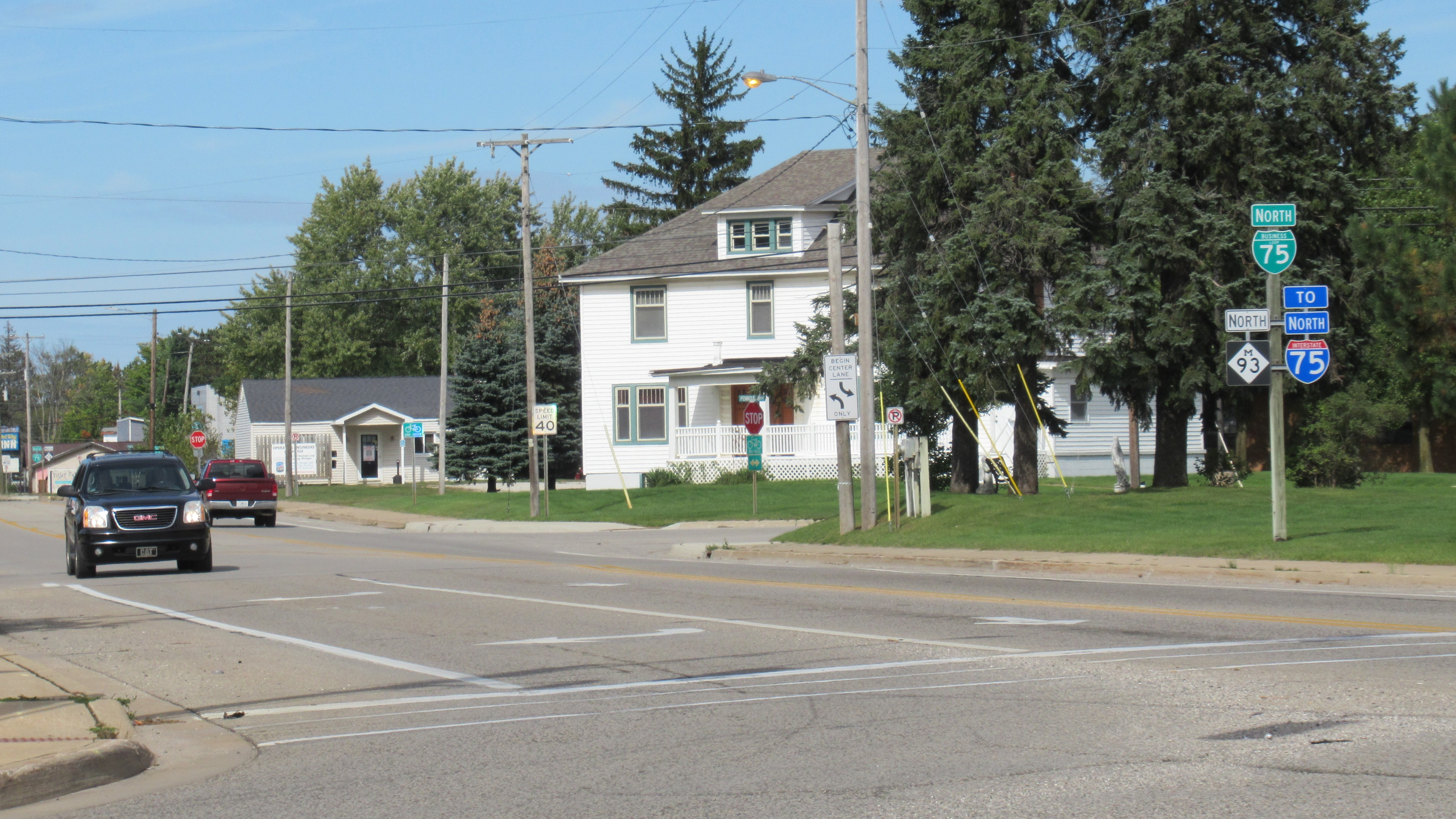
M-93 running concurrently with BL I-75 in Grayling

M-93 starts at the main gate of Camp Grayling. From there it runs north and east along Sharon Road parallel to the shore of Lake Margarethe through the edge of the base complex. The highway continues through forested terrain to a junction with M-72 west of the city of Grayling. M-93 turns east, running concurrently along M-72 into town. As the highway approaches downtown, the landscape becomes more urbanized after crossing the Au Sable River. In Grayling, M-93 turns north along the former route of US 27, which is now BL I-75. M-72 turns south with BL I-75 along James Street, ending the M-72/M-93 concurrency.

The roadway runs north through town passing the Grayling Army Airfield, and BL I-75/M-93 becomes Grayling Highway. Together they make a right turn onto Hartwick Pines Road when they intersect Old 27 Road, turning back towards I-75; this area is part of the Grayling State Forest. The BL I-75 designation ends at I-75 while M-93 continues along Hartwick Pines Road. The M-93 designation ends at the park's former main gate. The roadway continues further into Hartwick Pines State Park as White Road, a rural road that intersects unsigned route County Road 612 north of the park boundaries.

== History ==
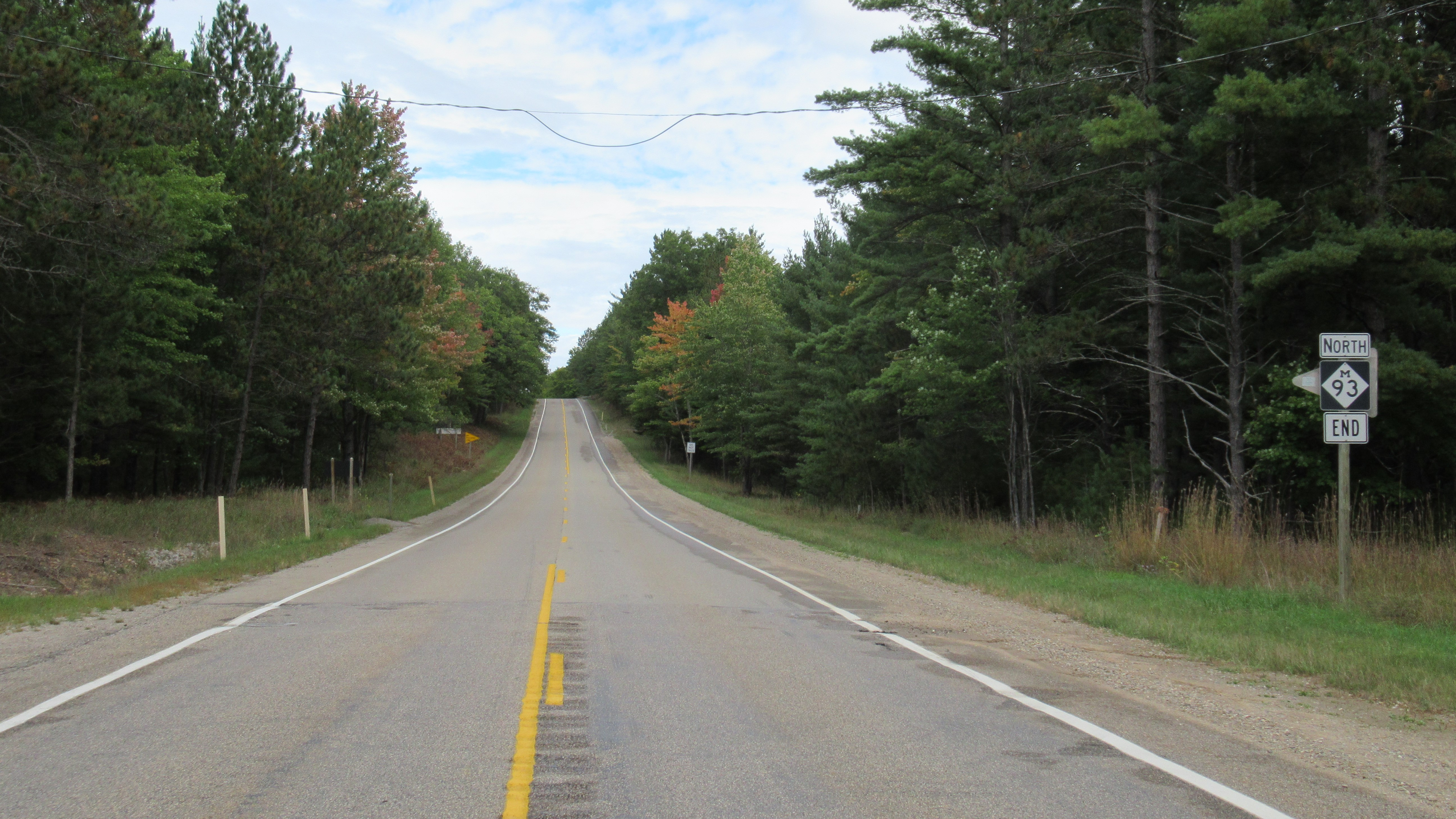
Northern terminus of M-93 in Hartwick Pines State Park

On July 1, 1919, M-93 was a spur routing from M-18 to the "State Military Camp", what is now Camp Grayling. The designation was extended in 1929 along North Down River Road, and several back roads to Bob Cat Trail and Hartwick Pines State Park. A new routing was completed in 1932 north of downtown Grayling to the park. The highway extended north of the park to County Road 612 east of Frederick at this time as well. When I-75 was completed in the area in 1963, the US 27 designation was dropped, and BL I-75 was designated through town in its place. The northern end was truncated to the state park in 1968. When the park's entrance was moved in the early 1990s, the highway designation was not truncated again, and MDOT still maintains M-93 to the former park entrance at Bob Cat Trail.

== Major intersections ==
The entire highway is in Crawford County.

Location	mi	km	Destinations	Notes
Camp Grayling	0.000	0.000	Main Gate	
Grayling	2.950	4.748	M-72 west – Kalkaska, Traverse City	Western end of M-72 concurrency
Grayling	4.337	6.980	BL I-75 north M-72 east – Mio, Harrisville	Southern end of BL I-75 concurrency along Old US 27; eastern end of M-72 concurrency
Grayling	4.792	7.712	F-32 east (North Down River Road)	Western terminus of F-32
Grayling Township	6.915	11.129	Old 27 Road	Formerly US 27
Grayling Township	8.654	13.927	I-75 – Mackinac Bridge, Saginaw BL I-75 south	BL I-75 concurrency ends at I-75 exit 259
Hartwick Pines State Park	11.810	19.006	Bob Cat Trail	Northern terminus at former park main gate
1.000 mi = 1.609 km; 1.000 km = 0.621 mi: Concurrency terminus
