= Bear Archery =

American manufacturer and marketer of bows

- Industry: Sports equipment; Hunting equipment
- Founder: Fred Bear; Charles Piper
- Headquarters: Gainsville, Florida
- Products: Compound bow; Recurve bow; Longbow
- Website: beararchery.com

Bear Archery is a manufacturer and marketer of bows and archery equipment located in Gainesville, Florida, owned by Escalade Sports.

== History ==
The company was founded in 1933 as the Bear Products Company in Detroit, Michigan by Fred Bear and Charles Piper. The initial focus was on silk-screening and advertising support work for automotive companies.

In 1938 Fred Bear hired Nels Grumley, a woodworker and bowyer, and the company expanded to offer hand-made bows.

Fred Bear sold the advertising side of the Bear Products Company in 1940. The archery business was named Bear Archery.

In 1947 the company moved to a new facility in Grayling, Michigan. The Grayling plant focused on making and marketing recurve bows and longbows in a growing archery market. Bow manufacturing changed from hand-made bows to mass production using fiberglass and other modern materials.

Fred Bear sold the company to Victor Comptometer in 1968, but remained the president of Bear Archery. The company was not one of the first compound bow manufacturers, but eventually found success with early models like the Whitetail Hunter. Bear Archery moved manufacturing from Michigan to Gainesville, Florida in 1978.

Over the next three decades Bear Archery changed hands in a series of mergers, acquisitions, and spin-offs from Victor Comptometer to Walter Kidde & Co, Hanson PLC, U.S. Industries, Fenway Partners and the North American Archery Group. All Bear archery products are being produced in Gainesville, Florida.

In 2003 Escalade Sports acquired the North American Archery Group and currently does business as Bear Archery Inc.
