= Fred Bear =

American bow hunter (1902–1988)

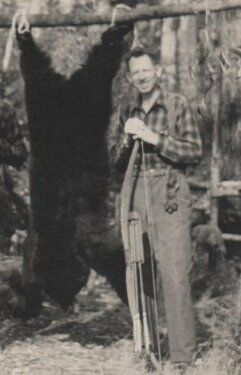
- Bear in 1946
- Born: March 5, 1902; Waynesboro, Pennsylvania, U.S.
- Died: April 27, 1988 (aged 86); Gainesville, Florida, U.S.
- Occupations: Bow hunter, bowyer

Fred Bear (March 5, 1902 – April 27, 1988) was an American bow hunter and manufacturer. Although he did not start bow hunting until he was 29 and did not master the skill for many years, he is widely regarded as a pioneer in the bow hunting community. Bear was a world traveler, film producer, and the founder of Bear Archery. He died in Gainesville, Florida and is inducted in the Bowhunters Hall of Fame.

== Career ==
Bear was born in a farmhouse in Franklin County, Pennsylvania on March 5, 1902, the second of three children. His heritage was English, Dutch, Swiss and German.

Early on, Bear worked as a glue maker for the Chrysler Company in Detroit. He also worked for the Ford Motor Company in Detroit as a wood carver, making cabinets for the radios/dashboards. In an interview, he mentioned operating a plant from 1929 to 1933, during the Great Depression, that caught fire, thus rendering him unemployed. With a partner named Chuck who had worked at the same plant, they put together $1,200 to open his bow business in a garage. Bear Archery was thus founded in 1933.

In 1947, Bear and his wife moved to Grayling, Michigan, where they lived in a tent along a river to keep their personal expenses down while trying to make a go of their bow business. Even as late as 1961, it was difficult making ends meet for Bear. The following years proved prosperous however, as more states permitted bow hunting and the sport's growth steadily increased.

Bear's interest in bowhunting was stimulated by another legend, Art Young of the Pope and Young Club, whom Bear met in Michigan in the late 1920s and often called his hero. Bear's first bowhunting trophy was a Michigan whitetail taken in 1935. In the ensuing years, he traveled the world with his bow and appeared before thousands of bowhunters promoting and teaching the sport. His television debut was made on Arthur Godfrey and His Friends, with later appearances on The American Sportsman and The Tonight Show. He also produced several films of bowhunting around the world and was a popular contributing author for magazines such as Outdoor Life and Archery Magazine.

Bear sold controlling interest in his company in 1968, but continued on with the title of chairman. In 1978, following a strike and continuing labor problems, the Bear Archery manufacturing operation was relocated to Gainesville, Florida.

== Death ==
Bear struggled with chronic emphysema later on in life, and suffered a heart attack while living in Florida and was admitted to a hospital in Gainesville. He remained in the hospital for a month, and died after another heart attack on April 27, 1988. His body was cremated, and his ashes spread near the Au Sable River in Northern Lower Michigan, where Bear had liked to flyfish.

== Legacy ==
F.B. Bear applied for a patent on April 21, 1950. On January 12, 1954, Patent 2,665,678 was issued for the Composite Archery Bow. (USPTO Patent Full-Text and Image Database: US-2665678-A).

Bear has been immortalized in the song "Fred Bear" from the album Spirit of the Wild by hard rock musician Ted Nugent, who was Bear's friend.

Grayling, Michigan, was home to Fred Bear and Bear Archery Company.

Since 1999, Fred Bear Day is celebrated annually on March 5th in Grayling, MI. The Fred Bear Day celebration is currently a 3 day event that features a 21 Whistling Arrow Salute, trade show and luncheon with raffles and guest speakers. The festivities have grown since the creation of the non-profit organization, Fred Bear Day, Inc. Their mission is to remember, honor, and keep the spirit of Fred Bear alive.

Groundbreaking for a memorial statue in Grayling, MI took place in 2022. A 7ft tall bronze statue of Fred Bear is set to be erected in the Grayling City Park on September 7, 2024. The artist, Ben Watts, is also responsible for the 11-foot statue of Fred Bear located in the Wonders of Wildlife Museum in Springfield, MO, in the Archery Hall of Fame. He is also known for his wildlife, western, and figurative sculptures and has also created works for notable figures such as NFL legend Walter Payton and U.S. Senator Howell Heflin. Local company, Jack Millikin, Inc, donated the base of the statue. Thanks to the efforts of the non-profit organization, Fred Bear Day, Inc, Fred Bear will be memorialized forever in Grayling City Park.

=== Fred Bear Museum ===
Fred Bear Museum
- Established: 1967
- Location: Springfield, Missouri
- Type: Hunting

The Fred Bear Museum originated in Grayling, Michigan in 1967. Eventually the museum's collection represented the largest privately held collection of archery artifacts in the world. At first the museum remained behind in Grayling, but in 1985 it too was moved to Gainesville, where it found a home in the Bear Archery plant between Archer Road and Williston Road, just off of I-75. That museum closed in 2003, and the collections were sold to the Bass Pro Shops chain.

Since then, the Fred Bear Museum was displayed at the headquarters store of Bass Pro Shops in Springfield, Missouri. Exhibits included the story of Fred Bear and bowhunting history, life-size animal mounts, bowhunting artifacts, some of his trophies and memorabilia, and historical bows and arrows used or built by Fred Bear and his company. The exhibit was temporarily closed due to the construction of an aquarium in the same building. Artifacts from the Fred Bear Museum have now been incorporated into the Archery Hall of Fame and Museum on the upper floor of the Bass Pro Shop Outdoor World.

Fred Bear was also the first president of Michigan's oldest archery club, Detroit Archers. A small collection of his memorabilia is located in the club house. The most prized piece is that of one of his polar bear skins, shot with an arrow. In 2006, Detroit Archers was broken into and the skin was stolen. The case is still open and no suspects or evidence has been found as to the skin's whereabouts.
