= Escalade Sports =

American sports goods company

Escalade Inc.
- Trade name: Escalada Sports
- Company type: Public company
- Traded as: Nasdaq: ESCA
- Industry: Sports equipment
- Predecessor: The Williams Manufacturing Company, Indian Archery and Toy Company
- Founded: 1927; 99 years ago
- Headquarters: Evansville, Indiana, United States
- Area served: United States
- Key people: Armin Boehm (CEO)
- Products: Sporting goods, fitness, and outdoor recreation products
- Number of employees: 215
- Website: escaladeinc.com

Escalade Inc., known as Escalade Sports, is an American sporting goods manufacturer, distributor, and retailer based in Evansville, Indiana. It trades on NASDAQ as ESCA.

== History ==
Escalade Sports was founded in 1927. The company's history traces back to Indian Archery and Toy Company, which later evolved into Escalade Inc. The company expanded its product base from just archery equipment to a wide range of sporting equipment and brands from the 1970s onwards under the leadership of Robert E. Griffin.

In November 2019, CEO David L. Fetherman announced his intent to retire, but would stay on until a successor was chosen. In March 2020, Escalade announced a new CEO, Scott J. Sincerbeaux, formerly an executive at Wolverine World Wide.

During the COVID-19 pandemic, Escalade received $5.6 million in federally backed small business loans as part of the Paycheck Protection Program. The company received scrutiny over this loan, which was aimed at small businesses. The company has access to a $50 million line of credit, has said they have a "strong balance sheet", and have seen increased demand for their products. Escalade paid the entire $5.6 million back on April 28, 2020, two days after The New York Times article.

In October 2020, Escalade acquired American Heritage Billiards for $1.55 million.

In 2022, Life Fitness agreed to sell its Brunswick Billiards business unit to Escalade for $32 million.

In 2025, the company announced that it had appointed Armin Boehm as chief executive officer (CEO) and president after the retirement of the previous CEO, Walter P. Glazer, Jr.

== Subsidiaries ==
- Escalade Sports
- Indian Industries, Inc.
- Bear Archery, Inc.
- EIM Company, Inc.
- Escalade Insurance, Inc.
- Escalade Sports Playground, Inc.
- Harvard Sports, Inc.
- SOP Services, Inc.
- US Weight, Inc.
- Wedcor Holdings, Inc.
- Goalsetter Systems, Inc.
- Lifeline Products, LLC
- Victory Made, LLC
- Victory Tailgate, LLC
