= Lake Margrethe =

Lake in the state of Michigan, United States

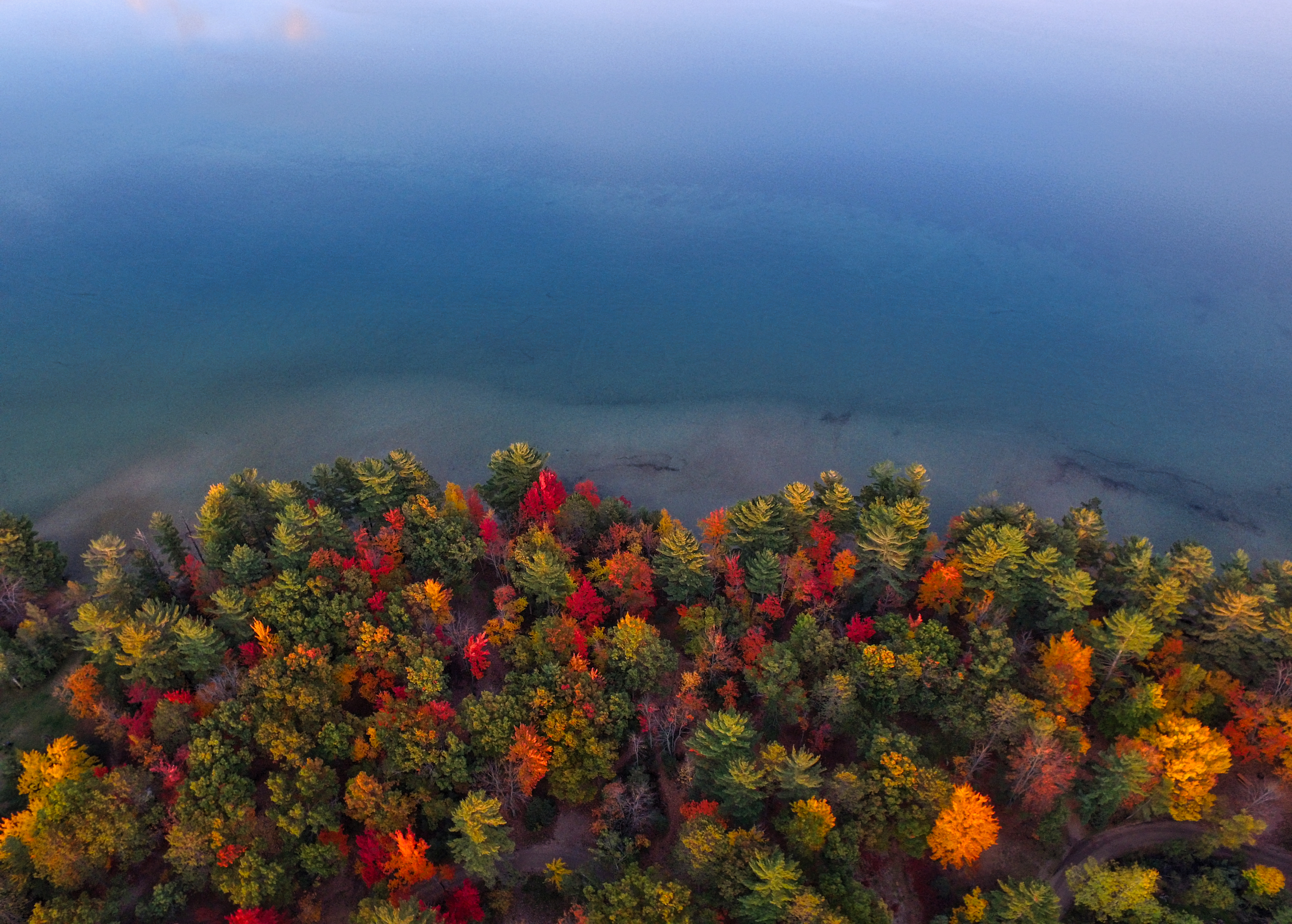
- Aerial view of the western coastline

- Location within Michigan
- Location: Crawford County, Michigan
- Coordinates: 44°39.09′N 84°47.33′W
- Primary outflows: Portage Creek
- Basin countries: United States
- Surface area: 1,920 acres (780 ha)
- Average depth: 36 ft (11 m)
- Max. depth: 65 ft (20 m)
- Surface elevation: 1,135 ft (346 m)

Lake Margrethe is near Grayling in Crawford County, Michigan. Its area is 1,920 acres (780 ha). It was formerly known as Portage Lake. Fish species include: rock bass, yellow perch, bluegill, smallmouth bass, largemouth bass, northern pike, tiger muskie, and walleye.

- Portions of the Lake are within Camp Grayling. It is a favorite fishing and recreation lake for soldiers in their off-duty hours.
- There is also Lake Margrethe State Forest campground. This provides access for use by area residents, campers and tourists, who access the lake from the state forest campground located at its northwest corner.
- Lake Margrethe was renamed after the wife of lumber baron Rasmus Hanson (1846–1927). Mr. Hanson also founded the Grayling Fish Hatchery in 1914, and contributed real estate in three counties to the State of Michigan for military training, now known as Camp Grayling. Most of the lake is relatively shallow, especially the northernmost parts of the lake, those closest to M-72 Highway. The western bay has areas that exceed 40 feet, and the southern bay has a maximum depth of around 65 feet in a single small hole. Lake Margrethe is well known for its fishing.

== See also ==
- List of lakes in Michigan
