= Grayling, Michigan =

- City
- City of Grayling
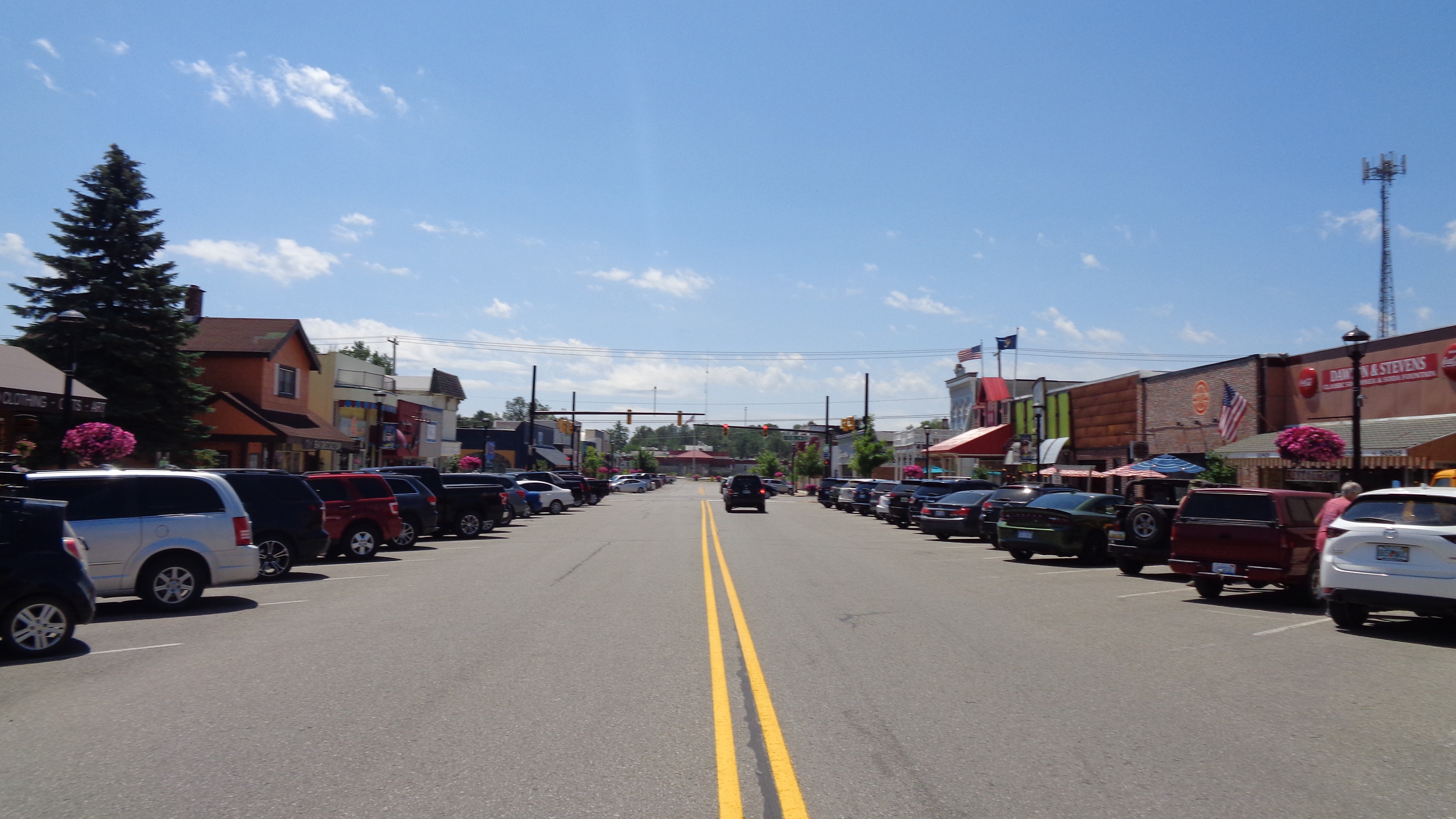
- Michigan Avenue facing I-75 BL / M-72

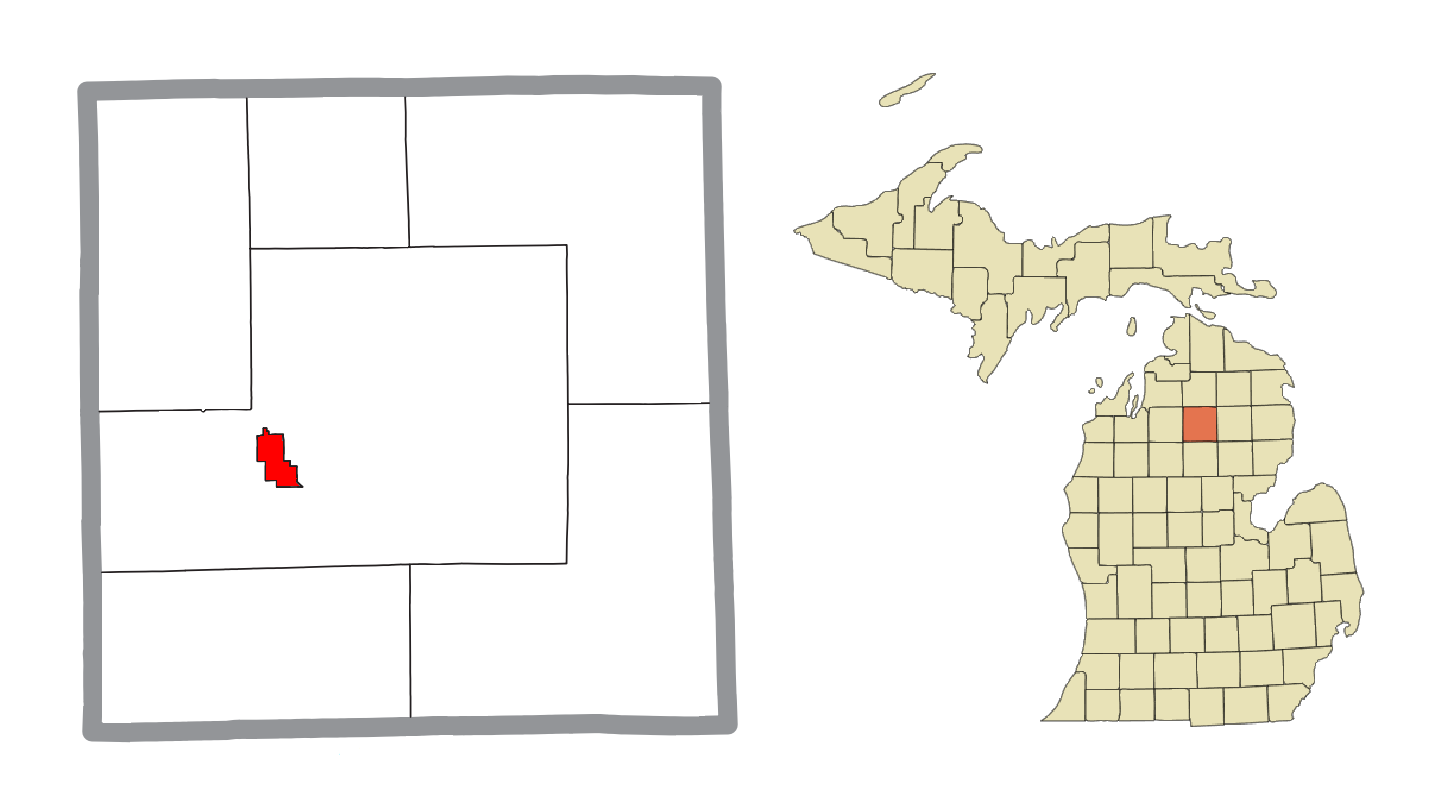
- Location within Crawford County

- Location within the state of Michigan Location within the United States
- Coordinates: 44°39′47″N 84°42′39″W
- Country: United States
- State: Michigan
- County: Crawford
- Founded: 1872

Government
  - Type: Mayor–council
  - Mayor: Heather Forbes
  - Clerk: Lisa Johnson

Area
  - Total: 2.08 sq mi (5.39 km^{2})
  - Land: 2.05 sq mi (5.31 km^{2})
  - Water: 0.031 sq mi (0.08 km^{2})
- Elevation: 1,138 ft (347 m)

Population (2020)
  - Total: 1,867
  - Density: 910.9/sq mi (351.71/km^{2})
- Time zone: UTC-5 (Eastern (EST))
  - Summer (DST): UTC-4 (EDT)
- ZIP code(s): 49738, 49739
- Area code: 989
- FIPS code: 26-34640
- GNIS feature ID: 0627264
- Website: Official website

Grayling (/ˈɡreɪlɪŋ/ GRAY-ling) is a city in and the county seat of Crawford County in the U.S. state of Michigan. It is the only incorporated community in Crawford County. As of the 2020 census, Grayling had a population of 1,867. The city is surrounded by Grayling Charter Township, but the two are administered autonomously.

The city is located in the middle of the Northern Michigan region at the junctions of Interstate 75, U.S. Route 127, M-72, and M-93. Grayling is well known for hosting the Au Sable River Canoe Marathon in July of every year since 1947. The city is named after the grayling species of fish once abundant in the Au Sable River, although the species has been extirpated in Michigan since 1936. There have been many attempts to bring grayling back to the area but none have been successful.

== History ==
Michael Shoat Hartwick was Grayling's first settler. On the west side of the railroad tracks, he built a log hotel. The railroad platted out 40 acres (where Grayling now stands), naming it "Crawford". Fish swimming in the river were identified as grayling, and it is said that the residents preferred the name "Grayling" to "Crawford," and renamed the area after the fish.

Grayling's access to two major rivers (Au Sable River and Manistee River), and the presence of the vast forest around it, made it important in the lumber era. Logs were floated down the rivers to the lakes.

Grayling has had other names through the years. It was called "AuSable", "Forest", "Crawford Station", and during the lumbering era "Milltown".

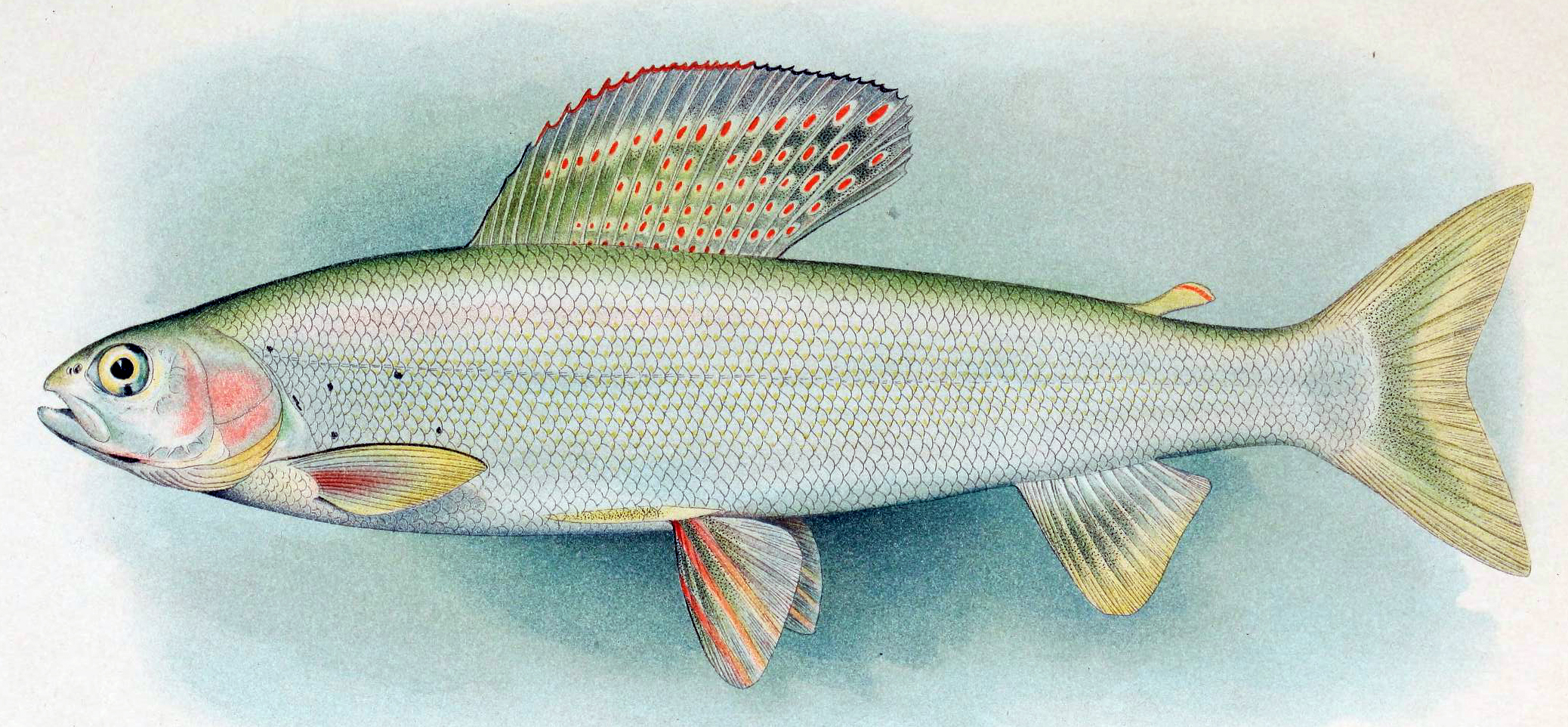
Lumbering practices destroyed Arctic grayling breeding grounds in rivers and contributed to their slow decline and eventual disappearance from Northern Michigan.

The Arctic grayling that had inhabited much of Northern Michigan was eventually wiped out. The logging practice of using river beds to move logs in the springtime destroyed the breeding grounds for these fish. Before they could recover, non-native sport fish such as brook trout were introduced in the 1890s and competed with the grayling for food.

The Grayling Fish Hatchery was founded in 1914 by timber baron Rasmus Hanson (1846–1927). He hoped to restore the grayling to the Au Sable River system; ironically, its disappearance was caused, at least in part, by the massive habitat destruction caused by logging, which was the source of Mr. Hanson's and other lumber barons' immense wealth. Other famous contributors to the initial costs of the hatchery included Henry Ford, Edsel Ford, and Thomas Edison. The grayling became extinct in Michigan. Nevertheless, the hatchery continued to play an important role in natural resource conservation. In 1926, it was sold to the state of Michigan. It continued to be operated as a fish hatchery and tourist attraction until the mid-1960s. In 1995, Michigan sold the property to Crawford County. It is being operated by a privately owned fish farm, although continues to be open to the public during the summer.

Rasmus Hanson is an important person in the history of Grayling. He was born in 1846 in Denmark and emigrated to the United States some time later. At age 16 he began working in the lumber field. Two years later, E. N. Salling, Nelson Michelson, and Hanson organized the first Salling-Hanson Company. After nearly 50 years of service, the Salling Hanson Company had shut down its operation in January 1927. Hanson was a successful entrepreneur and created many businesses in Northern Michigan. Along with being one of three lumber barons of Northern Michigan, Hanson owned the Michigan Sugar Company and the Bay City Sugar Company. In 1916, he donated 13,826 acres of cut-over land in Crawford County to the state of Michigan for use as a forest game preserve and military reservation. This land became the first state-owned game preserve. The area south of Lake Margrethe (named in honor of Hanson's wife, Margrethe) continues to be used as a National Guard base that serves Michigan, Ohio, and Indiana guards. Since 1947, Grayling has been the starting point of the Au Sable River Canoe Marathon, which is held every year on the last weekend of July. This is the longest nonstop canoe race in North America.

== Geography ==
According to the United States Census Bureau, the city has a total area of 2.04 square miles (5.28 km^{2}), of which 2.01 square miles (5.21 km^{2}) is land and 0.03 square miles (0.08 km^{2}) (1.47%) is water.

- The middle branch of the Au Sable River passes through the city.
- According to the United States Census Bureau, the city has a total area of 2.04 square miles (5.28 km^{2}), of which 2.01 square miles (5.21 km^{2}) is land and 0.03 square miles (0.08 km^{2}) is water.
- The city is near Lake Margrethe.
- Hartwick Pines State Park is just 7 miles (11 km) north and northeast of Grayling.
- The Huron portion of the Huron-Manistee National Forests is about the same distance due east.
- North Down River Road is east of the city along the Au Sable River, which runs parallel to it. It is a designated National Scenic Byway for the 23 miles (37 km) that go into Oscoda. The Lumberman's Monument is located along the byway.
- An oilfield is located about 4 miles (6.4 km) south of M-93 on Military Road.

=== Geographic features ===
- Much of the area sits on the "Grayling outwash plain", a unique habitat named for the city.

=== Climate ===
This climatic region has large seasonal temperature differences, with warm to hot (and often humid) summers and cold (sometimes severely cold) winters. According to the Köppen climate classification system, Grayling has a humid continental climate, Dfb on climate maps.

Climate data for Grayling, Michigan, 1991–2020 normals, extremes 1891–present
Month	Jan	Feb	Mar	Apr	May	Jun	Jul	Aug	Sep	Oct	Nov	Dec	Year
Record high °F (°C)	57 (14)	63 (17)	85 (29)	89 (32)	98 (37)	103 (39)	104 (40)	102 (39)	101 (38)	87 (31)	75 (24)	64 (18)	104 (40)
Mean maximum °F (°C)	44.3 (6.8)	47.2 (8.4)	60.9 (16.1)	74.8 (23.8)	85.5 (29.7)	90.3 (32.4)	90.9 (32.7)	89.5 (31.9)	85.9 (29.9)	76.7 (24.8)	61.7 (16.5)	48.7 (9.3)	93.6 (34.2)
Mean daily maximum °F (°C)	26.0 (−3.3)	28.7 (−1.8)	39.4 (4.1)	52.8 (11.6)	67.0 (19.4)	76.6 (24.8)	80.2 (26.8)	78.5 (25.8)	70.7 (21.5)	56.6 (13.7)	42.7 (5.9)	31.5 (−0.3)	54.2 (12.3)
Daily mean °F (°C)	17.8 (−7.9)	18.7 (−7.4)	27.9 (−2.3)	40.8 (4.9)	53.8 (12.1)	63.7 (17.6)	67.6 (19.8)	66.0 (18.9)	58.0 (14.4)	46.0 (7.8)	34.4 (1.3)	24.6 (−4.1)	43.3 (6.3)
Mean daily minimum °F (°C)	9.7 (−12.4)	8.7 (−12.9)	16.4 (−8.7)	28.8 (−1.8)	40.7 (4.8)	50.8 (10.4)	55.1 (12.8)	53.4 (11.9)	45.3 (7.4)	35.4 (1.9)	26.2 (−3.2)	17.7 (−7.9)	32.3 (0.2)
Mean minimum °F (°C)	−15.6 (−26.4)	−15.7 (−26.5)	−8.5 (−22.5)	12.2 (−11.0)	24.8 (−4.0)	34.9 (1.6)	41.7 (5.4)	38.5 (3.6)	30.6 (−0.8)	21.4 (−5.9)	8.7 (−12.9)	−4.0 (−20.0)	−21.3 (−29.6)
Record low °F (°C)	−34 (−37)	−42 (−41)	−38 (−39)	−12 (−24)	14 (−10)	23 (−5)	28 (−2)	26 (−3)	16 (−9)	7 (−14)	−9 (−23)	−28 (−33)	−42 (−41)
Average precipitation inches (mm)	1.82 (46)	1.39 (35)	1.68 (43)	3.39 (86)	3.23 (82)	3.64 (92)	3.07 (78)	3.26 (83)	3.22 (82)	4.01 (102)	2.58 (66)	1.95 (50)	33.24 (845)
Average snowfall inches (cm)	25.8 (66)	18.9 (48)	10.8 (27)	4.2 (11)	0.1 (0.25)	0.0 (0.0)	0.0 (0.0)	0.0 (0.0)	0.0 (0.0)	1.4 (3.6)	6.9 (18)	20.2 (51)	88.3 (224.85)
Average precipitation days (≥ 0.01 in)	18.6	13.8	11.6	12.3	13.6	12.5	12.0	12.4	13.7	17.4	16.0	17.4	171.3
Average snowy days (≥ 0.1 in)	14.3	10.5	6.2	2.1	0.2	0.0	0.0	0.0	0.0	0.9	4.9	11.4	50.5
Source: NOAA

== Demographics ==
Historical population
Census	Pop.	Note	%±
1910	1,775		—
1920	2,450		38.0%
1930	1,973		−19.5%
1940	2,124		7.7%
1950	2,066		−2.7%
1960	2,015		−2.5%
1970	2,143		6.4%
1980	1,792		−16.4%
1990	1,944		8.5%
2000	1,952		0.4%
2010	1,884		−3.5%
2020	1,867		−0.9%
U.S. Decennial Census

=== 2020 census ===
As of the 2020 census, Grayling had a population of 1,867. The median age was 39.6 years. 22.1% of residents were under the age of 18 and 21.9% of residents were 65 years of age or older. For every 100 females there were 89.0 males, and for every 100 females age 18 and over there were 86.2 males age 18 and over.

0.0% of residents lived in urban areas, while 100.0% lived in rural areas.

There were 765 households in Grayling, of which 29.3% had children under the age of 18 living in them. Of all households, 29.0% were married-couple households, 23.1% were households with a male householder and no spouse or partner present, and 39.0% were households with a female householder and no spouse or partner present. About 42.1% of all households were made up of individuals and 17.9% had someone living alone who was 65 years of age or older.

There were 891 housing units, of which 14.1% were vacant. The homeowner vacancy rate was 3.2% and the rental vacancy rate was 11.0%.

Racial composition as of the 2020 census
Race	Number	Percent
White	1,673	89.6%
Black or African American	16	0.9%
American Indian and Alaska Native	22	1.2%
Asian	13	0.7%
Native Hawaiian and Other Pacific Islander	0	0.0%
Some other race	6	0.3%
Two or more races	137	7.3%
Hispanic or Latino (of any race)	90	4.8%

=== 2010 census ===
As of the census of 2010, there were 1,884 people, 764 households, and 419 families residing in the city. The population density was 937.3 inhabitants per square mile (361.9/km^{2}). There were 890 housing units at an average density of 442.8 per square mile (171.0/km^{2}). The racial makeup of the city was 97.2% White, 0.7% African American, 0.5% Native American, 0.5% Asian, 0.1% Pacific Islander, 0.1% from other races, and 0.9% from two or more races. Hispanic or Latino of any race were 1.7% of the population.

There were 764 households, of which 29.8% had children under the age of 18 living with them, 32.9% were married couples living together, 16.9% had a female householder with no husband present, 5.1% had a male householder with no wife present, and 45.2% were non-families. 37.7% of all households were made up of individuals, and 18.4% had someone living alone who was 65 years of age or older. The average household size was 2.27 and the average family size was 3.00.

The median age in the city was 38.6 years. 23.8% of residents were under the age of 18; 9.5% were between the ages of 18 and 24; 23.9% were from 25 to 44; 22.1% were from 45 to 64; and 20.7% were 65 years of age or older. The gender makeup of the city was 46.7% male and 53.3% female.

=== 2000 census ===
As of the census of 2000, there were 1,952 people, 828 households, and 481 families residing in the city. The population density was 972.1 inhabitants per square mile (375.3/km^{2}). There were 895 housing units at an average density of 445.7 per square mile (172.1/km^{2}). The racial makeup of the city was 96.88% White, 0.51% African American, 0.87% Native American, 0.77% Asian, 0.15% from other races, and 0.82% from two or more races. Hispanic or Latino of any race were 1.54% of the population.

There were 828 households, out of which 30.7% had children under the age of 18 living with them, 37.4% were married couples living together, 16.3% had a female householder with no husband present, and 41.8% were non-families. 38.3% of all households were made up of individuals, and 20.3% had someone living alone who was 65 years of age or older. The average household size was 2.24 and the average family size was 2.94.

In the city, the population was spread out, with 26.1% under the age of 18, 7.7% from 18 to 24, 24.5% from 25 to 44, 19.1% from 45 to 64, and 22.5% who were 65 years of age or older. The median age was 40 years. For every 100 females, there were 78.4 males. For every 100 females age 18 and over, there were 70.7 males.

The median income for a household in the city was $24,250, and the median income for a family was $29,850. Males had a median income of $29,167 versus $20,060 for females. The per capita income for the city was $13,089. About 21.6% of families and 21.8% of the population were below the poverty line, including 29.5% of those under age 18 and 17.5% of those age 65 or over.

== Arts and culture ==
=== Historical sites and local events ===
The area is proud of its history, and has preserved landmarks, which it uses for historical events, including reenactments.

- Crawford County Historical Museum: Located in downtown's restored railroad depot, the museum offers a nostalgic look at the 19th and 20th centuries, particularly the lumbering era. The depot was saved from demolition by a community effort. The grounds also include a caboose, a military building dedicated to Camp Grayling and local ex-military personnel, a trapper's cabin, and an old-fashioned fire station.
- Wellington Farm Park is a 60-acre (240,000 m^{2}), non-profit living history museum It is dedicated to interpretation of farm life during the Great Depression. Many farming activities are conducted daily with vintage equipment, tools, and methods. The park has many historical buildings including a blacksmith shop, farm market, gristmill, pavilion, sawmill, and summer kitchen. A nature trail is there. Several events are hosted throughout the summer and fall, including "Dairy Days", "Tractor & Engine Show", "Punkin-Chunkin", Halloween Hayrides, and numerous weekend activities. The farm is located on Military Road West of I-75.
- Lake Margrethe is an important attraction of Camp Grayling, and was named after the wife of Rasmus Hanson. It is a favorite fishing and recreation lake for soldiers in their off-duty hours, but also has much use from area residents, campers, and tourists, who access it from the state forest campground located at the lake's northwest corner.
- A number of recurring events occur in the area. A calendar is available.
- Grayling is the starting point for the Au Sable River Canoe Marathon, which runs 120 miles (190 km) from Grayling to Oscoda. It is one of three marathon races that constitute canoe racing's Triple Crown. The race is always held the last full weekend in July during the town's annual AuSable River Festival.
- Hartwick Pines State Park – the location of one of the few remaining old growth eastern white pine forests – has events throughout the year. Particularly notable are "cross country skiing by lantern light" on numerous dates throughout the winter.
- Kirtland Center for the Performing Arts, located at the Kirtland Community College in Roscommon, Michigan, hosts many visiting performers, including regular visits from The Second City traveling ensemble.
- In 1884 The Grayling Hospital, a forty-patient hospital was built. It was destroyed by fire a little over a year later on January 28, 1886. The hospital largely cared for lumber and mill workers injured on the job. In 1911, the Sisters of Mercy opened Mercy Hospital in Grayling, Michigan. The hospital was built by logging barons as a tribute to the lumbermen of Michigan. The hospital held 30 beds and remained for 48 years. In 1956, construction of the new hospital began which had accommodation for 48 people. Construction was finished in 1958. In 1970, the long-term care unit was added to the hospital which had 40 beds. In 2015, the hospital was sold, and the name of the hospital was changed to Munson Healthcare Grayling Hospital.

== Parks and recreation ==
- Grayling is noted as the "Canoe Capital of the World". Several canoe liveries operate on the Au Sable River in Grayling; Carlisle's Canoe, Penrods Resort, and Borchers Canoe & Kayak, the Manistee River is located just west of Grayling.
- Cross-country skiing is an important opportunity in Grayling, which has two of the top-rated cross-country venues in Michigan, namely Hartwick Pines State Park Trails and Mason Tract Pathway. Forbush Corners in nearby Frederic, Michigan, is a world-recognized center for education and training in cross-country skiing, and benefits from early and late snow due to a snow-belt microclimate. Accomplished amateur ski racer David Forbush designed, maintains, and grooms "one of the finest privately owned systems in the Midwest."
- The grayling are gone, but the rainbow trout, brook trout, and brown trout remain. Grayling is a hotbed of fly fishing and angling on the edge of some world-class streams, rivers, and lakes. Particularly notable are two nearby rivers which parallel each other: the Au Sable River, which runs east to Lake Huron and the Manistee River, which runs West to Lake Michigan. Trout abound, driven to a feeding frenzy by prolific and multiple insect hatches.
- As is true in the rest of Michigan, white-tailed deer hunting is locally considered to be a 'sacrament' and the firearms deer opener (November 15) its 'holy day of obligation.' With 70% of Crawford County owned by federal and state government, and open to the public, it is a popular hunting destination.
- Snow shoeing and snow mobile riding are activities that fit right into the local weather and topography.
- Hanson Hills was the first downhill ski area in Michigan. It opened in 1929. It also is a 1000-acre sports park. Being the second downhill ski area to open in the Midwest. It offers a variety of activities throughout the summer and winter. In the summer they offer disc golf, 3D archery, mountain bike and hiking trails. In the winter they have downhill skiing, snowboarding, tubing, snowshoe trails and over 35 km of Nordic Ski Trails. Lessons are provided for skiing and snowboarding. They also have a diversity of trails and slopes with different levels of difficulty. A top Mount Franklin where guests use as a tubing hill, lies the smallest cemetery. This cemetery holds the graves of Pfc. John A. Conroy of Company D (died August 1927) and Pvt. George A. Laine of Company A (died July 14, 1939), from Michigan's storied 125th Infantry Regiment. In 1958 the two headstones had been updated for both graves.
- Michigan Shore to Shore Riding & Hiking Trail passes through Grayling. It runs from Empire to Oscoda, and points north and south. It is a 500-mile (800 km) interconnected system of trails.
- Kirtland's warbler has its habitat in the area.
- Grayling was home to Fred Bear and Bear Archery Company from 1947 to 1978 when a labor strike prompted both to relocate to Gainesville, Florida.

== Military ==
Camp Grayling is a Michigan National Guard training facility located near the city. It is the largest National Guard training base in the United States. Through the year, around 10,000 troops train at the base, and it generates an estimated $20 million in local economic activity. The Guard base sits on land originally donated by Rasmus Hanson and is the nation's largest National Guard training site and the largest military installation east of the Mississippi River. The 147,000 acres (590 km^{2}) are used for year-round training with participation by active and reserve components of the Army, Air Force, Marine Corps and Navy. In February 2026, the U.S. Army and National Guard Bureau designated Camp Grayling's National All-Domain Warfighting Center as a national range for uncrewed aerial systems testing, further solidifying the base's role as a center for advanced military operations.

== Government ==
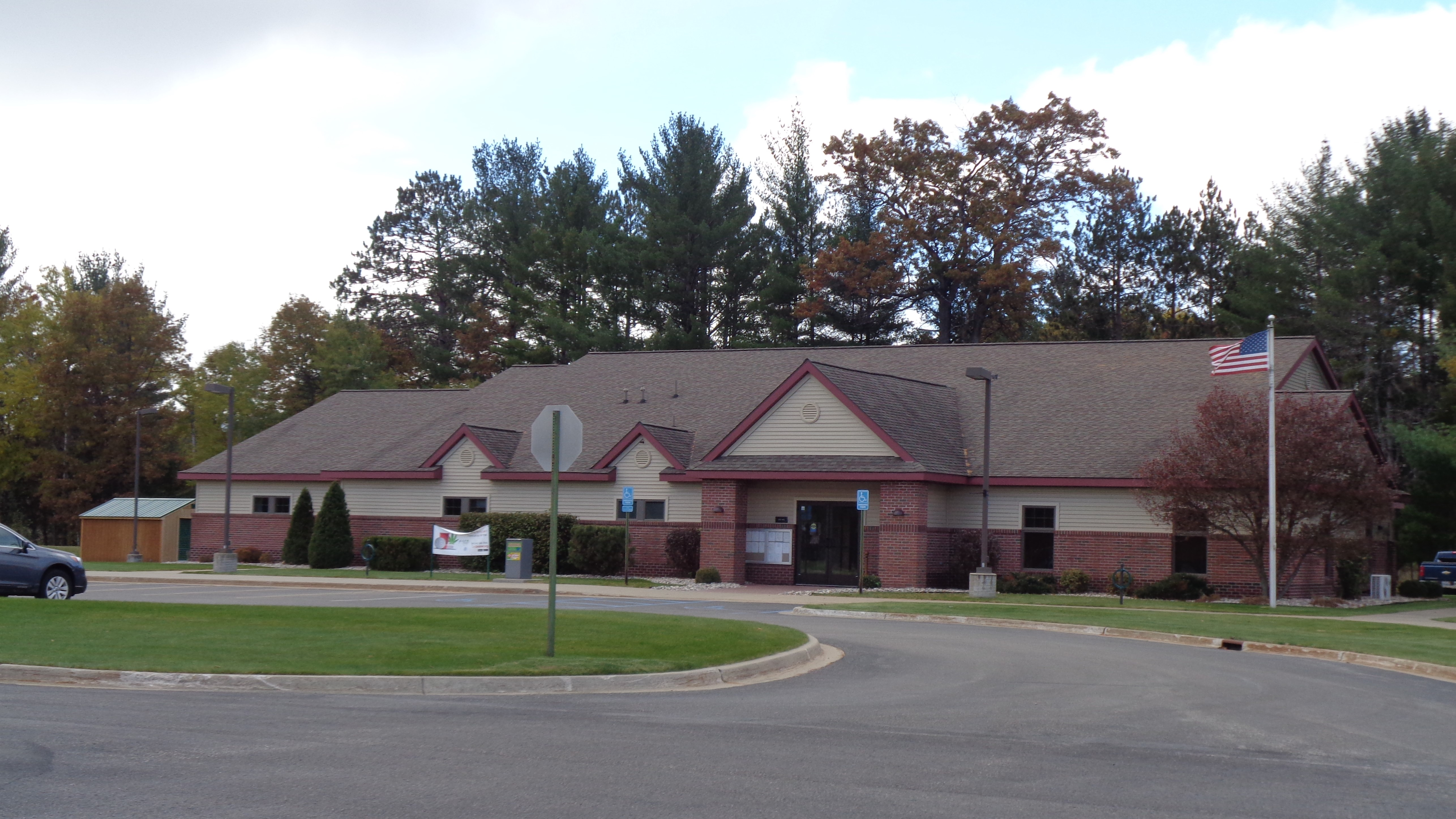
Grayling City Hall

The city levies an income tax of 1% on residents and 0.5% on nonresidents. Grayling is the smallest municipality in Michigan to collect such a tax.

== Education ==
The Crawford AuSable School District is the primary school district for the county, serving the city of Grayling and the nearby community. The district consists of one high school, one middle school, and one elementary school, which serve about 1600 students. In 2013, Grayling High School was ranked at 1503 on Newsweek's America's best high school rating, which rated the top 2000 public high schools in the US based on graduation rate, college acceptance rate, AP tests taken per student, average AP scores, number of students enrolled in AP courses, and average SAT/ACT scores. In 2014, the National Association of State Boards of Education named the district as the top performing rural school district in Michigan.

== Media ==
- The Crawford County Avalanche is the newspaper of record for Crawford County, and is published in Grayling, Michigan.

== Transportation ==
=== Major highways ===
Grayling is 4 miles (6.4 km) north of the confluence of two major north–south freeways: I-75 and US 127, and the junction with M-72, an east–west cross-peninsular state highway route.

- I-75 passes to the east the city and connects with the Mackinac Bridge to the north and Saginaw and Detroit to the south
- BL I-75 is a loop route running through Grayling. It follows the former route of US 27, in part.
- US 127 ends south of Grayling and continues southerly toward Clare and Lansing.
- M-72 passes through the city and is one of three state highway routes that runs east–west across the entire lower peninsula, from Empire on Lake Michigan to Grayling and east to Harrisville on Lake Huron.
- M-93 is an 11-mile (18 km) route connecting the main gate of Michigan Army National Guard's Camp Grayling, 4 miles (6.4 km) southwest of Grayling, with Hartwick Pines State Park, 7 miles (11 km) northeast of Grayling.
- F-32 begins at BL I-75/M-93 on the northern edge of the city and continues toward Mio.

=== Bus travel ===
- Indian Trails provides daily intercity bus service between St. Ignace and East Lansing, Michigan.

== Notable people ==
- Jim Harrison, writer and poet, author of Legends of the Fall, was born in Grayling.
- Norman Z. McLeod, director of films such as Horse Feathers, The Secret Life of Walter Mitty and Topper was born in Grayling.
- Edward Hartwick, famous soldier and personal friend of Theodore Roosevelt graduated from Grayling High School.
- Fred Bear, founder of Bear Archery, expanded his company during 30 years in Grayling.
