= Camp Grayling =

Military training facility in Michigan, US

- Part of Michigan Army National Guard
- Grayling, Michigan in the United States

Site information
- Controlled by: Michigan Army National Guard
- Website: minationalguard.dodlive.mil/camp-grayling/

Location
- Location within Michigan
- Coordinates: 44°38′4″N 84°46′21″W
- Area: 147,000 acres (59,000 ha)

Site history
- Built: 1913

Garrison information
- Current commander: COL Lucas Lanzcy

Camp Grayling is a military training facility located near Grayling, Michigan, United States, primarily in Crawford County, and spread over three counties. Camp Grayling is the main training facility for the Michigan National Guard and is the largest US National Guard training facility in the United States.

== History ==
Camp Grayling was founded in 1913 on an initial grant of land from Grayling lumber baron Rasmus Hanson to the state for military training. It includes 147,000 acres (590 km^{2}) in Crawford, Kalkaska and Otsego counties. Troops first started training at Camp Grayling in 1914.

In 2024 five Shanghai Jiao Tong University students who participated in an exchange program with the University of Michigan were charged with espionage related offenses after being caught during exercises at Camp Grayling which included Taiwanese forces.

In November 2024, Building 31, a 1921 state garage and former welding shop that once stored fire trucks was set to be demolished. In a effort to preserve history they took a brick marked with the number 21 and found it was a time capsule full of artifacts from the year 1921. Colonel Lanczy stated "In both newspapers, it gave us tie-ins with the Army National Guard” and “Even the current units, we have the 1-8 Deuce, the 1-19th, all these units were around here in 1921, and in a press release, like we do today, letting the public know that the guard is coming up to train here at Camp Grayling. It’s cool to see things stay the same.”

Camp Grayling contains a military cemetery with only two graves and is located in the Hanson Hills recreation area. Two 20th-century guardsmen from the 125th Infantry Regiment are buried there.

== Training events ==
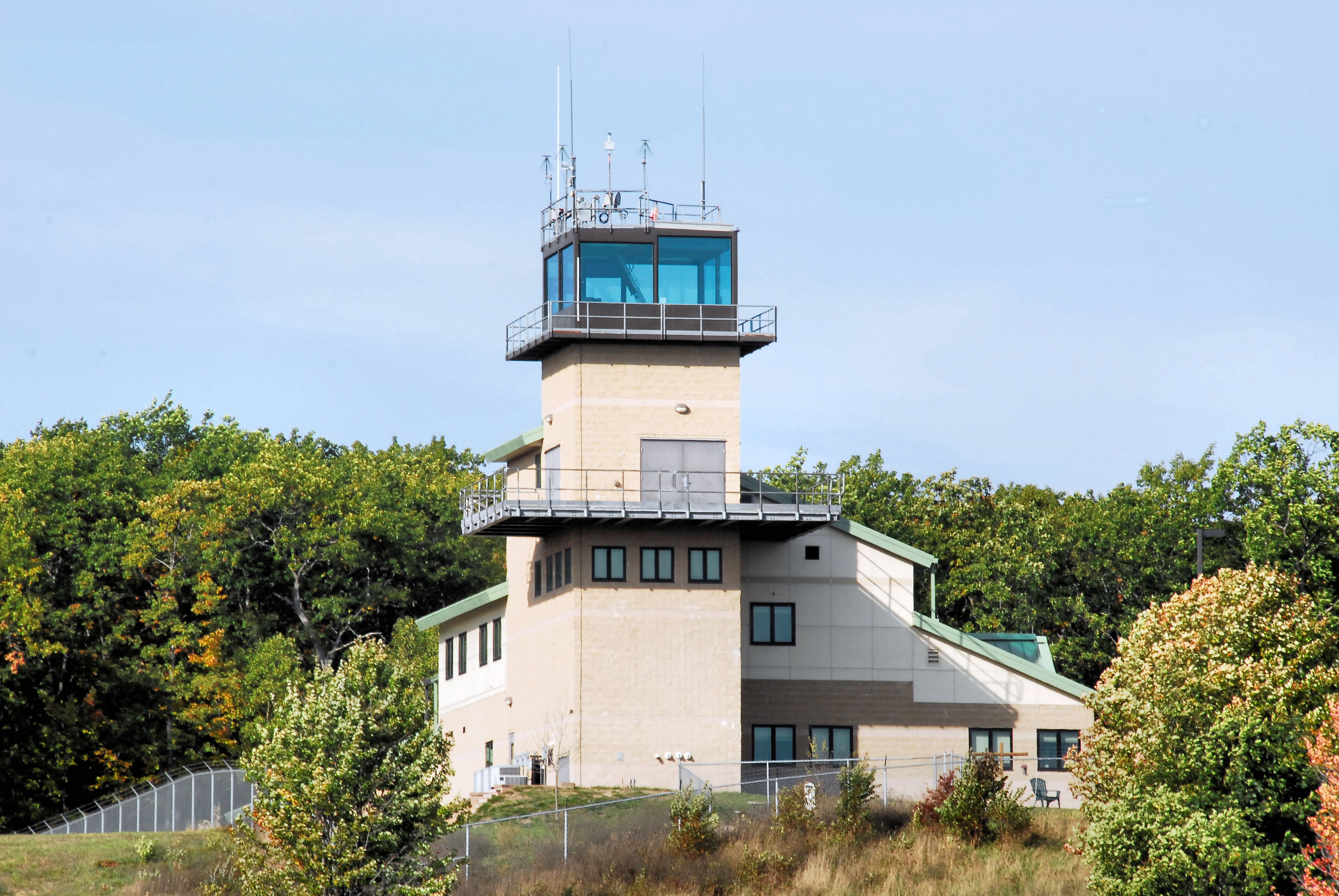
Grayling Air Gunnery Range provides over 147,000 acres of joint use ground maneuver and impact range space

During the summer months, Camp Grayling hosts National Guard units from Michigan, the surrounding states, and Canada. Large artillery, mortar, and tank ranges as well as maneuver courses highlight the camp. Recently Forward Operating Bases have been constructed to allow company-sized units to simulate operations.

For two weeks each year starting in 2014, Camp Grayling hosts the National Guard's Exportable Combat Training Capability program. Each year, Camp Grayling schedules training for over 20,000 military personnel from National Guard units from Indiana, Illinois, Michigan, and Ohio, as well as regular Army and Reserve units.

Each year since 2011 Camp Grayling has hosted Northern Strike. Military units from neighboring states, the U.K. and other U.S. allies participate. During the exercise the population on base swells to over 2,000 military personnel.

In February 2026, the U.S. Army and National Guard Bureau designated Camp Grayling's National All-Domain Warfighting Center (NADWC) as a national range for uncrewed aerial systems (UAS) testing and training.

Grayling Army Airfield is located at Camp Grayling and includes 70 helicopter tiedown pads as well as two 5,000 ft (1,500 m) runways capable of handling C-130 and C-17 aircraft. Camp Grayling has over 600 soldiers in traditional Army National Guard units regularly assigned to it.

The installation provides over 200 full-time jobs to local residents. Consequently, Camp Grayling is one of the largest employers in the county. The camp activities generate over $30 million annually in the local economy.

The camp has a partnership with the Northern Michigan Law Enforcement group for training purposes. The camp has small arms ranges and urban assault ranges. Camp Grayling has an IED (improvised explosive device) Lane. This is used to train troops to protect themselves from IED's. They have a 10.2-mile (16.4 km) live fire convoy commander's reaction course that trains commanders. The post is used for research and development.

A central attraction of Camp Grayling is Lake Margrethe.

== Color Guard appearances ==
Camp Grayling's five-man color guard has appeared on national television alongside Anita Baker, Aretha Franklin, Dr. John, Brian McKnight, Aaron Neville, Diana Ross, Stevie Wonder, and other notable recording artists who performed the national anthem at major sporting events held in Michigan over the years. It provided the colors presentation for four Major League Baseball All-Star Games, eight World Series, Super Bowls XVI and XL, the 1980 Republican National Convention and the 2004 and 2005 NBA Finals. At many aforementioned nationally televised sporting events held in Michigan, they have been joined by a Canadian military color guard, usually that of the Royal Canadian Mounted Police from Ottawa, Ontario.

== Tenant Units ==
Camp Grayling is located in Region 6 of the Michigan Army National Guard. Its tenant units are as follows:

- Joint Maneuver Training Center (ISU)
- 745th Explosive Ordnance Disposal
- 1434th Engineer Company
- 1440th Engineer Detachment
- 1439th Engineer Detachment
- 1442nd Engineer Detachment
- 1071st Maintenance Company
