= James Walton =

James Walton or Jim Walton may refer to:

- James Walton (MP for Preston) (1479/80–1546–50), English politician
- James Walton (MP for Don Valley) (1867–1924), British politician
- James Walton (inventor) (1803–1883), British inventor and industrialist
- James Walton (cricketer) (1857–?), English cricketer
- James B. Walton (1813–1885), veteran of the New Orleans militia unit the Washington Artillery
- James G. Walton, black American Pentecostal spiritual denominational leader
- Bud Walton (James Lawrence Walton, 1921–1995), younger brother of Sam Walton and cofounder of Wal-Mart
- Jim Walton (born 1948), youngest son of Wal-Mart founder Sam Walton
- Jim Walton (journalist) (born 1958), president of CNN Worldwide
- Jim Walton (actor), American actor
- Jim Walton (baseball) (born 1934), American Major League Baseball scout
- Jim Walton (footballer) (1934–2013), former Australian footballer
- James Walton, character in USS Callister
