= Right Rev James Jones =

The Right Rev James Jones may refer to:

- James Jones (bishop) (b. 1948), British retired Church of England bishop
- James F. Jones (minister) (1907-1971), American black Pentecostal pastor, televangelist and faith healer
