= Woodlawn Cemetery (Detroit) =

Cemetery in Michigan, United States

Coordinates: 42.4419°N 83.1261°W

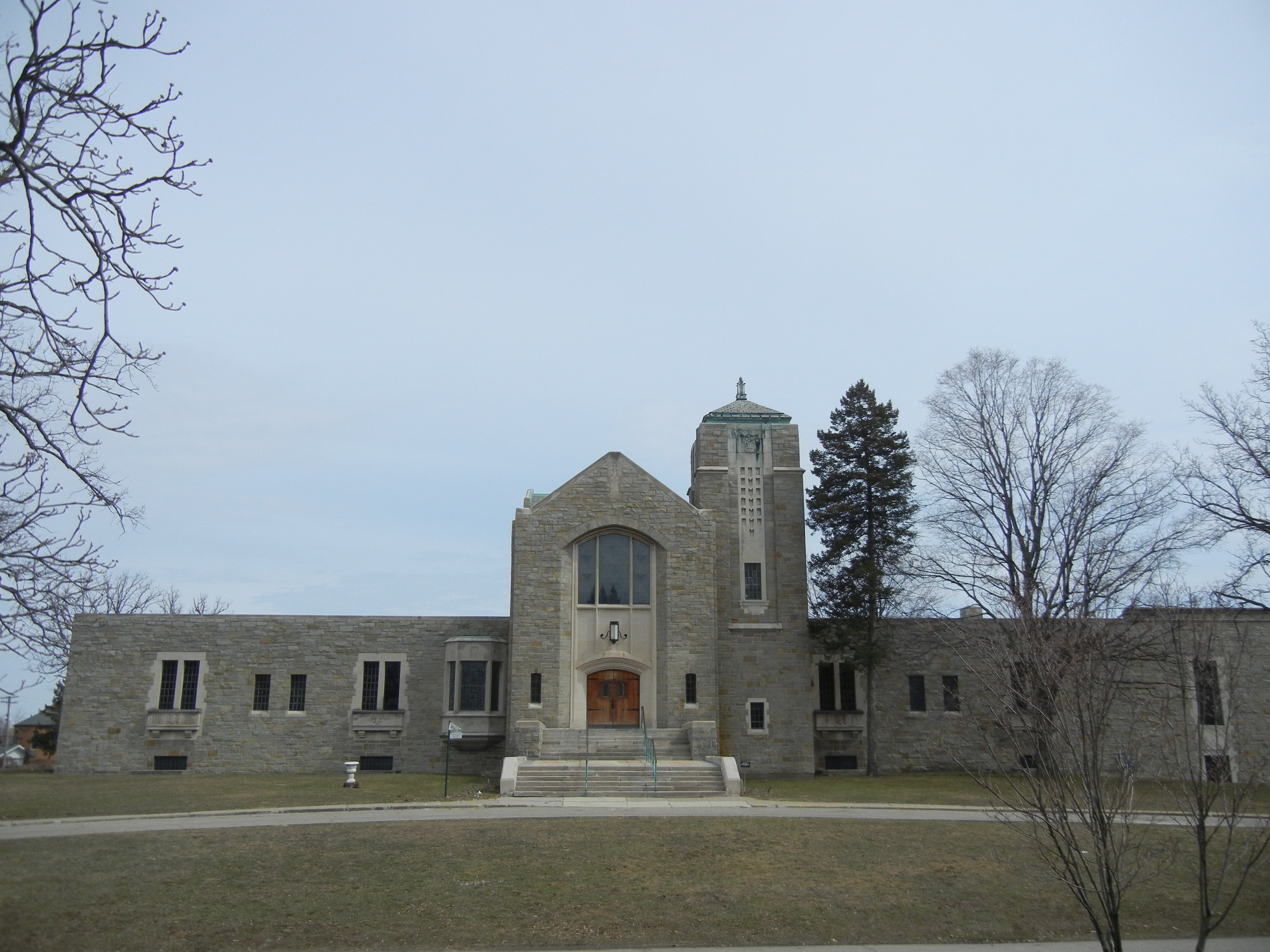
- Woodlawn Mausoleum
- Interactive map of Woodlawn Cemetery

Details
- Established: 1895
- Location: 19975 Woodward Avenue, Detroit, Michigan
- Size: 140 acres (57 ha)

Woodlawn Cemetery is a cemetery located at 19975 Woodward Avenue, opposite the former Michigan State Fairgrounds, between 7 Mile Road and 8 Mile Road, in Detroit, Michigan.

== History ==
The cemetery was established in 1895 and immediately attracted some of the most notable names in the city. The grounds encompass 140 acres (57 ha) and were planned by civil engineer Mason L. Brown and horticulturalist Frank Eurich. At the time of the first burial in 1896, Woodlawn was outside the city limits. Eurich also developed Woodlawn Cemetery in Toledo.

== Notable burials ==
- Clara Arthur (1858–1929) - American suffragist.
- Edgar Albert Guest (1881-1959) – American Poet known as the People's poet
- Don H. Barden (1943–2011) – Casino Gaming and Cable Television entrepreneur
- Renaldo "Obie" Benson (1937–2005) – Member of Motown's Four Tops
- Patricia Hill Burnett (1920-2014) - American portrait artist and women's rights activist
- Roy D. Chapin (1880–1936) – Industrialist, automaker and U.S. Secretary of Commerce
- Albert Cobo (1893–1957) – Mayor of Detroit
- Howard A. Coffin (1877–1956) – Congressman
- John Blaisdell Corliss (1851–1929) – Attorney, Congressman and father-in-law of George M. Holley
- James J. Couzens (1872–1936) – U.S. Senator and Mayor of Detroit
- Edgar Culbertson (1935–1967) – U.S. Coast Guardsman and recipient of the Coast Guard Medal

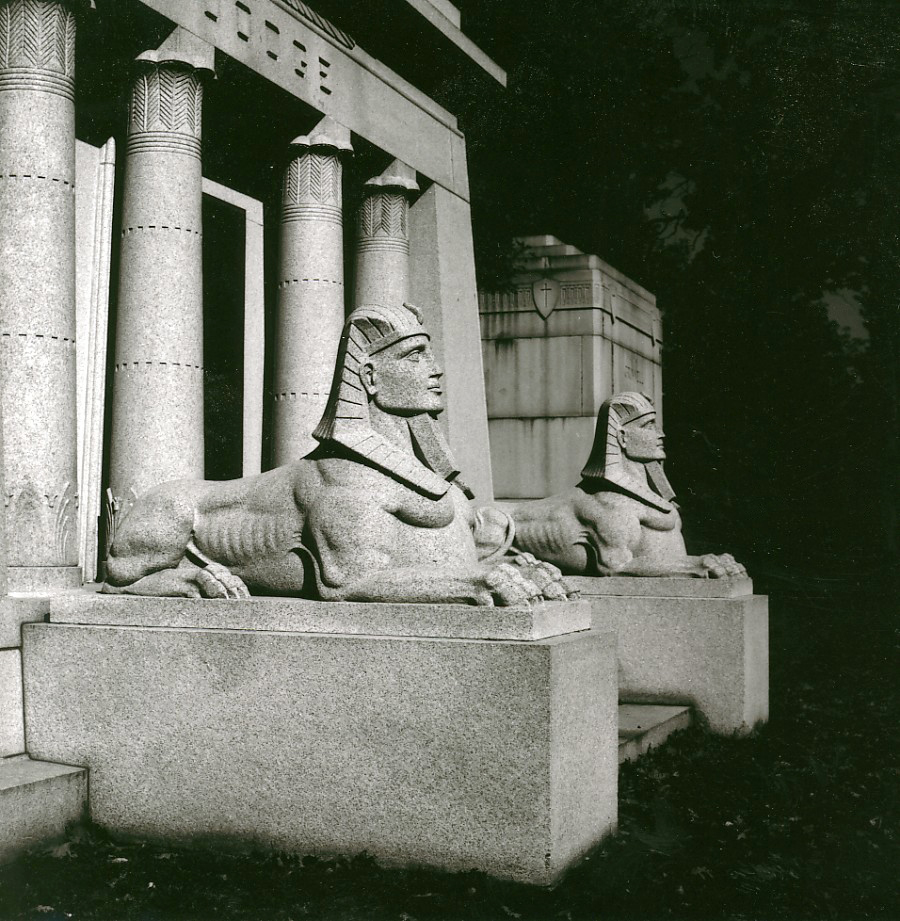
Dodge Brothers Mausoleum

- Anna Thompson Dodge (1866–1970) – Widow of Horace Dodge and philanthropist
- Horace Elgin Dodge (1868–1920) – Businessman and co-founder of Dodge Motors
- John Francis Dodge (1864–1920) – Businessman and co-founder of Dodge Motors
- George Duffield, Jr. (1818–1888) – Presbyterian minister and composer of Stand Up, Stand Up for Jesus
- Dee Edwards (1945–2006) – Soul singer
- Daisy Elliott (1917–2015) – Author and Co-sponsor of Elliott-Larsen Civil Rights Act, Delegate to 1961–62 Constitution of Michigan convention and Michigan State Representative
- Duke Fakir (1935-2024) - Member of Motown's Four Tops
- Henry Fambrough (1938-2024),- Member of the R&B quintet The Spinners
- Homer S. Ferguson (1889–1982) – U.S. Senator, judge and diplomat
- Edsel Ford (1893–1943) – Ford Motor Company president and son of Henry Ford
- Eleanor Clay Ford (1896–1976) – Wife of Edsel Ford and niece of retailer J. L. Hudson
- William Clay Ford Sr. (1925–2014) – grandchild of Henry Ford
- Aretha Franklin (1942–2018), Gospel and Rhythm & Blues (R&B) singer known as The Queen of Soul
- Clarence L. (C.L.) Franklin (1915–1984) – Baptist minister and father of singers Aretha Franklin, Carolyn Franklin and Erma Franklin
- Carolyn Franklin (1944–1988) – Gospel and R&B singer and younger sister of Aretha Franklin
- Erma Franklin (1938–2002) – Gospel and R&B singer and older sister of Aretha Franklin

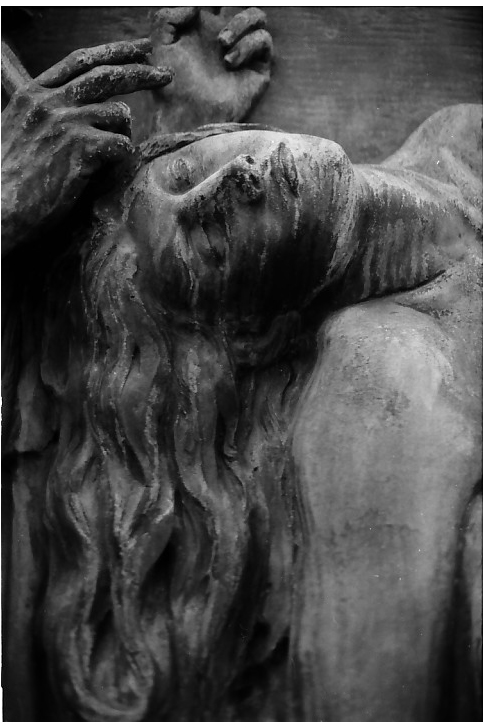
Haass Monument by Charles Keck

- Susie Garrett (1929–2002) – Actress, cast member of the tv series Punky Brewster and sister of actress Marla Gibbs
- Alex Groesbeck (1873–1953) – Michigan Governor and Attorney General
- Major Edward Hartwick (1871-1918) – Military officer and lumberman
- Frank J. Hecker (1846–1927) – Railroad car manufacturer and business partner of art collector Charles Lang Freer
- Billy Henderson (1939–2007) – Lead singer of The Spinners
- George M. Holley Sr. (1878–1963) – Automotive engineer, designer and founder of Holley Carburetor
- DeShaun Dupree "Proof" Holton (1973–2006) – Rap musician
- Joseph L. Hudson (1846–1912) – Department store magnate
- James Jamerson (1938–1983) – Motown bass guitarist
- James (Prophet) Jones (1907–1971) – prominent national and local religious leader during the 1940s and 1950s who was the first African American televangelist of Detroit and founder of the Church of Universal Triumph, Dominion of God, Inc.
- Marv Johnson (1938–1993) – Motown/R&B singer
- Julanne Johnston (1900–1988) – Silent film actress
- Ed Killian (1876–1928) – Major League Baseball pitcher
- Alfred Lucking (1856–1929) – Congressman
- Frederick C. Martindale (1865-1928) – Michigan Secretary of State
- Wade H. McCree (1920–1987) – Lawyer, judge, and U.S. Solicitor General
- Blair Moody (1902–1954) – US Senator and newspaper reporter
- Elijah E. Myers (1832–1909) – Architect of the Colorado, Michigan and Texas State Capitols
- James K. Okubo (1920–1967) – World War II US Army recipient of the Medal of Honor
- Hazen Pingree (1840–1901) – Detroit Mayor and Michigan Governor
- Francis Petrus Paulus (1862-1933) — Artist, teacher, and trustee of the Detroit Museum of Art
- Rosa Parks (1913–2005) – Civil Rights activist
- Edward Patten (1939–2005) – Member of Gladys Knight & the Pips
- Lawrence Payton (1938–1997) – Member of Motown's Four Tops
- Barbara Randolph (1942–2002) – Motown/R&B singer
- David Ruffin (1941–1991) – Lead singer of The Temptations
- Ed Siever (1875–1920) – Major League baseball pitcher
- Howard Sims (1933–2016) – architect in Detroit
- Levi Stubbs (1936–2008) – Lead singer of Motown's Four Tops
- Ron Teasley (1927-2026) - Major League baseball player
- George W. Trendle (1884–1972) – Creator of The Lone Ranger and The Green Hornet
- Carl M. Weideman (1898–1972) – Congressman
- Ronald White (1938–1995) – Member of Motown's The Miracles
- Richard Storrs Willis (1819–1900) – Composer of It Came Upon a Midnight Clear and other hymns
- Earl Wilson (1934–2005) – Major League Baseball pitcher
- Matilda Dodge Wilson – (1883–1967) Widow of John Dodge and Alfred Wilson, benefactor of Michigan State University – now Oakland University and Detroit's Music Hall and Lieutenant Governor of Michigan
- Pop Winans (1934–2009) – gospel singer and patriarch of the gospel group the Winans family
- Ronald Winans (1956–2005) – gospel singer and member of the gospel group the Winans family

== Sources ==
- Kvaran, Einar Einarsson, Cemetery Sculpture in America, unpublished manuscript
- Nawrocki, Dennis Alan and Thomas J. Holleman, Art in Detroit Public Places, Wayne State University Press, Detroit, Michigan, 1980
- Northup, A. Dale, Detroit's Woodlawn Cemetery, Arcadia Publishing, 2003
