= Edward E. Hartwick Memorial Building =

- U.S. National Register of Historic Places
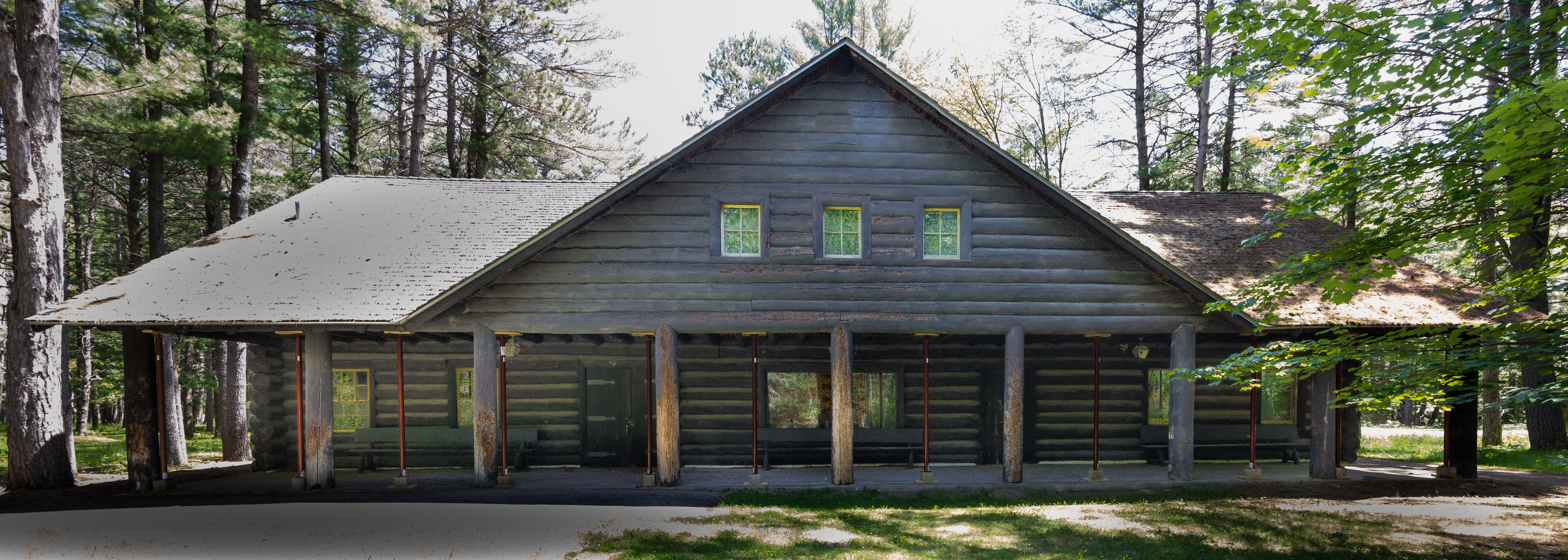

- Location within Michigan Location within the United States
- Interactive map
- Location: Hartwick Pines Rd., Grayling Charter Township
- Coordinates: 44°44′25″N 84°39′14″W
- Area: less than one acre
- Built: 1929
- Architect: Ralph B. Herrick
- Architectural style: Rustic log
- NRHP reference No.: 98001216
- Added to NRHP: October 1, 1998

The Edward E. Hartwick Memorial Building is a museum building located on Hartwick Pines Road in Grayling Charter Township, Michigan, in the Hartwick Pines State Park. It was listed on the National Register of Historic Places in 1998.

== History ==
In 1927, Mrs. Karen Hartwick donated the land that is now the Hartwick Pines State Park to the Michigan Department of Conservation. In 1929, the Department erected this building as a memorial to Mrs. Hartwick's husband, Major Edward Hartwick, who died in action during World War I. The building was probably designed by Ralph B. Herrick of the architectural firm of Herrick and Simpson. Some additional structures were constructed in the park, including a residence, barn, small campground, and a parking area. However, work was halted by the onset of the Great Depression, and did not resume until 1933, when workers from the Civilian Conservation Corps arrived. CCC workers finished the interior of the Memorial Building and constructed other buildings in the park.

A new visitor center was constructed in 1994; the building has been vacant since 2012.

== Description ==
The Edward E. Hartwick Memorial Building is a 1-1/2 story rustic log structure built entirely of Michigan pine, measuring 71 feet (22 m) by 46 feet (14 m). A wide porch stretching across the front is covered by a continuous roof. The interior features a large center hall with a cathedral ceiling and a massive fieldstone fireplace, and a second-floor mezzanine. The Memorial Building is one of the few remaining examples of the rustic log architecture used in the 1920s and 1930s by the Michigan State Park system.

== Gallery ==
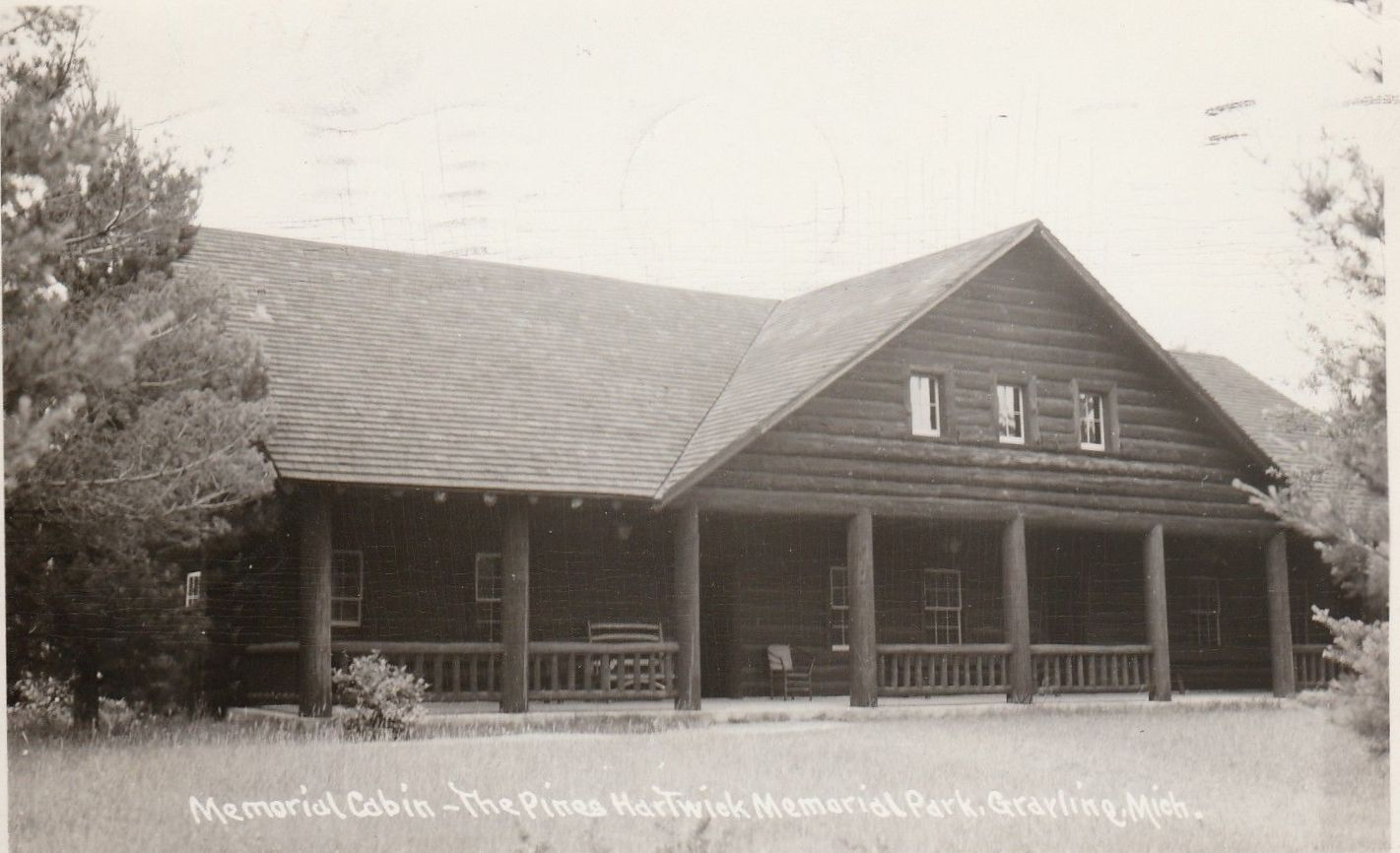
Early photo of the building

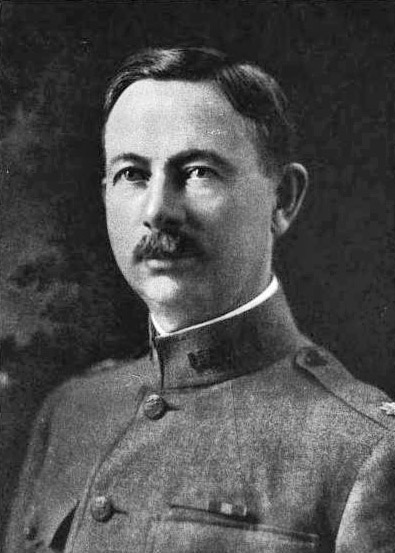
Major Edward E. Hartwick

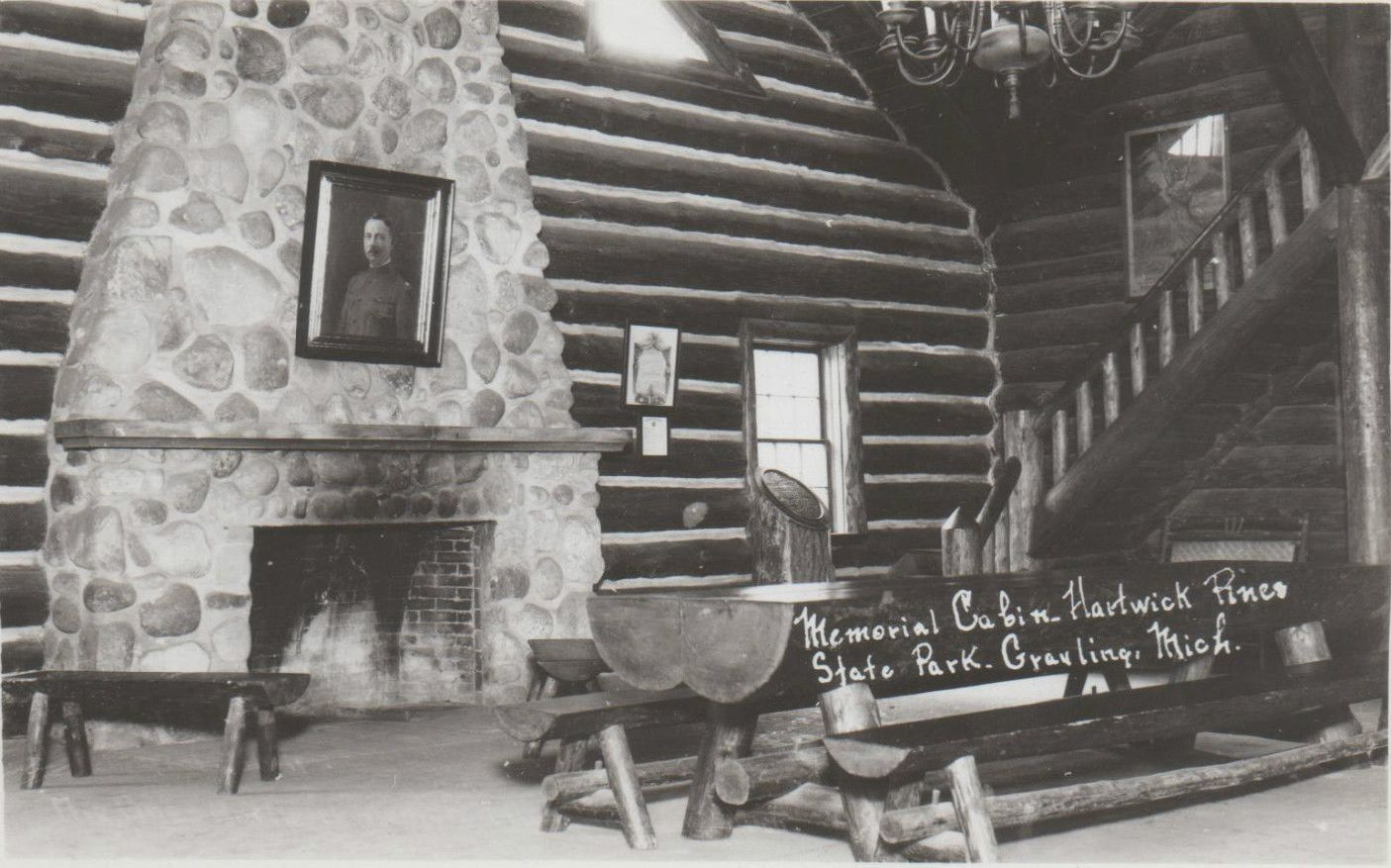
Interior
