= Clara Arthur =

American suffragist

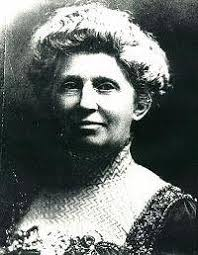
- Born: Clara Peters; October 25, 1858; Saint John, New Brunswick, Canada
- Died: July 26, 1929 (aged 70)
- Resting place: Woodlawn Cemetery, Detroit
- Occupations: Suffragist, social activist
- Known for: "Mother of the Playground Movement"
- Spouse: James Arthur

Clara Arthur (October 25, 1858 – July 26, 1929) was an American suffragist. She was inducted into the Michigan Women's Hall of Fame. After suffrage was achieved in Michigan, she devoted her efforts to establishing playgrounds in the city of Detroit. Arthur is known as the "Mother of the Playground Movement".

== Biography ==
Clara Arthur née Peters was born in 1858 in Saint John, New Brunswick, British North America. In 1885, she co-founded the Michigan Equal Suffrage Association, which she would be elected president of in 1906. As president, Arthur succeeded in amending the Constitution of Michigan to allow white women to vote on certain issues (such as on taxes and bonds). Arthur was also an important driver of the statewide effort to gain women's suffrage, which succeeded in 1918 after six years of campaigning.

Arthur learned about the playground movement through groups that constructed them in cities like Boston and Chicago. She began to promote the building of playgrounds; constructing Detroit's first playground in 1899 by converting an empty lot to a playground. She researched about their benefits and heavily advocated for the establishment of a playground system. In 1901, the Local Council of Women of Detroit formed a 'playground committee', which Arthur was at the head of.

She developed a plan for a system of playgrounds, which the city council initially refused to institute. She went to the Detroit Public Schools Community District and got permission to make a playground on the grounds of a school. After its success, the city council agreed to fund a wider program. Later in life she was known as the "Mother of the Playground Movement". Arthur is credited with helping establish the system of playgrounds in Detroit, leading to 138 playgrounds and 17 swimming pools in 1929 with a budget of over $1 million. She used her wealth to fund the construction of playgrounds, baths, and fight against tuberculosis.

An advocate against child labor, Arthur served on the National Child Labor Committee. She was also an active member of the Michigan Federation of Women's Clubs, chairing the industrial and child labor committees. Arthur was one of the founders of the Detroit Anti Tuberculosis Society and worked towards building the Detroit Tuberculosis Sanitarium.

Arthur died July 26, 1929. She was buried in Detroit in Woodlawn Cemetery.
