= Louis H. Narcisse =

American religious leader

His Grace Bishop King Louis H. Narcisse
- Church: Mt. Zion Spiritual Church, Inc.
- Installed: 1943–45
- Term ended: 1989

Personal details
- Born: Louis Herbert Narcisse; April 27, 1921 New Orleans, Louisiana
- Died: February 3, 1989 (aged 67) Detroit, Michigan
- Buried: Rolling Hills Memorial Park; Richmond, California
- Denomination: Baptist; Spiritual Church Movement
- Residence: Oakland, California; Detroit, Michigan
- Occupation: Pastor vocalist musician gospel singer composer
- Profession: Shipyard worker
- Motto: “It's so nice to be nice”

Louis H. Narcisse (April 27, 1921 – February 3, 1989), also known as King Louis H. Narcisse, was an American religious leader and the founder of the Mt. Zion Spiritual Church. He claimed religious leaders of the time such as Father Divine, Daddy Grace and, James F. Jones were his divine predecessors.

He was an organizer and spiritual healer in Oakland, California. He was also a gospel minister, vocalist, musician, and composer with whom gospel singer Mahalia Jackson often collaborated. He was the uncle of renowned African-American gospel singer Bessie Griffin (July 6, 1922 – April 10, 1989). They died within months of each other in 1989.

== Early life ==
Louis Herbert Narcisse was born on April 27, 1921, in New Orleans, Louisiana, to Stella Narcisse. His father, Jesse Narcisse, was killed in a shipboard accident before his birth. The youngest of four siblings, Narcisse came from a devout Baptist family. At an early age, Narcisse believed that he had been touched by the hand of God. His singing talents were first locally recognized in New Orleans when he was a teenager, where Narcisse won five radio auditions. As a teen, he became a soloist at church services and funerals.

== Ministry ==
At 18 years old, Narcisse entered into the Christian ministry in the summer of 1939. Narcisse migrated to California during World War II when he said that God spoke to him to come to California. He found a job in Hunter's Point Shipyards in San Francisco, California as an electrical worker earning $85 a week. He lived at a Hunter's Point World War II Housing Project.

In South San Francisco the Mt. Zion movement began with a small prayer meeting, from there Narcisse founded Mount Zion Spiritual Temple in Oakland on November 8, 1945 under the credo "It's so nice to be nice." The church was named after his boyhood church in New Orleans, Mt. Zion Baptist Church, which had been the place of his baptism, but Narcisse's Mount Zion Spiritual Temple was actually a Spiritualist church in the African-American Spiritual Church Movement tradition. As his popularity grew, he presided over several churches in Oakland, Sacramento, Houston, and Detroit, and travelled between them.

== Death ==
Narcisse died February 3, 1989, of a heart attack in his Detroit mansion. He was interred at Rolling Hills Memorial Park in Richmond, California.

== Discography ==
- 1950: Rev. Louis Narcisse
- 1951: Rev. Louis Narcisse & the Celestial Tones
- 1953: Bishop Narcisse
- 1955: Bishop Louis H. Narcisse and Mt. Zion Spiritual Choir
- 1959: Bishop H. Narcisse
- 1959: King Louis H. Narcisse & His Wings of Faith Choir
- 1960: Leaning on Jesus
- 1962/64: His Grace King Louis H. Narcisse
