= Hartwick Pines State Park =

Park in Michigan, United States

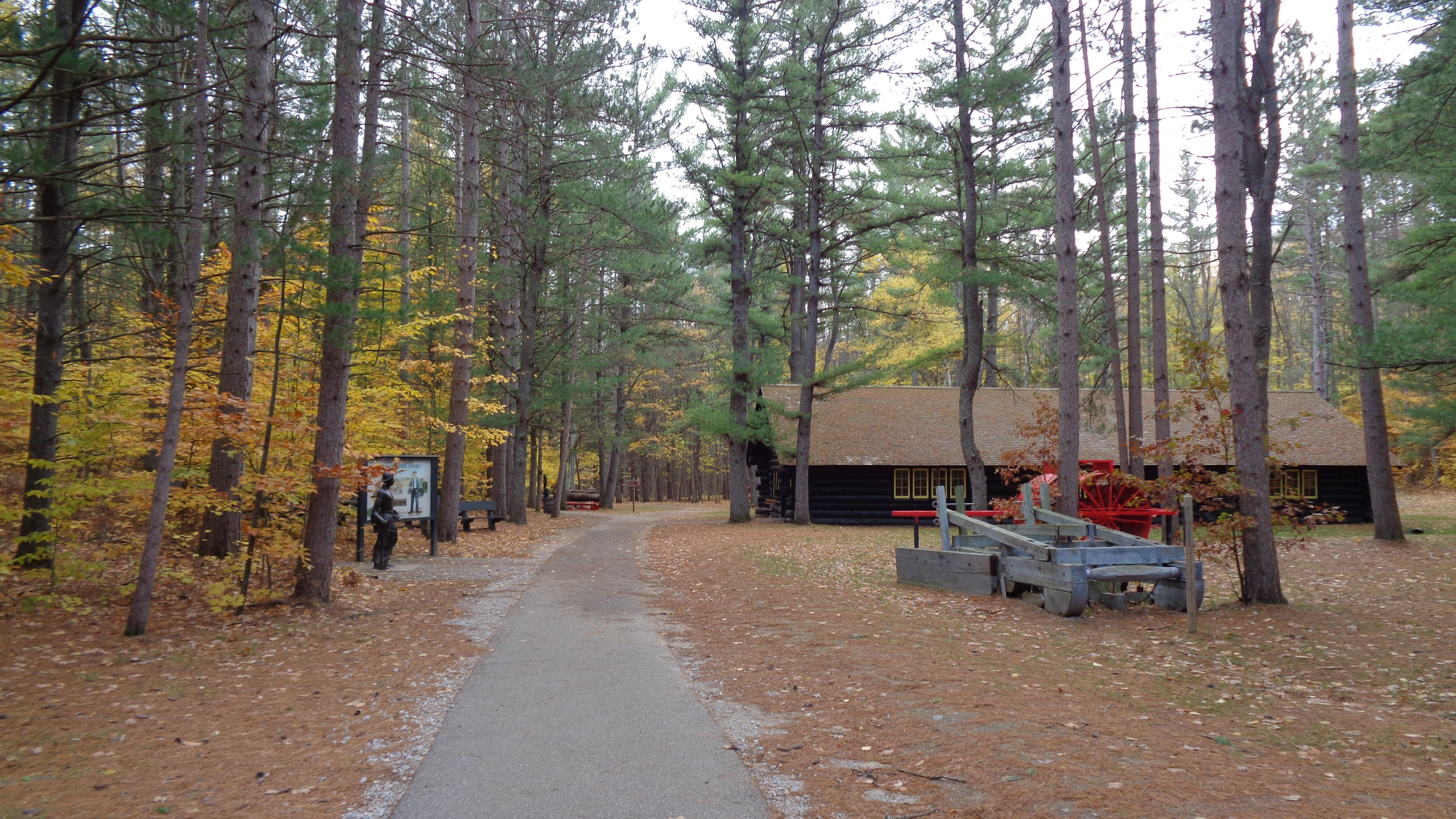
- Hartwick Pines Logging Museum

- Location within Michigan Location within the United States
- Location: Grayling Charter Township, Crawford County, Michigan, United States
- Nearest city: Grayling, Michigan
- Coordinates: 44°44′09″N 84°39′24″W
- Area: 9,338 acres (3,779 ha)
- Elevation: 1,178 feet (359 m)
- Established: 1927
- Administrator: Michigan Department of Natural Resources
- Designation: Michigan state park
- Website: Official website

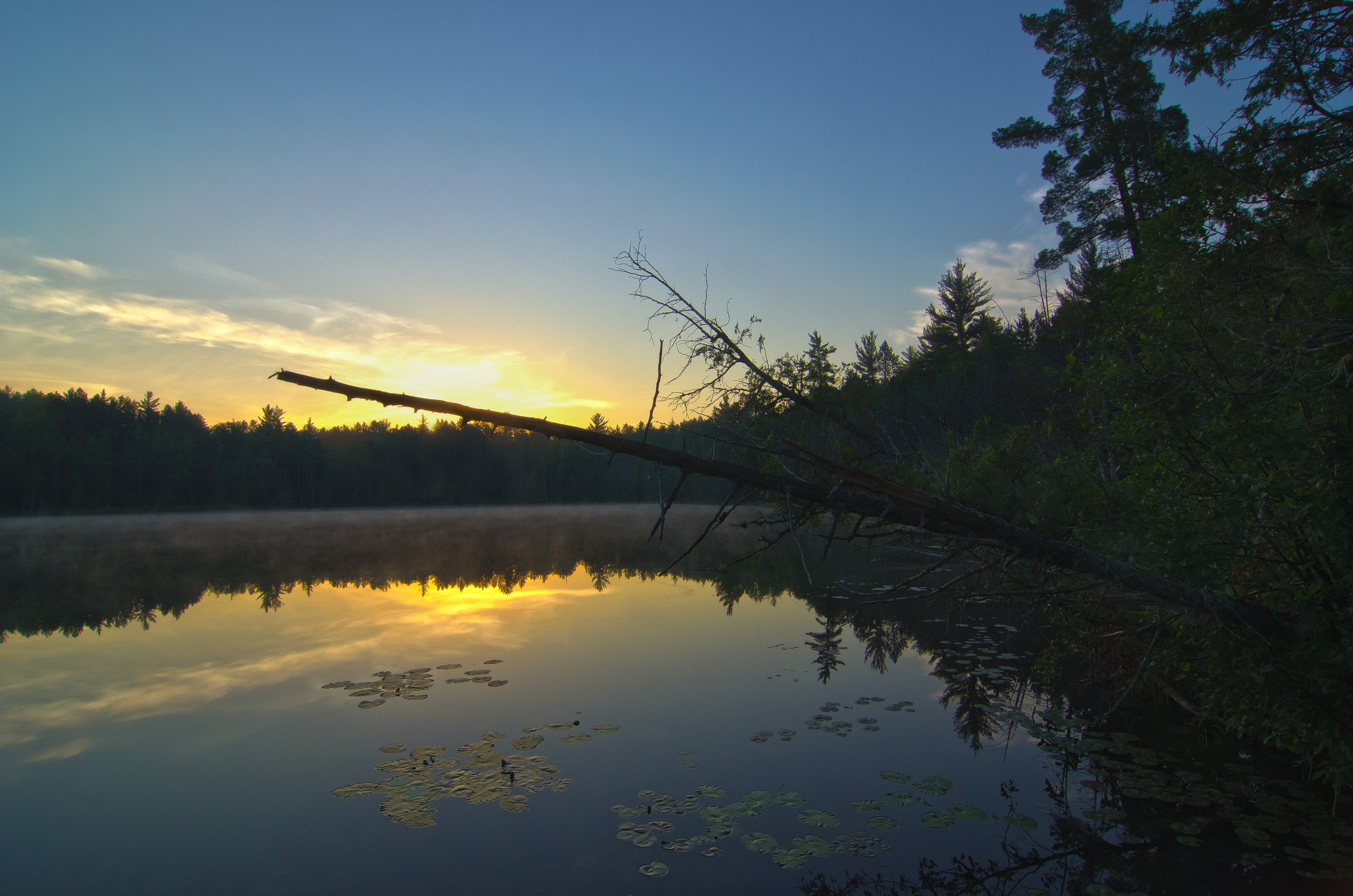
Bright Lake in the park.

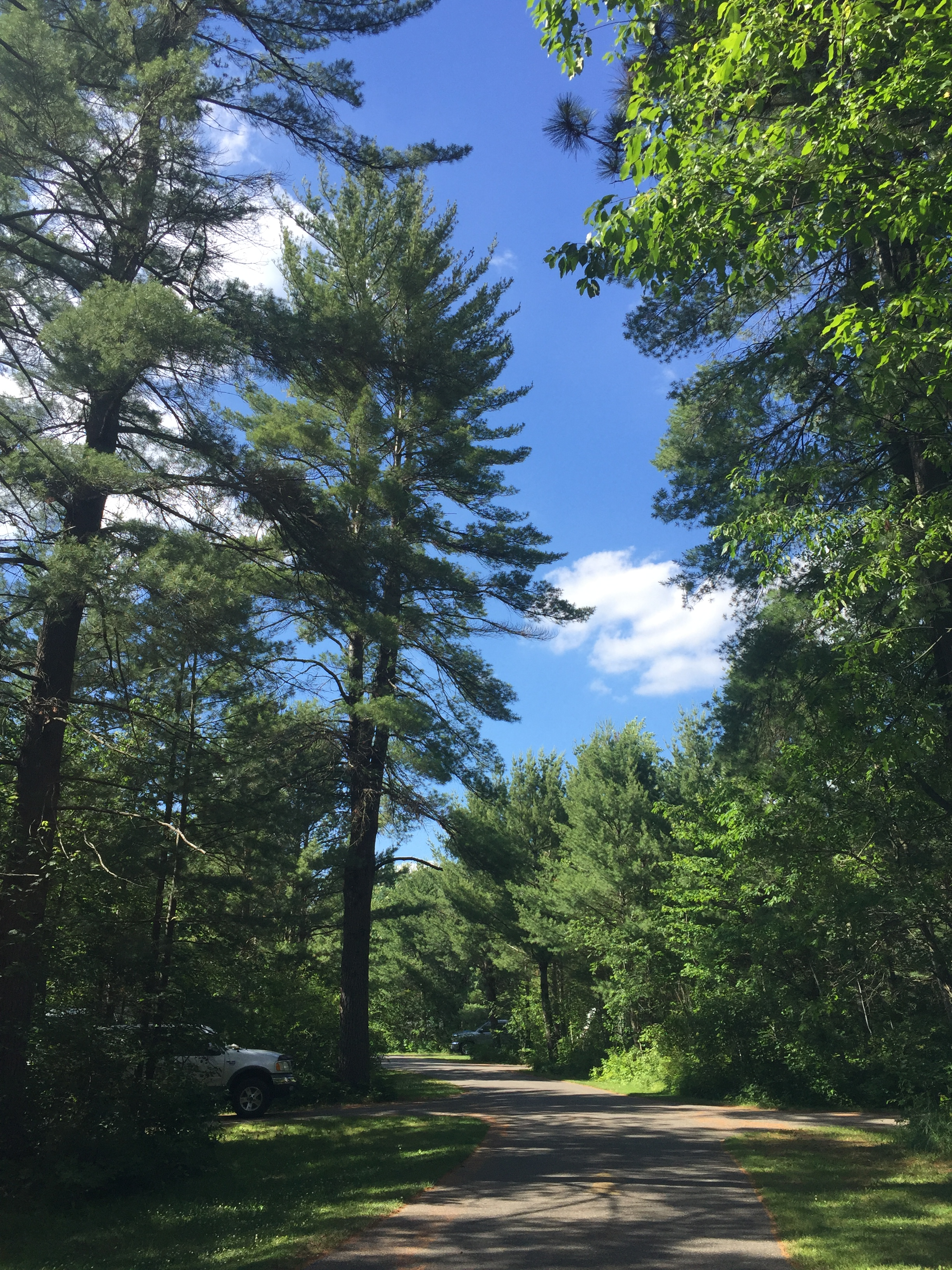
Campground in the park.

Hartwick Pines State Park is a public recreation area covering 9,335 acres (3,778 ha) in Crawford County near Grayling and Interstate 75 on the Lower Peninsula of the U.S. state of Michigan. The state park contains an old-growth forest of white pines and red pines, known as the Hartwick Pines. It is claimed by the Michigan Department of Natural resources that this old growth area, along with the Red Pine Natural Area Preserve in Roscommon County resembles the appearance of all Northern Michigan prior to the logging era. These areas do, however, lack the reoccurring low intensity fires which once occurred throughout northern Michigan, impacting regeneration of red pine and eastern hemlock, as well as leading to an increased content of hardwood species such as sugar maple and beech.

== History ==
The Hartwick Pines are a 49-acre (20 ha) old-growth remnant of a pine grove that was withdrawn from logging by a local timbering firm in 1927—a time when very little old-growth pine remained in northern Michigan. Karen Michelson Hartwick, widow of lumberman Major Edward Hartwick, donated the grove, which was then 85 acres (34 ha) in size, and 8000 surrounding acres (32.4 km^{2}) of cutover land to the state of Michigan as a memorial to the logging industry.

Salling Hansen Lumber Company heavily logged much of the property within Hartwick Pines State Park during the 1880s and 1890s. The Civilian Conservation Corps planted many of the park's trees in the 1930s as part of a massive restoration effort. Hence, this forest is known as "second growth."

On November 11, 1940, the Armistice Day Blizzard badly damaged the Hartwick Pines old-growth pine grove. 36 acres (15 ha) of old trees were destroyed by windthrow from this and other storms, leaving behind the 49 acres (20 ha) that remain.

== Logging museum ==
The Hartwick Pines Logging Museum was erected by the Civilian Conservation Corps (CCC) in 1934–1935. It contains recreated exhibit rooms, photographs and artifacts of the lumber boom years of northern Michigan. The museum is located in two replica logging camp buildings and has outdoor exhibits of logging equipment and an enclosed steam-powered sawmill that is operated during summer events. The museum is administered by the Michigan Department of Natural Resources' Michigan History Museum.

== Activities and amenities ==
The Michigan Forest Visitor Center contains an exhibit hall on the history of the forests in Michigan, an auditorium, classroom space, a bookstore operated by the non-profit Friends of Hartwick Pines, and restrooms. The visitor center has an auditorium that can seat 105 people and a nine-projector multi-image slide show. The show is approximately 14 minutes long and shares the story of logging from past until today. Programs and special events are offered throughout the year.

The state park includes a campground, day-use area, and network of four-season trails for summer hiking and winter cross-country skiing. The Old Growth Forest Trail to the pine grove is a loop 1 1/4 miles (2.0 km) long. The Old Growth Forest is an even-aged stand of pines estimated to be between 350 and 375 years old. The tallest trees are between 150 and 160 feet tall, and have a girth of more than four feet DBH (Diameter at breast height). These eastern white pine are some of the largest trees in the eastern United States. The last remaining virgin maple and beech hardwood forest in the state is at Warren Woods State Park.

There are two foot trails on the south side of M-93. The wooded Au Sable River foot trail is approximately three miles in length and takes hikers across the East Branch at two different locations. The Mertz Grade Trail winds through forest and field for approximately two miles and was named for the early logging railroad spur it shares for a portion of its distance.

There are four small lakes located within the state park. Two of the lakes were originally named Bright and Star Lake. However, there were too many Star Lakes so they settled on Bright and Glory Lake.

== In the news ==
Although changes in drilling technology make drilling for oil and gas possible under historically nonproductive strata in northern Michigan, including sections of state forests, the state of Michigan decided in 2014 not to auction off mineral rights under Hartwick Pines.

== See also ==
- Edward E. Hartwick Memorial Building: a structure within the park.
