= Rolling Hills Memorial Park =

Cemetery in Richmond, Contra Costa County, California

Coordinates: 37°58′19″N 122°18′58″W

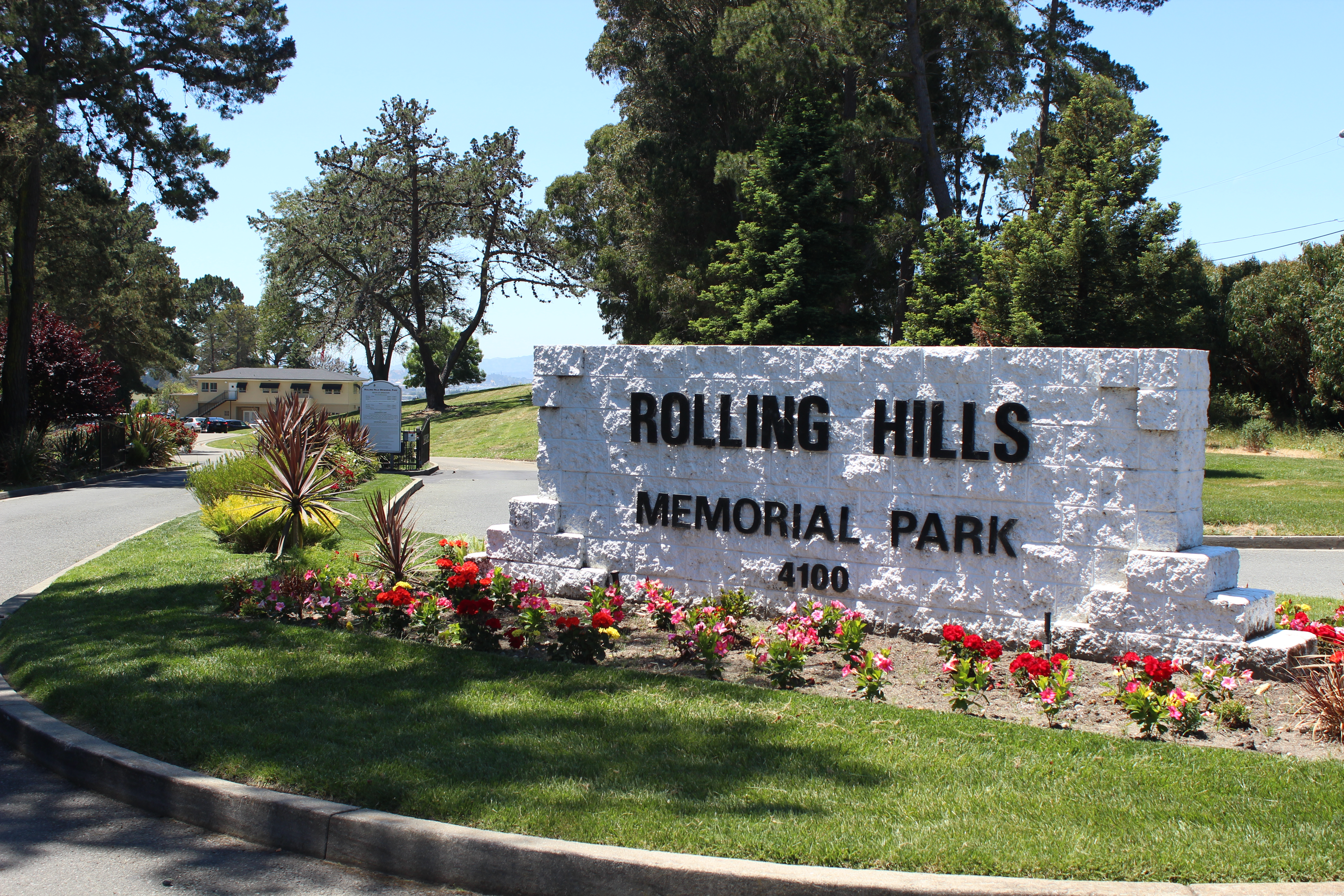
- Front sign of Rolling Hills Memorial Park, in Richmond, California]
- Interactive map of Rolling Hills Memorial Park

Details
- Established: 1960
- Location: Richmond, California
- No. of graves: 50,000 (approximate)

Rolling Hills Memorial Park is a cemetery in Richmond, Contra Costa County, California, established in 1960. The site has approximately 50,000 interments.

== Notable interments ==
- Nicholas Caldwell (1944–2016), Singer
- Proverb Jacobs (1935–2016), Football player
- Joe Morgan (1943–2020), Major League Baseball player
- Louis H. Narcisse (1921–1989), Religious leader
- Nate Oliver (1940–2025), Baseball player
- Vada Pinson (1938–1995), Major League Baseball player
