= Ralph J. Boyd =

The Reverend Ralph J. Boyd Divine King
- Church: Universal Liberty in Christ Truth Kingdom, Inc.
- Installed: 1946
- Term ended: 2006
- Successor: Rev. Naomi Gatlin

Personal details
- Born: Ralph James Joseph Boyd
- Residence: 18150 Joseph Campau Ave, Detroit, Michigan
- Occupation: Pastor

Ralph James Joseph Boyd(1919–2006), also known as the Rev. Ralph J. Boyd, and as Divine King, was a black American religious leader, radio evangelist, faith healer, and pastor who founded and led Universal Liberty In Christ Truth Kingdom, Inc. from 1946 until his death in 2006.

== Early life and mission ==
Ralph James Joseph Boyd was a native of Alabama. He was mentored by Right Reverend James F. Prophet Jones. During the 1940s Rev. Boyd migrated to Detroit with his mentor Prophet Jones. After serving under Prophet Jones, Rev Boyd went on to found Universal Liberty In Christ Truth Kingdom, Inc. in Detroit, Michigan, on August 6, 1946. The Rev. Willie Mae Mullins (1899 - 1994) served as Supreme Queen Mother. Rev. Boyd had prophetic abilities, according to him, he could see, feel and sometimes feel the voice of God. He prophesied Sputnik. At one time he ran a sacristy, boutique, and meditation facility where he meet his followers called the House of Holiness.

Around 1953, Jet Magazine featured him and his assistant minister, Rev. Edith Thompson in an article where local authorities didn't accept his teachings, calling it fortune-telling, while delivering a sermon called, "Doing Good for Others".

== Influence ==
Rev. Boyd's church was the first church in Detroit to host a religious program at Cobo Hall. This was noted in The Detroit tribune., November 26, 1960, under Church News.

In 2021, the Detroit Native Sun, while announcing Universal Liberty in Christ Temple celebrates 75 years of ministry noted that Rev. Boyd broadcast on Sunday nights over WGPR and later WLQV 1500 AM for over 30 years. It was noted that churchgoers and well-wishers flocked to the 7000 East Canfield Street location to participate in live broadcast services.

It was also noted that many famous gospel legends including Shirley Caesar, Mattie Moss Clark, Rev. James Cleveland, Rev. Charles Nicks, the Craig Brothers, and other community, civic, and political leaders took part in services at Universal Liberty in Christ Temple over the span of years.

Rev. Boyd's church's Universal Liberty Radio Choir recorded 2 tracks on a 7-inch format record with Halo Records Detroit entitled He Cares with the church organist, the Rev. Otha Mayfield as a composer. Also the Rev. Willie Sheperd, on the other track entitled, Think Of His Goodness, with Undra McCullum as a composer.

On June 15, 1963, edition of The Detroit tribune, highlighted Rev Boyd's church event called, the "Miss Universal Contest" sponsored by the Matrons Society of Universal Liberty in the Christ Truth Kingdom held on June 7, 1963. Of special note, a photograph shows Rev. Boyd crowning the "queen" winner of the contest, Naomi Albright, a Southwestern graduate along with other runner-ups, Jaunita Watson and Maryln McSCoy.

Bishop Greg Davis in an article of the Christian Beat credited Rev. Ralph Boyd with being one of the biggest musical inspirations on his album Today Is Your Day for a Miracle Vol. I. He stated, “When I was younger, we used to church hop from my grandfather’s church, Bishop Andre Woods at Neopolitan Spiritual Church, Rev. Charles Nicks at St James Missionary Baptist Church, and Universal Kingdom with Rev. Ralph J. Boyd. This sound is what raised me and what I wanted to pay homage to in this album.”

In Dudley Randall, Broadside Press, and the Black Arts Movement in Detroit, 1960-1995 listed Rev Ralph J. Boyd as one of the well-known black national church leaders in the Detroit of the 1960s era along with Rev. Albert Cleage, Prophet Jones, Rev. C. L. Franklin.

In July 1980, the Detroit City Council acknowledged and paid tribute to Rev. Boyd for his religious accomplishments and the church's 32nd National Congress.

His church, Universal Liberty in Christ Temple still meets at 7000 East Canfield St on the corner of Helen in Detroit Michigan where the Rev. Naomi Gatlin, is now pastor also called the Detroit Kingdom. There is also a branch of the church in Cleveland, Ohio pastored by Rev. Dr. Tonya Morah called the Cleveland Kingdom.
