= James G. Walton =

Spiritual Leader

Reverend Lord James G. Walton
- Dominion Executor
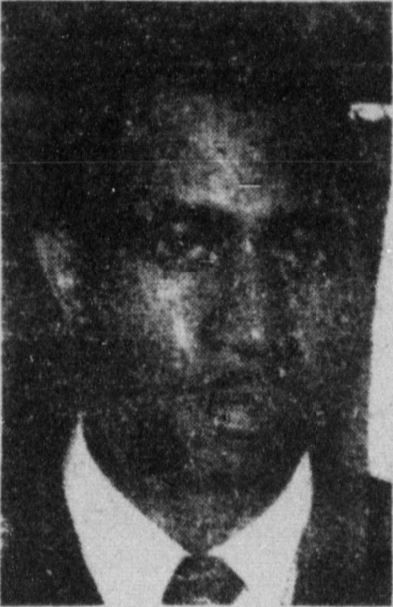
- Church: Church of Universal Triumph, Dominion of God
- Installed: 1944
- Term ended: 1947

Personal details
- Born: James G. Walton; November 9, 1917 Birmingham, Alabama, US
- Died: January 13, 1947 (age 29) Detroit, Michigan

James G. Walton (November 9, 1917 – January 13, 1947), also known as the Rev. Lord James G. Walton and as Elder James Walton, was a black American pentecostal spiritual denominational leader, minister, missionary, church organizer, and writer who assisted Prophet Jones in the development of Church of Universal Triumph, Dominion of God, Inc. from 1938 until his death in 1947.

== Early life and education ==
Reverend James Walton was born in Birmingham, Alabama on November 9, 1917. His mother was Mary L. Walton. He attended Parker High School in Birmingham.

== Career ==
Reverend Walton teamed up with Prophet Jones on October 16, 1934, shortly after he had dropped out of high school. At the time Prophet Jones was an evangelist for the Triumph Kingdom of God Prayer Band. In 1935, James Walton and Prophet Jones went to St Louis, Missouri. There he assisted Prophet Jones in conducting meetings. From there he and Prophet Jones traveled to Chattanooga, Atlanta, and then Detroit. In 1938, James Walton and Prophet Jones established a prayer band in Detroit. In 1945 when Prophet Jones left the Triumph the Church, the Kingdom of God in Christ organization, James Walton left with him becoming a charter member of Prophet Jones's new organization called Universal Triumph, the Dominion of God church.

He was a church organizer, helping to organize thankful centers with Prophet Jones in Missouri, Alabama, Tennessee, Colorado, Ohio, Chicago, and California. He was responsible for writing and publishing many of the rituals, pamphlets, and booklets of Prophet Jones's teachings. He also acted as business manager, private secretary, international general recording secretary, dominion executor, and diocesan administrator of the California district of Universal Triumph, the Dominion of God church. As Dominion Executor he was chairman of the Dominion Council, the chief governing body of the church.

Rev. Walton was known as a dapper dresser, who dressed exactly like Prophet Jones. He was a constant companion of Prophet Jones. He was known as the young man who carried the money bag. During the early 1940's Rev. Walton also called Elder Walton could be seen in LIFE magazine seated at the dining table inside Dominion parsonage with Prophet Jones, Lady Catherine, and Joshua adopted son of Prophet Jones.

== Death ==
Rev Walton died at 3 am on the Monday of January 13, 1947, at the age of 29 at Grace Hospital from a kidney ailment after a weeklong illness. Funeral services were held for him at Thankful Center No. 1, on Thursday, January 23, 1947, at 12 pm at 1169 Hague St Detroit, Michigan. Arrangements were made for his body to be shipped to Birmingham, Alabama, for burial.

Prophet Jones declared following the funeral services that he would issue a proclamation declaring November 9 as a holiday to be observed by all of his followers.

Religious titles
Preceded by none	Dominion Executor of the Church of Universal Triumph, Dominion of God, Inc. 1944–1947	Succeeded by Prince Douglas Rodgers
