= Edward Hartwick =

American soldier and businessman

Edward Edgar Hartwick
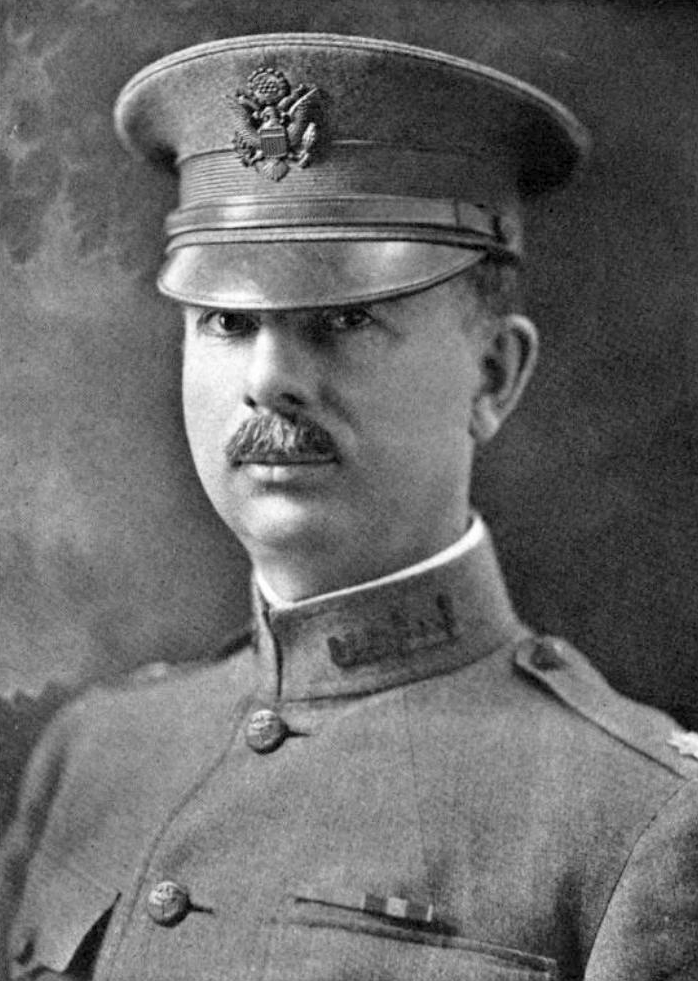
- Born: September 6, 1871; St. Louis, Michigan
- Died: March 31, 1918 (aged 46) near Bordeaux, France
- Burial place: Woodlawn Cemetery
- Military career
- Allegiance: United States
- Branch: United States Army
- Service years: 1893–1899, 1917–1918
- Rank: Major
- Unit: 9th U.S. Cavalry
- Conflicts: Spanish–American War; World War I

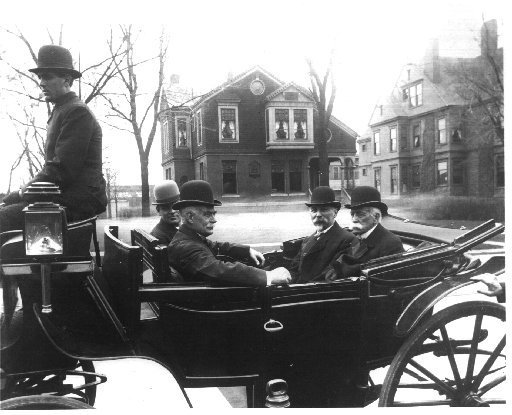
Edward Hartwick (2nd from left) with dignitaries attend the construction site of Saginaw's City Auditorium on South Washington and Janes in 1908. From left to right: Unknown (driver), Edward Hartwick, William S. Linton (congressman), Mayor William B. Baum, Wellington R. Burt (businessman).

Edward Edgar Hartwick (September 6, 1871 – March 31, 1918) was an American soldier, businessman and namesake of Hartwick Pines State Park in the state of Michigan.

== Family ==
Hartwick was born in St. Louis, Michigan, on September 6, 1871, to Michael Shoat and Jane Augusta (Obear) Hartwick. Among his ancestors was a brother of John Christopher Hartwick, a Lutheran minister who emigrated to the United States from Germany in the early decades of the 18th century. Hartwick, New York, and Hartwick Seminary, now Hartwick College, were named after him.

== Military career ==
Hartwick's family moved to Michigan and he graduated from Grayling High School in 1888. A year later, in September 1889, Hartwick left Michigan to enroll at the United States Military Academy at West Point. He graduated with high honors in 1893. Upon completing his schooling, he was appointed a second lieutenant in the 4th Cavalry and, shortly thereafter, transferred to the 9th Cavalry Regiment, nicknamed the Buffalo Soldiers. He was to remain in the West until the outbreak of the Spanish–American War was to take him and the 9th to Cuba.

The following report was officially submitted following the action of July 1, 1898, before San Juan Hill.

The country is covered with dense undergrowth and great caution had to be exercised to avoid being ambushed by the enemy. In this connection much credit is due 2nd Lieutenant Hartwick, 9th Cavalry, who conducted the movements of the 'point' and 'flankers' in the advance. Lieutenant Hartwick pushed steadily forward until he was fired on by the enemy and directed by me to halt. This officer displayed great coolness in a very trying and dangerous position. During the assault and throughout the entire day, by his courage and prompt action, I was enabled to get the best result from the troop. I recommend him for consideration.

An interesting account of the Battle of San Juan Hill appears in Hartwick's biography in which he is quoted as saying, among things, "The above claim of Colonel Roosevelt is not true": The claim had to do with exactly when and how and why Teddy Roosevelt "led" the charge up San Juan Hill.

== Private life ==
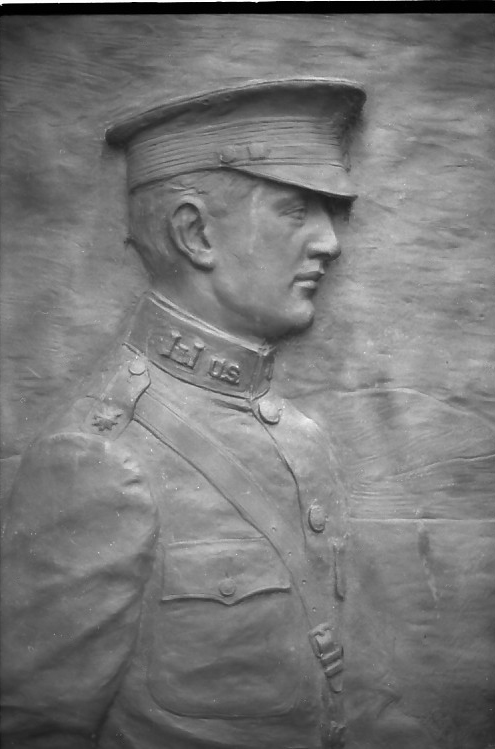
Edward Hartwick by sculptor Julius Loester in Woodlawn Cemetery, Detroit

Hartwick left Cuba to return to Grayling and on October 19, 1898, married Karen Bessie Michelson. He resigned his commission effective July 1899. He became engaged in the lumber and banking industries in Grayling and soon prospered, eventually moving to Detroit.

He was a 32d degree Mason, having been a member of Jackson Lodge, No. 17, F. & A. M., Jackson Chapter, No. 3, R. A. M., Detroit Commandery, No. 1, K. T., Moslem Temple, A. A. O. N. M. S., of Detroit, and the Michigan Sovereign Consistory, Valley of Detroit, Michigan. Major Hartwick's clubs were: the Detroit Athletic Club, the Ingleside Club, Detroit Golf Club, Bankers' Club of Detroit, Fellowcraft Athletic Club, and the Detroit Automobile Club. He held membership with the National Association of Real Estate Exchanges, Detroit Real Estate Board, Detroit Board of Commerce, Detroit Real Estate Exchange, Exchange Club, Detroit Y. M. C. A., American National Red Cross, Detroit Retail Lumber Dealers' Association, Milwaukee Junction Manufacturers' Association, and was president and director of the Michigan State Retailers' Lumber Association.

== Return to the military ==
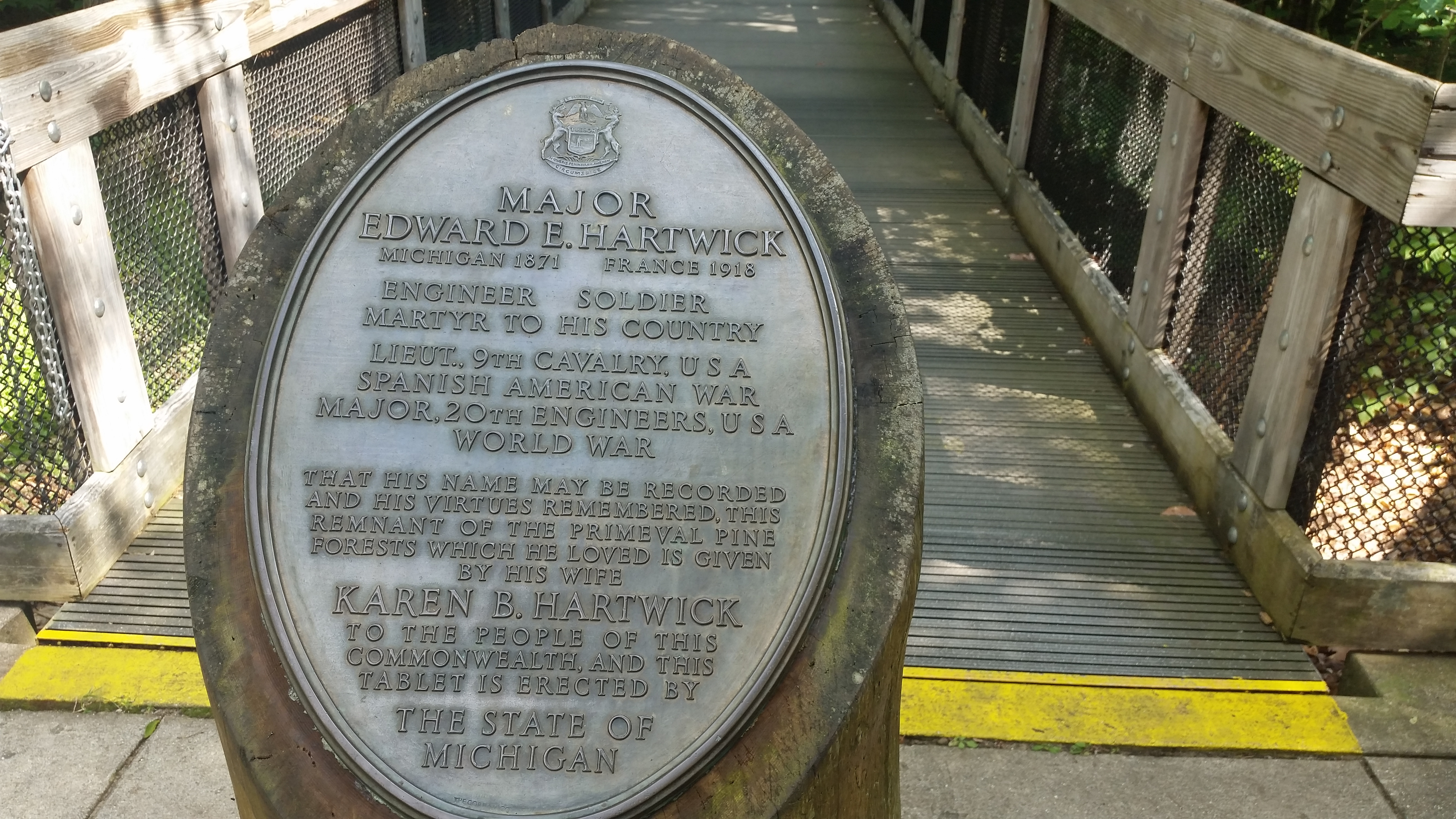
Edward Hartwick memorial plaque at the entrance of Hartwick Pines State Park

Following the United States' entry into World War I Hartwick volunteered for service and was commissioned a major in the 20th Engineers. He sailed to Europe in November 1917. In March 1918, Hartwick became ill with meningitis and on March 31, 1918, at age 46, he died near Bordeaux, France. He was buried in Talence Cemetery "with full military honors."

On December 23, 1920, his remains were removed to Woodlawn Cemetery in Detroit. Ten months later, in October 1921, a bronze monument was erected there in his honor.

In 1927, his widow, Karen Hartwick, purchased more than 8,000 acres (32.4 km^{2}) of land, including the last 85 acres (34.4 ha) of virgin pine in the Lower Peninsula of Michigan. Shortly afterwards, she donated the parcel to the state of Michigan in her husband's name. Thus Hartwick Pines State Park, the largest state park in the Lower Peninsula of Michigan, was named in his honor. The Edward E. Hartwick Memorial Building museum within the park is listed on the National Register of Historic Places.
