= James Shaffer (pastor) =

American religious leader (1910–2014)

The Reverend Lord James Shaffer
- Dominion Ruler & President
- Church: Church of Universal Triumph, Dominion of God, Inc.
- Appointed: 1971
- Installed: 1971
- Term ended: 2014
- Predecessor: James F. Jones (minister) ("Prophet Jones")

Personal details
- Born: James Shaffer; February 14, 1910
- Died: March 9, 2014 (aged 104)
- Spouse: Wyoming Shaffer (m. ?); Maggie Boatmon-Shaffer (m. 1995–2014)
- Occupation: Pastor

James Shaffer (February 14, 1910 – March 9, 2014) was an American religious leader, and pastor who led the Church of Universal Triumph, Dominion of God, Inc. after the death of James F. Jones in 1971.

== Beginnings ==
James Shaffer was born February 14, 1910, in Money, Mississippi, as the youngest of 16 children born to Jeff and Elmira Shaffer.

== Meeting and following Jones ==
Shaffer and his first wife, Wyoming Shaffer, moved to Detroit in 1943. Once they arrived, they decided to attend a meeting of Triumph the Church and Kingdom of God in Christ to hear James F. Jones, known as Prophet Jones, speak.

== Next Dominion Ruler succeeding Prophet Jones ==
Shaffer became a leading minister in the Church of Universal Triumph, Dominion of God, Inc., eventually serving as leader of the Detroit Headquarters' church, Universal Thankful Center #1, and assistant to Jones. In time Jones, ailing in health, asked Shaffer to "carry his torch". On Jones's death in 1971, Shaffer succeeded him as 'Dominion ruler'.

In 1995, at the age of 85, Shaffer married long time Universal Triumph member Maggie Boatmon. The new Mrs. Shaffer then became the new 1st Dominion Lady, in succession to Catherine L. Jones, the late James Jones's mother, who had been 1st Lady from the founding of the Dominion until her death in 1951.

In 2010, Shaffer celebrated his 100th birthday.

The church reported on, "March 9, 2014 we lost our beloved leader Rev. Lord James Shaffer as he left the physical body to a higher spiritual plane. He is greatly missed by his family and the spiritual community that he was so long a part of. He made this transition after turning 104 years young on Feb. 13, 2014. "Well done my good and faithful servant" Matt. 25:21."

Religious titles
Preceded by James F. Jones (minister)	Dominion Ruler of the Church of Universal Triumph, Dominion of God; 1971–2014	Succeeded by Rev. Lord Gregory Ramsey
