= James F. Jones (minister) =

American minister

The Right Reverend James F. Jones (Prophet Jones)
- Dominion Ruler
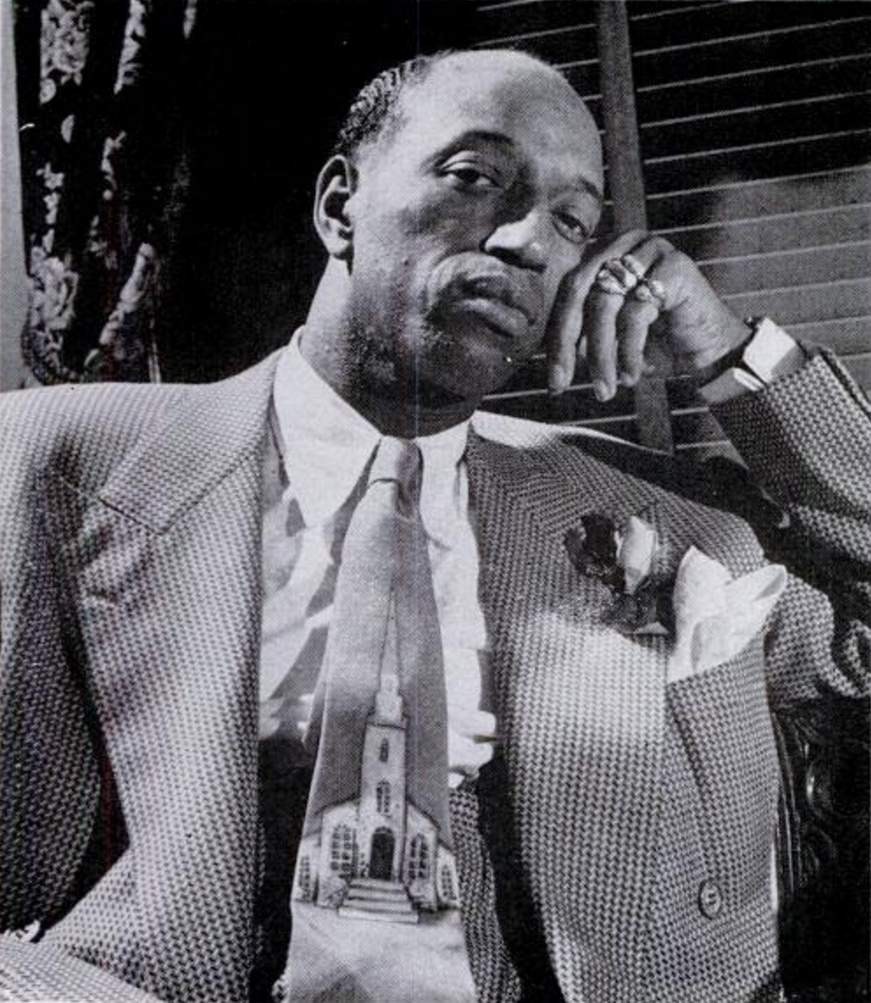
- Prophet Jones wearing a double-breasted cut zoot-suit and $100 hand-painted cravat with ecclesiastical motif, 1944
- Church: Church of Universal Triumph, Dominion of God
- Installed: 1944
- Term ended: 1971
- Successor: James Schaffer (pastor)

Personal details
- Born: James Francis Marion Jones; November 24, 1907 Birmingham, Alabama, U.S.
- Died: August 12, 1971 (aged 63) Detroit, Michigan, U.S.
- Buried: Woodlawn Cemetery, Detroit
- Denomination: Christian
- Residence: 246 Ferry Ave., 75 Arden Park, 8311 La Salle Blvd., Detroit
- Parents: James W. Jones; Catherine L. Jones
- Children: Joshua(1938–?); David(1948–?); Annie(1946–?); James(1951–?)
- Occupation: Evangelist, Faith healer, Pastor, Recording Artist
- Motto: All is well!

James Francis Marion Jones (November 24, 1907 – August 12, 1971), also known as Prophet Jones, was an American black religious leader, televangelist, faith healer and pastor who led the religious movement that developed into the Church of Universal Triumph, Dominion of God, Inc. from 1938 until his death in 1971.

As "Prophet Jones", James F. Jones claimed and his followers ascribed to him, divine powers from God as a special premillennial "incarnation of the spirit of Jesus Christ". Jones was a contemporary of other religious leaders at that time including Daddy Grace, Father Divine, C. L. Franklin, Charles Harrison Mason and Elijah Muhammad.

Jones came to Detroit as a missionary for the southern-based Pentecostal sect, Triumph the Church and Kingdom of God in Christ. He thus led two of the largest predominantly black Pentecostal churches in Detroit during the 1940s and 1950s. He broadcast live weekly sermons over Canadian stations CKLW reaching the Midwest. In 1955 he began hosting Sunday night programs on WXYZ-TV, making him the first black preacher in Detroit to host a weekly television program. He was well known for his late-night services, which were broadcast in Detroit. Jones died at 63 years old and was buried at Woodlawn Cemetery in Detroit.

== Early life and mission ==
James Francis Marion Jones was born in Birmingham, Alabama on November 24, 1907. His father, a railroad brakeman named James W. Jones, married a schoolteacher named Catherine Lewis. He was their only child. In 1912 the five-year-old James F. Jones joined and began preaching sermons in Triumph the Holy Righteous Church. The Triumph the Holy Righteous Church was a Black Nationalist/Pentecostal church founded by Father Elias Dempsey Smith in 1902 that Jones' parents, former members of the African Methodist Episcopal Church, converted to. Young Jones preached in the tents, convocations and other venues of the early Triumph Church as a child prodigy.

In 1915, Triumph the Holy Righteous Church changed its name to Triumph the Church and Kingdom of God in Christ. Its leader, Father Smith, was anointed Holy Apostle, Priest and King of the Triumph the Church and Kingdom of God. Smith claimed, and his followers believed, that he was divinely inspired to found and lead the Triumph Church and that God spoke directly to him. Jones in 1944, thirty years later, started a similar church called the Church of Universal Triumph, Dominion of God, in Detroit, wherein he and his teachings would both emulate and supplant those of Father Smith amongst his own followers.

In 1917 at eleven years old, Jones quit school. He spent his life evangelizing, preaching, prophesying and pasturing in the Triumph cause, as he understood and eventually reinterpreted it. As an adult Jones said when he was a little boy God spoke to him and told him he was destined to "distil" great and good thoughts in the minds of men.

In 1924 Jones, popularly called "sonny" and "son", became an officially ordained minister in the Southern-based Triumph the Church and Kingdom of God in Christ at age 18. Jones rose steadily within the Triumph Church after becoming a fully accredited officer. By the 1930s he attained the status of a "Prince" inside the Triumph Church hierarchy.

== Triumph Church ministry and the formation of a new church ==
In 1938 the expanding Triumph sect sent Jones, accompanied by his adolescent personal secretary James G. Walton, to Detroit as a missionary. Jones, had traveled extensively on Triumph Church business for many years without 'purse or script' in such states as Missouri, Tennessee and Georgia. In Detroit Jones began a radio ministry. He hosted a weekly radio hour on a Canadian station, CKLW, that reached across several midwestern states. It was around this time that he became known to the public by the title in which he became famous, "Prophet Jones". He would go on to become the first African American preacher in Detroit to host a weekly television program that was telecasted every Sunday at 11 p.m on WXYZ-TV.

The national Triumph Church claimed that gifts and offerings to Jones' ministry were rightfully its property. Jones disagreed and soon thereafter broke away from the Triumph Church to embark on forming his own group that he named 'Church of Universal Triumph, Dominion of God'.

Jones proclaimed that the split with Triumph was purely for spial reasons as around this time he received word from God to manifest the Kingdom with himself as Prophet and Ruler preaching the "true gospel". According to the Church of Universal Triumph, Dominion of God web-site, the command to form the organization was revealed to "Prophet" Jones, September 24, 1944, by the God of the universe supported by the scriptures, citing Rev. 11:15; 18:1–4; 21:1–5; Matthew 6:8,10, and Amos 3:7.

== Leadership of Universal Triumph Dominion of God ==
In 1944, Jones formed his new corporation, called the Church of Universal Triumph, Dominion of God, in Detroit.

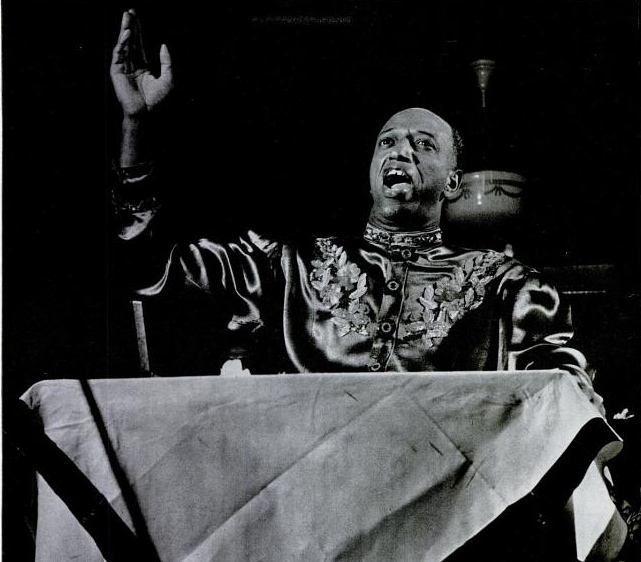
Prophet Jones preaching in November 1944

After breaking with the national Triumph Church, the new Universal Triumph the Dominion of God started in the Black Bottom area of Detroit. From a small frame church building Jones' following was moved to larger headquarters at the old Oriole Theater at 8450 Linwood Avenue in 1953. This large building is now New Bethel Baptist Church and was once pastored by C. L. Franklin, a former friend and later rival of Jones. This rivalry stemmed from Franklin characterizing Jones as "a setback of hundreds of years" to integration. Universal Triumph the Dominion of God later moved from the Oriole Theater and held services above the Fine Arts Theater at 2940 Woodward before finding a permanent home of worship at 1651 Ferry Park.

In a religious subculture of competing claims, Jones declared that the almighty God spoke solely to him and that he was the second coming of Christ and thus was the world's 'one and only true prophet' and savior. As such he was God's 'Holiness' and sole 'Divine messenger' on Earth 'in these last days' with the divine powers to forecast, heal, bless and condemn.

As the Universal Dominion Ruler, Jones presided over the Dominion services from a throne atop a raised, canopied dais on an elevated stage in front of the people. He gave his inner circle royal titles such as sir, prince, princess, lord, and lady. He called his flock the "citizens" of his dominion. He taught them his 'true gospel' from the Holy Bible in light of his 'divine revelation'.

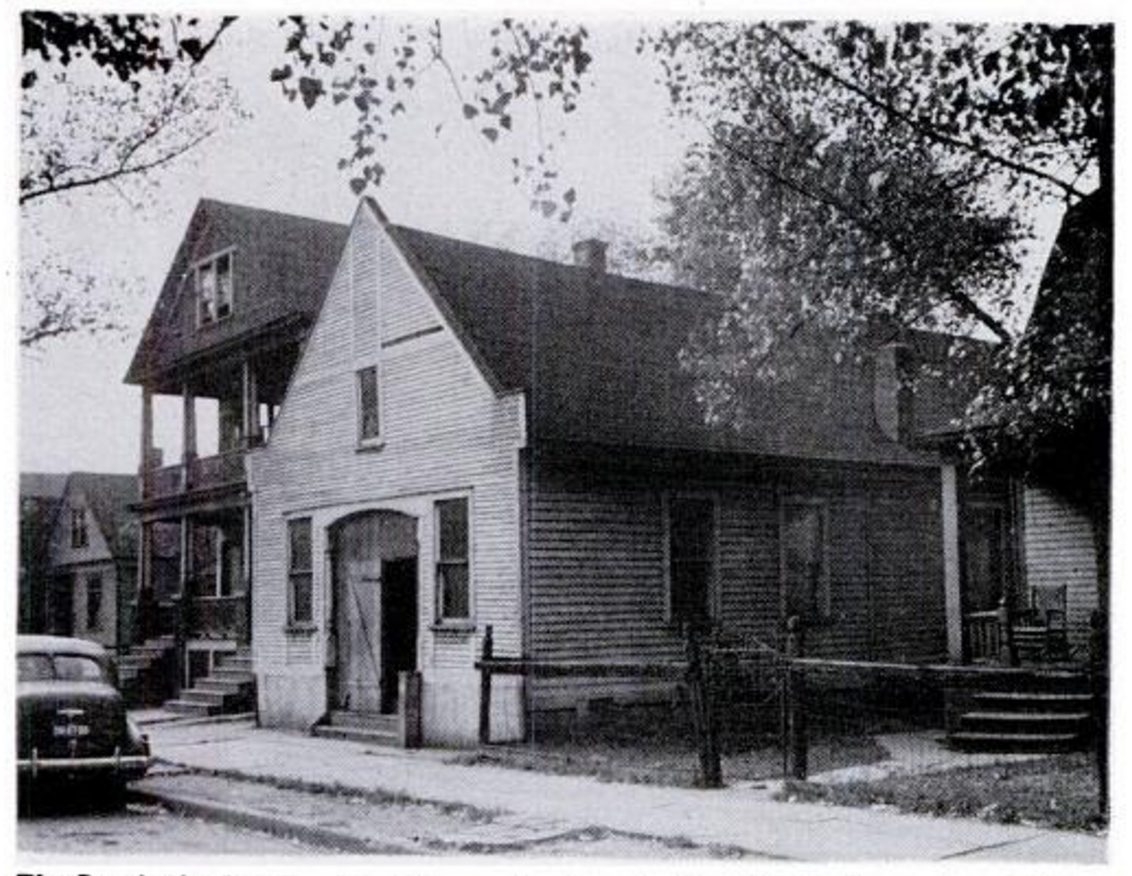
Universal Triumph the Dominion of God church

Many of these teachings are found in the Dominion publications: The al, The Message, The Mind Awakener, and the Dominion Constitution. His teachings revolved around him heralding God's incoming 'New World' of 'perfect bliss', in which the wicked would be destroyed but the faithful would live for ever in incorruptible physical bodies. He claimed those that are faithful now could have heaven on earth by recognizing his 'divine' calling and obeying his 'divine' wisdom and rules.

He held the belief that at least parts of the Bible were antiheterosexual, such as his interpretation of the book of Genesis. He taught that in the story of Adam and Eve, it wasn't the apple that was the "forbidden fruit", but rather it was Eve, and that the cohabitation of men and women violated God.

In return, the citizens were to obey his Dominion rules, attend his weekly all-night ecstatic worship services, publicly testify to belief in his faith healing powers, celebrate his birthday, called Philamethyu, in lieu of Christmas and make gifts to him as tokens of their thanks, love, faith and devotion. Furthermore, social clubs, drinks like coffee and alcohol, and unmarried parenthood were not allowed.

The Dominion consisted of numerous churches called "Thankful Centers" around the United States and elsewhere. In a newspaper interview in 1953, Jones claimed about thirty-five churches and six million followers eventually belonged to or were 'registered into' his Dominion. Detroit's membership, called Thankful Center #1, was claimed to be about 1,500.

== Arrest ==
Jones was arrested on a morals charge by an undercover Detroit policeman in 1956. Confidential magazine and Whisper magazine discussed his "queerness" that was not printed by mainstream newspapers. Jones was acquitted, but never regained his stature.

== Residences ==
Jones lived the life of a millionaire. The first of his three Detroit parsonages was a three-story, multiroom mansion at 246 Ferry Avenue and was described as "luxurious" in an article in The Detroit News of July 2, 1944.

This mansion is located in the East Ferry Avenue Historic District and was formerly the Fritz Funeral Home, one of the oldest black-owned firms of this type in Detroit. When Prophet Jones obtained the mansion, he operated it as a rooming house for twelve couples.

This home is a large, elegant structure which consists of three floors and a basement. The third floor was a dance hall and entertainment room, with high ceilings and hardwood floors. The second floor included bedrooms and quarters for the maid. The first floor had a large living room, a dining room and a sun room.

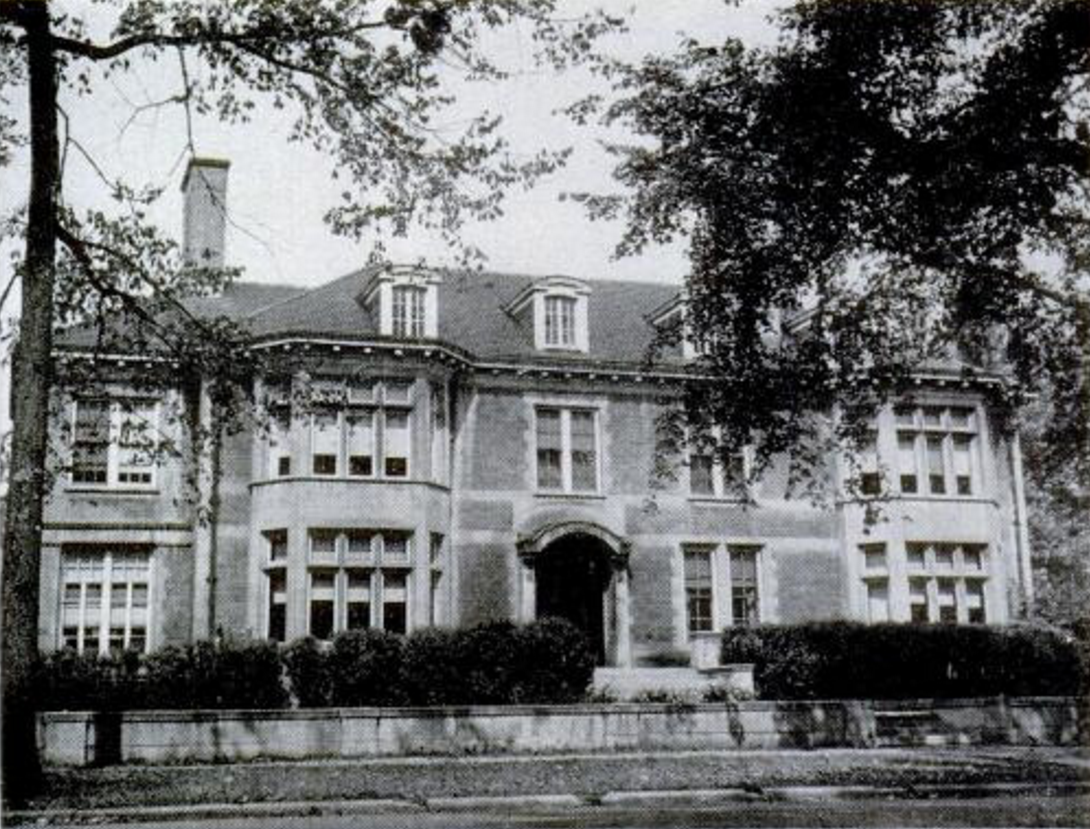
Prophet Jones' "French Castle"

The second mansion was his Arden Park-East Boston Historic District parsonage and it was even larger than the first mansion and it was also claimed to be 'opulent' in the press. Aretha Franklin recalled as a child loving this Detroit mansion, which Jones painted a different color throughout the year. Prophet Jones called this mansion the "French Castle". It was also known as the "Dominion Residence". According to Hue magazine the Arden Park Dominion parsonage was previously a fifty-four-room former gambling casino, which Jones purchased from gambler Danny Sullivan. According to Ebony the house was purchased by his flock at reported cost at that time, $30,000. The house had been previously built in 1917 by General Motors Corporation executive Edmund A. Vier for $100,000. The house was styled after an 18th-century French chateau.

The interior of the home was hand-carved woodwork, gold-painted ceilings, ornate brocade drapes and wall-to-wall carpeting with pile as deep as an English lawn. The home was also furnished with various exquisite furnishings, many of which were gifts from congregants and other well-wishers. Some of these gifts, such as a $7,000 grand piano, $8,000 worth of silver plate, a stained glass window installed at a cost of $1,200 and other rooms of expensive furniture, were so opulent that reports stated that 'they awed visitors'. A massive double door guarded the front entrance to the mansion, and Dominion security inspected visitors carefully through a glass panel before unlocking it. It was also reported in the press that of all of Jones' possessions, he cherished his expansive wardrobe of almost five hundred expensive matching suits and ties, exotic, colorful and bejeweled robes and ensembles, some foreign imported, others tailor-made specifically for him.

Jones received visitors to the 'French castle' parsonage in a small paneled study, dominated by a life-size portrait of himself in a white robe. In a report in The Detroit News it was reported that the room was stiflingly hot because a gas fire burned in the fireplace twenty-four hours a day. When asked why this was so, the report stated Jones said that God had told him never to let the fire go out. The report also stated that children's toys were observed aligned along the fireplace of the study. Jones stated, when asked, that they were meant to symbolize "the lack of toys" in his own "impoverished boyhood". His childhood was also disconnected from traditional masculine hobbies or experiences growing up. He had stated that he had never held a baseball bat, nor played with marbles.

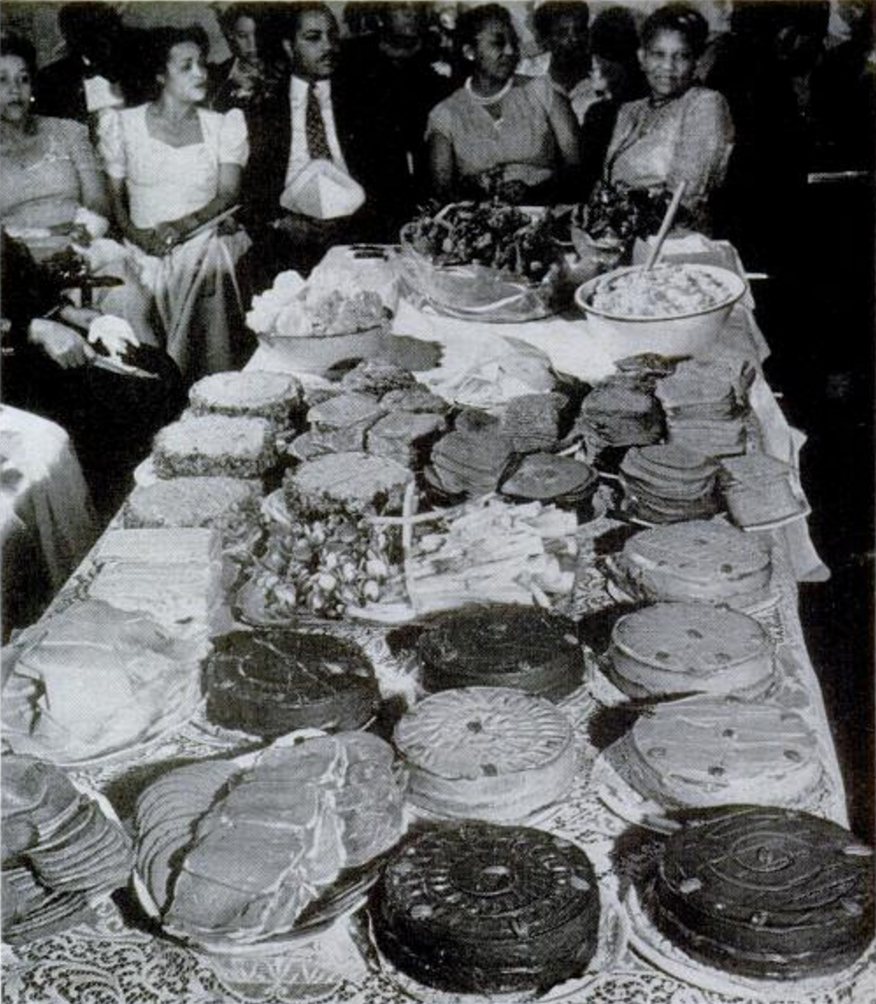
One of Prophet Jones' feasts

Jones employed a personal staff of twelve domestic servants who were financed by the Dominion. His cooks went everywhere with him. "A great person preaching the unadulterated gospel has to be careful", he said. Jones alleged that the founder of the Triumph Church, Father Smith, had died in 1920 after being poisoned by adversaries. Later Jones sold his "French Castle" to rival Daddy Grace. This left him with his third large residence at 8311 La Salle Blvd, Detroit. This home continues to serves as the current Detroit Dominion parsonage.

At his Arden Park home in the 1950s Jones hosted lavish eight-day-long birthday banquets, called Philamethyu and Hushdomcalama in his honor that were much covered in the press. Michigan governor G. Mennon Williams and Detroit mayor Albert Cobo sent him birthday greetings in 1954. Prominent African Americans from the elite of politics, business, sports, entertainment and music such as Lionel Hampton and his wife Gladys Hampton attended the birthday banquets and other gatherings held in the Sky Room.

In addition to his high level parties and celebrations at his Arden Park parsonage the press also covered Jones's visit to Father Divine at his Pennsylvanian estate in 1953. Jones was also friendly with C. L. Franklin for some time. In addition to being interviewed by the likes of Burt Lancaster, a local Detroit TV reporter, Jones also employed his own press agent, Ulysses W. Boykin, the owner of the Detroit Tribune newspaper and a former staff aide to boxer Joe Louis. Another aide of Jones, Ophelia Kemp, was the mother of Hollywood actress Freda Rentie. Jones attended the famous singer Dinah Washington's funeral, and was classified as a mourner in the Jet 1964 issue.

== Death ==
Jones died of a heart attack at 63 years old on August 12, 1971, at the Dominion parsonage on La Salle Blvd in Detroit under the care of a church "prince", "Lord" Claude Haley. At the time of his death, according to contemporary accounts in Jet magazine, church leaders were trying to design a crypt to place his body near his mother's at Elmwood Cemetery in Detroit.

On August 17, 1971, over 4,000 people attended Prophet Jones viewing at Swanson Funeral Home, 806 E. Grand Blvd., Detroit. It was also reported that cars jammed the intersection and the front of the funeral home as the line of viewers stretched out to the street by the late afternoon. Plans for the funeral service were described as being lively and reminiscent of when Jones packed crowds into his churches at the Oriole movie theater and the Fine Arts movie theater at 2940 Woodward. The funeral service would also include Jones's ladies and princesses dressed in white dancing and shouting with tambourines. The funeral was planned to be two services, the first a lively memorial service planned by his followers to be held August 18, 1971 at 7:30 pm and a traditional rite with celebrities at 10:00 am on August 19, 1971, at the Adlai Stevenson Building Auditorium on 10100 Grand River. He was to be temporarily buried inside a crypt at Woodlawn Cemetery, Woodward and Eight Mile.

Jones had 15,000 people pay their last respects to him. More than 2,000 people, some from as far away as Canada and the Caribbean came to his funeral, which was held at the Adlai Stevenson Building Auditorium on Grand River. Over 20 Universal Dominion ministers from 36 states and the West Indies took part in and officiated at the funeral services. There was an eight-man honor guard that surrounded Prophet Jones's coffin. The funeral was described as growing into a free for all dance arena after Rev. Maggie Boatmon split into a dance down the center aisle, with funeral attendees joining in singing, dancing, clapping, and swaying. The pastor and famed gospel singer, Reverend Louis H. Narcisse of California, also traveled to Detroit to attend the funeral.

Jones was buried at Detroit's Woodlawn Cemetery in his silver embroidered robe, in a bronze coffin which had had his signature white mink coat placed on it during the services.

== Succession ==
Pastor James Shaffer, an assistant to Jones who was 61 at the time of his death, became Jones' most logical successor. After a vote the Dominion Council and the Dominion Board of Trustees installed James Shaffer as the new 'Dominion ruler' and successor to Jones as leader of Church of Universal Triumph, Dominion of God.

== Legacy ==
- Johnathan Walton of Watch This! explained, "Whether Jones was a healer or not his place in popular culture in the 1950s was indisputable. This self-proclaimed seer and radio evangelist was favorably featured in such publications as Ebony magazine, Time magazine, Life magazine, Newsweek, and The Saturday Evening Post.
- In the 1940s and 1950s Prophet Jones had mass acclaim, affluence, and influence in the black religious landscape in many cities.
- Images of Prophet Jones in magazines & on television in 1955 sitting on his throne, with gold jeweled fingers and wrist, draped in an ankle-length white mink coat atop sparkling robes may have aesthetically impacted the likes of Rev. Ike and gospel singer 'King' Solomon Burke of Philadelphia the former twenty years old and the latter sixteen at the time, as well as others. Some, like Bishop King Louis H. Narcisse of Mt. Zion's Spial Temple in California, considered Prophet Jones a 'divine predecessor'. The African American Religious Experience in America by Anthony Pinn states: "... Within the United States, particularly in the Detroit area, Jones is still mentioned in spial circles and spial leaders trained by him continue to be somewhat prominent in the Spial Movement."
- Prophet Jones' Detroit followers continue to worship and fellowship at the Church of Universal Triumph, Dominion of God Headquarters, Thankful Center Number One located at 1651 Ferry Park, Detroit, Michigan 48206.
- Famous gospel singer, Professor Alex Bradford (1927–1978) as an adolescent was a follower of Prophet Jones.
- Rev. Ralph J. Boyd of Detroit was mentored by Prophet Jones. During the 1940s Rev. Ralph Boyd migrated to Detroit with Prophet Jones and went on to form his own church called Universal Liberty in Christ Truth Kingdom, Inc.

=== Political power ===
Noted for his ardent U.S. patriotism, Prophet Jones opened his religious radio broadcast with the national anthem and the pledge of allegiance to the flag. A supporter of the Republican Party, Jones created a secular medal award, the Crispus Attucks, and presented it to Michigan's Republican Senator Homer S. Ferguson and Secretary of Defense Charles E. Wilson. In 1951 Prophet Jones delivered the invocation at the opening session of the Michigan State Legislature in Lansing. In 1952 Prophet Jones prophesied that General Dwight D. Eisenhower would win the 1952 presidential election. After Eisenhower's election victory Prophet Jones received an invitation to the inauguration. His attendance there was noted in the press. He stayed at the Rhode Island Plaza Hotel. Many of his supporters now looked at him as a prophet to the White House.

== See also ==
- List of American televangelists

Religious titles
Preceded by none	Dominion Ruler Church of Universal Triumph, Dominion of God; 1944–1971	Succeeded by Rev. Lord James Schaffer
