= James Walton (cricketer) =

English cricketer (1857–1885)

James Walton (25 March 1857-after 1875) was an English cricketer who played for Kent during the 1875 season. He was born in Woolwich Dockyard, then in the county of Kent.

Walton made just one first-class appearance, in a County match against Derbyshire which the team lost by a margin of an innings and 60 runs. Despite being caught for a duck in the first innings, Walton put on a respectable 13 from the tail end in the second innings, the second-highest score of any individual in the Kent second innings.

== Bibliography ==
- Carlaw, Derek (2020). Kent County Cricketers, A to Z: Part One (1806–1914) (PDF). Cardiff: ACS.
