= Jim Walton (footballer) =

Australian rules footballer

Personal information
- Full name: Jim Walton
- Born: 3 June 1934
- Died: 13 March 2013 (aged 78)
- Original team: North Ballarat
- Height: 188 cm (6 ft 2 in)
- Weight: 92 kg (203 lb)

Playing career^{1}
| Years | Club | Games (Goals) |
| 1954–55 | Richmond | 20 (15) |
- ^{1} Playing statistics correct to the end of 1955.

Jim Walton (3 June 1934 – 13 March 2013) was a former Australian rules footballer who played with Richmond in the Victorian Football League (VFL).
