= Triumph the Church and Kingdom of God in Christ =

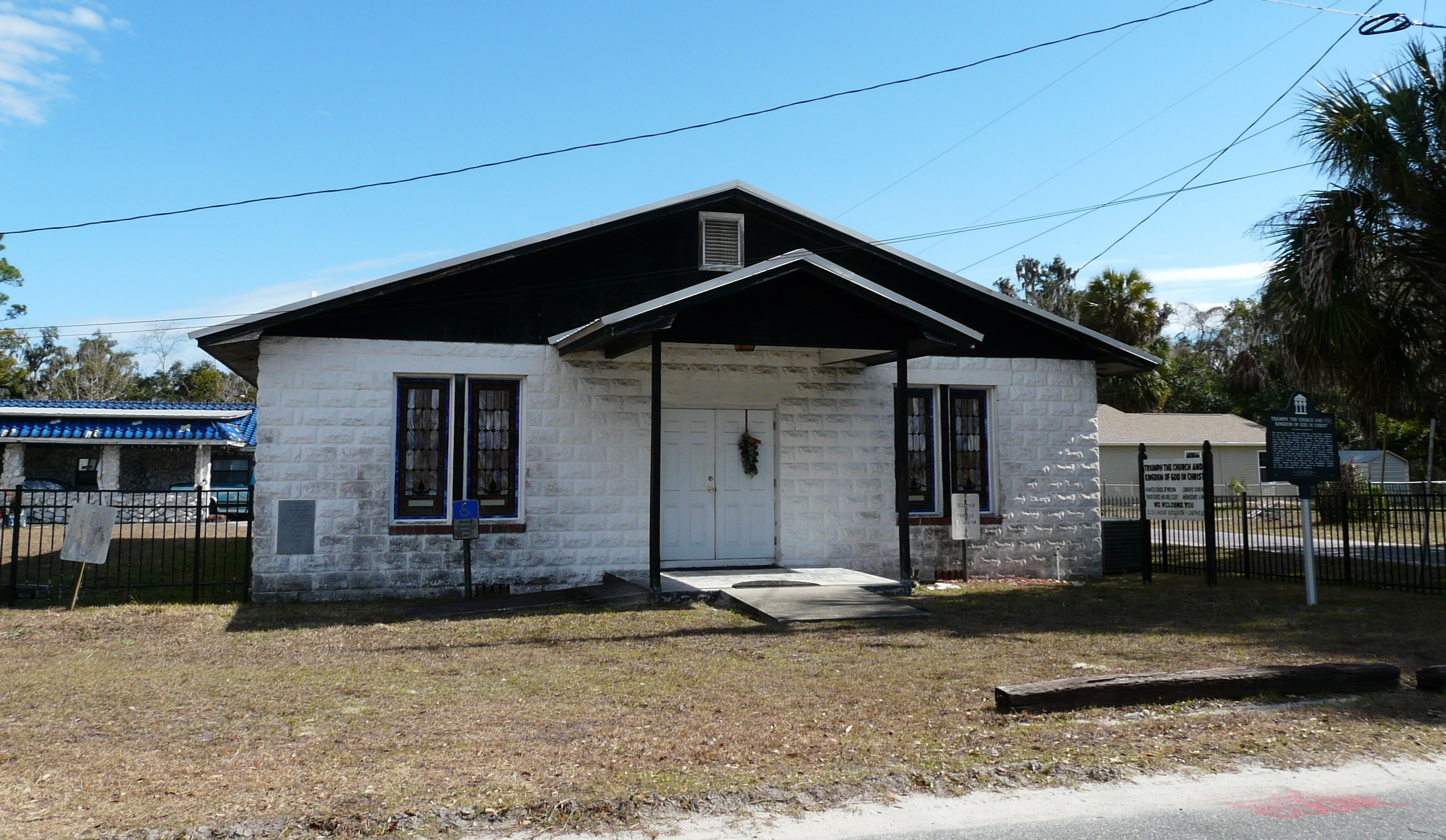
- Church in Cross City, Florida
- Orientation: Holiness Pentecostal
- Chief Apostle: Apostle R. D. Clark, Sr.
- Associations: Church of God in Christ (disassociated in 1912)
- Founder: Apostle Elias Dempsey Smith
- Origin: 1897 (founded) 1918 (incorporated)
- Separated from: African Methodist Episcopal Church
- Separations: Church of Universal Triumph, Dominion of God (separated 1944)
- Official website: www.triumphthechurchnational.org

Triumph the Church and Kingdom of God in Christ is a Holiness Pentecostal denomination founded in 1897 by Apostle "Father" Elias Dempsey Smith. It has largely an African American membership. Around 1936 there were two congregations and thirty-six members, by 1972 there were 425 congregations located in the United States, Africa, and the Philippines. As of 2011, there are congregations in 36 states within the USA and Liberia, West Africa.
