= Church of Universal Triumph, Dominion of God =

Pentecostal Christian denomination founded in 1944

- Classification: Spiritual Church Movement
- Orientation: Holiness Pentecostal
- Polity: Hierarchical, Church conference
- Region: United States, locations in 15 states and other foreign nations
- Founder: James F. Jones
- Origin: September 24, 1944; Detroit, Michigan
- Separated from: Triumph the Church and Kingdom of God in Christ
- Congregations: 35
- Members: < 20000

The Church of Universal Triumph, Dominion of God is a predominantly African American Holiness Pentecostal church. It began as a breakaway congregation of the Detroit branch of the Triumph the Church and Kingdom of God in Christ in the 1940s. It was founded by James F. Jones, often known as Prophet Jones.

== History ==
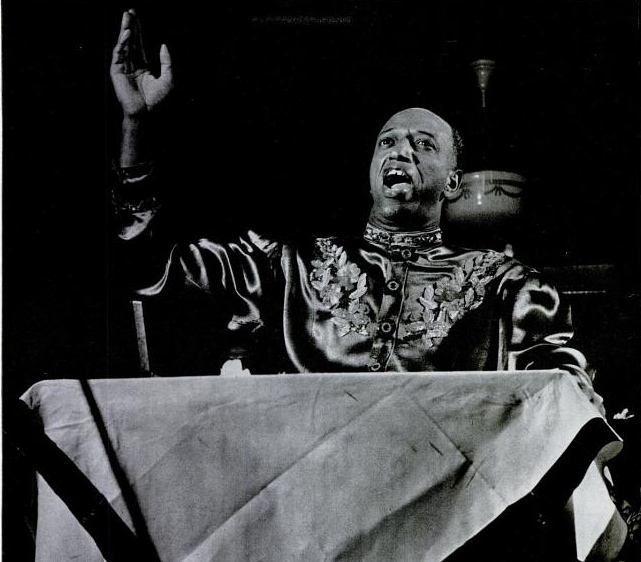
Prophet Jones preaching in November 1944

The Dominion was organized and founded in Detroit, Michigan in 1944 by a former Pastor & missionary for Triumph the Church and Kingdom of God in Christ, James F. Jones. Jones, known as "Prophet Jones", claimed to be a faith healing minister, and ran a fundamentalist Christian, radio and television ministry. Jones further claimed that he was the second coming of Christ with the divine power to heal, forecast, bless and curse.

Jones, as Dominion founder, was the Dominion Ruler from 1944 till his death in 1971. His successor as Dominion Ruler was James Schaffer.
